= Kunugiyama Station =

Railway station in Kamagaya, Chiba Prefecture, Japan

KS80 Kunugiyama Station くぬぎ山駅
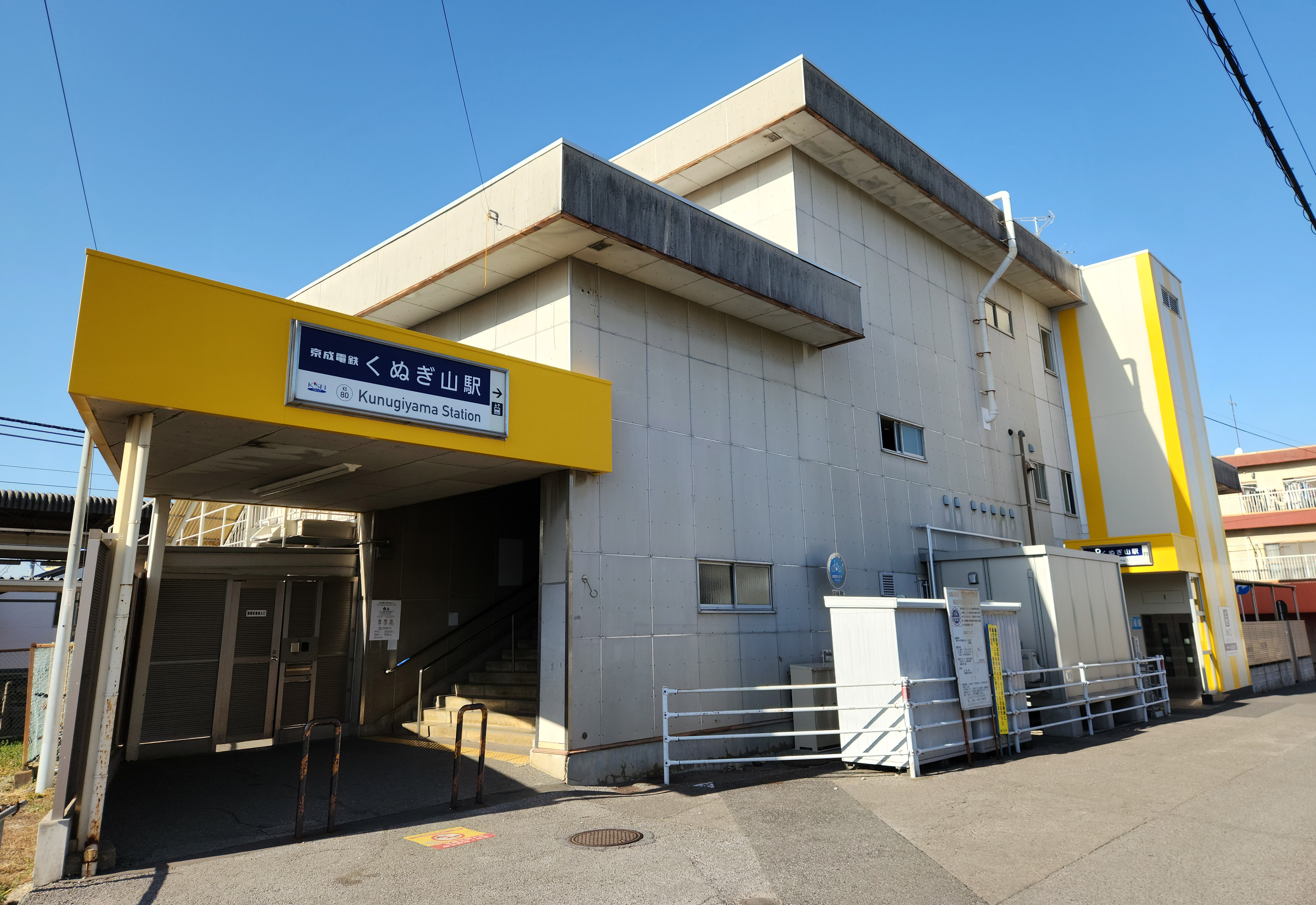
- East Exit Kunugiyama Station in January 2026

General information
- Location: 5-1-6 Kunugiyama, Kamagaya-ken, Chiba-ken 273-0128; Japan
- Coordinates: 35.7826°N 139.9755°E
- Operator: Keisei Electric Railway
- Line: Keisei Matsudo Line
- Distance: 9.6 km (6.0 mi) from Matsudo
- Platforms: 1 island platform
- Tracks: 2

Construction
- Structure type: At grade

Other information
- Station code: ○KS80
- Website: Official website

History
- Opened: 21 April 1955; 71 years ago

Passengers
- FY2017: 3633 daily

Services
Preceding station	Keisei	Following station
Motoyama KS81 towards Matsudo	Matsudo Line	Kita-Hatsutomi KS79 towards Keisei Tsudanuma
Location
- Location within Chiba Prefecture Location within Japan

Kunugiyama Station (くぬぎ山駅, Kunugiyama-eki) is a railway station located in Kamagaya, Chiba Prefecture, Japan, operated by the private railway company Keisei Electric Railway. The former headquarters of Shin-Keisei Electric Railway as well as the rolling stock maintenance facility are also near the station.

== Lines ==
Kunugiyama Station is served by the Keisei Matsudo Line, and is located 9.6 kilometers from the terminus of the line at Matsudo Station.

== Layout ==
The station consists of a single island platform, with an elevated station building. The station is equipped with ticket vending machines and automatic ticket gates.

=== Platforms ===
1	■ Keisei Matsudo Line	For Shin-Kamagaya, Shin-Tsudanuma, Keisei-Tsudanuma
2	■ Keisei Matsudo Line	For Yabashira, Matsudo

== History ==
Kunugiyama Station was opened on 21 April 1955 on the Shin-Keisei Electric Railway.

Effective April 2025, the station came under the aegis of Keisei Electric Railway as the result of the buyout of the Shin-Keisei Railway. The move was completed on 1 April 2025.

== Passenger statistics ==
In fiscal 2017, the station was used by an average of 3633 passengers daily.

== Surrounding area ==
- Former Shin-Keisei Electric Railway head office
- JGSDF Camp Matsudo
- Kamagaya Nishi High School

== See also ==
- List of railway stations in Japan
