= Kamagaya-Daibutsu Station =

Railway station in Kamagaya, Chiba Prefecture, Japan

KS76 Kamagaya-Daibutsu Station 鎌ヶ谷大仏駅
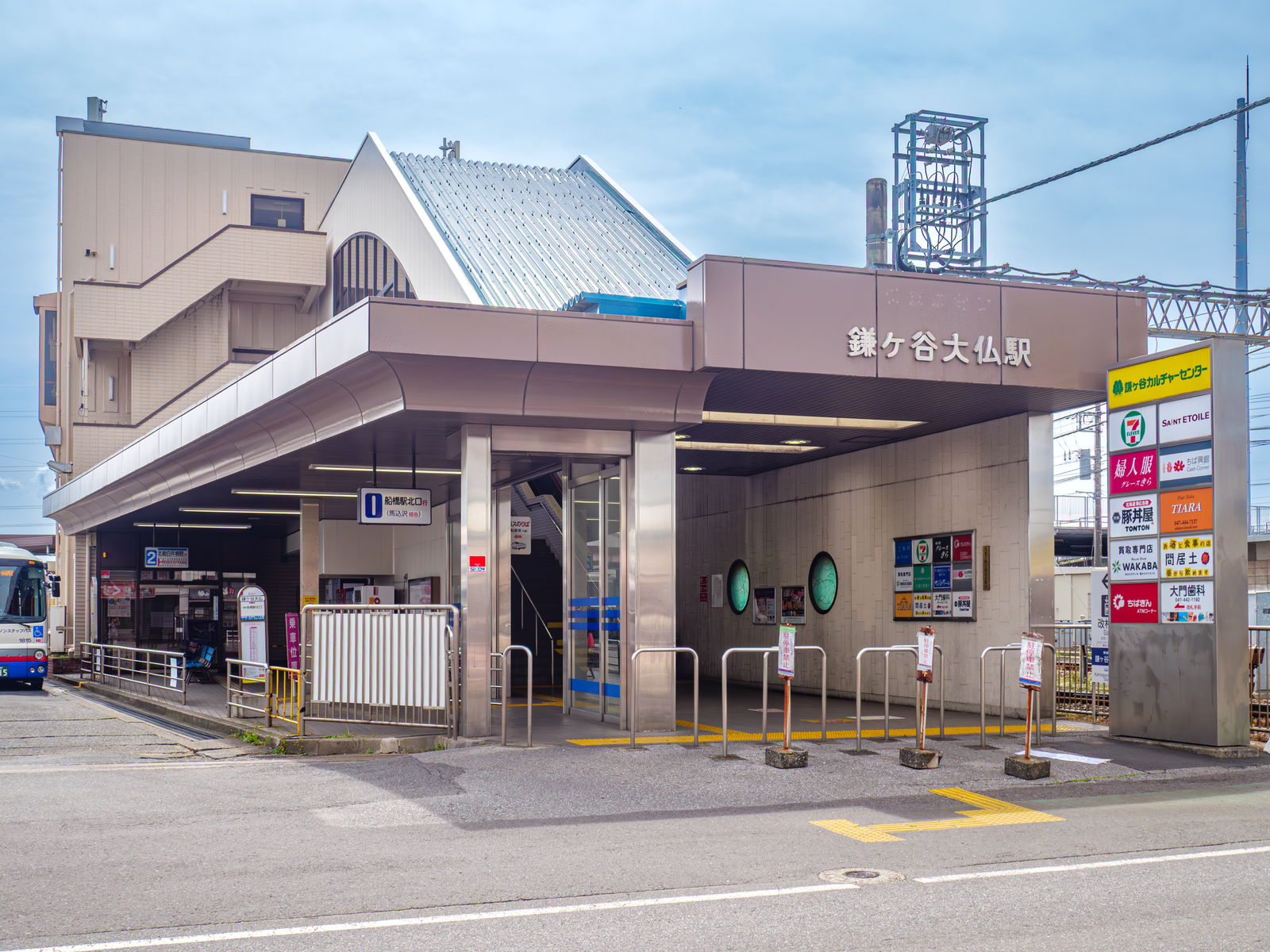
- The north entrance in May 2025

General information
- Location: 1-8-1 Kamagaya, Kamagaya-shi, Chiba-ken 273-0105; Japan
- Coordinates: 35°45′29″N 140°00′50″E
- Operator: Keisei Electric Railway
- Line: Keisei Matsudo Line
- Distance: 15.4 km (9.6 mi) from Matsudo
- Platforms: 1 island platform
- Tracks: 2

Construction
- Structure type: At grade

Other information
- Station code: ○KS76
- Website: Official website

History
- Opened: 21 April 1955; 71 years ago

Passengers
- FY2017: 14,721 daily

Services
Preceding station	Keisei	Following station
Hatsutomi KS77 towards Matsudo	Matsudo Line	Futawamukōdai KS75 towards Keisei Tsudanuma
Location
- Location within Chiba Prefecture Location within Japan

Kamagaya-Daibutsu Station (鎌ヶ谷大仏駅, Kamagaya-Daibutsu-eki) is a railway station in the city of Kamagaya, Chiba, Japan, operated by the private railway operator Keisei Electric Railway.

== Lines ==
Kamagaya-Daibutsu Station is served by the Keisei Matsudo Line, and is 15.4 kilometers from the terminus of the line at Matsudo Station.

== Station layout ==
The station consists of one island platform with an elevated station building.

=== Platforms ===
1	■ Keisei Matsudo Line	for Kita-Narashino, Shin-Tsudanuma, and Keisei-Tsudanuma
2	■ Keisei Matsudo Line	for Shin-Kamagaya, Yabashira, and Matsudo

== History ==
Kamagaya-Daibutsu Station opened on 8 January 1949 on the Shin-Keisei Electric Railway.

Effective April 2025, the station came under the aegis of Keisei Electric Railway as the result of the buyout of the Shin-Keisei Railway. The move was completed on 1 April 2025.

== Passenger statistics ==
In fiscal 2017, the station was used by an average of 14,721 passengers daily.

== Surrounding area ==
This station is the nearest station to the Kamagaya Great Buddha and is directly south of Hatsutomi Station and north of Futawamukōdai Station.

== See also ==
- List of railway stations in Japan
