= Futawamukōdai Station =

Railway station in Funabashi, Chiba Prefecture, Japan

KS75 Futawamukōdai Station 二和向台駅
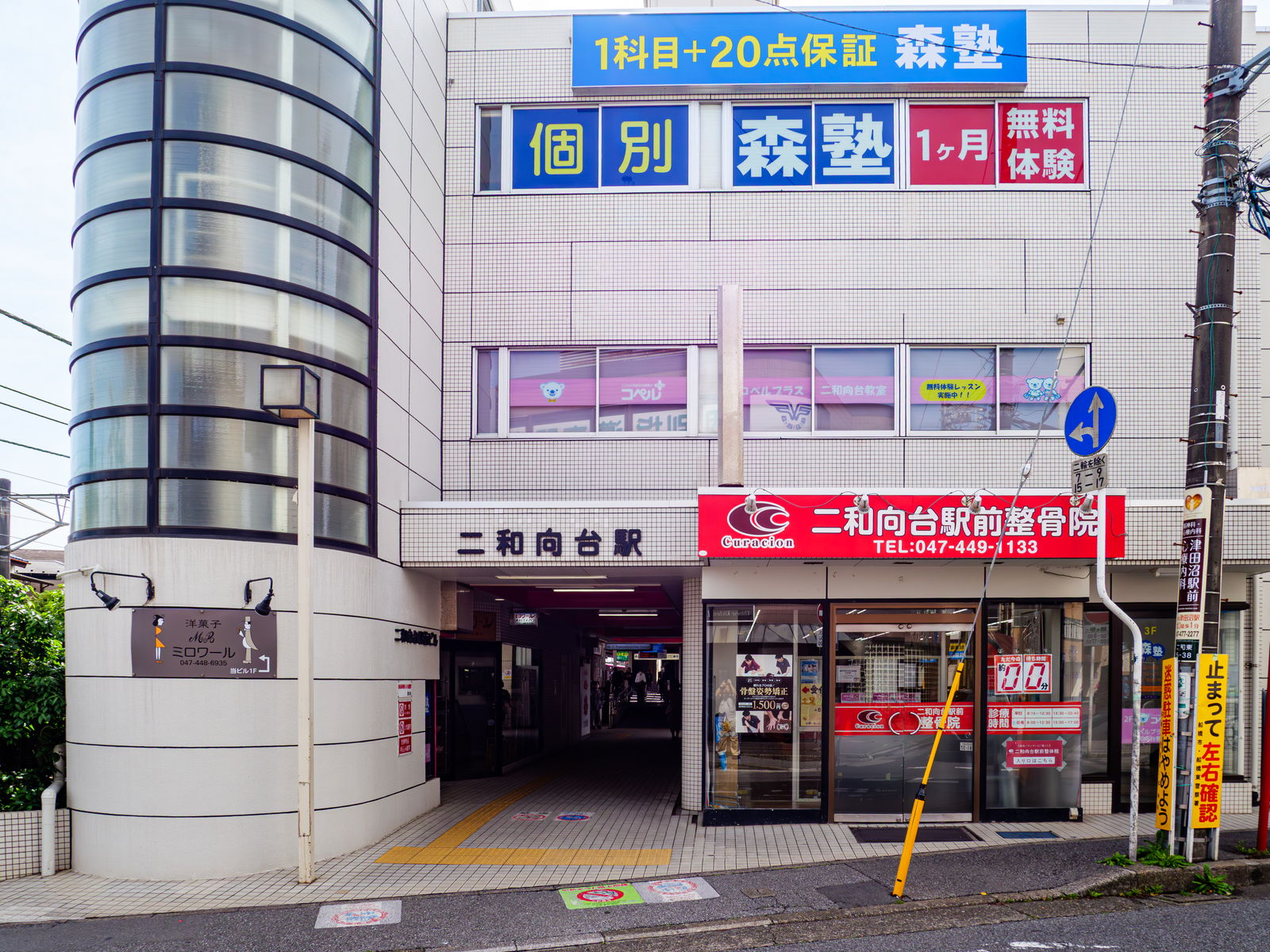
- Futawamukōdai Station building in May 2025

General information
- Location: 5-38-1 Futawa-Higashi, Funabashi-shi, Chiba-ken 274-0805; Japan
- Coordinates: 35.7541°N 140.0235°E
- Operator: Keisei Electric Railway
- Line: Keisei Matsudo Line
- Distance: 16.3 km (10.1 mi) from Matsudo
- Platforms: 2 side platforms
- Tracks: 2

Construction
- Structure type: At grade

Other information
- Station code: ○KS75
- Website: Official website

History
- Opened: 16 March 1949; 77 years ago

Passengers
- 2018: 17,677 daily

Services
Preceding station	Keisei	Following station
Kamagaya-Daibutsu KS76 towards Matsudo	Matsudo Line	Misaki KS74 towards Keisei Tsudanuma
Location
- Location within Chiba Prefecture Location within Japan

Futawamukōdai Station (二和向台駅, Futawamukōdai-eki) is a passenger railway station located in the city of Funabashi, Chiba Prefecture, Japan, operated by the private railway operator Keisei Electric Railway.

== Lines ==
Futawamukōdai Station is served by the Keisei Matsudo Line, and is located 16.3 kilometers from the terminus of the line at Matsudo Station.

== Station layout ==
The station consists of two opposed side platforms.

=== Platforms ===
1	■ Keisei Matsudo Line	For Kita-Narashino, Shin-Tsudanuma, Keisei-Tsudanuma
2	■ Keisei Matsudo Line	For Shin-Kamagaya, Yabashira, Matsudo

== History ==
Futawamukōdai Station was opened on 16 March 1949 on the Shin-Keisei Electric Railway.

Effective April 2025, the station came under the aegis of Keisei Electric Railway as the result of the buyout of the Shin-Keisei Railway. The move was completed on 1 April 2025.

== Passenger statistics ==
In fiscal 2018, the station was used by an average of 17,677 passengers daily.

== Surrounding area ==
- Funabashi City Yakigaya Junior High School
- Funabashi Municipal Sakigaoka Elementary School
- Funabashi Municipal Yakigaya Elementary School

== See also ==
- List of railway stations in Japan
