= Narashino Station =

Railway station in Funabashi, Chiba Prefecture, Japan

KS69 Narashino Station 習志野駅
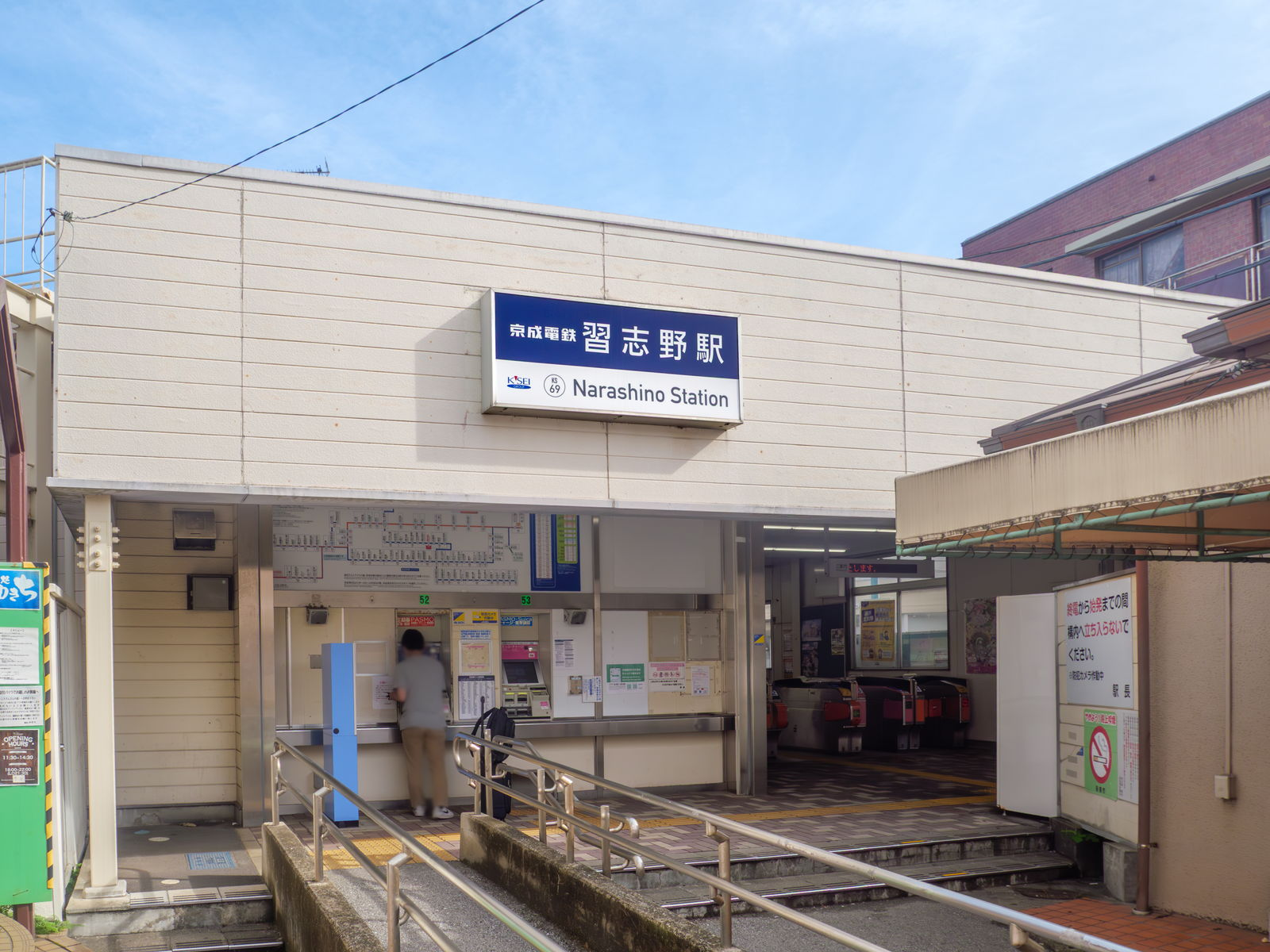
- The station building in May 2025

General information
- Location: 4-1-9 Narashinodai, Funabashi-shi, Chiba-ken 274-0063; Japan
- Coordinates: 35.7153°N 140.0427°E
- Operator: Keisei Electric Railway
- Line: Keisei Matsudo Line
- Distance: 21.7 km (13.5 mi) from Matsudo
- Platforms: 2 side platforms
- Tracks: 2

Construction
- Structure type: At grade

Other information
- Station code: ○KS69
- Website: Official website

History
- Opened: 8 October 1948; 77 years ago

Passengers
- 2018: 13,360 daily

Services
Preceding station	Keisei	Following station
Kita-Narashino KS70 towards Matsudo	Matsudo Line	Yakuendai KS68 towards Keisei Tsudanuma
Location
- Location within Chiba Prefecture Location within Japan

Narashino Station (習志野駅, Narashino-eki) is a passenger railway station located in the city of Funabashi, Chiba Prefecture, Japan, operated by the private railway operator Keisei Electric Railway.

== Lines ==
Narashino Station is served by the Keisei Matsudo Line, and is located 21.7 kilometers from the terminus of the line at Matsudo Station.

== Station layout ==
The station consists of two opposed side platforms, connected to the station building by a footbridge.

=== Platforms ===
1	Keisei Matsudo Line	for Shin-Tsudanuma and Keisei-Tsudanuma; Keisei Chiba Line for Chiba-Chūō
2	Keisei Matsudo Line	for Kita-Narashino, Shin-Kamagaya, Yabashira, and Matsudo

== History ==
Narashino Station was opened on 8 October 1948 on the Shin-Keisei Electric Railway.

Effective April 2025, the station came under the aegis of Keisei Electric Railway as the result of the buyout of the Shin-Keisei Railway. The move was completed on 1 April 2025.

== Passenger statistics ==
In fiscal 2018, the station was used by an average of 13,360 passengers daily.

== Surrounding area ==
- Funabashi City Eastern Health Center
- Funabashi City Higashi Library
- Funabashi City Folk Museum

== See also ==
- List of railway stations in Japan
