= Gokō Station =

Railway station in Matsudo, Chiba Prefecture, Japan

KS82 Gokō Station 五香駅
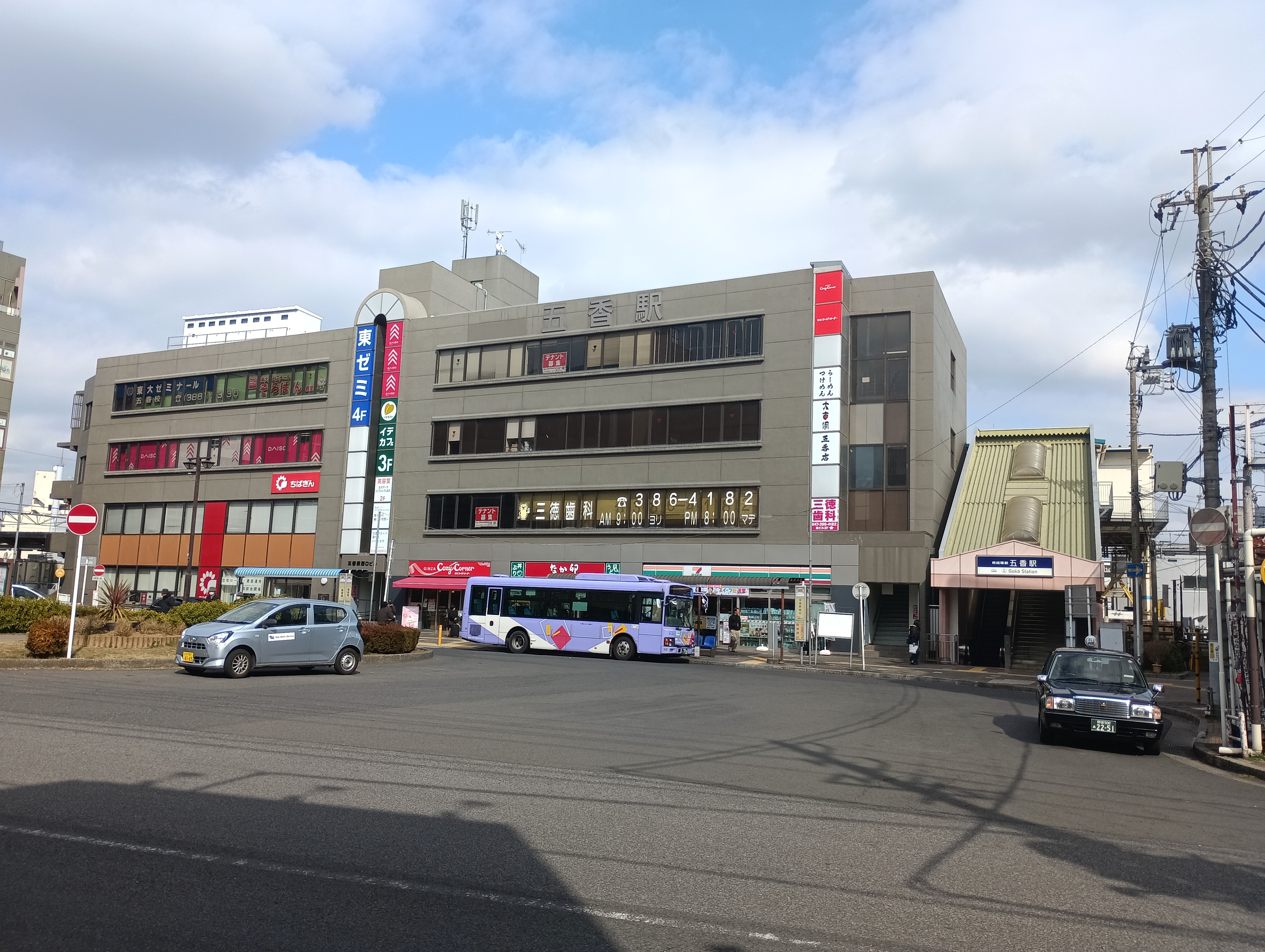
- West entrance in February 2026

General information
- Location: 408-8 Kanegasaku, Matsudo-shi, Chiba-ken 270-2251; Japan
- Coordinates: 35.7972°N 139.9660°E
- Operator: Keisei Electric Railway
- Line: Keisei Matsudo Line
- Distance: 7.4 km (4.6 mi) from Matsudo
- Platforms: 1 island platform
- Tracks: 2

Construction
- Structure type: At grade

Other information
- Station code: ○KS82
- Website: Official website

History
- Opened: 21 April 1955; 71 years ago

Passengers
- 2018: 30,037 daily

Services
Preceding station	Keisei	Following station
Tokiwadaira KS83 towards Matsudo	Matsudo Line	Motoyama KS81 towards Keisei Tsudanuma
Location
- Location within Chiba Prefecture Location within Japan

Gokō Station (五香駅, Gokō-eki) is a passenger railway station located in the city of Matsudo, Chiba Prefecture, Japan, operated by the private railway operator Keisei Electric Railway.

== Lines ==
Gokō Station is served by the Keisei Matsudo Line, and is located 7.4 kilometers from the terminus of the line at Matsudo Station.

== Layout ==
The station consists of a single island platform, with an elevated station building.

=== Platforms ===
1	■ Keisei Matsudo Line	For Shin-Kamagaya , Shin-Tsudanuma, Keisei-Tsudanuma
2	■ Keisei Matsudo Line	For Yabashira, Matsudo

== History ==
Gokō Station was opened on 21 April 1955 on the Shin-Keisei Electric Railway.

Effective April 2025, the station came under the aegis of Keisei Electric Railway as the result of the buyout of the Shin-Keisei Railway. The move was completed on 1 April 2025.

== Passenger statistics ==
In fiscal 2018, the station was used by an average of 30,037 passengers daily.

== Surrounding area ==
- Chiba Prefectural Matsudo International High School
- Matsudo City Daiyon Junior High School
- Kashiwa City Southern Junior High School
- Matsudo City Takagi Daini Elementary School

== See also ==
- List of railway stations in Japan
