= Motoyama Station (Chiba) =

Railway station in Matsudo, Chiba Prefecture, Japan

KS81 Motoyama Station 元山駅
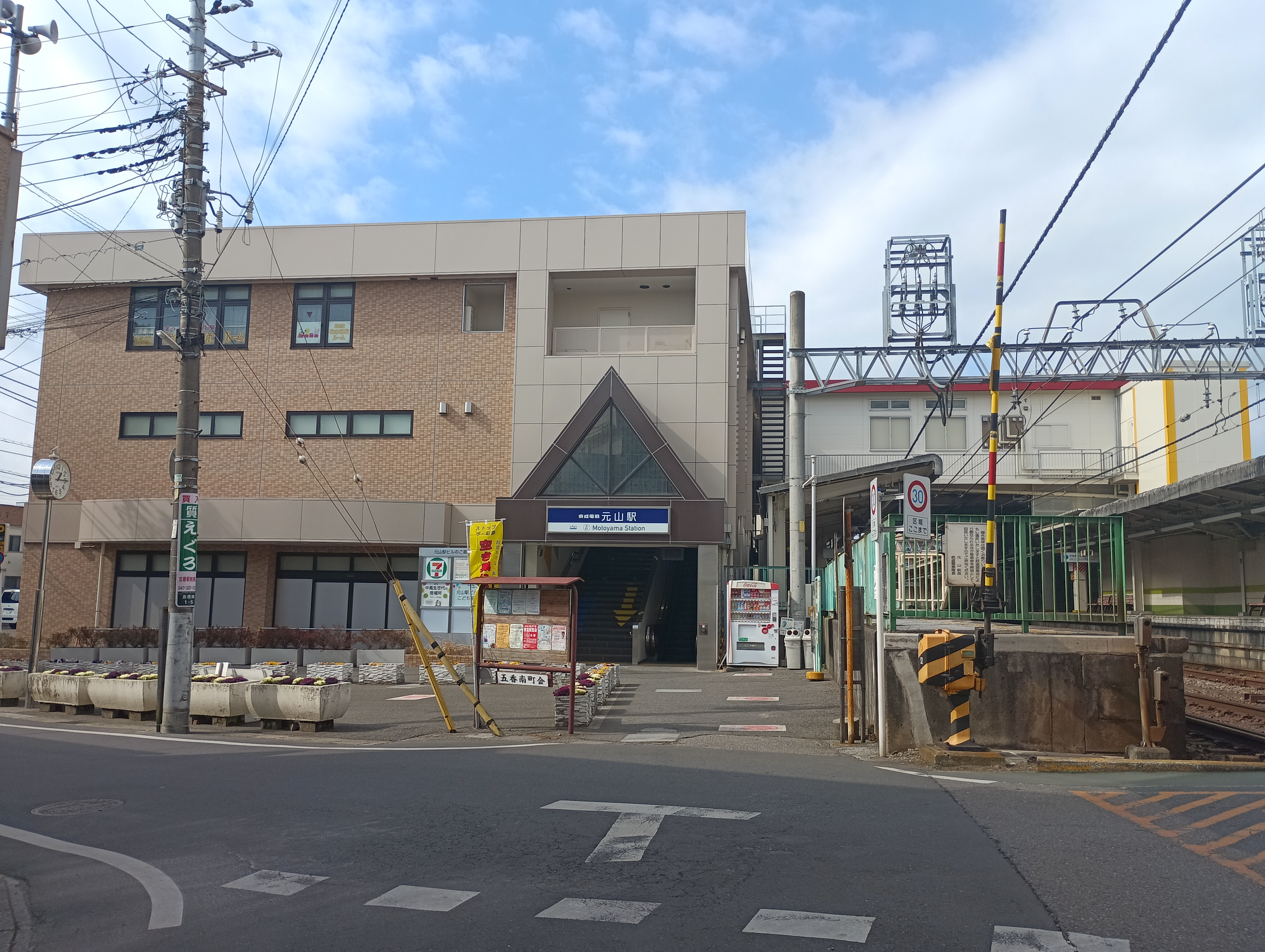
- West exit in February 2026

General information
- Location: 1-5-1 Gokō-Minami, Matsudo-shi, Chiba-ken 270-2212; Japan
- Coordinates: 35°47′25″N 139°58′33″E
- Operator: Keisei Electric Railway
- Line: Keisei Matsudo Line
- Distance: 8.7 km (5.4 mi) from Matsudo
- Platforms: 2 side platforms
- Tracks: 2

Construction
- Structure type: At grade

Other information
- Station code: ○KS81
- Website: Official website

History
- Opened: 21 April 1955; 71 years ago

Passengers
- 2018: 18,364 daily

Services
Preceding station	Keisei	Following station
Gokō KS82 towards Matsudo	Matsudo Line	Kunugiyama KS80 towards Keisei Tsudanuma
Location
- Location within Chiba Prefecture Location within Japan

Motoyama Station (元山駅, Motoyama-eki) is a passenger railway station located in the city of Matsudo, Chiba Prefecture, Japan, operated by the private railway operator Keisei Electric Railway.

== Lines ==
Motoyama Station is served by the Keisei Matsudo Line, and is located 8.7 kilometers from the terminus of the line at Matsudo Station.

== Station layout ==
The station consists of two opposed side platforms, with an elevated station building.

=== Platforms ===
1	■ Keisei Matsudo Line	For Shin-Kamagaya , Shin-Tsudanuma, Keisei-Tsudanuma
2	■ Keisei Matsudo Line	For Yabashira, Matsudo

== History ==
Motoyama Station was opened on 21 April 1955 on the Shin-Keisei Electric Railway.

Effective April 2025, the station came under the aegis of Keisei Electric Railway as the result of the buyout of the Shin-Keisei Railway. The move was completed on 1 April 2025.

== Passenger statistics ==
In fiscal 2018, the station was used by an average of 18,364 passengers daily.

== Surrounding area ==
- GSDF Matsudo Base
- Matsudo City Daiyon Junior High School

== See also ==
- List of railway stations in Japan
