= Hatsutomi Station =

Railway station in Kamagaya, Chiba Prefecture, Japan

KS77 Hatsutomi Station 初富駅
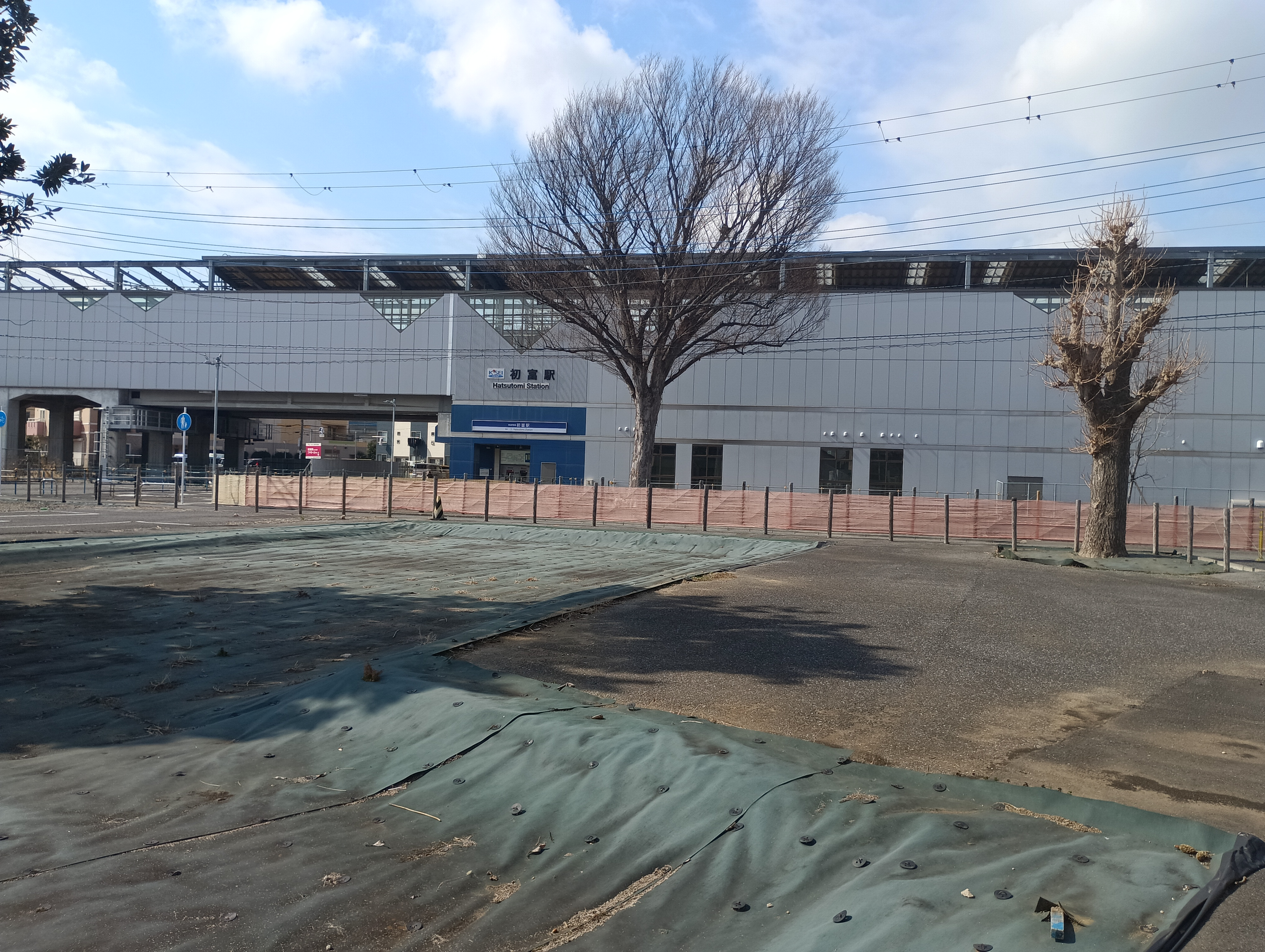
- Hatsutomi Station in February 2026

General information
- Location: 1-2-19 Chuō, Kamagaya-shi, Chiba-ken 273-0124; Japan
- Coordinates: 35.7718°N 140.0007°E
- Operator: Keisei Electric Railway
- Line: Keisei Matsudo Line
- Distance: 13.3 km (8.3 mi) from Matsudo
- Platforms: 1 island platform
- Tracks: 2

Construction
- Structure type: Elevated

Other information
- Station code: ○KS77
- Website: Official website

History
- Opened: 7 October 1949; 76 years ago
- Former names: Kamagaya-Hatsutomi (until 1955)

Passengers
- FY2017: 2690 daily

Services
| Preceding station | Keisei | Following station |
|---|---|---|
| Shin-Kamagaya KS78 towards Matsudo | Matsudo Line | Kamagaya-Daibutsu KS76 towards Keisei Tsudanuma |
Location
- Location within Chiba Prefecture Location within Japan

Hatsutomi Station (初富駅, Hatsutomi-eki) is a railway station located in the city of Kamagaya, Chiba Prefecture, Japan, operated by the Keisei Electric Railway.

== Lines ==
Hatsutomi Station is served by the Keisei Matsudo Line, and is located 13.3 kilometers from the terminus of the line at Matsudo Station.

== Layout ==
The station consists of two opposite side platforms serving two tracks, with the station building underneath.

=== Platforms ===
| 1 | ■ Keisei Matsudo Line | For Kita-Narashino, Shin-Tsudanuma, Keisei-Tsudanuma |
| 2 | ■ Keisei Matsudo Line | For Shin-Kamagaya, Yabashira, Matsudo |

== History ==
Hatsutomi Station was opened on the Shin-Keisei Electric Railway on 7 October 1949 as Kamagaya-Hatsutomi Station (鎌ヶ谷初富駅, Kamagaya-Hatsutomi-eki). It assumed its present name on 1 April 1955.

Effective April 2025, the station came under the aegis of Keisei Electric Railway as the result of the buyout of the Shin-Keisei Railway. The move was completed on 1 April 2025.

== Passenger statistics ==
In fiscal 2017, the station was used by an average of 2690 passengers daily.

== Surrounding area ==
- Kamagaya City Hall
- Kamagaya Middle School
- Kamagaya Elementary School

== See also ==
- List of railway stations in Japan
