= Yakuendai Station =

Railway station in Funabashi, Chiba Prefecture, Japan

KS68 Yakuendai Station 薬円台駅
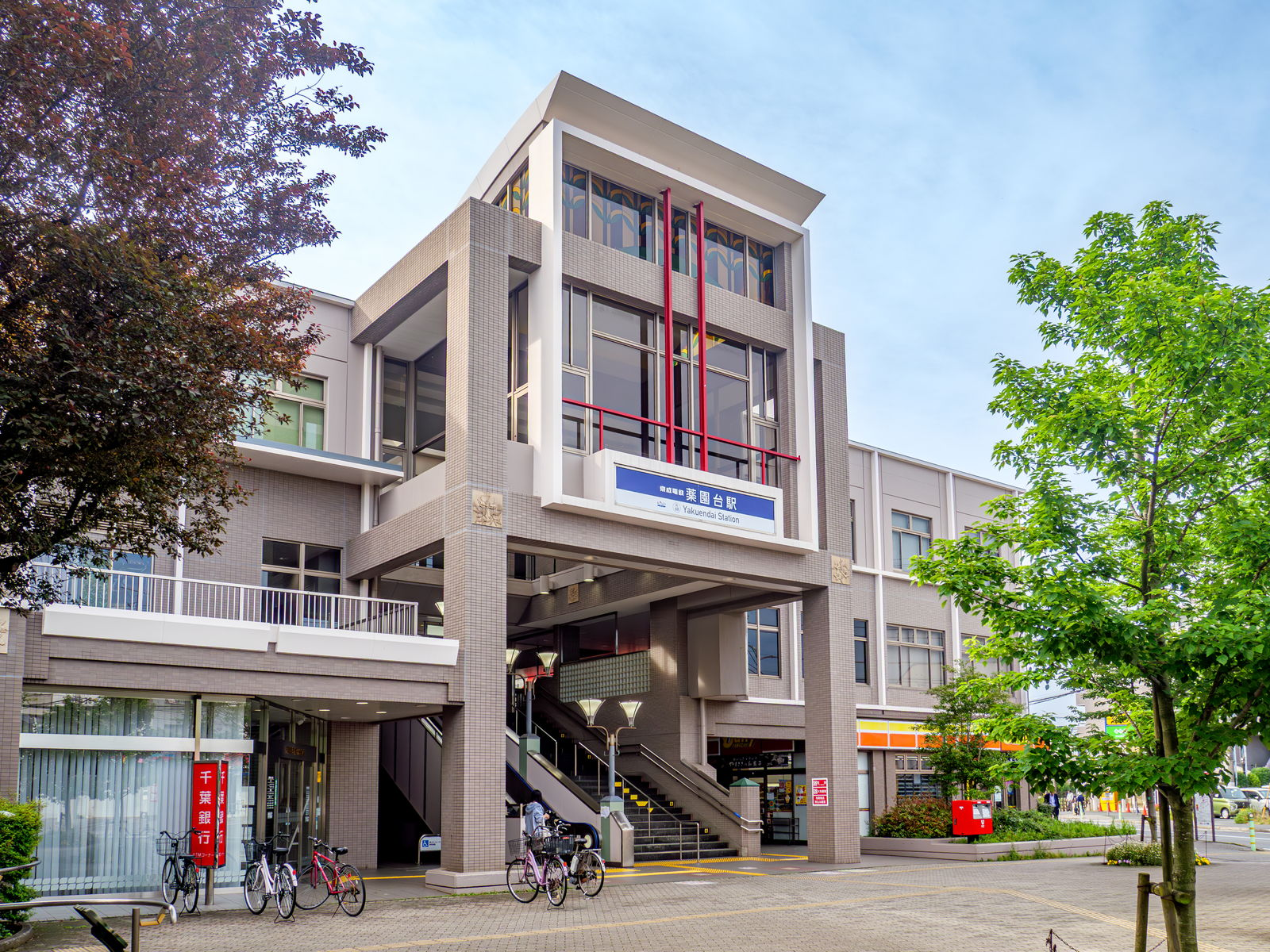
- Yakuendai Station, May 2025

General information
- Location: 6-1-1 Yakuendai, Funabashi-shi, Chiba 274-0077; Japan
- Coordinates: 35.7103°N 140.0374°E
- Operator: Keisei Electric Railway
- Line: Keisei Matsudo Line
- Distance: 22.5 km (14.0 mi) from Matsudo
- Platforms: 1 island platform
- Tracks: 2

Construction
- Structure type: At grade

Other information
- Station code: ○KS68
- Website: Official website

History
- Opened: 27 December 1947; 78 years ago

Passengers
- FY 2018: 15,229 daily

Services
Preceding station	Keisei	Following station
Narashino KS69 towards Matsudo	Matsudo Line	Maebara KS67 towards Keisei Tsudanuma
Location
- Location within Chiba Prefecture Location within Japan

Yakuendai Station (薬園台駅, Yakuendai-eki) is a passenger railway station located in the city of Funabashi, Chiba Prefecture, Japan, operated by the private railway operator Keisei Electric Railway.

== Lines ==
Yakuendai Station is served by the Keisei Matsudo Line, and is located 22.5 kilometers from the terminus of the line at Matsudo Station.

== Station layout ==
The station consists of a single island platform, with an elevated station building.

=== Platforms ===
1	Keisei Matsudo Line	for Shin-Tsudanuma and Keisei-Tsudanuma; Keisei Chiba Line for Chiba-Chūō
2	Keisei Matsudo Line	for Kita-Narashino, Shin-Kamagaya, Yabashira, and Matsudo

== History ==
Yakuendai Station was opened on 27 December 1947 on the Shin-Keisei Electric Railway. The station relocated to its present location and a new station building was completed by 29 July 2000.

Effective April 2025, the station came under the aegis of Keisei Electric Railway as the result of the buyout of the Shin-Keisei Railway. The move was completed on 1 April 2025.

== Passenger statistics ==
In fiscal 2018, the station was used by an average of 15,229 passengers daily.

== Surrounding area ==
- Funabashi Municipal Nanabayashi Junior High School
- Funabashi City Hasama Elementary School
- Funabashi Municipal Nanabayashi Elementary School

== See also ==
- List of railway stations in Japan
