= Kita-Hatsutomi Station =

Railway station in Kamagaya, Chiba Prefecture, Japan

KS79 Kita-Hatsutomi Station 北初富駅
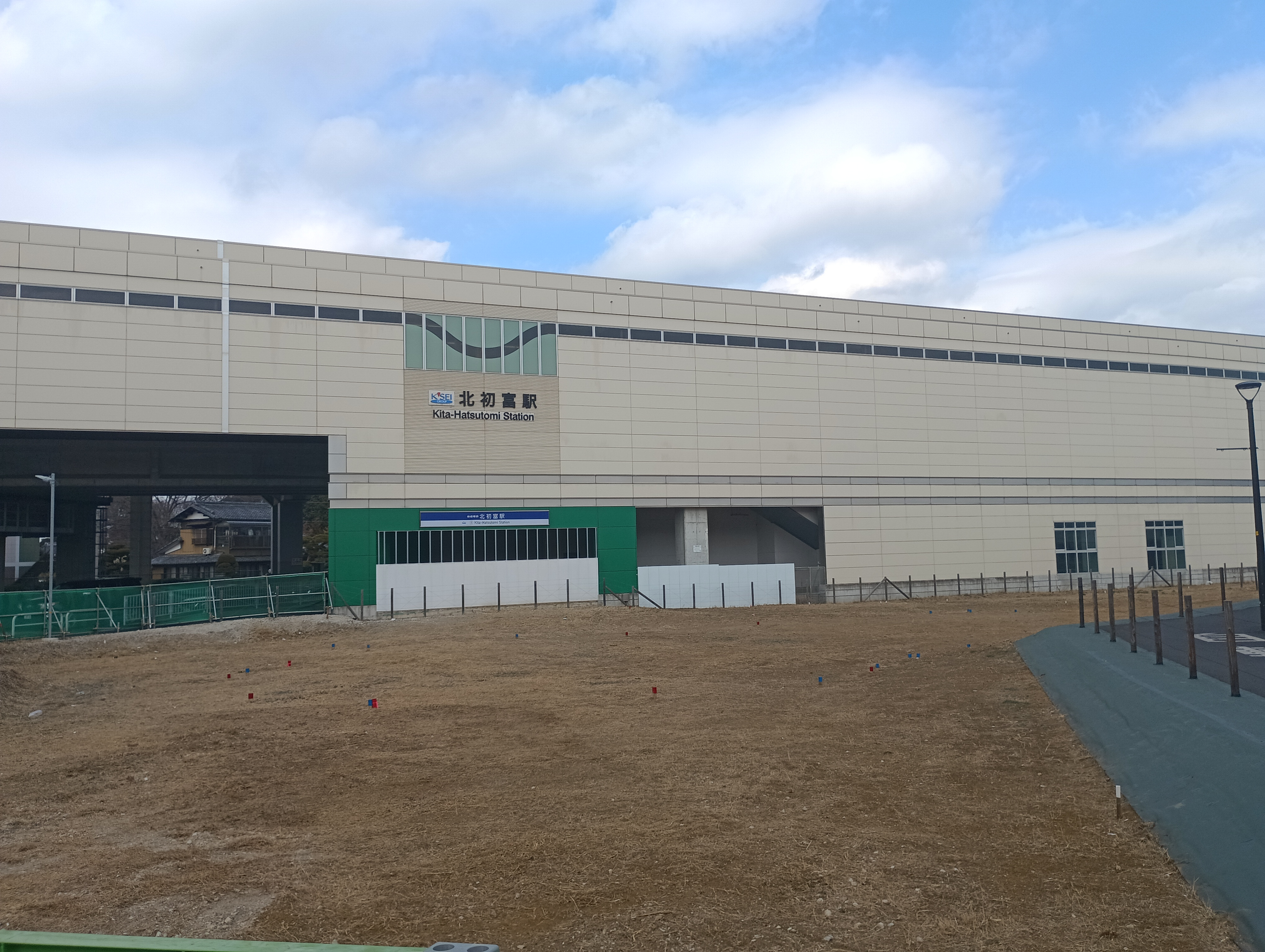
- The entrance of Kita-Hatsutomi Station, February 2026

General information
- Location: 1-18-25 Kita-Nakazawa, Kamagaya-shi, Chiba-ken 273-0126; Japan
- Coordinates: 35°46′37″N 139°59′25″E
- Operator: Keisei Electric Railway
- Line: Keisei Matsudo Line
- Distance: 11.3 km (7.0 mi) from Matsudo
- Platforms: 2 side platforms
- Tracks: 2

Construction
- Structure type: Elevated

Other information
- Station code: ○KS79
- Website: Official website

History
- Opened: 21 April 1955; 71 years ago

Passengers
- FY2017: 2,950 daily

Services
Preceding station	Keisei	Following station
Kunugiyama KS80 towards Matsudo	Matsudo Line	Shin-Kamagaya KS78 towards Keisei Tsudanuma
Location
- Location within Chiba Prefecture Location within Japan

Kita-Hatsutomi Station (北初富駅, Kita-Hatsutomi-eki) is a railway station located in the city of Kamagaya, Chiba Prefecture, Japan, operated by the private railway company Keisei Electric Railway.

== Lines ==
Kita-Hatsutomi Station is served by the Keisei Matsudo Line, and is located 11.3 kilometers from the terminus of the line at Matsudo Station.

== Station layout ==
The station has two opposed side platforms, with the station building underneath.

=== Platforms ===
1	■ Keisei Matsudo Line	For Shin-Kamagaya, Shin-Tsudanuma, Keisei-Tsudanuma
2	■ Keisei Matsudo Line	For Yabashira, Matsudo

== History ==
Kita-Hatsutomi Station on the Shin-Keisei Electric Railway was opened on 21 April 1955. On 9 March 1979, the Hokuso Line connected this station with Komuro Station. However, on July 8, 1982 the Hokuso Line discontinued operations from Shin-Kamagaya Station to Kita-Hatsuomi Station, and the junction station between the Hokuso Line and the Shin-Keisei Line was shifted to Shin-Kamagaya Station.

=== Recent plans ===
Effective April 2025, the station came under the aegis of Keisei Electric Railway as the result of the buyout of the Shin-Keisei Railway. The move was completed on 1 April 2025.

== Passenger statistics ==
In fiscal 2017, the station was used by an average of 2590 passengers daily.

== Surrounding area ==
- National Route 464
- Kamagaya No.3 Middle School

== See also ==
- List of railway stations in Japan
