= Kamagaya Great Buddha =

Japanese Buddha statue

- 鎌ヶ谷大仏 (Japanese)
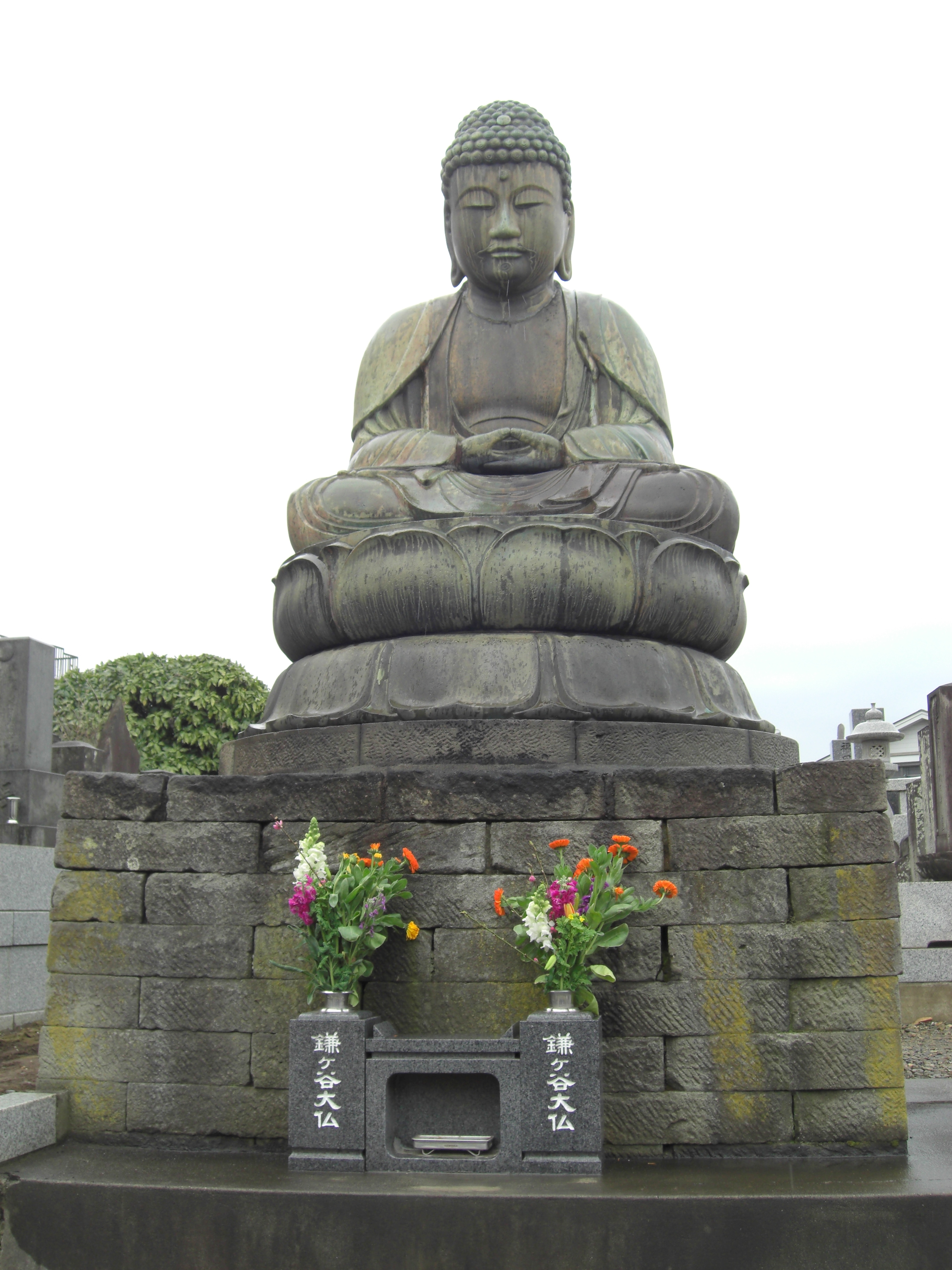
- Kamagaya Daibutsu

- Artist: Tagawa Shuzen
- Year: 1776
- Type: Statue
- Medium: Bronze
- Subject: Gautama Buddha
- Dimensions: 2.3 m (7.5 ft) high
- Location: Kamagaya, Chiba Prefecture, Japan; 35.758985°N 140.0132713°E

The Kamagaya Great Buddha (鎌ヶ谷大仏, Kamagaya Daibutsu) is the smallest Daibutsu (Buddhist statue) in Japan. It is located in the city of Kamagaya, Chiba Prefecture, to the north of Tokyo.

== History ==
The Kamagaya Daibutsu was commissioned by a wealthy local merchant, Okuniya Fukuda Bunemon, to pray for the souls of his ancestors. It was cast by Tagawa Shuzen, a noted foundry smith of Kanda in Edo and It was completed in November 1776. It became the symbol of Kamagaya, and was protected by local residents against the movement to eradicate Buddhism of the early Meiji period, and against efforts by the government to collect all available bronze for the war effort in World War II. It was designated as a cultural property of Kamagaya City in 1972. The statue remains property of the Fukuda family.

== Measurements ==
- Total Height: 2.3 metres (7.5 ft)
  - Height of Statue: 1.8 metres (5.9 ft)
  - Height of Base: 0.5 metres (1.6 ft)

== Access ==
From Funabashi Station, board a bus towards Kamagaya-Daibutsu via Futawamichi (or board one towards Kamagaya-Daibutsu via Misaki Station). Alight at "Kamagaya-Daibutsu", the final stop.

The nearest train station is Kamagaya-Daibutsu Station (Keisei Matsudo Line). It takes approximately 24 minutes from Matsudo Station, 17 minutes from Shin-Tsudanuma Station and 21 minutes from Keisei-Tsudanuma Station.

It is approximately one minute's walk from the Kamagaya-Daibutsu Station.
