= Maebara Station =

Railway station in Funabashi, Chiba Prefecture, Japan

KS67 Maebara Station 前原駅
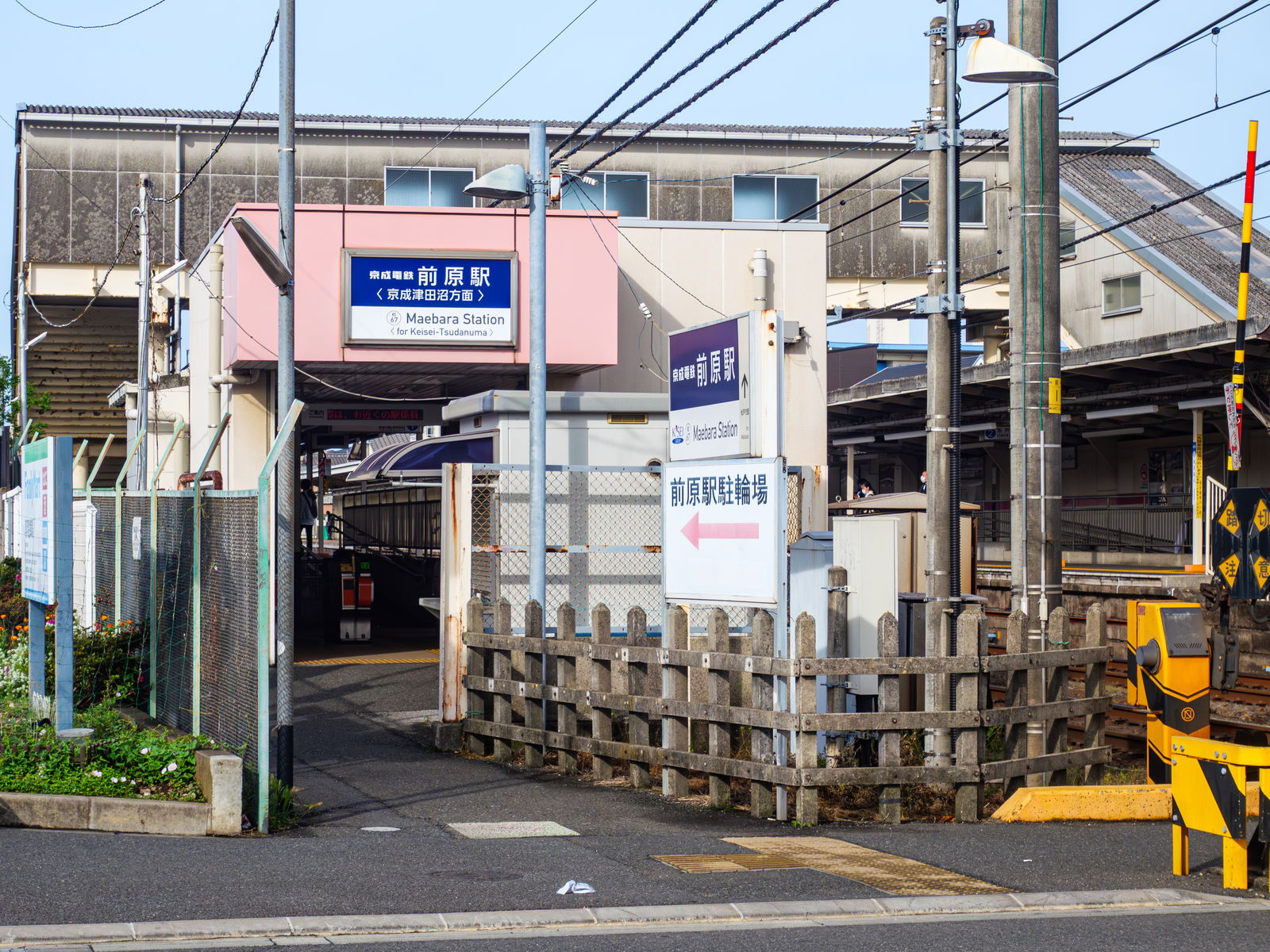
- Maebara Station in May 2025

General information
- Location: 7-17-21 Maebaranishi, Funabashi-shi, Chiba-ken 274-0825; Japan
- Coordinates: 35.7006°N 140.0275°E
- Operator: Keisei Electric Railway
- Line: Keisei Matsudo Line
- Distance: 23.9 km (14.9 mi) from Matsudo
- Platforms: 2 side platforms
- Tracks: 2

Construction
- Structure type: At grade

Other information
- Station code: ○KS67
- Website: Official website

History
- Opened: 13 December 1948; 77 years ago

Passengers
- 2018: 9,362 daily

Services
Preceding station	Keisei	Following station
Yakuendai KS68 towards Matsudo	Matsudo Line	Shin-Tsudanuma KS66 towards Keisei Tsudanuma
Location
- Location within Chiba Prefecture Location within Japan

Maebara Station (前原駅, Maebara-eki) is a passenger railway station located in the city of Funabashi, Chiba Prefecture, Japan, operated by the private railway operator Keisei Electric Railway.

== Lines ==
Maebara Station is served by the Keisei Matsudo Line, and is located 23.9 kilometers from the terminus of the line at Matsudo Station.

== Station layout ==
Maebara Station has two opposed side platforms connected by a footbridge. The station is somewhat unusual in that each platform has a separate exit.

=== Platforms ===
1	Keisei Matsudo Line	for Shin-Tsudanuma and Keisei-Tsudanuma; Keisei Chiba Line for Chiba-Chūō
2	Keisei Matsudo Line	for Kita-Narashino, Shin-Kamagaya, Yabashira, and Matsudo

== History ==
Maebara Station was opened on 13 December 1948. From 1961 to 1968, a spur line extended from Maebara Station to Shin-Tsudanuma Station via Fujisakidai Station (藤崎台駅, Fujisakidai-eki). The line was discontinued in 1968.

On 1 April 2025, operations of this station came under the aegis of Keisei Electric Railway as the result of the buyout of the Shin-Keisei Electric Railway.

== Passenger statistics ==
In fiscal 2018, the station was used by an average of 9,362 passengers daily.

== Surrounding area ==
- Funabashi City Maehara Junior High School
- Funabashi City Maehara Elementary School
- Funabashi City Nakanoki Elementary School

== See also ==
- List of railway stations in Japan
