= Misaki Station (Chiba) =

Railway station in Funabashi, Chiba Prefecture, Japan

KS74 Misaki Station 三咲駅
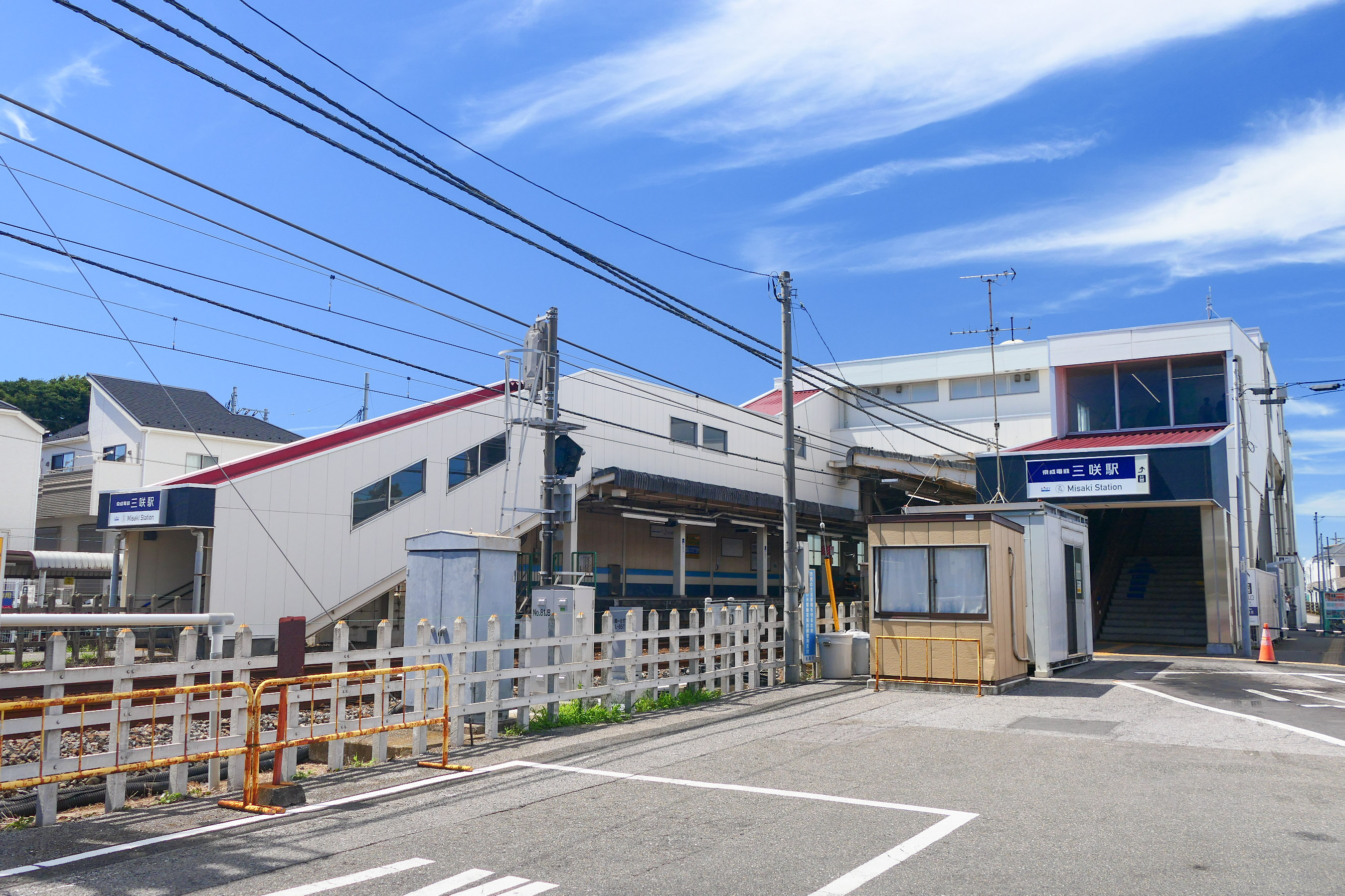
- Misaki Station in July 2025

General information
- Location: 2-2-1 Misaki, Funabashi-shi, Chiba-ken 274-0812; Japan
- Coordinates: 35.7490°N 140.0287°E
- Operator: Keisei Electric Railway
- Line: Keisei Matsudo Line
- Distance: 17.1 km (10.6 mi) from Matsudo
- Platforms: 2 side platforms
- Tracks: 2

Construction
- Structure type: At grade

Other information
- Station code: ○KS74
- Website: Official website

History
- Opened: 8 January 1949; 77 years ago

Passengers
- 2018: 14,071 daily

Services
Preceding station	Keisei	Following station
Futawamukōdai KS75 towards Matsudo	Matsudo Line	Takifudō KS73 towards Keisei Tsudanuma
Location
- Location within Chiba Prefecture Location within Japan

Misaki Station (三咲駅, Misaki-eki) is a passenger railway station located in the city of Funabashi, Chiba Prefecture, Japan, operated by the private railway operator Keisei Electric Railway.

== Lines ==
Misaki Station is served by the Keisei Matsudo Line, and is located 17.1 kilometres (10.6 mi) from the terminus of the line at Matsudo Station.

== Station layout ==
The station consists of two opposed side platforms, with an elevated station building.

=== Platforms ===
1	■ Keisei Matsudo Line	For Kita-Narashino, Shin-Tsudanuma, Keisei-Tsudanuma
2	■ Keisei Matsudo Line	For Shin-Kamagaya, Yabashira, Matsudo

== History ==
Misaki Station was opened on 8 January 1949 on the Shin-Keisei Electric Railway. The current elevated station building was completed in 1987.

Effective April 2025, the station came under the aegis of Keisei Electric Railway as the result of the buyout of the Shin-Keisei Railway. The move was completed on 1 April 2025.

== Passenger statistics ==
In fiscal 2018, the station was used by an average of 14,071 passengers daily.

== Surrounding area ==
- Funabashi City Misaki Public Hall
- Funabashi City Northern Welfare Hall
- Funabashi City North Health Center

== See also ==
- List of railway stations in Japan
