= Misaki Station =

Misaki Station is the name of two train stations in Japan:

- Misaki Station (Chiba) (三咲駅)
- Misaki Station (Hokkaido) (御崎駅)
