= Shin-Keisei 8000 series =

Japanese train type

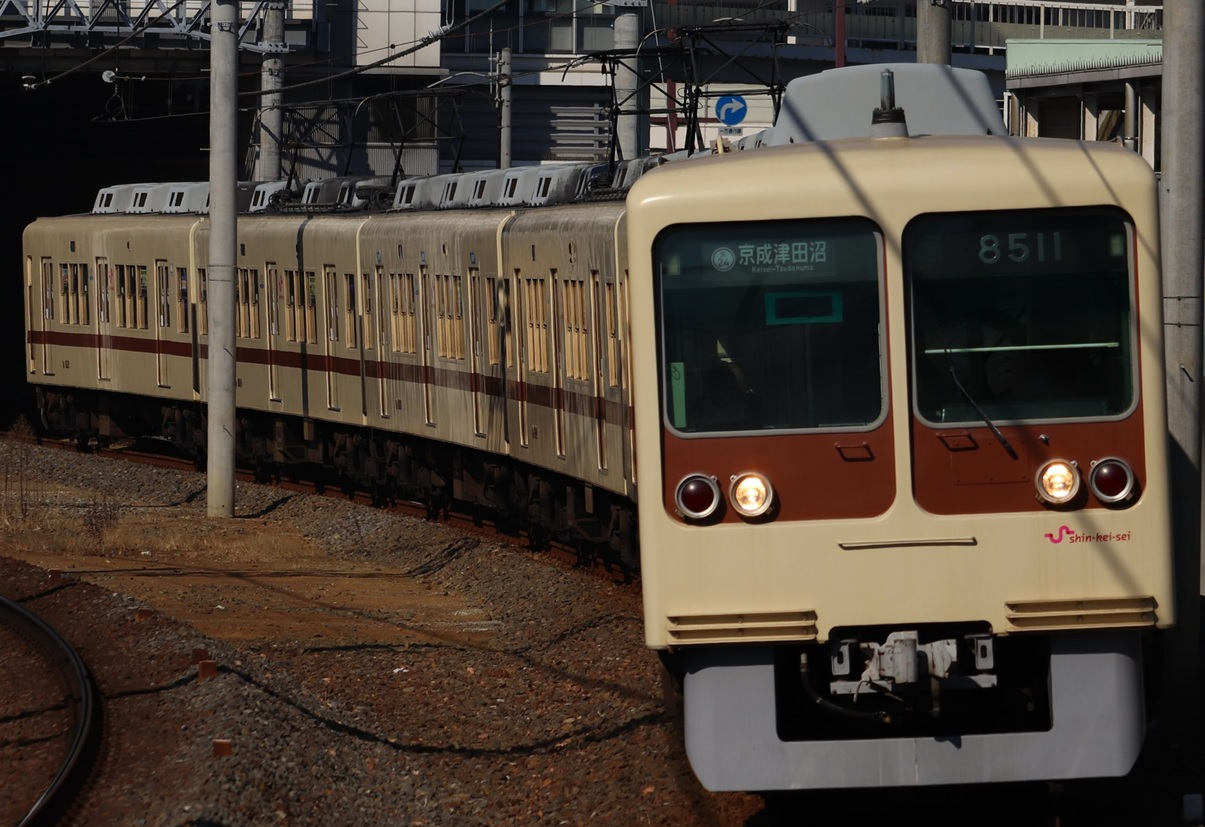
- 8000 series set 8512 in January 2021
- In service: 1978 – 2021
- Manufacturer: Nippon Sharyo
- Entered service: 1 December 1978
- Scrapped: 2011 – Present
- Number built: 54 vehicles (9 sets)
- Number in service: None
- Number scrapped: 48 vehicles (8 sets)
- Formation: 6 cars per set
- Fleet numbers: 8502–8518
- Operator: Shin-Keisei Electric Railway
- Depot: Kunugiyama
- Lines served: Shin-Keisei Line, Keisei Chiba Line

Specifications
- Car body construction: Steel
- Car length: 18 m (59 ft 1 in)
- Doors: 3 pairs per side
- Traction system: Resistor control, Chopper control, Variable frequency (2-level IGBT)
- Electric system: 1,500 V DC
- Current collection: Overhead wire
- Track gauge: 1,435 mm (4 ft 8 1/2 in)

The Shin-Keisei 8000 series (新京成8000形) is an electric multiple unit (EMU) train type operated by the private railway operator Shin-Keisei Electric Railway on the Shin-Keisei Line in Chiba Prefecture, Japan from 1978 to 2021.

== Formations ==
As of 1 April 2016, the fleet consists of three six-car sets based at Kunugiyama Depot with four motored (M) intermediate cars and two driving trailer (Tc) cars, formed as shown below, with the odd-numbered Tc car at the Tsudanuma end.

Designation	Tc	M1	M2	M1	M2	Tc
Numbering	85xx	80xx				85xx

- The M2 cars are each fitted with two lozenge-type pantographs.
- The middle M1 car is designated as having mild air-conditioning.

== History ==
The first set was introduced on 1 December 1978. Eight more sets were introduced between 1979 and 1985. With the introduction of newer trains, scrapping and retirements began in 2011. The last set, 8512, was retired on 1 November 2021, following an announcement on the company's official Twitter account.

=== Livery variations ===
Trainsets introduced from 1979 onward carried what subsequently became known as the Shin-Keisei "standard livery", consisting of beige with a brown stripe below the windows. This livery was also used on the 8800 series trains introduced in 1986. From December 2006, the trains were repainted into a modified version of this livery with the brown stripes replaced by maroon stripes, coinciding with the start of through-running to and from the Keisei Chiba Line.

The first set to receive Shin-Keisei's new pink and white corporate livery introduced in 2014 was 8518 in April 2017.

In 2017, one of the last three 8000 series sets remaining in service, 8512, was specially repainted into the standard livery introduced in 1979.

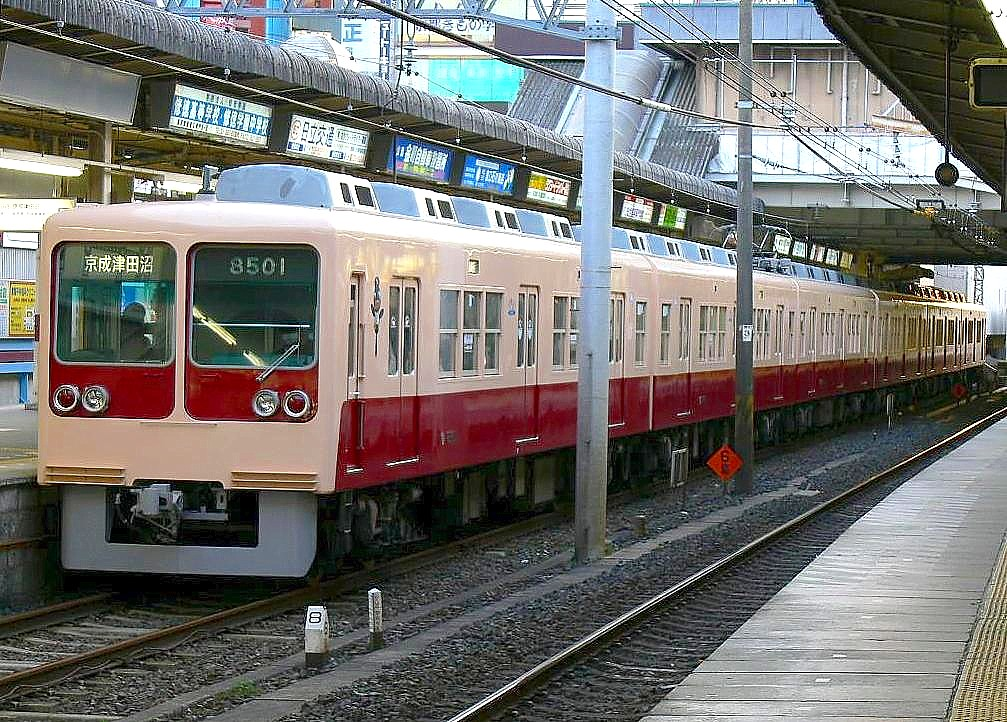
Set 8502 in original livery in December 2005

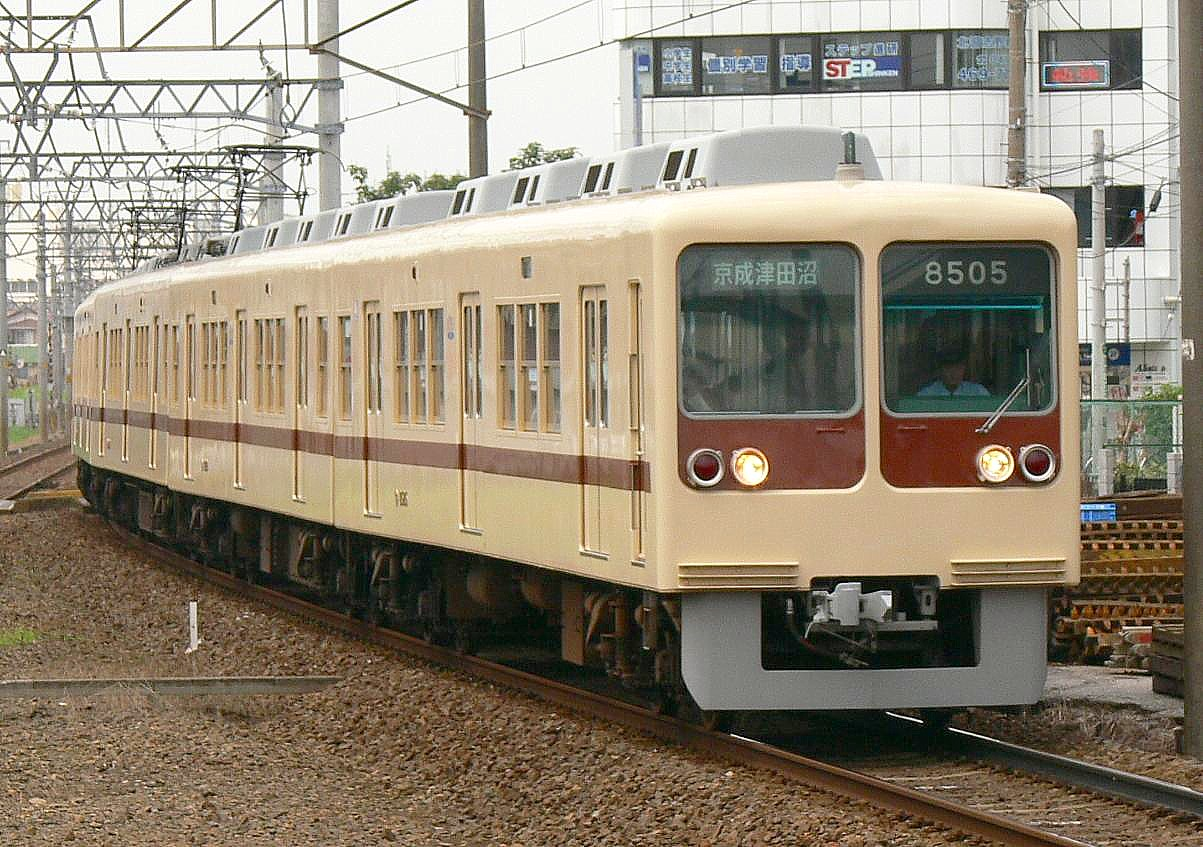
Set 8506 in the second livery variation in August 2006

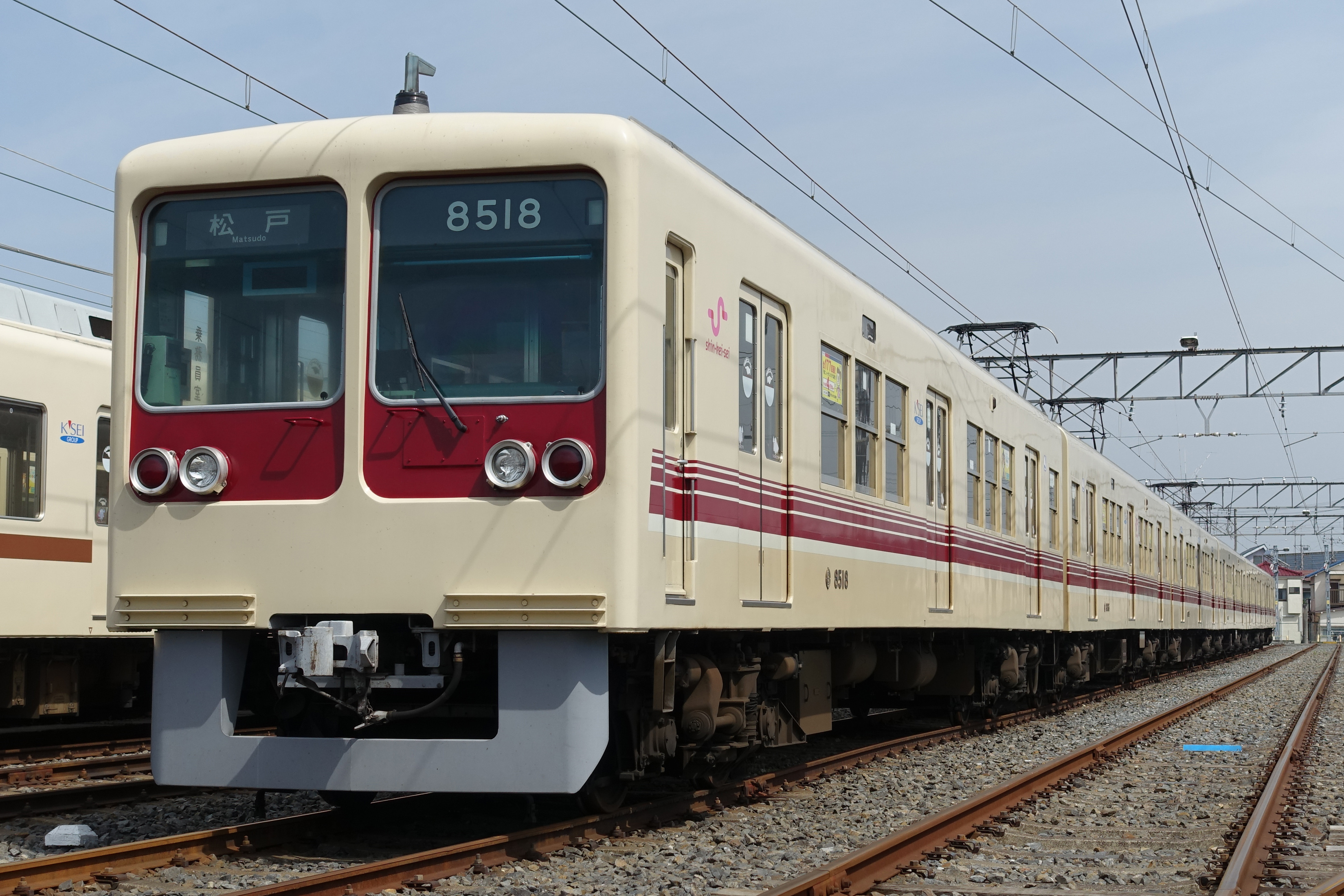
Set 8518 in the third livery variation in April 2015

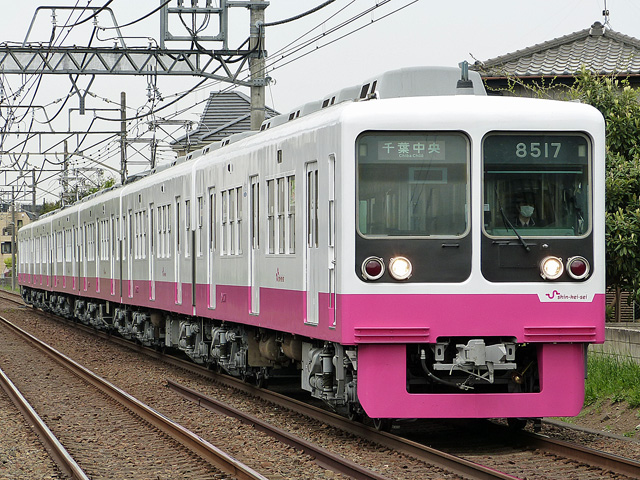
Set 8518 in the fourth livery variation in April 2017
