= Kamagaya =

Kamagaya 鎌ヶ谷市
- City
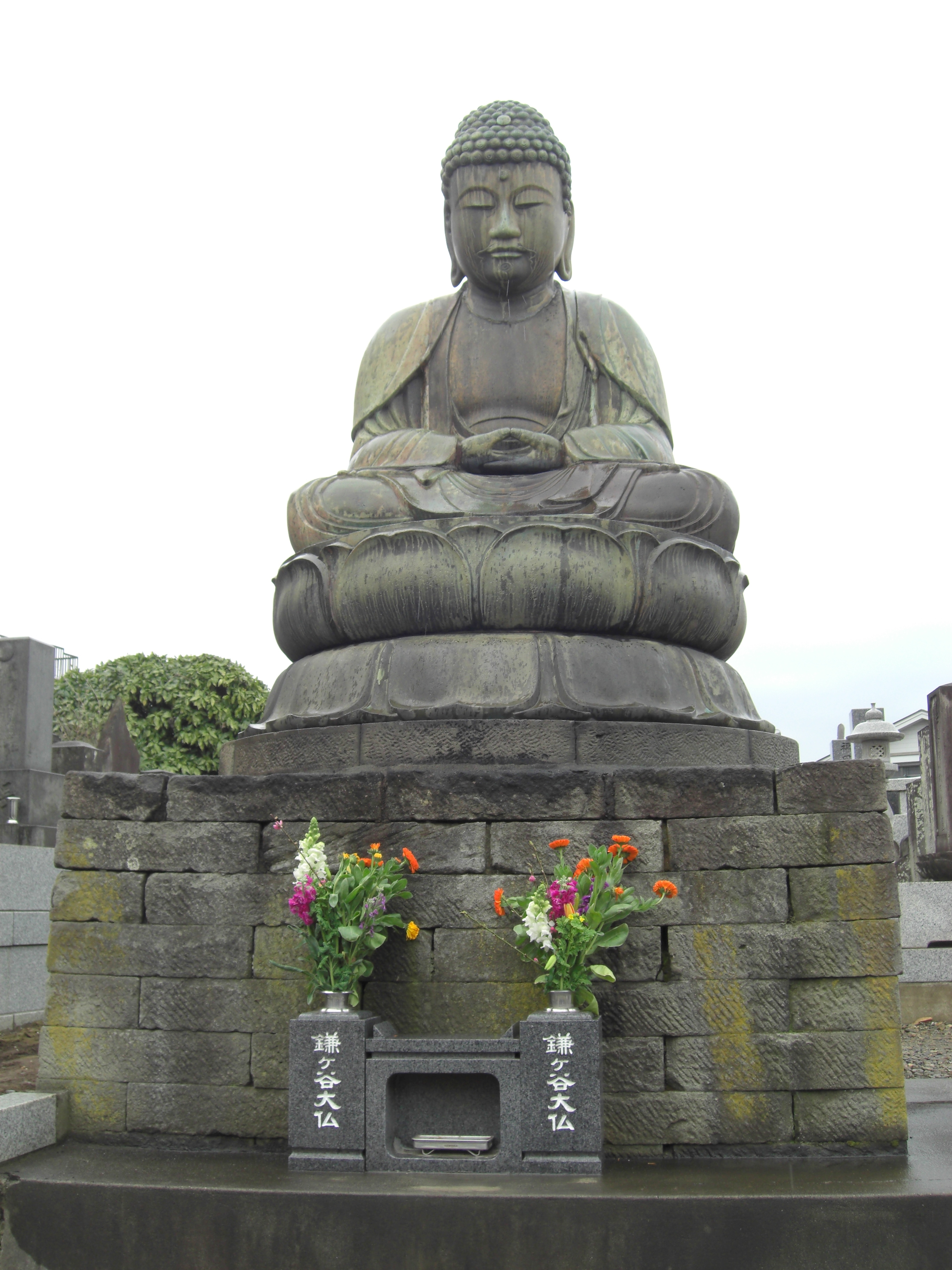
- Kamagaya Daibutsu

- Flag Seal

- Location of Kamagaya in Chiba Prefecture

- Coordinates: 35°46′36.6″N 140°00′2.9″E
- Country: Japan
- Region: Kantō
- Prefecture: Chiba

Government
  - Mayor: Hiromi Shibata (since July 2021)

Area
  - Total: 21.08 km^{2} (8.14 sq mi)

Population (December 1, 2020)
  - Total: 109,941
  - Density: 5,215/km^{2} (13,510/sq mi)
- Time zone: UTC+9 (Japan Standard Time)
- -Tree: Osmanthus
- Flower: Japanese pear and Japanese bellflower
- Phone number: 047-445-1141
- Address: 2-6-1, Shinkamagaya, Kamagaya-shi, Chiba-ken 273-0195
- Website: Official website

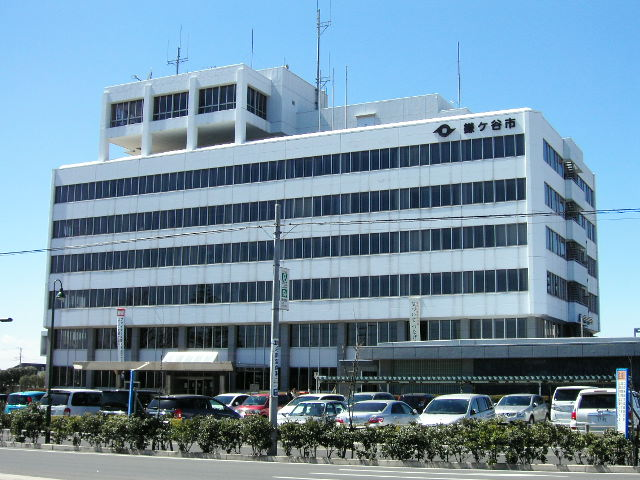
Kamagaya City Hall

Kamagaya (鎌ヶ谷市, Kamagaya-shi) is a city located in Chiba Prefecture, Japan. As of 1 December 2020, the city had an estimated population of 109,941 living in 50,485 households and a population density of 5,200 persons per km^{2}. The total area of the city is 21.08 km^{2} (8.14 sq mi).

== Geography ==
Kamagaya is located in the northwestern corner of Chiba Prefecture, approximately 20 kilometers from the prefectural capital of Chiba. It is located on the Shimōsa Plateau, with an elevation of seven to thirty meters above sea level. The Otsu River, which flows into Lake Teganuma, is to the north, and the Okashiwa and Nego rivers, and tributaries of the Ebi River, flow into Tokyo Bay to the south. The 140th east meridian runs through the center of the city.

=== Neighboring municipalities ===
Chiba Prefecture

- Funabashi
- Ichikawa
- Kashiwa
- Matsudo
- Shiroi

=== Climate ===
Kamagaya has a humid subtropical climate (Köppen Cfa) characterized by warm summers and cool winters with light to no snowfall. The average annual temperature in Kamagaya is 15.0 °C. The average annual rainfall is 1389 mm with September as the wettest month. The temperatures are highest on average in August, at around 26.6 °C, and lowest in January, at around 4.4 °C.

== Demographics ==
Per Japanese census data, Kamagaya's population experienced rapid growth in the late 20th century and has plateaued in the early 21st.

Historical population
Year	Pop.	±%
1920	4,160	—
1930	4,683	+12.6%
1940	5,333	+13.9%
1950	8,981	+68.4%
1960	13,496	+50.3%
1970	40,988	+203.7%
1980	76,157	+85.8%
1990	95,092	+24.9%
2000	102,573	+7.9%
2010	107,853	+5.1%
2020	109,932	+1.9%

== History ==
The area around Kamagaya has been inhabited since prehistory, and archaeologists have found Jōmon period shell middens in the area. During the Kamakura period, the area was controlled by the Sōma clan. Kamagaya flourished in the Edo period 1603–1868 when the area was largely tenryō territory within Shimōsa Province controlled directly by the Tokugawa shogunate. One part of present-day Kamagaya was part of the Kogane Ranch, which raised war horses for the army of the Tokugawa shogunate. In the Edo period Kamagaya was also a thriving shukuba post on the Kioroshi Road, which connected present-day Inzai on the Tone River to Edogawa-ku in Tokyo. The road was utilized to bring fresh fish and other marine products from the Tone River region to the capital Edo. After the Meiji Restoration, it became part of Chiba Prefecture. Kamagaya Village was one of several villages created on April 1, 1889 under Inba District with the establishment of the modern municipalities system. In 1945, the Imperial Japanese Army appropriated the former Musashino Country Club, turning the golf course into an air field. The base was turned over to the United States Air Force after World War II, becoming Shiroi Air Base, and was transferred to the Japan Maritime Self-Defense Force in 1959, becoming JMSDF Shimofusa Air Base. Kamagaya became a town on August 1, 1968, and was elevated to city status on September 1, 1971.

== Government ==
Kamagaya has a mayor-council form of government with a directly elected mayor and a unicameral city council of 24 members. Kamagaya contributes two members to the Chiba Prefectural Assembly. In terms of national politics, the city is part of Chiba 13th district of the lower house of the Diet of Japan.

== Economy ==
Kamagaya, formerly a farming area, is now a regional commercial center. Due to its numerous train connections it serves as a transportation hub and bedroom community for nearby Chiba and Tokyo. Kamagaya's trademark produce is the round, Nashi Pear, and there are many pear orchards dotted about the city, whose white blossoms open toward the end of the cherry blossom season.

== Education ==
Kamagaya has nine public elementary schools and five public middle schools operated by the city government, and two public high schools operated by the Chiba Prefectural Board of Education.

== Transportation ==
=== Railway ===
Tobu Railway – Tobu Noda Line

- Shin-Kamagaya – Kamagaya

Keisei Electric Railway – Keisei Matsudo Line

- Kunugiyama – Kita-Hatsutomi – Shin-Kamagaya – Hatsutomi – Kamagaya-Daibutsu

Hokusō Railway – Hokusō Line

- Shin-Kamagaya

Keisei Electric Railway – Narita Sky Access

- Shin-Kamagaya

=== Highway ===
- National Route 464

== Local attractions ==
- Kamagaya Daibutsu

== Sister cities ==
- Whakatāne, New Zealand, since November 16, 1997
