= Shin-Kamagaya Station =

Railway station in Kamagaya, Chiba Prefecture, Japan

HS08 KS78 TD30 Shin-Kamagaya Station 新鎌ヶ谷駅
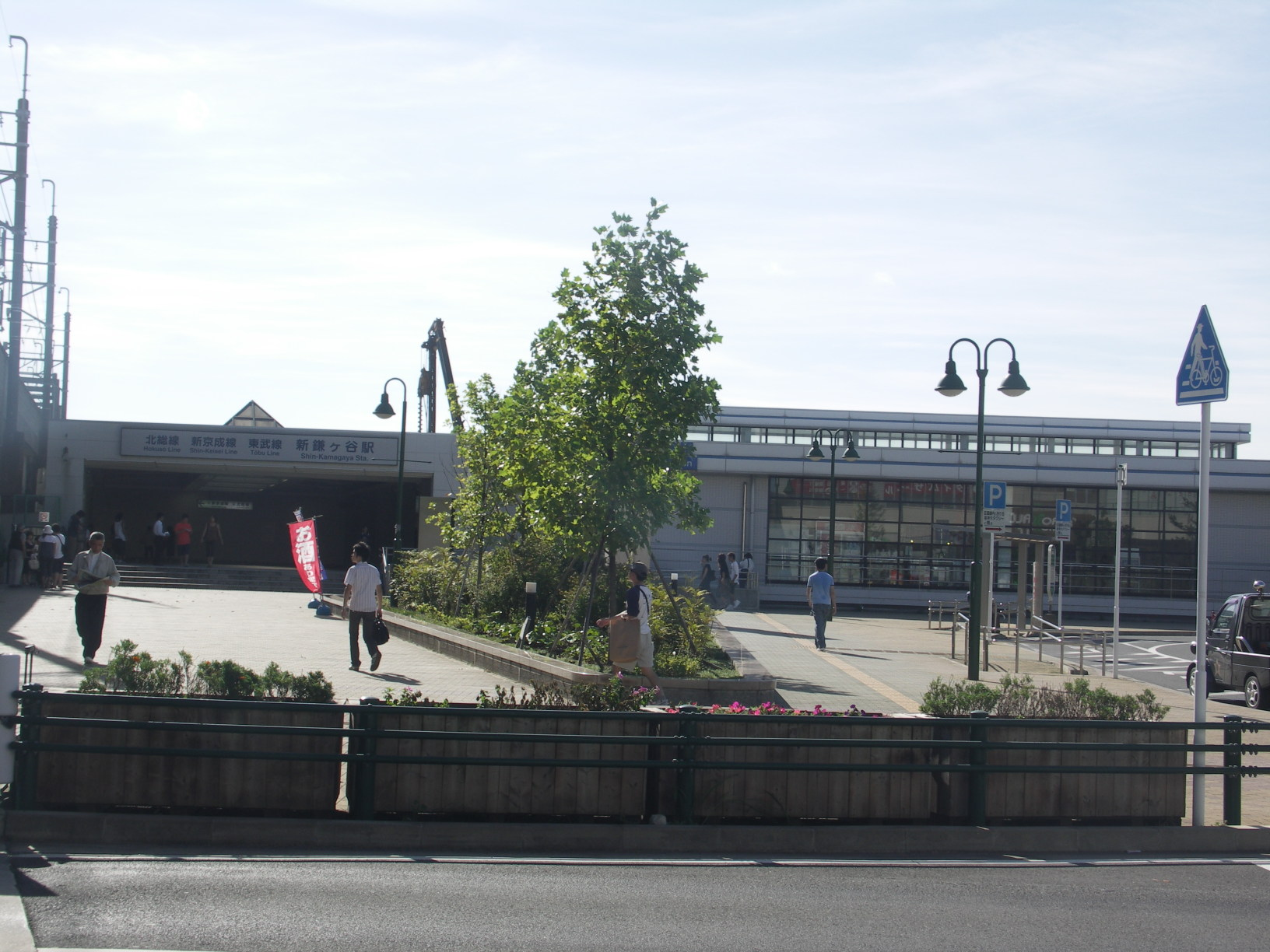
- Shin-Kamagaya Station

General information
- Location: Shin-Kamagaya, Kamagaya-shi, Chiba-ken 273-0107; Japan
- Coordinates: 35°46′46″N 139°59′54″E
- Operator: Hokuso Railway; Keisei Electric Railway; Tobu Railway
- Lines: Hokusō Line; Narita Sky Access Line; Keisei Matsudo Line; Tobu Urban Park Line

Other information
- Station code: HS08 (Hokuso Line); KS78 (Keisei); TD-30 (Tobu)

History
- Opened: 31 March 1991; 35 years ago

Passengers
- FY2018: 102,914 daily
Services
Preceding station	Keisei	Following station
Aoto KS09 towards Keisei Ueno	Skyliner (limited service)	Narita Airport Terminal 2·3 KS41 towards Narita Airport Terminal 1
Kita-Hatsutomi KS79 towards Matsudo	Matsudo Line	Hatsutomi KS77 towards Keisei Tsudanuma
Higashi-Matsudo HS05 towards Keisei-Takasago	Narita Sky Access Line Access Express	Chiba New Town Chūō HS12 towards Narita Airport Terminal 1
Preceding station	Hokusō Railway	Following station
Higashi-Matsudo HS05 towards Keisei Takasago	Hokusō Line Limited Express	Nishi-Shiroi HS09 towards Imba Nihon-idai
Ōmachi HS07 towards Keisei Takasago	Hokusō Line Local	Nishi-Shiroi HS09 towards Imba Nihon-idai
Preceding station	Tobu Railway	Following station
Takayanagi TD28 towards Ōmiya	Tōbu Urban Park Line Express	Funabashi TD35 Terminus
Mutsumi TD29 towards Ōmiya	Tōbu Urban Park Line Local	Kamagaya TD31 towards Funabashi
Location
- Location within Chiba Prefecture Location within Japan

Shin-Kamagaya Station (新鎌ヶ谷駅, Shin-Kamagaya-eki) is a junction passenger railway station in the city of Kamagaya, Chiba Prefecture, Japan, operated jointly by the third sector Hokusō Railway and the private railway operators Keisei Electric Railway and Tōbu Railway.

== Lines ==
Shin-Kamagaya Station is served by the following lines.

- Hokusō Railway
  - Hokusō Line
- Keisei Electric Railway
  - Narita Sky Access Line
  - Matsudo Line
- Tobu Railway
  - Tobu Urban Park Line

== Station Layout ==
=== Keisei Matsudo Line Platforms ===
The Keisei Matsudo Line section consists of a single island platform serving two tracks.

1	Keisei Matsudo Line	for Kita-Narashino, Shin-Tsudanuma, and Keisei Tsudanuma; Keisei Chiba Line for Chiba-Chūō
2	Keisei Matsudo Line	for Yabashira and Matsudo

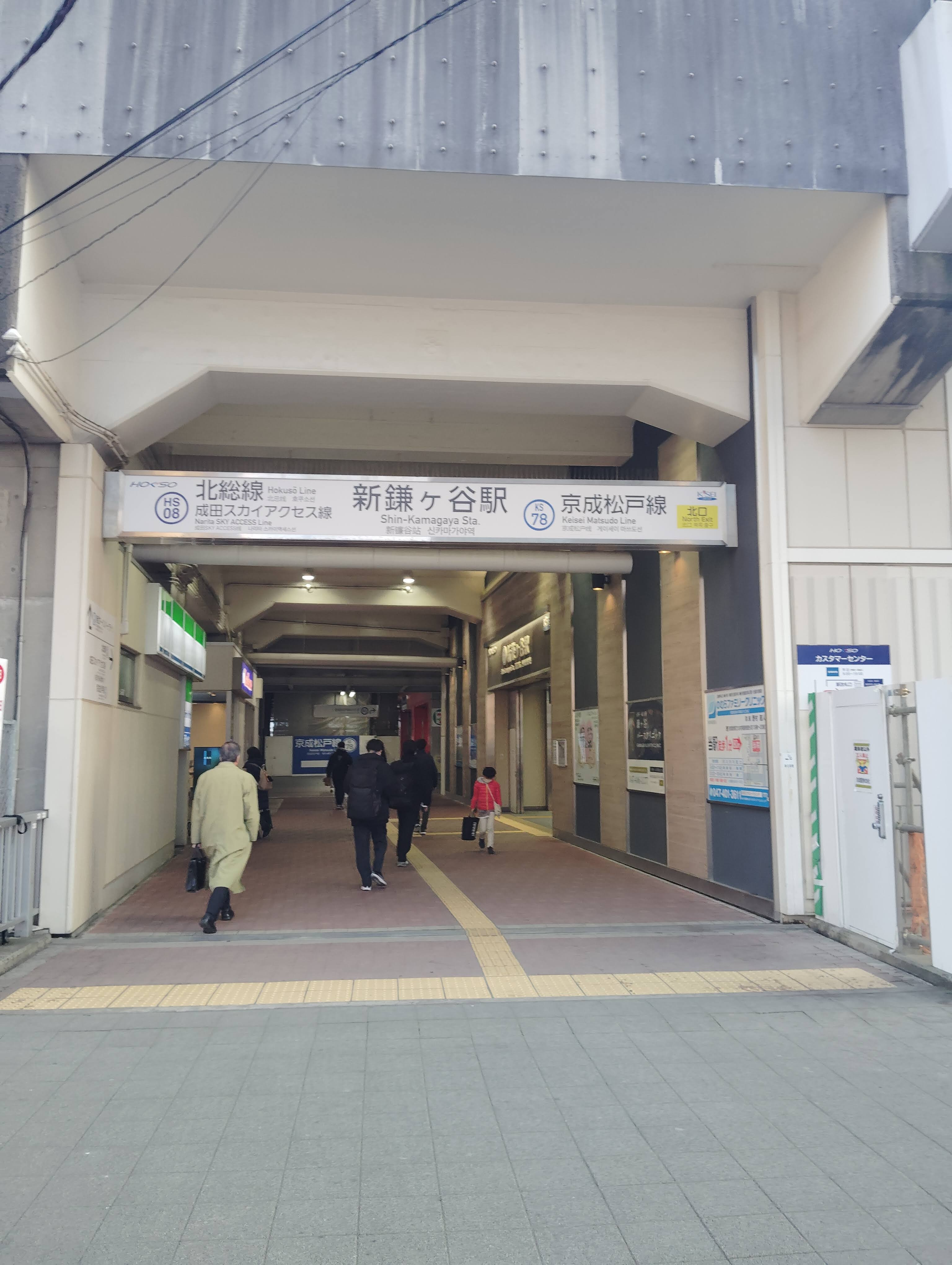
Hokusō, Keisei Narita Sky Access, and Keisei Matsudo Line entrance

=== Hokusō and Keisei Narita Sky Access Line Platforms ===
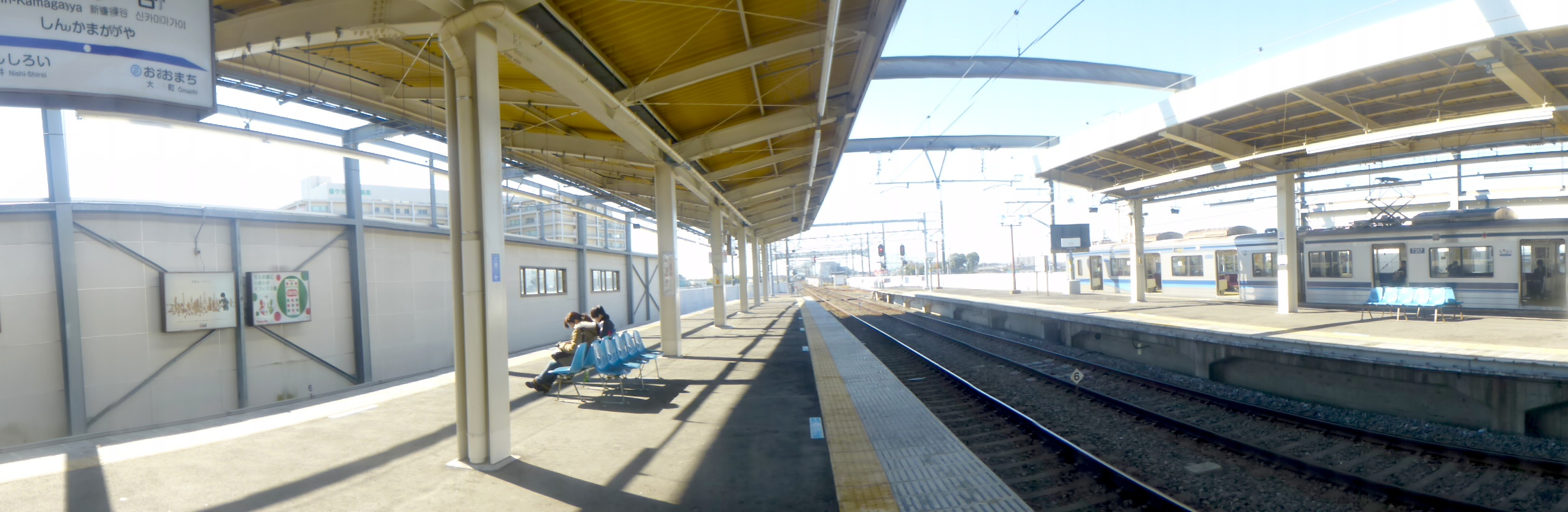
Station platforms, 2013

The Hokusō and Keisei Narita Sky Access Line section consists of two elevated island platforms serving two tracks.

1-2	Hokusō Line	for Keisei Takasago; Keisei Line for Oshiage; Toei Asakusa Line for Nihombashi, Sengakuji, and Nishi-magome; Keikyū Line for Shinagawa, Haneda Airport (International Terminal and Domestic Terminal), Yokohama, and Misakiguchi
1-2	Narita Sky Access Line	for Keisei Takasago; Keisei Line for Nippori, Ueno, and Oshiage; Toei Asakusa Line for Nihombashi, Sengakuji, and Nishi-magome; Keikyū Line for Shinagawa, Haneda Airport, Yokohama, and Keikyū Kurihama
3-4	Hokusō Line	for Chiba New Town Chūō and Imba Nihon-Idai
3-4	Narita Sky Access Line	for Chiba New Town Chūō, Imba Nihon-Idai and Narita Airport (Terminal 2·3 and Terminal 1)

=== Tōbu Platforms ===
The Tobu section consists of two opposite side platforms serving two tracks.

1	Tobu Urban Park Line	for Kashiwa and Ōmiya
2	Tobu Urban Park Line	for Funabashi

== History ==
The station opened on 31 March 1991, served initially by the Hokuso Railway. The Shin-Keisei station opened on 8 July 1992, and the Tōbu Railway station (originally the Tōbu Noda Line) opened on 25 November 1999.

Effective April 2025, the Shin-Keisei platforms came under the aegis of Keisei Electric Railway as the result of the buyout of the Shin-Keisei Railway. The move was completed on 1 April 2025.

== Passenger statistics ==
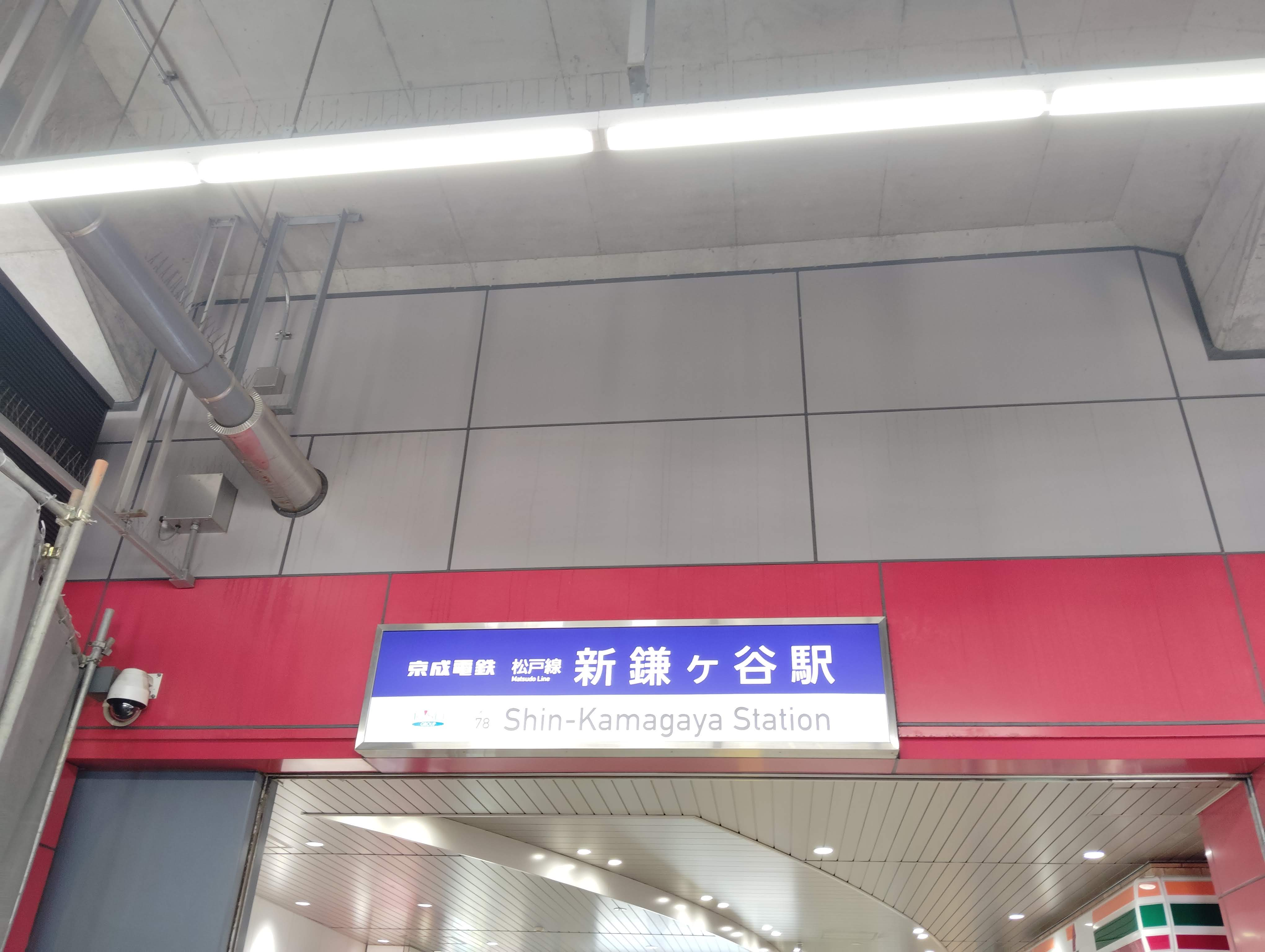
Keisei Matsudo Line entrance

In fiscal 2017, the Hokusō Railway portion of the station was used by an average of 22,184 passengers daily. The Keisei portion of the station was used by 4,476 passengers and the Shin-Keisei portion of the station was used by 34,156 passengers. The Tōbu Railway portion of the station was used by 40,389 passengers daily.

== See also ==
- List of railway stations in Japan
