= Shin-Keisei Electric Railway =

Defunct Japanese railway company

Shin-Keisei Electric Railway Co., Ltd.
- Native name: 新京成電鉄株式会社
- Company type: Public KK (TYO: 9014)
- Industry: Private railroad
- Founded: October 23, 1946
- Defunct: March 31, 2025
- Fate: Merged with Keisei Electric Railway
- Headquarters: Kunugiyama, Kamagaya, Chiba, Japan
- Key people: Takayoshi Kasai (President)
- Number of employees: 460 (2015)
- Parent: Keisei Electric Railway
- Subsidiaries: Funabashi Shin-Keisei Bus; Matsudo Shin-Keisei Bus
- Website: www.shinkeisei.co.jp

Linemap of Shin-Keisei Electric Railway

Shin-Keisei Electric Railway mon

The Shin-Keisei Electric Railway (新京成電鉄, Shin-Keisei Dentetsu) was a private railway in Chiba Prefecture, Japan. It connects Narashino and Matsudo. It was a subsidiary of Keisei Electric Railway.

It also operated the following bus company subsidiaries.

- Funabashi Shin-Keisei Bus
- Matsudo Shin-Keisei Bus

== Lines ==
The company operated one line, the 26.5 km (16.5 mi) Shin-Keisei Line, between Matsudo and Keisei Tsudanuma.

== Rolling stock ==
- 8800 series (since 1986)
- 8900 series (since 1993)
- N800 series (since 2005)
- 80000 series (since 27 December 2019)

All trains were based at Kunugiyama and Tsudanuma Depots.

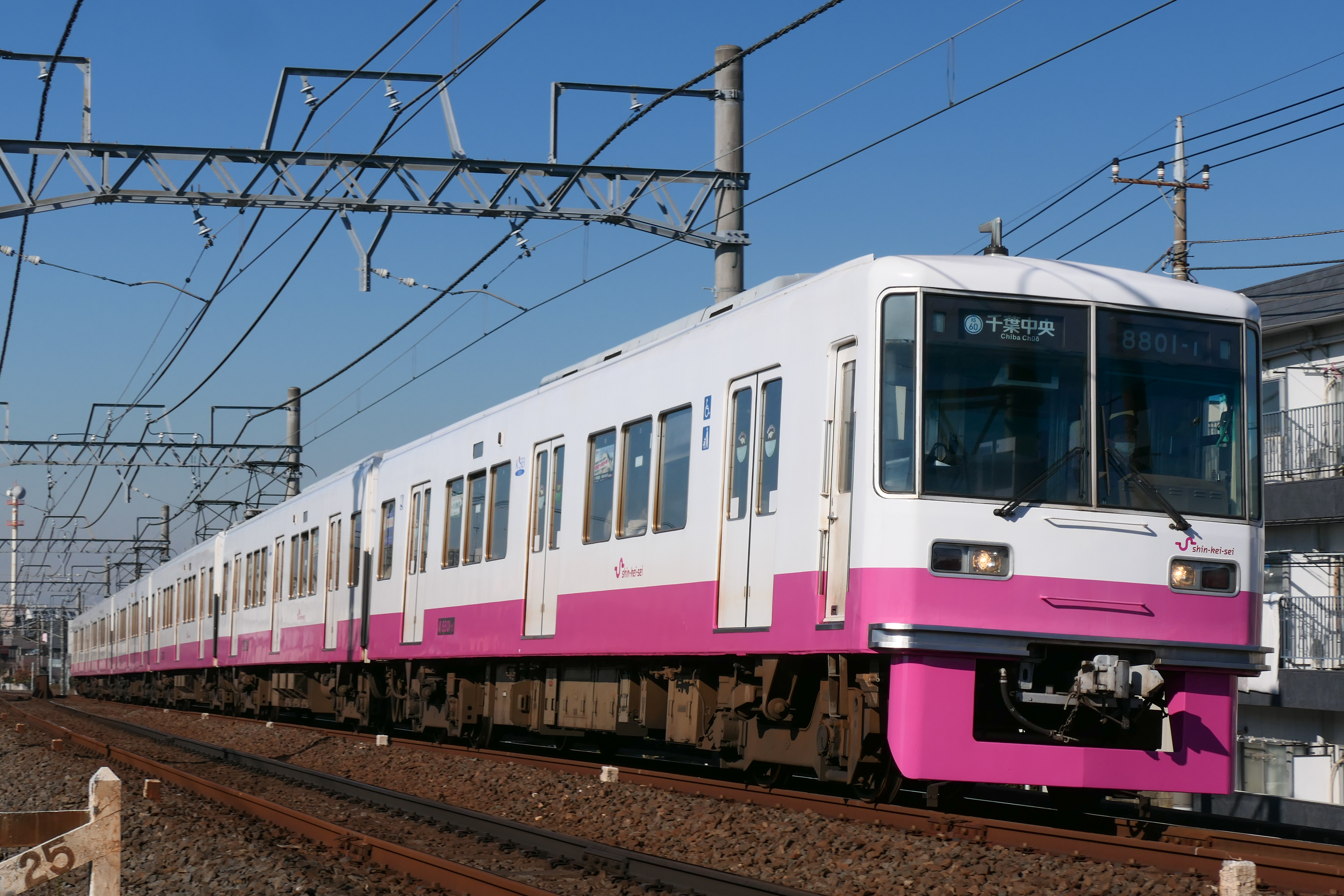
Shin-Keisei 8800 series

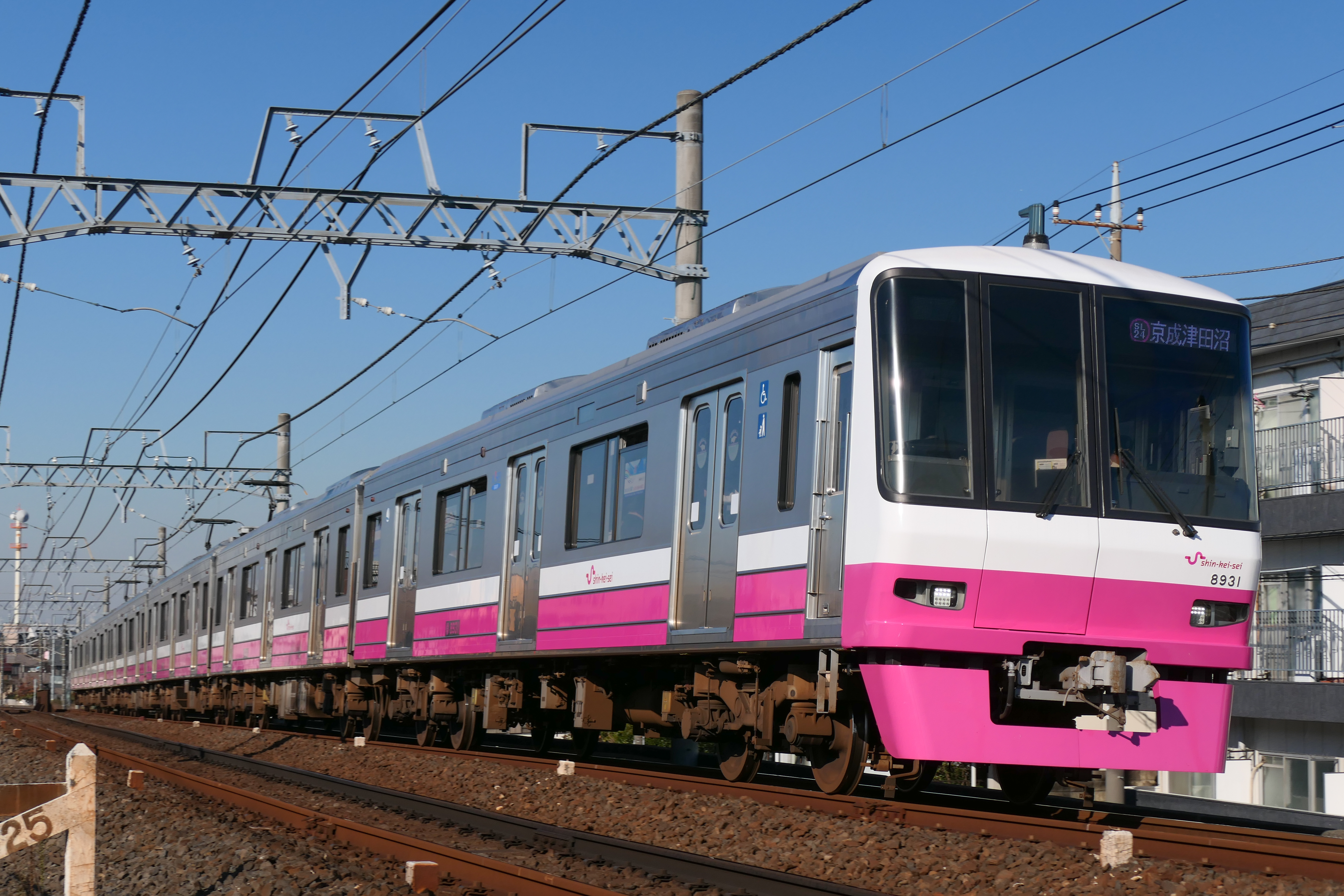
Shin-Keisei 8900 series

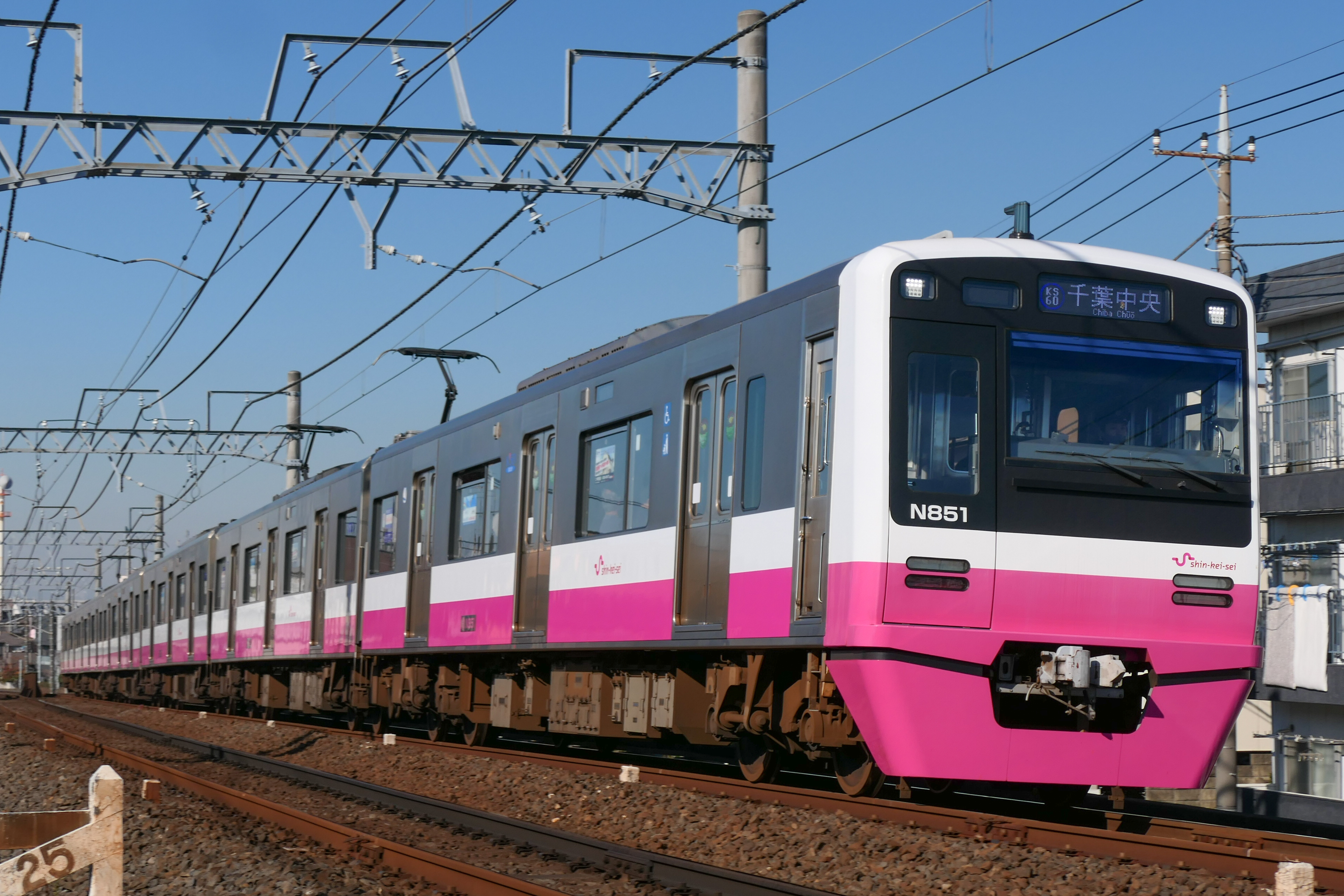
Shin-Keisei N800 series

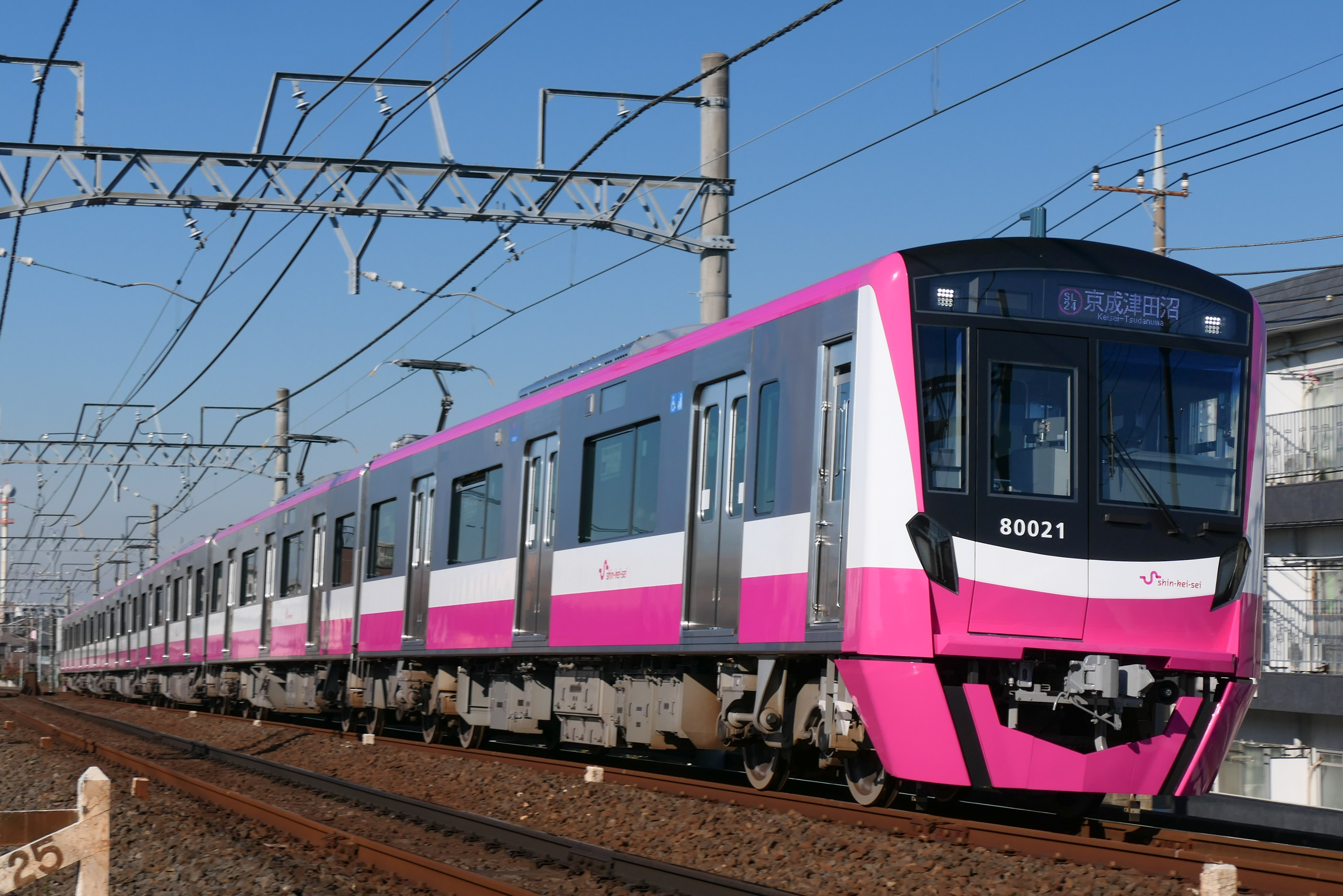
Shin-Keisei 80000 series

=== Former rolling stock ===
- 800 series (1971 – July 2010)
- 8000 series (1978 – November 2021)
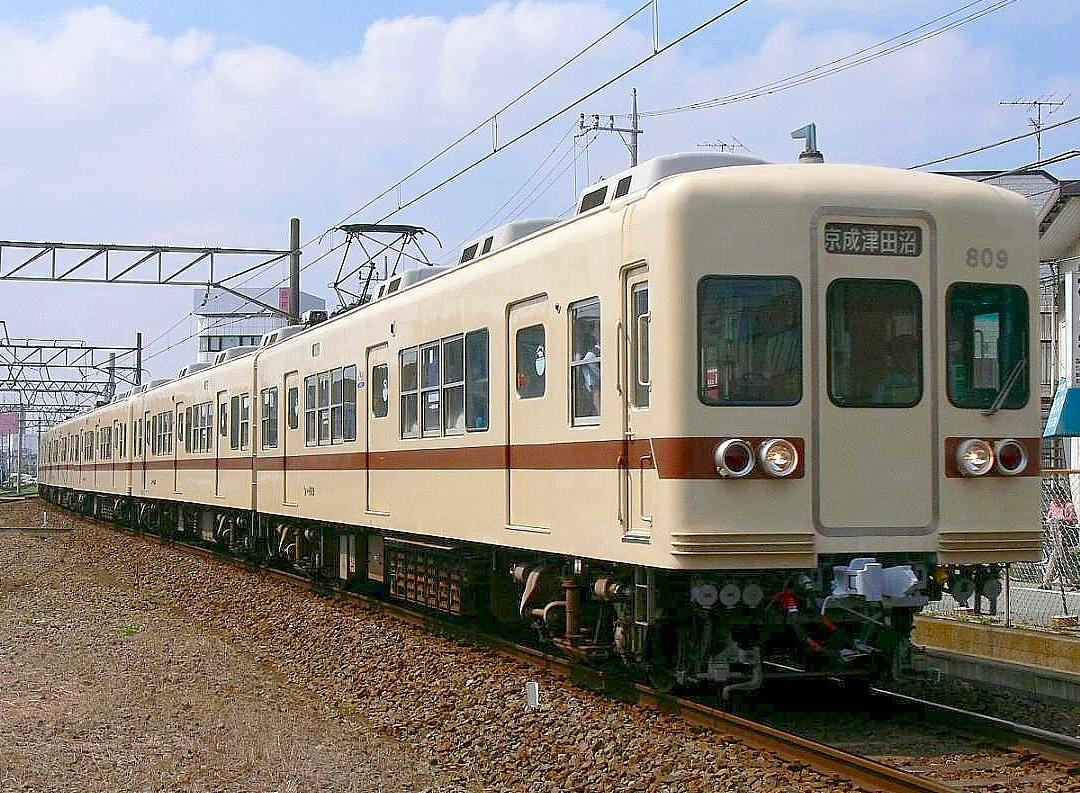
Shin-Keisei 800 series

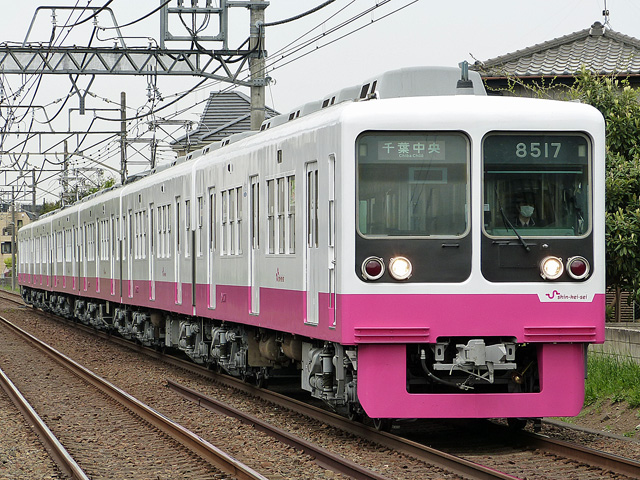
Shin-Keisei 8000 series

== History ==
After World War II, the ownership of the right-of-way of an uncompleted Imperial Japanese Army military railway line was transferred to Keisei. Shin-Keisei was established as a subsidiary of Keisei on 23 October 1946 to construct and operate the line. The first section of the line, 2.5 km (1.6 mi) from Shin-Tsudanuma to Yakuendai, was opened on 27 December 1947, with a track gauge of 1,067 mm (3 ft 6 in) and electrified at 1,500 V DC overhead. The line was regauged to 1,372 mm (4 ft 6 in) in October 1953, and the entire line was completed as a single-track line by 21 April 1955. In August 1959, the line was again regauged, this time to 1,435 mm (4 ft 8 1/2 in) to match the standard gauge used by Keisei Electric Railway.

In June 2014, the company unveiled a new corporate image with a new corporate logo and "gentle pink" corporate colour scheme and train livery. The company's entire fleet of trains was scheduled to be reliveried in the new colour scheme, with the first train, an 8800 series set entering service from 29 August 2014.

=== Merger with Keisei Electric Railway ===
In an announcement made on 31 October 2023, Shin-Keisei Electric Railway revealed that it would be merged into the parent Keisei Electric Railway. The acquisition was completed on 1 April 2025, and the line was renamed as the Keisei Matsudo Line. The merger also resulted in the bus company subsidiaries being acquired by parent company, Keisei Electric Railway.
