= Shin-Tsudanuma Station =

Railway station in Narashino, Chiba Prefecture, Japan

KS66 Shin-Tsudanuma Station 新津田沼駅
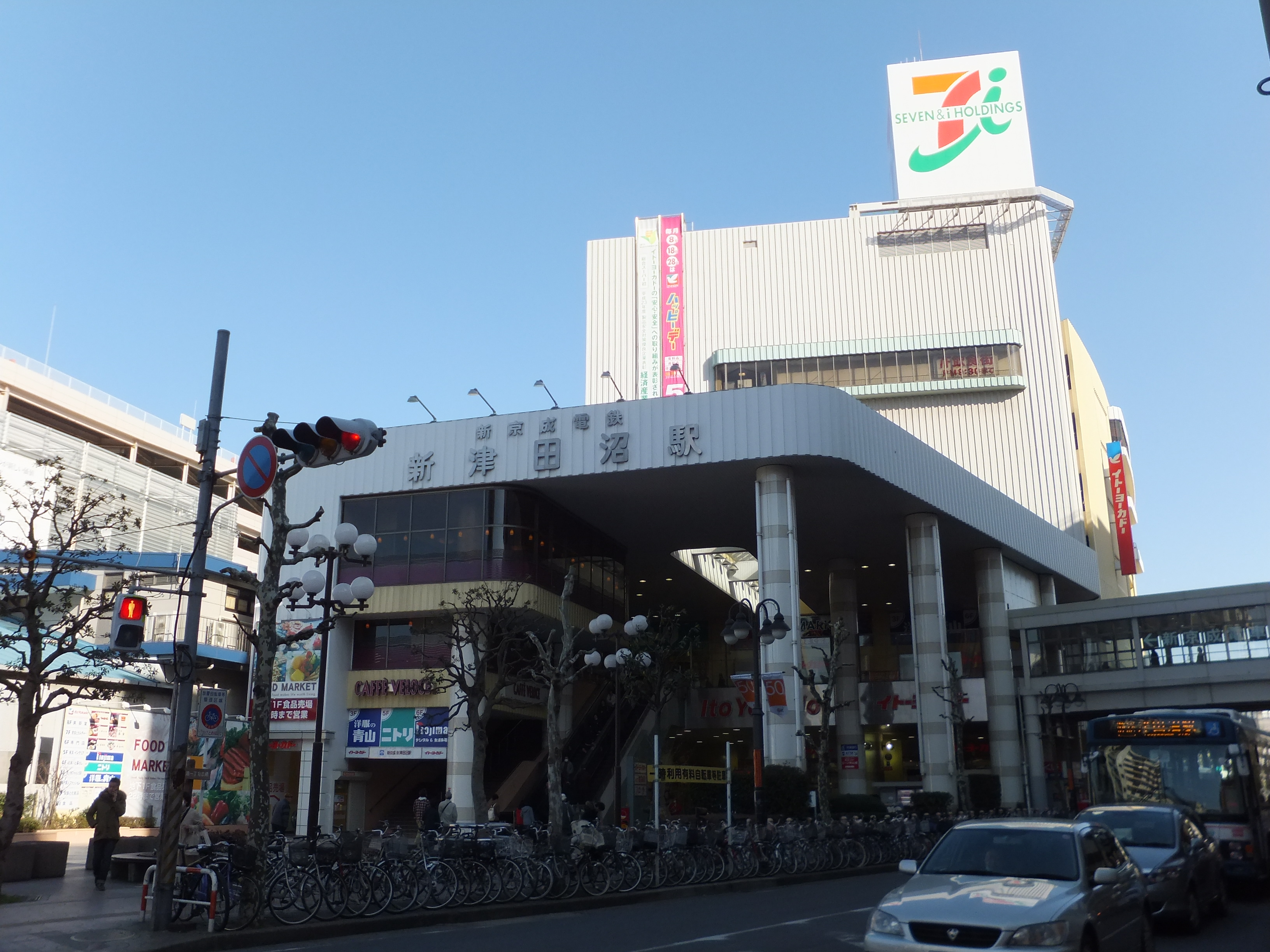
- Shin-Tsudanuma Station, March 2012

General information
- Location: 1-10-35 Tsudanuma, Narashino-shi, Chiba-ken 275-0016; Japan
- Coordinates: 35.6905°N 140.0239°E
- Operator: Keisei Electric Railway
- Line: Keisei Matsudo Line
- Distance: 25.3 km (15.7 mi) from Matsudo
- Platforms: 2 side platforms
- Tracks: 2
- Connections: JO26 JB33 Tsudanuma Station

Construction
- Structure type: At garde

Other information
- Station code: KS66
- Website: Official website

History
- Opened: 27 December 1947; 78 years ago

Passengers
- FY2019: 69,491

Services
| Preceding station | Keisei | Following station |
|---|---|---|
| Maebara KS67 towards Matsudo | Matsudo Line | Keisei Tsudanuma KS26 Terminus |
Location
- Location within Chiba Prefecture Location within Japan

Shin-Tsudanuma Station (新津田沼駅, Shin-Tsudanuma-eki) is a passenger railway station located in the city of Narashino, Chiba Prefecture Japan, operated by the private railway company, Keisei Electric Railway. The station is 400 meters from Tsudanuma Station on the JR East Sobu Main Line.

== Lines ==
Shin-Tsudanuma Station is served by the Keisei Matsudo Line, and is located 25.3 km from the official starting point of the line at Matsudo Station.

== Station layout ==
The station consists of two opposed side platforms connected by a footbridge.

=== Platforms ===
| 1 | Keisei Matsudo Line | for Keisei-Tsudanuma; Keisei Chiba Line for Chiba Chūō |
| 2 | Keisei Matsudo Line | for Kita-Narashino, Shin-Kamagaya, Yabashira, and Matsudo |

== History ==
Shin-Tsudanuma Station opened on December 27, 1947, although it was originally located 300 m from the current station. From 1953-1968, a spur line was extended from Maebara Station to Shin-Tsudanuma Station via Fujisakidai Station (藤崎台駅, Fujisakidai-eki), which replaced Shin-Tsudanuma Station from 1953 until it was closed to passenger service in 1961, at which point the original Shin-Tsudanuma Station was re-opened. The line was demolished in 1968 along with Fujisakidai Station; the current station was opened the same year.

On 1 April 2025, operations of the station came under the aegis of Keisei Electric Railway as the result of the buyout of the Shin-Keisei Electric Railway.

== Passenger statistics ==
In fiscal 2018, the station was used by an average of 69,491 passengers daily (boarding passengers only).

== Surrounding area ==
- Tsudanuma Station (Sobu Main Line)
- Central Narashino city

== See also ==
- List of railway stations in Japan
