= Matsudo Station =

Railway station in Matsudo, Chiba Prefecture, Japan

JJ06 JL22 KS88 Matsudo Station 松戸駅
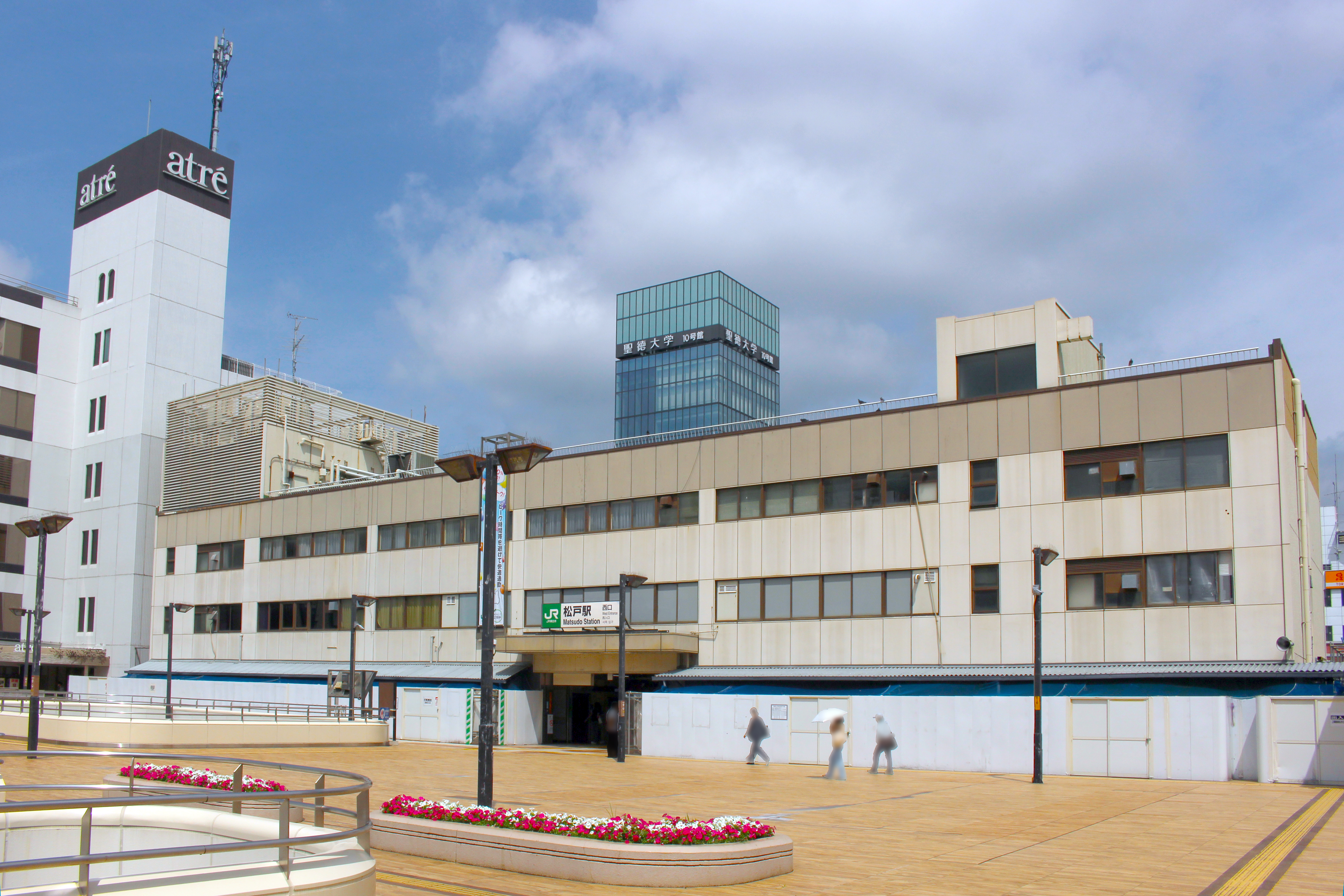
- West Exit, Matsudo Station in July 2024

General information
- Location: 1181 Matsudo, Matsudo-shi, Chiba-ken 271-0092; Japan
- Coordinates: 35.7843°N 139.9007°E
- Operator: JR East; Keisei Electric Railway
- Lines: Jōban Line (Rapid); Jōban Line (Local); Keisei Matsudo Line
- Distance: 15.7 km (9.8 mi) from Nippori
- Platforms: 4 island platforms

Other information
- Status: Staffed (Midori no Madoguchi)
- Station code: JJ06/JL22 (JR East) ○KS88 (Keisei)
- Website: Official website

History
- Opened: 25 December 1896; 129 years ago

Passengers
- FY2019: 100,062 daily (JR), 105,704 (Shin Keisei)

Services
Preceding station	JR East	Following station
Kita-Senju JJ05 towards Shinagawa	Jōban Line Special Rapid	Kashiwa JJ07 towards Tsuchiura
Kita-Senju JJ05 towards Shinagawa	Jōban Line (Rapid) Rapid	Kashiwa JJ07 towards Toride
Kita-Senju JJ05 towards Shinagawa	Jōban Line Local-Futsuu	Kashiwa JJ07 towards Sendai
Kanamachi JL21 towards Ayase	Jōban Line (Local) Local-Kankō	Kita-Matsudo JL23 towards Toride
Preceding station	Keisei	Following station
Terminus	Matsudo Line	Kamihongō KS87 towards Keisei Tsudanuma
Location
- Location within Chiba Prefecture Location within Japan

Matsudo Station (松戸駅, Matsudo-eki) is an interchange railway station in the city of Matsudo, Chiba, Japan, operated by East Japan Railway Company (JR East) and the private railway company Keisei Electric Railway.

== Lines ==
Matsudo Station is served by the Jōban Line and is 15.7 km from the terminus of the line at Nippori Station in Tokyo. It is also the terminus for the Keisei Matsudo Line and is 26.5 kilometers from the opposing terminus at Keisei Tsudanuma Station.

== Station layout ==
The station consists of four island platforms serving eight tracks. The JR portion of the station has a Midori no Madoguchi staffed ticket office.

=== Platforms ===
1-2	Jōban Line (Rapid)	for Kashiwa, Toride, Narita, Tsuchiura, Ishioka and Mito
2-3	Jōban Line (Rapid)	for Kita-Senju, Nippori, Ueno; Ueno-Tokyo Line for Tokyo and Shinagawa
4-5	Jōban Line (Local)	for Shim-Matsudo, Abiko, and Toride
5-6	Jōban Line (Local)	for Ayase; Tokyo Metro Chiyoda Line for Kita-senju and Yoyogi-uehara; Odakyu Odawara Line for Hon-Atsugi and Isehara
7-8	Keisei Matsudo Line	for Yabashira, Shin-Kamagaya, Kita-Narashino, Shin-Tsudanuma, and Keisei-Tsudanuma; Keisei Chiba Line for Keisei Makuharihongō, Keisei Chiba, and Chiba-Chūō

== History ==
Matsudo Station opened on December 25, 1896 as a station on the Nippon Railway Tsuchiura Line. It was nationalised on November 1, 1906, becoming part of the Japanese Government Railways (JGR) and the line name changed on October 12, 1909 to the Jōban Line. JGR became Japanese National Railways (JNR) after World War II. The Shin-Keisei Line began operations from April 21, 1955. The station was absorbed into the JR East network upon the privatization of JNR on April 1, 1987.

Effective April 2025, the Shin-Keisei platforms were absorbed by the Keisei Electric Railway as the result of a buyout. The acquisition was completed on 1 April 2025.

== Passenger statistics ==
In the 2015 data available from Japan’s Ministry of Land, Infrastructure, Transport and Tourism, Matsudo → Kita Senju of the Joban (Rapid) line was one of the train segments among Tokyo's most crowded train lines during rush hour.

In fiscal 2019, the JR East station was used by an average of 100,062 passengers daily (boarding passengers only), making it the 39th-busiest station operated by JR East. In fiscal 2019, the Shin-Keisei Electric Railway station was used by an average of 105,704 passengers daily (boarding passengers only), making it the busiest station operated by the company. The daily passenger figures (boarding passengers only) for the JR East station in previous years are as shown below.

Fiscal year	Daily average
2000	104,051
2005	101,602
2010	99,468
2015	100,079

== Surrounding area ==
- Seitoku University
- Tojogaoka Historic Park
- Matsudo City Hall

== See also ==
- List of railway stations in Japan
