= 80000 series =

80000 series may refer to:

== Japanese train types ==
- Kintetsu 80000 series EMU
- Shin-Keisei 80000 series EMU
- Tobu 80000 series EMU

== Other train types ==
- TCDD HT80000 High speed trainsets for the Turkish State Railways
