= Shin-Keisei 8800 series =

Japanese train type

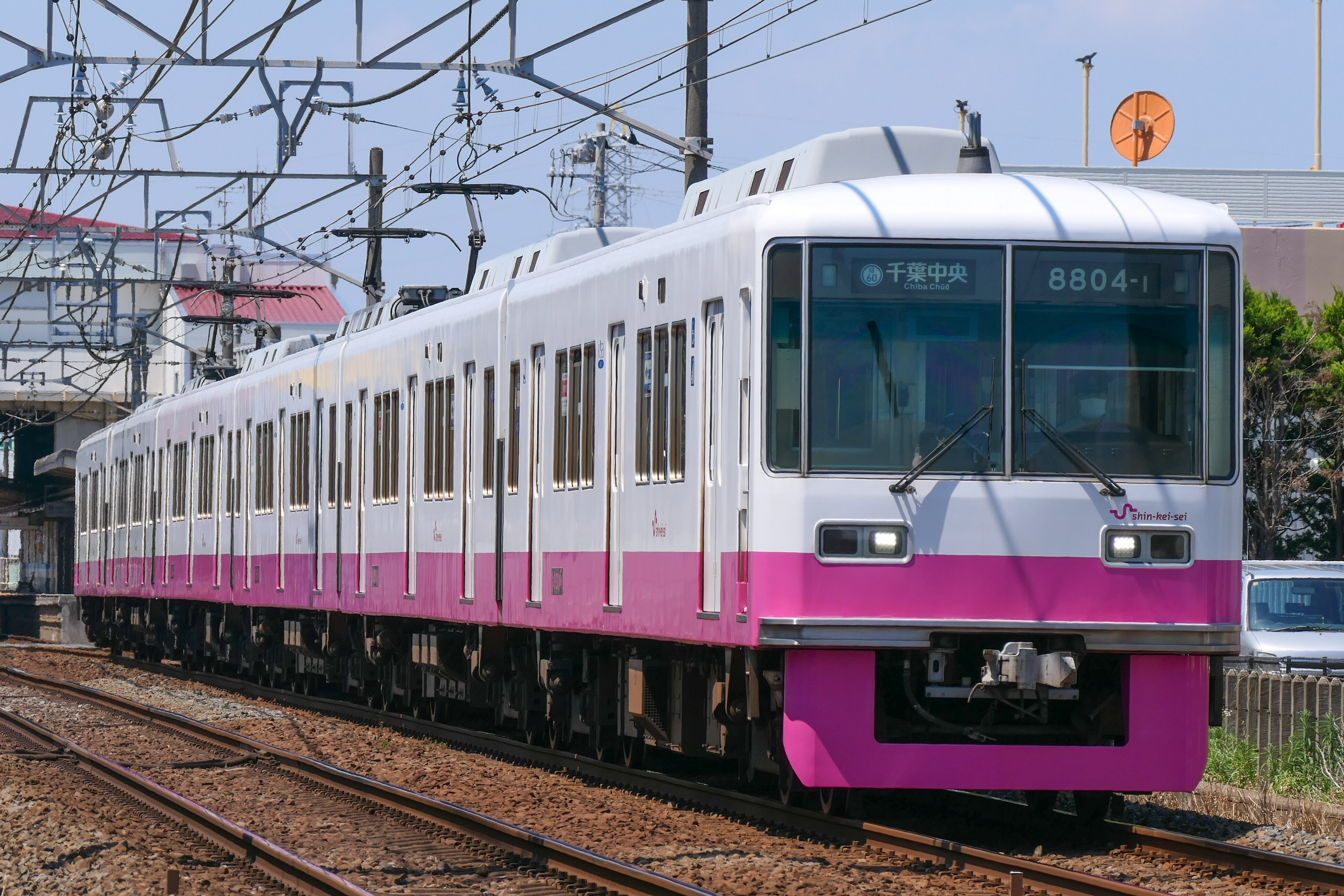
- Set 8804 in revised livery in June 2021
- Manufacturer: Nippon Sharyo
- Constructed: 1986–1991
- Entered service: 26 February 1986
- Refurbished: 2017–
- Number built: 96 vehicles (12 sets)
- Number in service: 96 vehicles (16 sets)
- Formation: 6 cars per set
- Fleet numbers: 8801–8816
- Operator: Keisei
- Depot: Kunugiyama
- Lines served: Keisei Matsudo Line; Keisei Chiba Line

Specifications
- Car body construction: Steel
- Car length: 18 m (59 ft 1 in)
- Doors: 3 pairs per side
- Traction system: Variable frequency (GTO)
- Electric system: 1,500 V DC
- Current collection: Overhead wire
- Track gauge: 1,435 mm (4 ft 8 1/2 in)

The Shin-Keisei 8800 series (新京成8800形) is an electric multiple unit (EMU) train type operated by the private railway operator Keisei Electric Railway. The type was introduced by the Shin-Keisei Electric Railway on the Shin-Keisei Line (Keisei Matsudo Line from April 2025) in Chiba Prefecture, Japan, in 1986.

On 1 April 2025, all cars were transferred to Keisei following the merger of the Shin-Keisei Electric Railway into Keisei Electric Railway.

== Formations ==
As of 1 April 2015, the fleet consists of 16 six-car sets based at Kunugiyama Depot with three motored (M) cars and three trailer (T) cars, formed as shown below, with the Tc1 car at the Tsudanuma end.

Designation	Tc1	M1	M2	T	M	Tc2
Numbering	88xx-1	88xx-2	88xx-3	88xx-4	88xx-5	88xx-6

- The M and M2 cars are each fitted with two lozenge-type pantographs. Sets 8804, 8808, 8812, and 8816 have single-arm pantographs.
- The T car is designated as having mild air-conditioning.

== Interior ==
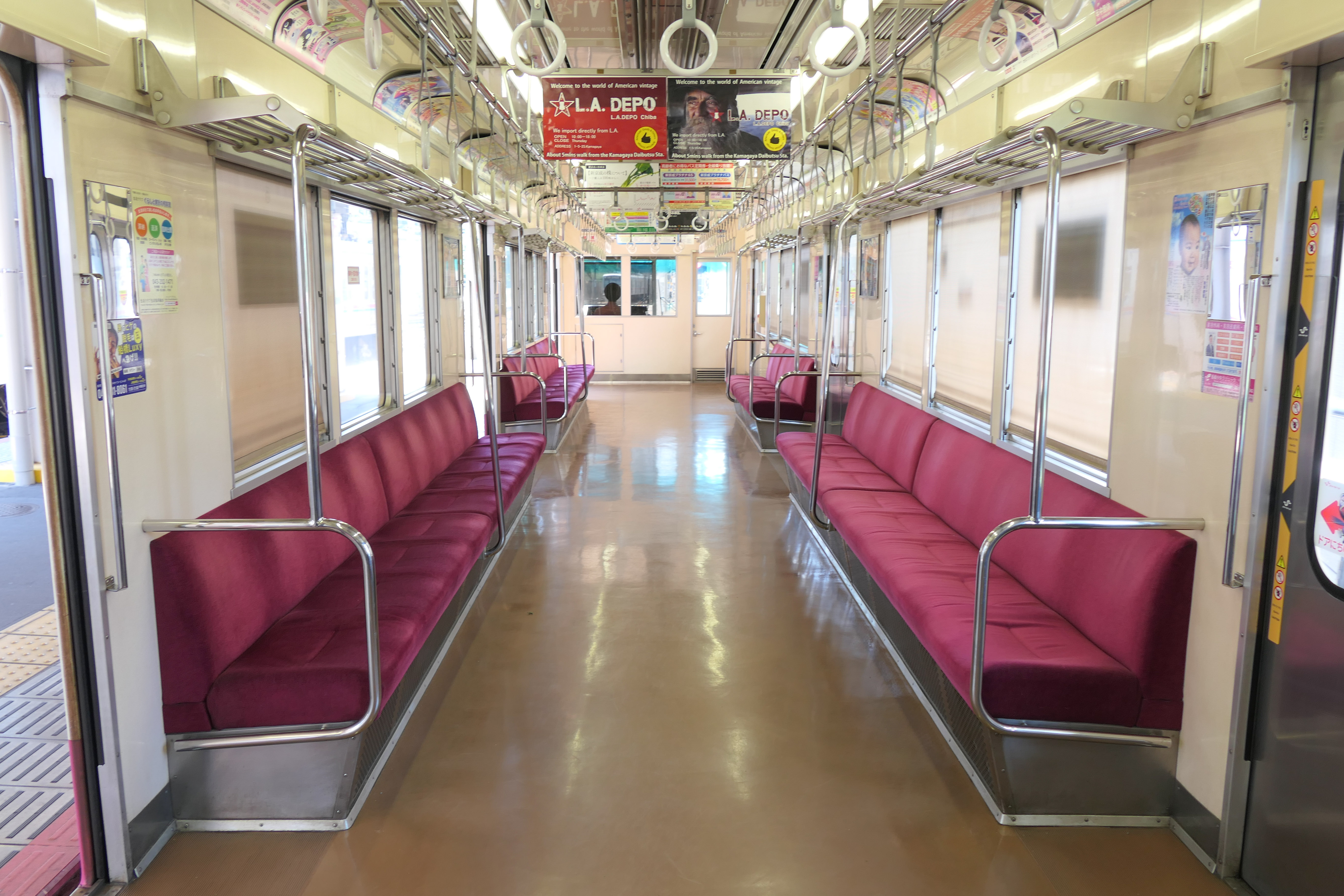
Interior view

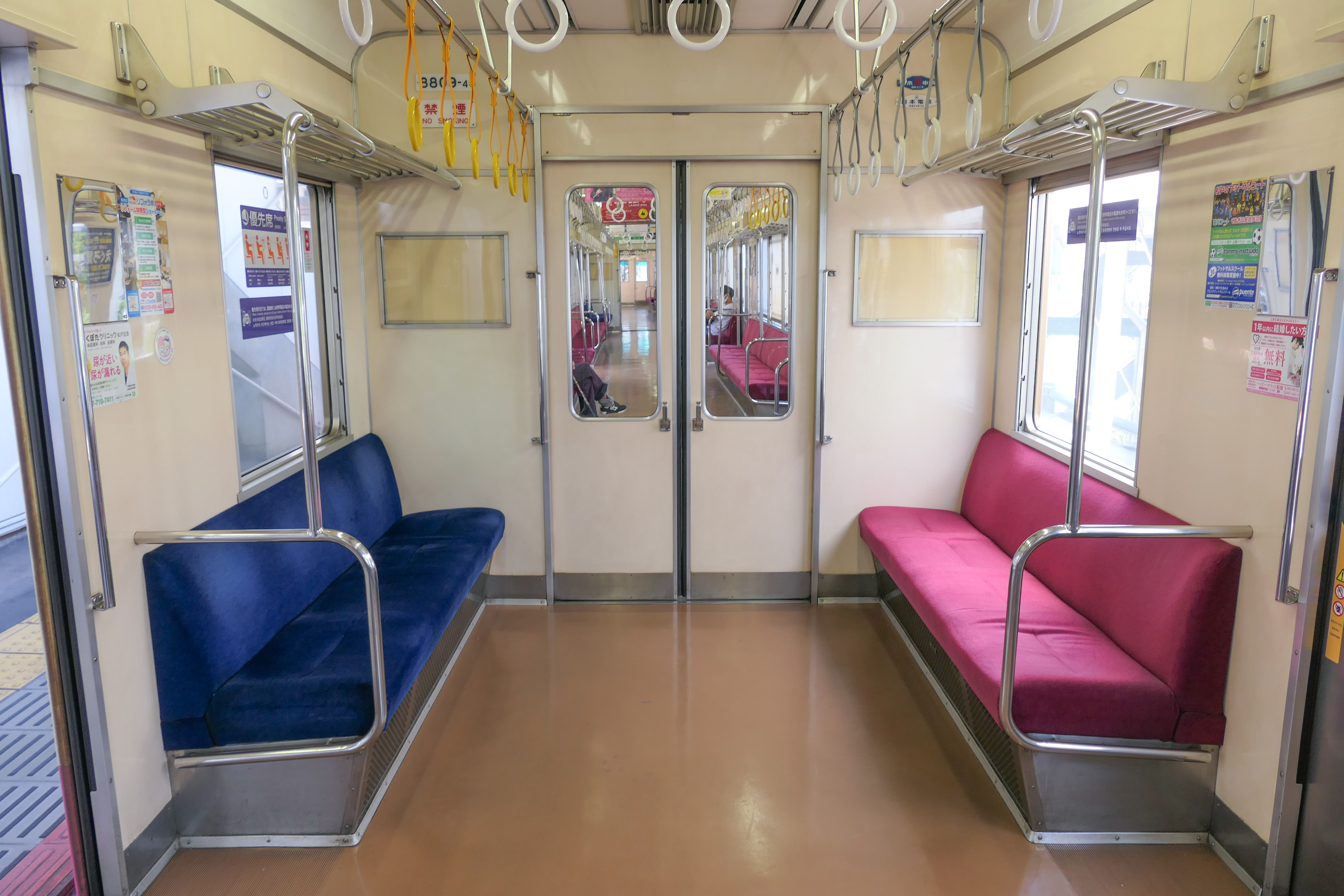
Priority seating

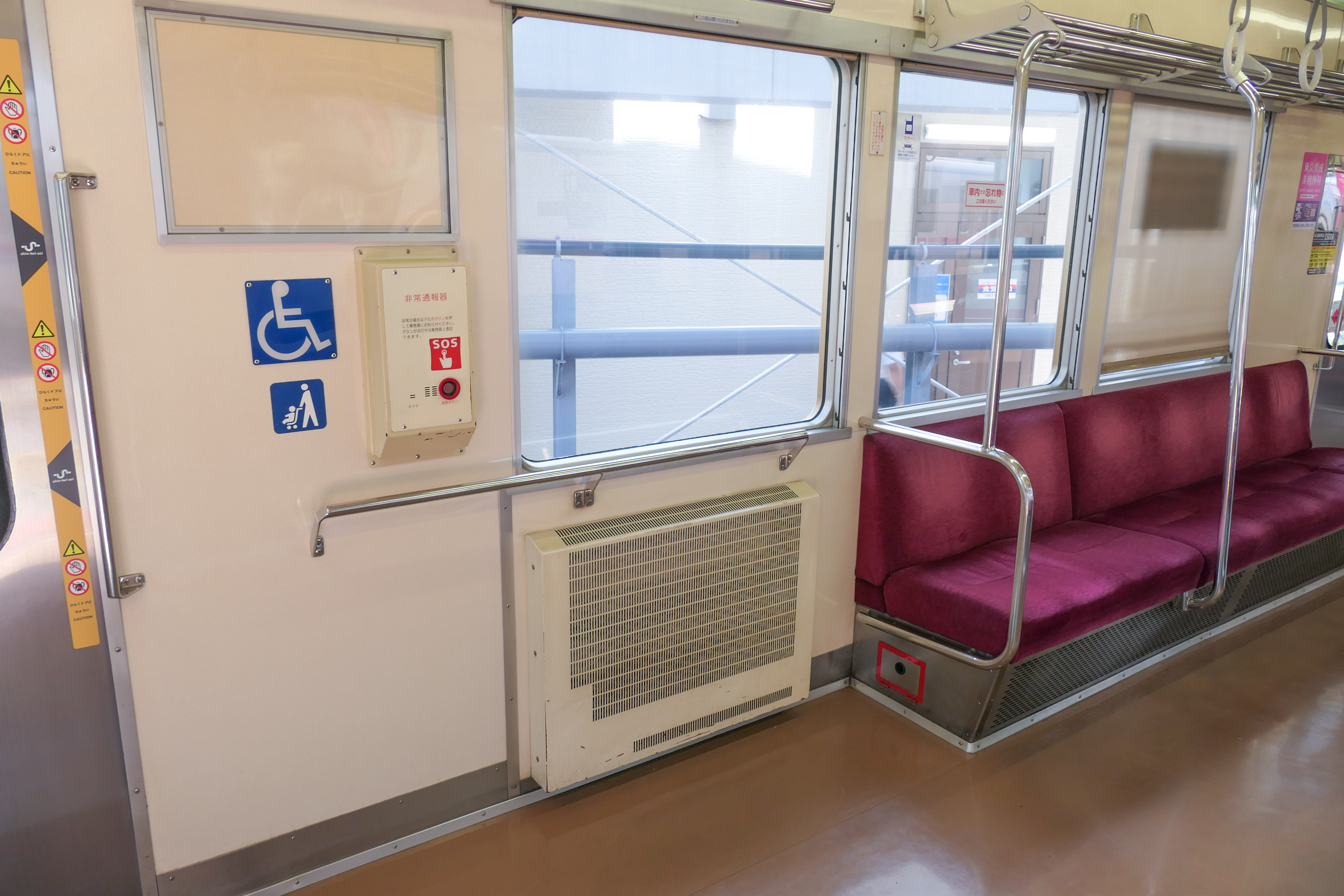
Wheelchair- and stroller-accessible free space

== History ==
The trains were originally formed as eight-car sets, with the first set introduced on 26 February 1986. This was followed by four more sets in 1987, two sets in 1988, two sets in 1989, two sets in 1990, and one set in 1991.

The original eight-car sets were formed as follows. The two M2 cars were each fitted with two lozenge-type pantographs.

Designation	Tc1	M1	M2	T2	T1	M1	M2	Tc2
Numbering	88xx	88xx	88xx	88xx	88xx	88xx	88xx	88xx

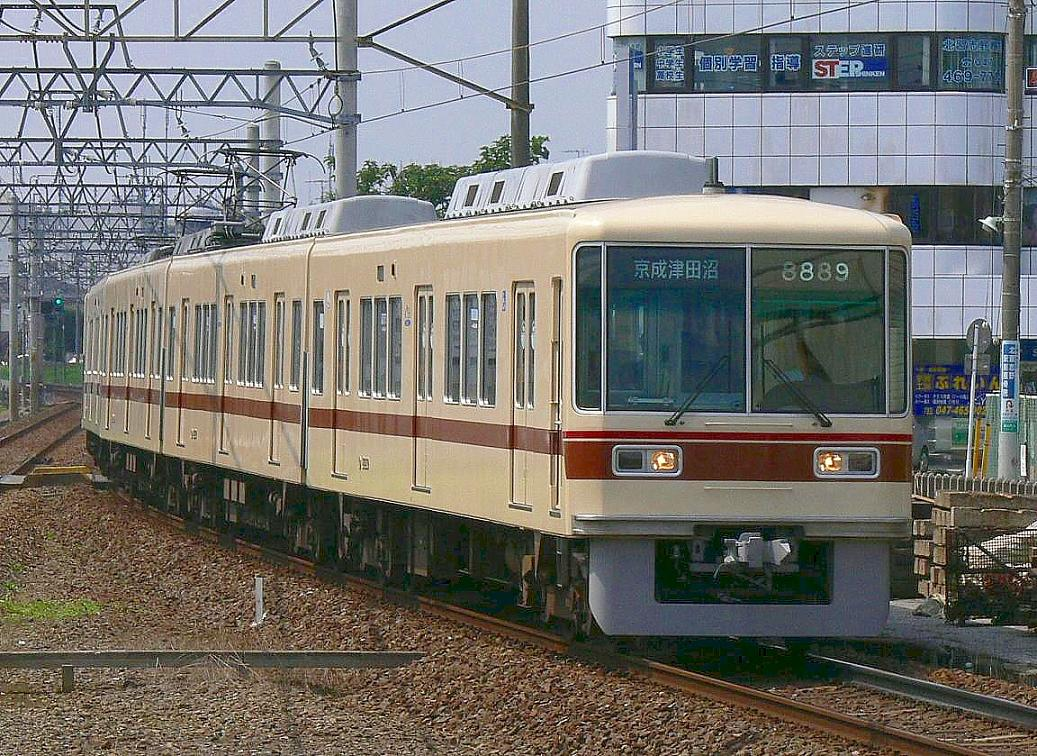
Original 8-car set 8889 in August 2006

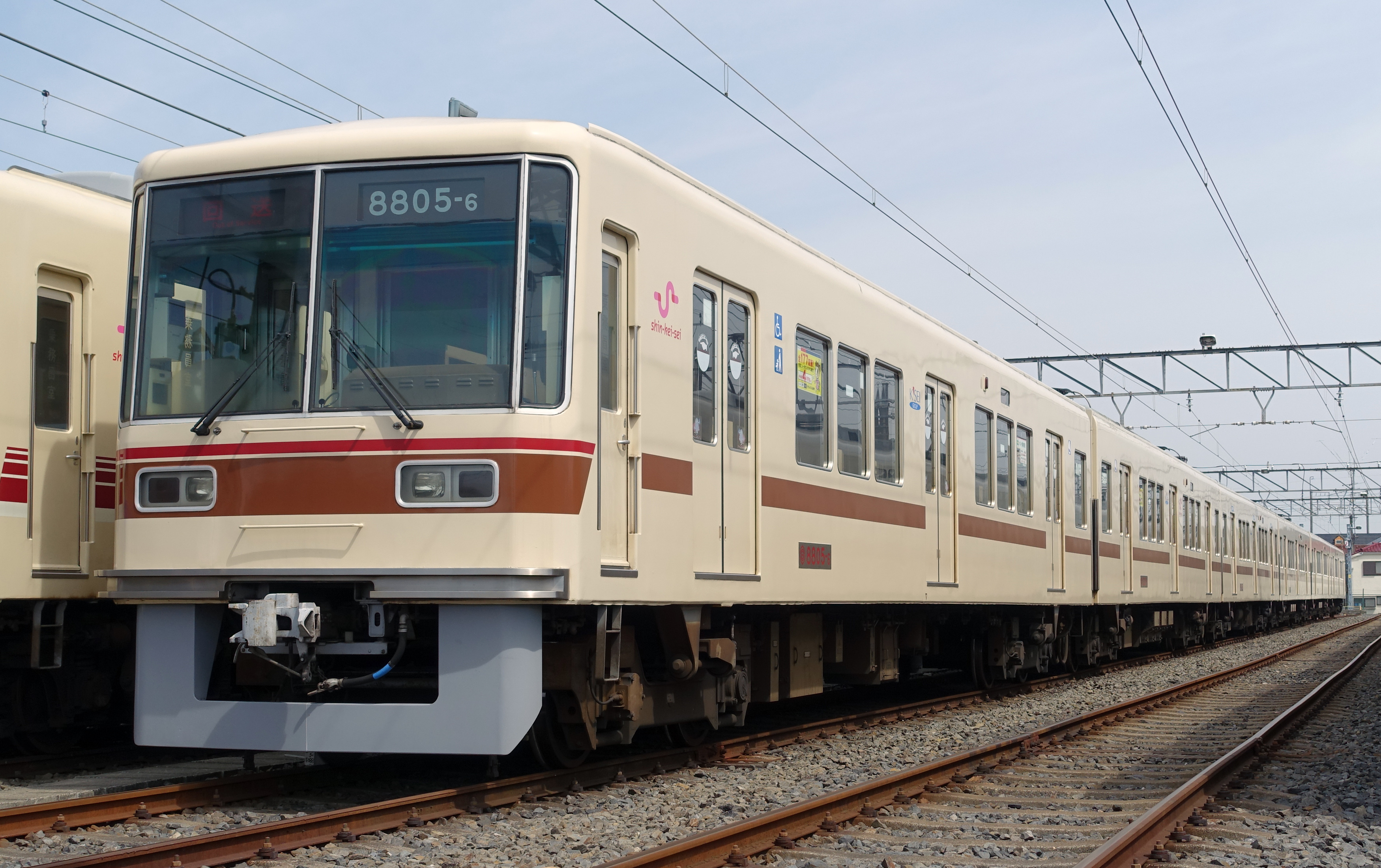
6-car set 8805 in original livery in April 2015

With Shin-Keisei's revised timetable on 10 December 2006, the 8800 series, alongside the 8000 and N800 series, began operation on Keisei Chiba Line through services. Three 8800 series sets (8801, 8841, and 8865) were rearranged to form four 6-car sets initially.

In 2013, sets 8806 and 8815 were experimentally equipped with LED headlights, but these were subsequently replaced by conventional lights. Set 8801 received LED headlights from June 2015.

=== Livery variations ===
The 8800 series originally carried a livery of beige with thin brown waistline striping. In 2006, coinciding with the introduction of Keisei Chiba Line through services, the 8800 series received a revised livery with thin maroon waistline stripes, reminiscent of the livery used with the N800 series.

The first set to receive Shin-Keisei's new pink corporate livery introduced in 2014 was 8816 in August 2014.

Following the fleet's transfer to Keisei Electric Railway, one set received the Keisei corporate livery in May 2025.

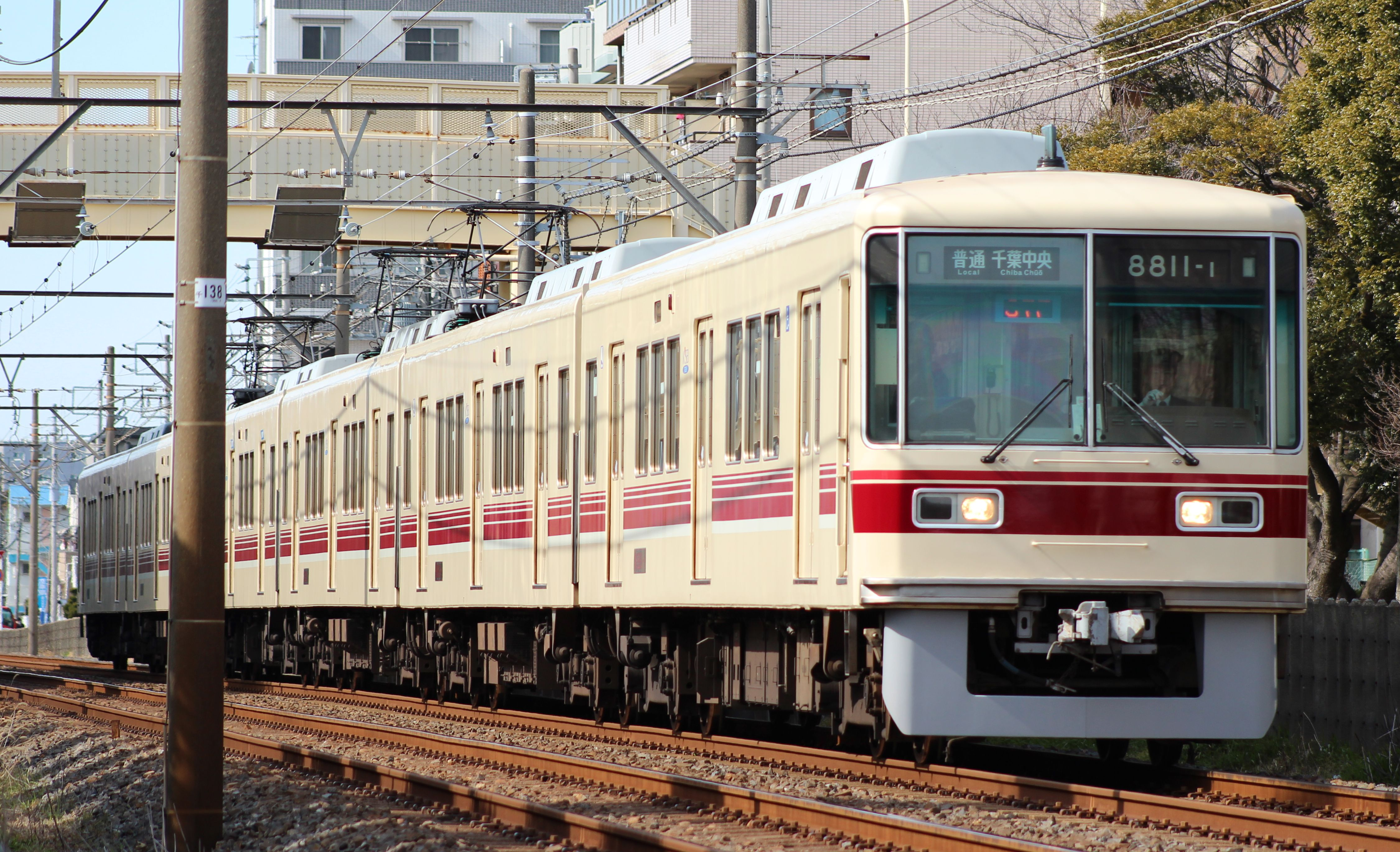
Set 8811 in February 2013 in revised livery with maroon stripes

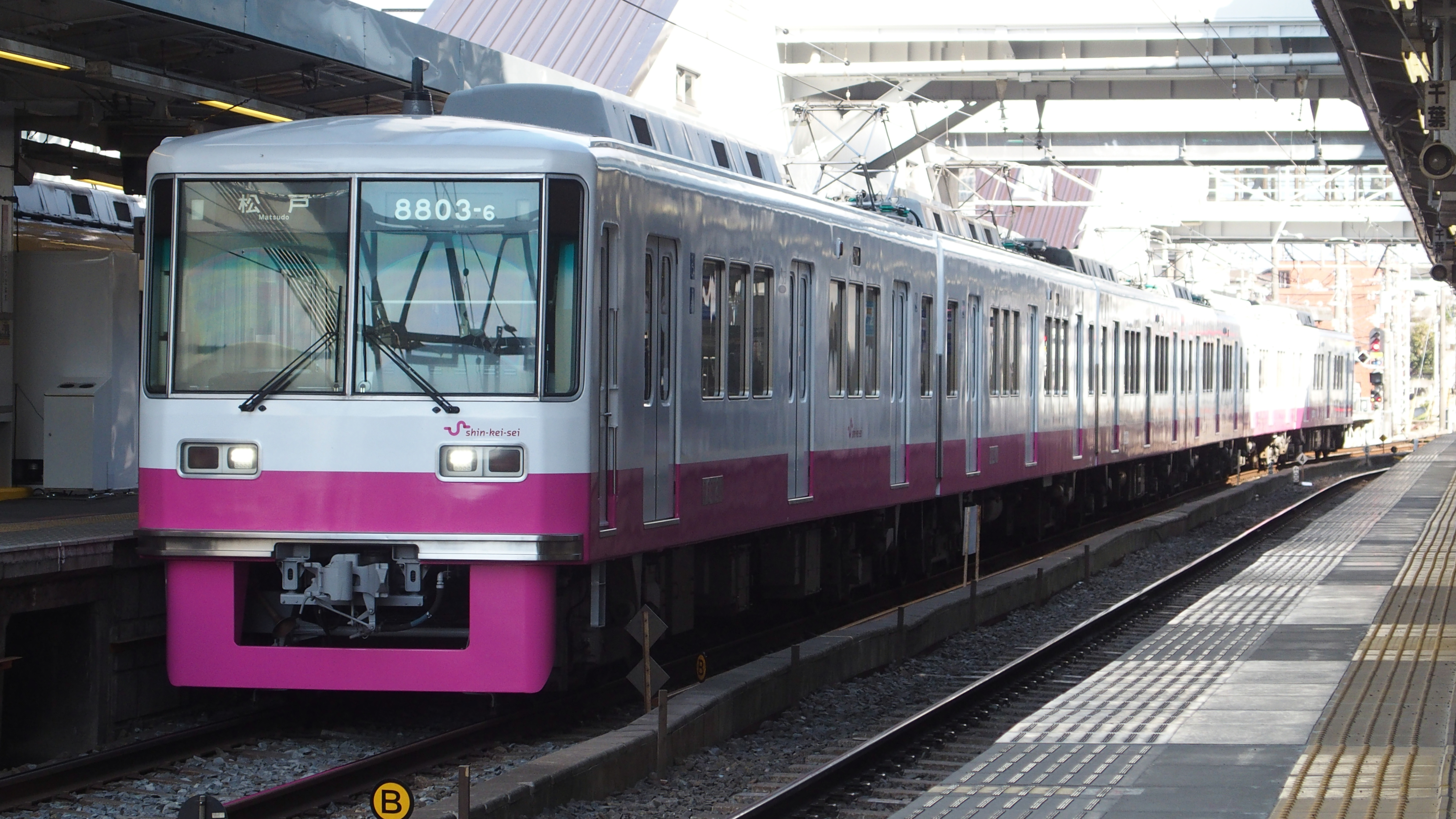
Set 8803 in Shin-Keisei pink corporate livery in March 2016

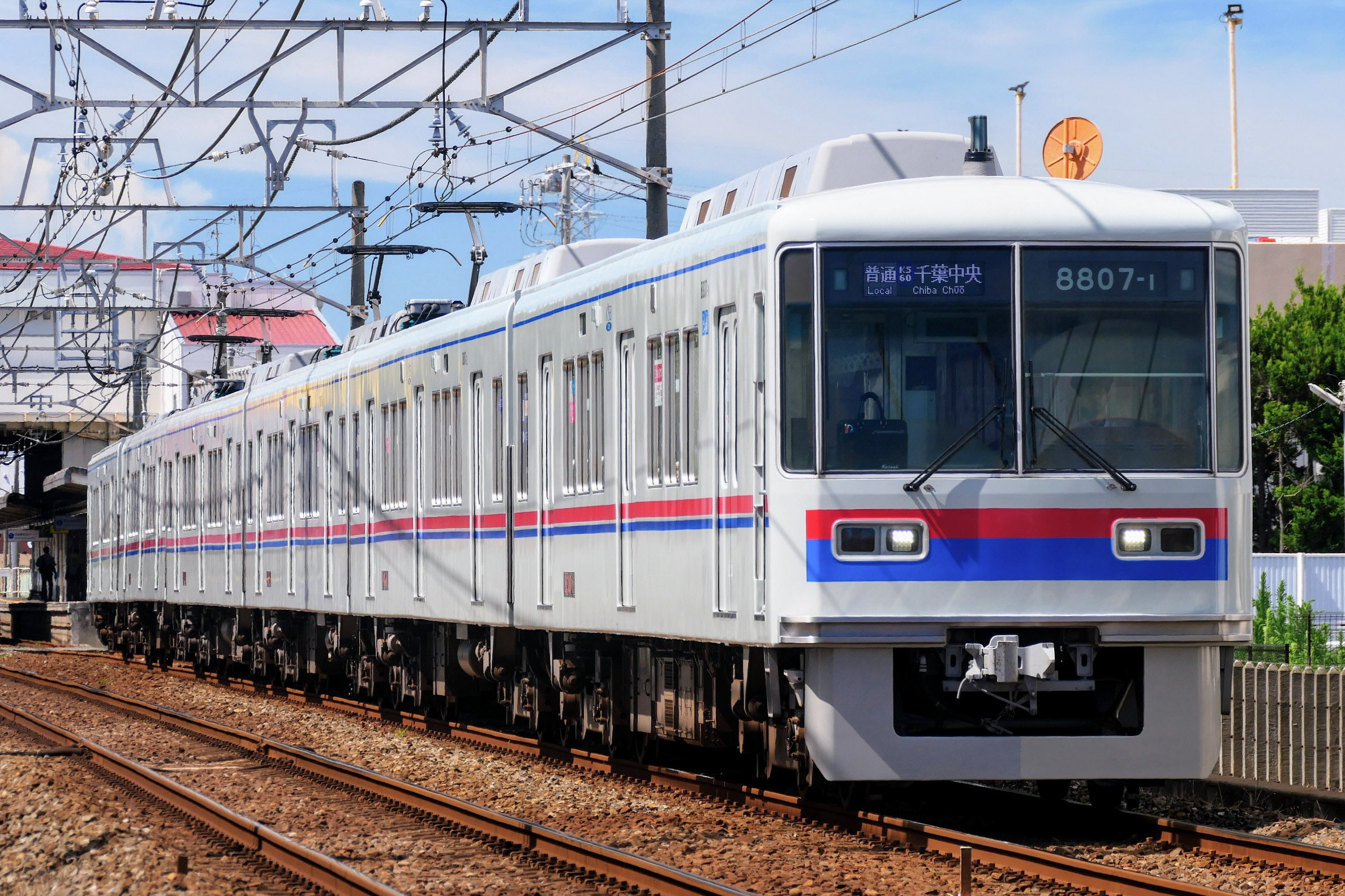
Set 8807 in Keisei livery in July 2025

=== Refurbishment ===
A programme of refurbishment of the fleet was started in 2017, with new interior panels, flooring and seat covers. One trainset is scheduled to be treated every year.

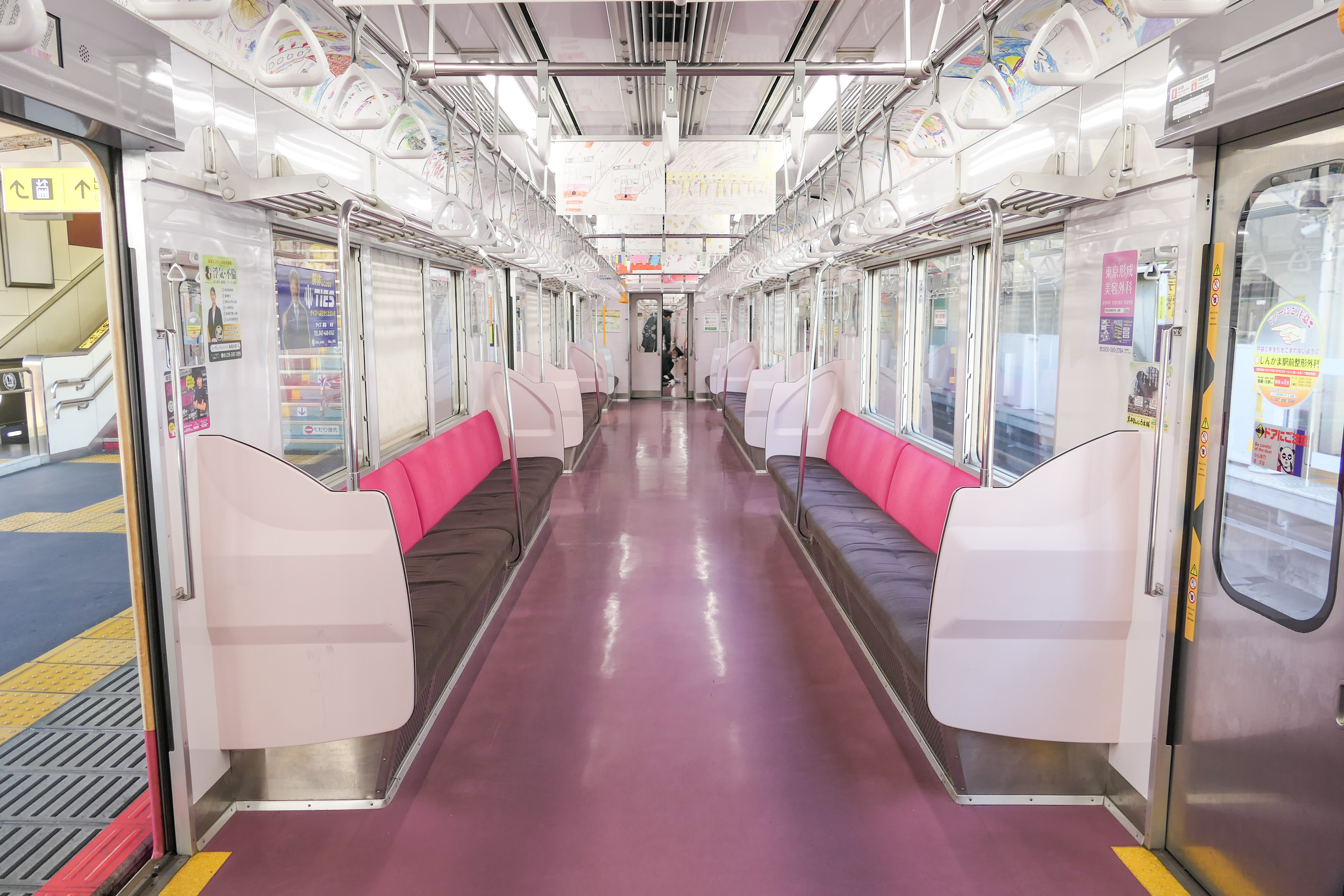
Refurbished interior

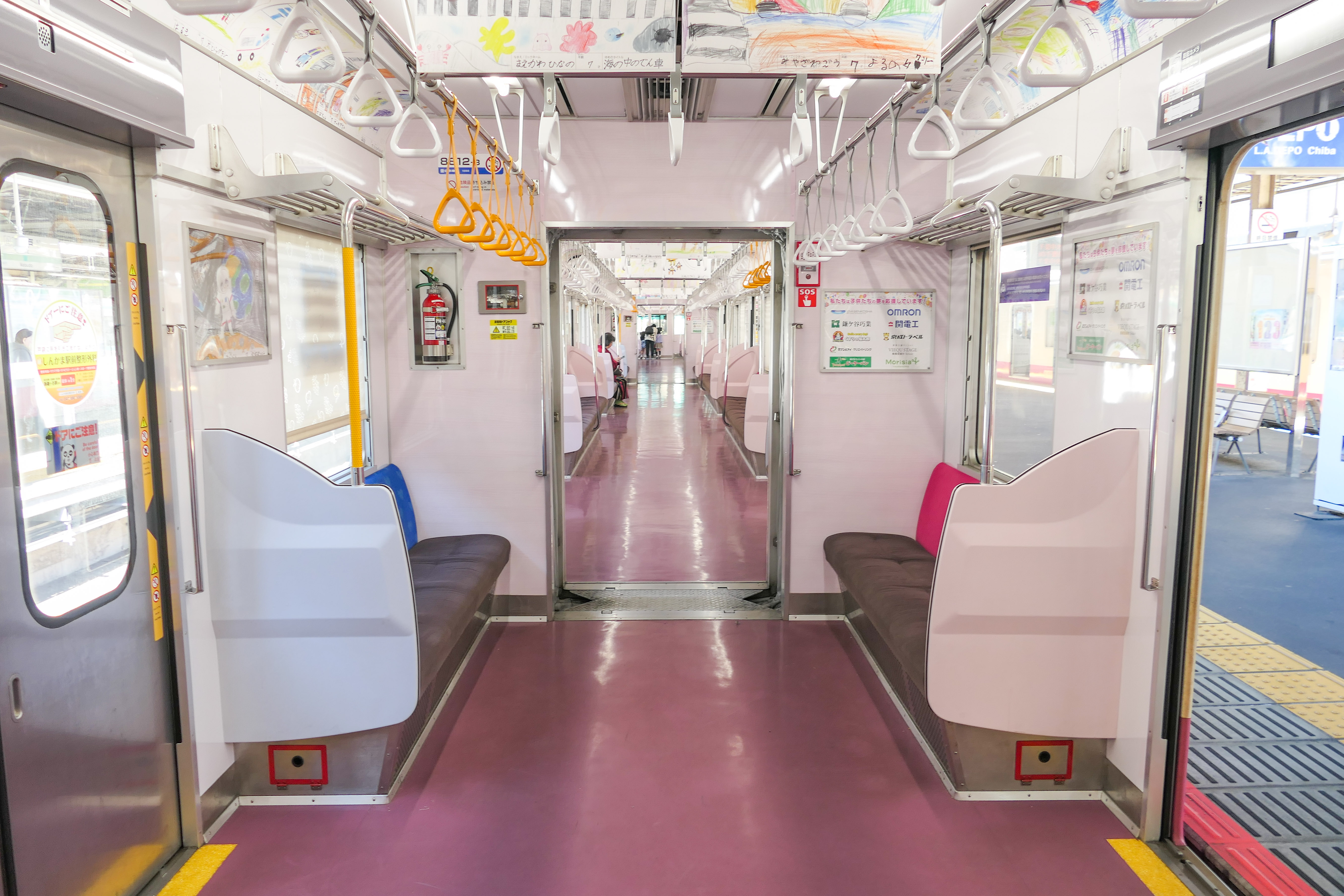
Refurbished interior (priority seating)

=== Retro Paint Train campaign ===
In July 2024, Shin-Keisei began operating various trains in former liveries, starting with N800 series set N838. 8800 series set 8808 returned to service with the Chiba Line through-service livery on 24 September 2024. On 18 November of that year, set 8813 returned to service in the fleet's original livery.
