= Takanekido Station =

Railway station in Funabashi, Chiba Prefecture, Japan

KS71 Takanekido Station 高根木戸駅
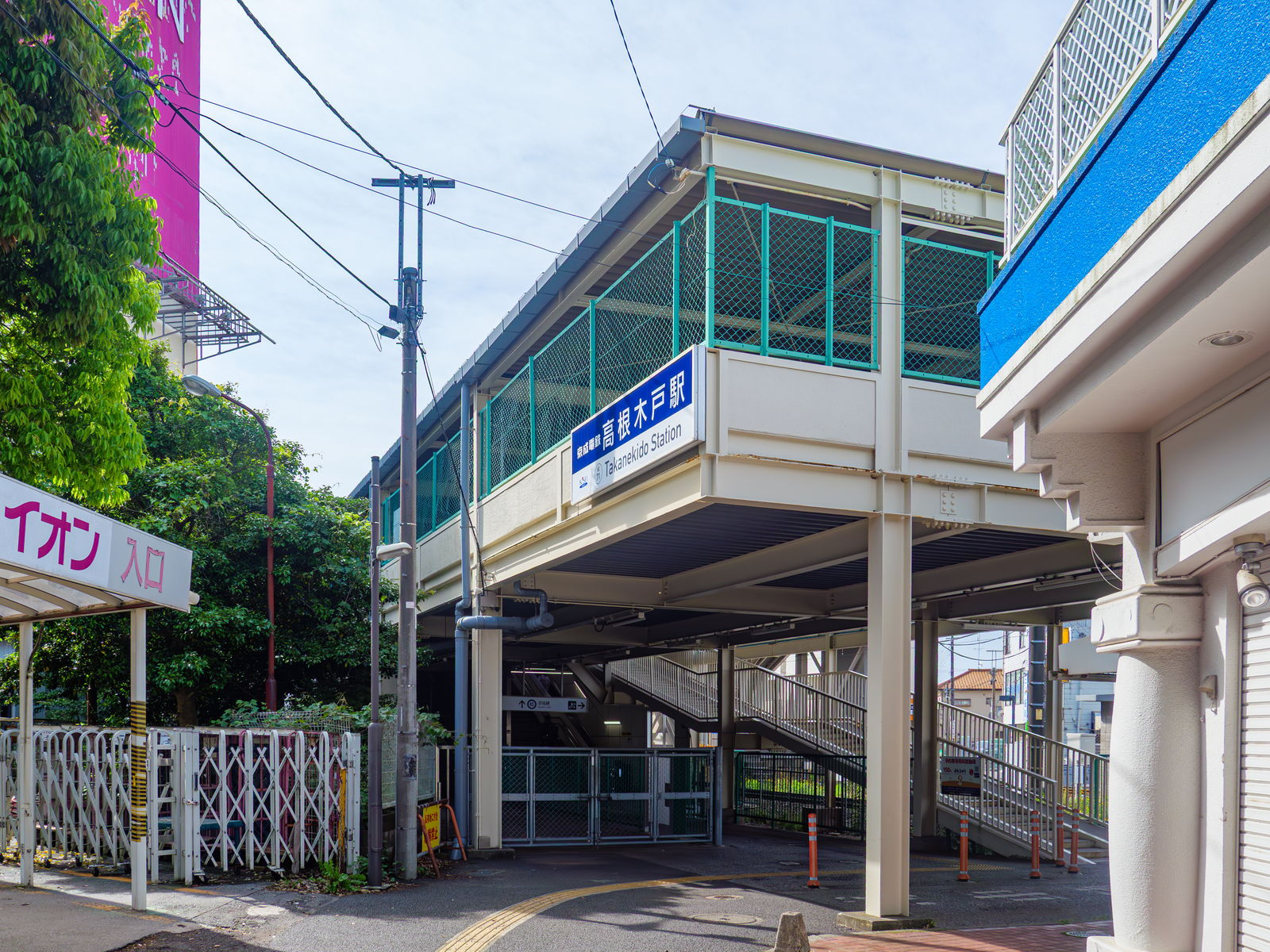
- Takanekido Station, May 2025

General information
- Location: 1-1-3 Narashinodai, Funabashi-shi, Chiba-ken 274-0063; Japan
- Coordinates: 35.7266°N 140.0348°E
- Operator: Keisei
- Line: Keisei Matsudo Line
- Distance: 20.1 km (12.5 mi) from Matsudo
- Platforms: 1 island platform
- Tracks: 2

Construction
- Structure type: At grade

Other information
- Station code: ○KS71
- Website: Official website

History
- Opened: 8 October 1948; 77 years ago

Passengers
- 2018: 8,509 daily

Services
Preceding station	Keisei	Following station
Takanekōdan KS72 towards Matsudo	Matsudo Line	Kita-Narashino KS70 towards Keisei Tsudanuma
Location
- Location within Chiba Prefecture Location within Japan

Takanekido Station (高根木戸駅, Takanekido-eki) is a passenger railway station located in the city of Funabashi, Chiba Prefecture, Japan, operated by the private railway operator Keisei Electric Railway.

== Lines ==
Takanekido Station is served by the Keisei Matsudo Line, and is located 20.1 kilometers from the terminus of the line at Matsudo Station.

== Station layout ==
The station consists of a single island platform, with an elevated station building.

=== Platforms ===
1	■ Keisei Matsudo Line	For Kita-Narashino, Shin-Tsudanuma, Keisei-Tsudanuma
2	■ Keisei Matsudo Line	For Shin-Kamagaya, Yabashira, Matsudo

== History ==
Takanekido Station was opened on 8 October 1948 on the Shin-Keisei Electric Railway.

Effective April 2025, the station came under the aegis of Keisei Electric Railway as the result of the buyout of the Shin-Keisei Railway. The move was completed on 1 April 2025.

== Passenger statistics ==
In fiscal 2018, the station was used by an average of 8,509 passengers daily.

== Surrounding area ==
- The station is located right next to the Æon market.

== See also ==
- List of railway stations in Japan
