= Shin-Keisei 8900 series =

Japanese train type

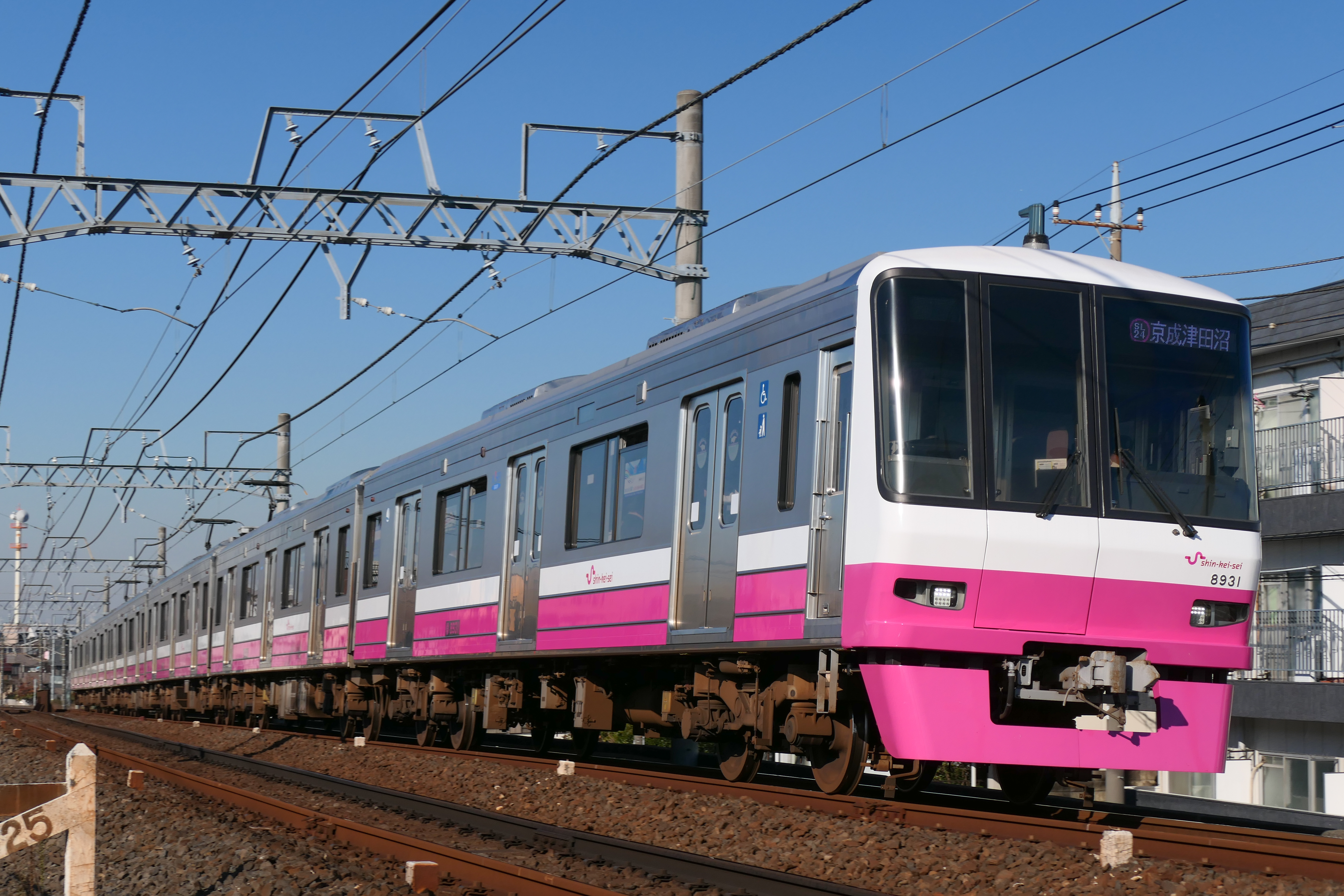
- Set 8931 in final Shin-Keisei livery, December 2021
- In service: 1993–present
- Manufacturer: Nippon Sharyo
- Constructed: 1993–1996
- Entered service: 26 September 1993
- Number built: 24 vehicles (3 sets)
- Number in service: 18 vehicles (3 sets)
- Number scrapped: 6 vehicles (cars 4 & 5 of a train set)
- Formation: 6 cars per set
- Operator: Keisei
- Depot: Kunugiyama
- Line served: Keisei Matsudo Line

Specifications
- Car body construction: Stainless steel
- Car length: 18,200 mm (59 ft 9 in) (end cars); 17,500 mm (57 ft 5 in) (end cars)
- Width: 2,780 mm (9 ft 1 in)
- Doors: 3 pairs per side
- Maximum speed: 120 km/h (75 mph)
- Electric system: 1,500 V DC overhead wire
- Current collection: Pantograph
- Bogies: SS-034 (motored), SS-134 (trailer)
- Track gauge: 1,435 mm (4 ft 8 1/2 in)

The Shin-Keisei 8900 series (新京成8900形) is an electric multiple unit (EMU) train type operated by the private railway operator Keisei Electric Railway. The type was introduced by the Shin-Keisei Electric Railway on the Shin-Keisei Line in Chiba Prefecture, Japan, in September 1993.

== Formations ==
As of 1 April 2014, the fleet consists of three eight-car sets based at Kunugiyama Depot with four motored (M) cars and four trailer (T) cars, formed as shown below, with the Tc1 car at the Tsudanuma end.

Designation	Tc1	M1	M2	T2	T1	M1	M2	Tc2
Numbering	89x1	89x2	89x3	89x4	89x5	89x6	89x7	89x8
Capacity (total/seated)	122/42	127/48	127/48	127/48	127/48	127/48	127/48	122/42

- The M2 cars are each fitted with two single-arm-type pantographs.
- The T1 cars are designated as having mild air-conditioning.

== History ==
The sets were built by Nippon Sharyo in Aichi Prefecture, with the first set entering service on 26 September 1993. The second set entered service on 29 February 1996, and the third set entered service on 25 June 1996.

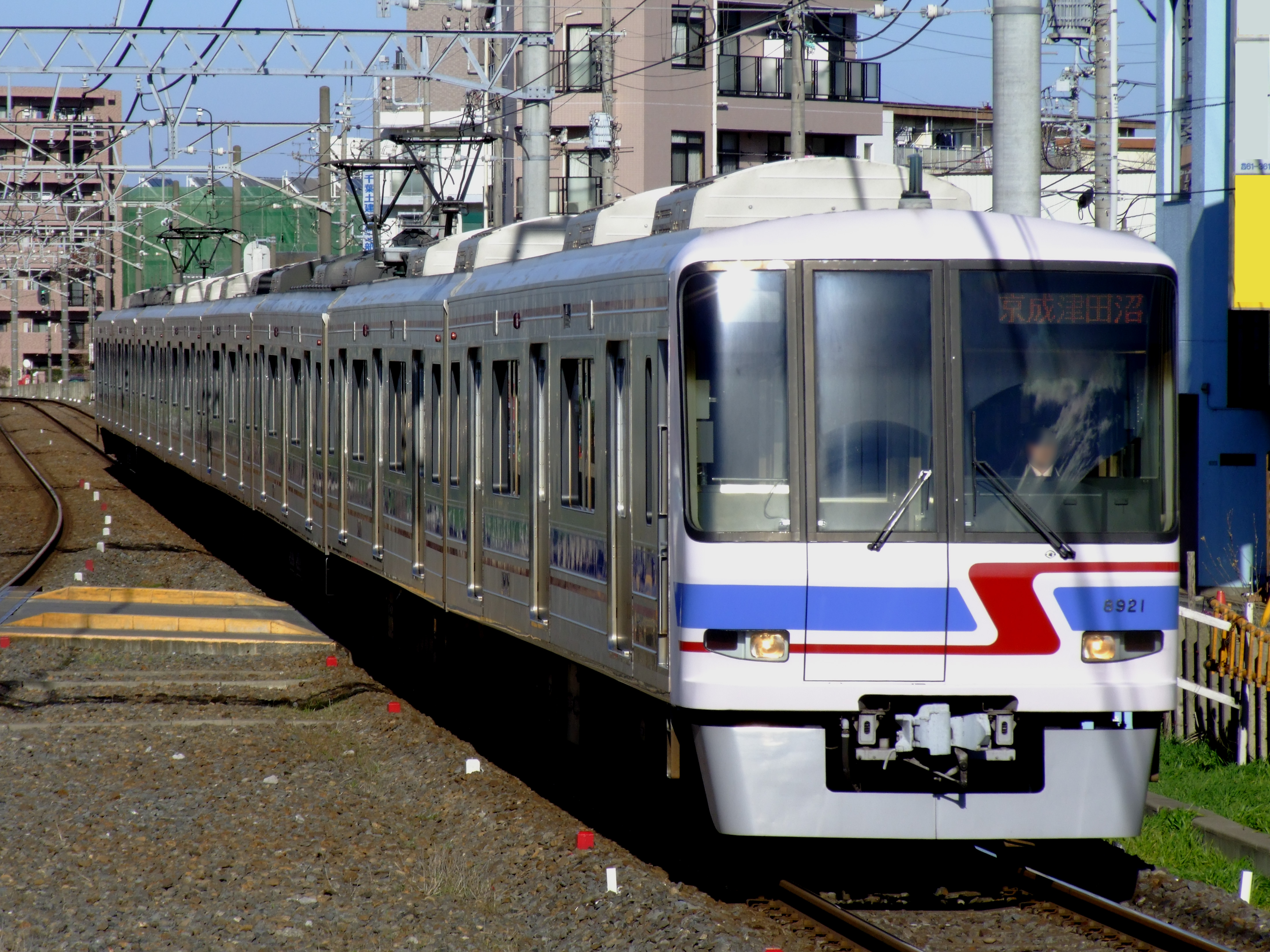
Set 8921 in February 2007 as an 8-car set in the original livery

In 2014, set 8911 was reduced to six cars and repainted in the new pink corporate colour scheme. Set 8921 followed as such in September that year. By 30 September, all three sets were shortened to six cars and repainted the new livery, with the 2 middle cars (car 4 & 5) being scrapped.

=== Transfer to Keisei ===
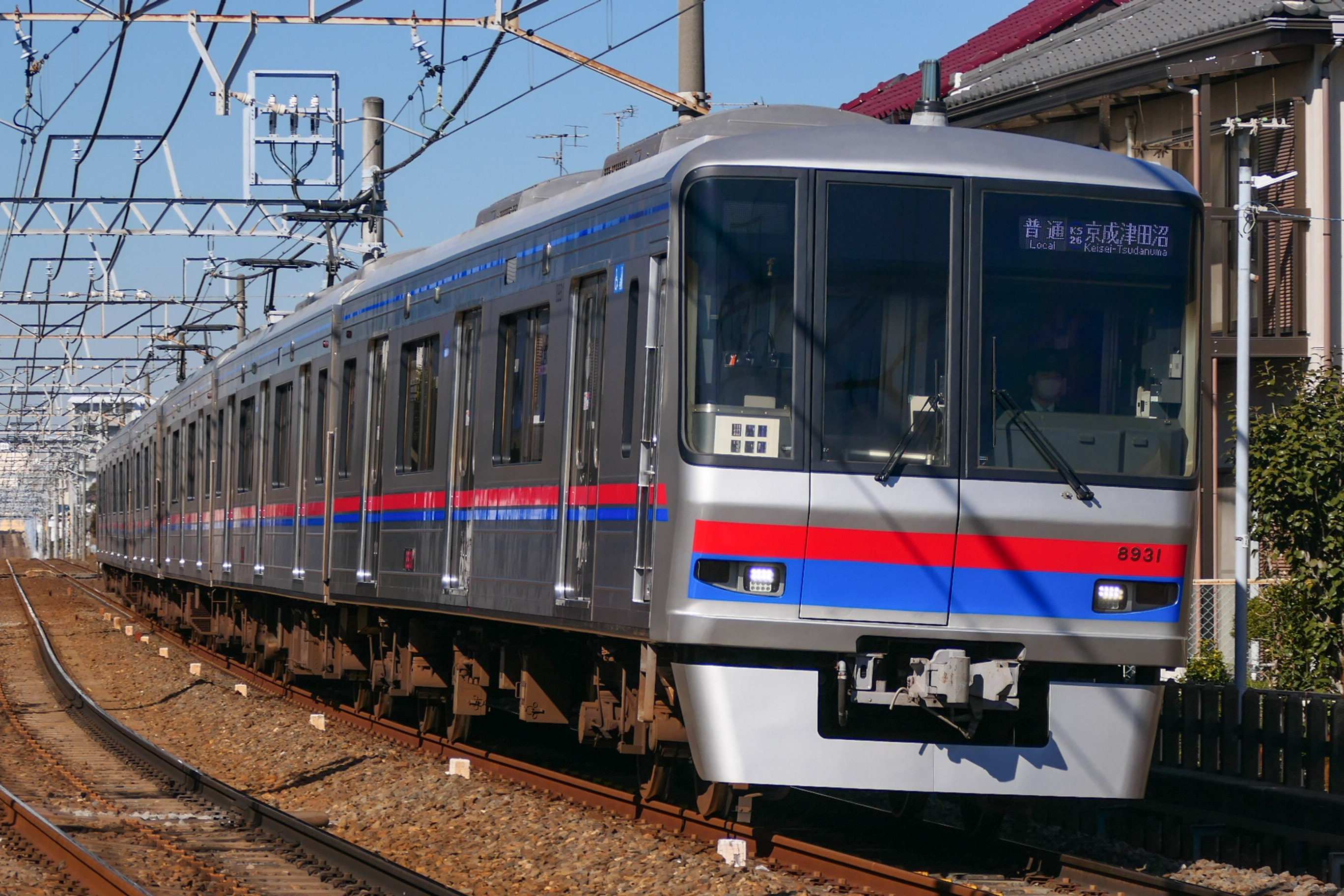
Set 8931 in Keisei livery, February 2026

On 1 April 2025, all sets were transferred to Keisei following its acquisition of the Shin-Keisei Electric Railway. The first set to receive the standard Keisei livery was set 8931, unveiled on 24 December of that year.
