= Takifudō Station =

Railway station in Funabashi, Chiba Prefecture, Japan

KS73 Takifudō Station 滝不動駅
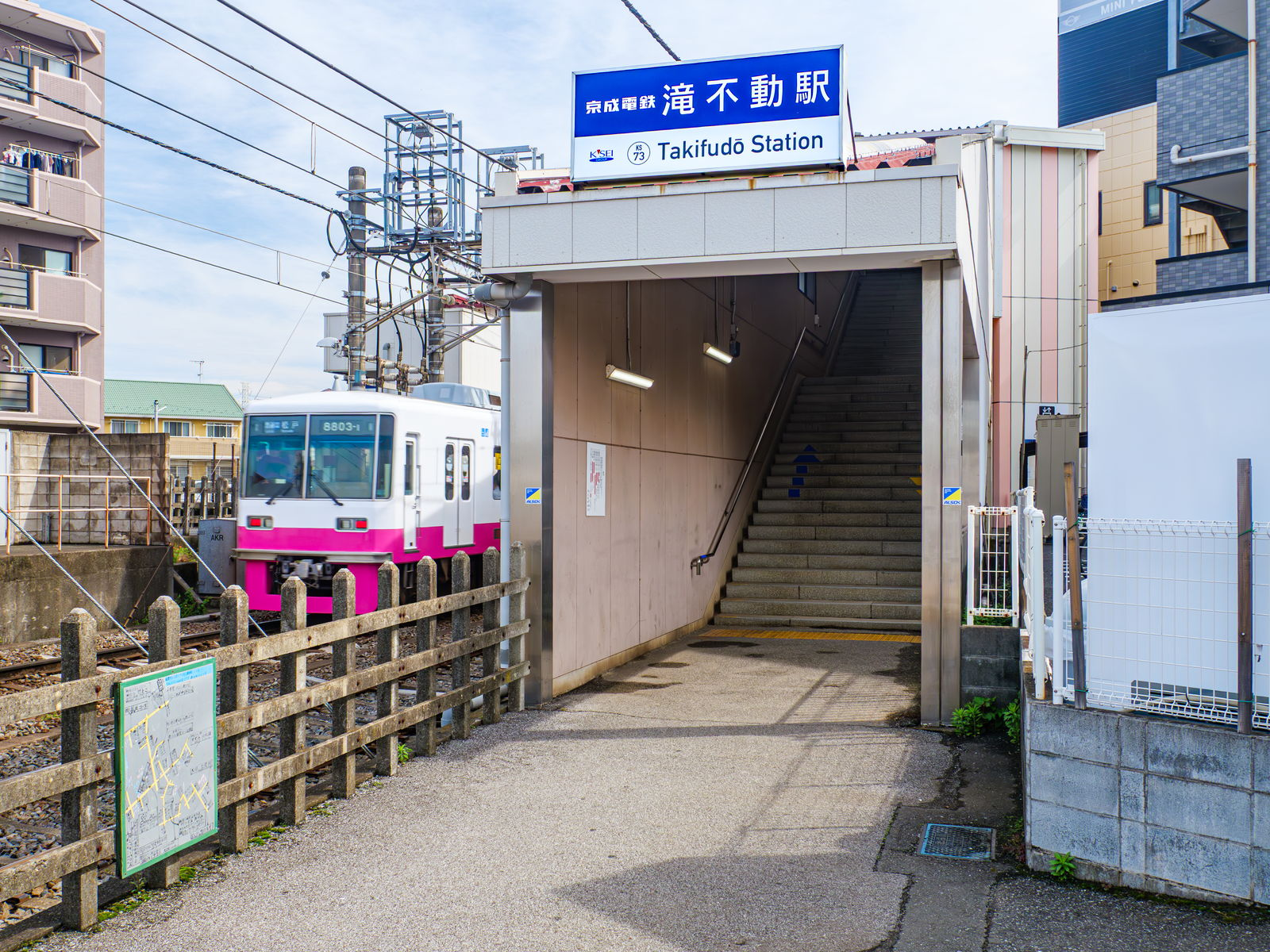
- Takifudō Station

General information
- Location: 3-23-1 Minamimisaki, Funabashi-shi, Chiba-ken 274-0813; Japan
- Coordinates: 35.7380°N 140.0264°E
- Operator: Keisei Electric Railway
- Line: Keisei Matsudo Line
- Distance: 18.5 km (11.5 mi) from Matsudo
- Platforms: 2 side platforms
- Tracks: 2

Construction
- Structure type: At grade

Other information
- Station code: ○KS73
- Website: Official website

History
- Opened: 26 August 1948; 78 years ago

Passengers
- FY 2018: 7,593 daily

Services
Preceding station	Keisei	Following station
Misaki KS74 towards Matsudo	Matsudo Line	Takanekōdan KS72 towards Keisei Tsudanuma
Location
- Location within Chiba Prefecture Location within Japan

Takifudō Station (滝不動駅, Takifudō-eki) is a passenger railway station located in the city of Funabashi, Chiba Prefecture, Japan, operated by the private railway operator Keisei Electric Railway.

== Lines ==
Takifudō Station is served by the Keisei Matsudo Line, and is located 18.5 kilometers from the terminus of the line at Matsudo Station.

== Station layout ==
The station consists of two opposed side platforms, with an elevated station building.

=== Platforms ===
1	■ Keisei Matsudo Line	For Kita-Narashino, Shin-Tsudanuma, Keisei-Tsudanuma
2	■ Keisei Matsudo Line	For Shin-Kamagaya, Yabashira, Matsudo

== History ==
Takifudō Station was opened on 26 August 1948 on the Shin-Keisei Electric Railway.

Effective April 2025, the station came under the aegis of Keisei Electric Railway as the result of the buyout of the Shin-Keisei Railway. The move was completed on 1 April 2025.

== Passenger statistics ==
In fiscal 2018, the station was used by an average of 7,593 passengers daily.

== Surrounding area ==
- Funabashi Municipal Otaki Junior High School
- Funabashi Municipal Futawa Elementary School
- Funabashi City Kanasugidai Elementary School

== See also ==
- List of railway stations in Japan
