= Shin-Keisei 80000 series =

Japanese train type

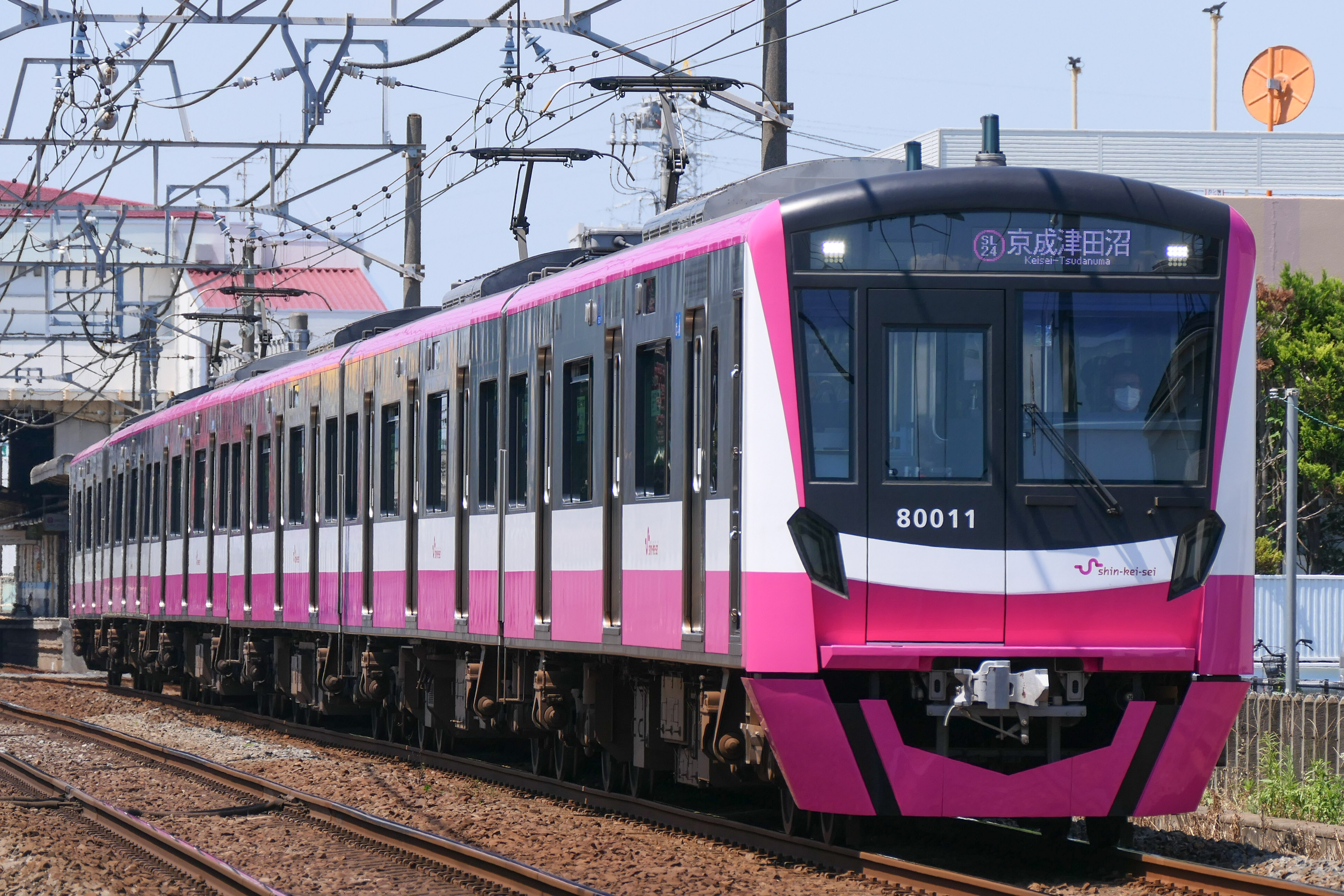
- Shin-Keisei 80000 series near Misaki Station in June 2021
- Manufacturer: Nippon Sharyo
- Replaced: 8000 series
- Constructed: 2019–Present
- Entered service: 27 December 2019
- Number built: 30 vehicles (5 sets)
- Number in service: 30 vehicles (5 sets)
- Formation: 6 cars per set
- Fleet numbers: 80016 – 80056
- Capacity: End car: 122 (43 seated); Intermediate car: 133 (49 seated)
- Operator: Keisei
- Lines served: Matsudo Line; Chiba Line

Specifications
- Doors: 3 pairs per side
- Maximum speed: 120 km/h (75 mph) (design); 85 km/h (53 mph) (on Shin-Keisei Line)
- Traction system: Mitsubishi MAP-168-15V331 SiC-MOSFET–VVVF
- Traction motors: Mitsubishi MB-5160-D 155 kW (208 hp) 3-phase AC induction motor
- Acceleration: 3.5 km/(h⋅s) (2.2 mph/s)
- Deceleration: 4.0 km/(h⋅s) (2.5 mph/s) (service); 4.5 km/(h⋅s) (2.8 mph/s) (emergency)
- Electric systems: 1,500 V DC overhead catenary
- Current collection: Pantograph
- UIC classification: Bo'Bo' + Bo'Bo' + 2'2' + 2'2' + Bo'Bo' + Bo'Bo'
- Bogies: FS-583S
- Track gauge: 1,435 mm (4 ft 8 1/2 in)

The Shin-Keisei 80000 series (新京成80000形) is an electric multiple unit (EMU) train type operated by the private railway operator Keisei Electric Railway since April 2025. The type initially began operations on the Shin-Keisei Line in December 2019. It shares a common design with the Keisei 3100 series.

== Design ==
The trains were jointly designed with Keisei Electric Railway and feature Shin-Keisei's "gentle pink" corporate design.

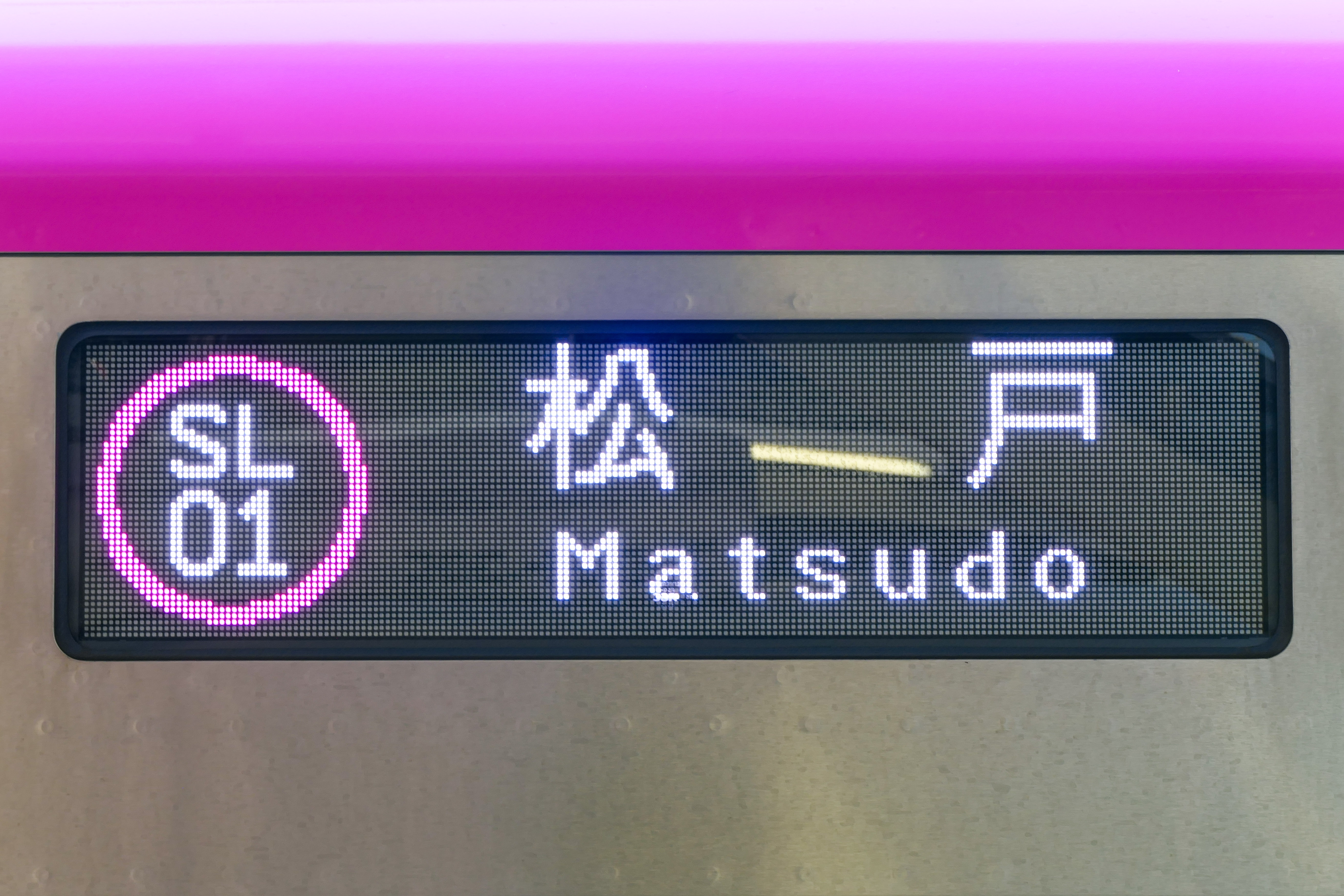
External LED destination display

== Formations ==
The 80000 series is formed as follows, with four motored cars and two trailer cars per set.

| Car No. | 1 | 2 | 3 | 4 | 5 | 6 |
|---|---|---|---|---|---|---|
| Designation | Moha 80001 (Mc1) | Moha 80002 (M2) | Saha 80003 (T3) | Saha 80004 (T4) | Moha 80005 (M5) | Moha 80006 (Mc6) |
| Capacity (total/seated) | 122/43 | 133/49 | 133/49 | 133/49 | 133/49 | 122/43 |
| Numbering | 80011; 80021 | 80012; 80022 | 80013; 80022 | 80014; 80024 | 80015; 80025 | 80016; 80026 |

== Technical specifications ==
The trains use SiC–VVVF inverters which control 3-phase AC motors. The motor inverters used on the 80000 series offer a 19% reduction in power consumption over the IGBT–VVVF inverters used on the N800 series.

== Interior ==
Seating accommodation consists of longitudinal seating throughout, providing a seating capacity of 43 in the end cars and 49 in the intermediate cars. A wheelchair space is provided near the crew compartment of the first car, and intermediate cars feature a free space for wheelchairs and strollers.

The seats are of a high-back design; their backs are 175 mm (6.9 in) higher than those of the N800 series. They are also thickened for improved passenger comfort. The seat partitions and vestibules are made of tempered glass to create a sense of openness. Unlike the Keisei 3100 series's seats, those of the 80000 series do not feature a foldable portion for storing luggage.

The interior also includes 17-inch passenger information displays, security cameras, and ceiling-mounted Plasmacluster ion generators.

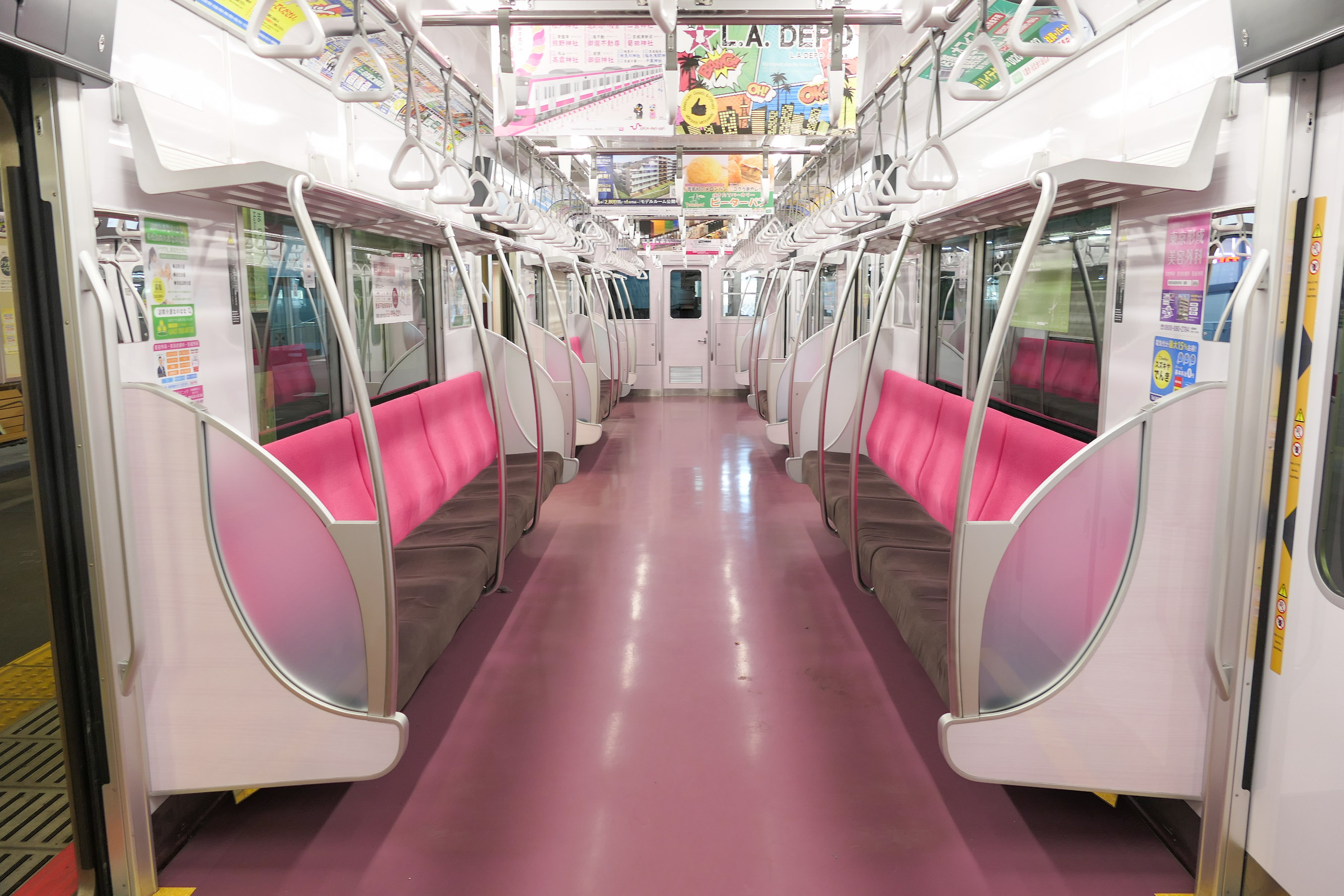
Interior view

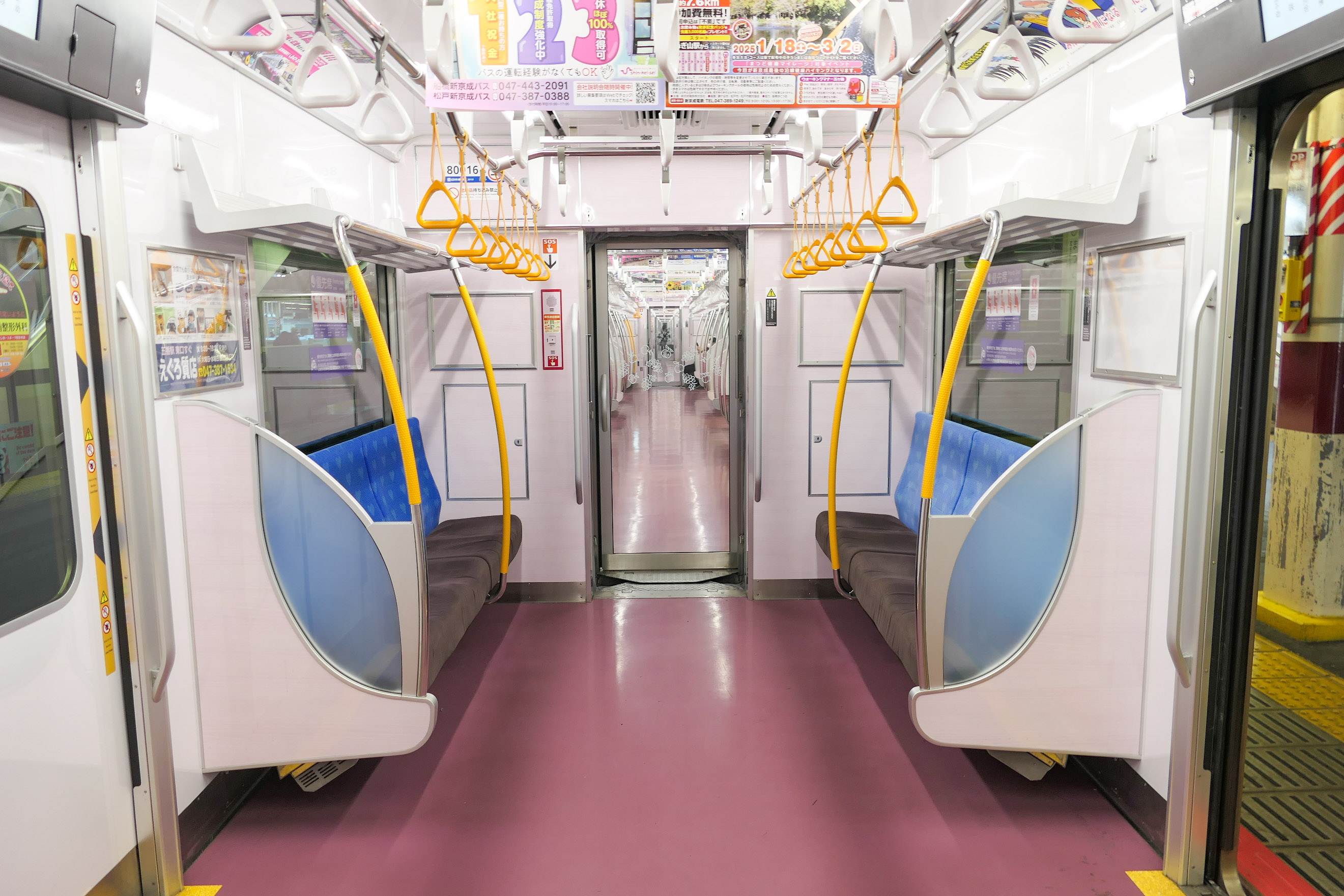
Priority seating

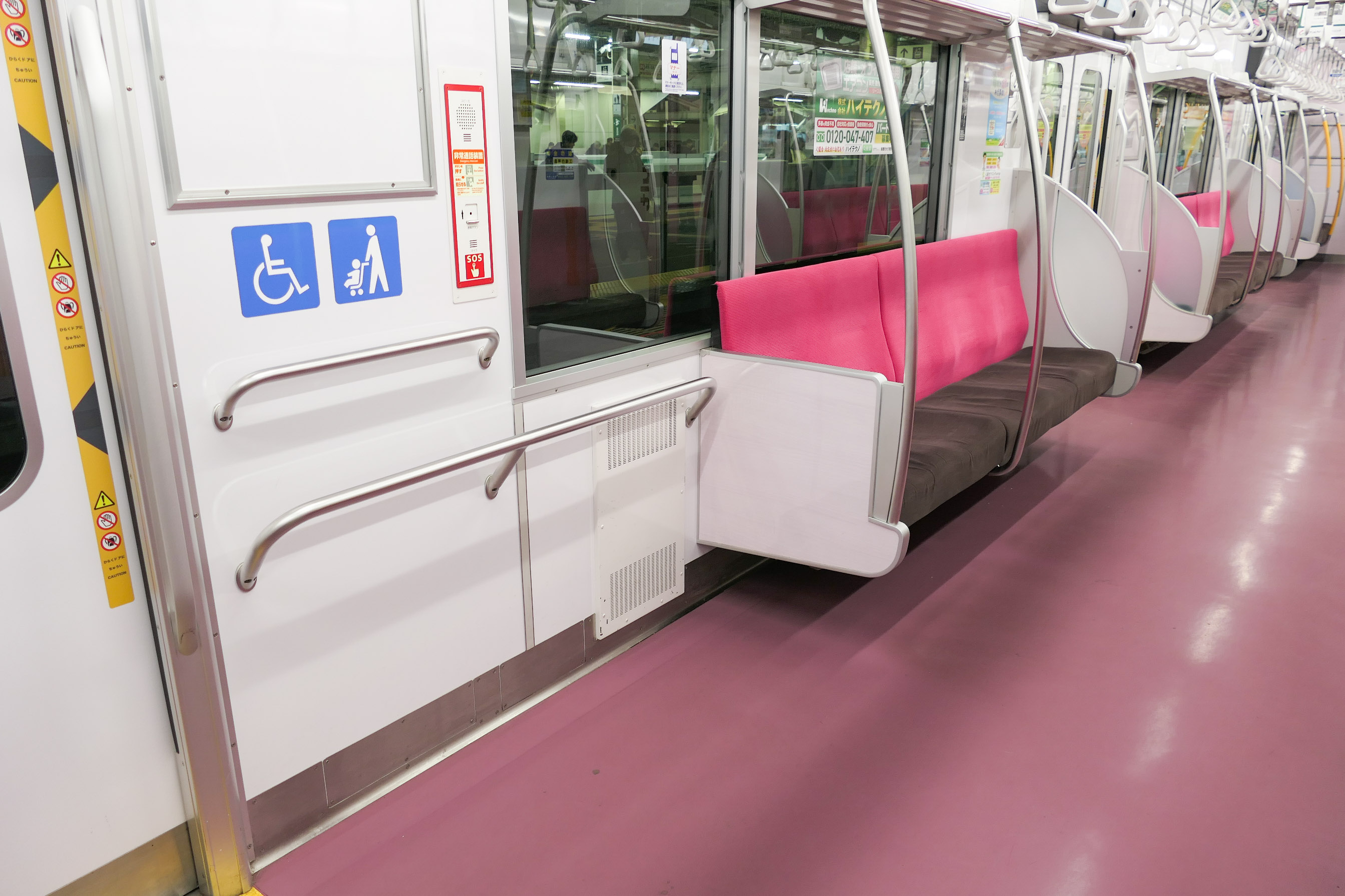
Wheelchair space

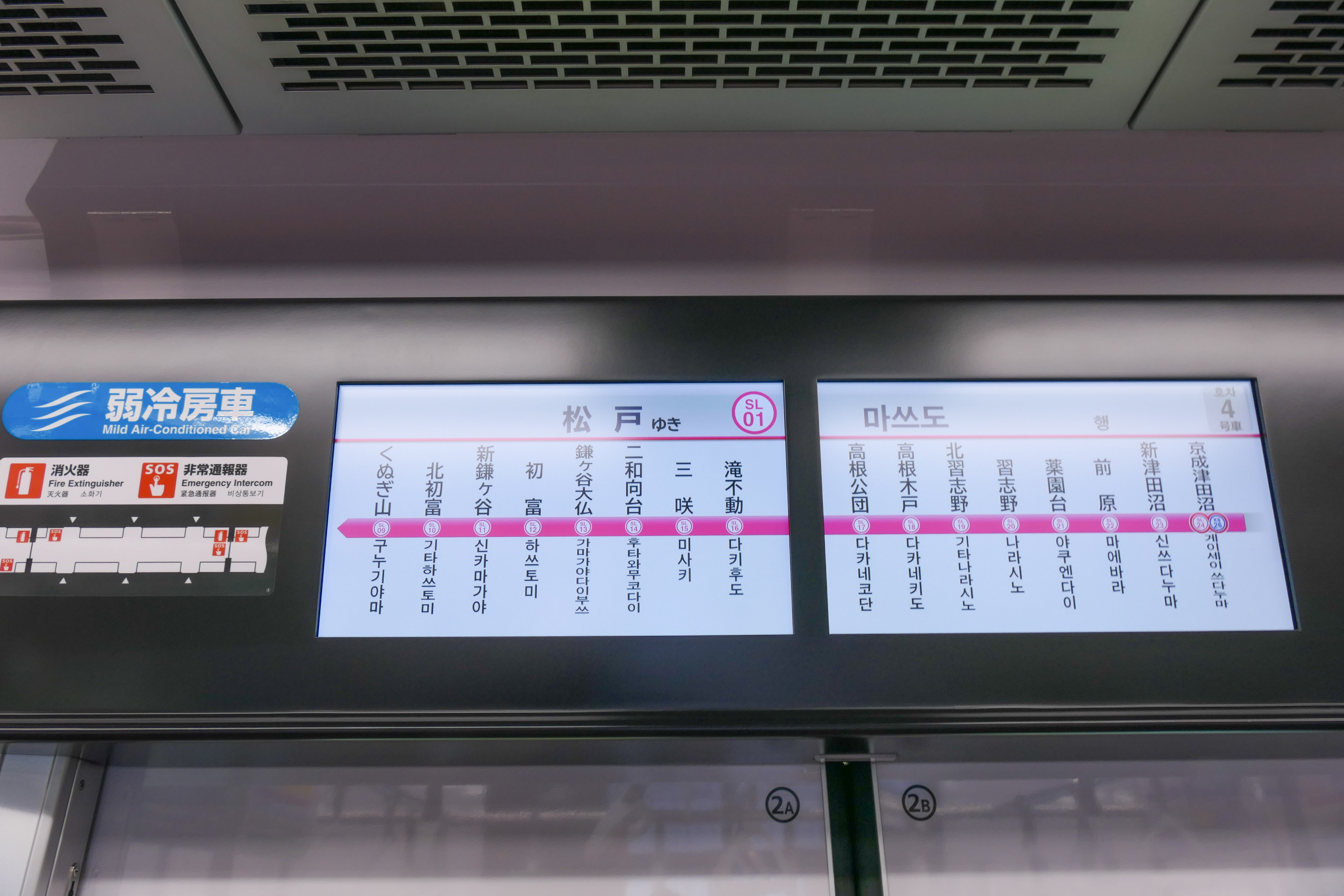
LCD passenger information displays

== History ==
In April 2019, Shin-Keisei announced its plans to introduce a new six-car train in Winter 2019.

Delivery from the Nippon Sharyo plant in Toyokawa began in October 2019.

A public trial run was to be held on 21 December 2019, and the first unit entered service on 27 December. A second set was built in October 2021 to replace 8000 series set 8512, and as of April 2024, five 80000 series sets have been introduced into service.

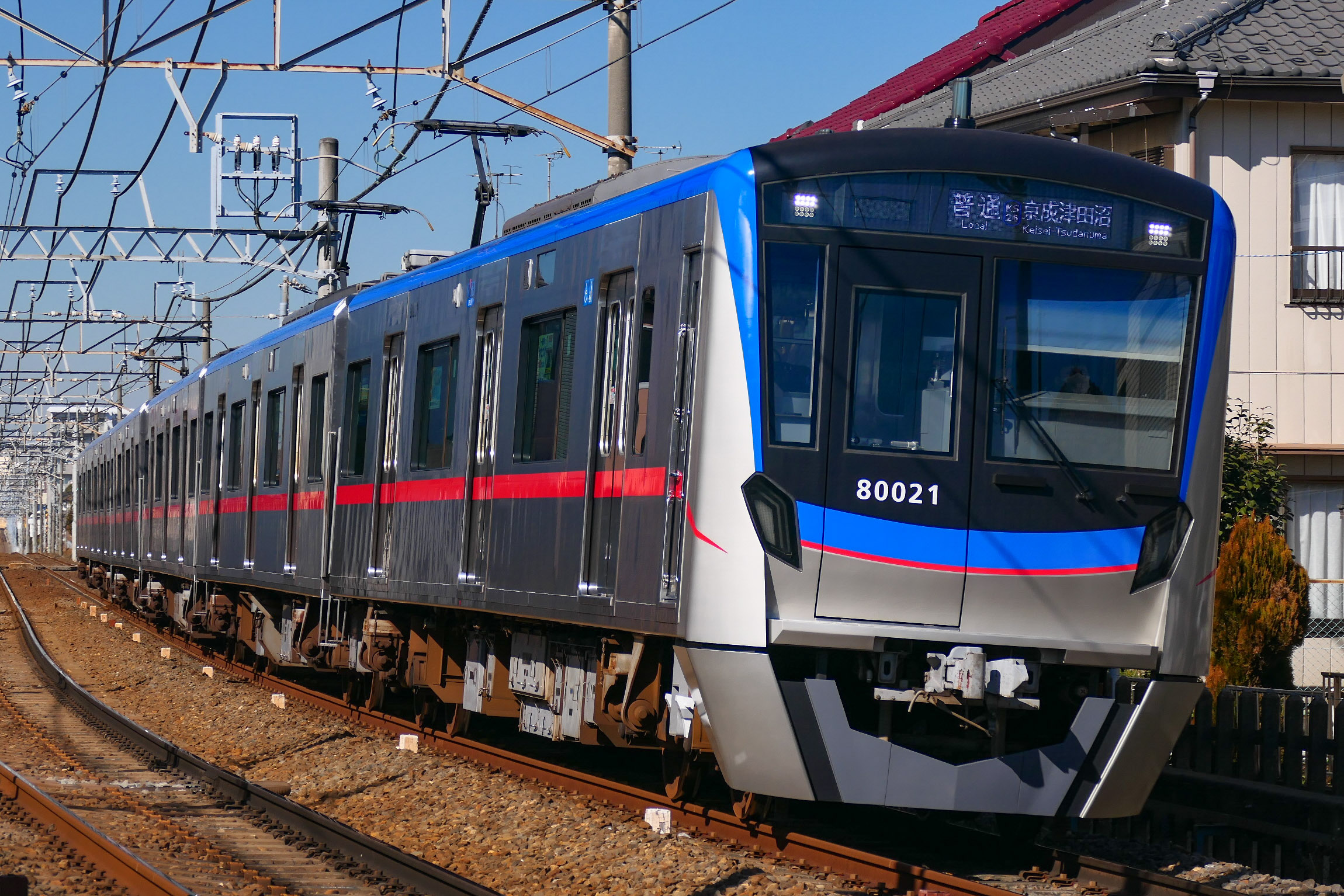
Set 80021 in Keisei livery in February 2026

On 1 April 2025, all sets were transferred to Keisei following its acquisition of the Shin-Keisei Electric Railway. The fleet was introduced on Chiba Line services on 21 December 2025. Repainting of the sets into the Keisei corporate livery was completed in February 2026.
