= Keisei Matsudo Line =

Railway line in Chiba Prefecture, Japan

Matsudo Line

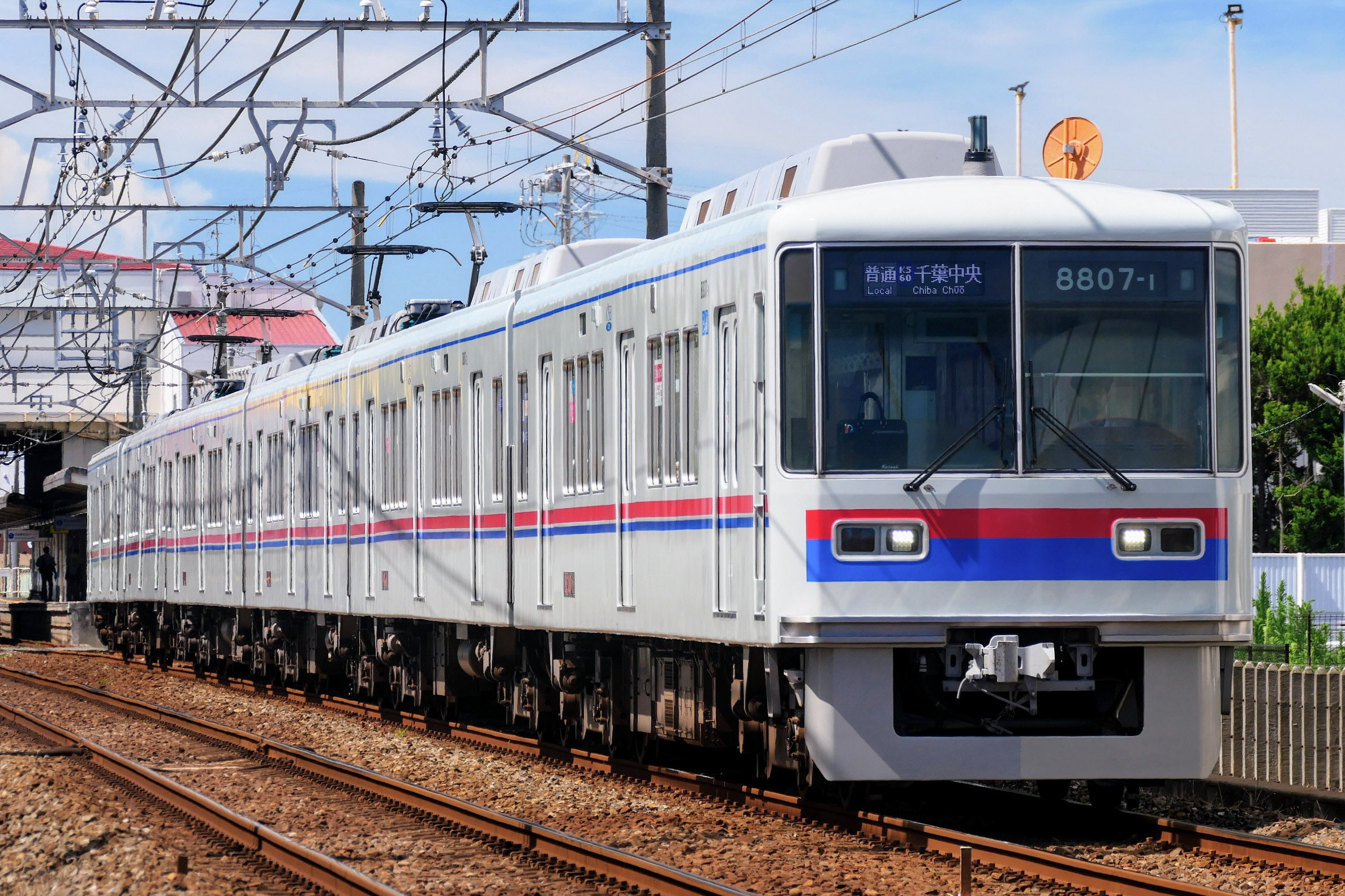
- 8800 series in July 2025

Overview
- Native name: 松戸線
- Locale: Chiba Prefecture, Japan
- Termini: Matsudo; Keisei Tsudanuma
- Stations: 24

Service
- Type: Commuter rail
- Operator: Keisei Electric Railway
- Depot(s): Kunugiyama, Tsudanuma
- Rolling stock: 8800 series; 8900 series; N800 series; 80000 series

History
- Opened: December 27, 1947; 78 years ago

Technical
- Line length: 26.5 km (16.5 mi)
- Track gauge: 1,435 mm (4 ft 8 1/2 in)
- Electrification: 1,500 V DC overhead catenary
- Operating speed: 85 km/h (55 mph)
Route map

The Matsudo Line (松戸線, Matsudo-sen) is a railway line in Japan owned and operated by Keisei Electric Railway. The line runs between Matsudo Station in Matsudo, Chiba, and Keisei-Tsudanuma Station in Narashino, Chiba.

The line was known as the Shin-Keisei Line from December 1947 until April 2025, when it was operated by the Shin-Keisei Electric Railway. Shin-Keisei and Keisei merged in April 2025.

== History ==
Most of the line overlaps with a railway line opened on an unknown date by the Imperial Japanese Army Railways and Shipping Section used to connect military facilities. The line had numerous sharp curves to train the drivers, which also led to the Matsudo line sharing a similar trait. Although the rail profile of the line was sold to the Seibu Railway after the section disbanded following Japanese capitulation, the track bed remained in place. Seibu Railway and the Keisei Electric Railway, which both had hired former Railways and Shipping Section personnel, competed to gain approval from the Supreme Commander for the Allied Powers (GHQ) to construct a railway line using the track bed. The latter gained approval in March 1946 as they had their base of operation in Chiba prefecture. The Shin-Keisei Electric Railway was established on 23 October 1946 as a subsidiary of the Keisei Electric Railway. The construction began in January 1947 using old materials with different standards due to difficulties in obtaining new materials.

The first section of the Shin-Keisei Line (新京成線, Shin-Keisei-sen) was opened and electrified at 1,500 V DC (overhead), 2.5 km (1.6 mi) from Shin-Tsudanuma to Yakuendai, on 27 December 1947. The Yakuendai–Takifudo section was reopened in 1948, and extended to Hatsutomi the following year. The reopened sections were regauged to 1,372 mm (4 ft 6 in) in October 1953, and the entire line was reopened as a single-track line by 21 April 1955. In August 1959, the line was again regauged, this time to 1,435 mm (4 ft 8 1/2 in) to match the standard gauge used by Keisei Electric Railway.

=== Acquisition by Keisei Electric Railway ===
On 31 October 2023, it was announced that the Shin-Keisei Line would be merged into the Keisei Electric Railway and renamed to the Matsudo Line (松戸線, Matsudo-sen), which was completed on 1 April 2025. Stations were renumbered to KS-66 at Shin-Tsudanuma through KS-88 at Matsudo. The restructuring was the result of revenue loss owing to the effects of COVID-19 on public transportation. To prepare for the merger, Keisei purchased all remaining shares of the Shin-Keisei Electric Railway in September 2022 which resulted in Shin-Keisei becoming a wholly owned subsidiary of Keisei. The Ministry of Land, Infrastructure, Transport and Tourism approved the merger on 25 June 2024. The line's fares and service schedules did not change when the merger took place, although the pink-colored station infrastructure and trains will be repainted to Keisei's color scheme.

== Operations ==
All trains stop at all stations. Most trains operate throughout the line, although during the morning hours, some services terminate at Shin-Tsudanuma. In mornings and nights some trains originate or terminate at Kunugiyama. Services operate at a frequency of one train every 4 minutes in the morning peak, every 10 minutes during the day, and every 8 minutes in the evening peak. During the daytime, the Matsudo Line runs alternate through trains to Chiba-Chūō on the Keisei Chiba Line.

=== List of stations ===
No.	Station	Distance in km (mi)		Transfers	Location
No.	Station	Between stations	Total	Transfers	Location
KS88	Matsudo 松戸	—N/a	0 (0)	Jōban Line (Rapid) (JJ06); Jōban Line (Local) (JL22)	Matsudo
KS87	Kamihongō 上本郷	1.7 (1.1)	1.7 (1.1)		Matsudo
KS86	Matsudo-Shinden 松戸新田	0.7 (0.43)	2.4 (1.5)		Matsudo
KS85	Minoridai みのり台	0.6 (0.37)	3.0 (1.9)		Matsudo
KS84	Yabashira 八柱	0.8 (0.50)	3.8 (2.4)	Musashino Line (Shin-Yahashira: JM14)	Matsudo
KS83	Tokiwadaira 常盤平	1.8 (1.1)	5.6 (3.5)		Matsudo
KS82	Gokō 五香	1.8 (1.1)	7.4 (4.6)		Matsudo
KS81	Motoyama 元山	1.3 (0.81)	8.7 (5.4)		Matsudo
KS80	Kunugiyama くぬぎ山	0.9 (0.56)	9.6 (6.0)		Kamagaya
KS79	Kita-Hatsutomi 北初富	1.7 (1.1)	11.3 (7.0)		Kamagaya
KS78	Shin-Kamagaya 新鎌ヶ谷	0.8 (0.50)	12.1 (7.5)	Hokusō Line (HS08); Narita Sky Access Line (HS08); Tōbu Urban Park Line (TD30)	Kamagaya
KS77	Hatsutomi 初富	1.2 (0.75)	13.3 (8.3)		Kamagaya
KS76	Kamagaya-Daibutsu 鎌ヶ谷大仏	2.1 (1.3)	15.4 (9.6)		Kamagaya
KS75	Futawamukōdai 二和向台	0.9 (0.56)	16.3 (10.1)		Funabashi
KS74	Misaki 三咲	0.8 (0.50)	17.1 (10.6)		Funabashi
KS73	Takifudō 滝不動	1.4 (0.87)	18.5 (11.5)		Funabashi
KS72	Takanekōdan 高根公団	1.0 (0.62)	19.5 (12.1)		Funabashi
KS71	Takanekido 高根木戸	0.6 (0.37)	20.1 (12.5)		Funabashi
KS70	Kita-Narashino 北習志野	0.9 (0.56)	21.0 (13.0)	Tōyō Rapid Railway Line (TR04)	Funabashi
KS69	Narashino 習志野	0.7 (0.43)	21.7 (13.5)		Funabashi
KS68	Yakuendai 薬園台	0.8 (0.50)	22.5 (14.0)		Funabashi
KS67	Maebara 前原	1.4 (0.87)	23.9 (14.9)		Funabashi
KS66	Shin-Tsudanuma 新津田沼	1.4 (0.87)	25.3 (15.7)	Sōbu Line (Tsudanuma: JO26); Chūō–Sōbu Line (Tsudanuma: JB33)	Narashino
KS26	Keisei-Tsudanuma 京成津田沼	1.2 (0.75)	26.5 (16.5)	Chiba Line (Some through services); Main Line	Narashino

== Rolling stock ==
- Shin-Keisei 8800 series (since 1986)
- Shin-Keisei 8900 series (since 1993)
- Shin-Keisei N800 series (since May 2005)
- Shin-Keisei 80000 series (since December 2019)

All trains are based at Kunugiyama and Tsudanuma Depots.

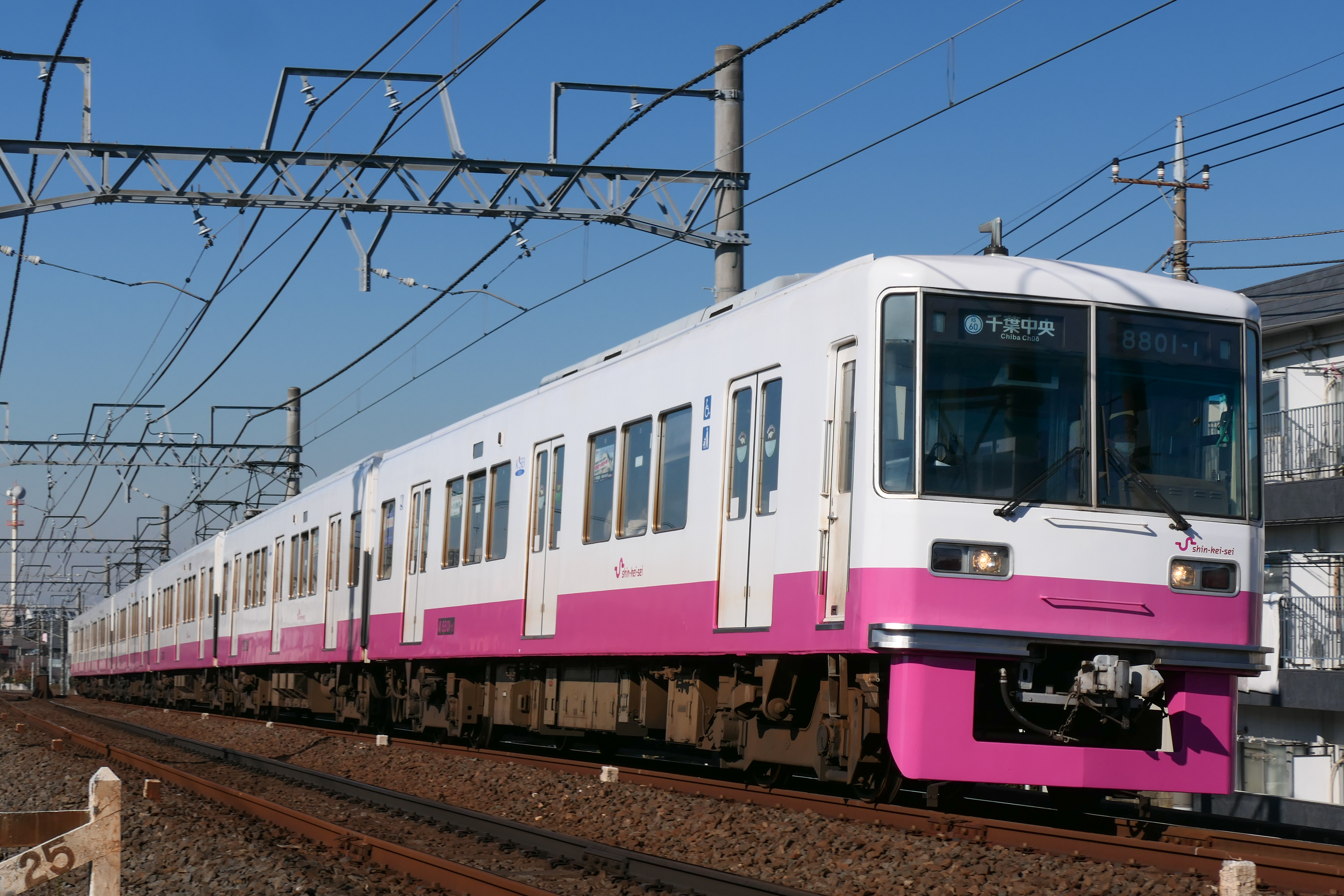
Shin-Keisei 8800 series

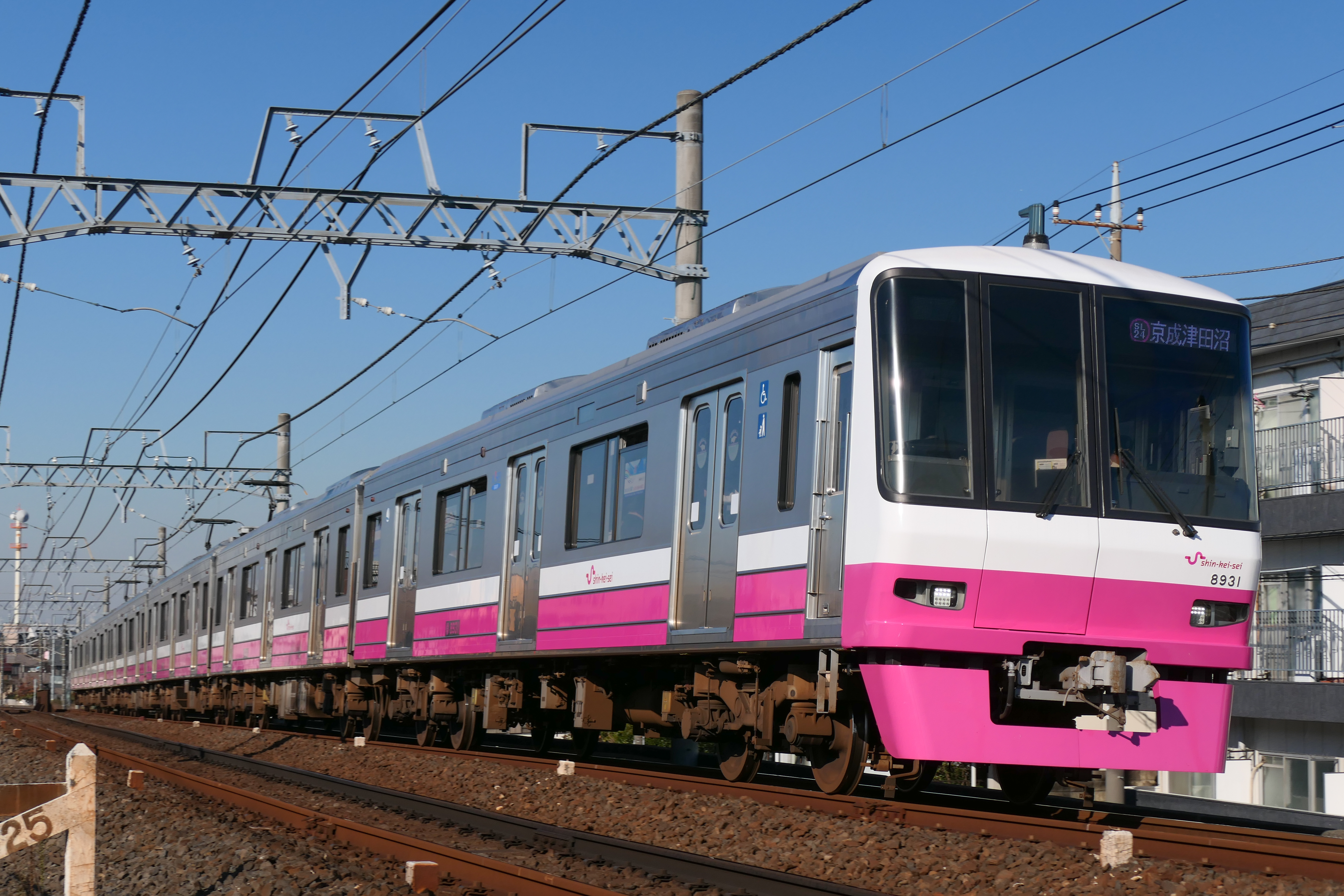
Shin-Keisei 8900 series

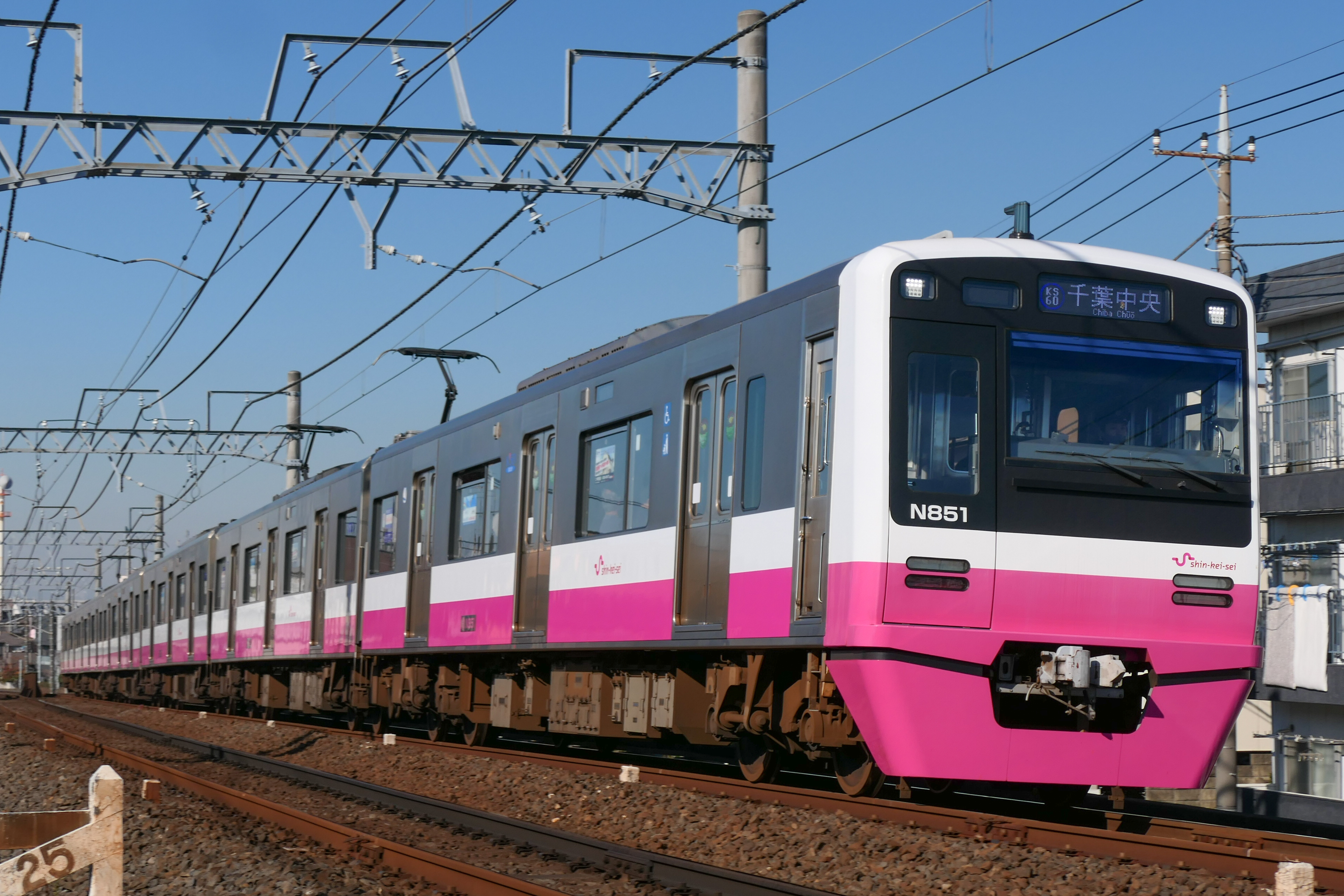
Shin-Keisei N800 series

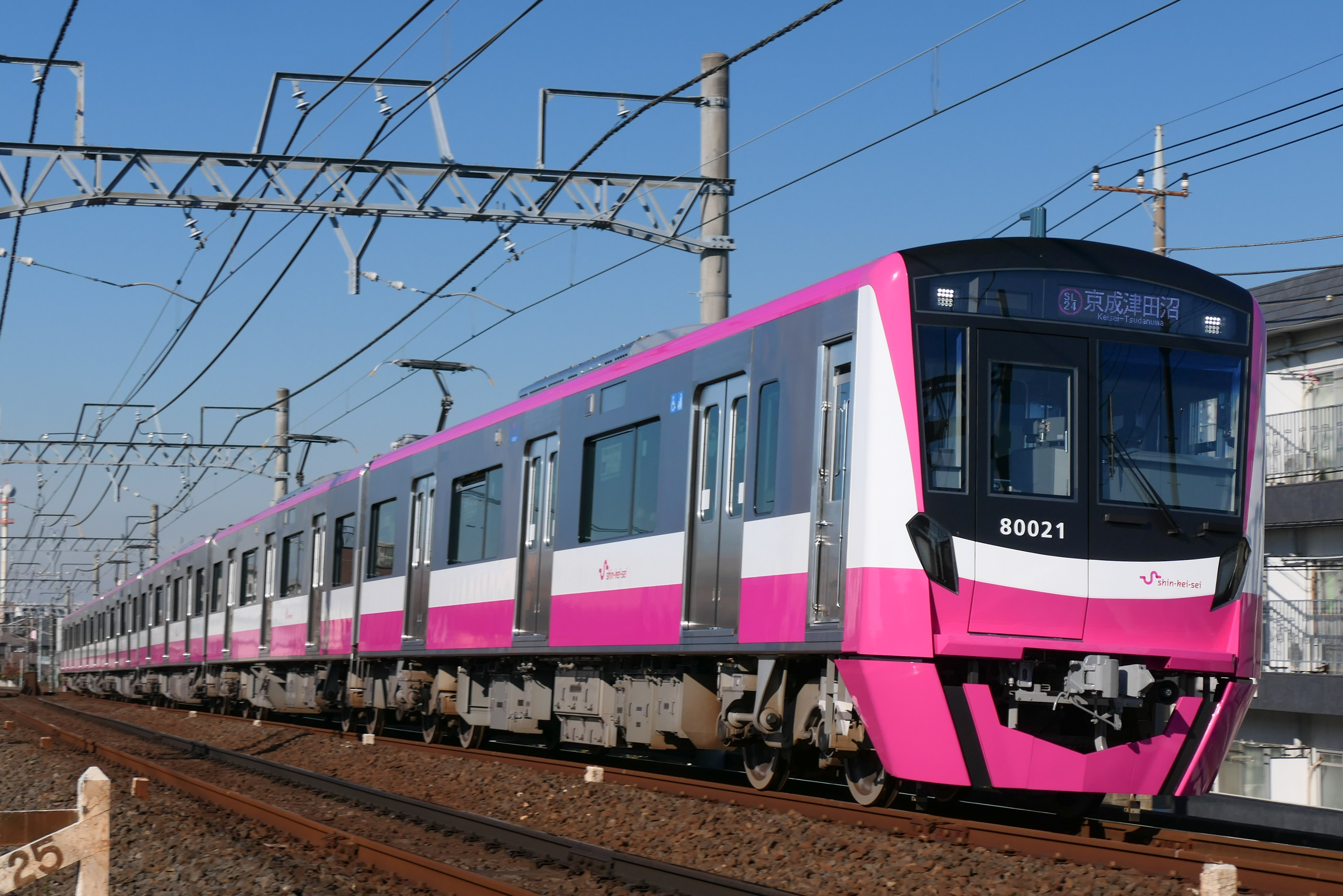
Shin-Keisei 80000 series

=== Former ===
- Keisei 33/39/45 series
- Keisei 100/126 series
- Keisei 200/220/250/500/550/2300 series
- Keisei 300 series
- Keisei 600 series
- Keisei 700/2200 series
- Keisei 1100 series
- Keisei 1500 series
- Keisei 2100 series
- Shin-Keisei 800 series (from 1974 until 2010)
- Shin-Keisei 8000 series (from 1978 until 2021)
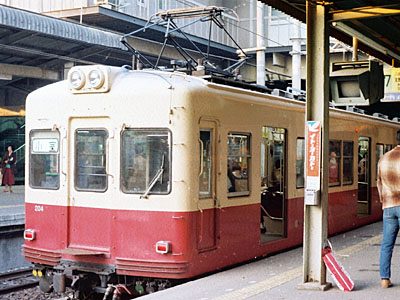
Keisei 200 series

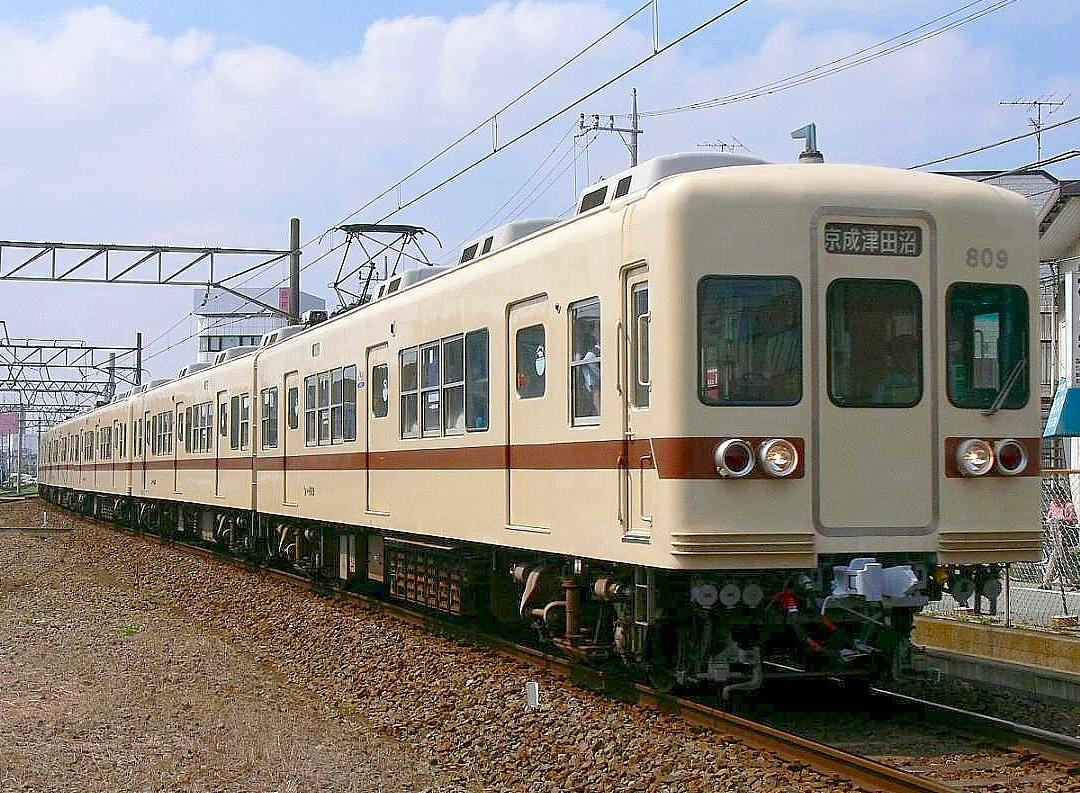
Shin-Keisei 800 series

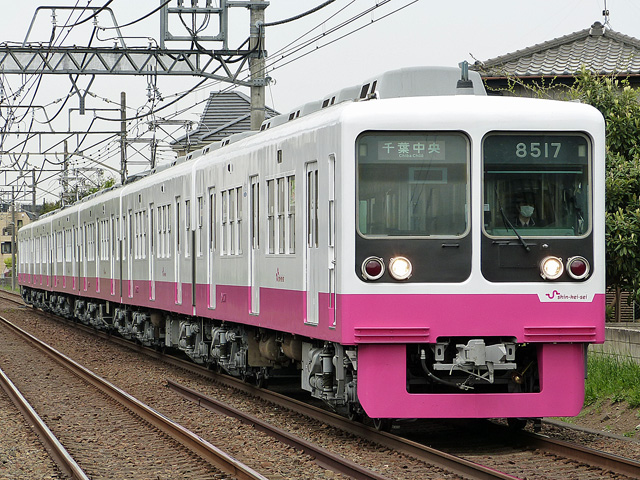
Shin-Keisei 8000 series in revised livery in April 2017
