= Takanekōdan Station =

Railway station in Funabashi, Chiba Prefecture, Japan

KS72 Takanekōdan Station 高根公団駅
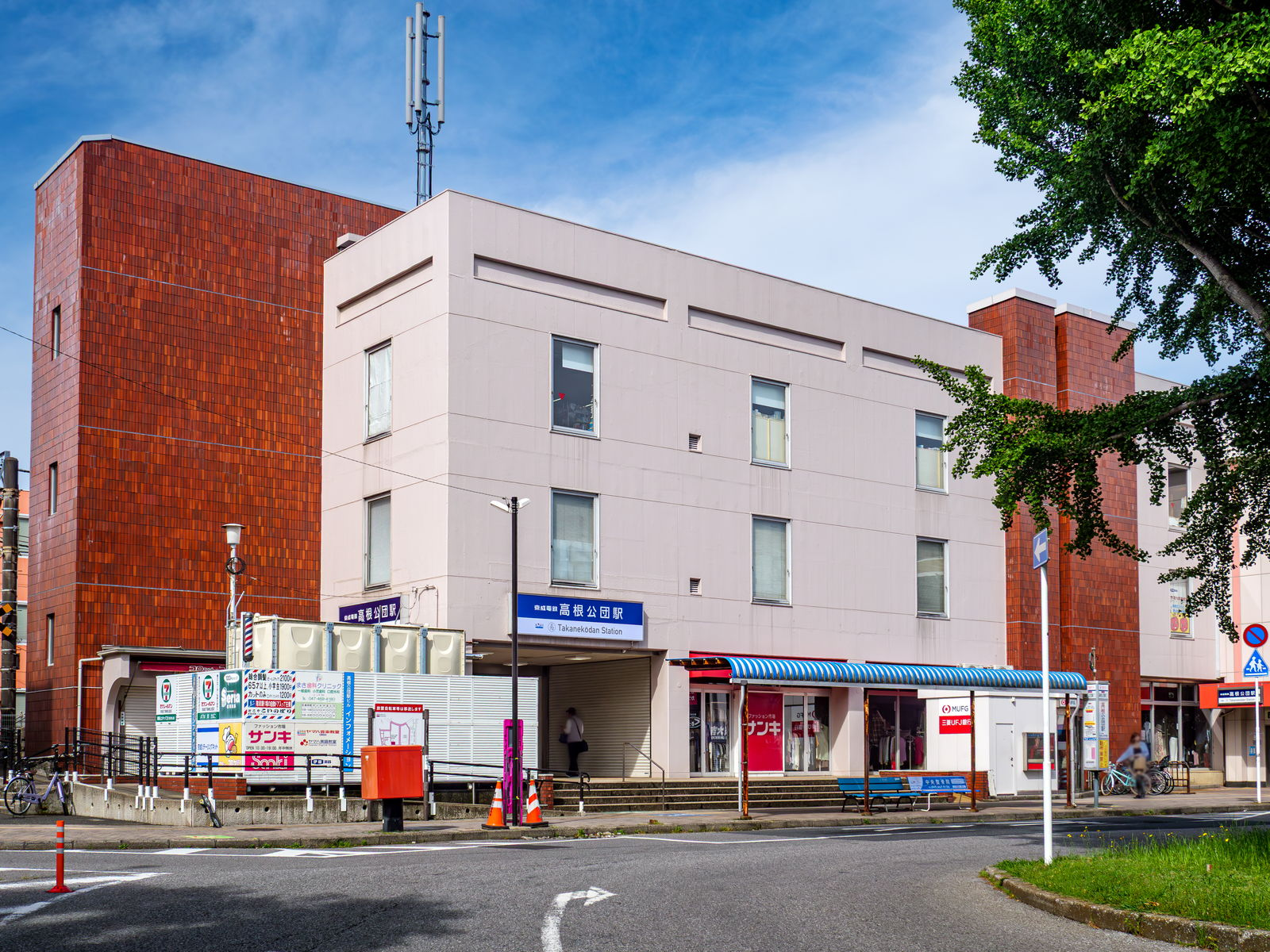
- Takanekōdan Station, May 2025

General information
- Location: 1-6-1 Takanedai, Funabashi-shi, Chiba-ken 274-0065; Japan
- Coordinates: 35.7303°N 140.0293°E
- Operator: Keisei Electric Railway
- Line: Keisei Matsudo Line
- Distance: 19.5 km (12.1 mi) from Matsudo
- Platforms: 1 island platform

Construction
- Structure type: At grade

Other information
- Station code: ○KS72
- Website: Official website

History
- Opened: 1 August 1961; 65 years ago

Passengers
- 2018: 15,643 daily

Services
Preceding station	Keisei	Following station
Takifudō KS73 towards Matsudo	Matsudo Line	Takanekido KS71 towards Keisei Tsudanuma
Location
- Location within Chiba Prefecture Location within Japan

Takanekōdan Station (高根公団駅, Takanekōdan-eki) is a passenger railway station located in the city of Funabashi, Chiba Prefecture, Japan, operated by the private railway operator Keisei Electric Railway.

== Lines ==
Takanekōdan Station is served by the Keisei Matsudo Line, and is located 19.5 kilometers from the terminus of the line at Matsudo Station.

== Station layout ==
The station consists of a single island platform, with an elevated station building.

=== Platforms ===
1	■ Keisei Matsudo Line	For Kita-Narashino, Shin-Tsudanuma, Keisei-Tsudanuma
2	■ Keisei Matsudo Line	For Shin-Kamagaya, Yabashira, Matsudo

== History ==
Takanekōdan Station was opened on 1 August 1961 on the Shin Keisei Railway. It takes its name from a local public housing project.

Effective April 2025, the station came under the aegis of Keisei Electric Railway as the result of the buyout of the Shin-Keisei Electric Railway. The acquisition was completed on 1 April 2025.

== Passenger statistics ==
In fiscal 2018, the station was used by an average of 15,643 passengers daily.

== Surrounding area ==
- Funabashi City Hall Takanedai Branch Office
- Funabashi City Takanedai Junior High School
- Funabashi City Takanedai Daisan Elementary School
- Funabashi City Takanedai Daini Elementary School

== See also ==
- List of railway stations in Japan
