= Shin-Keisei N800 series =

Japanese train type

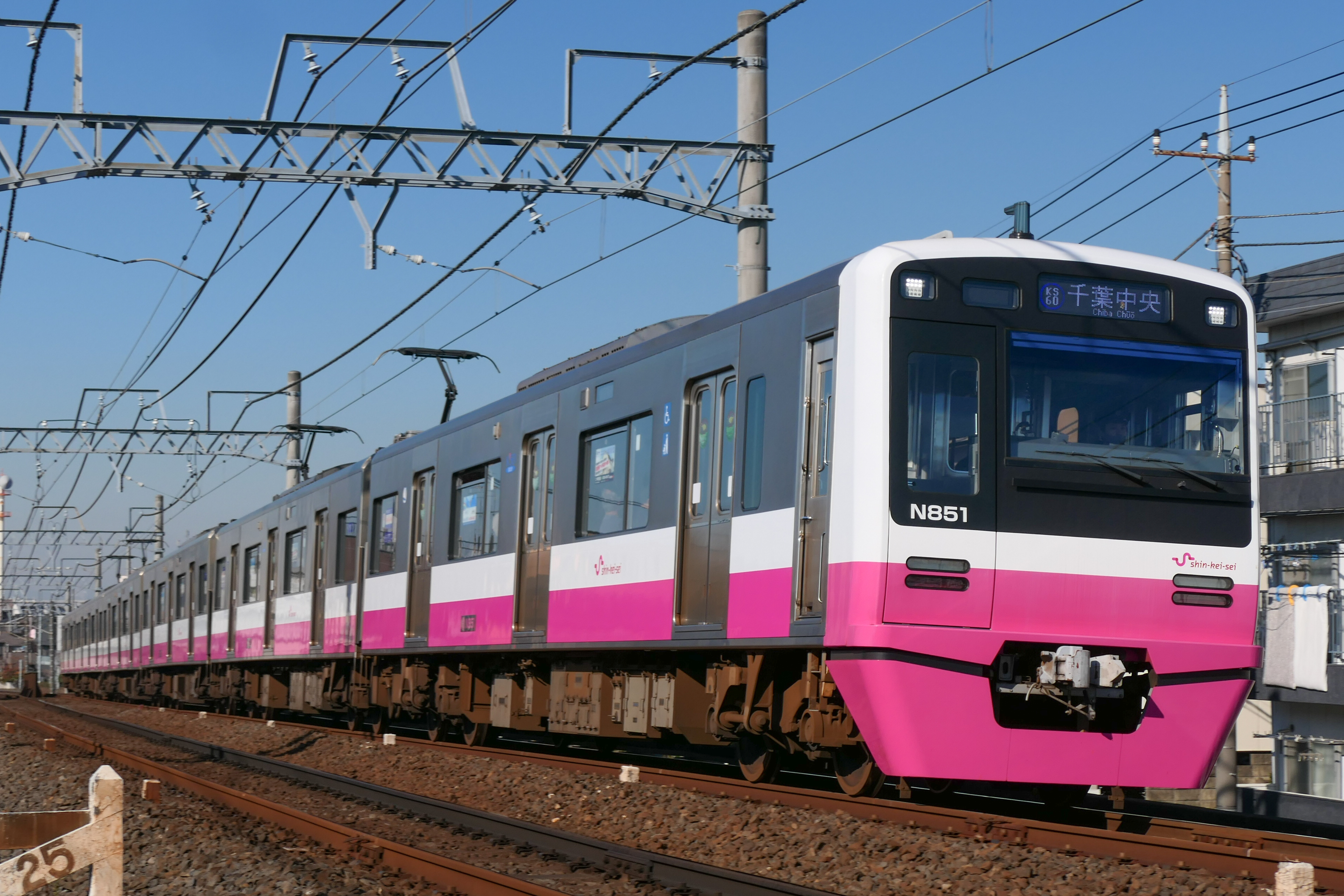
- Set N851 in revised livery, December 2021
- In service: 2005–present
- Manufacturer: Nippon Sharyo
- Replaced: 800 series
- Constructed: 2005–
- Entered service: 29 May 2005
- Number built: 30 vehicles (5 sets)
- Number in service: 30 vehicles (5 sets)
- Formation: 6 cars per set
- Fleet numbers: N811–N851
- Operator: Keisei Electric Railway
- Depot: Kunugiyama
- Lines served: Keisei Matsudo Line; Keisei Chiba Line

Specifications
- Car body construction: Stainless steel
- Car length: 18,000 mm (59 ft 1 in)
- Width: 2,768 mm (9 ft 1.0 in)
- Doors: 3 pairs per side
- Maximum speed: 120 km/h (75 mph)
- Acceleration: 3.5 km/(h⋅s) (2.2 mph/s)
- Deceleration: 4.0 km/(h⋅s) (2.5 mph/s) (service); 4.5 km/(h⋅s) (2.8 mph/s) (emergency)
- Electric system: 1,500 V DC
- Current collection: Overhead wire
- Bogies: FS-564S (motored), FS-064S (trailer)
- Track gauge: 1,435 mm (4 ft 8 1/2 in)

The Shin-Keisei N800 series (新京成N800形) is an electric multiple unit (EMU) train type operated by the private railway operator Keisei Electric Railway. The type entered service with Shin-Keisei Electric Railway on the Shin-Keisei Line (now Keisei Matsudo Line) in Chiba Prefecture, Japan, in May 2005.

== Design ==
Built by Nippon Sharyo in Aichi Prefecture, the N800 series design is based on the Keisei 3000 series EMU. Although built as 6-car sets, the units are designed to be lengthened to 8-car sets in the future if required. The N800 series is also intended for use on inter-running services to and from the Keisei Chiba Line. The sets have a maximum speed of 120 km/h (75 mph), but only operate at 85 km/h (55 mph) in service.

== Formations ==
As of 1 April 2015, the fleet consists of three six-car sets based at Kunugiyama Depot with four motored (M) cars and two trailer (T) cars, formed as shown below, with the Mc1 car at the Tsudanuma end.

Car No.	1	2	3	4	5	6
Designation	Mc1	M2	T3	T6	M7	Mc8
Numbering	N8x1	N8x2	N8x3	N8x6	N8x7	N8x8
Weight (t)	33.0	33.0	27.0	27.0	33.0	33.0
Capacity (total/seated)	122/43	133/52	133/52	133/52	133/52	122/43

- "x" in the car numbers stands for the set number.
- The M2 and M7 cars are each fitted with two single-arm-type pantographs.
- The T6 cars are designated as having mild air-conditioning.

== Interior ==
Passenger accommodation consists of longitudinal bench seating throughout. Each car has priority seating at one end, and the two end cars each have a wheelchair space located close to the cab end. Some of the bench seats have metal steps on the underside, allowing them to be detached and used as steps for evacuating the train in emergencies.

== History ==
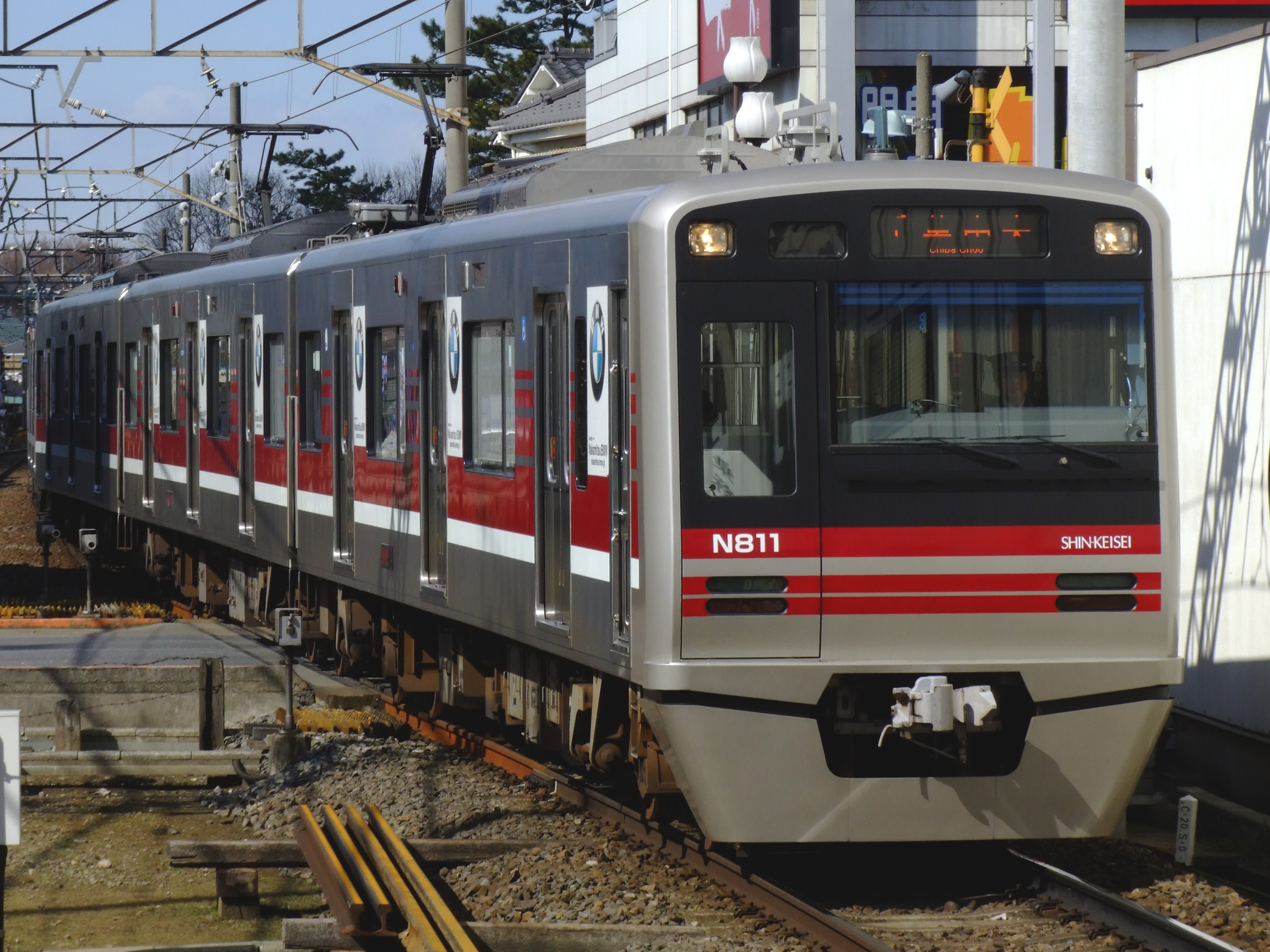
Set N811 in original livery, February 2007

The first set, N811, entered service on 29 May 2005.

The first set to receive Shin-Keisei's new pink corporate livery introduced in 2014 was N821 in February 2015.

The fourth set, N841, entered service on 22 December 2015. It is the first Shin-Keisei trainset to feature LED lighting and LCD passenger information displays from new. A fifth set, N851, was delivered in August 2018, entering service on 22 August of that year.

On 24 July 2024, set N831 returned to service in the original livery with maroon waistline stripes.

On 1 April 2025, all sets were transferred to Keisei following its acquisition of the Shin-Keisei Electric Railway. Beginning in July 2025, the N800 series fleet received the standard livery based on that of the Keisei 3000 series.
