= Keisei 3200 series =

Japanese electric multiple unit train type

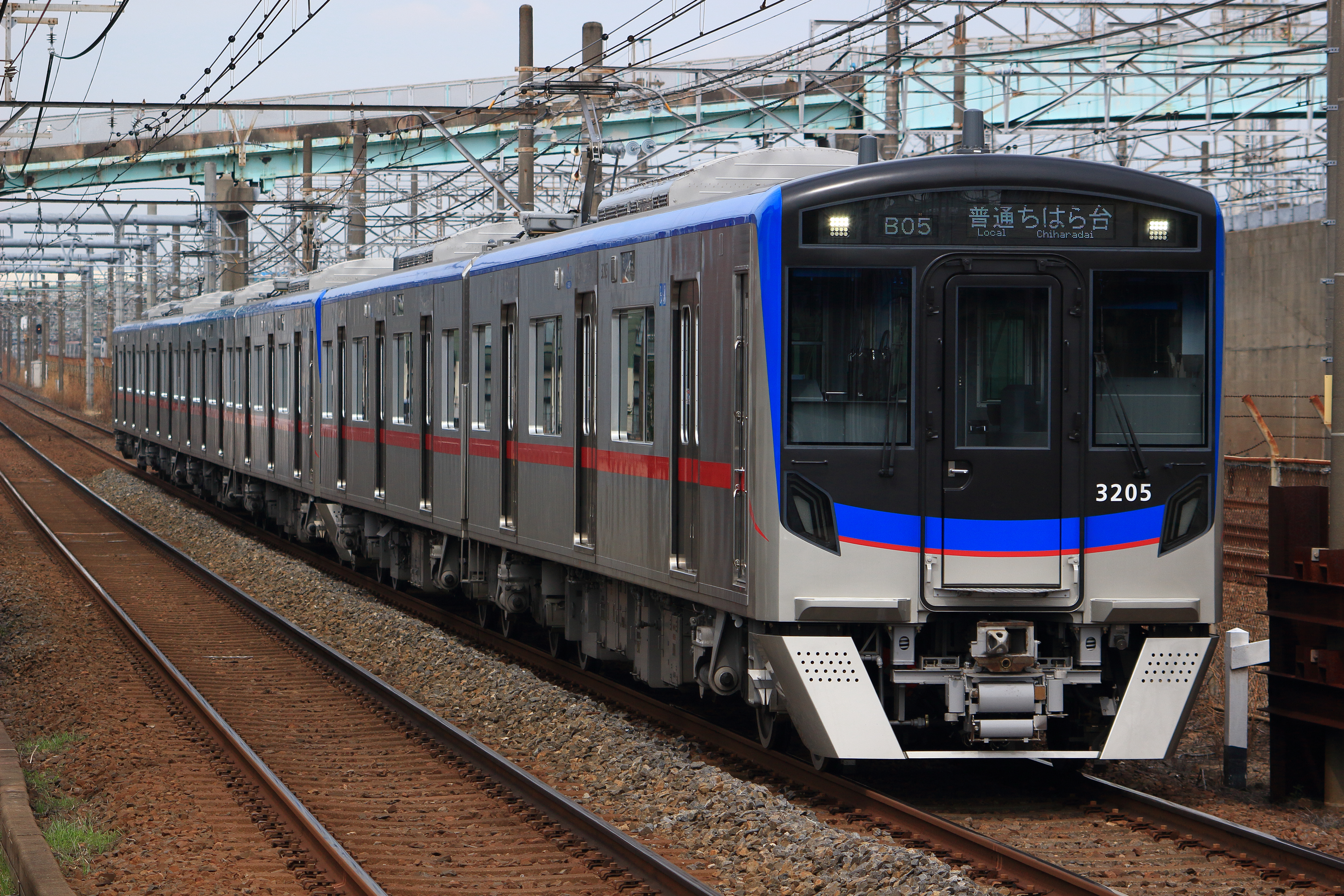
- A 3200 series formation in March 2025
- In service: 22 February 2025 – present
- Manufacturers: Nippon Sharyo; J-TREC
- Replaced: 3500 series
- Constructed: 2024–
- Number under construction: 88 vehicles
- Number built: 6 vehicles
- Formation: Various
- Operator: Keisei Electric Railway
- Lines served: Keisei Main Line; Keisei Chiba Line

Specifications
- Car body construction: Stainless steel
- Car length: 18,000 mm (59 ft 1 in)
- Width: 2,845 mm (9 ft 4 in)
- Height: 4,050 mm (13 ft 3 in)
- Doors: 3 per side
- Maximum speed: 120 km/h (75 mph)
- Traction system: RG6056-A-M SiC–VVVF
- Traction motors: Three-phase induction motor
- Power output: 140 kW (190 hp) × 6 per half-set
- Acceleration: 3.5 km/(h⋅s) (2.2 mph/s)
- Deceleration: 4.0 km/(h⋅s) (2.5 mph/s) (service); 4.5 km/(h⋅s) (2.8 mph/s) (emergency)
- Electric systems: 1,500 V DC (overhead line)
- Current collection: Pantograph
- Safety system: C-ATS
- Multiple working: Within type (up to 8 cars)

Notes/references
- Specifications

The Keisei 3200 series (Japanese: 京成3200形) is a commuter electric multiple unit (EMU) train type operated by the private railway operator Keisei Electric Railway in Japan since 2025.

== Design ==
Based on the 3100 series design introduced in 2019, the 3200 series was designed as a "flexible train", allowing trainsets to be arranged in 4-, 6-, or 8-car formations as needed. The trains use silicon carbide-based VVVF traction control systems, offering 69% energy savings over the traction systems used with the 3500 series trains. The external information displays are automatically disabled at speeds of at least 70 kilometres per hour (43 mph) and re-enabled at speeds of at most 65 km/h (40 mph), offering further energy savings.

To facilitate multiple working, the 3200 series adopts electrical connectors to allow for easier dividing and joining, a first for Keisei. Previous train types used jumper cables to facilitate such operation.

Internally, the trains use LED lighting throughout. Passenger accommodation consists of longitudinal seating. Wheelchair spaces are provided in the end cars, and free spaces for strollers and large luggage are provided in the intermediate cars. Pairs of 17-inch LCD information displays are provided above each passenger door. As a weight-saving measure, the 3200 series uses standard-height seat backs instead of the high seat backs used with the 3100 series.

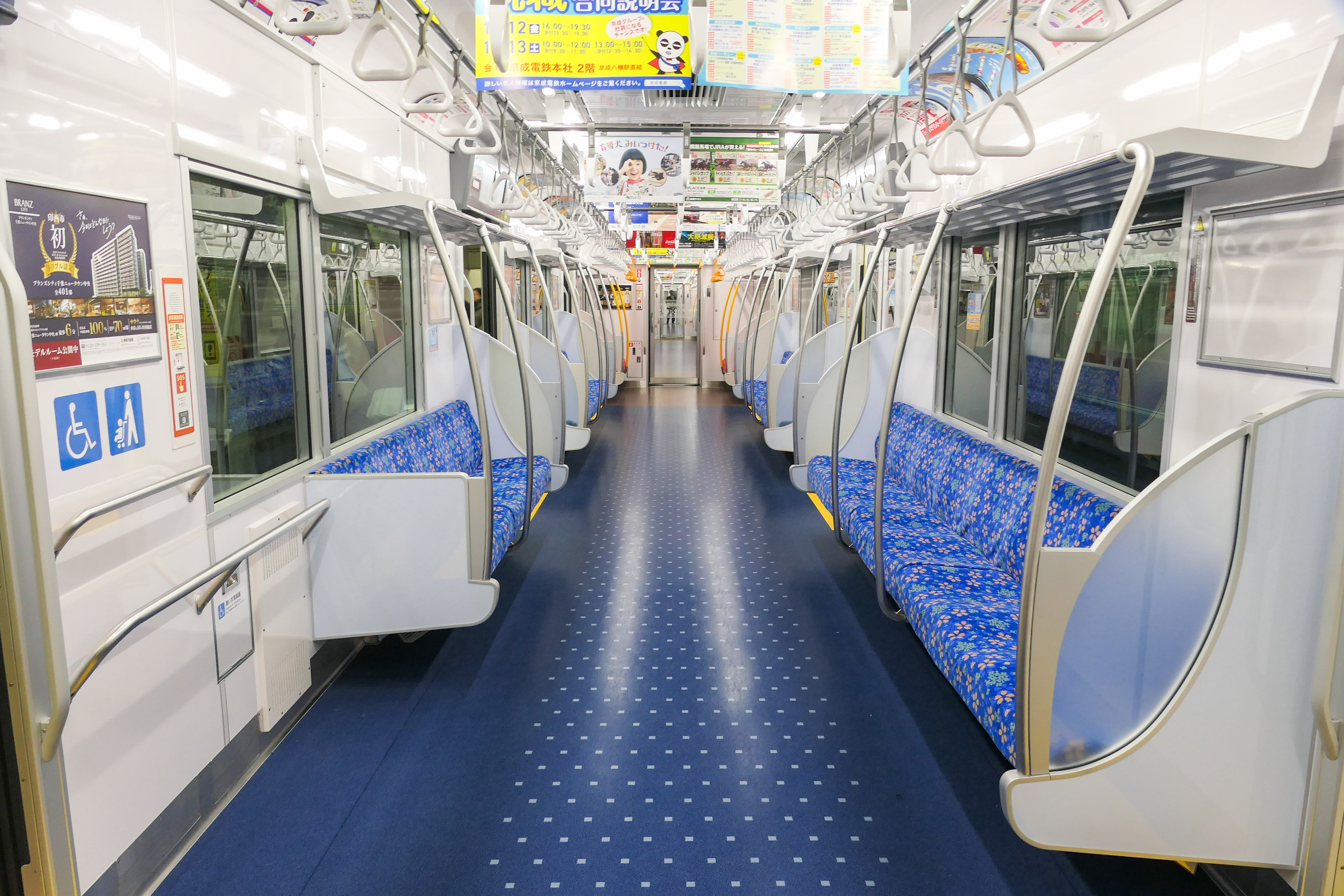
Interior

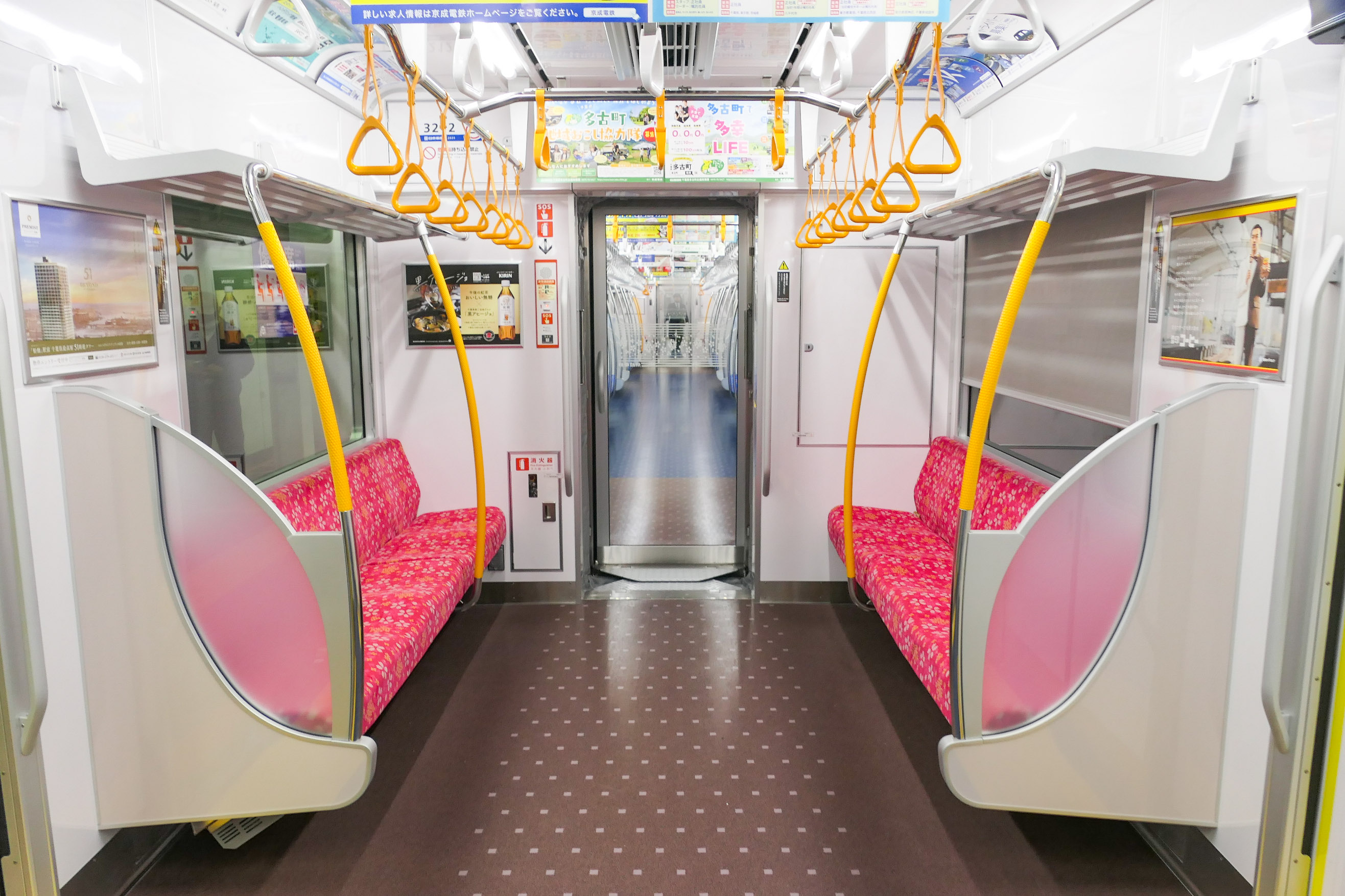
Priority seating

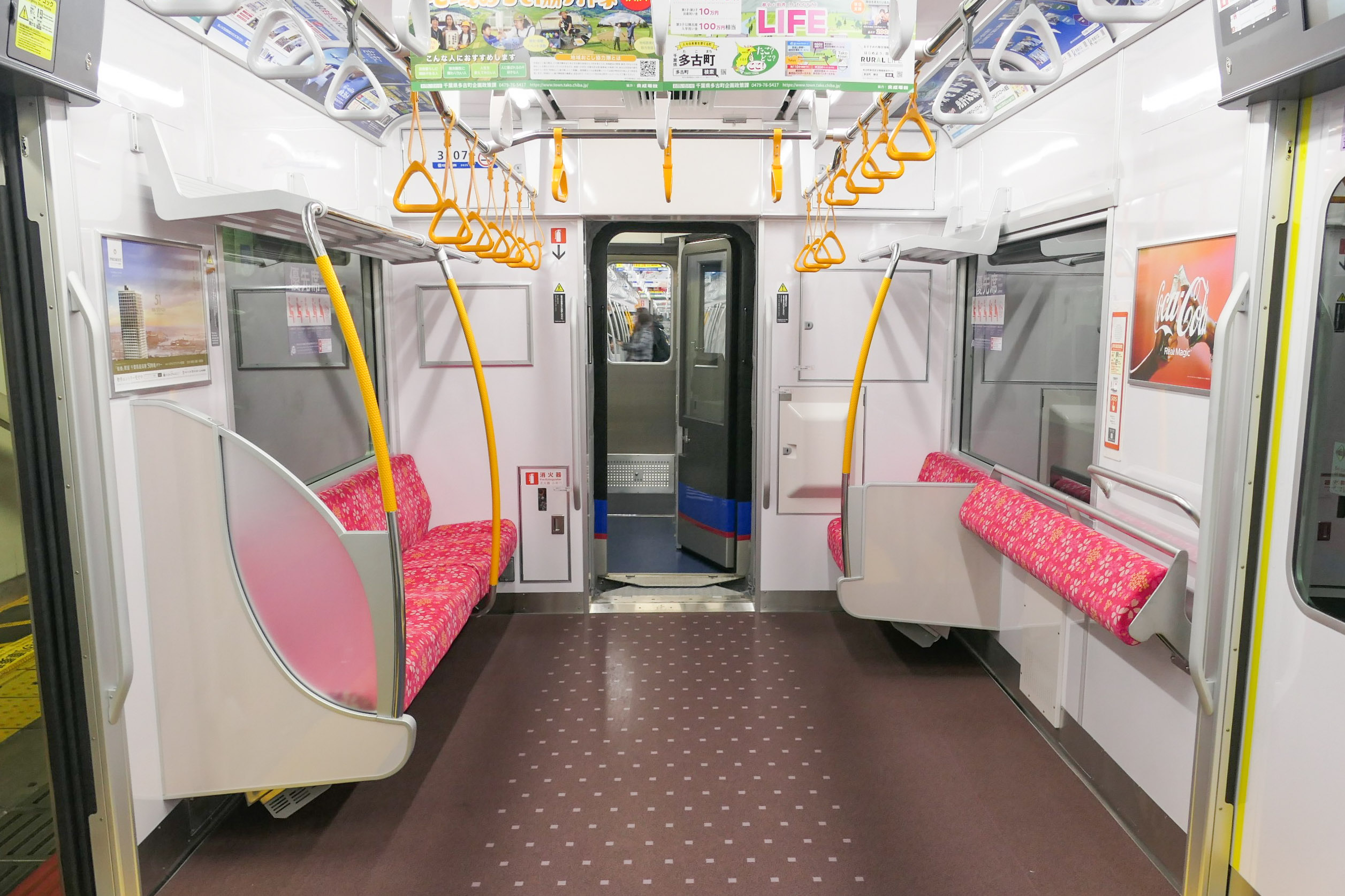
Priority seating with free space at right

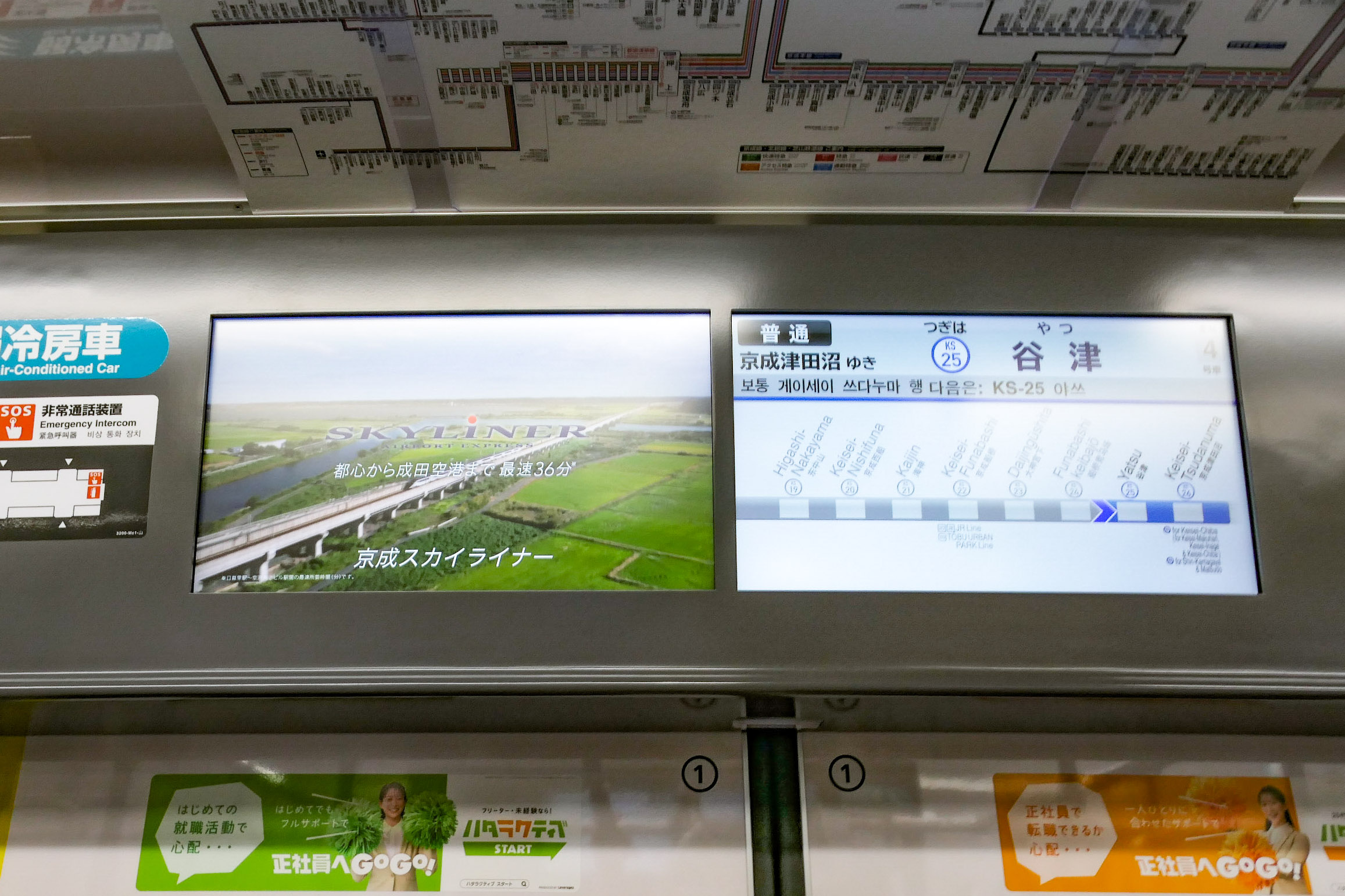
LCD information display

== Operations ==
The 3200 series is slated to replace the ageing 3500 series fleet as well as older trains operated by Shin-Keisei Electric Railway after its merger with Keisei in April 2025. The fleet is primarily used on Keisei Main Line and Chiba Line services, with plans to deploy the type on Kanamachi Line services in the future.

== Formation ==
The 3200 series sets are formed as shown below. All cars are motored, although the "M2" and "Mc2" cars only have one motored bogie.

	← Keisei Ueno Narita Airport →			
Car No.	4	3	2	1
Designation	Mc1	M2	M1	Mc2
Capacity (total/seated)	120/39	133/49	133/49	120/39
Weight (t)	34.9	31.5	33.9	32.7

- The "Mc1" and "M1" cars are each equipped with one single-arm pantograph.

== History ==
The first six cars, 3201–3206, were delivered from the Nippon Sharyo plant in July 2024. Japan Transport Engineering Company (J-TREC) was also contracted to manufacture 3200 series sets.

The 3200 series first entered revenue service on 22 February 2025. On 21 May 2025, Keisei announced plans to procure 90 additional vehicles from fiscal 2025 to 2027. This order was reduced to 88 vehicles in November of that year.
