= Keisei Electric Railway =

Japanese railway company

Keisei Electric Railway Co., Ltd.

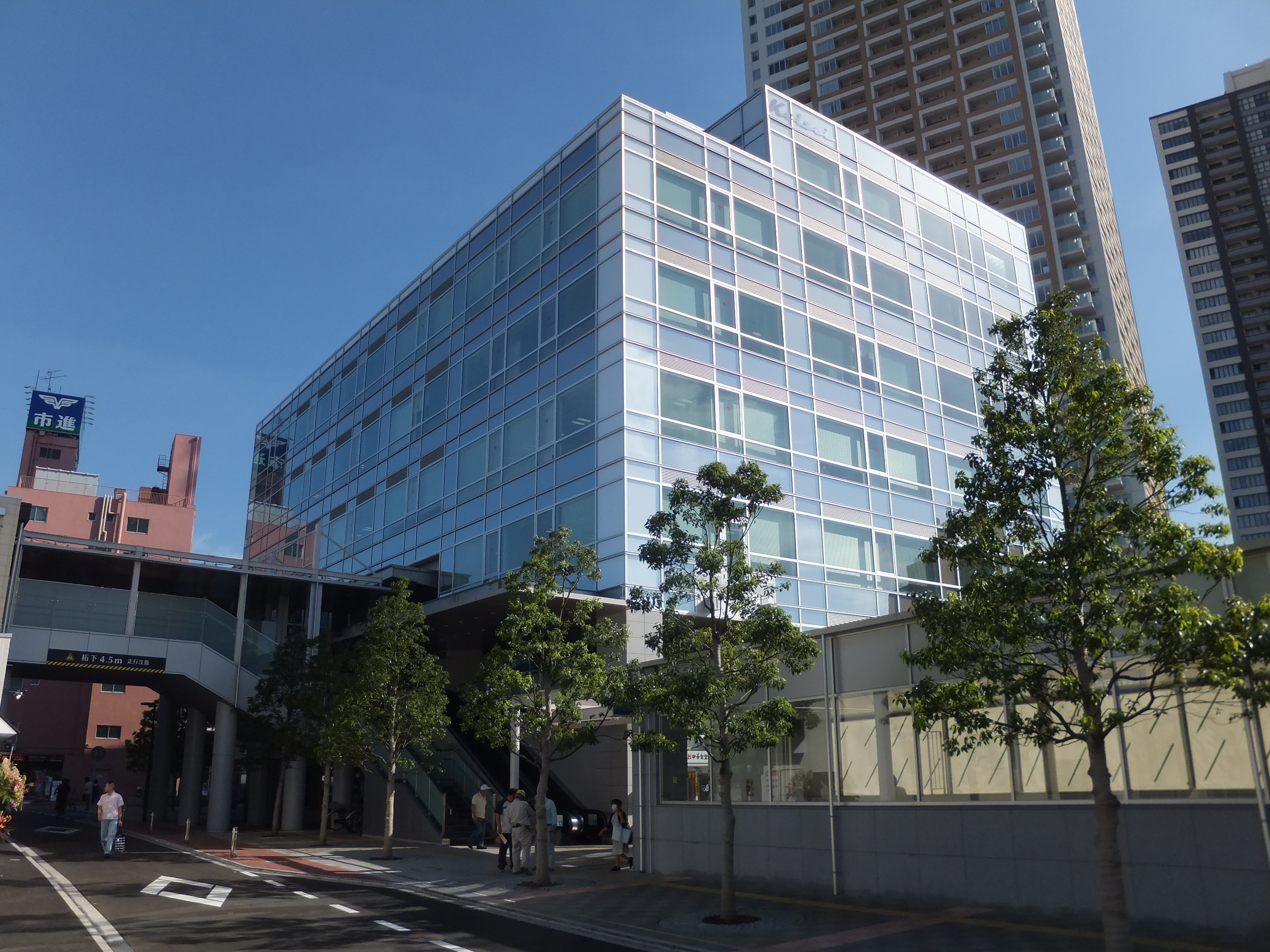
- Keisei Electric Railway headquarters building
- Native name: 京成電鉄株式会社
- Romanized name: Keisei Dentetsu kabushiki gaisha
- Type: Public KK
- Traded as: TYO: 9009; Nikkei 225 component
- Industry: Private railroad
- Founded: 30 June 1909; 116 years ago
- Headquarters: Yawata, Ichikawa, Chiba, Japan,
- Key people: Tsutomu Hanada (Chairman); Toshiya Kobayashi (Representative Director & President)
- Owners: MTBJ investment trusts (17.26%); Custody Bank of Japan investment trusts (7.49% + 1.31%); Nippon Life (3.52%); The Oriental Land Company (3.42% cross ownership); Mizuho Bank (2.85%); MUFG Bank (2.32%); Government Pension Fund of Norway (1.67%); BINCHOTAN FUNDING LTD (1.42%); State Street Treaty 505234 (1.32%)
- Number of employees: 1,728 (2019)
- Subsidiaries: The Oriental Land Company (22.06%); Keisei Bus; Hokuso Railway
- Website: www.keisei.co.jp

Keisei Electric Railway mon, introduced in 1964

Keisei Electric Railway Co., Ltd. (京成電鉄株式会社, Keisei Dentetsu kabushiki gaisha), referred to as Keisei (stylized as K'SEI since 2001), is a major private railway in Chiba Prefecture and Tokyo, Japan. The name Keisei is the combination of the kanji 京 from Tokyo (東京) and 成 from Narita (成田), which the railway's main line connects; the combination uses different readings than the ones used in the city names. The railway's main line runs from Tokyo to Narita and the eastern suburb cities of Funabashi, Narashino, Yachiyo, and Sakura. Keisei runs an airport limited express train called the Skyliner from Ueno and Nippori to Narita International Airport.

In addition to its railway business, Keisei Electric Railway Company owns large bus and taxi services and some real estate holdings. It owns a controlling share of Oriental Land Company which owns and manages the Tokyo Disney Resort and the Disney Resort Line monorail. Keisei is listed on the Tokyo Stock Exchange and is a constituent of the Nikkei 225 index.

== History ==
Keisei was founded on June 30, 1909 and began services on November 3, 1912, initially operating local train service in eastern Tokyo. Its main line reached Narita in 1930 and Ueno in 1933.

Originally a narrow gauge (1,372 mm or 4 ft 6 in Scotch gauge) operator, Keisei converted to 1,435 mm (4 ft 8 1/2 in) standard gauge in 1959. In 1960, Keisei began through service with the Toei Asakusa Line, the first interline through service arrangement in Japan.

Skyliner service began in 1973 and started serving the airport in 1978, when the first Narita Airport Station opened (today's Higashi-Narita station). A new underground station was opened in 1991 to provide a more direct connection to terminal 1, and in 1992 service began to terminal 2. On July 17, 2010, Skyliner switched its route to the newly built Narita Sky Access and reduced the travel time by 15 minutes.

On 31 October 2023, Keisei announced plans to acquire its subsidiary Shin-Keisei Electric Railway. The acquisition was completed on 1 April 2025, and the Shin-Keisei Line was renamed to the Matsudo Line. The acquisition added 26.5 km (16.5 mi) of trackage to the railway's operations.

== Lines ==
Keisei operates 178.3 km (110.8 mi) of railway that consists of one trunk line named the Main Line, six branch lines, and the former Shin-Keisei line.

Map of Keisei Electric Railway

Line	Termini	Distance	Type^{1}
Main Line	Keisei-Ueno – Komaino Junction	67.2 km (41.8 mi)	1
Main Line	Komaino Junction – Narita Airport Terminal 1	2.1 km (1.3 mi)	2
Oshiage Line	Oshiage – Aoto	5.7 km (3.5 mi)	1
Chiba Line	Keisei-Tsudanuma – Chiba Chūō	12.9 km (8.0 mi)	1
Chihara Line	Chiba Chūō – Chiharadai	10.9 km (6.8 mi)	1
Higashi-Narita Line	Keisei-Narita – Higashi-Narita	7.1 km (4.4 mi)	1
Kanamachi Line	Keisei-Takasago – Keisei-Kanamachi	2.5 km (1.6 mi)	1
Matsudo Line	Matsudo – Keisei Tsudanuma	26.5 km (16.5 mi)	1
Narita Sky Access Line (Narita Airport Line)	Keisei-Takasago – Narita Airport Terminal 1	51.4 km (31.9 mi)	2
Overlap	Keisei-Narita – Komaino Junction^{2}	6.0 km (3.7 mi)	1
Overlap	Narita Airport Terminal 2·3 – Narita Airport Terminal 1^{3}	1.0 km (0.6 mi)	2
Total		179.3 km (111.4 mi)	
Projected lines (exp. 2029)
Chihara Line extension	Chiharadai – Amaariki	8.2 km (5.1 mi)	1

Legend

1. "Type" indicates the type of railway business under the Railway Business Act of Japan. Type 1 operator owns and operates the railway while Type 2 operator operates but does not owns the railway.
2. This section is shared by the Main Line and the Higashi-Narita Line.
3. This section is shared by the Main Line and the Narita Airport Line.

== Subsidiaries ==
Keisei Group includes:

- Chiba New Town Railway
- Hokusō Railway (Hokusō Line)
- Kantō Railway
- Kashima Railway Company (Kashima Railway Line, closed in 2007)
- Kominato Railway (Kominato Line)
- Maihama Resort Line (Disney Resort Line)
- Narita Airport Rapid Railway (Owner of a part of Narita Sky Access tracks)
- Nokogiriyama Ropeway
- The Oriental Land Company
- Tsukuba Kankō Railway (Mt. Tsukuba Cable Car and Mt. Tsukuba Ropeway)

Companies related to Keisei, although not a group member:

- Shibayama Railway
- Tōyō Rapid Railway (Tōyō Rapid Railway Line)

== Rolling stock ==
=== Limited express ===
- AE series (since 2010)
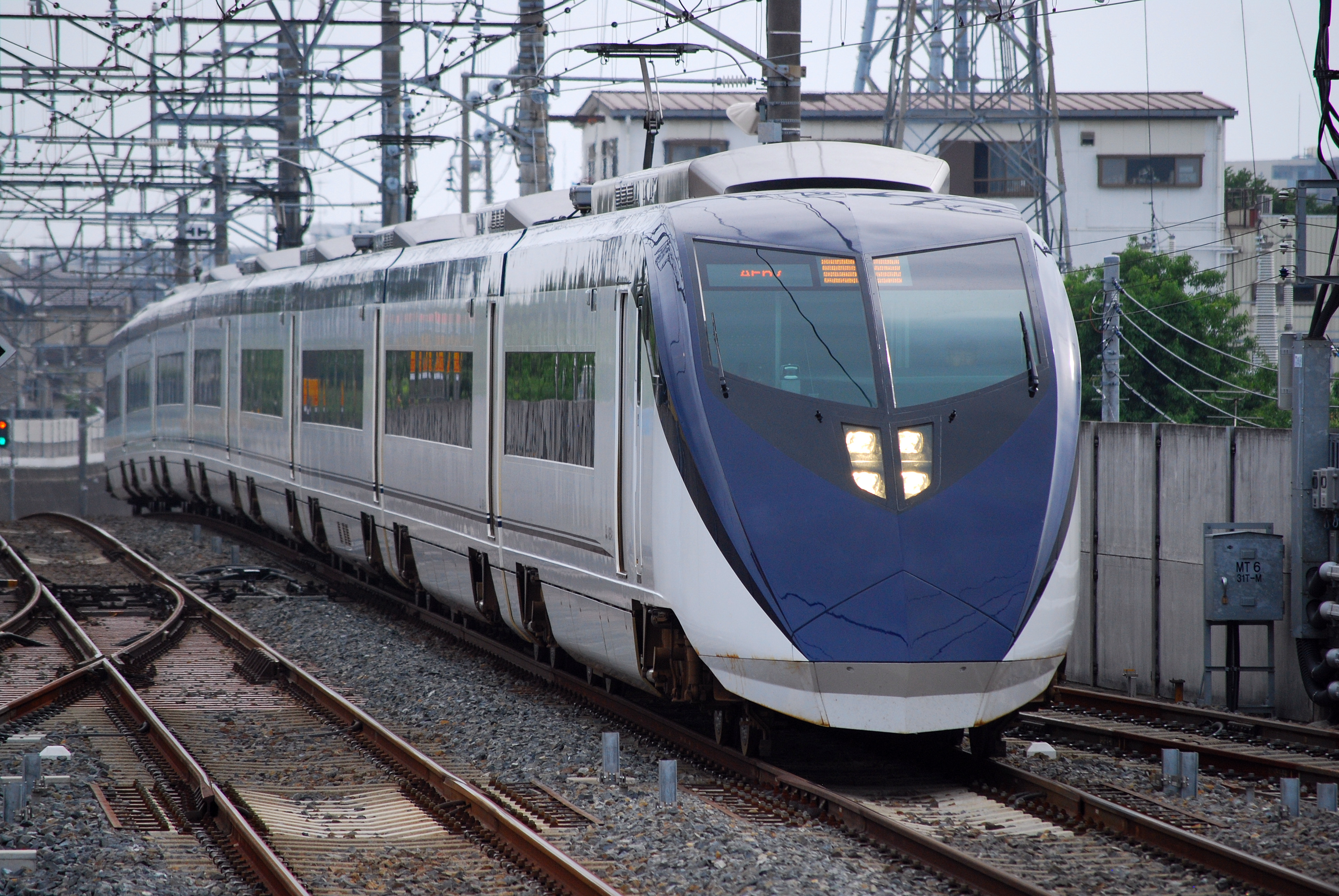
AE series

=== Commuter ===
Main Line

- 3000 series (since 2003)
- 3050 series (since 2010)
- 3100 series (since 2019)
- 3200 series (since 2025)
- 3400 series (since 1993)
- 3500 series (since 1972)
- 3600 series (since 1982)
- 3700 series (since 1991)
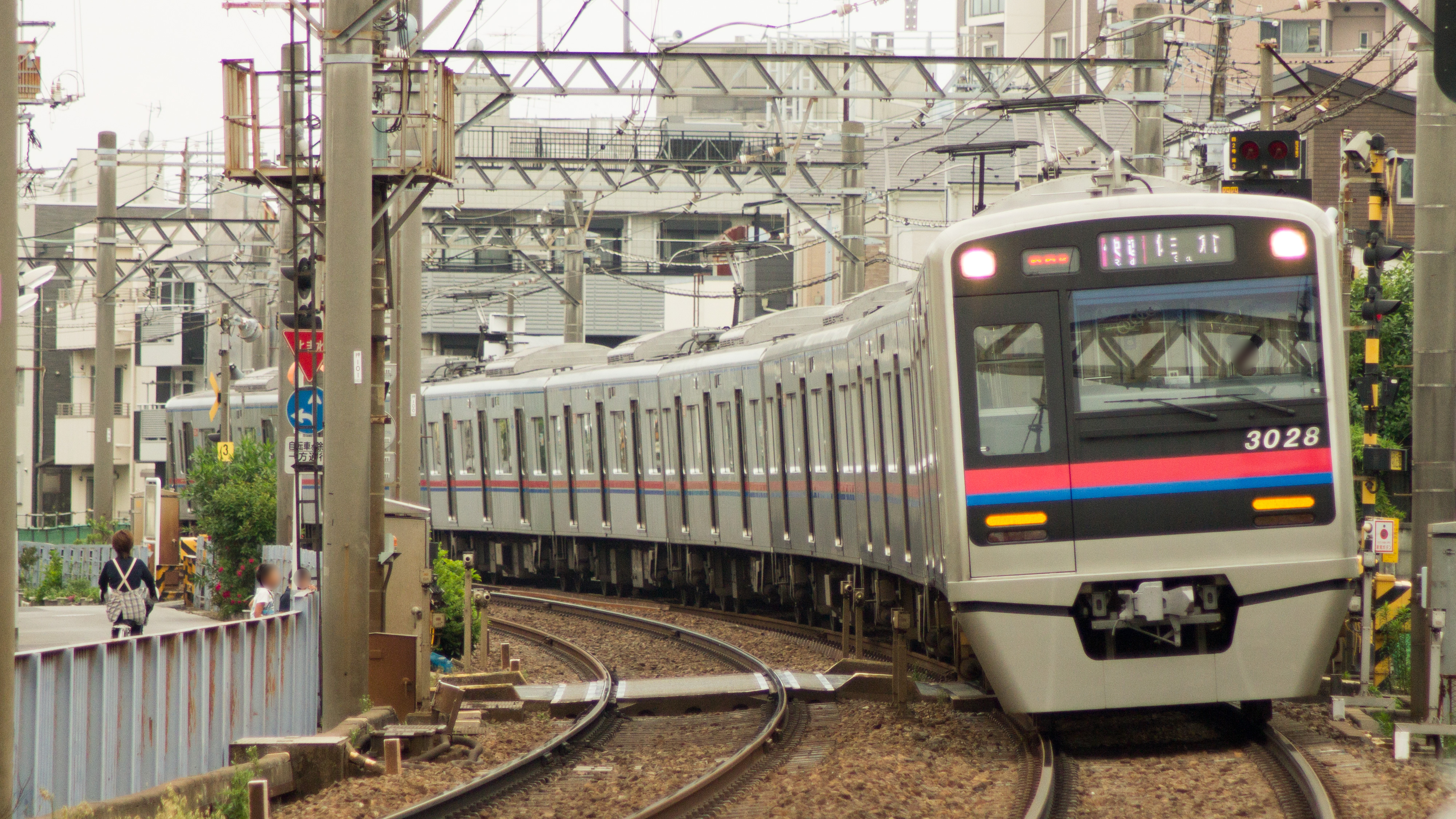
3000 series

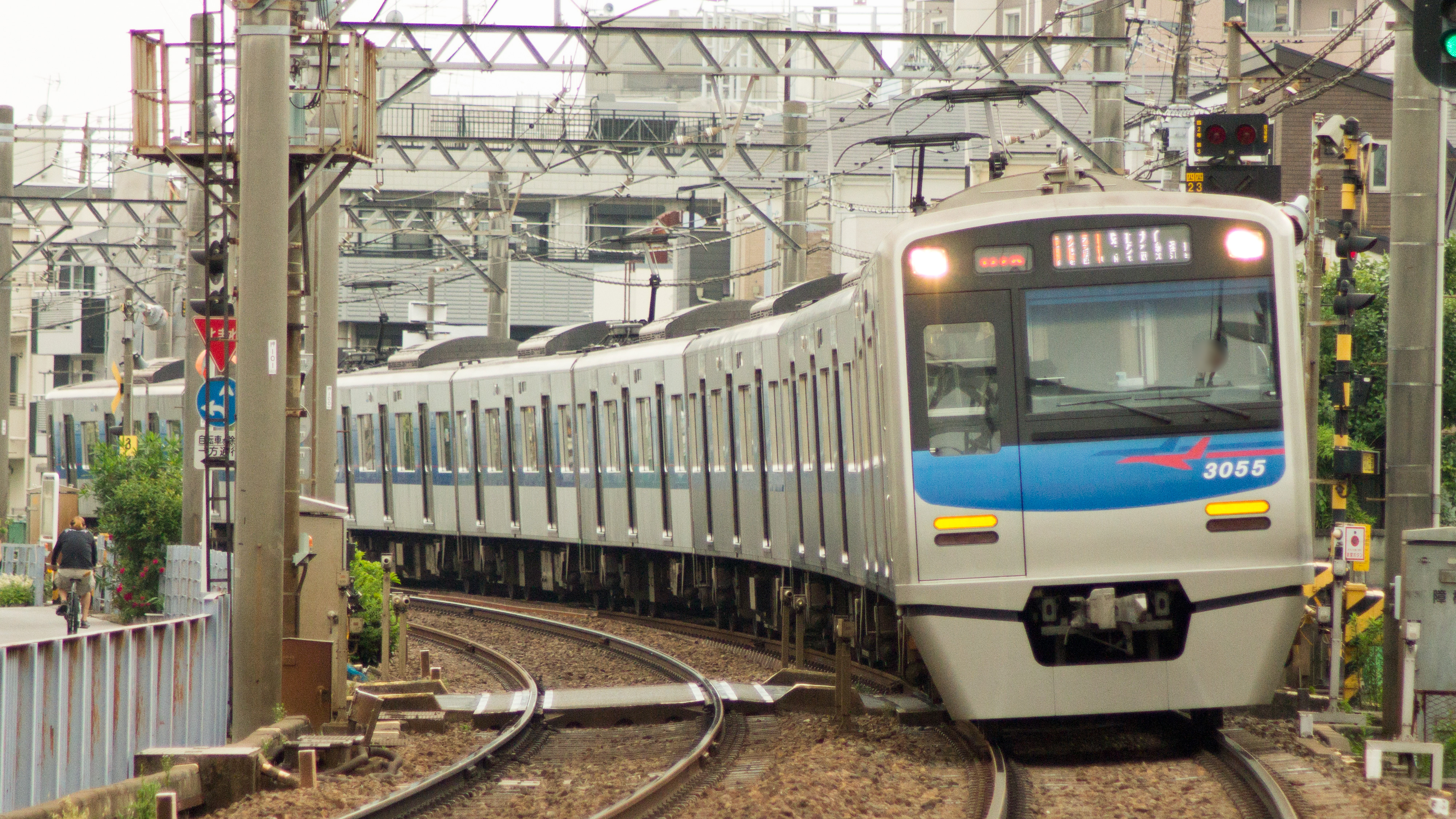
3050 series

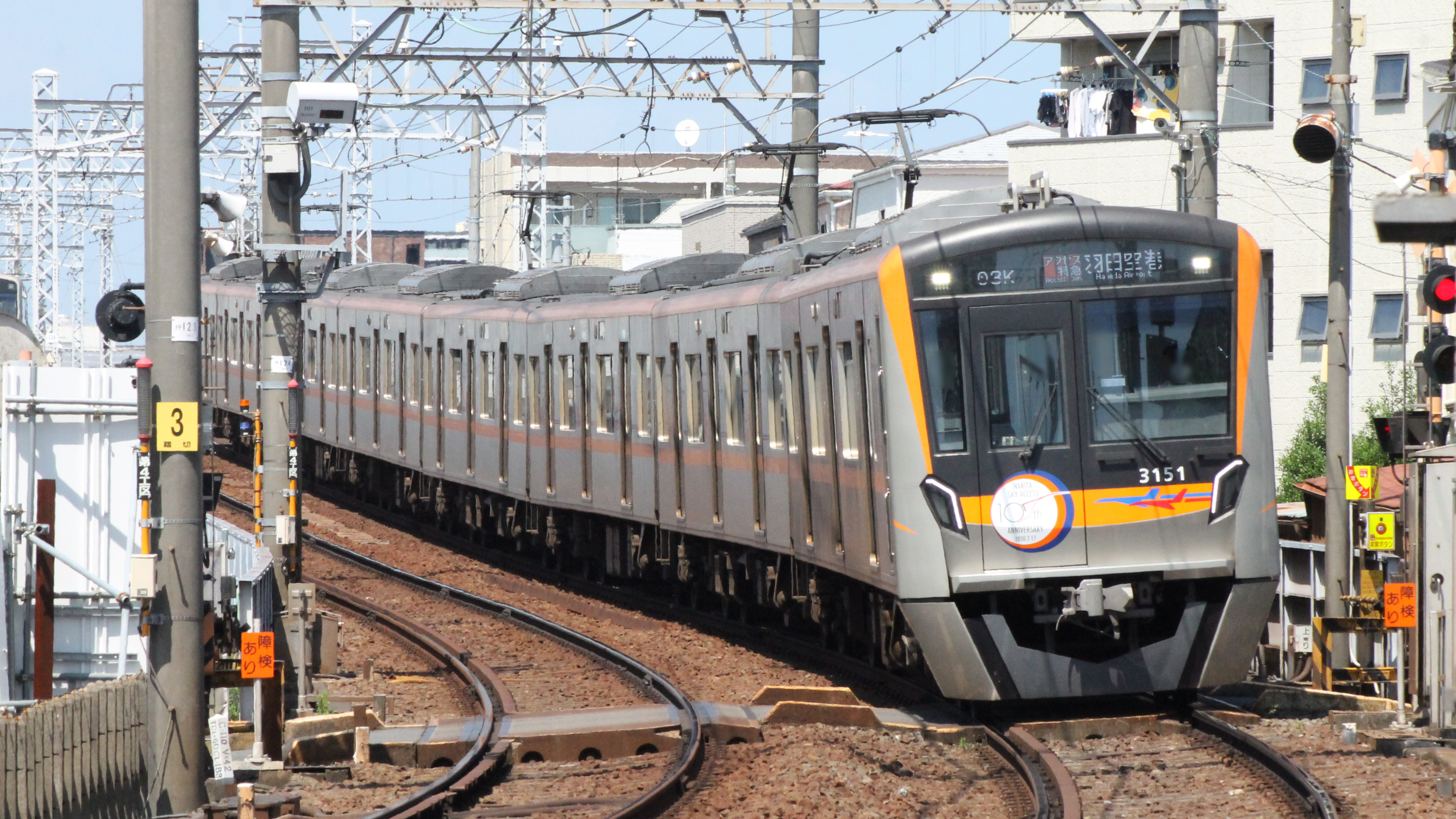
3100 series

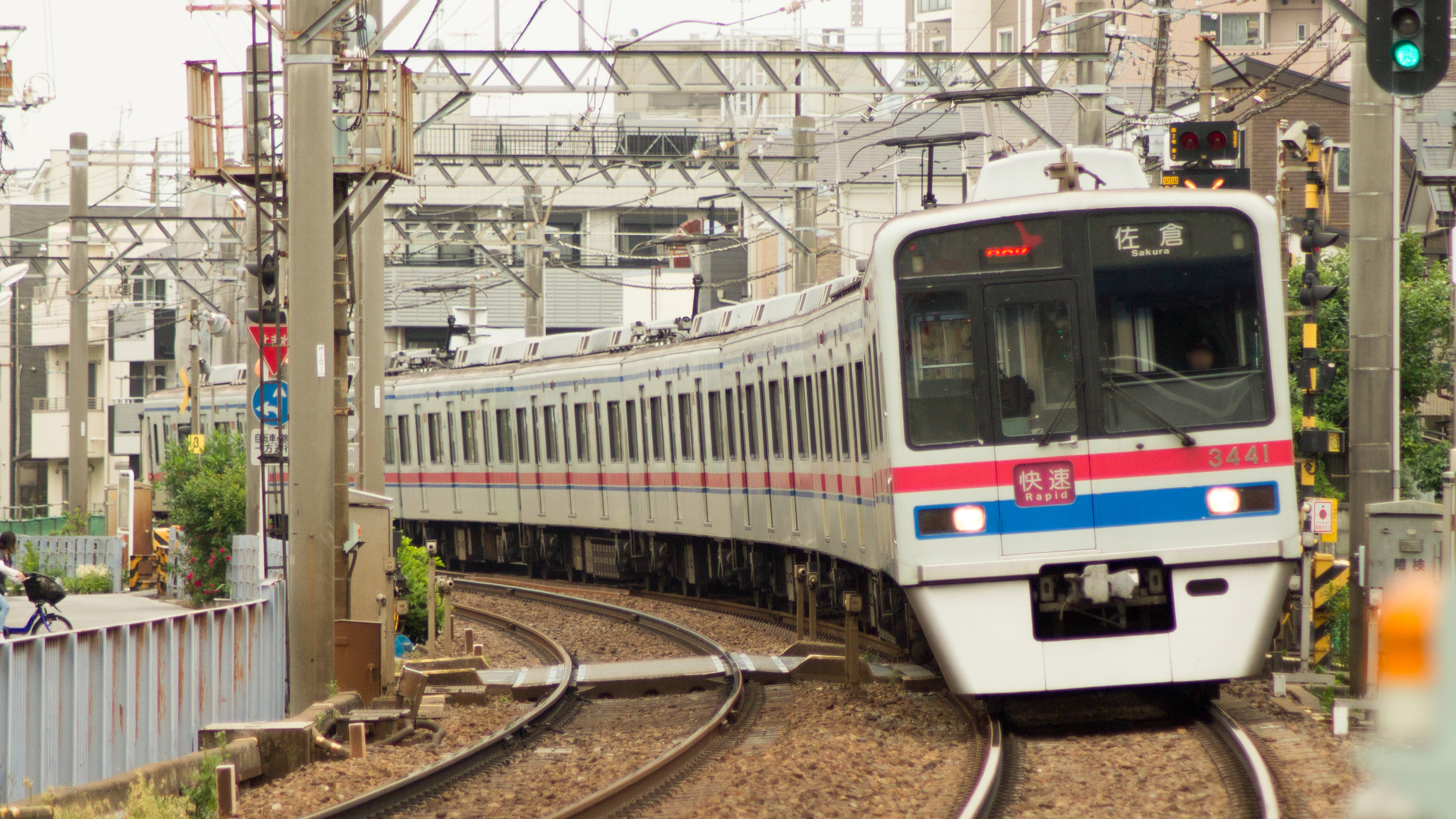
3400 series

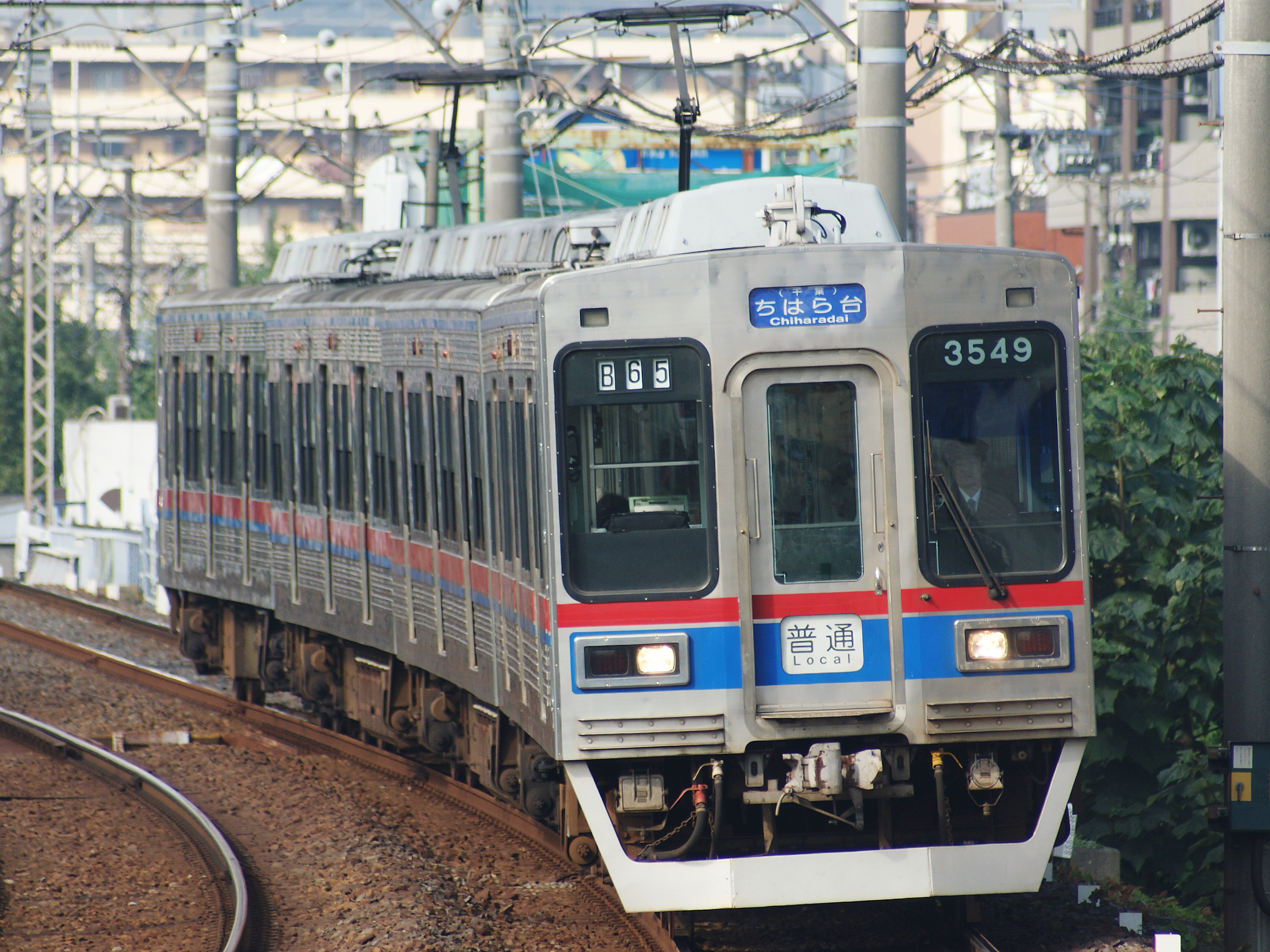
3500 series

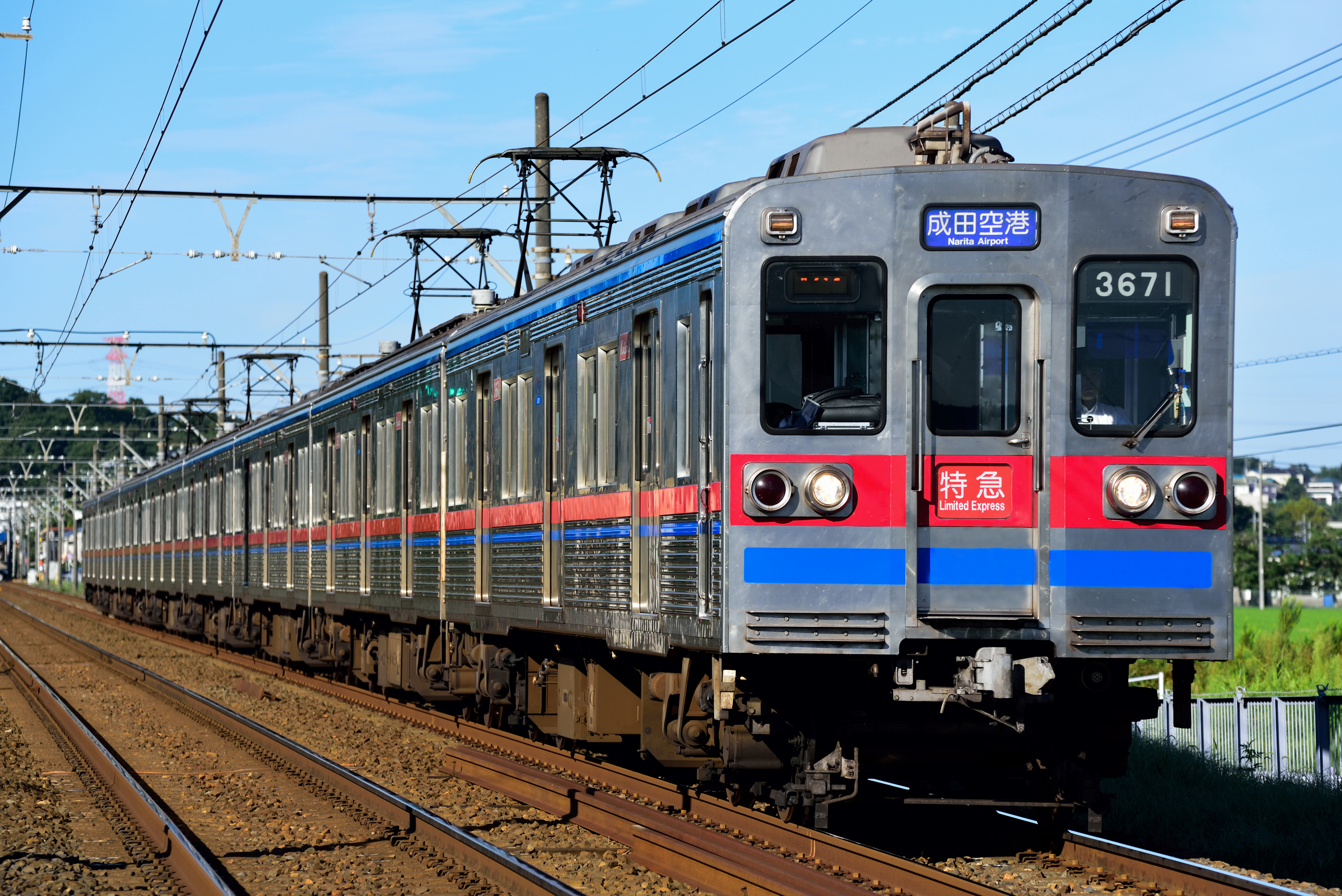
3600 series

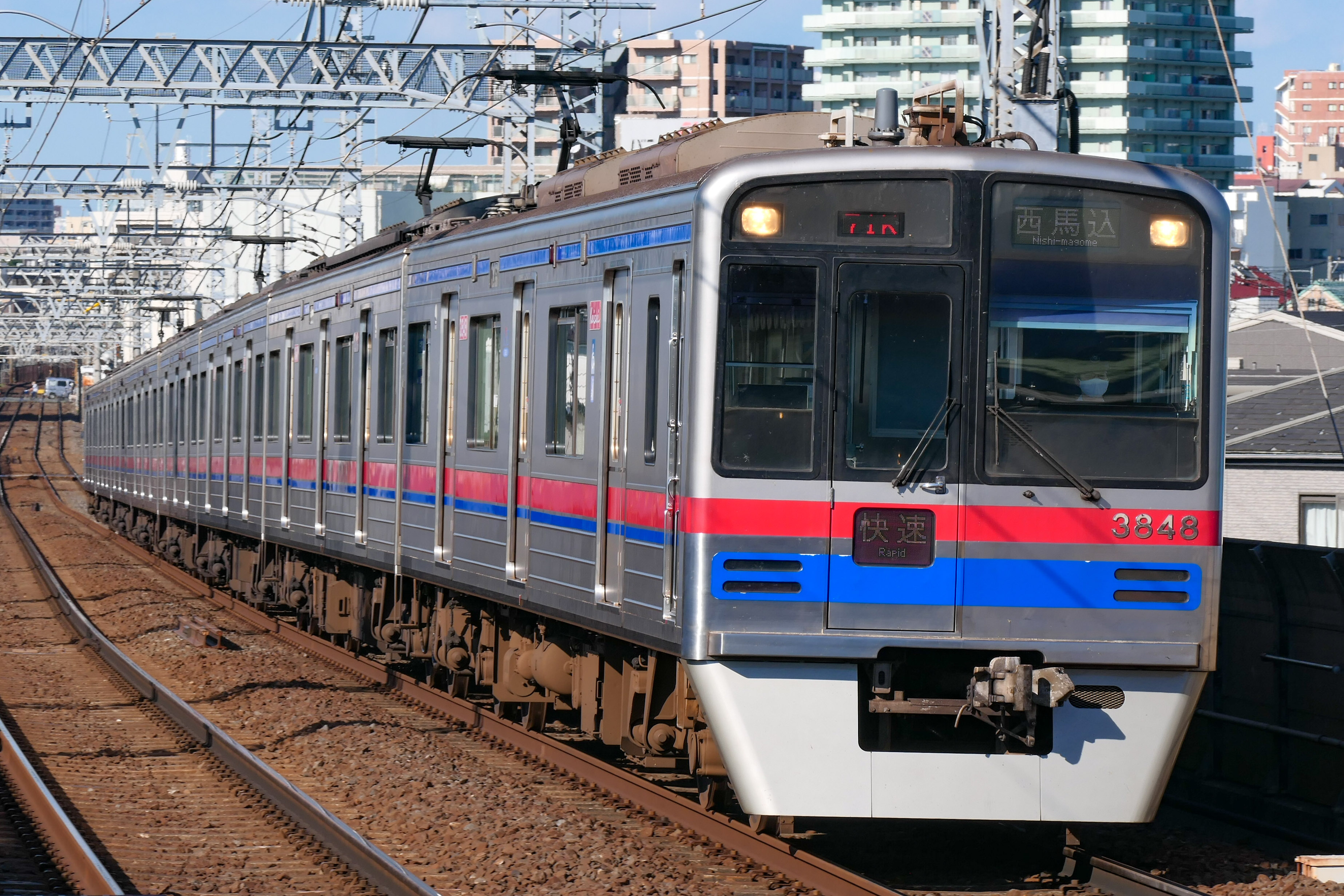
3700 series

Matsudo Line

Keisei acquired the following rolling stock due to the acquisition of the Shin-Keisei Railway on 1 April 2025:

- 8800 series
- 8900 series
- N800 series
- 80000 series

=== Former ===
==== Limited express ====
- 1500 series (1941–1987)
- 1600 series (1953–1981)
- AE series (1973–1993)
- AE100 series (1990–2016)
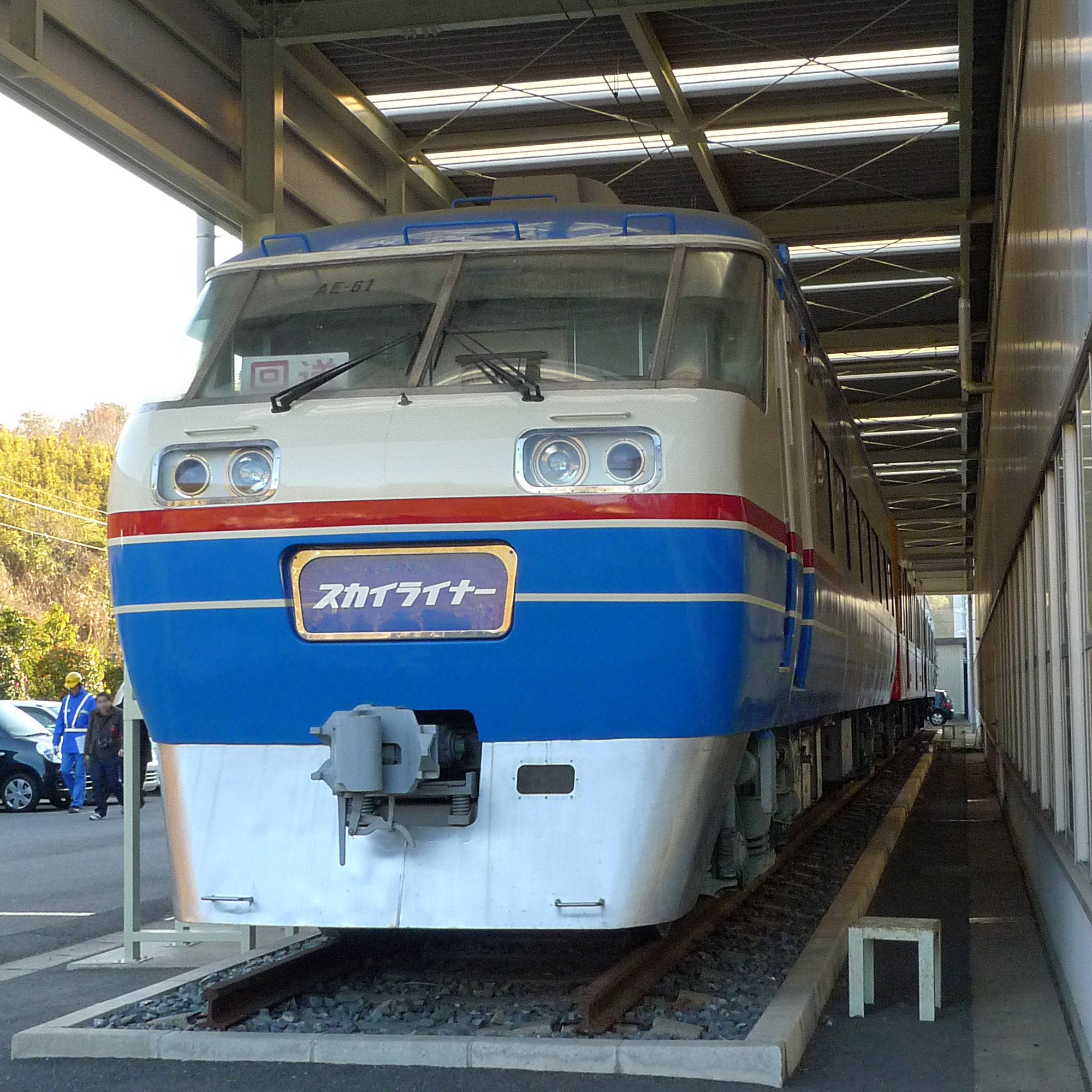
AE series

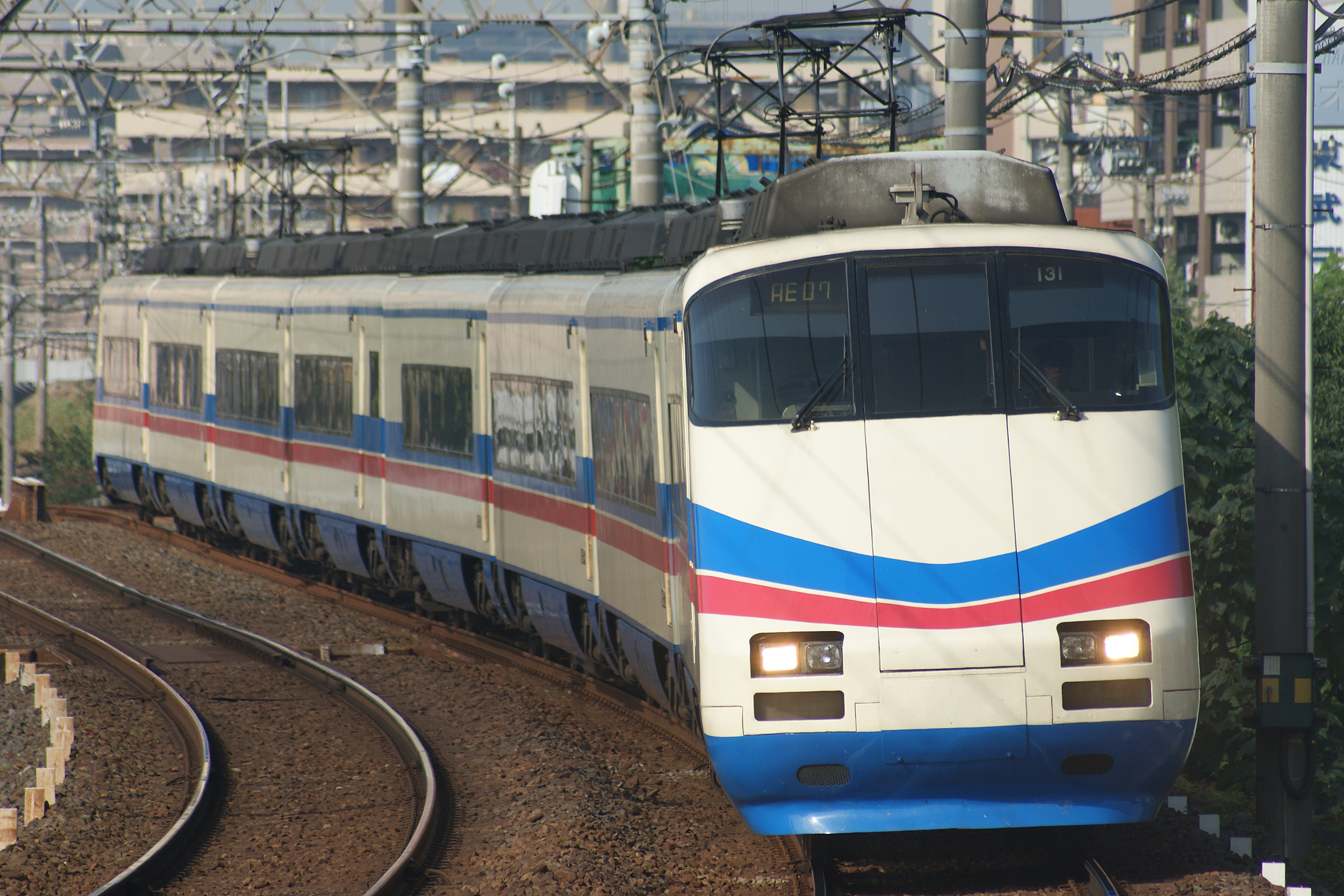
AE100 series

==== Commuter ====
- 1 series (1912-1927)
- 20 series (1921-1971)
- 33/39/45 series (1923-1978)
- 300 series (1955-1982)
- 100/126 series (1926-1987)
- 200/210/220/500/510 series (1931-1990)
- 210/2000/2100 series (1932-1985)
- 700/2200 series (1954-1982)
- 750/2250 series (1954-1973)
- 1100 series (1941-1987)
- 1500 series (1941-1987)
- 2000 series (1948-1990)
- 3000 series (1958-1991)
- 3050 series (1959-1995)
- 3100 series (1960-1998)
- 3150 series (1963-2001)
- 3200 series (1964-2007)
- 3300 series (1968-2015)
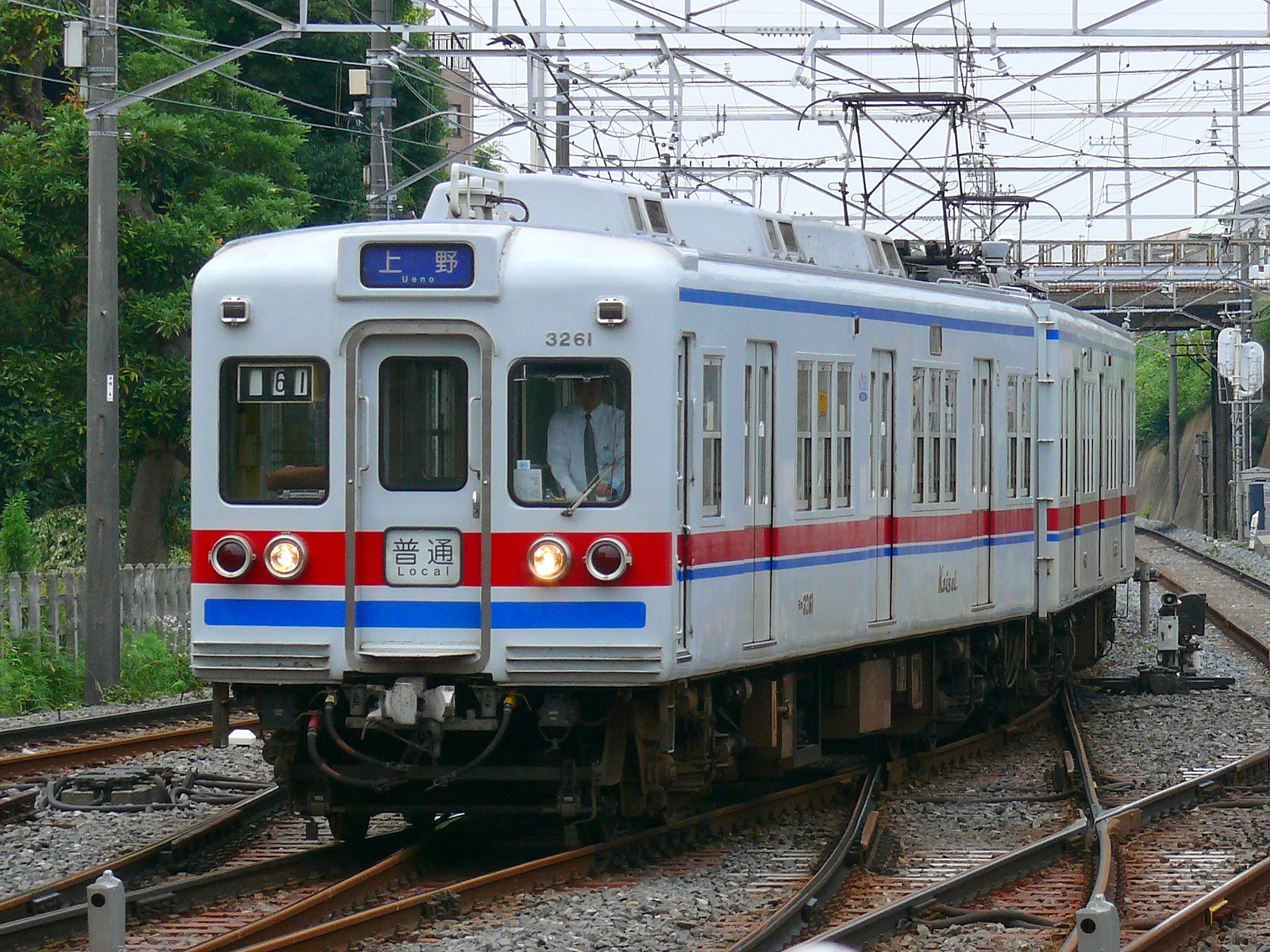
3200 series

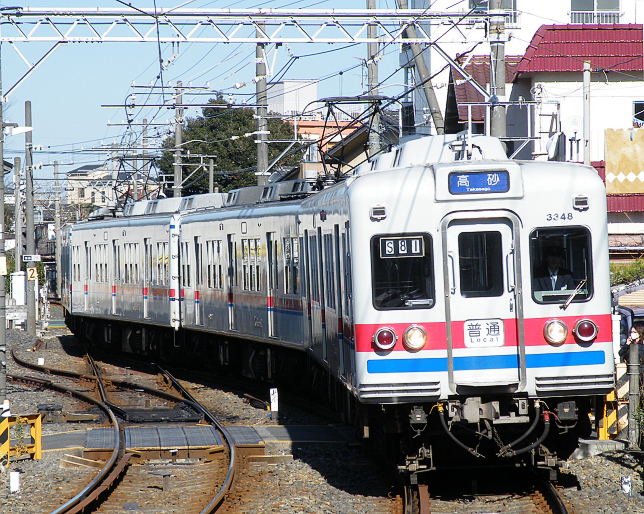
3300 series

== See also ==
- Tokyo Disneyland
- Keisei Bus
