= Keisei 3100 series =

Japanese train type

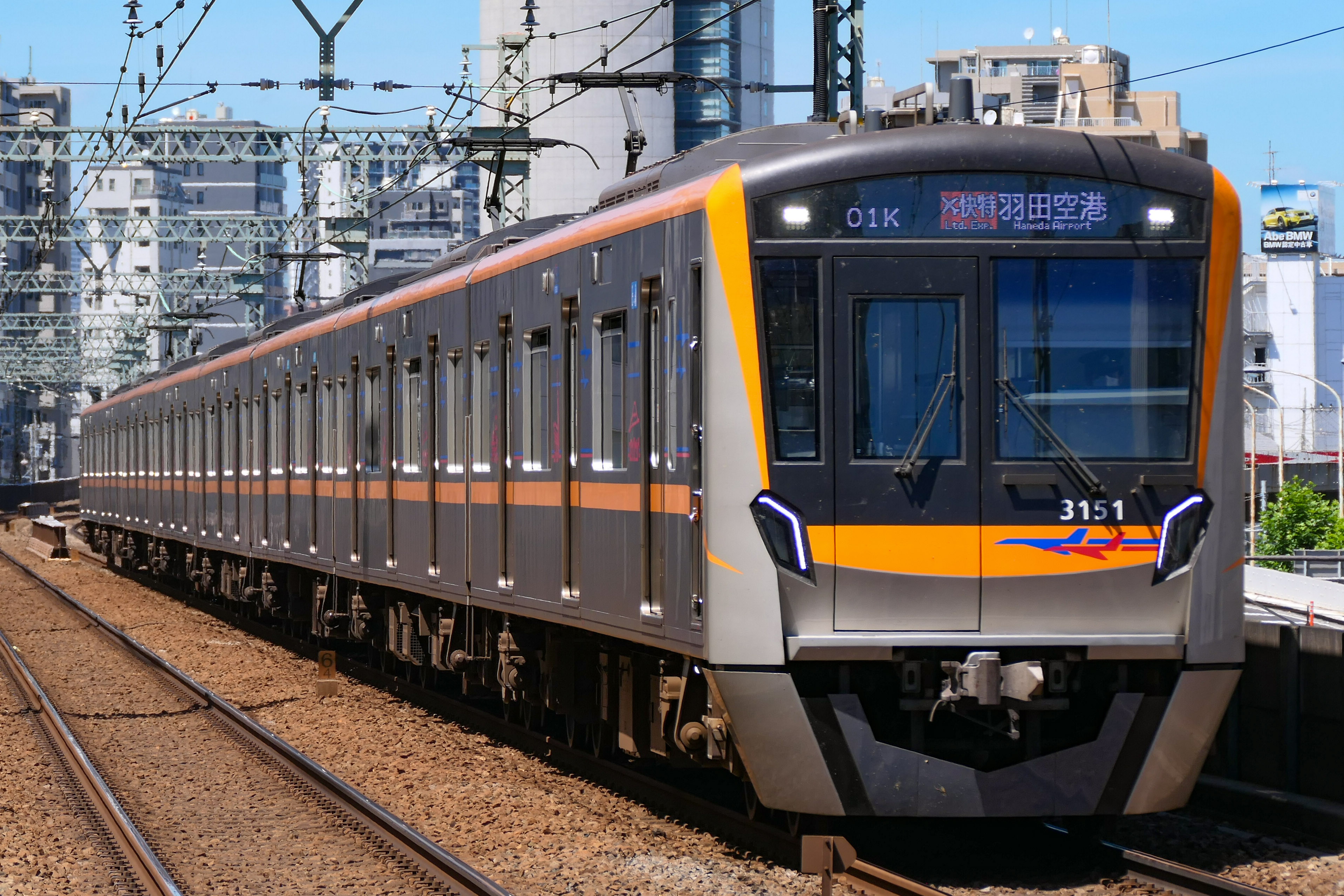
- Set 3151 in July 2021
- Manufacturers: J-TREC, Nippon Sharyo
- Constructed: 2019–
- Entered service: 26 October 2019
- Number built: 56 vehicles (7 sets)
- Number in service: 56 vehicles (7 sets)
- Formation: 8 cars per trainset
- Fleet numbers: 3151–
- Operator: Keisei Electric Railway
- Lines served: Keisei Main Line; Narita Sky Access Line; Keisei Oshiage Line; Toei Asakusa Line; Keikyu Main Line; Keikyu Airport Line; Keikyu Kurihama Line

Specifications
- Car body construction: Stainless steel
- Car length: 18,000 mm (59 ft 1 in)
- Width: 2,845 mm (9 ft 4 in)
- Height: 4,050 mm (13 ft 3 in)
- Doors: 3 pairs per side
- Maximum speed: 120 km/h (75 mph)
- Traction system: Toyo Denki RG6045A-M SiC hybrid IGBT–VVVF
- Traction motors: 24 × Toyo Denki TDK-6071-A 140 kW (188 hp) 3-phase AC induction motor
- Power output: 3.36 MW (4,506 hp)
- Acceleration: 0.97 m/s^{2} (2.2 mph/s)
- Deceleration: 1.1 m/s^{2} (2.5 mph/s) (service); 1.3 m/s^{2} (2.9 mph/s) (emergency)
- Electric systems: Overhead line, 1,500 V DC
- Current collection: Pantograph
- UIC classification: Bo'Bo' + Bo'Bo' + 2'2' + Bo'Bo' + Bo'Bo' + 2'2' + Bo'Bo' + Bo'Bo'
- Bogies: FS-583
- Safety system: C-ATS
- Track gauge: 1,435 mm (4 ft 8 1/2 in) standard gauge

The Keisei 3100 series (京成3100形) is an electric multiple unit (EMU) train type operated by the private railway operator Keisei Electric Railway on Narita Sky Access Line services. The top speed of Keisei 3100 series is 120 km/h (75 mph).

== Formation ==
As of 13 November 2021, the fleet consists of six 8-car sets which are formed as follows. Car 1 is at the Narita Airport end.

	← Narita Airport Keisei Ueno →							
Car No.	1	2	3	4	5	6	7	8
Designation	M2c	M1	T	M2	M1'	T	M1	M2c
Weight (t)	33.6	34.2	28.0	31.5	33.8	28.0	34.2	33.6
Capacity (total)	122	133	133	133	133	133	133	122

- Cars 2 and 7 are each equipped with two pantographs, and car 5 is equipped with one.

== Interior ==
The interior includes passenger information displays, security cameras, and wheelchair spaces. Seating accommodation consists of longitudinal seating throughout and includes foldable seats, in order to provide more space for luggage. In addition, the seat backs are approximately 170 millimetres (6.7 in) higher than those of the 3000 series.

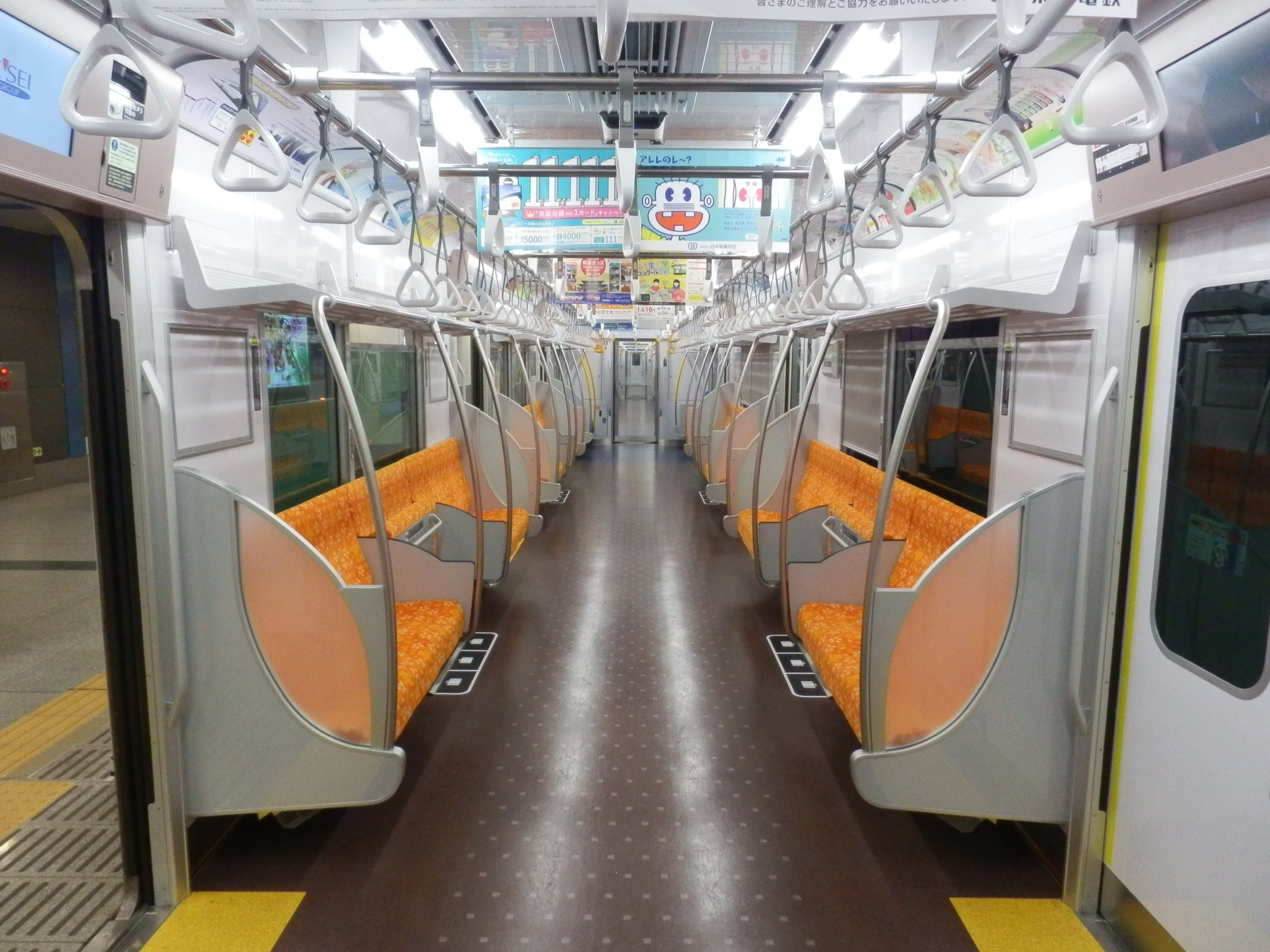
Interior view

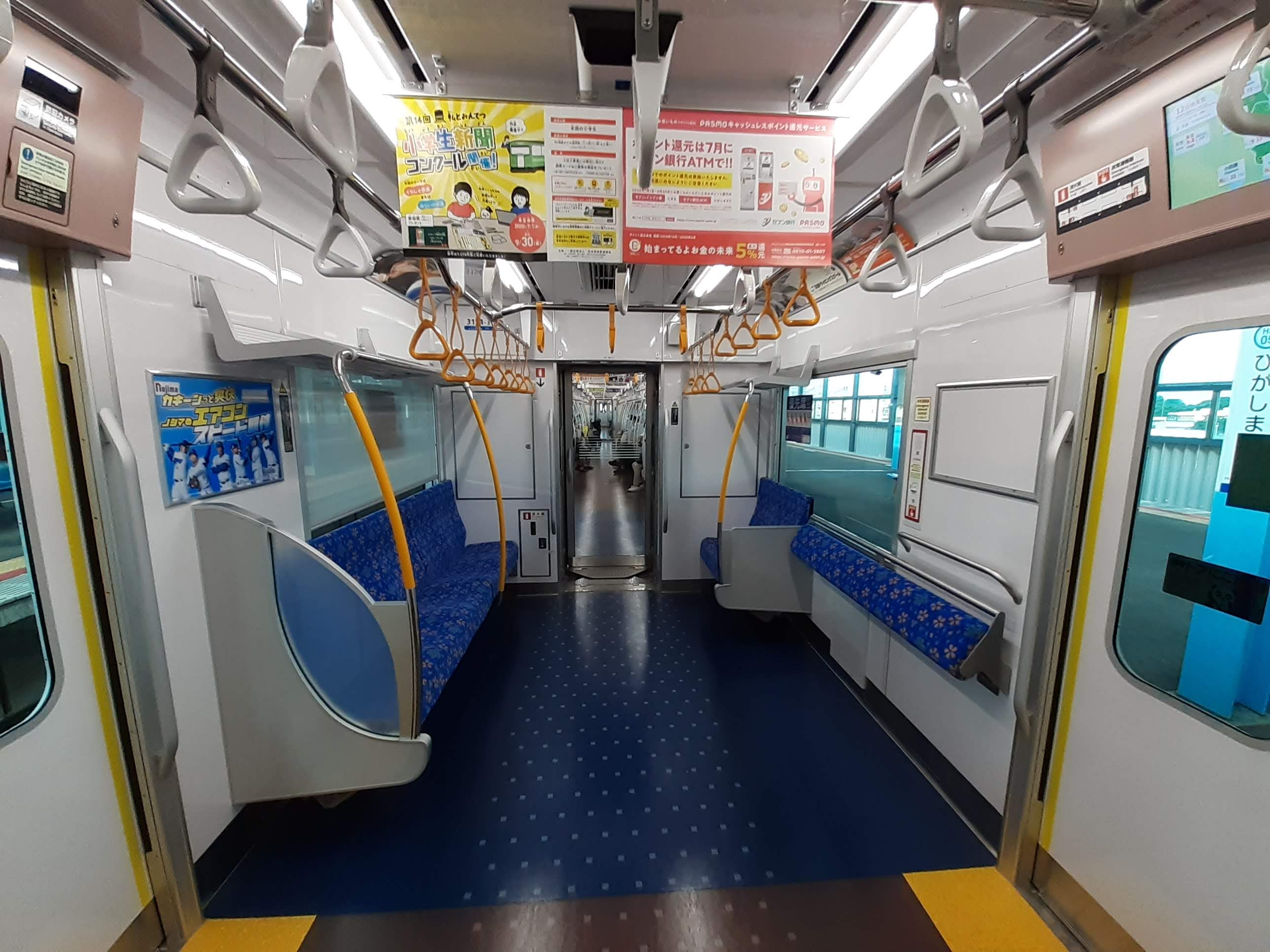
Priority seating with wheelchair/stroller space

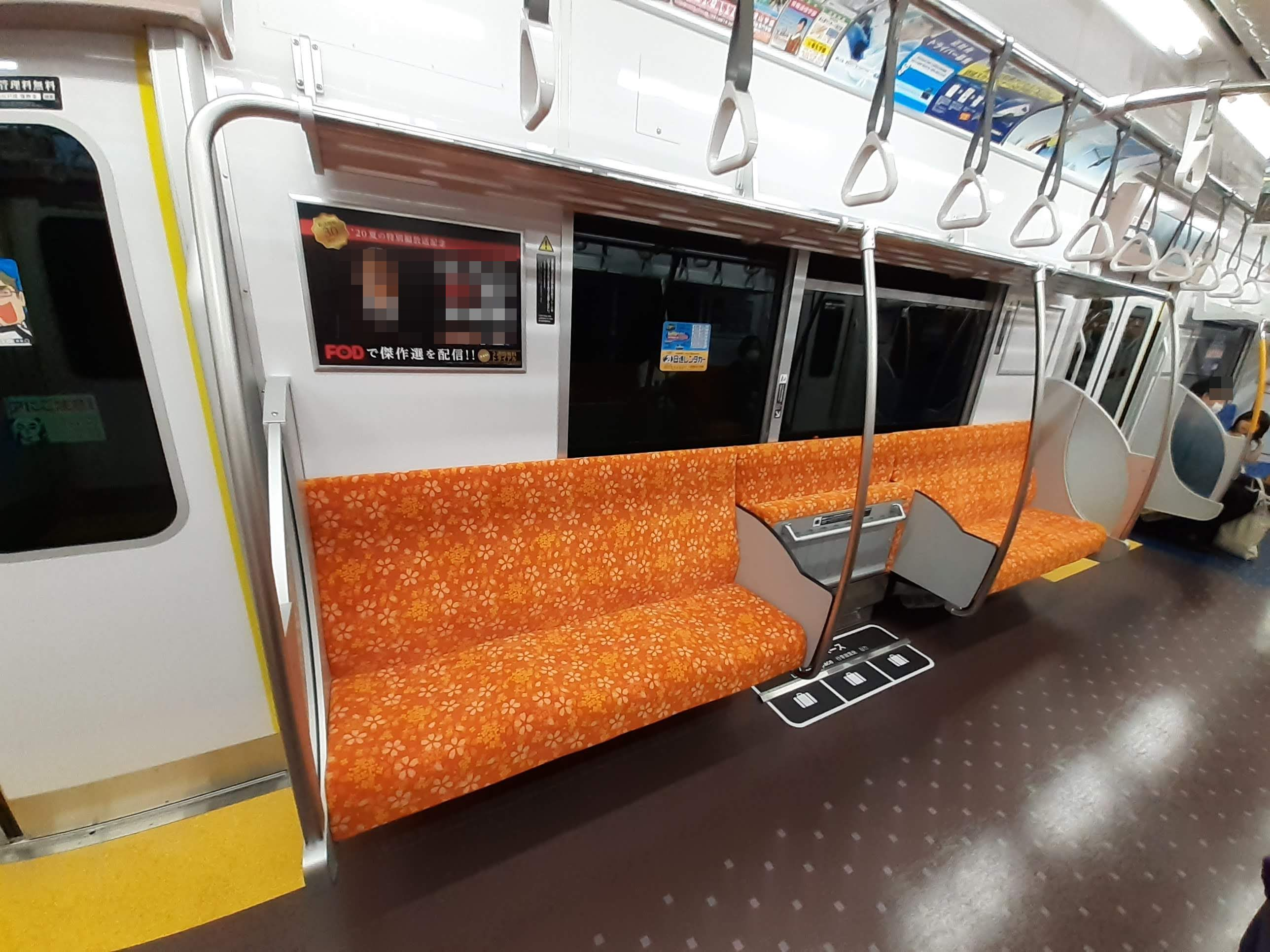
Partially foldable seat

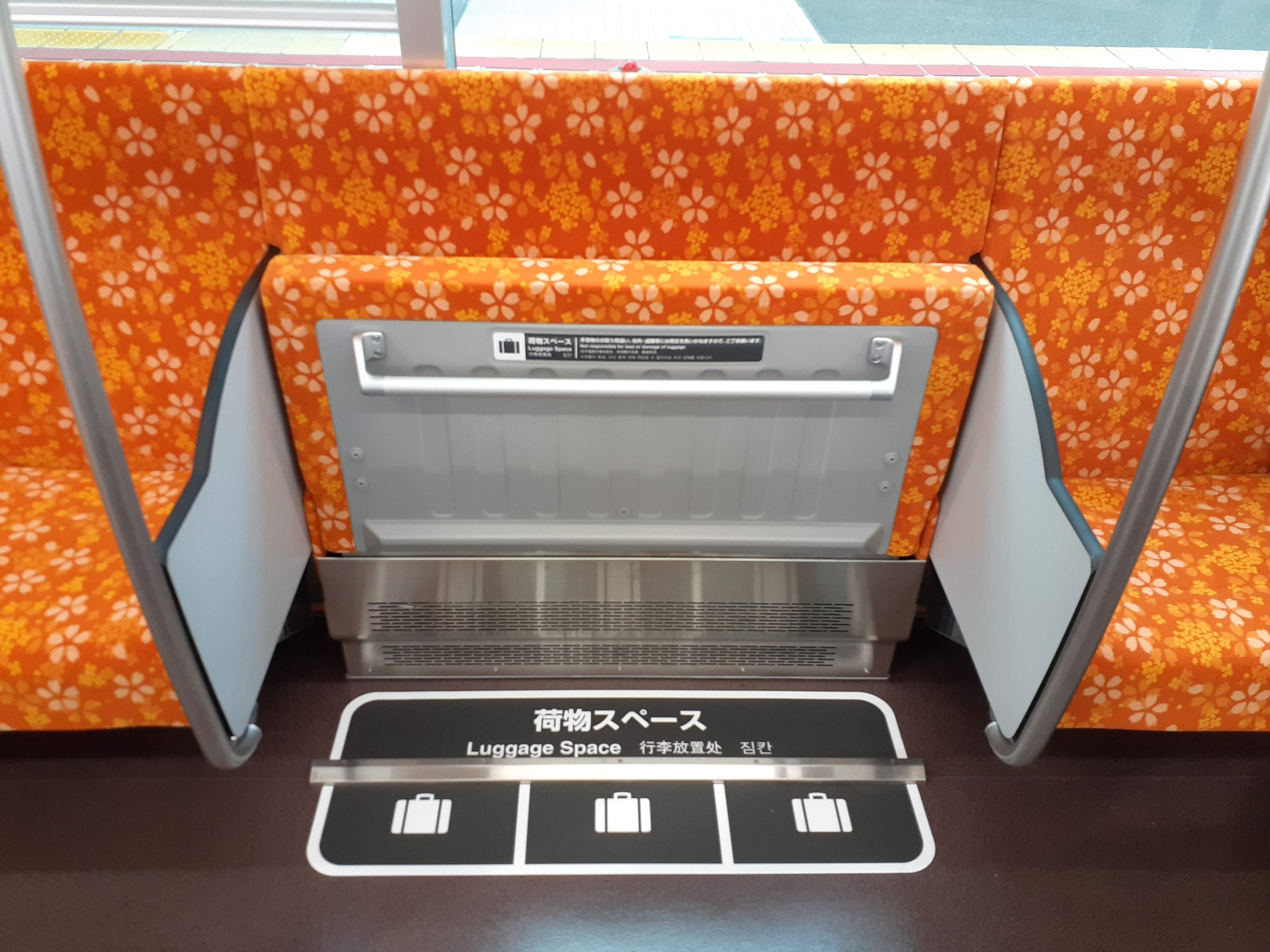
Partially foldable seat, up close. The vacant space left by the foldable portion is designated for luggage.

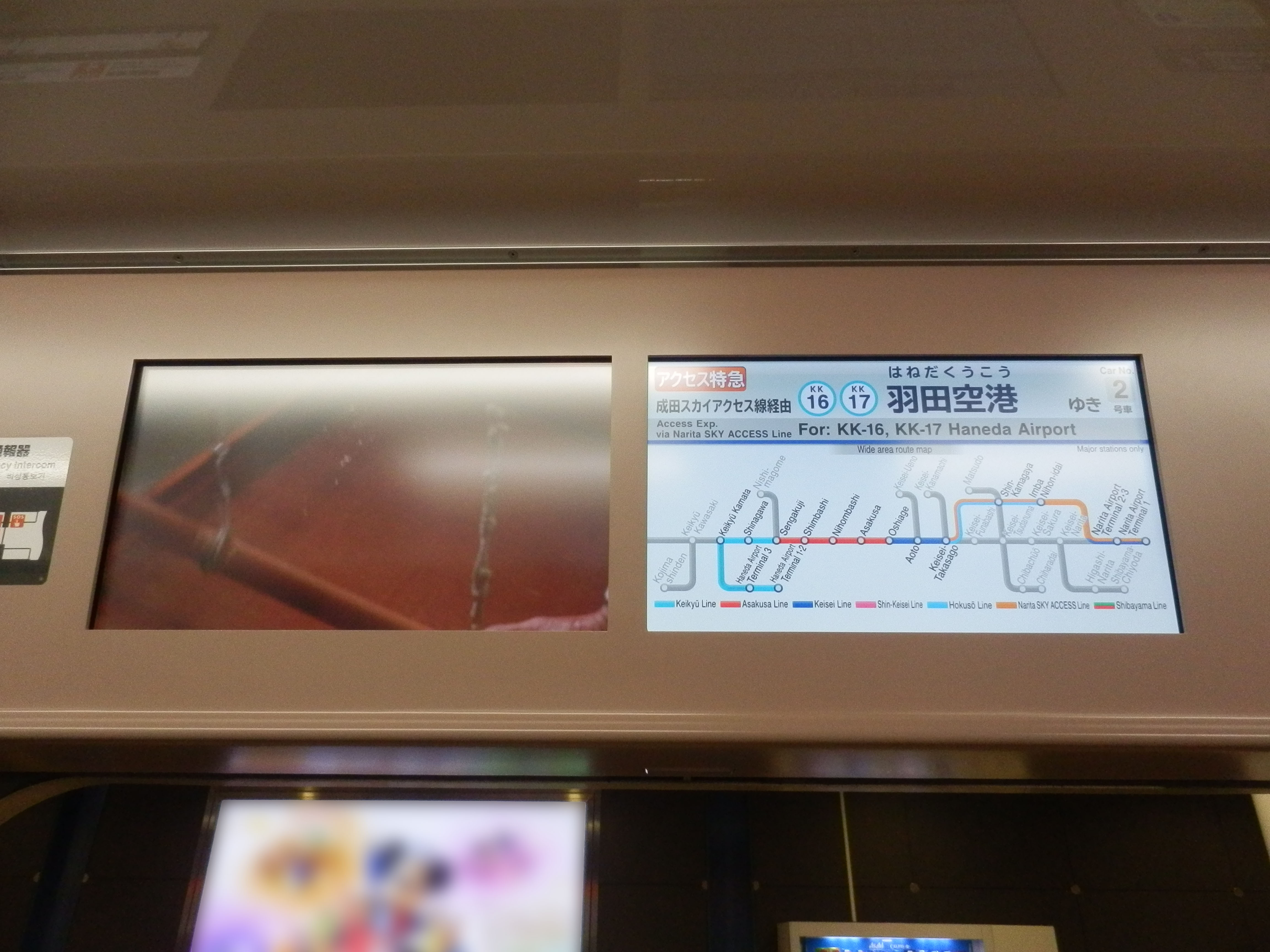
LCD passenger information display

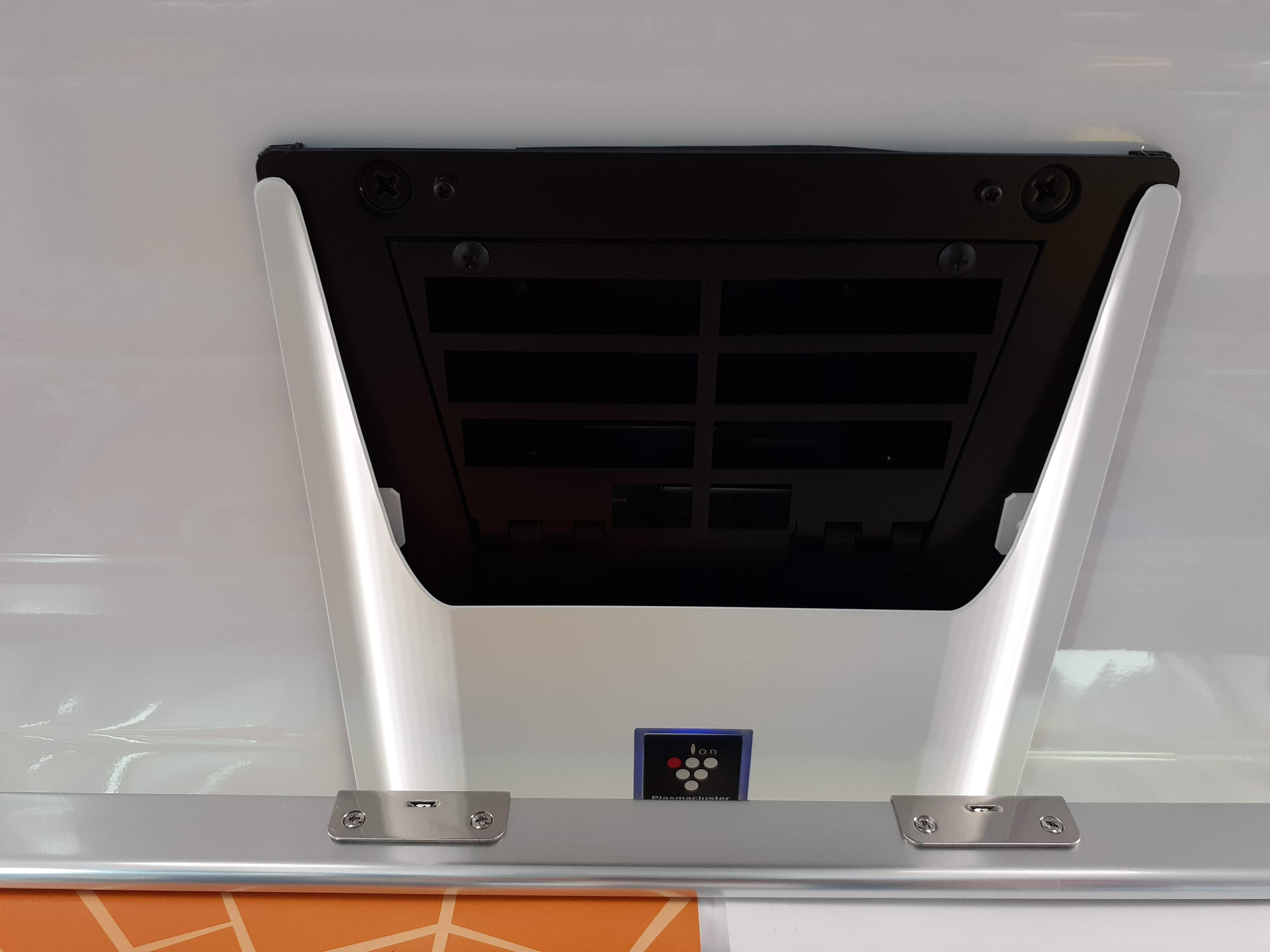
Plasmacluster generator

== History ==
Two eight-car sets were built in 2019. The trains entered service on 26 October 2019. Delivery of a third set, set 3153, began on 7 July 2020.

On 29 September 2021, it was announced by Keisei that new sets 3155 and 3156 were expected to enter service on 12 November and 30 September 2021, respectively. These two sets differ from preceding sets as they feature ladders at the end of cars 1 and 8 to allow for quick evacuation in the event of an emergency.

The 3100 series and Shin-Keisei 80000 series trains were jointly developed.

In early 2023, Keisei announced that an additional set would be purchased as part of its 2023 capital investment plan. This set entered service on 18 June 2023.
