= Keisei 3500 series =

Electric multiple unit train type operated by Keisei Electric Railway in Japan

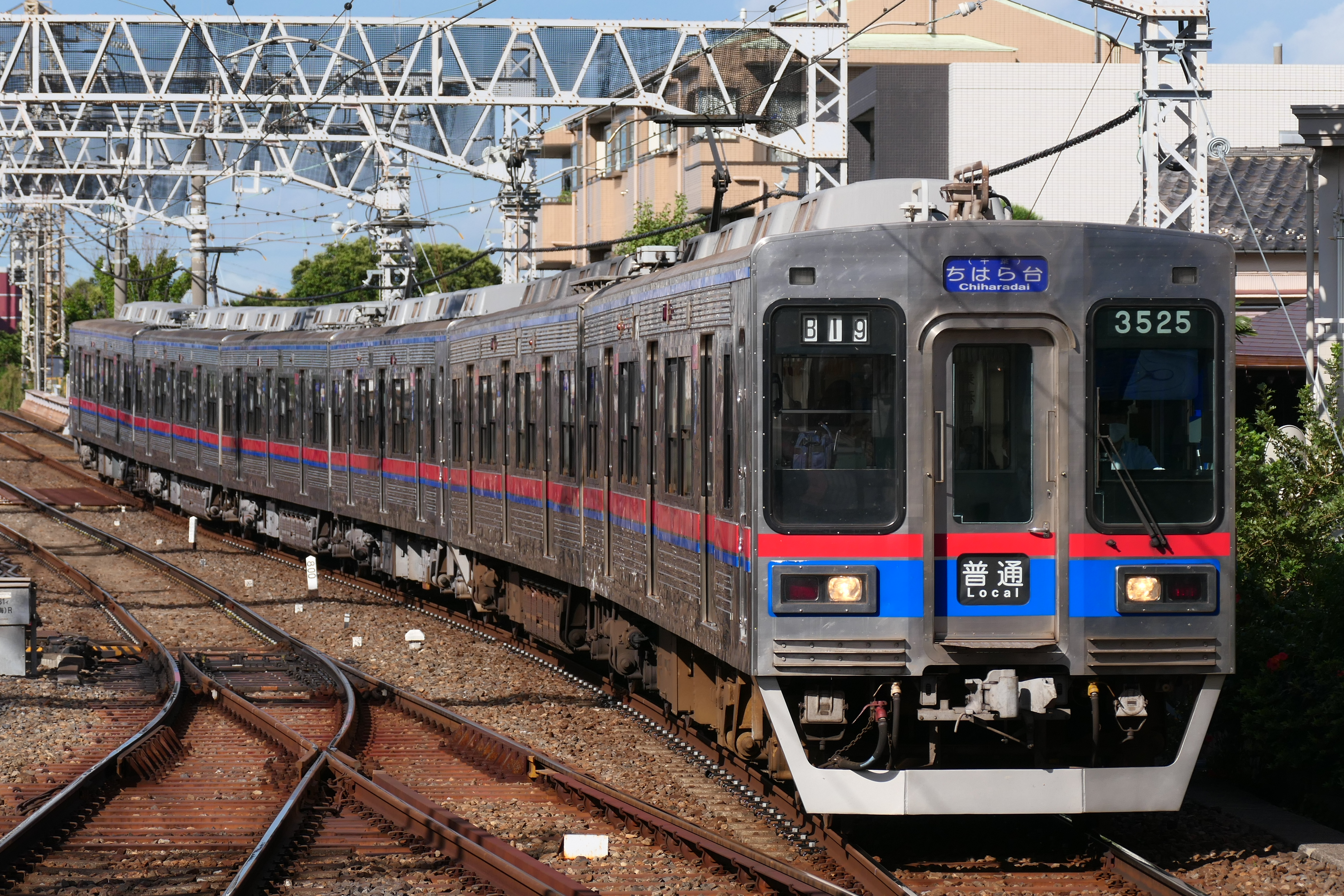
- Refurbished 3500 series six-car set 3525 in September 2020
- In service: 1972–present
- Manufacturers: Nippon Sharyo, Kawasaki Heavy Industries and Tokyu Car Corporation
- Constructed: 1972–1982
- Entered service: December 1972
- Refurbished: 1996–2001
- Number built: 96 vehicles (24 sets)
- Number in service: 42 vehicles (8 sets) (Keisei Electric Railway); 4 vehicles (1 set) (Shibayama Railway)
- Formation: 8/6/4 cars per set
- Operators: Keisei Electric Railway, Shibayama Railway
- Lines served: Keisei Main Line; Toei Asakusa Line; Keikyu Main Line

Specifications
- Car body construction: Stainless steel
- Doors: 3 pairs per side
- Maximum speed: 110 km/h (70 mph)
- Traction system: Resistor control
- Electric system: 1,500 V DC overhead catenary
- Current collection: Single-arm pantograph
- Track gauge: 1,435 mm (4 ft 8 1/2 in)

The Keisei 3500 series (京成3500形) is a commuter electric multiple unit (EMU) train type operated by the private railway operator Keisei Electric Railway in the Tokyo area of Japan since 1972. It was the operator’s first stainless steel train type to be introduced.

== Operations ==
The 3500 series sets operate on the Keisei Main Line. The eight-car sets were also used on Toei Asakusa Line and Keikyu line inter-running services until they were split into individual four-car sets in 2014, although the unrefurbished sets were not capable of operating on Keikyu lines.

== Formations ==
Originally built as 24 four-car sets, the fleet was subsequently reformed into eight-, six-, and four-car sets.

As of January 2024, the fleet consists of five six-car sets and three four-car sets, as well as one four-car set operated by Shibayama Railway.

=== 6-car sets ===
The six-car sets are formed as shown below. All cars are motored.

Designation	M2	M1'	M2	M1'	M1'	M2

Designation	M2	M1'	M1'	M2	M1'	M2

The M1' cars are each fitted with one single-arm pantograph.

=== 4-car sets ===
The four-car sets are formed as shown below. All cars are motored.

Designation	M2	M1'	M1'	M2

The M1' cars are each fitted with one single-arm pantograph.

=== 8-car sets ===
Four eight-car sets were formed as shown below. All cars were motored.

Designation	M2	M1'	M1'	M2	M2	M1'	M1'	M2

The M1' cars were each fitted with one single-arm pantograph.

== Interior ==
Seating consists of longitudinal bench seating throughout.

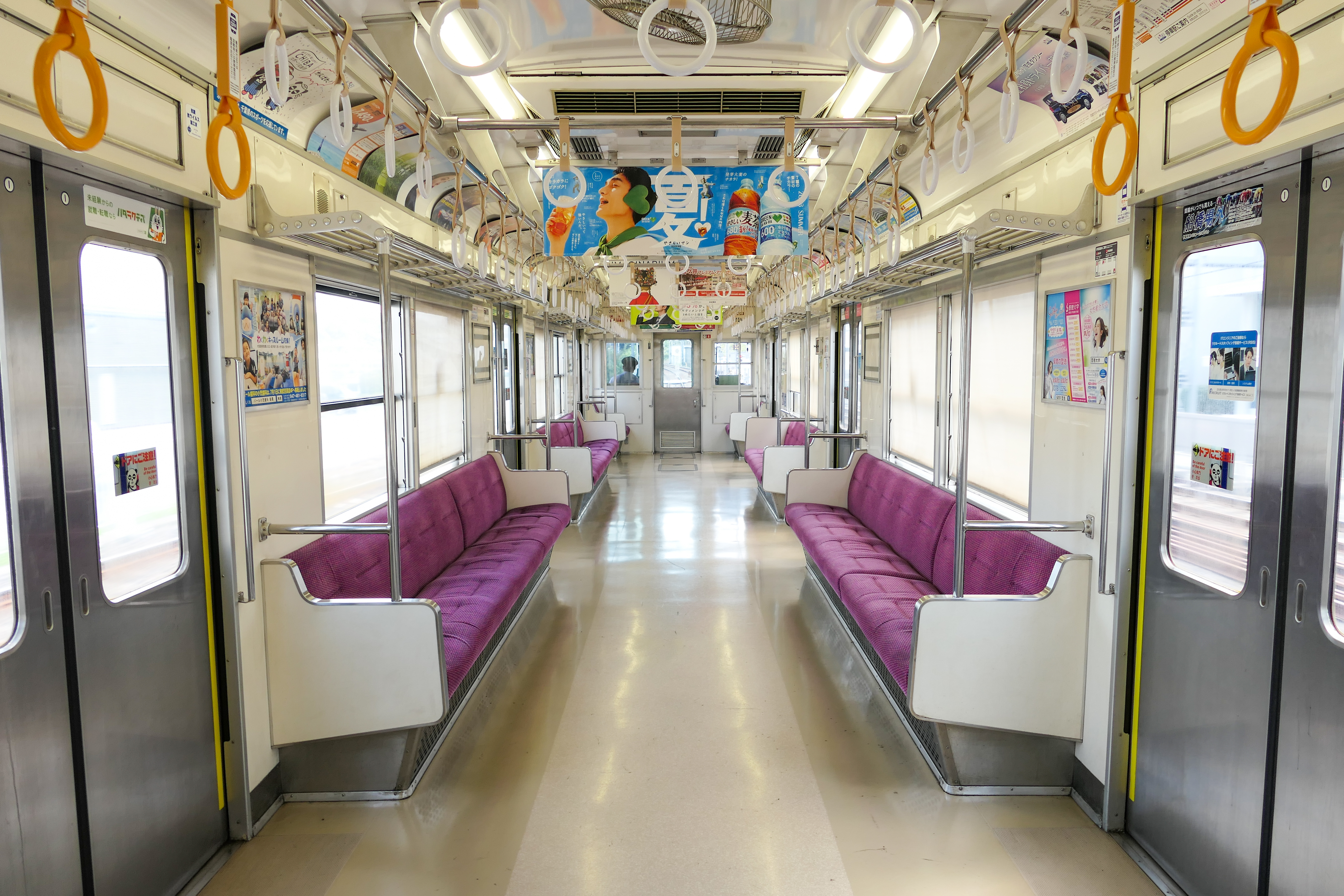
Interior view of a refurbished set

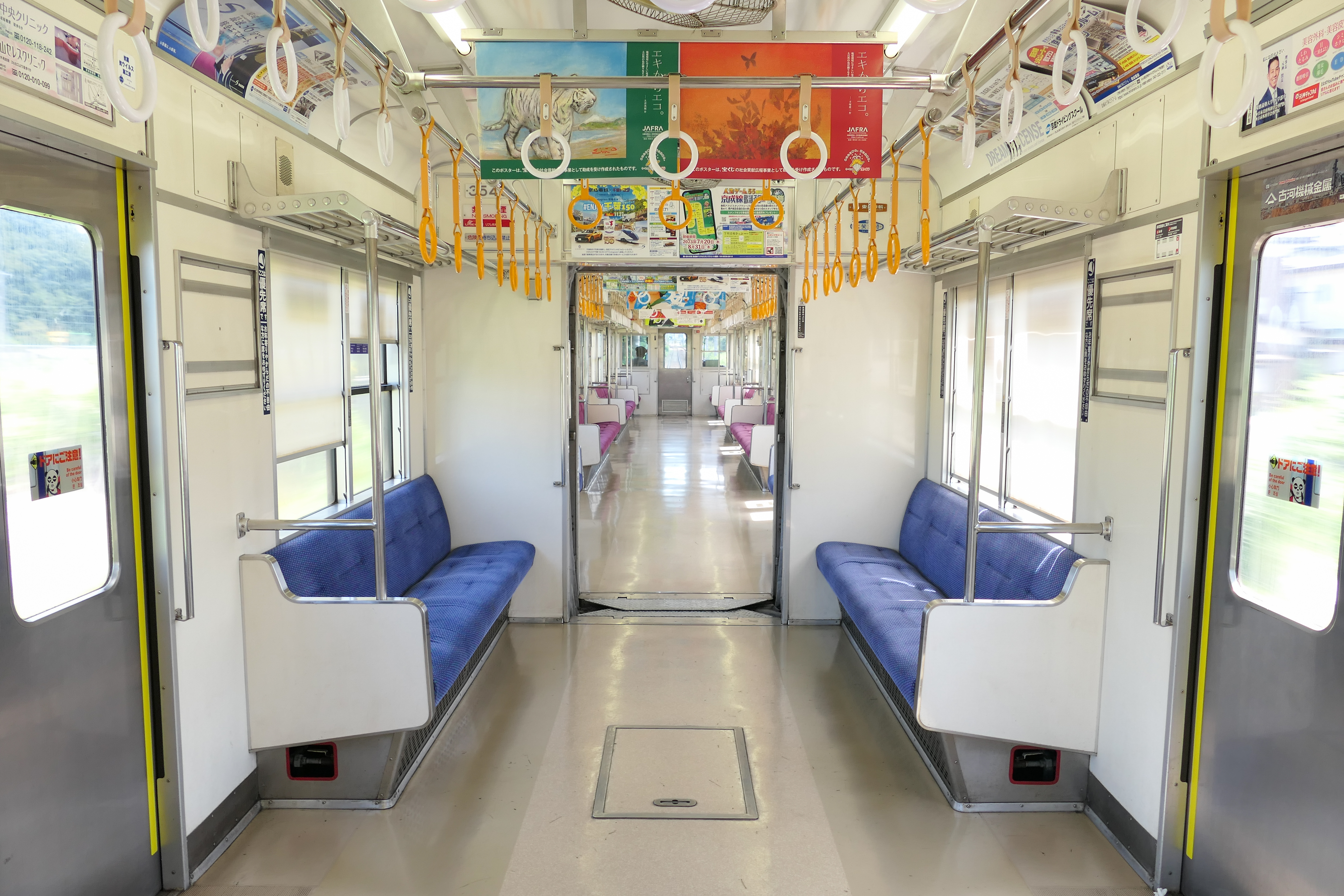
Priority seating of a refurbished set

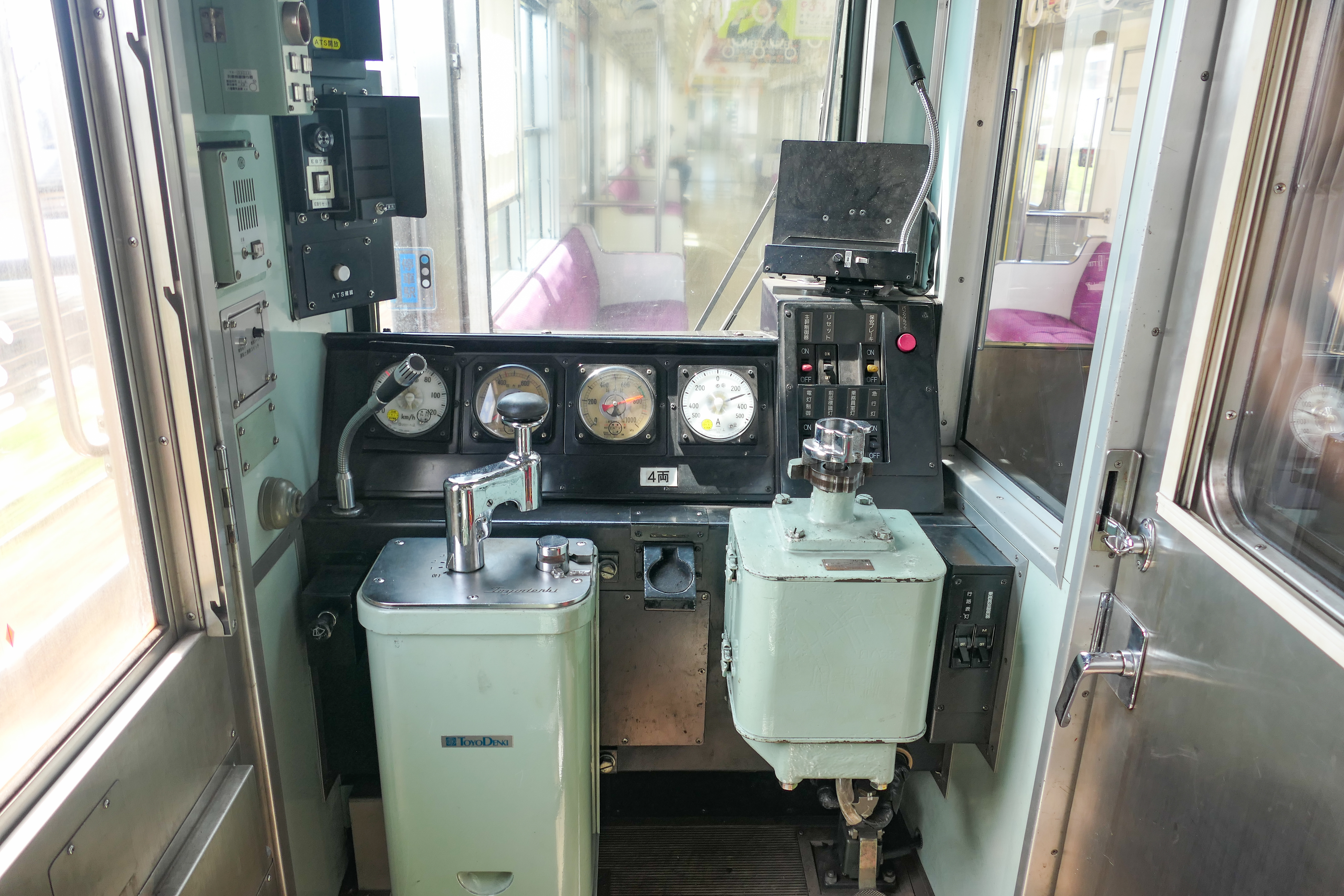
Driver's cab of a refurbished set

== History ==
The first 3500 series trains entered service in December 1972.

Major refurbishment of the fleet commenced in 1996, with a total of 56 vehicles refurbished by 2001. Refurbishment involved redesigned front ends with square lights instead of round and upgraded interiors.

Special farewell tours were staged for the last remaining unrefurbished 3500 series set, 3588, on 25 and 26 February 2017.

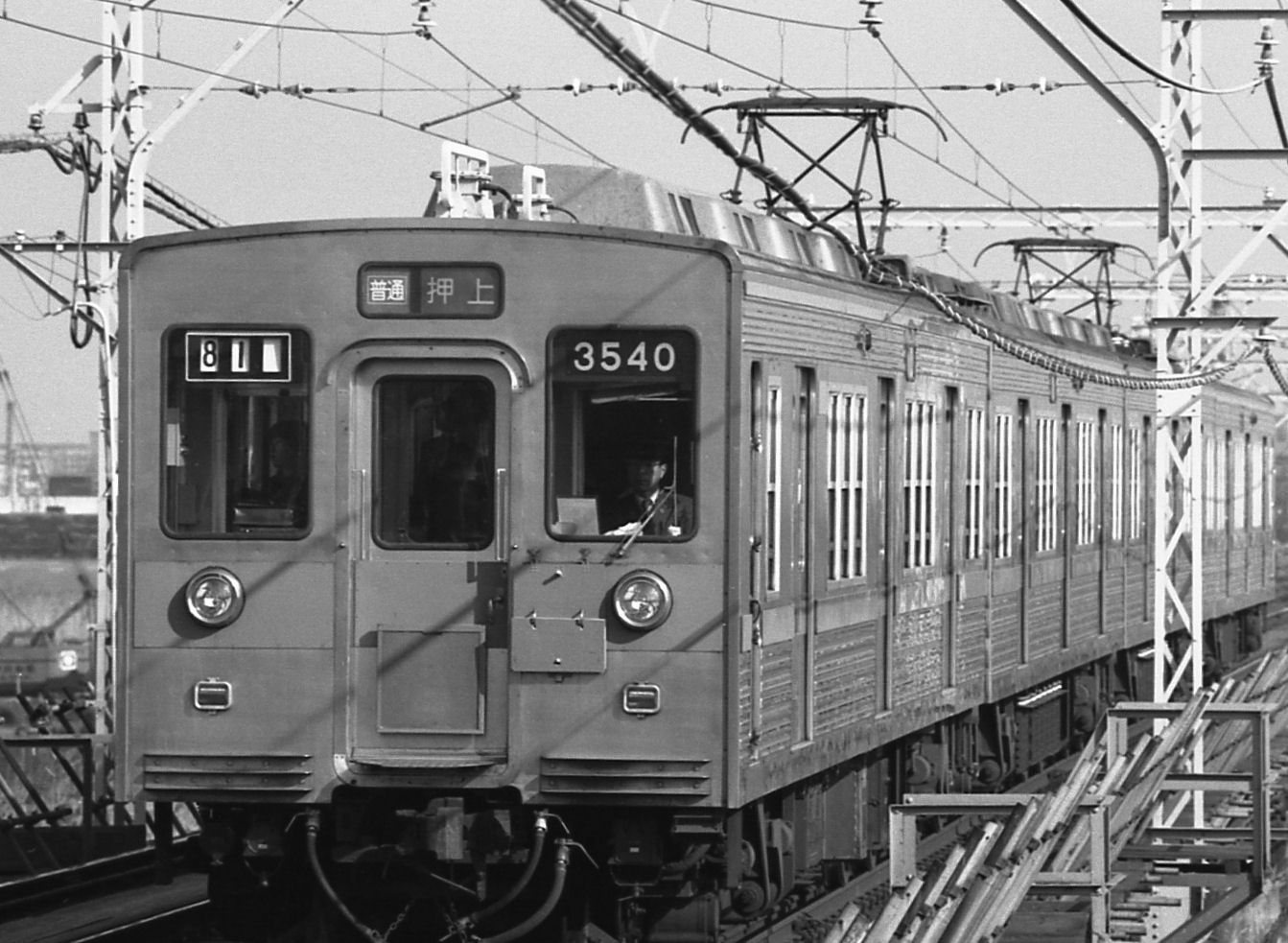
Four-car set 3540 in December 1984

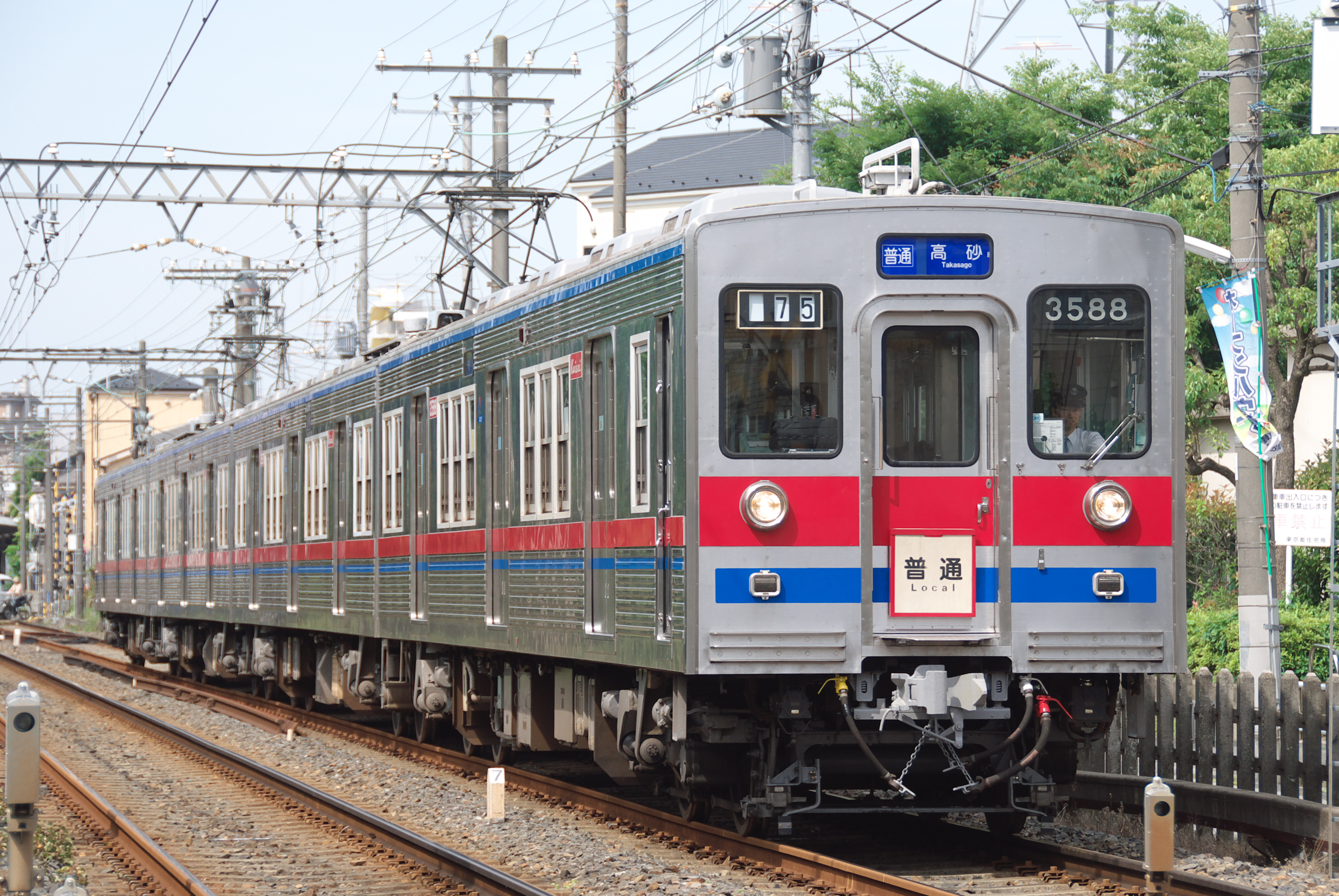
Unrefurbished 3500 series four-car set 3588 in June 2009

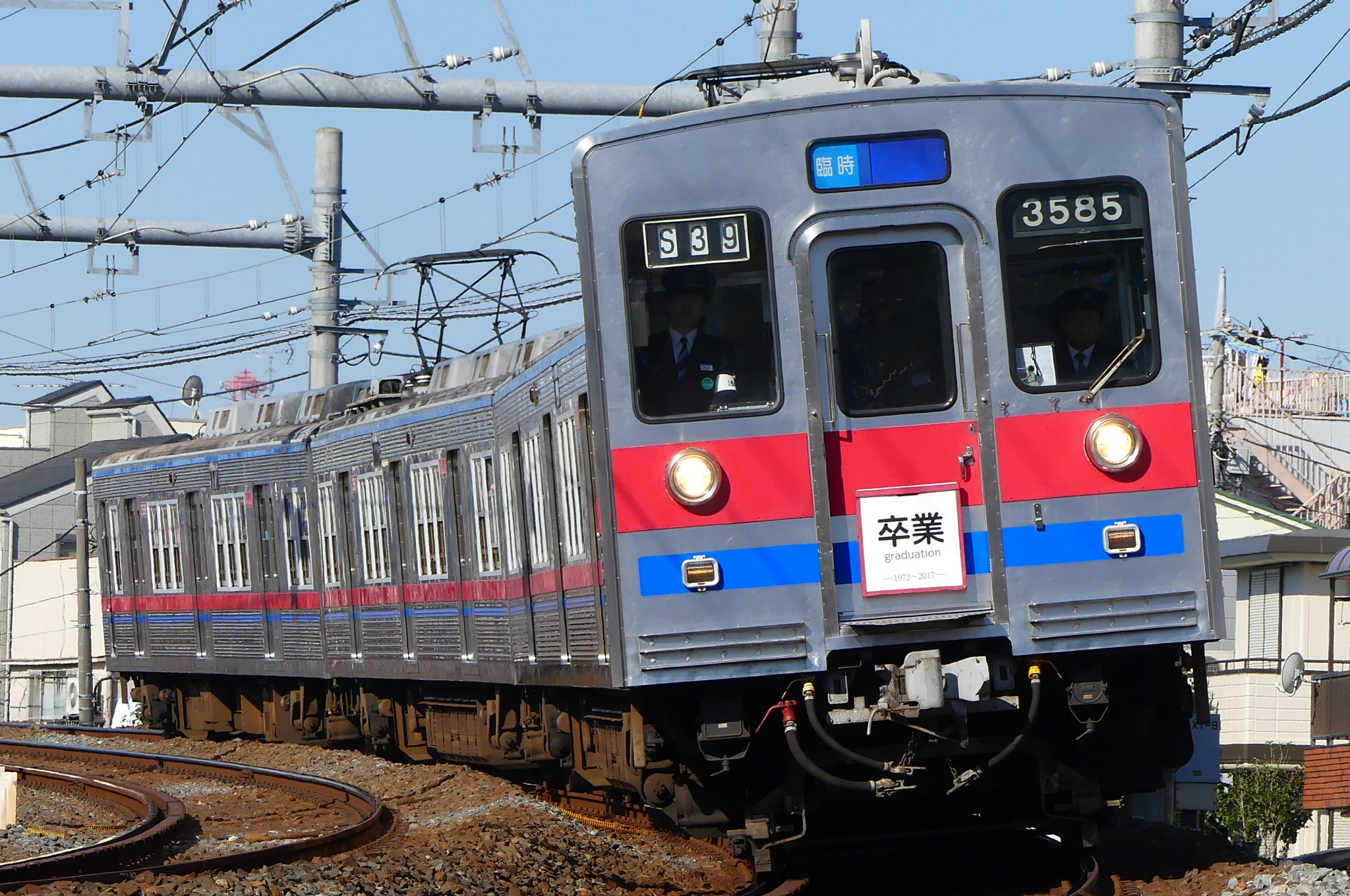
The last unrefurbished 3500 series set, 3588, on a special farewell run in February 2017

=== Transfer to Shibayama Railway ===
On 1 April 2013, four-car set 3540 was transferred to Shibayama Railway. The set initially operated in the standard Keisei livery after the transfer, but it was repainted with green and red stripes in April 2022.

On 25 February 2026, Shibayama Railway announced its plans to withdraw its 3500 series set at the end of March of that year. Shibayama Railway announced on 13 March that it would be replaced by a 3600 series four-car set from 1 April.

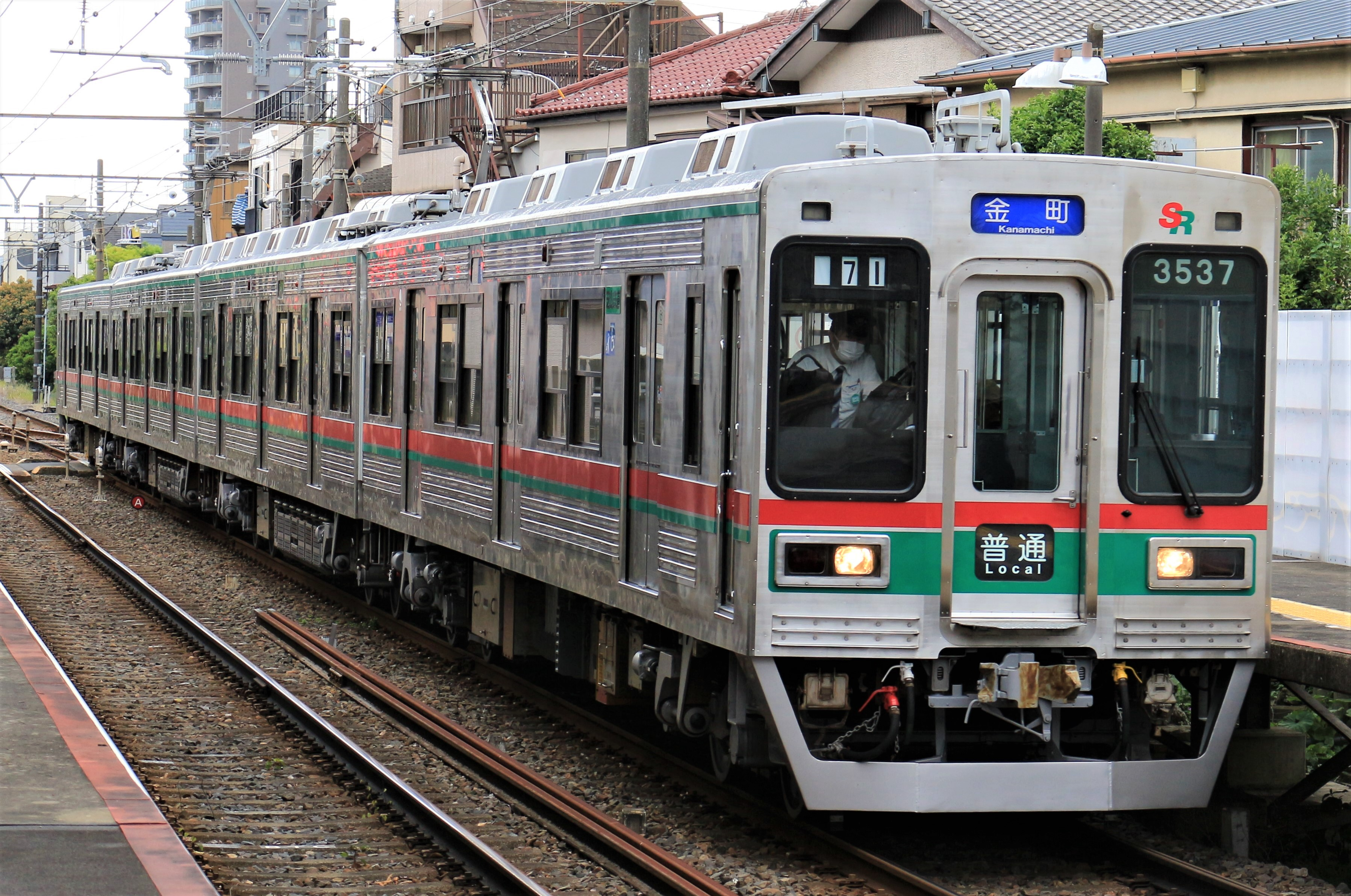
Shibayama Railway set 3540 in May 2022
