= Akiyama Station =

Railway station in Matsudo, Chiba Prefecture, Japan

HS04 Akiyama Station 秋山駅
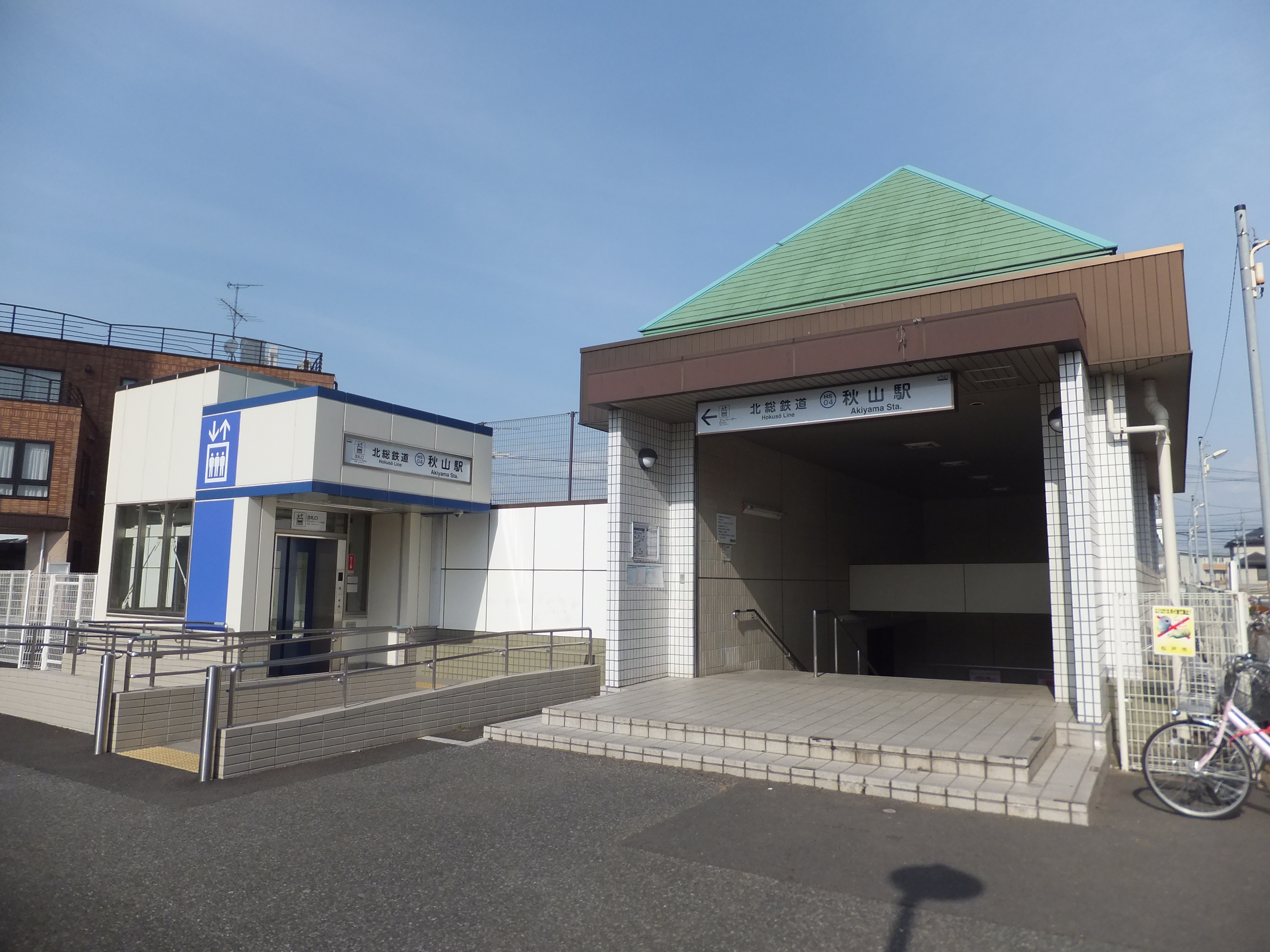
- Akiyama Station, April 2012

General information
- Location: 2-chome Akiyama, Matsudo-shi, Chiba-ken 270-2223; Japan
- Coordinates: 35.7653°N 139.9306°E
- Operator: Hokusō Railway
- Line: Hokusō Line
- Platforms: 2 side platforms

Other information
- Station code: HS04
- Website: Official website

History
- Opened: 31 March 1991

Passengers
- FY2018: 7,713

Services
Preceding station	Hokusō Railway	Following station
Kita-Kokubun HS03 towards Keisei Takasago	Hokusō Line Local	Higashi-Matsudo HS05 towards Imba Nihon-idai
Location
- Location within Chiba Prefecture Location within Japan

Akiyama Station (秋山駅, Akiyama-eki) is a passenger railway station in the city of Matsudo, Chiba, Japan, operated by the third sector Hokusō Railway.

== Lines ==
Akiyama Station is served by the Hokusō Line and is located 6.2 kilometers from the terminus of the line at Keisei-Takasago.

== Station layout ==
This station consists of two opposed side platforms serving two tracks, located in a cutting below ground level, with the station building at ground level above.

=== Platforms ===
1	■ Hokusō Line	for Keisei-Takasago, Oshiage, Ueno, Shinagawa, and Haneda Airport Domestic Terminal
2	■ Hokusō Line	for Higashi-Matsudo, Shin-Kamagaya , Imba Nihon-idai, and Narita Airport

== History ==
Akiyama Station was opened on 31 March 1991. On 17 July 2010 a station numbering system was introduced to the Hokusō Line, with the station designated HS04.

== Passenger statistics ==
In fiscal 2018, the station was used by an average of 7713 passengers daily.

== Surrounding area ==
- Chiba Prefectural Matsugo Koyo High School
- Matsudo Minami High School
- National Route 464

== Buses ==
Bus stop	No	Via	Destination	Company	Note
Matsudo Shin-Keisei Bus	16	Ōhashi・Wakasane	Matsudo Station East Exit	Matsudo Shin-Keisei Bus	
Matsudo Shin-Keisei Bus	16	Non stop	Rikadai Danchi	Matsudo Shin-Keisei Bus	
Matsudo Shin-Keisei Bus	16	Rikadai Danchi・Sports Center	Ichiritsu Higashi-Matsudo Hospital	Matsudo Shin-Keisei Bus	
