= Funabashi Keimei High School =

High school in Chiba, Japan

Coordinates: 35.7315°N 139.9845°E

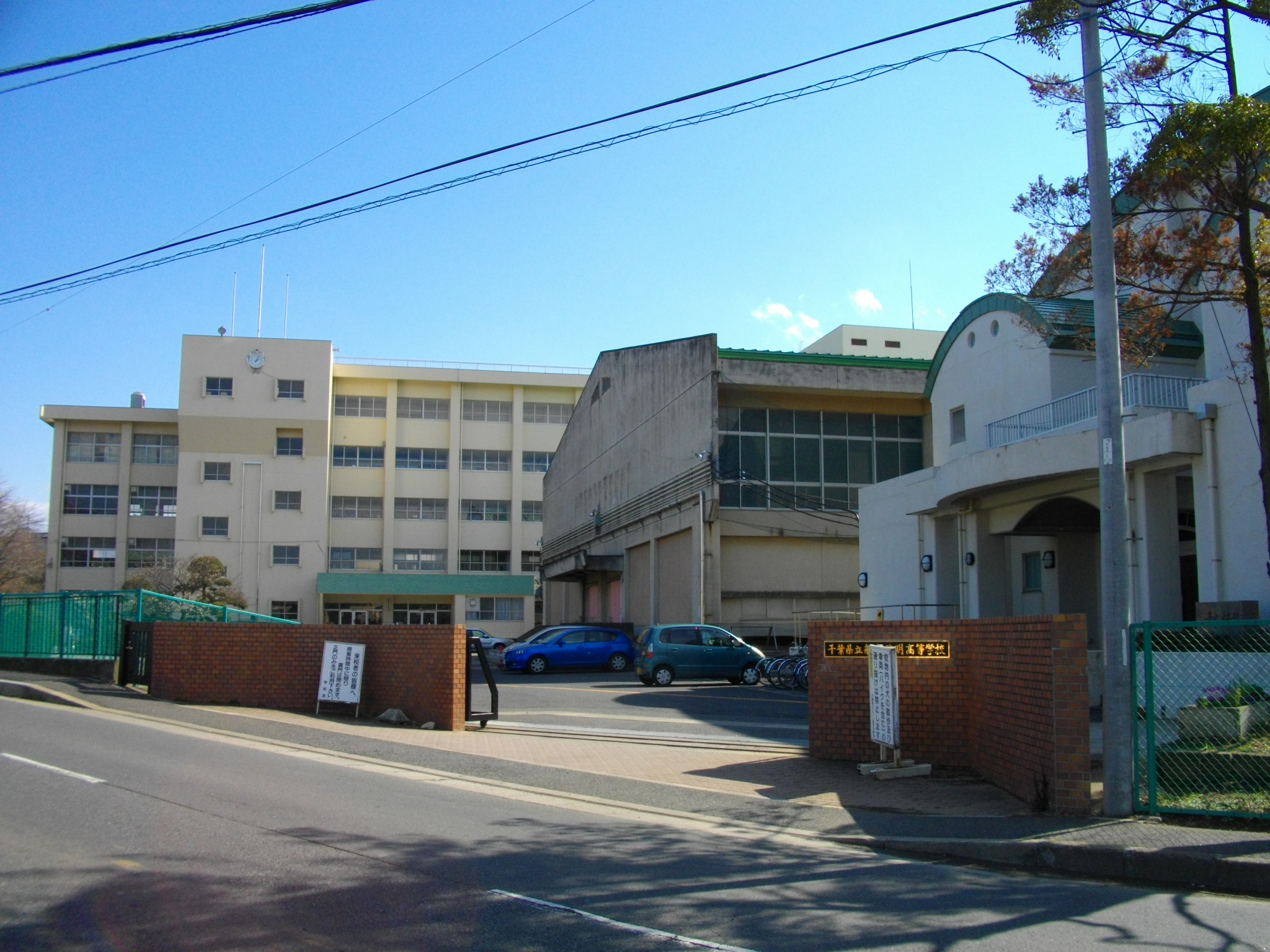

Location
- Japan

Information
- Established: 2011

Chiba Prefectural Funabashi Keimei High School (千葉県立船橋啓明高等学校, Chiba Kenritsu Funabashi Keimei Kōtōgakkō) is a senior high school in Funabashi, Chiba, Japan. The school was established in April 2011 through the merger of Funabashi Asahi High School and Funabashi Nishi High School. That year it had 955 students; these students originated from about 100 junior high schools.
