= Funabashihōten Station =

Railway station in Funabashi, Chiba Prefecture, Japan

JM11 Funabashihōten Station 船橋法典駅
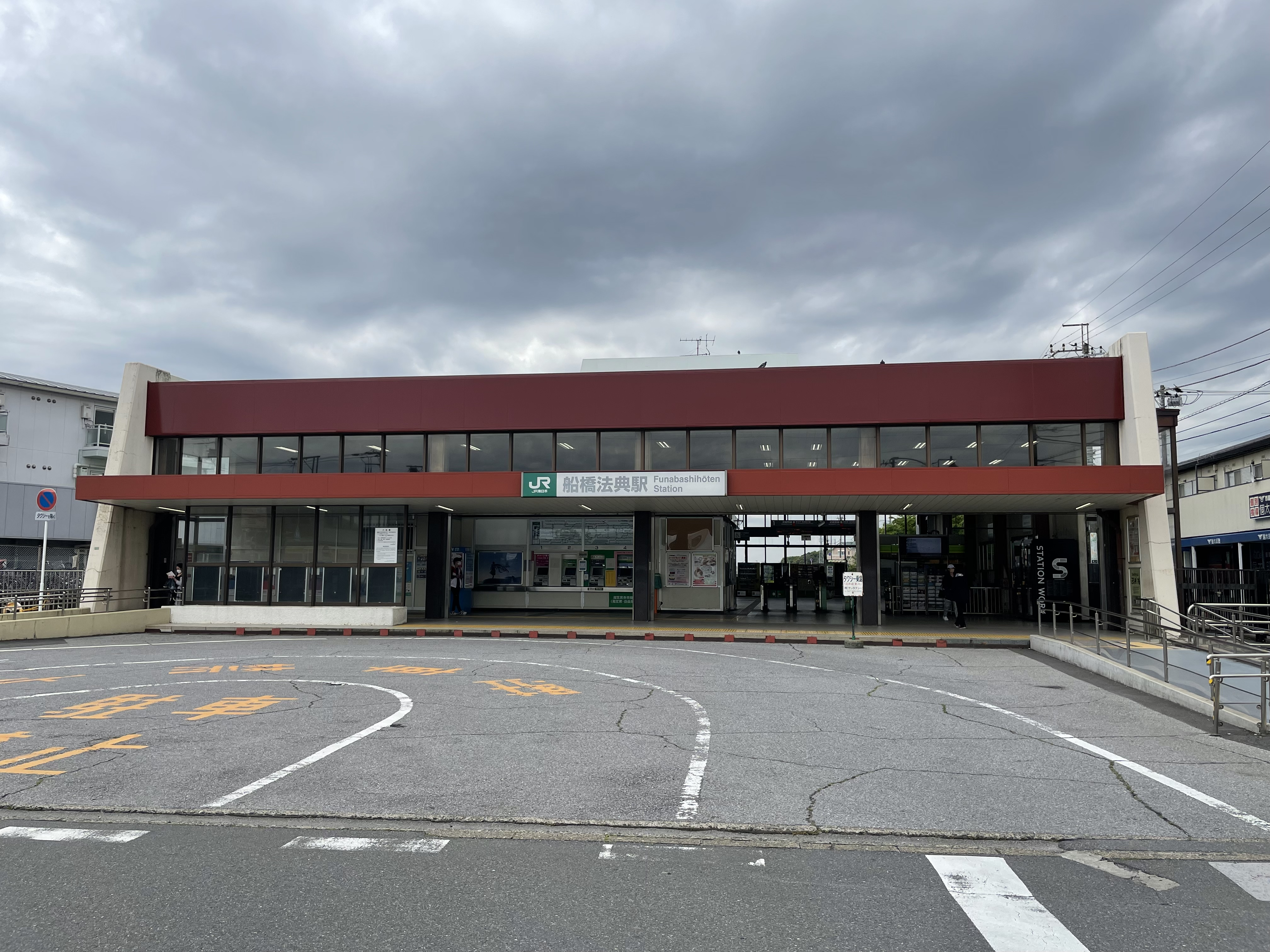
- Funabashihōten Station, May 2022

General information
- Location: 1 Fujiwara, Funabashi-shi, Chiba-ken 273–0046; Japan
- Coordinates: 35°43′51.0276″N 139°57′59.6844″E
- Operator: JR East
- Line: Musashino Line
- Distance: 68.9 km from Fuchūhommachi
- Platforms: 1 island platform

Other information
- Status: Staffed
- Station code: JM11
- Website: Official website

History
- Opened: 2 October 1978

Passengers
- FY2019: 18,815 daily

Services
Preceding station	JR East	Following station
Ichikawaōno JM12 towards Ōmiya	Shimōsa	Nishi-Funabashi JM10 towards Kaihimmakuhari
Ichikawaōno JM12 towards Fuchūhommachi	Musashino Line	Nishi-Funabashi JM10 towards Kaihimmakuhari or Tokyo
Location
- Location within Chiba Prefecture Location within Japan

Funabashihōten Station (船橋法典駅, Funabashi-Hōten-eki) is a passenger railway station in the city of Funabashi, Chiba, Japan, operated by East Japan Railway Company (JR East).

== Lines ==
Funabashihōten Station is served by the orbital Musashino Line between Fuchūhommachi and Nishi-Funabashi, with some trains continuing to Tokyo via the Keiyō Line. It is located 68.9 kilometers from Fuchūhommachi Station.

== Station layout ==
The station consists of an island platform serving two tracks. The platforms are located in a cutting below street level, with the station building above. The station is staffed.

=== Platforms ===
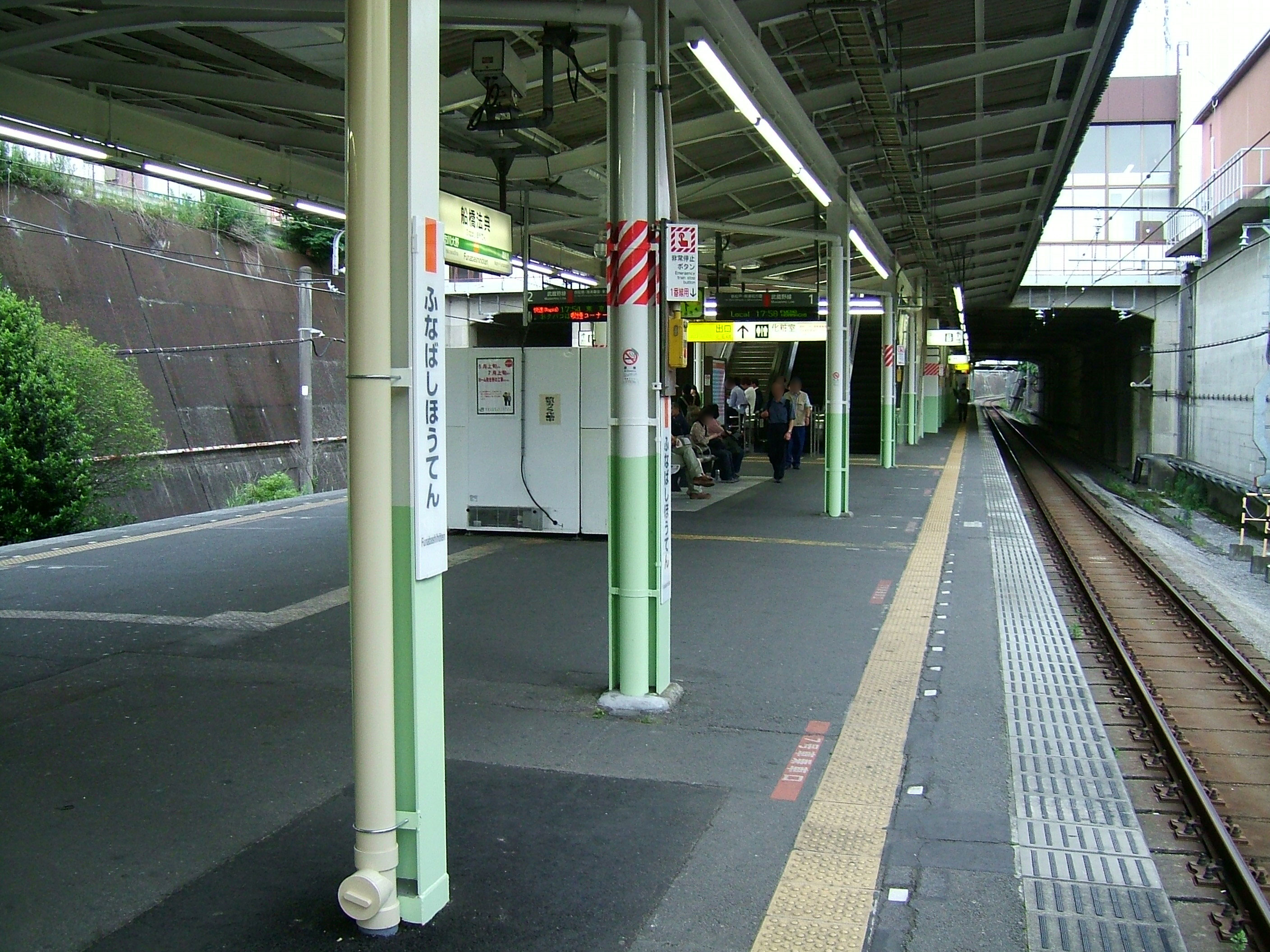
Funabashi-Hōten Station platforms

1	Musashino Line	for Shim-Matsudo, Minami-Koshigaya, Musashi-Urawa, Nishi-Kokubunji, and Fuchūhommachi
2	Musashino Line	for Nishi-Funabashi, Tokyo, and Kaihimmakuhari

== History ==
The station opened on 2 October 1978.

== Passenger statistics ==
In fiscal 2019, the station was used by an average of 18,815 passengers daily (boarding passengers only).

== Surrounding area ==
- Nakayama Racecourse
- Chiba Ichikawa Higashi High School
- Chiba Funabashi-Hōten High School
- Matsugane Stable

== Bus routes ==
- AEON MALL Shuttle Bus
  - For AEON MALL FUNABASHI
- Keisei Bus Fighters Town Line and Keisei Bus System Kashiwai Line
  - For Nishi-Funabashi Station and Ichikawa Office
- Chiba Rainbow Bus Shiroi Line
  - For Nishi-Funabashi Station and Shiroi Station

== See also ==
- List of railway stations in Japan
