= Higashi-Nakayama Station =

Railway station in Funabashi, Chiba Prefecture, Japan

KS19 Higashi-Nakayama Station 東中山駅
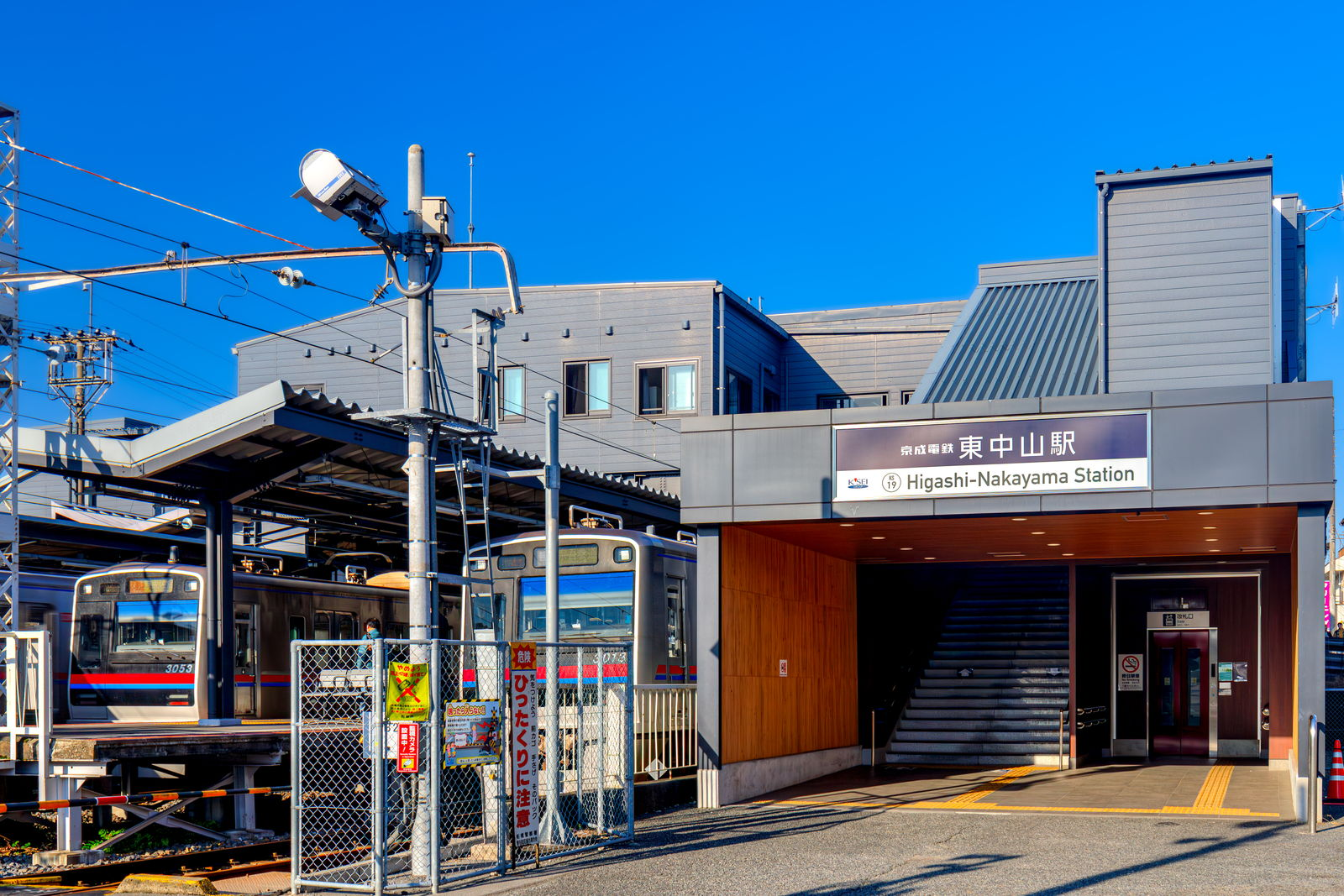
- Higashi-Nakayama Station

General information
- Location: 2-2-22 Higashi-Nakayama, Funabashi-shi, Chiba-ken 273-0036; Japan
- Coordinates: 35.7143°N 139.9529°E
- Operator: Keisei Electric Railway
- Line: Keisei Main Line
- Distance: 21.6 km from Keisei Ueno
- Platforms: 2 island platforms
- Tracks: 4

Other information
- Station code: KS19
- Website: Official website

History
- Opened: 1 September 1953

Passengers
- FY2019: 6,807 daily

Services
Preceding station	Keisei	Following station
Keisei Yawata KS16 towards Keisei Ueno	Main Line Rapid	Keisei Funabashi KS22 towards Narita Airport Terminal 1
Keisei Nakayama KS18 towards Keisei Ueno	Main Line Local	Keisei Nishifuna KS20 towards Narita Airport Terminal 1
Location
- Location within Chiba Prefecture Location within Japan

Higashi-Nakayama Station (東中山駅, Higashi-Nakayama-eki) is a passenger railway station in the city of Funabashi, Chiba Prefecture, Japan, operated by the private railway operator Keisei Electric Railway.

== Lines ==
Higashi-Nakayama Station is served by the Keisei Main Line, and is located 21.6 km (13.4 mi) from the terminus of the line at Keisei Ueno Station.

== Station layout ==
The station consists of two island platforms connected by a footbridge to an elevated station building.

=== Platforms ===
1-2	Keisei Main Line	for Keisei Takasago, Nippori, Keisei Ueno, and Oshiage; Toei Asakusa Line for Nihombashi, Sengakuji, and Nishi-magome; Keikyu Main Line for Shinagawa and Haneda Airport (International Terminal and Domestic Terminal)
3-4	Keisei Main Line	for Keisei Funabashi, Keisei Tsudanuma, Keisei Chiba, Chiharadai, Keisei Narita, and Narita Airport (Terminal 2·3 and Terminal 1)

== History ==
Higashi-Nakayama Station opened on 1 September 1953. The Toei Asakusa Line began operating from 4 September 1961, and through trains operate between Oshiage and this station.

Station numbering was introduced to all Keisei Line stations on 17 July 2010. Higashi Nakayama was assigned station number KS19.

== Passenger statistics ==
In fiscal 2019, the station was used by an average of 6,807 passengers daily.

== Surrounding area ==
- Ichikawa City Wakamiya Community Center
- Funabashi City Western Public Hall
- Funabashi City Motonakayama Children's Home

== See also ==
- List of railway stations in Japan
