= Shin-Funabashi Station =

Railway station in Funabashi, Chiba Prefecture, Japan

TD34 Shin-Funabashi Station 新船橋駅
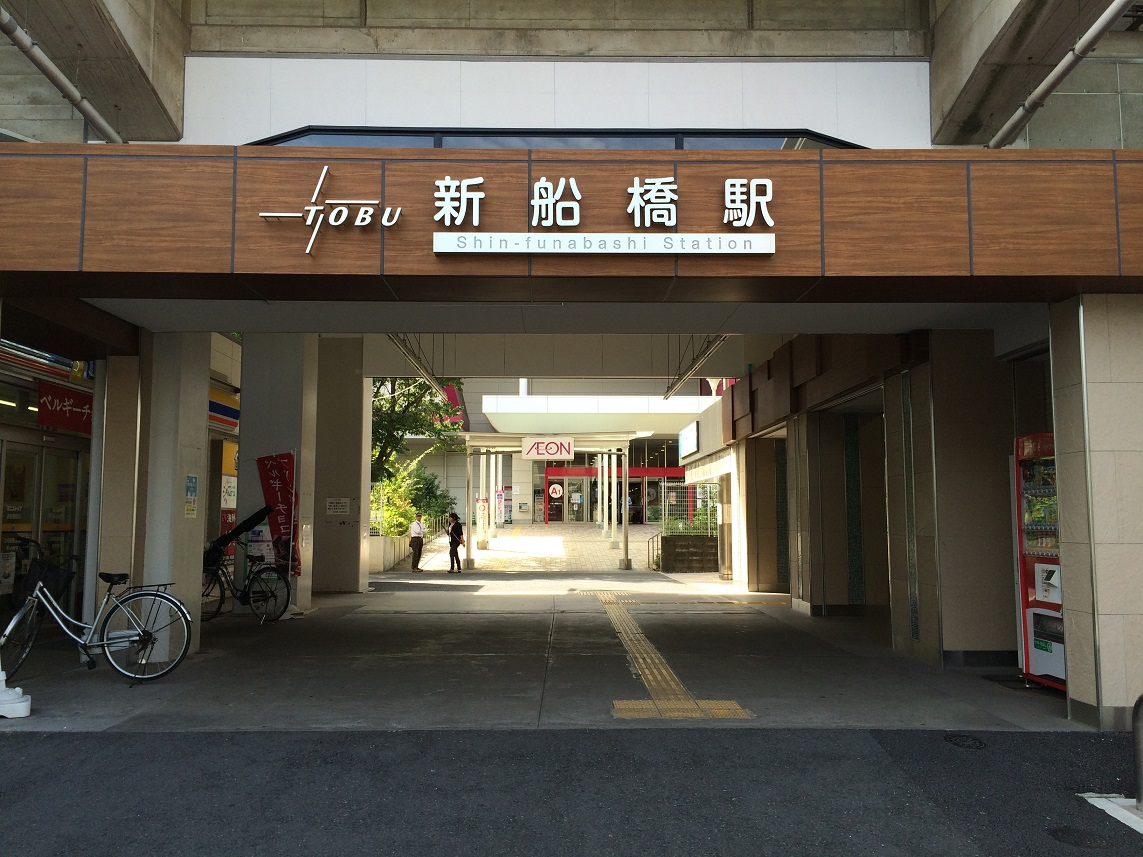
- The east entrance in September 2015

General information
- Location: 1-3-1 Yamate, Funabashi-shi, Chiba-ken 273-0045; Japan
- Coordinates: 35.7111°N 139.9800°E
- Operator: Tobu Railway
- Line: Tobu Urban Park Line
- Distance: 61.3 km from Ōmiya
- Platforms: 2 side platforms
- Tracks: 2

Other information
- Station code: TD-34
- Website: Official website

History
- Opened: 15 September 1956; 69 years ago

Passengers
- FY2019: 13,943 daily

Services
Preceding station	Tobu Railway	Following station
Tsukada TD33 towards Ōmiya	Tōbu Urban Park Line Local	Funabashi TD35 Terminus
Location
- Location within Chiba Prefecture Location within Japan

Shin-Funabashi Station (新船橋駅, Shin-Funabashi-eki) is a passenger railway station in the city of Funabashi, Chiba, Japan, operated by the private railway operator Tōbu Railway. The station is numbered "TD-34".

== Lines ==
Shin-Funabashi Station is served by Tobu Urban Park Line (also known as the Tōbu Noda Line), and lies 61.3 km (38.1 mi) from the western terminus of the line at Ōmiya Station.

== Station layout ==
This station consists of two elevated opposed side platforms serving two tracks, with the station building located underneath.

=== Platforms ===
1	■ Tobu Urban Park Line	for Funabashi
2	■ Tobu Urban Park Line	for Kashiwa, Nodashi, Kasukabe, and Ōmiya

== History ==
The station opened on 15 September 1956. From 17 March 2012, station numbering was introduced on all Tobu lines, with NIshi-Funabashi Station becoming "TD-34".

== Passenger statistics ==
In fiscal 2019, the station was used by an average of 13,943 passengers daily.

== Surrounding area ==
- AEON MALL FUNABASHI
  - It departs from this commercial complex that AEON MALL FUNABASHI Shuttle Bus bound for Funabashi-Hoten Station
- Higashi-Kaijin Station
  - Seven minutes' walk brings passengers to the station.

== See also ==
- List of railway stations in Japan
