= Keisei Nakayama Station =

Railway station in Funabashi, Chiba Prefecture, Japan

KS18 Keisei Nakayama Station 京成中山駅
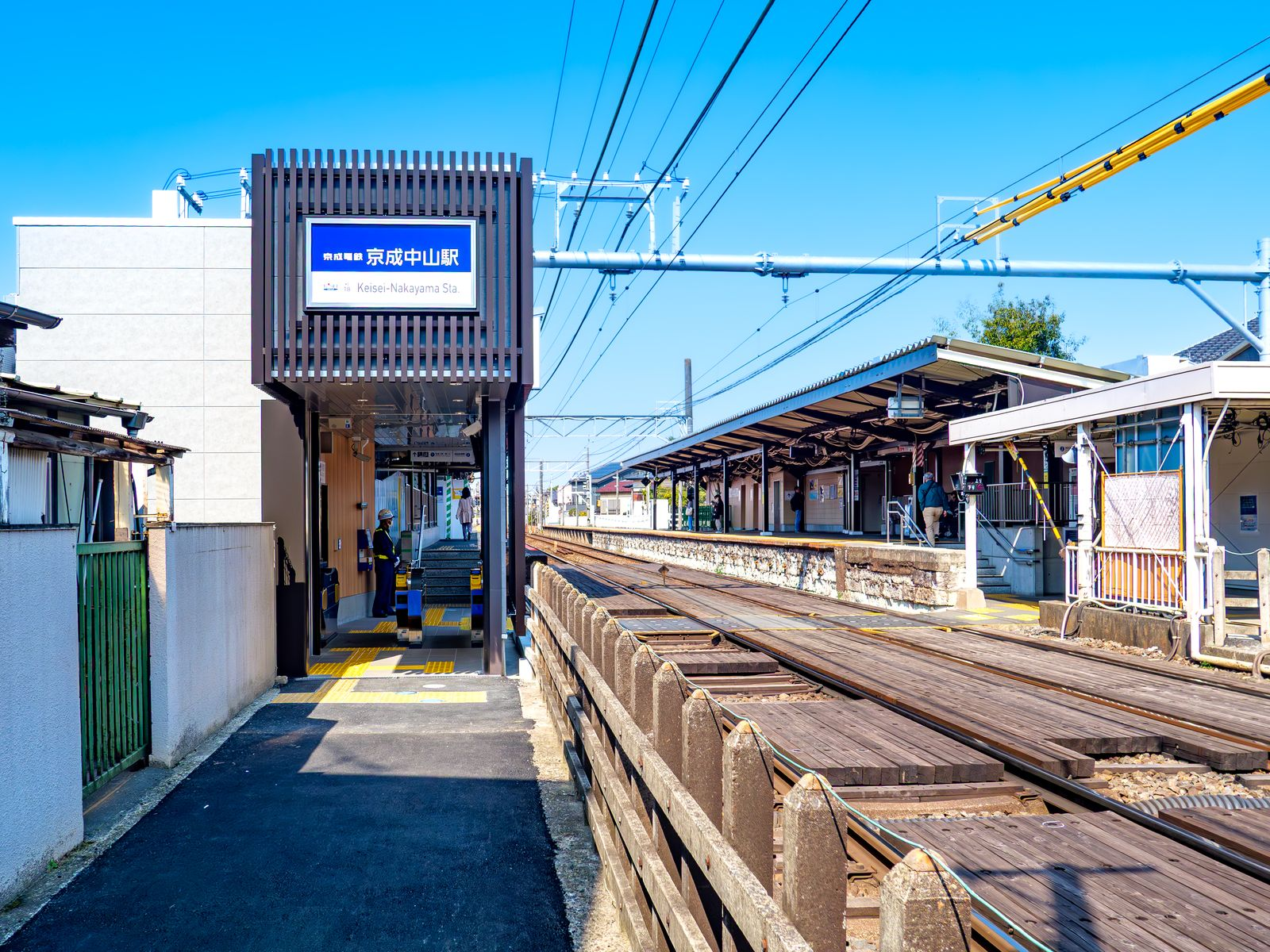
- Station entrance in March 2025

General information
- Location: 1-9-1 Motonakayama, Funabashi-shi, Chiba-ken 273-0035; Japan
- Coordinates: 35.7168°N 139.9444°E
- Operator: Keisei Electric Railway
- Line: Keisei Main Line

Other information
- Station code: KS18
- Website: Official website

History
- Opened: November 3, 1915

Passengers
- FY2019: 3,766 daily

Services
Preceding station	Keisei	Following station
Onigoe KS17 towards Keisei Ueno	Main Line Local	Higashi-Nakayama KS19 towards Narita Airport Terminal 1
Location
- Location within Chiba Prefecture Location within Japan

Keisei Nakayama Station (京成中山駅, Keisei-Nakayama-eki) is a passenger railway station in the city of Funabashi, Chiba Prefecture, Japan, operated by the private railway operator Keisei Electric Railway.

== Lines ==
Keisei Nakayama Station is served by the Keisei Main Line, and is located 20.8 km from the terminus of the line at Keisei Ueno Station.

== Station layout ==
The station consists of two elevated opposed side platforms connected via an underpass to the station building underneath.

=== Platforms ===
1	Keisei Main Line	for Keisei-Takasago, Nippori, and Keisei Ueno
2	Keisei Main Line	for Keisei Tsudanuma, Chiharadai, and Keisei Narita

== History ==
Keisei Nakayama Station was opened on 3 November 1915.

Station numbering was introduced to all Keisei Line stations on 17 July 2010. Keisei Nakayama was assigned station number KS18.

== Passenger statistics ==
In fiscal 2019, the station was used by an average of 3,766 passengers daily.

== Surrounding area ==
- Higashiyama Kaii Memorial Hall
- Ichikawa Municipal Fourth Junior High School
- Funabashi City Western Public Hall

== See also ==
- List of railway stations in Japan
