= Kūtei-kan =

Coordinates: 35.71076°N 140.05381°E

Kūtei-kan (空挺館, Sky-Volunteer Hall) is an exhibition institution in Ground Self-Defense Force Narashino Camp.

Originally, the building was built for the Emperor and Imperial Family to watch horsemanship of the cavalry regiment, as Gobaken-jyo or Gobami-dokoro (御馬見所, "Honorable Horse-Watching Audience Seating"). It is one of the famous places in Funabashi.
