= Tsukada Station =

Railway station in Funabashi, Chiba Prefecture, Japan

TD33 Tsukada Station 塚田駅
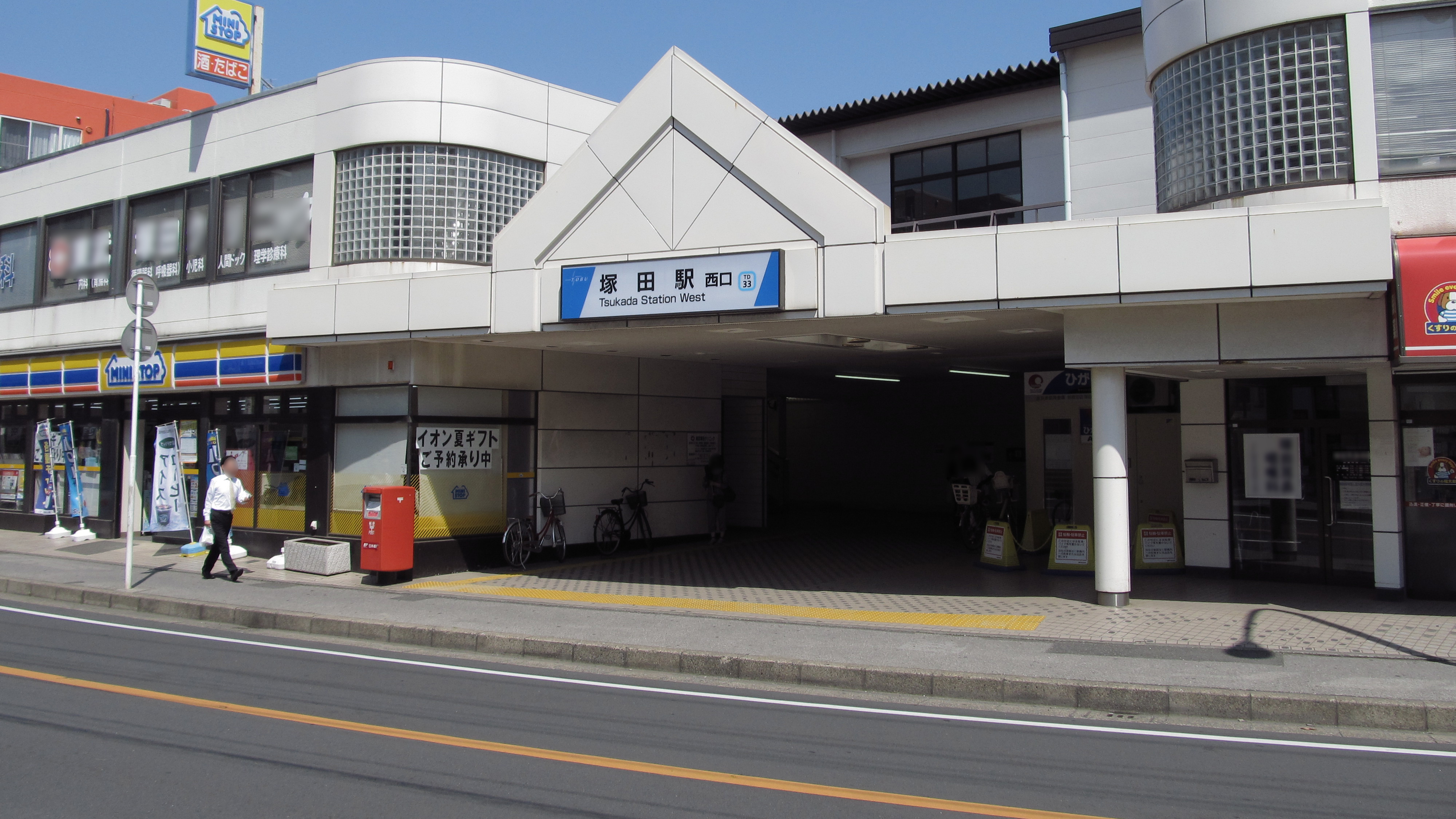
- The west entrance to Tsukada Station in May 2013

General information
- Location: Maekaizuka, Funabashi-shi, Chiba-ken 273-0042; Japan
- Coordinates: 35.7222°N 139.9826°E
- Operator: Tobu Railway
- Line: Tobu Urban Park Line
- Distance: 60.1 km from Ōmiya
- Platforms: 2 side platforms
- Tracks: 2

Other information
- Station code: TD-33
- Website: Official website

History
- Opened: 27 December 1923; 102 years ago

Passengers
- FY2019: 16,203 daily

Services
Preceding station	Tobu Railway	Following station
Magomezawa TD32 towards Ōmiya	Tōbu Urban Park Line Local	Shin-Funabashi TD34 towards Funabashi
Location
- Location within Chiba Prefecture Location within Japan

Tsukada Station (塚田駅, Tsukada-eki) is a passenger railway station in the city of Funabashi, Chiba, Japan, operated by the private railway operator Tōbu Railway. The station is numbered "TD-33".

== Lines ==
Tsukada Station is served by Tobu Urban Park Line (also known as the Tōbu Noda Line), and lies 60.1 km (37.3 mi) from the western terminus of the line at Ōmiya Station.

== Station layout ==
The station consists of two opposed side platforms serving two tracks, with an elevated station building.

=== Platforms ===
1	■ Tobu Urban Park Line	for Funabashi
2	■ Tobu Urban Park Line	for Kashiwa, Nodashi, Kasukabe, and Ōmiya

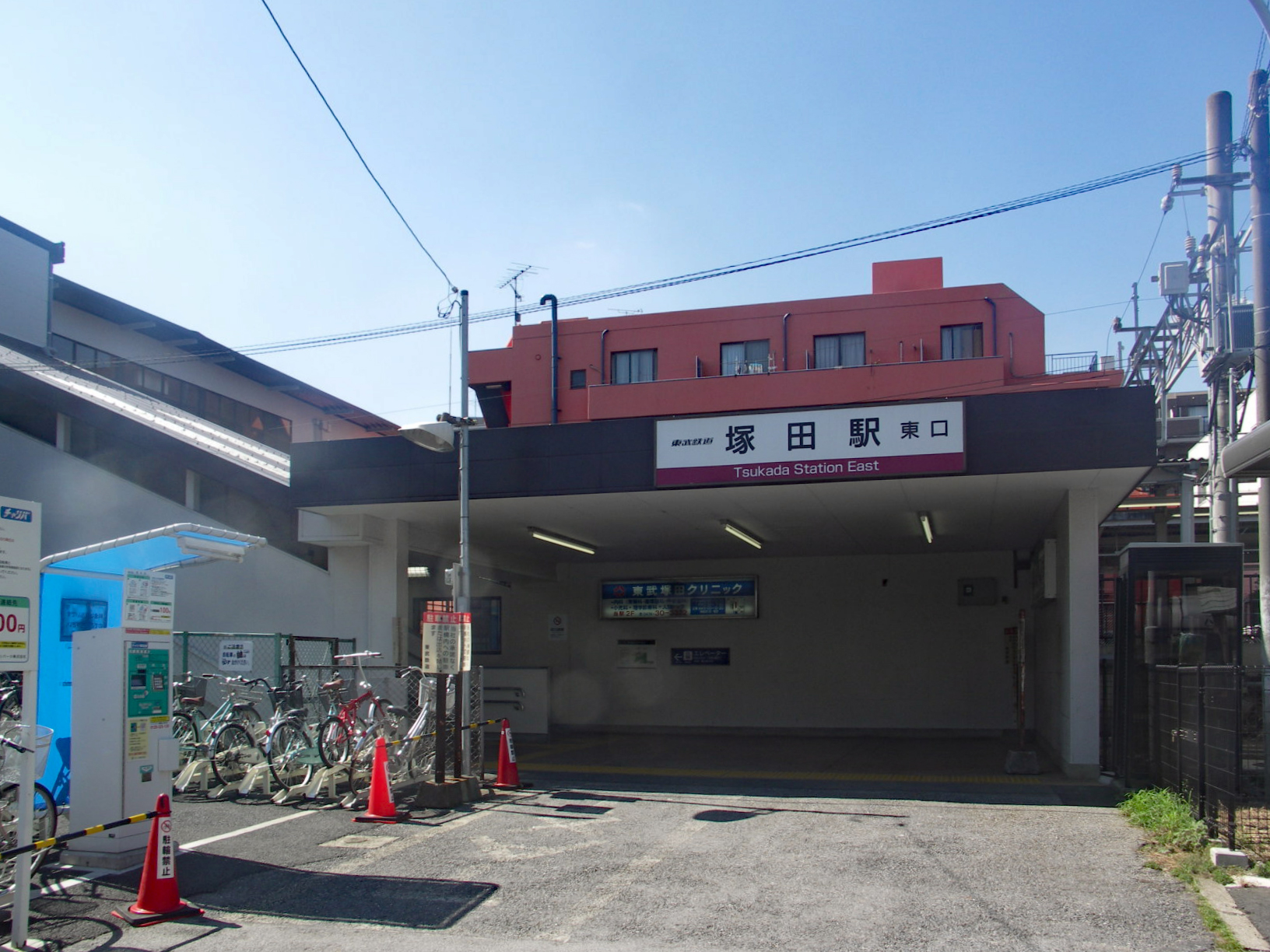
The east entrance in September 2007

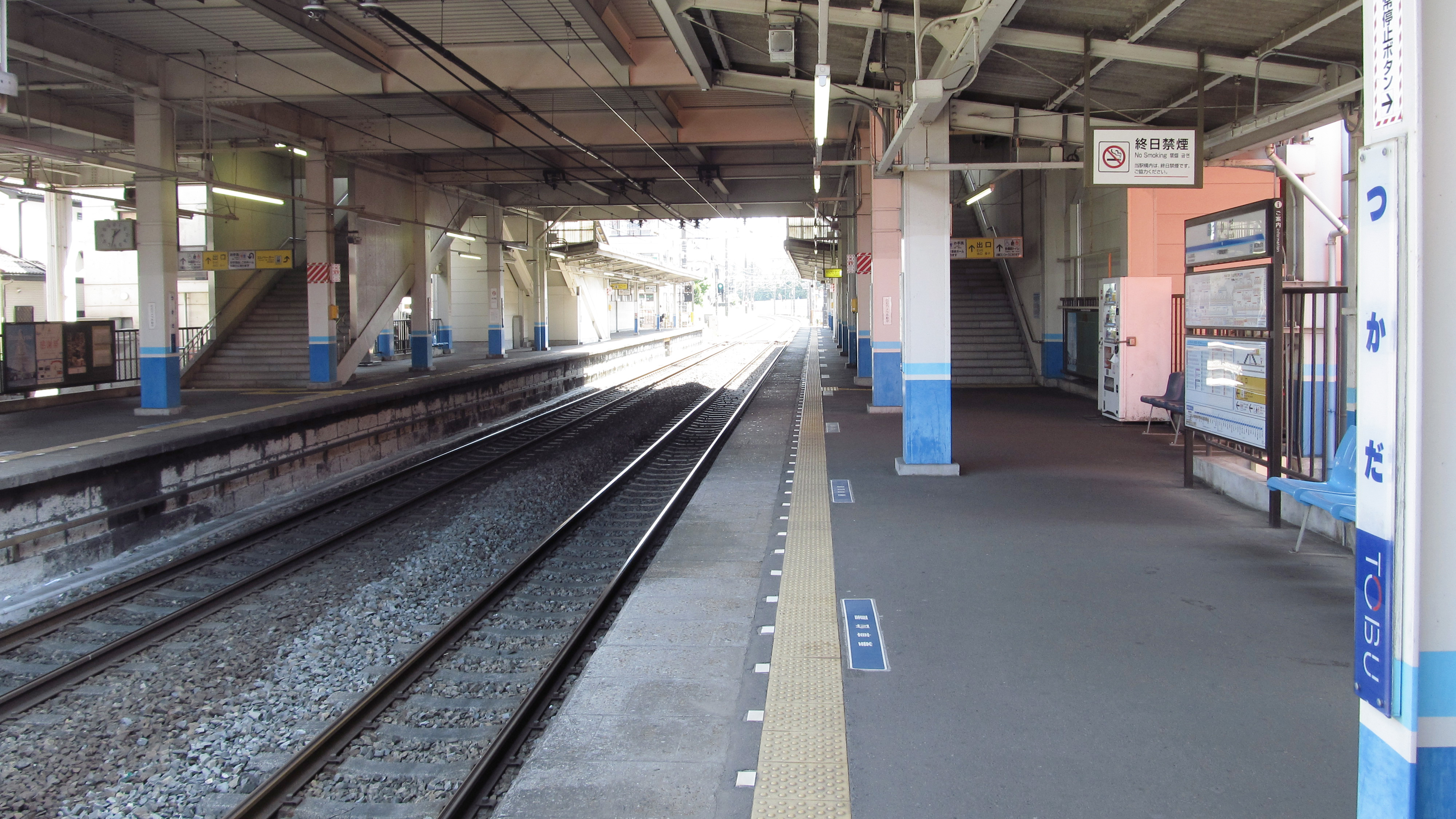
The platforms in May 2013

== History ==
Tsukada Station opened on 27 December 1923.

From 17 March 2012, station numbering was introduced on all Tobu lines, with Tsukada Station becoming "TD-33".

== Passenger statistics ==
In fiscal 2019, the station was used by an average of 16,203 passengers daily.

== Surrounding area ==
- Tsukada Post Office
- Gyoda Park
- Chiba Prefectural Funabashi Keimei High School

== See also ==
- List of railway stations in Japan
