= Higashi-Kaijin Station =

Railway station in Funabashi, Chiba Prefecture, Japan

TR02 Higashi-Kaijin Station 東海神駅
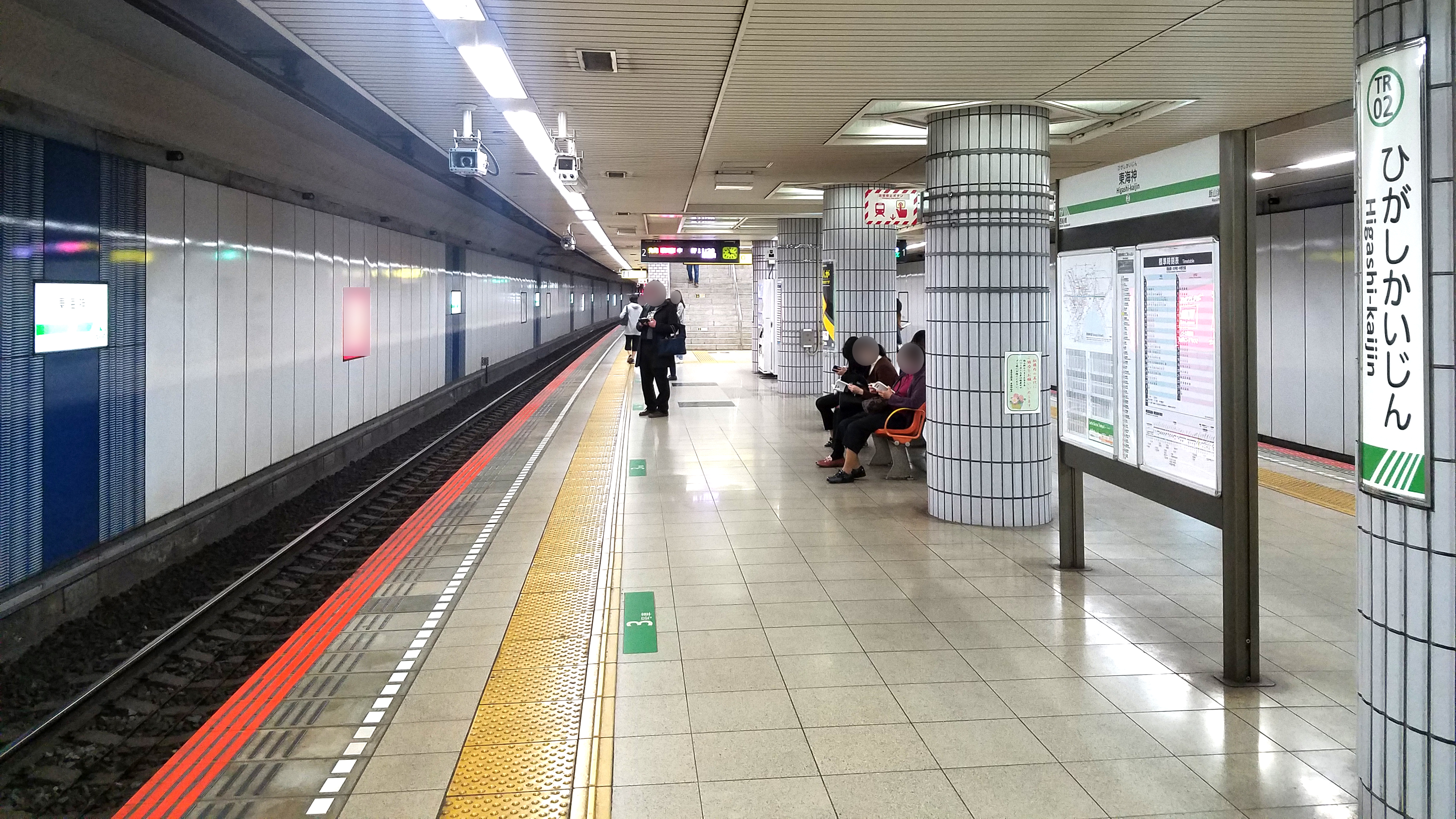
- The station platform in April 2021

General information
- Location: 2-15-1 Kaijin, Funabashi-shi, Chiba-ken 273-0021; Japan
- Coordinates: 35.7058°N 139.9805°E
- Operator: Tōyō Rapid Railway
- Line: Tōyō Rapid Railway Line
- Distance: 2.1 km (1.3 mi) from Nishi-Funabashi
- Platforms: 1 island platform
- Tracks: 2

Construction
- Structure type: Underground

Other information
- Station code: TR02
- Website: Official website

History
- Opened: 27 April 1996; 30 years ago

Passengers
- FY2018: 4,273 daily

Services
Preceding station	Tōyō Rapid Railway	Following station
Nishi-Funabashi TR01 Terminus	Tōyō Rapid Railway Line	Hasama TR03 towards Tōyō-Katsutadai
Location
- Location within Tokyo Keiyo area Location within Chiba Prefecture Location within Japan

Higashi-Kaijin Station (東海神駅, Higashi-Kaijin-eki) is a passenger railway station in the city of Funabashi, Chiba, Japan, operated by the third sector railway operator Tōyō Rapid Railway.

== Lines ==
Higashi-Kaijin Station is a station on the Tōyō Rapid Railway Line, and is 2.1 km from the starting point of the line at Nishi-Funabashi Station.

== Station layout ==
The station is an underground station with a single island platform located on the second story underground. The ticket gates are located on the first story underground.

=== Platforms ===
1	Tōyō Rapid Railway Line	for Kita-Narashino, Yachiyo-Midorigaoka, and Tōyō-Katsutadai
2	Tōyō Rapid Railway Line	for Nishi-Funabashi, Tōyōchō, Nihombashi, Ōtemachi, and Nakano

== History ==
Higashi-Kaijin Station was opened on April 27, 1996.

== Passenger statistics ==
In fiscal 2018, the station was used by an average of 4,273 passengers daily.

== Surrounding area ==
- Funabashi City Hinodai Historical Park Museum (adjacent to Kaijin Junior High School)
- Funabashi City Kaijin Junior High School (northwest side of the station)
- Funabashi City Funabashi Junior High School
- Funabashi City Kaijin Elementary School (south side of the station)
- Shin-Funabashi Station

== See also ==
- List of railway stations in Japan
