= Higashi-Matsudo Station =

Railway station in Matsudo, Chiba Prefecture, Japan

Higashi-Matsudo Station 東松戸駅
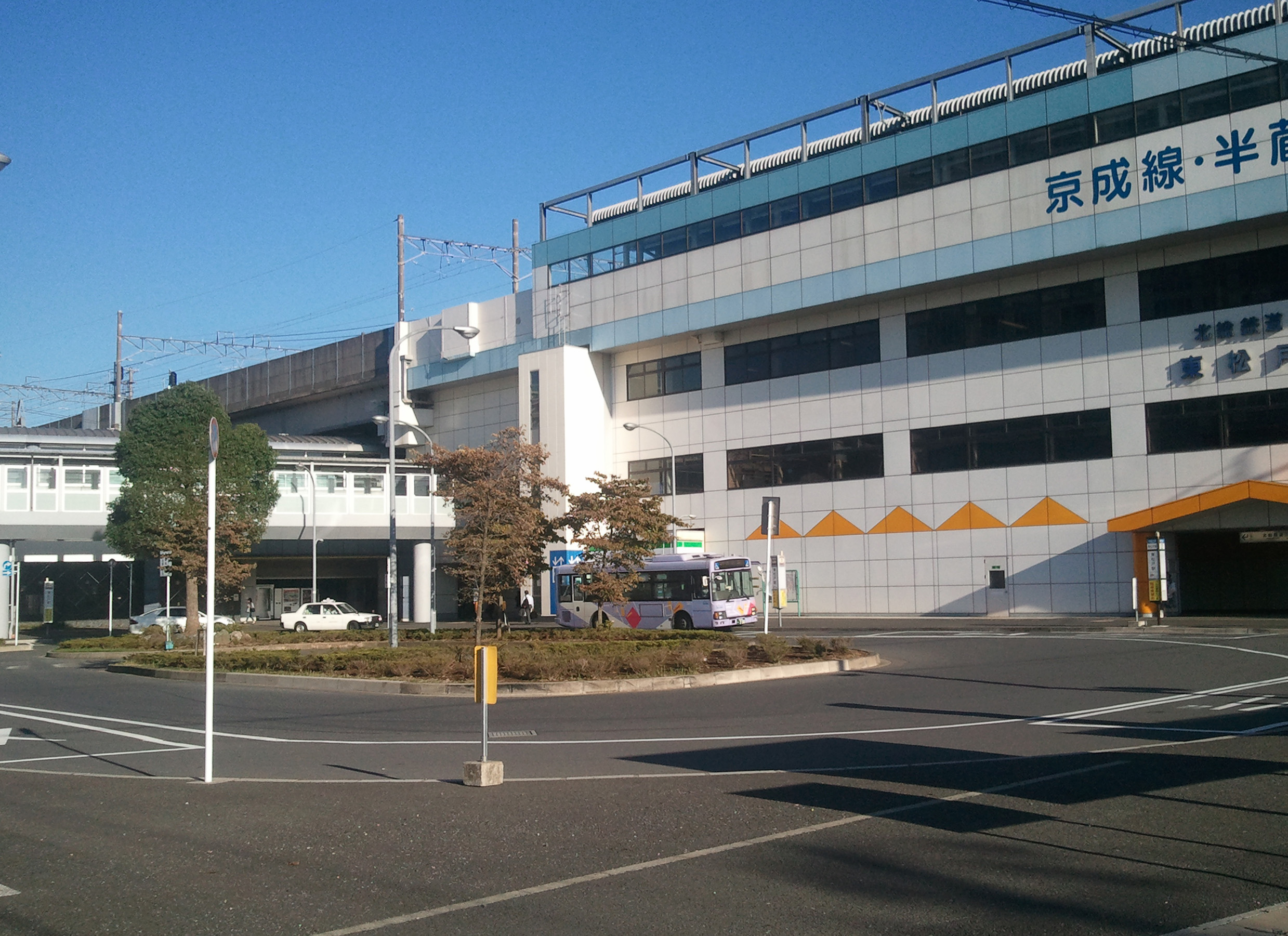
- Higashi-Matsudo Station September 2012

General information
- Location: 2 Chome Higashimatsudo, Matsudo-shi, Chiba-ken 270-2225; Japan
- Coordinates: 35°46′14.2176″N 139°56′37.72″E
- Operator: Hokusō Railway; Keisei Electric Railway; JR East
- Lines: Hokusō Line; Narita Sky Access Line; Musashino Line
Location
- Location within Chiba Prefecture

Higashi-Matsudo Station (東松戸駅, Higashi-Matsudo-eki) is a junction passenger railway station in the city of Matsudo, Chiba, Japan, operated by the East Japan Railway Company (JR East) and the private Keisei Electric Railway and third sector Hokusō Railway.

== Lines ==
Higashi-Matsudo Station is served by the orbital JR East Musashino Line, which runs between Fuchūhommachi and Tokyo, and by the Hokusō Line between Keisei-Takasago and Inba-Nihon-Idai. It is also a stop on the Keisei Narita Sky Access linking downtown Tokyo with Narita Airport.

The station is located 64.0 kilometers from Fuchūhommachi Station on the Musashino Line, and 7.5 kilometers from Keisei-Takasago Station on the Hokusō and Keisei lines.

== Station layout ==
=== Hokusō and Keisei ===
HS05 Higashi-Matsudo Station 東松戸駅
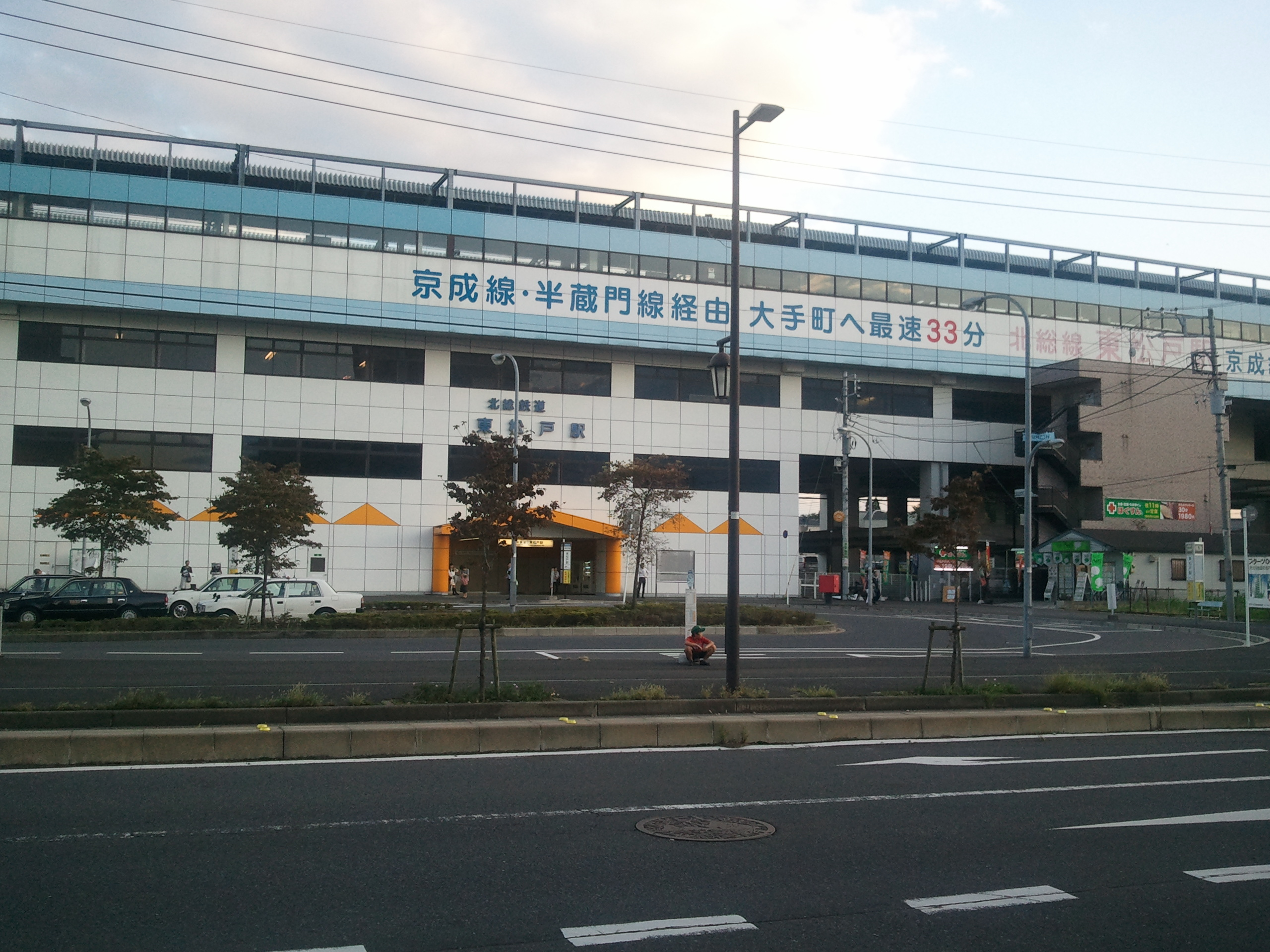
- Hokusō station forecourt in September 2012

General information
- Location: 2-158 Higashi-Matsudo, Matsudo-shi, Chiba-ken; Japan
- System: Hokuso Railway
- Operator: Hokusō Railway; Keisei Railway
- Lines: Hokusō Line; Narita Sky Access Line
- Distance: 7.5 km from Keisei-Takasago
- Platforms: 2 island platforms

Other information
- Station code: HS05
- Website: Official website

History
- Opened: 31 March 1991

Passengers
- 19,082 daily (Hokuso FY2019); 4,537 (Keisei FY2019)

Services
Preceding station	Keisei	Following station
Keisei Takasago KS10 towards Keisei-Takasago	Narita Sky Access Line Access Express	Shin-Kamagaya HS08 towards Narita Airport Terminal 1
Preceding station	Hokusō Railway	Following station
Keisei Takasago KS10 Terminus	Hokusō Line Limited Express	Shin-Kamagaya HS08 towards Imba Nihon-idai
Akiyama HS04 towards Keisei Takasago	Hokusō Line Local	Matsuhidai HS06 towards Imba Nihon-idai
Location

The Hokusō station consists of two elevated island platforms serving four tracks, with the station building located underneath.

=== Hokusō and Narita Sky Access Line platforms ===
1/2	■ Hokusō Line	for Keisei-Takasago, Asakusa, Shinagawa, and Haneda Airport
1/2	■ Narita Sky Access Line	for Keisei-Takasago, Keisei Ueno, Asakusa, Shinagawa, and Haneda Airport Terminal 1·2
3/4	■ Hokusō Line	for Chiba New Town Chūō and Imba Nihon-Idai
3/4	■ Narita Sky Access Line	for Narita Airport

=== JR East ===
JM13 Higashi-Matsudo Station 東松戸駅
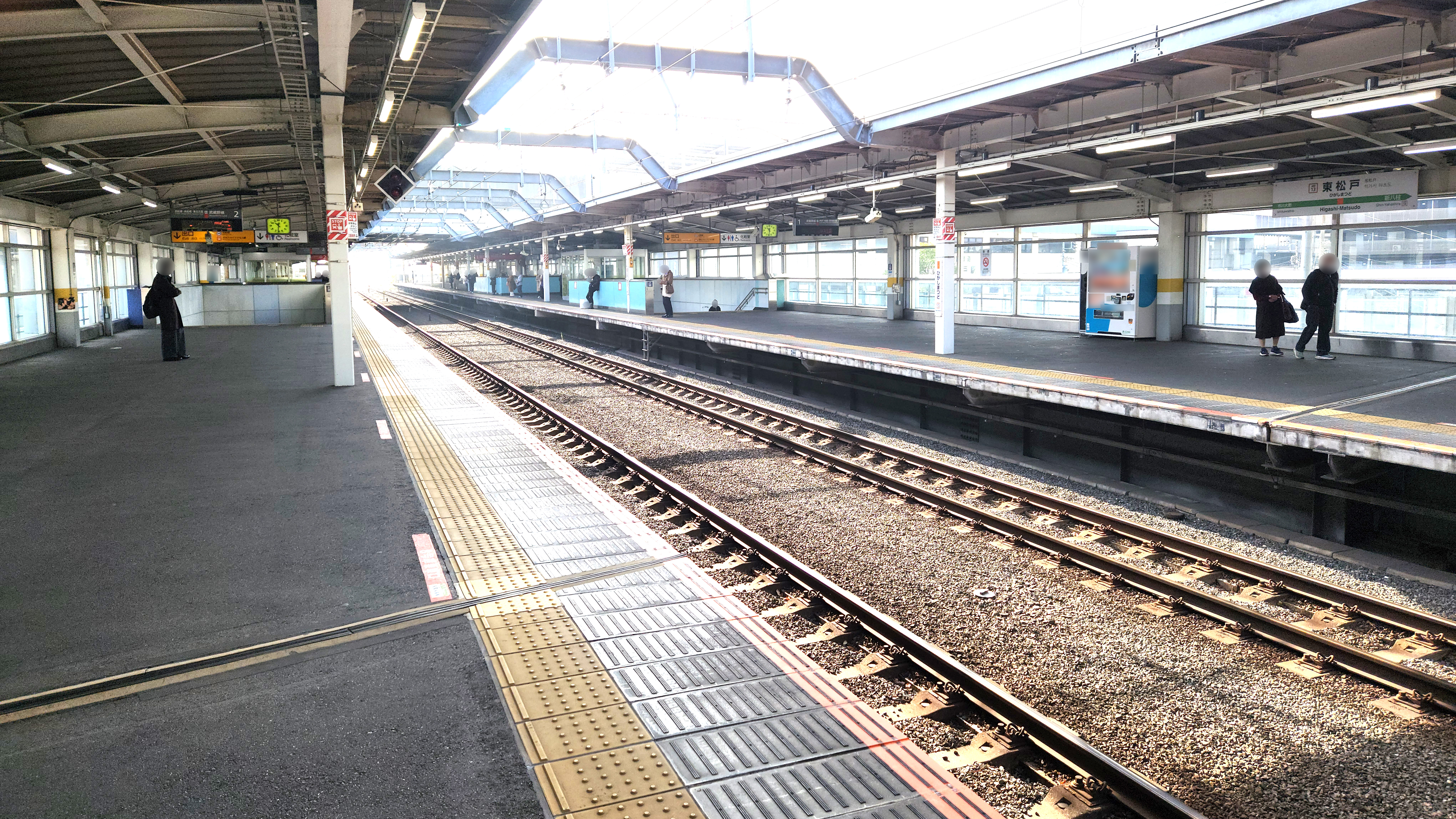
- Musashino Line platforms in December 2023

General information
- Location: 1-143 Higashi-Matsudo, Matsudo-shi, Chiba-ken; Japan
- Operator: JR East
- Line: Musashino Line
- Platforms: 2 side platforms

Other information
- Status: staffed
- Station code: JM13
- Website: Official website

History
- Opened: 14 March 1998

Passengers
- 31 March 1991: 20,839 daily

Services
Preceding station	JR East	Following station
Shin-Yahashira JM14 towards Ōmiya	Shimōsa	Ichikawaōno JM12 towards Kaihimmakuhari
Shin-Yahashira JM14 towards Fuchūhommachi	Musashino Line	Ichikawaōno JM12 towards Kaihimmakuhari or Tokyo
Location

The JR East station consists of two opposed side platforms serving two tracks.

=== JR East platforms ===
1	Musashino Line	for Shim-Matsudo, Minami-Koshigaya, Musashi-Urawa, Nishi-Kokubunji, and Fuchūhommachi
2	Musashino Line	for Nishi-Funabashi, Tokyo, and Kaihimmakuhari

== History ==
The station opened on the Hokusō Line on 31 March 1991.

The JR East station opened on 14 March 1998.

== Passenger statistics ==
In fiscal 2019, the JR East station was used by an average of 20,839 passengers daily (boarding passengers only). The Keisei portion of the station was used by 4,537 daily in FY 2019, and the Hokuso Railway portion of the station was used by 19,082 passengers in FY2018.

== Surrounding area ==
- Yahashira Cemetery
- Chiba Matsudo Minami High School
- Matsudo High School

== See also ==
- List of railway stations in Japan
