= Kamagaya Station =

Railway station in Kamagaya, Chiba Prefecture, Japan

TD31 Kamagaya Station 鎌ヶ谷駅
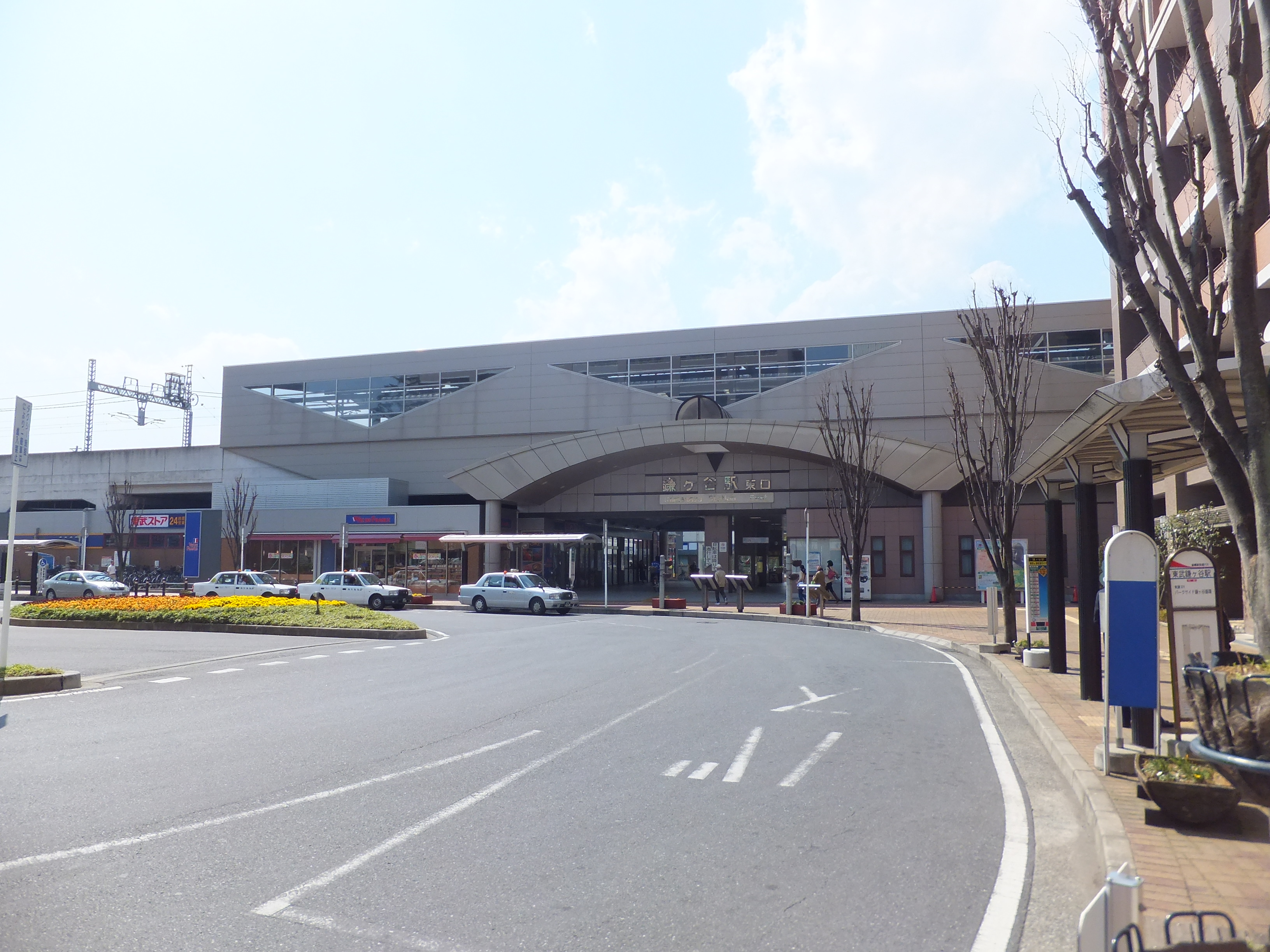
- The east entrance of Kamagaya Station in April 2012

General information
- Location: 2-1-10 Michinobe Chuo, Kamagaya-shi, Chiba-ken 273-0113; Japan
- Coordinates: 35.7639°N 139.9970°E
- Operator: Tobu Railway
- Line: Tobu Urban Park Line
- Distance: 55.2 km from Ōmiya
- Platforms: 2 side platforms
- Tracks: 2

Other information
- Station code: TD-31
- Website: Official website

History
- Opened: 27 December 1923; 102 years ago

Passengers
- FY2017: 22,828 daily

Services
Preceding station	Tobu Railway	Following station
Shin-Kamagaya TD30 towards Ōmiya	Tōbu Urban Park Line Local	Magomezawa TD32 towards Funabashi
Location
- Location within Chiba Prefecture Location within Japan

Kamagaya Station (鎌ヶ谷駅, Kamagaya-eki) is a railway station in the city of Kamagaya, Chiba, Japan, operated by the private railway operator Tōbu Railway. The station is numbered "TD-31".

== Lines ==
Kamagaya Station is served by the 62.7 km (39.0 mi) Tobu Urban Park Line (also known as the Tōbu Noda Line) from Ōmiya in Saitama Prefecture to Funabashi in Chiba Prefecture, and is located 55.2 km (34.3 mi) from the western terminus of the line at Ōmiya.

== Station layout ==
The station consists of two opposed elevated side platforms, with the station building located underneath.

=== Platforms ===
1	Tobu Urban Park Line	for Kashiwa, Nodashi, Kasukabe, and Ōmiya
2	Tobu Urban Park Line	for Magomezawa and Funabashi

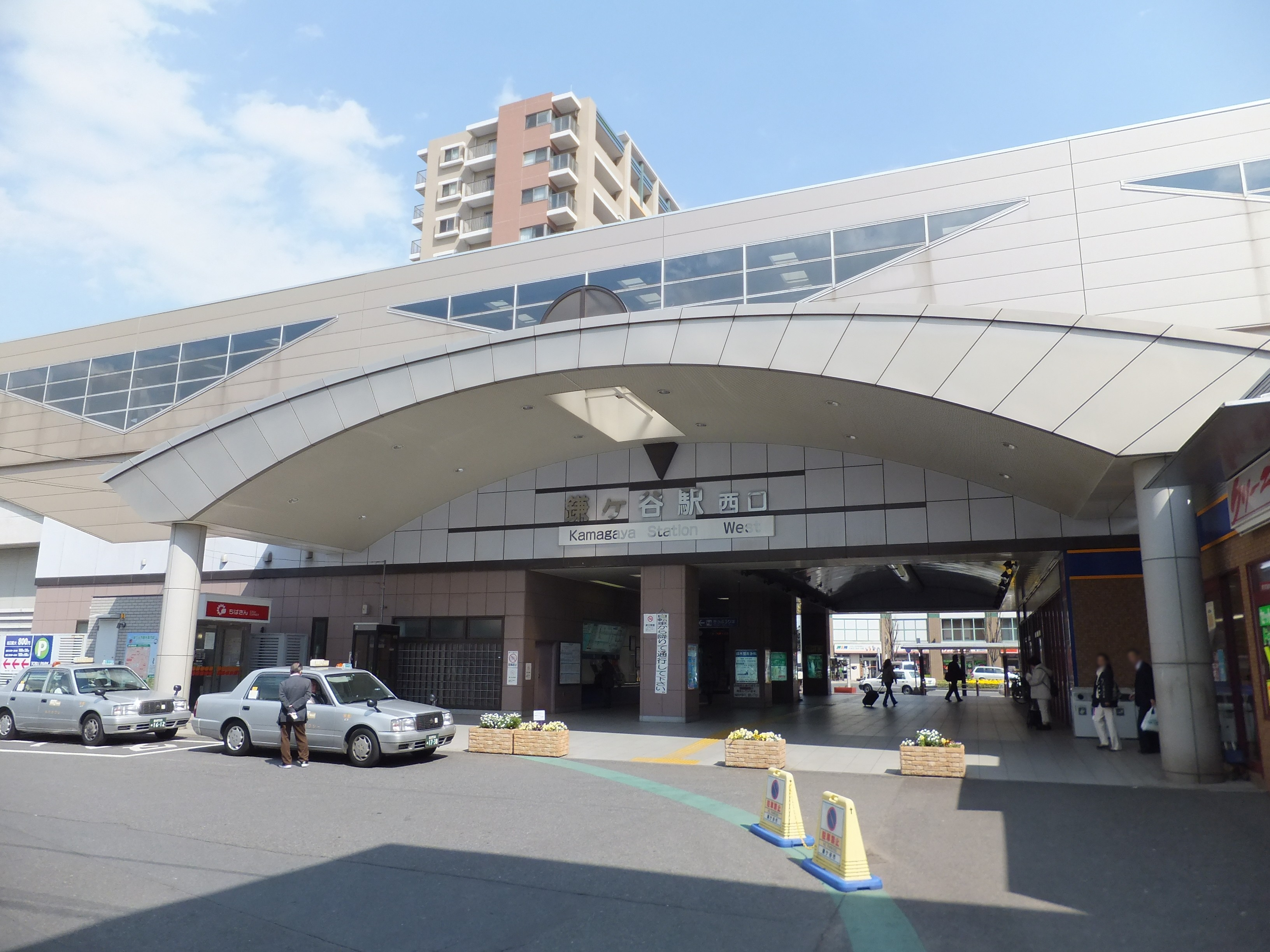
The west entrance in April 2012

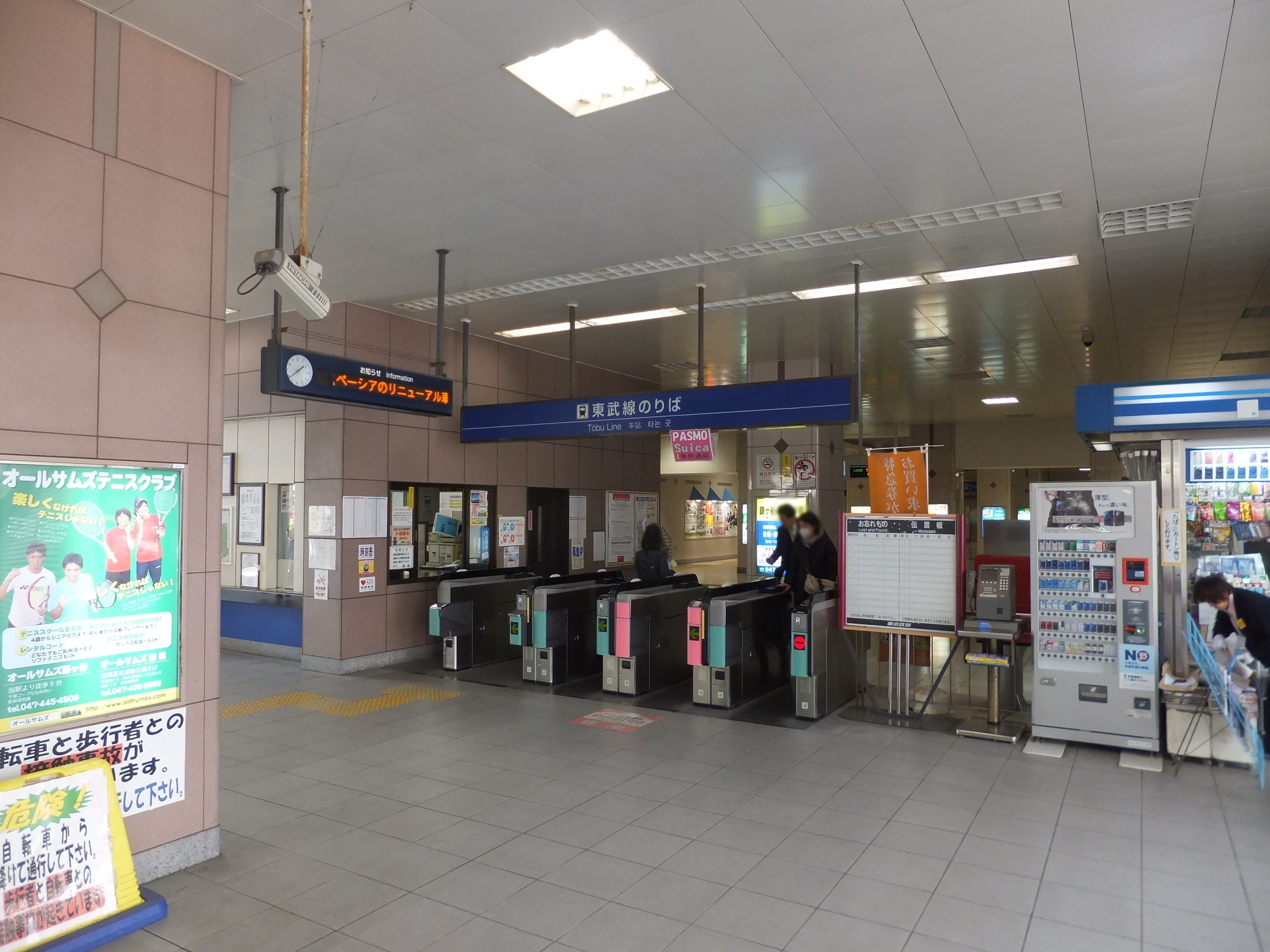
The ticket barriers in April 2012

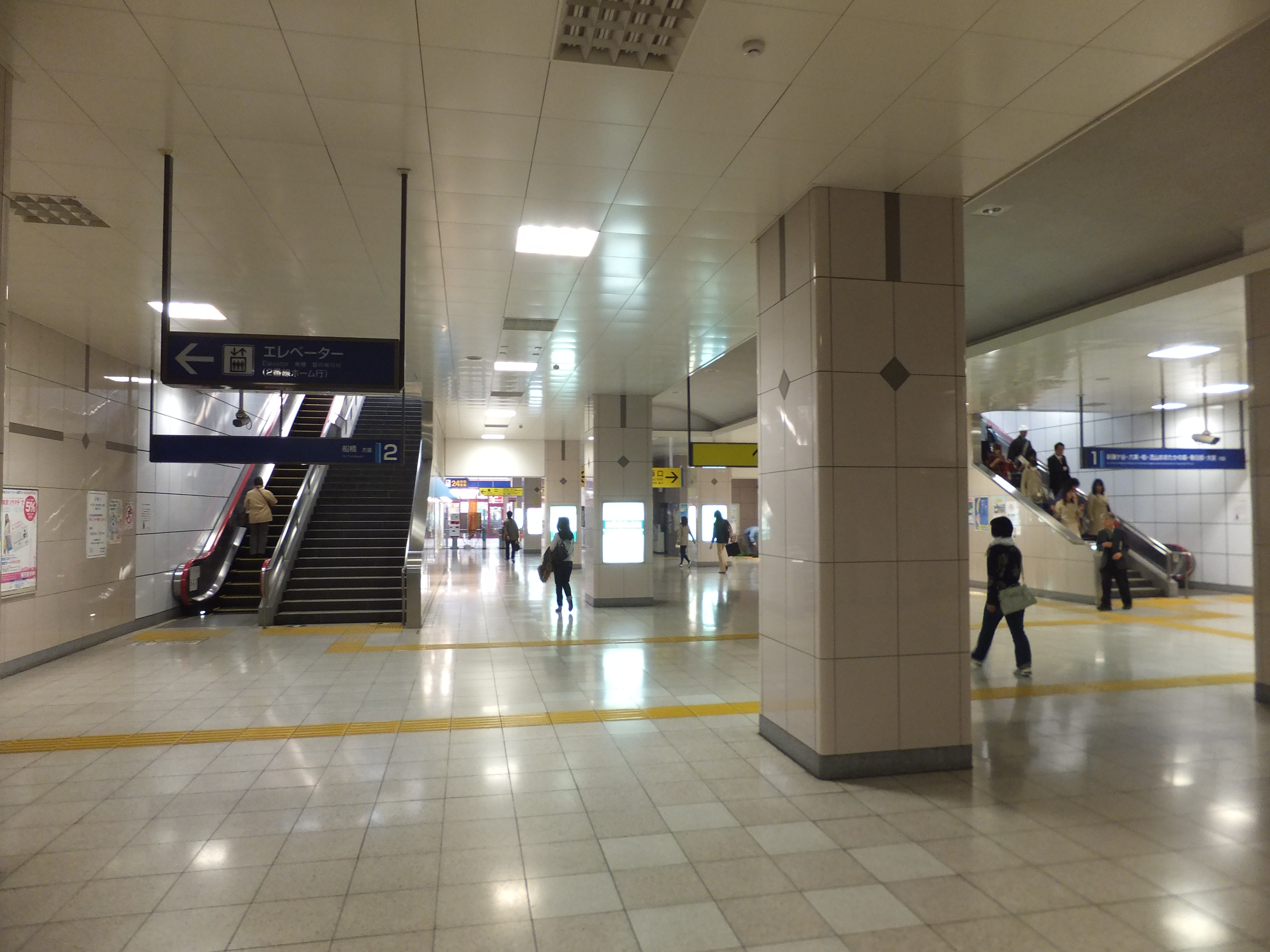
The concourse beneath the platforms in April 2012

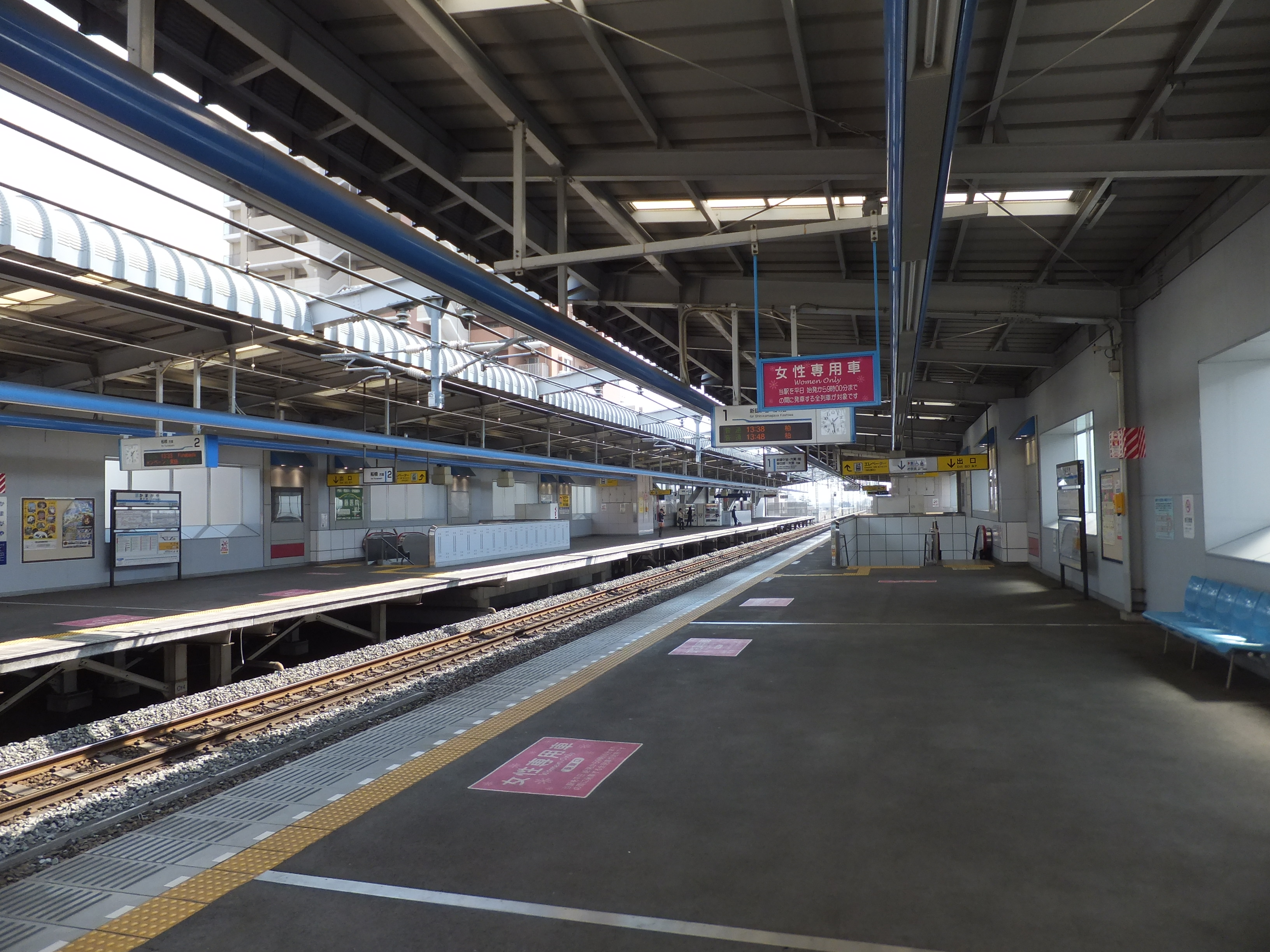
The platforms in April 2012

== History ==
Kamagaya Station opened on 27 December 1923.

From 17 March 2012, station numbering was introduced on all Tōbu lines, with Kamagaya Station becoming "TD-31".

== Passenger statistics ==
In fiscal 2017, the station was used by an average of 22,828 passengers daily.

== Surrounding area ==
- Kamagaya Post Office
- Michinobe Hachiman-gu Shrine
- Kamagaya High School

== See also ==
- List of railway stations in Japan
