= Magomezawa Station =

Railway station in Funabashi, Chiba Prefecture, Japan

TD32 Magonezawa Station 馬込沢駅
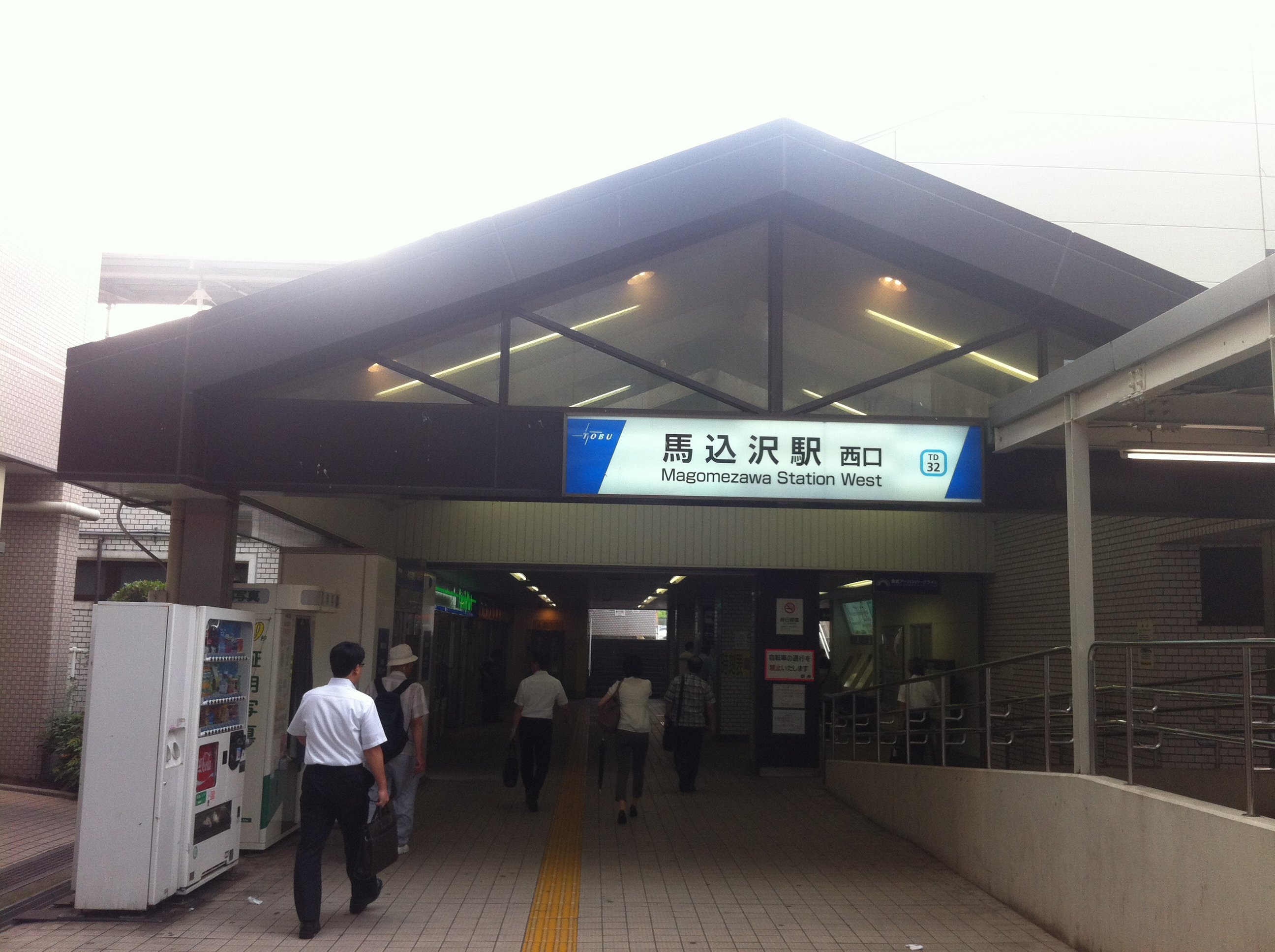
- West exit, Magomezawa Station, July 2014

General information
- Location: 7-2-1 Fujiwara, Funabashi-shi, Chiba-ken 283-0047; Japan
- Coordinates: 35.7416°N 139.9921°E
- Operator: Tobu Railway
- Line: Tobu Urban Park Line
- Distance: 57.7 km from Ōmiya
- Platforms: 2 side platforms

Other information
- Station code: TD-32
- Website: Official website

History
- Opened: 27 December 1923; 102 years ago
- Former names: Hōten (until 1924)

Passengers
- FY2019: 26,529 daily

Services
Preceding station	Tobu Railway	Following station
Kamagaya TD31 towards Ōmiya	Tōbu Urban Park Line Local	Tsukada TD33 towards Funabashi
Location
- Location within Chiba Prefecture Location within Japan

Magomezawa Station (馬込沢駅, Magomezawa-eki) is a passenger railway station in the city of Funabashi, Chiba, Japan, operated by the private railway operator Tōbu Railway. The station is numbered "TD-32".

== Lines ==
Magomezawa Station is served by Tobu Urban Park Line (also known as the Tōbu Noda Line), and lies 57.7 km (35.9 mi) from the western terminus of the line at Ōmiya Station.

== Station layout ==
The station consists of two opposed elevated side platforms serving two tracks, with the station located at ground level underneath.

=== Platforms ===
1	■ Tobu Urban Park Line	For Kashiwa, Nodashi, Kasukabe, Ōmiya
2	■ Tobu Urban Park Line	For Funabashi

== History ==
Magomezawa Station was opened on 27 December 1923, as Hōten Station (法典駅, Hōten-eki). It changed its name to its present name on 1 April 1924. The current station building dates from 1980. From 17 March 2012, station numbering was introduced on all Tobu lines, with Magomezawa Station becoming "TD-32".

== Passenger statistics ==
In fiscal 2019, the station was used by an average of 26,529 passengers daily.

== Surrounding area ==
Magomezawa Station is located in a residential area.

== See also ==
- List of railway stations in Japan
