= Onigoe Station =

Railway station in Ichikawa, Chiba Prefecture, Japan

KS17 Onigoe Station 鬼越駅
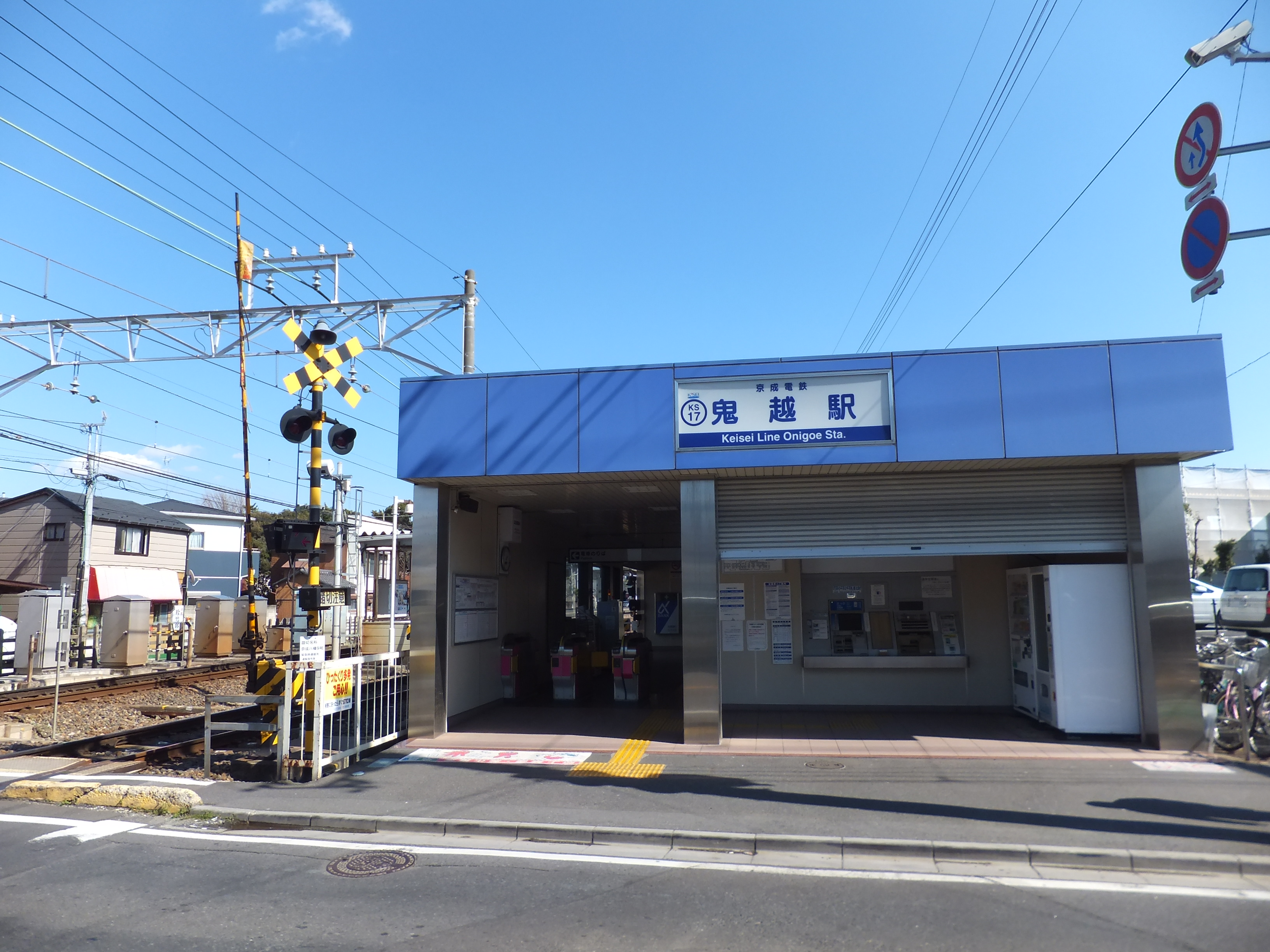
- Onigoe Station, March 2012

General information
- Location: 1-4-5 Onigoe, Ichikawa-shi, Chiba-ken 272-0022; Japan
- Coordinates: 35.7196°N 139.9380°E
- Operator: Keisei Electric Railway
- Line: Keisei Main Line
- Distance: 20.1 km from Keisei-Ueno
- Platforms: 1 island platform

Other information
- Station code: KS17
- Website: Official website

History
- Opened: October 3, 1935
- Former names: Nakayama-Onigoe (until 1935)

Passengers
- FY2019: 5,811

Services
Preceding station	Keisei	Following station
Keisei Yawata KS16 towards Keisei Ueno	Main Line Local	Keisei Nakayama KS18 towards Narita Airport Terminal 1
Location
- Location within Chiba Prefecture

Onigoe Station (鬼越駅, Onigoe-eki) is a passenger railway station on the Keisei Main Line in the city of Ichikawa, Chiba Japan, operated by the private railway operator Keisei Electric Railway.

== Lines ==
Onigoe Station is served by the Keisei Main Line, and is located 20.1 km from the terminus of the line at Keisei-Ueno Station.

== Station layout ==
The station consists of a single island platform connected via a footbridge to the station building.

=== Platforms ===
1	Keisei Main Line	for Keisei-Takasago, Nippori, and Keisei Ueno
2	Keisei Main Line	for Keisei Tsudanuma, Chiharadai, and Keisei Narita

== History ==
Onigoe Station opened on 3 October 1935 as Nakayama-Onigoe Station (中山鬼越駅, Nakayama-Onigoe eki). The station was renamed to its present name on 1 February 1943.

Station numbering was introduced to all Keisei Line stations on 17 July 2010. Keisei Sekiya was assigned station number KS17.

== Passenger statistics ==
In fiscal 2019, the station was used by an average of 5811 passengers daily.

== Surrounding area ==
- National Tax Agency Ichikawa Tax Office
- Higashiyama Kaii Memorial Hall
- Ichikawa Junior & Senior High School
- Ichikawa Municipal Fourth Junior High School

== See also ==
- List of railway stations in Japan
