= Ebi River =

Coordinates: 35°41′14.53″N 139°59′17.49″E

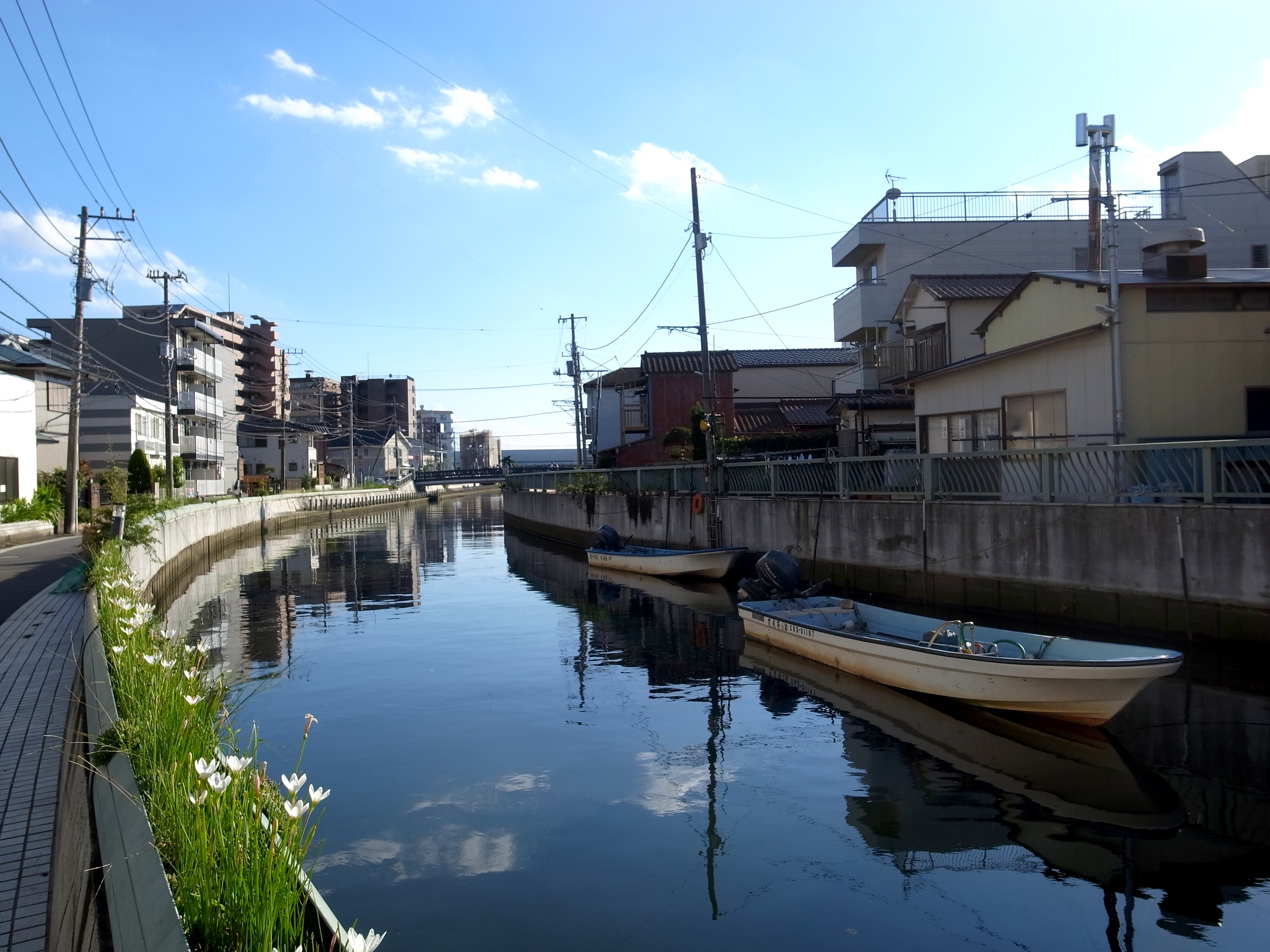
- A section of the Ebi River

- Native name: 海老川 (Japanese)

Location
- Country: Japan

Physical characteristics
- Source
  - location: Funabashi, Chiba Prefecture
- Mouth
  - location: Pacific Ocean
  - elevation: 0 m (0 ft)
- Length: 7.46 km (4.64 mi)

The Ebi River (海老川, Ebigawa) is a river in Funabashi, Chiba Prefecture, Japan. It is 2.67 kilometers (1.66 mi) in length and has a drainage area of 260 square kilometers (100 sq mi). Under the Japan Rivers Act of 1906 the river is designated as a Class 2 River. The Ebi originates near Takanechō district of Funabashi and flows directly south into Tokyo Bay. The river has numerous small tributaries and serves as an important part of the drainage network of Funabashi.

The Otakisan Konzō-ji temple of the Shingon Buzan sect is near the origin of the Ebi River. The Ebi River is known as a place to view cherry blossoms in spring.

== Origin of name ==
The Ebi River was called the Ōigawa River (太白川) earlier in history. It current name, "ebi", is the Japanese word for "shrimp". By legend the river was renamed when residents of the area presented Minamoto no Yoritomo with a gift of shrimp. The river was larger in the Edo period. Riverboats on the Ebi carried goods to and from the Edo capitol.

== Urbanization of Funabashi ==
The period of small-scale inland shipping on the Ebi River ended with the urbanization of Funabashi after World War II. The disappearance of forests, paddies, and other agricultural fields along the river, as well as the rapid increase of drainage water from housing developments caused significant water pollution and flooding. As a result of continuous flooding, the city of Funabashi announced a plan to improve conditions on the Ebi River in 2011.

Despite pollution problems, the Ebi is home to several fish species, including:

- mosquitofish
- stone moroko
- common carp
- crucian carp
- dojo loach

== Recreation ==
The Ebi River is home to thirteen small decorative bridges constructed by the city of Funabashi. The Ebi River has an extensive jogging trail, which was used by the Yuko Arimori, medalist in the 1992 Summer Olympics in Barcelona, Spain and the 1996 Summer Olympics in Atlanta, Georgia, United States. Her footprints are at a small monument along the jogging trail.

== Transportation ==
The Ebi River is a 20 minute walk from the Funabashi Station via the JR East Sōbu Main Line and the Tōbu Railway Noda Line.
