= Ichikawaōno Station =

Railway station in Ichikawa, Chiba Prefecture, Japan

JM12 Ichikawaōno Station 市川大野駅
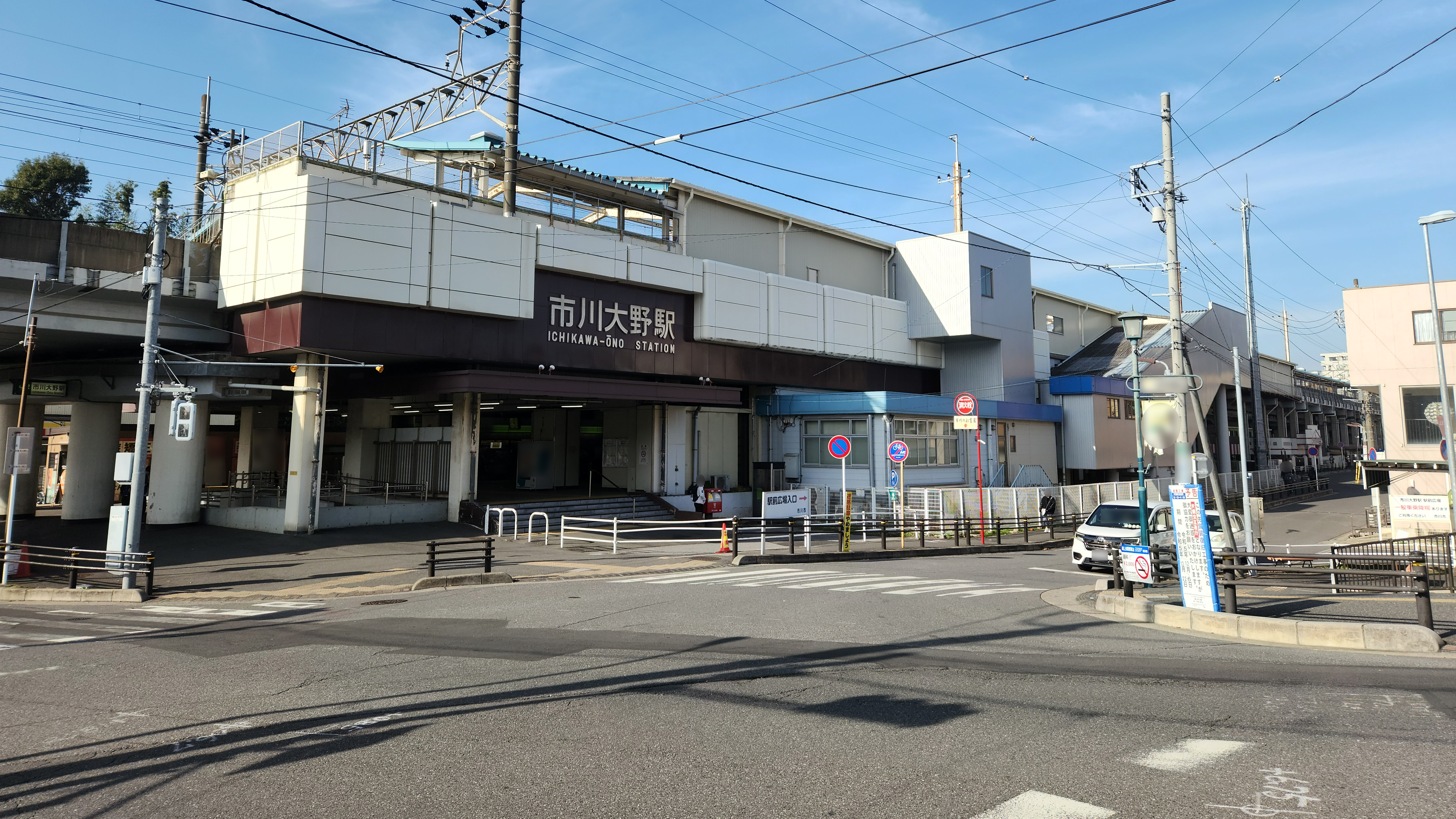
- Ichikawaōno Station in December 2023

General information
- Location: 3 Ōno-machi, Ichikawa-shi, Chiba-ken 272-0805; Japan
- Coordinates: 35°45′18.0684″N 139°57′5.0904″E
- Operator: JR East
- Line: Musashino Line
- Distance: 65.9 km from Fuchūhommachi
- Platforms: 2 side

Other information
- Status: Staffed
- Station code: JM12
- Website: Official website

History
- Opened: 2 October 1978

Passengers
- FY2019: 11,803 daily

Services
Preceding station	JR East	Following station
Higashi-Matsudo JM13 towards Ōmiya	Shimōsa	Funabashihōten JM11 towards Kaihimmakuhari
Higashi-Matsudo JM13 towards Fuchūhommachi	Musashino Line	Funabashihōten JM11 towards Kaihimmakuhari or Tokyo
Location
- Location within Chiba Prefecture Location within Japan

Ichikawaōno Station (市川大野駅, Ichikawa-Ōno-eki) is a passenger railway station in the city of Ichikawa, Chiba, Japan, operated by East Japan Railway Company (JR East).

== Lines ==
Ichikawaōno Station is served by the Musashino Line between Fuchūhommachi and Nishi-Funabashi, with some trains continuing to Tokyo via the Keiyō Line. It is located 65.9 kilometers from Fuchūhommachi Station.

== Station layout ==
The station consists of two elevated opposed side platforms serving two tracks, with an additional centre track used by freight services. The station building is located underneath the platforms.

=== Platforms ===
1	Musashino Line	for Shim-Matsudo, Minami-Koshigaya, Musashi-Urawa, Nishi-Kokubunji, and Fuchūhommachi
2	Musashino Line	for Nishi-Funabashi, Tokyo, and Kaihimmakuhari

== History ==
The station opened on 2 October 1978.

== Passenger statistics ==
In fiscal 2019, the station was used by an average of 11,803 passengers daily (boarding passengers only).

== Surrounding area ==
- Ichikawa City Zoo
- Manyō Botanical Gardens
- Higashi Matsudo Hospital

== See also ==
- List of railway stations in Japan
