= Funabashi =

Funabashi 船橋市
- Core city
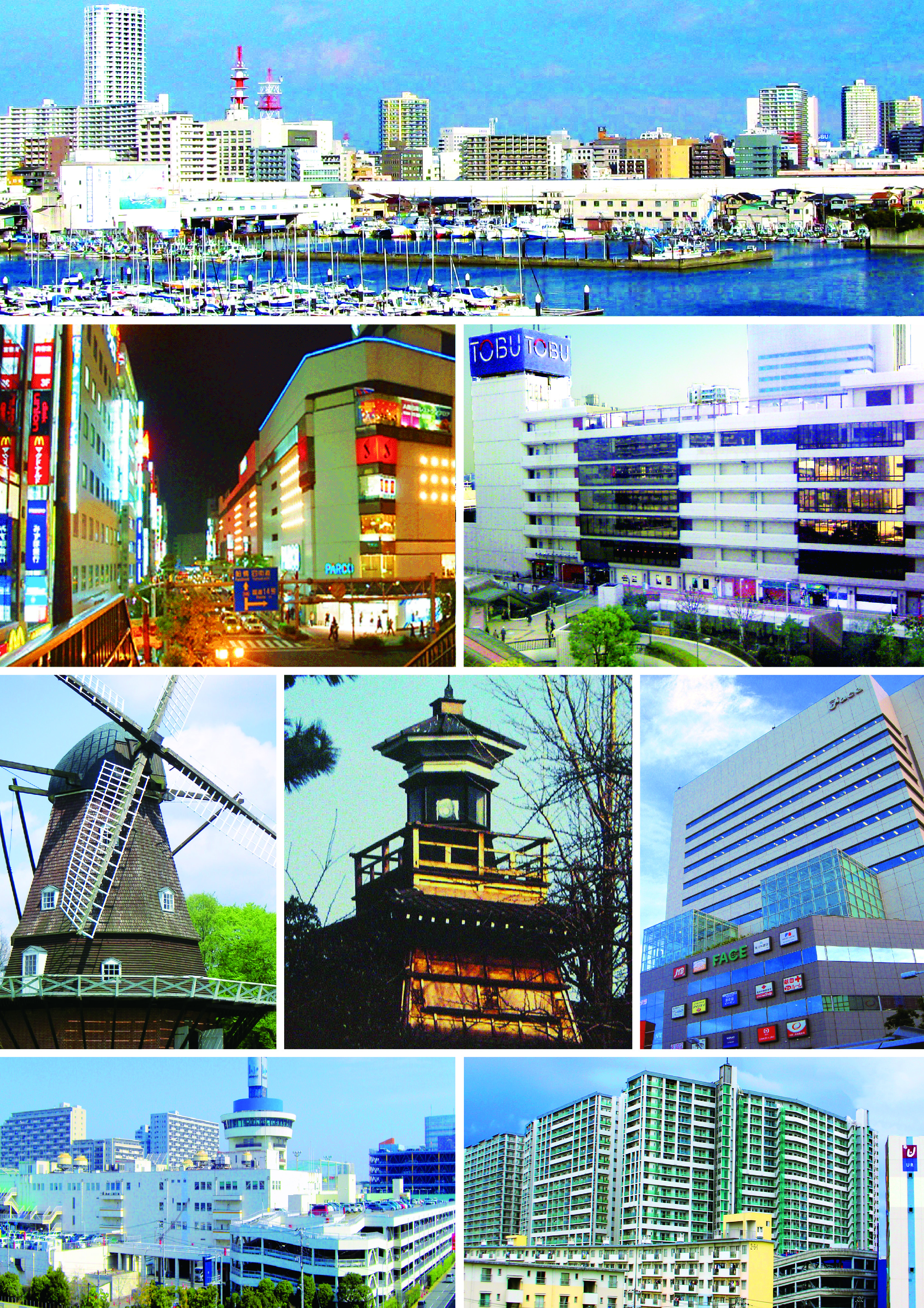
Chiba Port (Funabashi Port)）
View from Tsudanuma Station		Funabashi Station
Funabashi H. C. Andersen Park	Funabashi Ōmiya Jinja lighthouse	Funabashi Face Building
LaLaport Tokyo-Bay		Wakamiya Housing from Minami-Funabashi Station
- Flag Seal
- Interactive map of Funabashi
- Coordinates: 35°41′40.4″N 139°58′57.2″E
- Country: Japan
- Region: Kantō
- Prefecture: Chiba
- First official recorded: 110 AD
- City Settled: April 1, 1937

Government
  - Mayor: Toru Matsudo

Area
  - Total: 85.62 km^{2} (33.06 sq mi)

Population (December 1, 2020)
  - Total: 644,668
  - Density: 7,529/km^{2} (19,500/sq mi)
- Time zone: UTC+9 (Japan Standard Time)
- Postal code(s): 273 or 274
- Area code: 047-4
- Phone number: 047-436-2111
- Address: 2-10-25 Minato-cho, Funabashi-shi, 273-8501
- Climate: Cfa
- Website: Official website
- Symbols
- Flower: Camellia sasanqua
- Tree: Camellia sasanqua

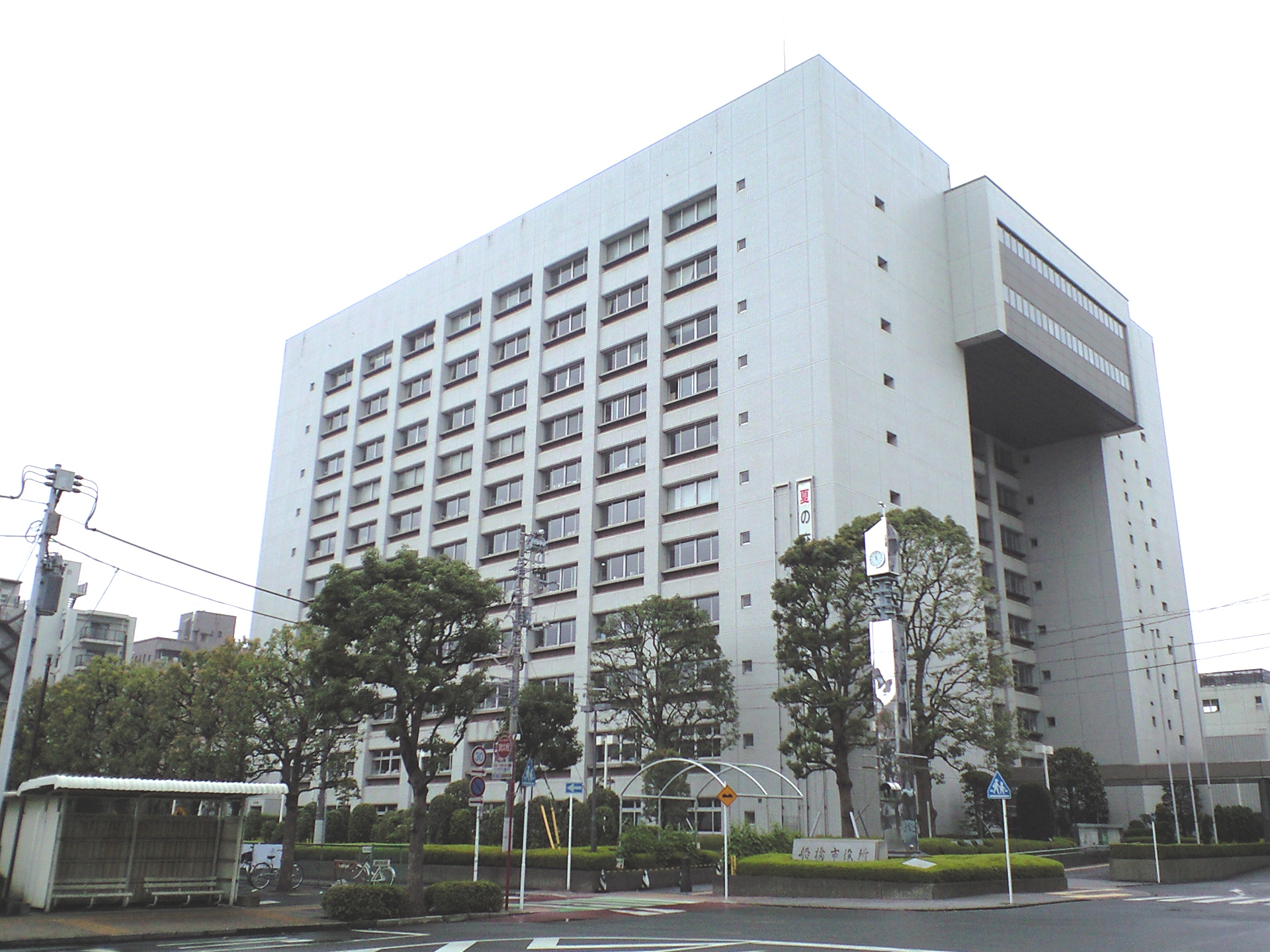
Funabashi City Hall

Funabashi (船橋市, Funabashi-shi) is a city located in Chiba Prefecture, Japan. As of 1 December 2020, the city had an estimated population of 644,668 in 309,238 households and a population density of 7,500 inhabitants per square kilometre (19,000/sq mi). The total area of the city is 85.62 square kilometres (33.06 sq mi). It is the Greater Tokyo Area's 7th most populated city (after passing Kawaguchi, Hachioji and Chiba), and second largest in Chiba Prefecture.

== Geography ==
Funabashi is located in northwestern Chiba Prefecture approximately 20 kilometers in either direction from the prefectural capital at Chiba and downtown Tokyo. The central area forms a flat diluvial upland of the Shimōsa Plateau. The city sits at an elevation of 20 to 30 meters above sea level, and is relatively flat. The highest point is 32.3 meters in Narashino 3-chome, and the lowest point is 0.2 meters in Minatomachi 1-chome. Funabashi is crossed by the Tone River, and the small Ebi River is located entirely within city limits. Funabashi formerly had wide, shallow beaches, but much of the coast has been industrialized and transformed by reclaimed land. The city extends for 13.86 kilometers east–west and 14.95 kilometers north–south.

=== Neighboring municipalities ===
Chiba Prefecture

- Ichikawa
- Kamagaya
- Narashino
- Shiroi
- Yachiyo

=== Climate ===
Funabashi has a humid subtropical climate (Köppen Cfa) characterized by warm summers and cool winters with light to no snowfall. The average annual temperature in Funabashi is 15.5 °C (59.9 °F). The average annual rainfall is 1,466.1 mm (57.72 in) with October as the wettest month. The temperatures are highest on average in August, at around 26.8 °C (80.2 °F), and lowest in January, at around 4.8 °C (40.6 °F).

Climate data for Funabashi (1999−2020 normals, extremes 1999−present)
Month	Jan	Feb	Mar	Apr	May	Jun	Jul	Aug	Sep	Oct	Nov	Dec	Year
Record high °C (°F)	18.6 (65.5)	24.7 (76.5)	25.2 (77.4)	27.1 (80.8)	33.2 (91.8)	34.8 (94.6)	38.0 (100.4)	39.0 (102.2)	35.9 (96.6)	32.2 (90.0)	25.2 (77.4)	23.5 (74.3)	39.0 (102.2)
Mean daily maximum °C (°F)	9.5 (49.1)	10.3 (50.5)	13.8 (56.8)	18.7 (65.7)	23.1 (73.6)	25.9 (78.6)	29.7 (85.5)	31.3 (88.3)	27.5 (81.5)	21.9 (71.4)	16.7 (62.1)	11.7 (53.1)	20.0 (68.0)
Daily mean °C (°F)	4.8 (40.6)	5.7 (42.3)	9.0 (48.2)	13.8 (56.8)	18.5 (65.3)	21.6 (70.9)	25.4 (77.7)	26.8 (80.2)	23.4 (74.1)	17.8 (64.0)	12.2 (54.0)	7.1 (44.8)	15.5 (59.9)
Mean daily minimum °C (°F)	0.4 (32.7)	1.4 (34.5)	4.4 (39.9)	9.3 (48.7)	14.5 (58.1)	18.4 (65.1)	22.4 (72.3)	23.7 (74.7)	20.2 (68.4)	14.3 (57.7)	8.2 (46.8)	2.8 (37.0)	11.7 (53.0)
Record low °C (°F)	−5.4 (22.3)	−4.7 (23.5)	−2.0 (28.4)	−0.6 (30.9)	7.4 (45.3)	10.7 (51.3)	15.7 (60.3)	16.6 (61.9)	9.5 (49.1)	6.0 (42.8)	−1.1 (30.0)	−3.6 (25.5)	−5.4 (22.3)
Average precipitation mm (inches)	63.0 (2.48)	61.4 (2.42)	103.0 (4.06)	114.5 (4.51)	129.8 (5.11)	155.3 (6.11)	121.9 (4.80)	111.4 (4.39)	189.7 (7.47)	239.9 (9.44)	97.4 (3.83)	63.3 (2.49)	1,466.1 (57.72)
Average precipitation days (≥ 1.0 mm)	4.9	6.2	9.5	10.0	10.2	11.7	9.8	7.8	10.9	10.9	8.4	5.9	106.2
Mean monthly sunshine hours	192.0	166.0	182.8	185.3	185.3	128.0	162.6	194.1	143.8	137.7	145.9	177.3	1,999.9
Source: Japan Meteorological Agency

== Demographics ==
Per Japanese census data, the population of Funabashi has increased rapidly over the past century.

Historical population
Year	Pop.	±%
1920	34,119	—
1930	46,644	+36.7%
1940	61,624	+32.1%
1950	100,134	+62.5%
1960	135,038	+34.9%
1970	325,426	+141.0%
1980	497,439	+52.9%
1990	533,270	+7.2%
2000	550,074	+3.2%
2010	609,040	+10.7%
2020	642,907	+5.6%

== History ==
The name "Funabashi" is mentioned in the Kamakura period chronicle Azuma Kagami. However, the name itself is even more ancient, dating from before the Nara period and the Yamatotakeru mythology. Archaeologists have found stone tools from the Japanese Paleolithic period and shell middens from the Jōmon period in the area, indicating continuous inhabitation for thousands of years. A number of Shinto shrines and Buddhist temples in the area claim to have been founded in the Nara period or Heian period. During the Muromachi periods, the area was controlled by the Chiba clan. During the Sengoku period, the Chiba clan fought the Satomi clan to the south, and the Late Hōjō clan to the west. After the defeat of the Chiba clan, the area came within the control of Tokugawa Ieyasu.

Under the Tokugawa shogunate, the area prospered as a post town on the river crossing of the Tone River, and was largely retained as tenryō under the direct control of the Shogunate and administered through a number of hatamoto. The area was also a favored hunting grounds for the Shōgun. During the Boshin War of the Meiji Restoration, Funabashi was the location of a minor skirmish between Tokugawa loyalists under Enomoto Takeaki and the pro-Imperial forces of Okayama Domain and Satsuma Domain, during which most of the town burned down.

After the abolition of the han system, the area eventually became part of Chiba Prefecture. Funabashi Town was one of several towns and villages created on April 1, 1889, under Inba District with the establishment of the modern municipalities system. The area developed rapidly due to its proximity to Tokyo and the presence of numerous military facilities in the area. On April 1, 1937, Funabashi was elevated to city status through merger with neighboring Katsushika Town and Yasakae, Hoden and Tsukada Villages. The new city was host to numerous military installations in World War II, and was bombed in the air raids on Japan in 1945.

The city developed rapidly in the postwar period, with the development of industries, public housing developments and port facilities. With the annexation of neighboring Ninomiya Town in 1953, the population exceeded 100,000. The population exceeded 300,000 in 1969 and 500,000 in 1982. Funabashi was designated a core city on April 1, 2005, with increased local autonomy from the central government. The population exceeded 600,000 in 2006.

== Government ==
Funabashi has a mayor-council form of government with a directly elected mayor and a unicameral city council of 50 members. Funabashi contributes seven members to the Chiba Prefectural Assembly. In terms of national politics, the city is divided between the Chiba 4th district and the Chiba 14th district of the lower house of the Diet of Japan.

== Economy ==
Funabashi is a regional commercial center and, due to its numerous train connections, a bedroom community for nearby Chiba and Tokyo. Approximately 34.5% of the working population commutes to Tokyo, per the 2015 census.

=== Companies from Funabashi ===
- Mugen Seiki - a remote control car manufacturer

== Education ==
- Nihon University branch campus
- Funabashi has 54 public elementary schools and 27 public middle schools operated by the city government, and 11 public high schools operated by the Chiba Prefectural Board of Education. There are also one private elementary school, one private middle school and four private high schools. The prefecture also operates one special education school for the handicapped.

== Transportation ==
=== Railway ===
JR East – Musashino Line

- Funabashihōten - Nishi-Funabashi

JR East – Keiyō Line

- Nishi-Funabashi ->>- Minami-Funabashi

JR East – Chūō-Sōbu Line

- Higashi-Funabashi - Funabashi - Nishi-Funabashi - Shimōsa-Nakayama

Keisei Electric Railway - Keisei Main Line

- Keisei Nakayama - Higashi-Nakayama - Keisei-Nishifuna - Kaijin - Keisei Funabashi - Daijingūshita - Funabashi-Keibajō

Keisei Electric Railway - Keisei Matsudo Line

- Futawamukōdai - Misaki - Takifudō - Takanekōdan- Takanekido - Kita-Narashino - Narashino- Yakuendai - Maebara

Hokusō Railway -Hokusō Line

- Komuro

Tobu Railway – Tobu Noda Line

- Magomezawa - Tsukada - Shin-Funabashi - Funabashi

Tōyō Rapid Railway - Tōyō Rapid Line

- Nishi-Funabashi - Higashi-Kaijin - Hasama - Kita-Narashino - Funabashi-Nichidaimae

Tokyo Metro Tōzai Line

- Baraki-Nakayama - Nishi-Funabashi

=== Highway ===
- Keiyō Road
- Higashi-Kantō Expressway
- National Route 14
- National Route 16
- National Route 296
- National Route 357
- National Route 464

== Sister cities ==
- Hayward, California, United States, since November 7, 1986
- Odense, Denmark, since April 6, 1989
- Xi'an, Shaanxi, China, since November 2, 1994

== Local attractions ==
=== Notable structures ===
- Funabashi Racecourse
- Funabashi Sports Park Arena, playground of the Chiba Jets
- Nakayama Racecourse
- LaLaPort shopping mall, one of the largest in Japan
- SSAWS indoor ski slope (closed and demolished in 2003)
- Japan's first large-format IKEA store, built on the site of SSAWS

=== Notable places ===
- Cherry blossoms on the Ebi River
- Funabashi Shrine
- Gyōda Musen
- Kūtei-kan
- Meiji Tennō Chūhitsu no Tokoro no Hi
- Narashinohara
- Ninomiya Jinja
- Nishonoseki stable

== Notable people from Funabashi ==
- Hiroki Aiba, dancer and singer
- Kazuyuki Fujita, professional wrestler
- Funassyi, unofficial city mascot
- Arisa Hoshiki, Former professional wrestler, singer under the alter ego Udon Sato
- Sayaka Ichii, musician
- Atsushi Itō, actor
- Yuko Kavaguti, figure skater
- Mai Kuraki, singer
- Fumie Kurotori, swimmer
- Minori Matsushima, voice Actress
- Mai Minokoshi, professional tennis player
- Manabu Namiki, video game designer
- Yoshihiro Natsuka, professional soccer player
- Katsuhiko Nishijima, Anime director
- Michiko Nishiwaki, actress, stunt woman
- Yoshihiko Noda, politician, former Prime Minister of Japan
- Hanako Oku, musician
- Toru Oniki, professional soccer manager and former player
- Shunzo Ono, professional soccer player
- Manabu Orido, racing driver
- Tamao Satō, actress
- Takashi Sekizuka, professional soccer player
- Mariko Shiga, musician
- Rin Takanashi, film and television actress
- Keiko Terada, singer (Show-Ya)
- Akeno Watanabe, voice actress
- Azusa Yamamoto, gravure idol
- Tomohisa Yamashita, musician
- Risa Yoshiki, model, actress, singer

== Eponym ==
- In 2018, asteroid 25892 Funabashi was named for the city.
