= Kamihongō Station =

Railway station in Matsudo, Chiba Prefecture, Japan

KS87 Kamihongō Station 上本郷駅
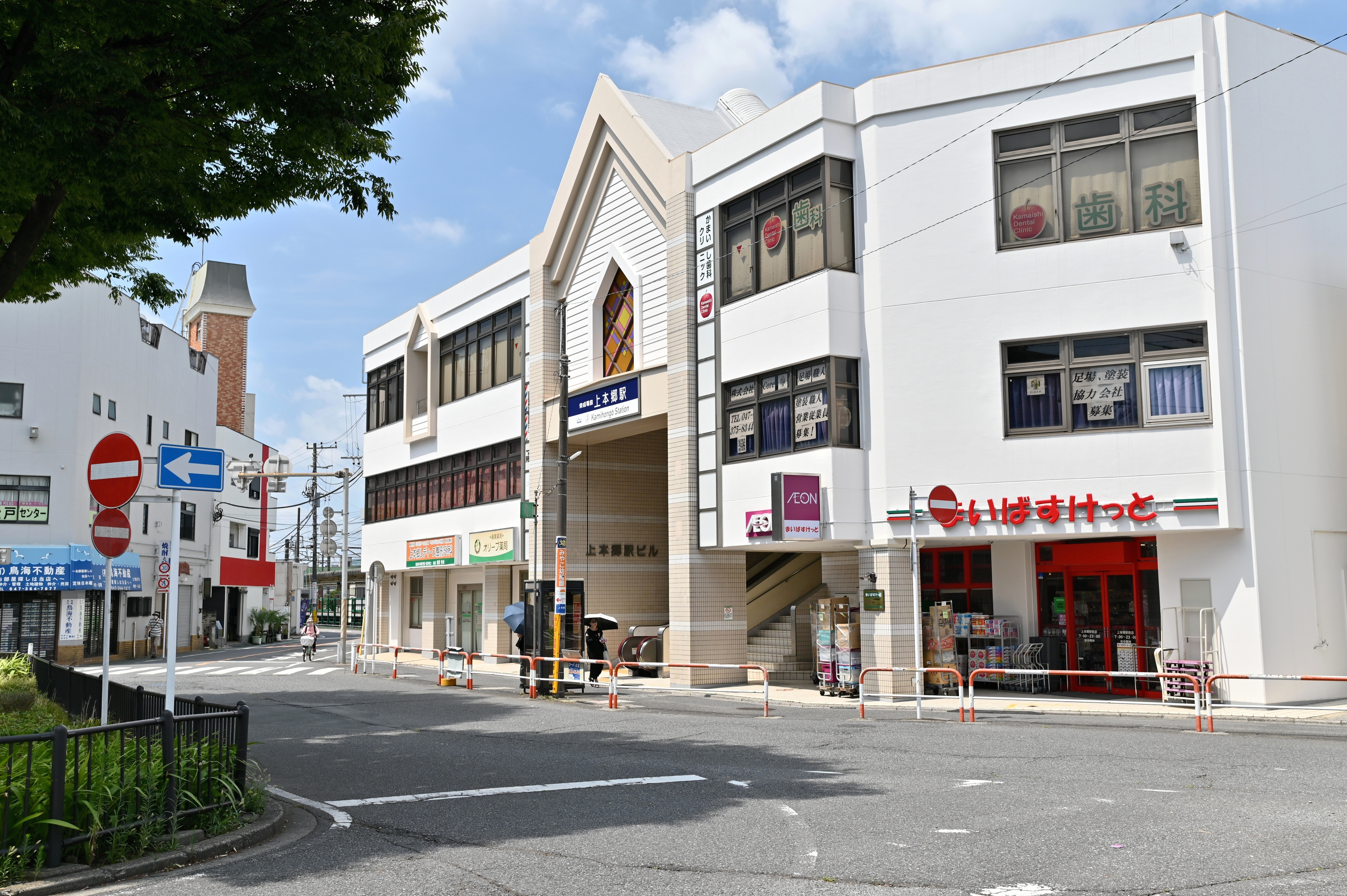
- South Exit of Kamihongō Station, August 2025

General information
- Location: 2648-11 Kamihongō, Matsudo-shi, Chiba-ken 271-0064; Japan
- Coordinates: 35°47′23″N 139°54′59″E
- Operator: Keisei Electric Railway
- Line: Keisei Matsudo Line
- Distance: 1.7 km (1.1 mi) from Matsudo
- Platforms: 1 island platform
- Tracks: 2

Construction
- Structure type: At grade

Other information
- Station code: ○KS87
- Website: Official website

History
- Opened: 21 April 1955; 71 years ago

Passengers
- FY2017: 7181 daily

Services
Preceding station	Keisei	Following station
Matsudo KS88 Terminus	Matsudo Line	Matsudo-Shinden KS86 towards Keisei Tsudanuma
Location
- Location within Chiba Prefecture Location within Japan

Kamihongō Station (上本郷駅, Kamihongō-eki) is a railway station located in the city of Matsudo, Chiba Prefecture, Japan, operated by the private railway operator Keisei Electric Railway.

== Lines ==
Kamihongō Station is served by the Keisei Matsudo Line, and is located 1.7 kilometers from the western terminus of the line at Matsudo Station.

== Station layout ==
The station consists of a single island platform, with an elevated station house.

=== Platforms ===
1	■ Keisei Matsudo Line	For Yabashira, Shin-Kamagaya, Keisei-Tsudanuma
2	■ Keisei Matsudo Line	For Matsudo

== History ==
Kamihongō Station was opened on 21 April 1955 on the Shin-Keisei Railway.

Effective April 2025, the station came under the aegis of Keisei Electric Railway as the result of the buyout of the Shin-Keisei Railway. The move was completed on 1 April 2025.

== Passenger statistics ==
In fiscal 2018, the station was used by an average of 7181 passengers daily.

== Surrounding area ==
- Matsudo City Fire Department Central Fire Department
- Matsudo City Akira Civic Center
- Matsudo City Library Akira Annex
- Matsudo City General Hospital School of Nursing
- Senshu University Matsudo Junior and Senior High School

== See also ==
- List of railway stations in Japan
