= Matsudo-Shinden Station =

Railway station in Matsudo, Chiba Prefecture, Japan

KS86 Matsudo-Shinden Station 松戸新田駅
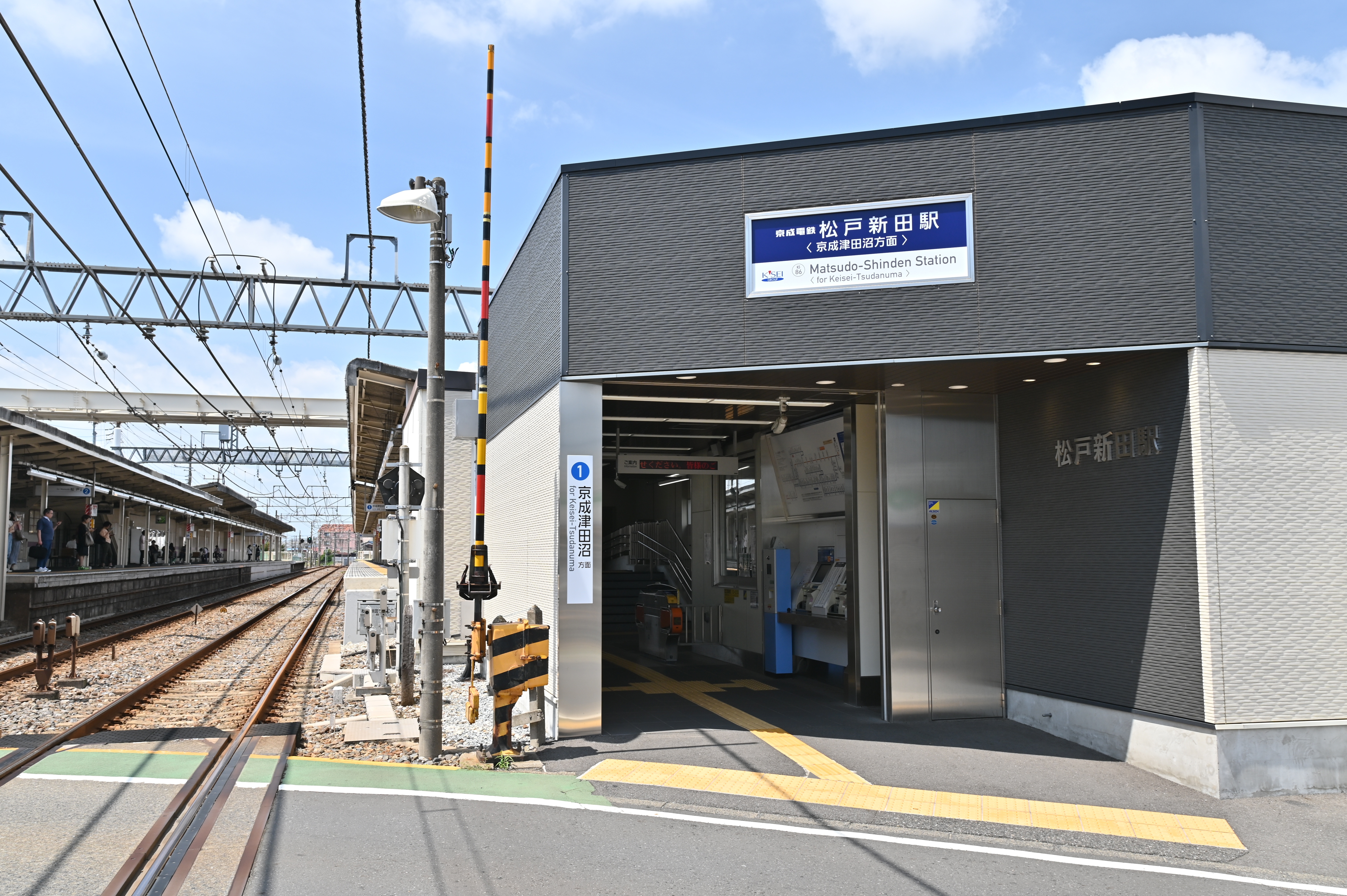
- The north exit in August 2025

General information
- Location: 264-2 Matsudo-Shinden, Matsudo-shi, Chiba-ken 270-2241; Japan
- Coordinates: 35.7906°N 139.9227°E
- Operator: Keisei Electric Railway
- Line: Keisei Matsudo Line
- Distance: 2.4 km (1.5 mi) from Matsudo
- Platforms: 2 side platforms
- Tracks: 2

Construction
- Structure type: At grade

Other information
- Station code: ○KS86
- Website: Official website

History
- Opened: 21 April 1955; 71 years ago

Passengers
- FY2018: 6668 daily

Services
| Preceding station | Keisei | Following station |
|---|---|---|
| Kamihongō KS87 towards Matsudo | Matsudo Line | Minoridai KS85 towards Keisei Tsudanuma |
Location
- Location within Chiba Prefecture Location within Japan

Matsudo-Shinden Station (松戸新田駅, Matsudo-Shinden-eki) is a passenger railway station located in the city of Matsudo, Chiba Prefecture, Japan, operated by the private railway operator Keisei Electric Railway.

== Lines ==
Matsudo-Shinden Station is served by the Keisei Matsudo Line, and is located 2.4 kilometers from the terminus of the line at Matsudo Station.

== Station layout ==
The station consists of dual opposed side platforms, connected by a footbridge.

=== Platforms ===
| 1 | ■ Keisei Matsudo Line | For Yabashira, Shin-Kamagaya, Keisei-Tsudanuma |
| 2 | ■ Keisei Matsudo Line | For Matsudo |

== History ==
Matsudo-Shinden Station was opened on 21 April 1955 on the Shin-Keisei Railway. A new station building was completed in 2007.

Effective April 2025, the station came under the aegis of Keisei Electric Railway as the result of the buyout of the Shin-Keisei Railway. The move was completed on 1 April 2025.

== Passenger statistics ==
In fiscal 2018, the station was used by an average of 6668 passengers daily.

== Surrounding area ==
- Matsudo Driving School
- Matsudo City General Hospital
- Matsudo City General Hospital School of Nursing
- Senshu University Matsudo Junior and Senior High School
- Chiba Prefectural Matsudo High School
- Matsudo City No. 6 Junior High School

== See also ==
- List of railway stations in Japan
