= Minoridai Station =

Railway station in Matsudo, Chiba Prefecture, Japan

KS85 Minoridai Station みのり台駅
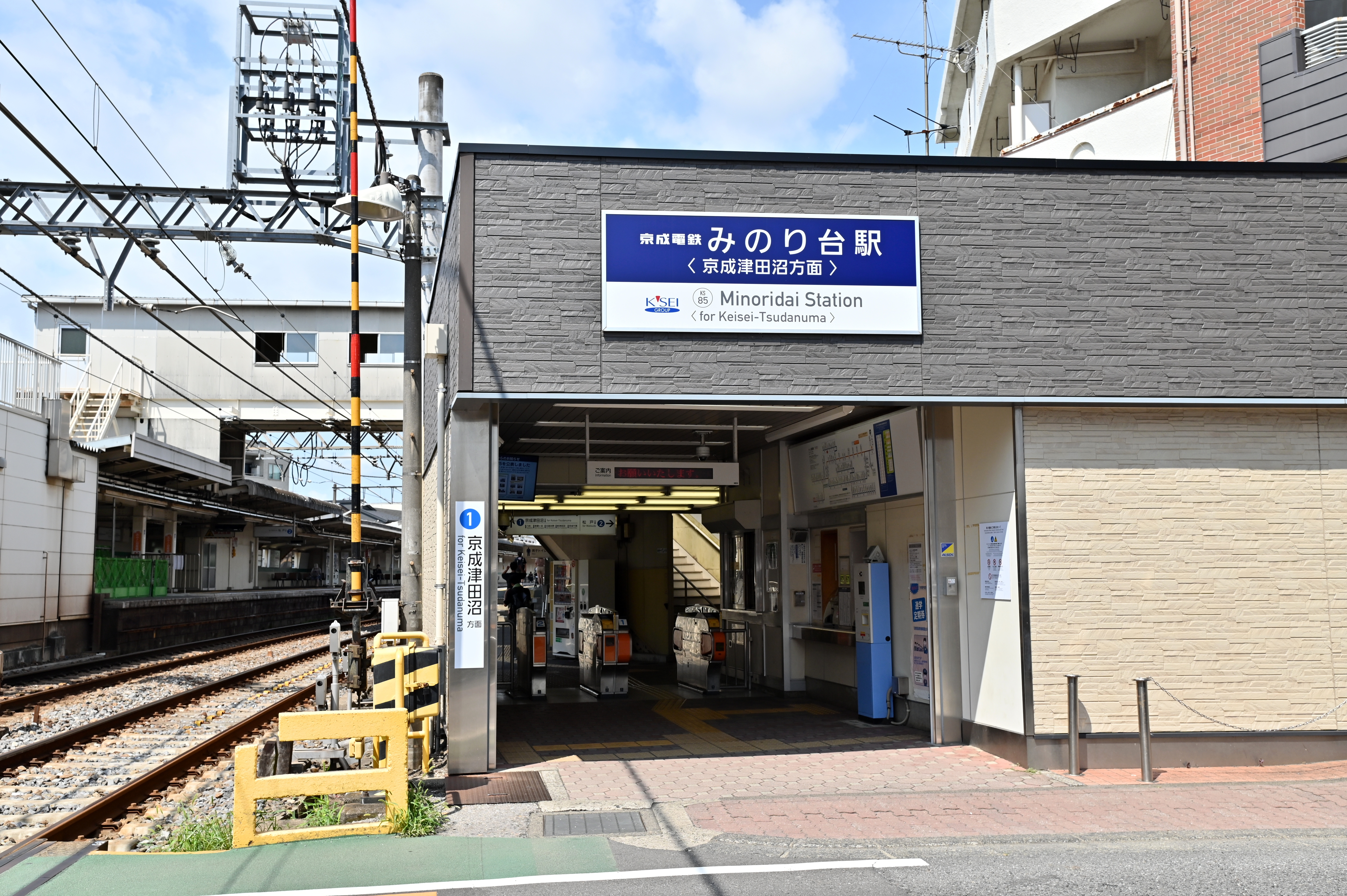
- The north entrance to the station in August 2025

General information
- Location: 575-19 Matsudo-Shinden, Matsudo, Chiba Prefecture 270-2241; Japan
- Coordinates: 35.7892°N 139.9293°E
- Operator: Keisei Electric Railway
- Line: Keisei Matsudo Line
- Distance: 3.0 km (1.9 mi) from Matsudo
- Platforms: 2 side platforms
- Tracks: 2

Construction
- Structure type: At grade

Other information
- Station code: ○KS85
- Website: Official website

History
- Opened: 21 April 1955; 71 years ago

Passengers
- FY2018: 8785 daily

Services
Preceding station	Keisei	Following station
Matsudo-Shinden KS86 towards Matsudo	Matsudo Line	Yabashira KS84 towards Keisei Tsudanuma
Location
- Location within Chiba Prefecture Location within Japan

Minoridai Station (みのり台駅, Minoridai-eki) is a passenger railway station located in the city of Matsudo, Chiba Prefecture, Japan, operated by the private railway operator Keisei Electric Railway.

== Lines ==
Minoridai Station is served by the Keisei Matsudo Line, and is located 3.0 kilometers from the terminus of the line at Matsudo Station.

== Station layout ==
The station consists of dual opposed side platforms, connected by a footbridge.

=== Platforms ===
1	■ Keisei Matsudo Line	For Yabashira, Shin-Kamagaya, Keisei-Tsudanuma
2	■ Keisei Matsudo Line	For Matsudo

== History ==
Minoridai Station was opened on 21 April 1955 on the Shin-Keisei Electric Railway.

Effective April 2025, the station came under the aegis of Keisei Electric Railway as the result of the buyout of the Shin-Keisei Railway. The move was completed on 1 April 2025.

== Passenger statistics ==
In fiscal 2018, the station was used by an average of 8785 passengers daily.

== Surrounding area ==
- Matsudo City Minoridai Civic Center
- Matsudo City Library Minoridai Annex
- Matsudo City No. 6 Junior High School
- Matsudo City Minoridai Elementary School

== See also ==
- List of railway stations in Japan
