= Tokiwadaira Station =

Railway station in Matsudo, Chiba Prefecture, Japan

KS83 Tokiwadaira Station 常盤平駅
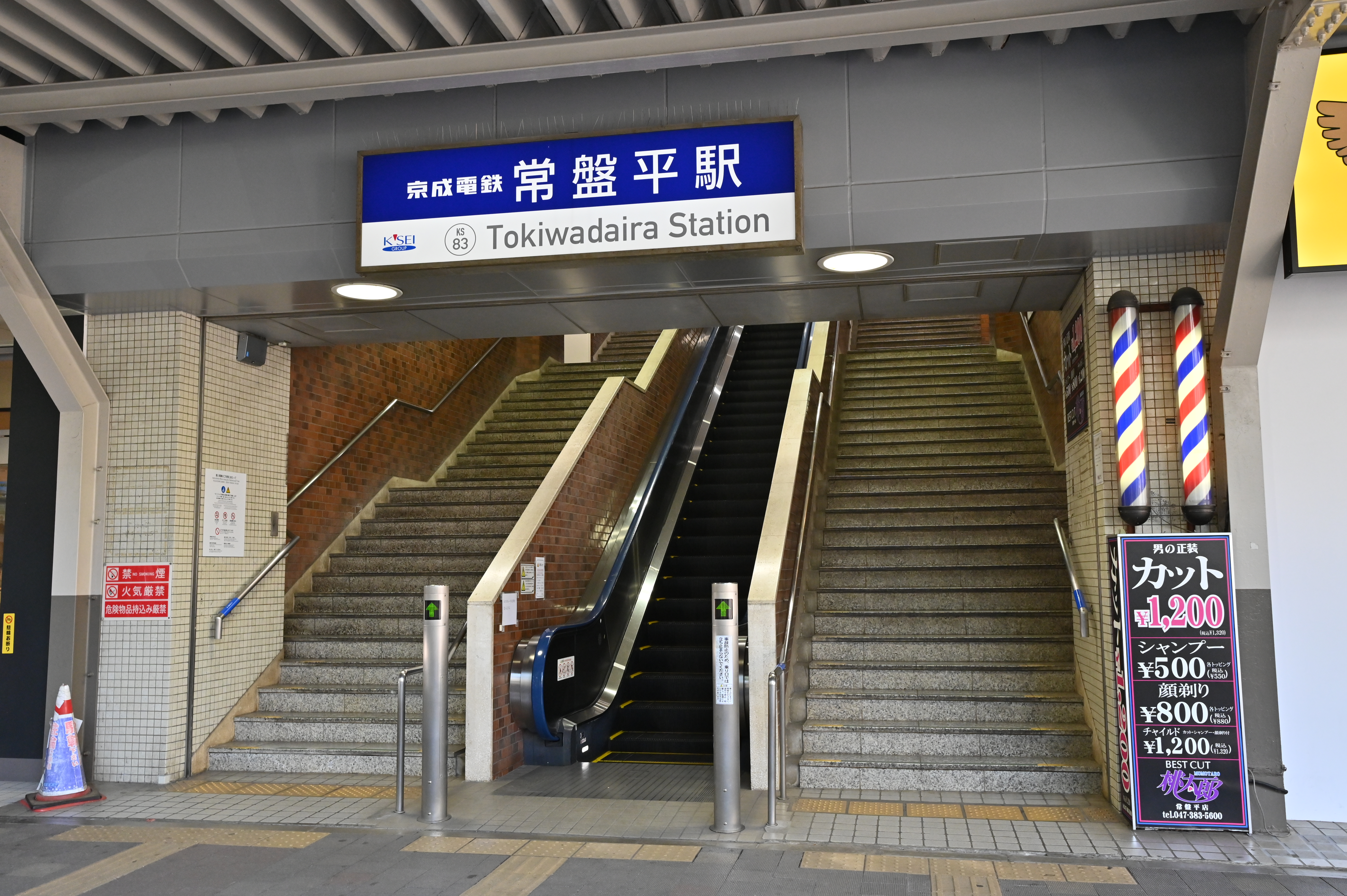
- South exit of the station in August 2025

General information
- Location: 1-29 Tokiwadaira, Matsudo-shi, Chiba-ken 270-2261; Japan
- Coordinates: 35.8033°N 139.9494°E
- Operator: Keisei Electric Railway
- Line: Keisei Matsudo Line
- Distance: 5.6 km (3.5 mi) from Matsudo
- Platforms: 1 island platform

Construction
- Structure type: At grade

Other information
- Station code: ○KS83
- Website: Official website

History
- Opened: 21 April 1955; 71 years ago
- Former names: Kanegasaku (until 1960)

Passengers
- 2018: 18,874 daily

Services
Preceding station	Keisei	Following station
Yabashira KS84 towards Matsudo	Matsudo Line	Gokō KS82 towards Keisei Tsudanuma
Location
- Location within Chiba Prefecture Location within Japan

Tokiwadaira Station (常盤平駅, Tokiwadaira-eki) is a passenger railway station located in the city of Matsudo, Chiba Prefecture, Japan, operated by the private railway operator Keisei Electric Railway.

== Lines ==
Tokiwadaira Station is served by the Keisei Matsudo Line, and is located 5.6 kilometers from the terminus of the line at Matsudo Station.

== Station layout ==
Tokiwadaira Station consists of a single island platform, with an elevated station building.

=== Platforms ===
1	Keisei Matsudo Line	for Shin-Kamagaya, Shin-Tsudanuma, and Keisei-Tsudanuma; Keisei Chiba Line for Chiba Chūō
2	Keisei Matsudo Line	for Yabashira and Matsudo

== History ==
Tokiwadaira Station was opened on the Shin-Keisei Electric Railway on 21 April 1955 as Kanegasaku Station (金ヶ作駅, Kanegasaku-eki). It changed its name to its present name on 1 February 1960.

Effective April 2025, the station came under the aegis of Keisei Electric Railway as the result of the buyout of the Shin-Keisei Railway. The move was completed on 1 April 2025.

== Passenger statistics ==
In fiscal 2018, the station was used by an average of 18,874 passengers daily.

== Surrounding area ==
- Chiba Prefectural West Library
- Matsudo Municipal Museum
- Chiba West General Hospital
- Tokiwadaira Sakura Dori
- Tokiwa Hirakeyaki Dori
- Matsudo City Hall Tokiwadaira Branch

== See also ==
- List of railway stations in Japan
