= Yabashira Station =

Railway station in Matsudo, Chiba prefecture, Japan

KS84 Yabashira Station 八柱駅
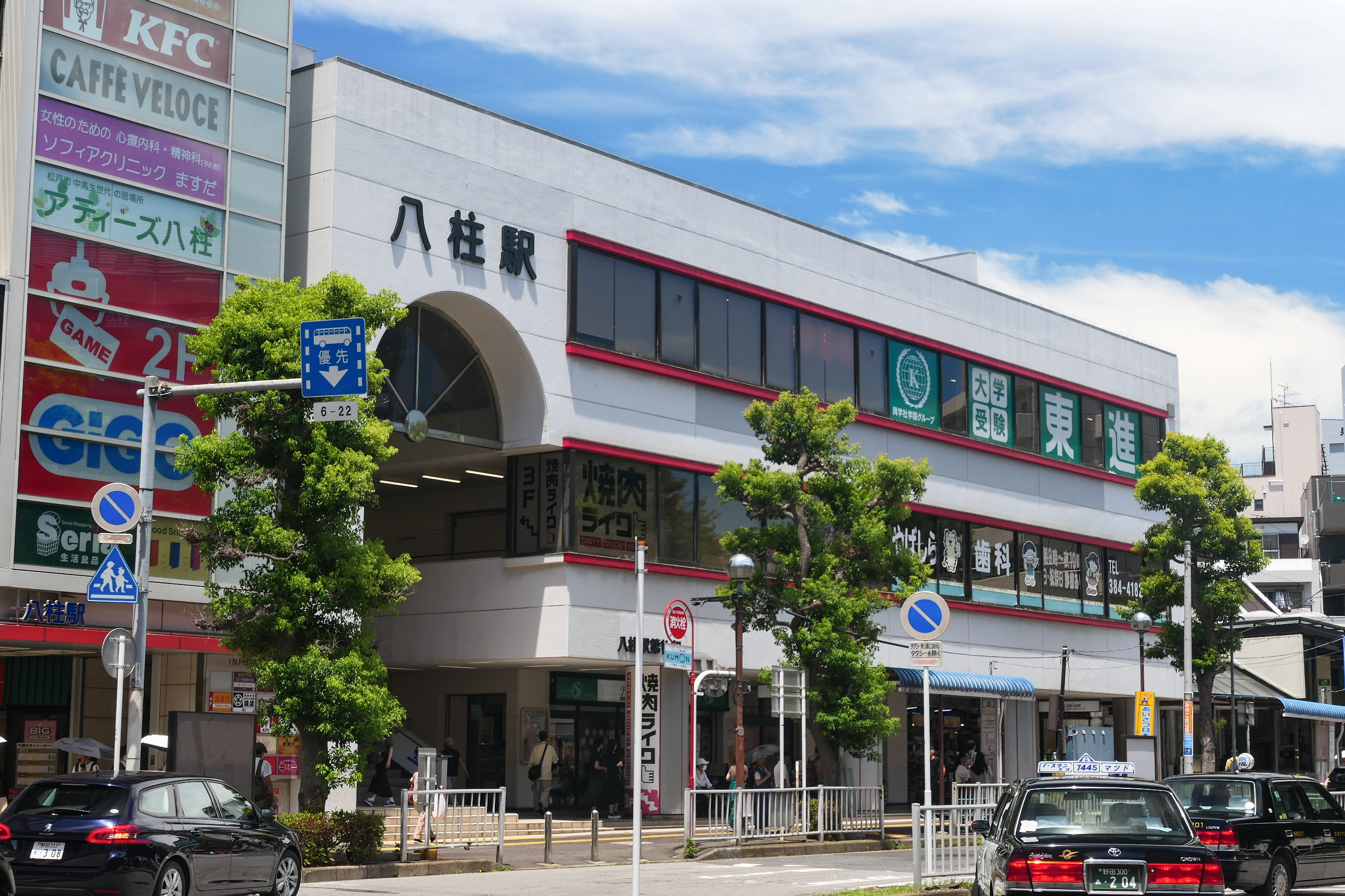
- South exit of the station in July 2025

General information
- Location: 1-1-16 Higurashi, Matsudo-shi, Chiba-ken 270-2253; Japan
- Coordinates: 35.7915°N 139.9374°E
- Operator: Keisei Electric Railway
- Line: Keisei Matsudo Line
- Distance: 3.8 km (2.4 mi) from Matsudo
- Platforms: 1 island platform
- Tracks: 2
- Connections: JM14 Shin-Yahashira Station

Construction
- Structure type: At grade

Other information
- Station code: ○KS84
- Website: Official website

History
- Opened: 21 April 1955; 71 years ago

Passengers
- FY2018: 45,631 daily

Services
Preceding station	Keisei	Following station
Minoridai KS85 towards Matsudo	Matsudo Line	Tokiwadaira KS83 towards Keisei Tsudanuma
Location
- Location within Chiba Prefecture Location within Japan

Yabashira Station (八柱駅, Yabashira-eki) is a passenger railway station located in the city of Matsudo, Chiba Prefecture, Japan, operated by the private railway operator Keisei Electric Railway.

== Lines ==
Yabashira Station is served by the Keisei Matsudo Line, and is located 3.8 kilometers from the terminus of the line at Matsudo Station.

== Station layout ==
The station consists of a single island platform, with an elevated station building. The station is adjacent to, but not directly connected to the Shin-Yahashira Station of the JR East’s Musashino Line.

=== Platforms ===
1	Keisei Matsudo Line	for Shin-Kamagaya, Shin-Tsudanuma, and Keisei-Tsudanuma; Keisei Chiba Line for Chiba Chūō
2	Keisei Matsudo Line	for Matsudo

== History ==
Yabashira Station was opened on 21 April 1955 on the Shin-Keisei Electric Railway. A new station building was completed in 2003.

Effective April 2025, the station came under the aegis of Keisei Electric Railway as the result of the buyout of the Shin-Keisei Railway. The move was completed on 1 April 2025.

== Passenger statistics ==
In fiscal 2018, the station was used by an average of 45,631 passengers daily.

== Surrounding area ==
- Shin-Yahashira Station (Musashino Line)
- Chiba West General Hospital
- Matsudo City General Hospital
- Matsudo City No. 6 Junior High School
- Matsudo City Kanfudai Elementary School

== See also ==
- List of railway stations in Japan
