= Sōgosandō Station =

Railway station in Shisui, Chiba Prefecture, Japan

KS38 Sōgosandō Station 宗吾参道駅
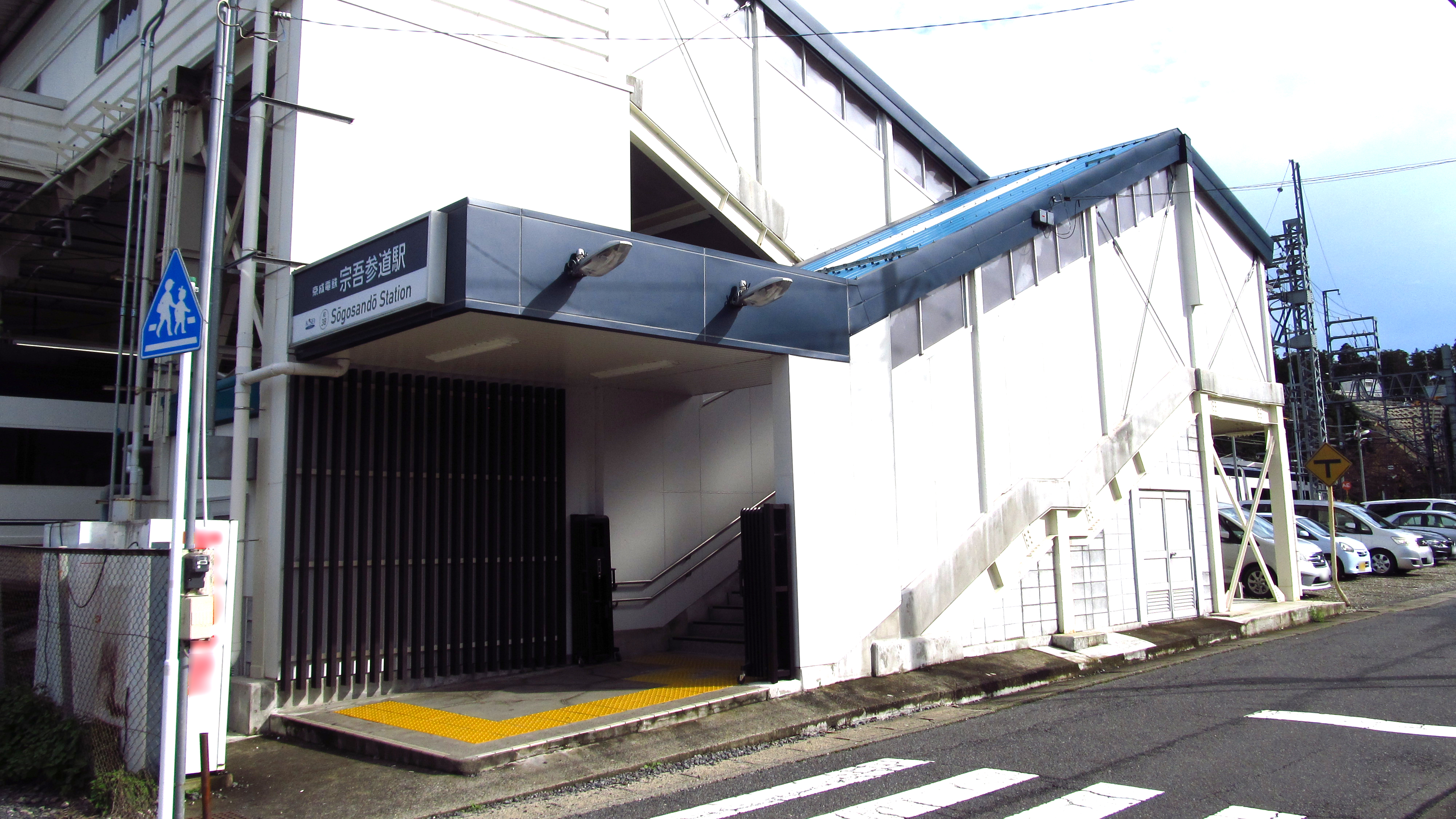
- The east-side entrance to the station in July 2020

General information
- Location: 432-3 Nakata, Shimo-Iwahashi, Shisui-machi, Inba-gun, Chiba-ken 285-0907; Japan
- Coordinates: 35.7531°N 140.2804°E
- Operator: Keisei Electric Railway
- Line: Keisei Main Line
- Distance: 57.0 km from Keisei-Ueno
- Platforms: 1 side + 1 island platform
- Tracks: 3

Other information
- Station code: KS38
- Website: Official website

History
- Opened: April 1, 1928
- Former names: Sōgo (until 1951)

Passengers
- 2019: 2,757 daily

Services
Preceding station	Keisei	Following station
Keisei Shisui KS37 towards Keisei Ueno	Main Line Limited Express Commuter Express Rapid Local	Kōzunomori KS39 towards Narita Airport Terminal 1
Location
- Location within Chiba Prefecture

Sōgosandō Station (宗吾参道駅, Sōgosandō-eki) is a railway station on the Keisei Main Line in the town of Shisui, Chiba Japan, operated by the private railway operator Keisei Electric Railway. The main depot of the Keisei Main Line is located directly south of this station.

== Lines ==
Sōgosandō Station is served by the Keisei Main Line, and is 57.0 kilometers from the Tokyo terminus of the Keisei Main Line at Keisei Ueno.

== Station layout ==
Sōgosandō Station has one side platform and one island platform, serving three tracks, connected to an elevated station building.

=== Platforms ===
1-2	Keisei Main Line	for Keisei Tsudanuma, Keisei Takasago, Nippori, and Keisei Ueno
3	Keisei Main Line	for Higashi-Narita, Keisei Narita, and Narita Airport (Terminal 2·3 and Terminal 1)

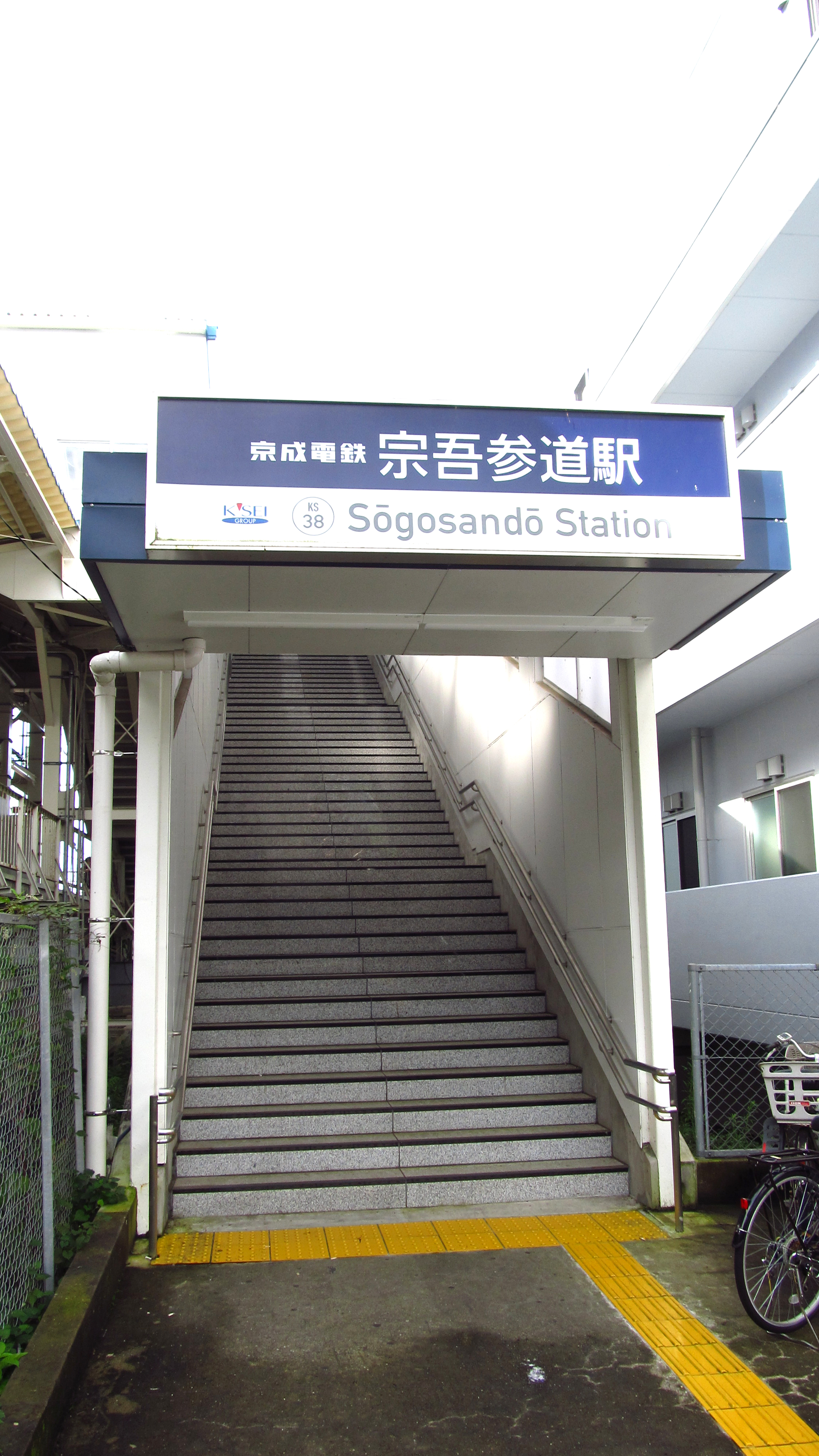
The west-side entrance

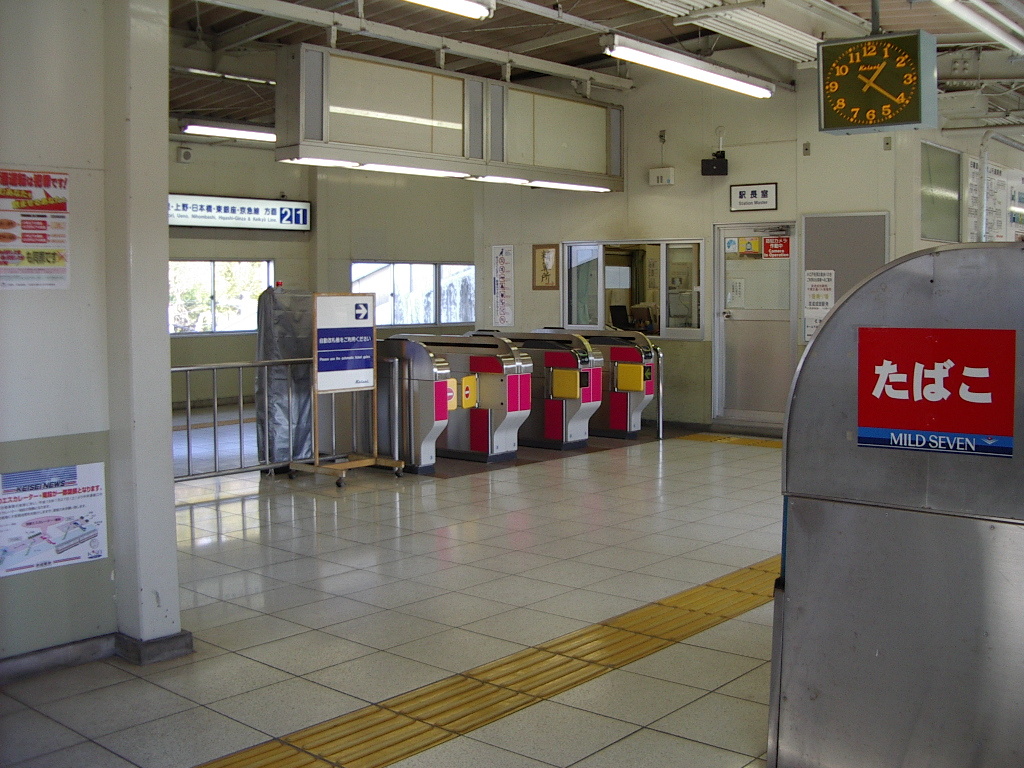
The ticket barriers

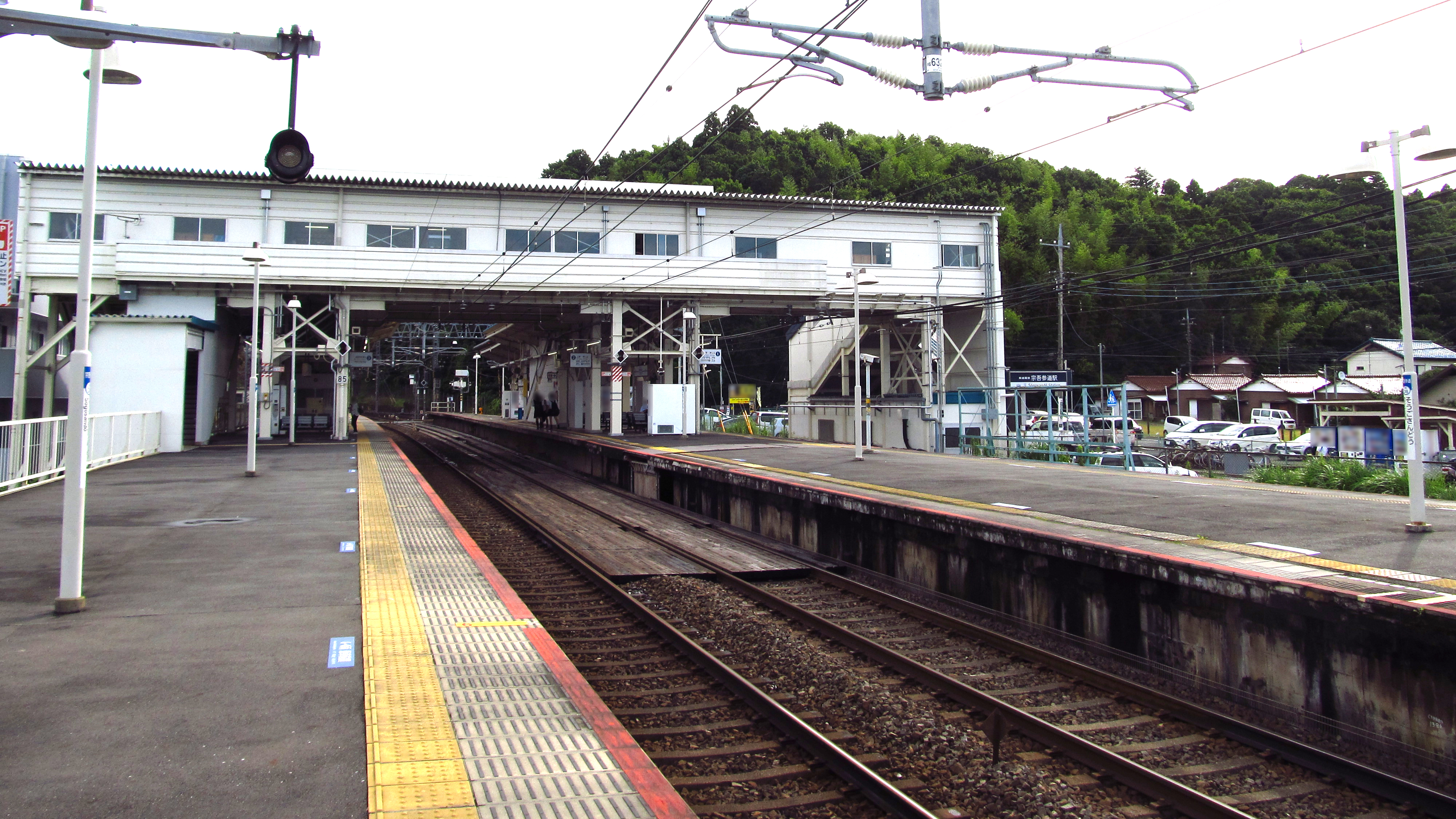
The platforms

== History ==
The station opened on 1 April 11928, as Sōgo Station (宗吾駅). It was renamed Sōgosandō on July 1, 1951.

Station numbering was introduced to all Keisei Line stations on 17 July 2010; Sōgosandō Station was assigned station number KS38.

== Passenger statistics ==
In fiscal 2019, the station was used by an average of 2757 passengers daily.

== Surrounding area ==
- Tokyo Gakkan High School (Kamagata Gakuen)
- Keisei Electric Railway Training Center
- Sōgo railyards

== See also ==
- List of railway stations in Japan
