= Kaijin Station =

Railway station in Funabashi, Chiba Prefecture, Japan

KS21 Kaijin Station 海神駅
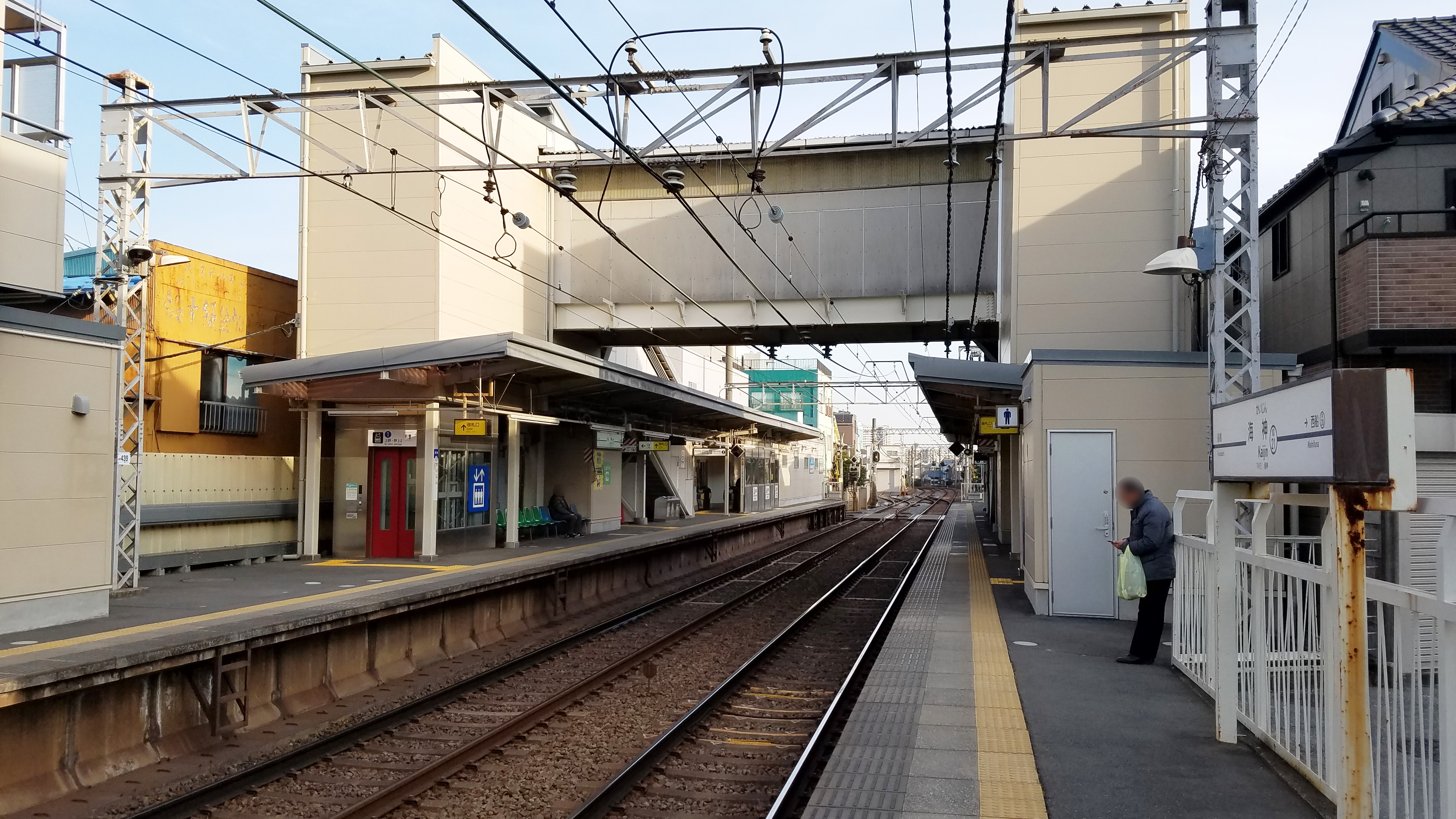
- A view of the platforms in February 2018

General information
- Location: 5-1-22 Kaijin, Funabashi-shi, Chiba-ken 273-0021; Japan
- Coordinates: 35.7058°N 139.9719°E
- Operator: Keisei Electric Railway
- Line: Keisei Main Line
- Distance: 23.6 km from Keisei Ueno
- Platforms: 2 island platforms

Other information
- Station code: KS21
- Website: Official website

History
- Opened: October 25, 1919

Passengers
- FY2019: 5715 daily

Services
Preceding station	Keisei	Following station
Keisei Nishifuna KS20 towards Keisei Ueno	Main Line Local	Keisei Funabashi KS22 towards Narita Airport Terminal 1
Location
- Location within Chiba Prefecture Location within Japan

Kaijin Station (海神駅, Kaijin-eki) is a passenger railway station in the city of Funabashi, Chiba Prefecture, Japan, operated by the private railway operator Keisei Electric Railway.

== Lines ==
Kaijin Station is served by the Keisei Main Line, and is located 23.6 km from the terminus of the line at Keisei Ueno Station.

== Station layout ==
Kaijin Station has two opposed side platforms connected via a footbridge to a station building. The platforms are short, and can only accommodate trains with a length of six carriages or less.

=== Platforms ===
1	Keisei Main Line	for Keisei Takasago, Nippori, and Keisei Ueno
2	Keisei Main Line	for Keisei Funabashi, Keisei Tsudanuma, Keisei Chiba, Chiharadai, Keisei Narita, and Narita Airport (Terminal 2·3 and Terminal 1)

== History ==
Kaijin Station was opened on 25 October 1919. In December 1929 the Sobu Railway Noda Line (currently Tōbu Noda Line) connected to Kaijin Station, but operations were discontinued in 1934.

Station numbering was introduced to all Keisei Line stations on 17 July 2010. Kaijin was assigned station number KS21.

The overhead walkway at this station completed renewal works on 4 April 2023.

== Passenger statistics ==
In fiscal 2019, the station was used by an average of 5715 passengers daily.

== Surrounding area ==
- Hinodai Shell Midden Museum
- Funabashi City Kaijin Junior High School
- Funabashi City Nishikaijin Elementary School

== See also ==
- List of railway stations in Japan
