= Moto Sakura Castle =

Castle ruins in Inba District, Japan

- 本佐倉城
- Sakura / Shisui, Chiba Prefecture, Japan
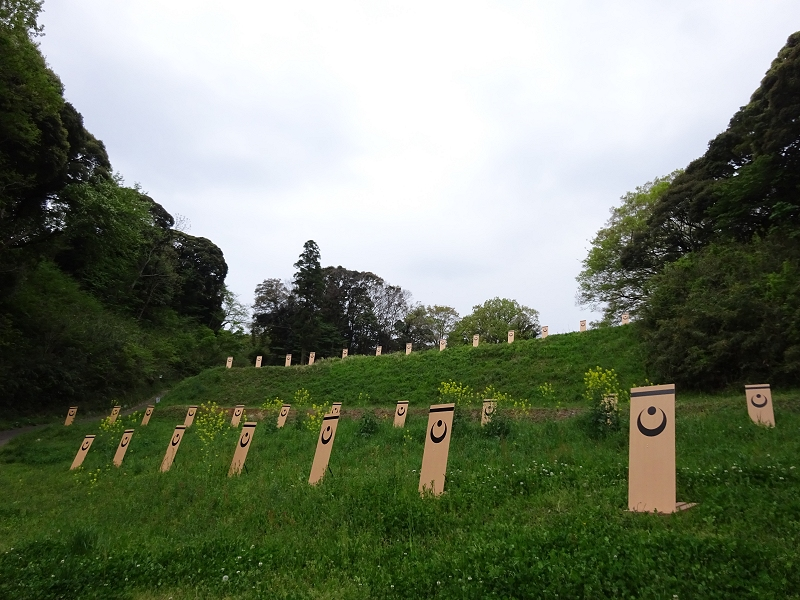
- Earthwork of Moto Sakura Castle

Site information
- Type: Hirayama-style castle
- Owner: Chiba clan, Later Hōjō clan
- Condition: ruins

Location
- Motosakura Castle Moto Sakura Castle (Japan)
- Coordinates: 35°43′39.13″N 140°15′32.43″E

Site history
- Built: 1469 to 1489
- Built by: Chiba clan
- Demolished: 1615

Garrison information
- Past commanders: Matsudaira Tadateru, Doi Toshikatsu

Moto Sakura Castle (本佐倉城, Motosakura-jō) was a Muromachi period "hirayama"-style castle located on the border of the town of Shisui and the city of Sakura, Chiba Prefecture, Japan. Its ruins been protected as a National Historic Site since 1998.

== Overview ==
Motosakura Castle was located on a long and narrow hill with an elevation of 30 meters, some two kilometers to the east of the Edo period Sakura Castle. When it was built in the Muromachi period, the castle was on the shore of the Gulf of Kashima, which extended into present-day Lake Kasumigaura, Lake Teganuma and Lake Inbanuma, and which formed the border between Shimōsa Province and Hitachi Province. The road between the political capital of Kamakura and the city of Chōshi on the Pacific coast and the mouth of the Tone River also passed through this location. The castle was approximately 800 meters in length by 700 meters in width and was roughly L-shaped, utilizing the surrounding marshlands on three sides as a major component of its defenses.

== History ==
This area was the home territory of the Chiba clan, one of the eight most powerful samurai clans in the Kantō region during the late Heian period. Chiba Tsunetane was an early supporter of Minamoto no Yoritomo and under the Kamakura shogunate was awarded most of Shimōsa and Kazusa Provinces. However, after the fall of the Kamakura shogunate, the clan fragmented due to internal conflicts and lost most of its power and influence. By the middle of the 15th century, they had been reduced to vassals of their former retainers, the Hara clan.

Makuwari Yasutane attacked Chiba castle, defeating the Chiba clan in 1455. He took the Chiba name, and the family continued to rule in the area, with Motosakura Castle was built by Chiba Suketane in 1469 under these reduced circumstances, and was gradually enlarged by his successors. However, they were only a small player surrounded by powerful and aggressive neighbors, such as the Satake clan from Hitachi and the Satomi clan from Awa Province at the southern end of the Bōsō Peninsula, as well as the fluctuating authority of the Ashikaga clan who still nominally ruled eastern Japan via the Kantō kubō. The Chiba clan survived through an alliance with the Odawara-based Hōjō clan. With Hōjō support, Chiba Tanetomi (1527-1579) repeatedly defeated attacked by Uesugi Kenshin and by the Satomi clan. However, in the Sengoku period and after the death of Chiba Tanetomi, the clan was again weakened, and became direct vassals of the Hōjō. The Hōjō made efforts to strengthen the castle's defenses by increasing the size of its earthen ramparts and adding dry moats. With the defeat of the Hōjō at the hands of Toyotomi Hideyoshi in 1590 after the Battle of Odawara, the Chiba clan was also extinguished. The Kantō region was awarded by Hideyoshi to Tokugawa Ieyasu, who demolished most of the defenses of Motosakura Castle and established a jin'ya, which was originally awarded to his fifth son, Takeda Nobuyoshi. Later, Doi Toshikatsu resided at this castle as daimyō of Sakura Domain while Sakura Castle was being constructed. Under the Tokugawa shogunate's policy of "one castle per domain", the headquarters of Sakura Domain became Sakura Castle, and Motosakura Castle was abandoned in 1615. The castle town of Sakura survived the loss of its castle as a post station on the Narita Kaidō highway.

== Current ==
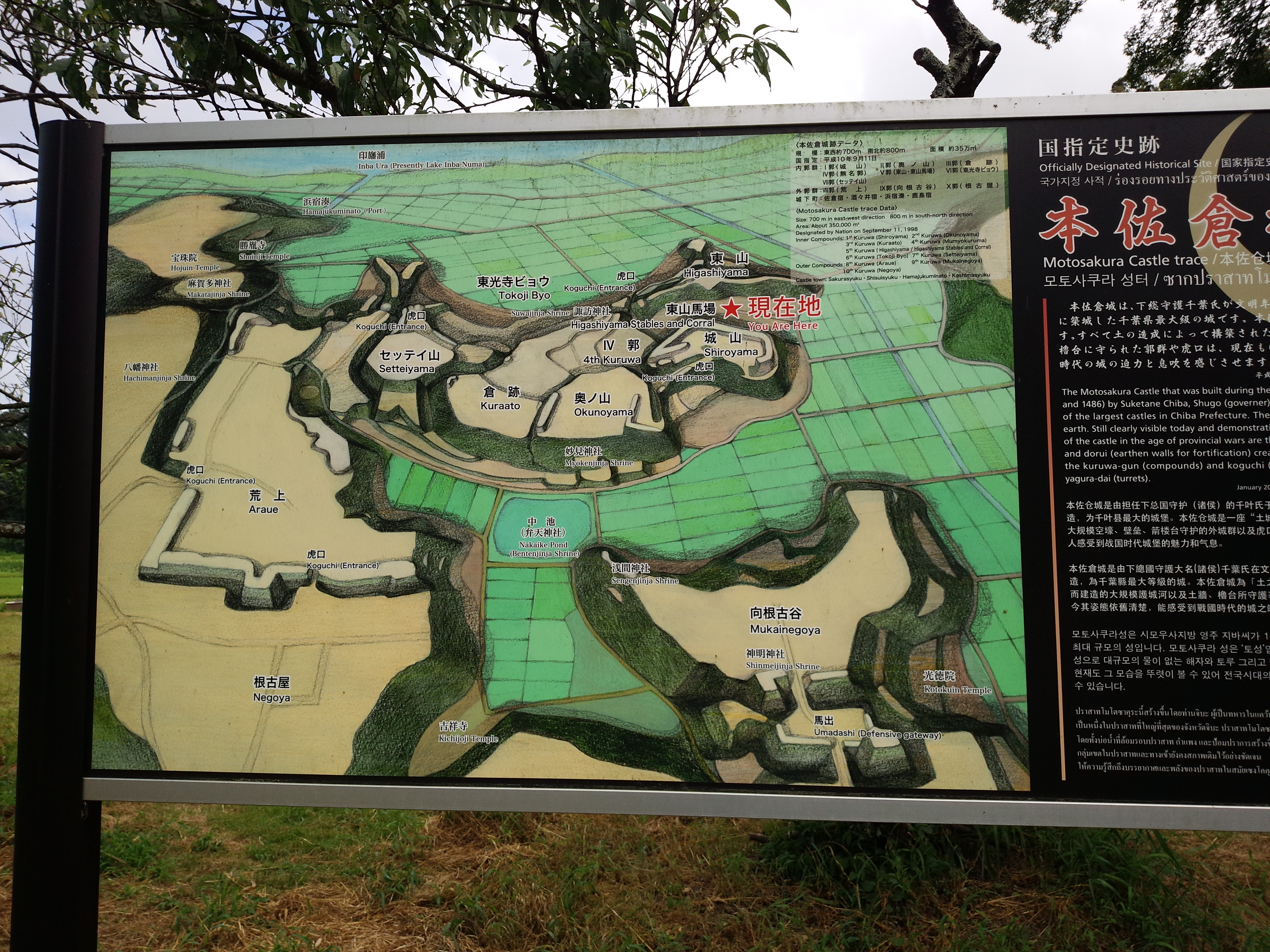
Map of Motosakura Castle

At present, the shape of central areas and portions of earthen walls survive and are maintained as a historical park. The site is approximately 15 minutes on foot from Ōsakura Station on the Keisei Main Line.

The castle is now only ruins, with some moats and earthworks. In 2017, the castle was listed as one of the Continued Top 100 Japanese Castles.

== Gallery ==
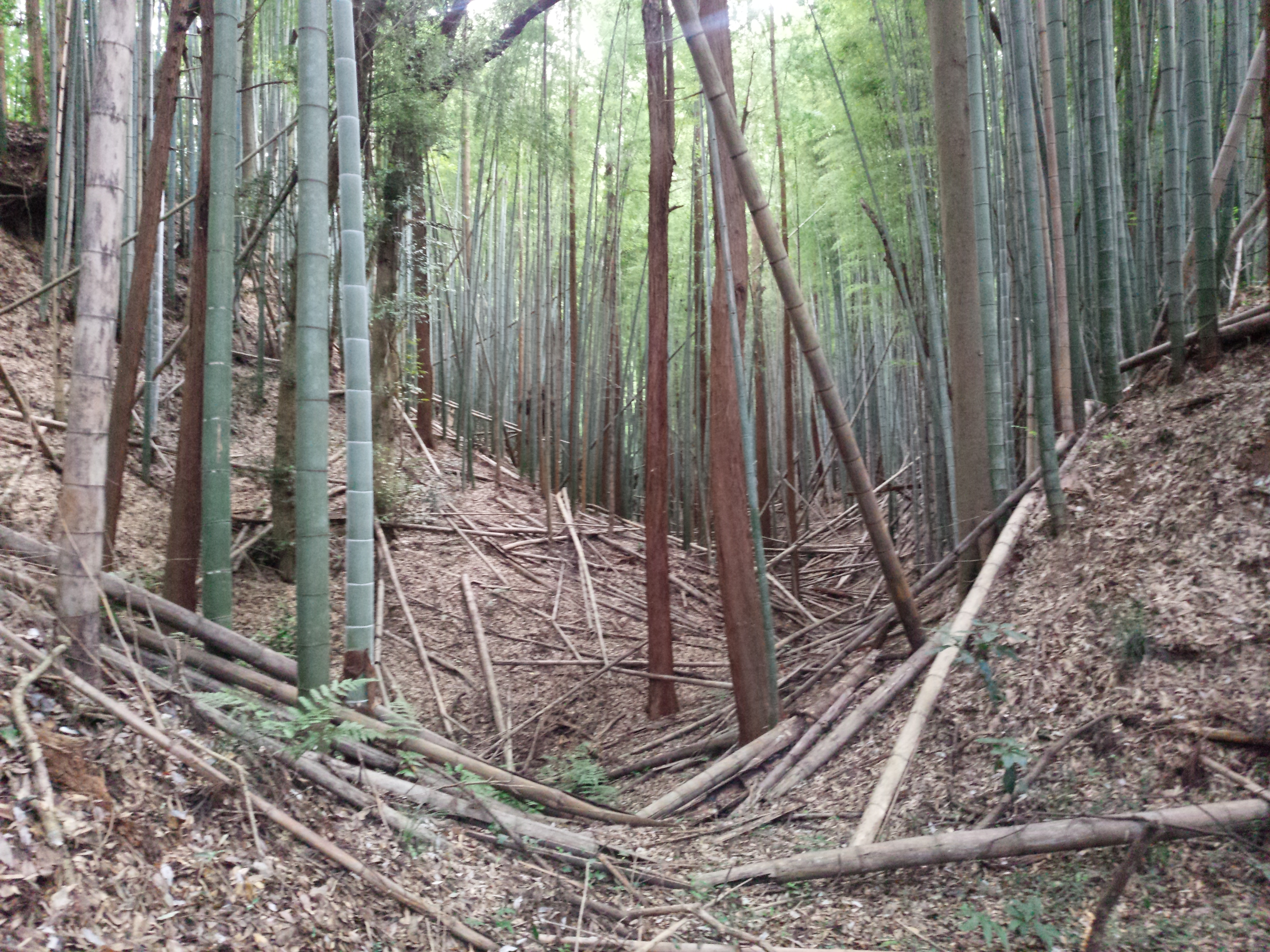
Moat of Settei Compound

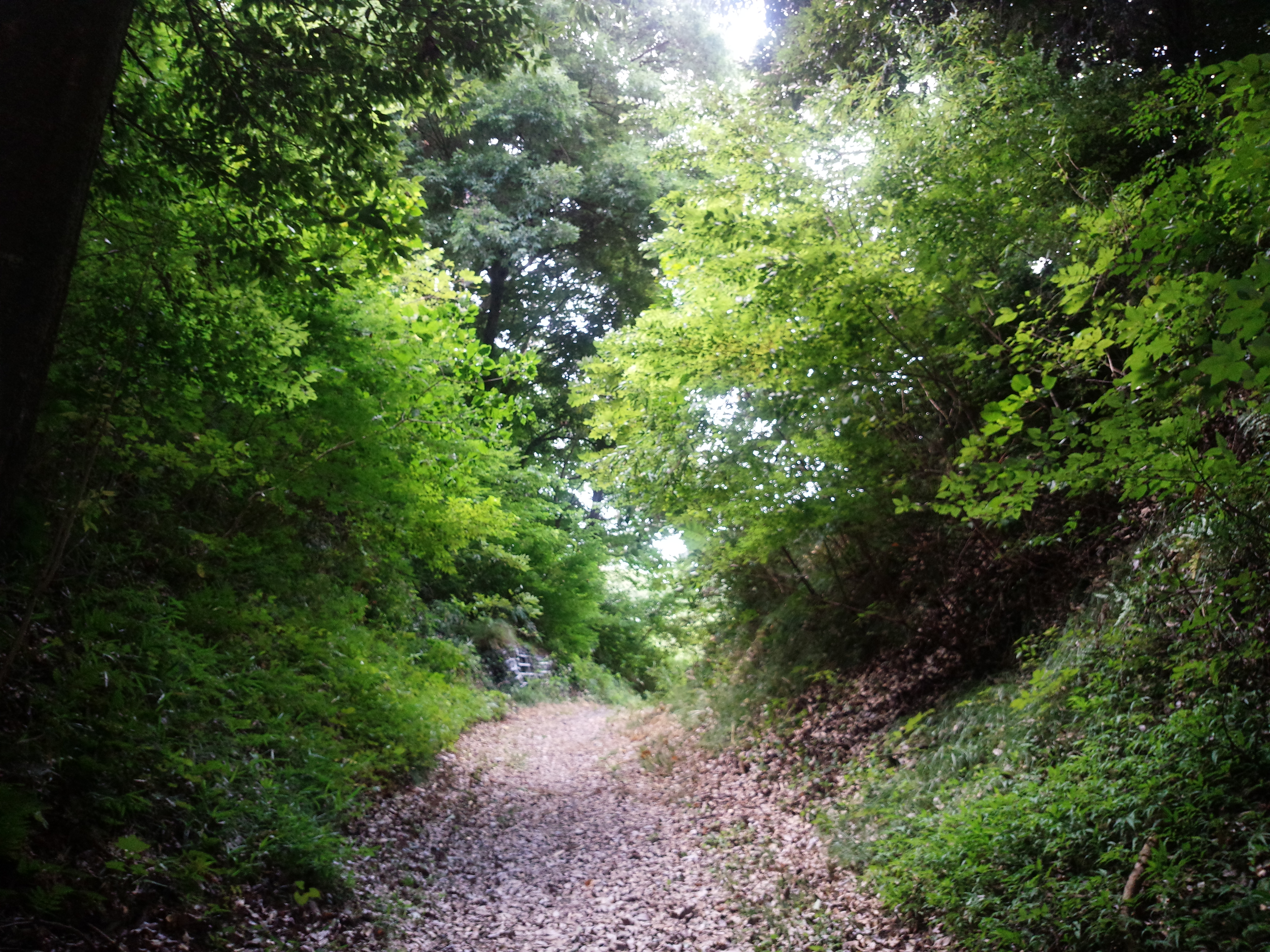
Moat between Shiroyama compound and Okunoyama compound

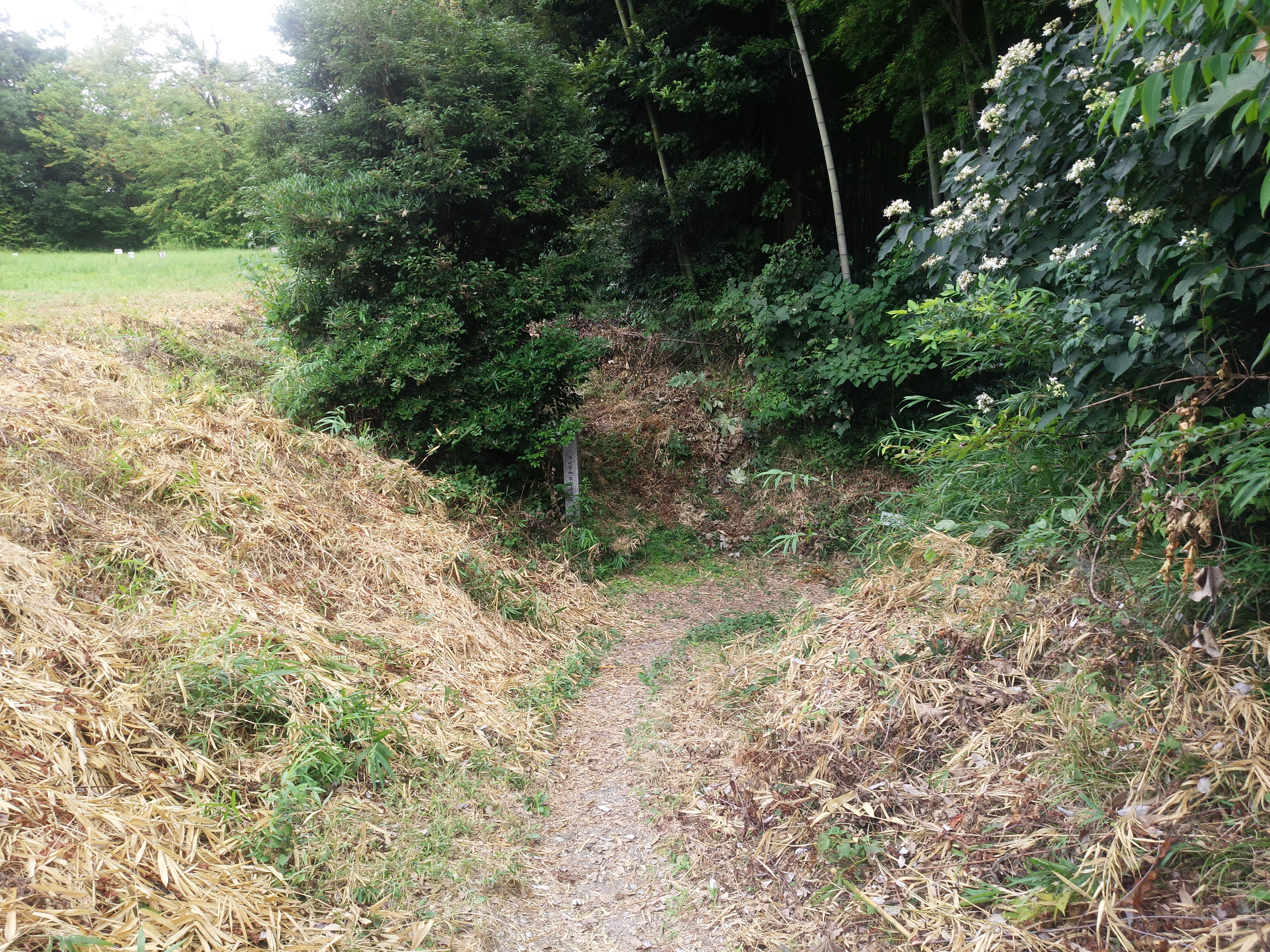
Masaugata gate of Shiroyama Compound

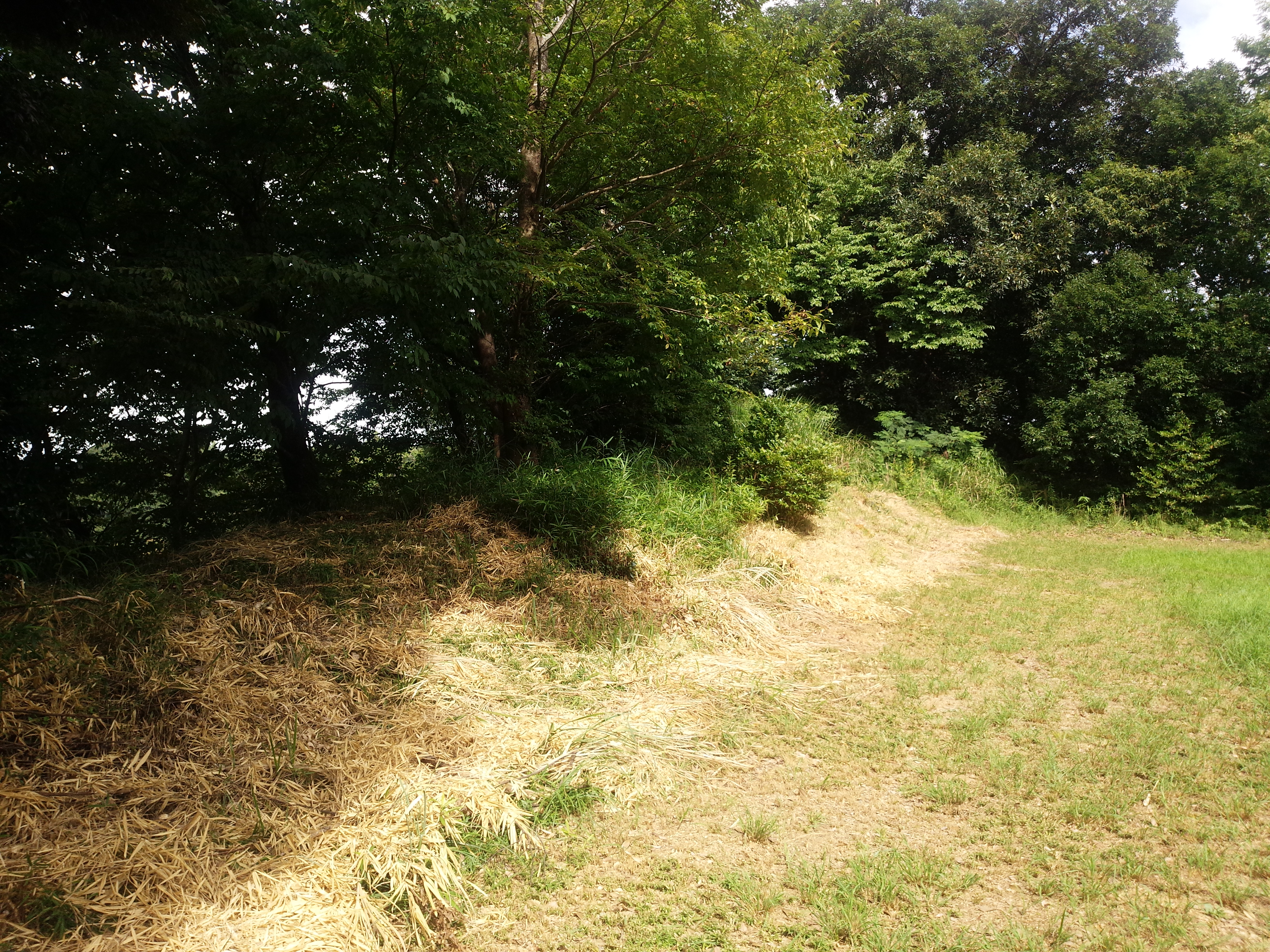
Earthen wall of Shiroyama Compound

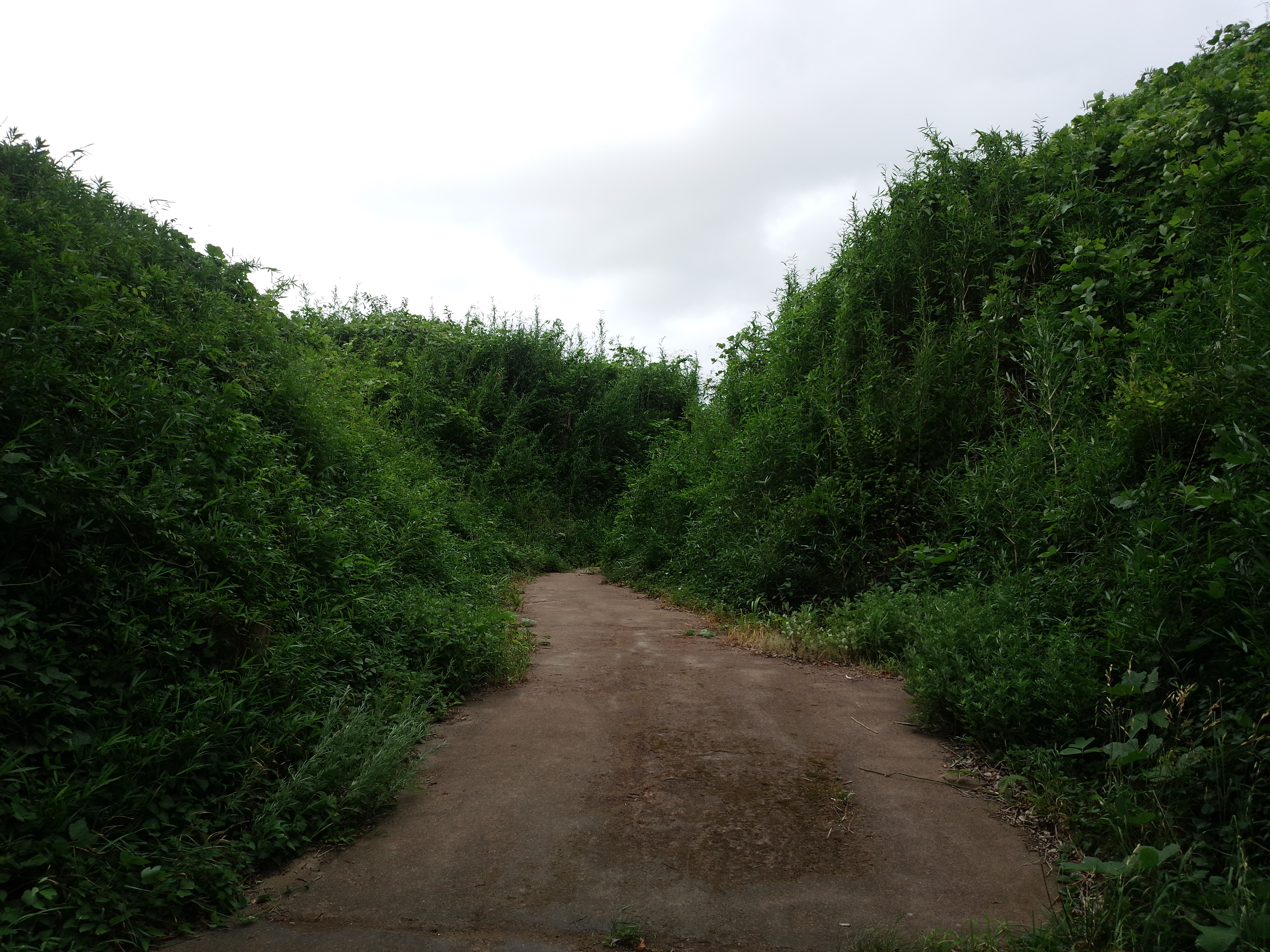
Higashiyama gate of Motosakura Castle

== See also ==
- List of Historic Sites of Japan (Chiba)

== Literature ==
- Schmorleitz, Morton S. (1974). Castles in Japan. Tokyo: Charles E. Tuttle Co. pp. 144–145. ISBN 0-8048-1102-4.
- Motoo, Hinago (1986). Japanese Castles. Tokyo: Kodansha. p. 200 pages. ISBN 0-87011-766-1.
- Mitchelhill, Jennifer (2004). Castles of the Samurai: Power and Beauty. Tokyo: Kodansha. p. 112 pages. ISBN 4-7700-2954-3.
- Turnbull, Stephen (2003). Japanese Castles 1540-1640. Osprey Publishing. p. 64 pages. ISBN 1-84176-429-9.
