= Kōzunomori Station =

Railway station in Narita, Chiba Prefecture, Japan

KS39 Kōzunomori Station 公津の杜駅
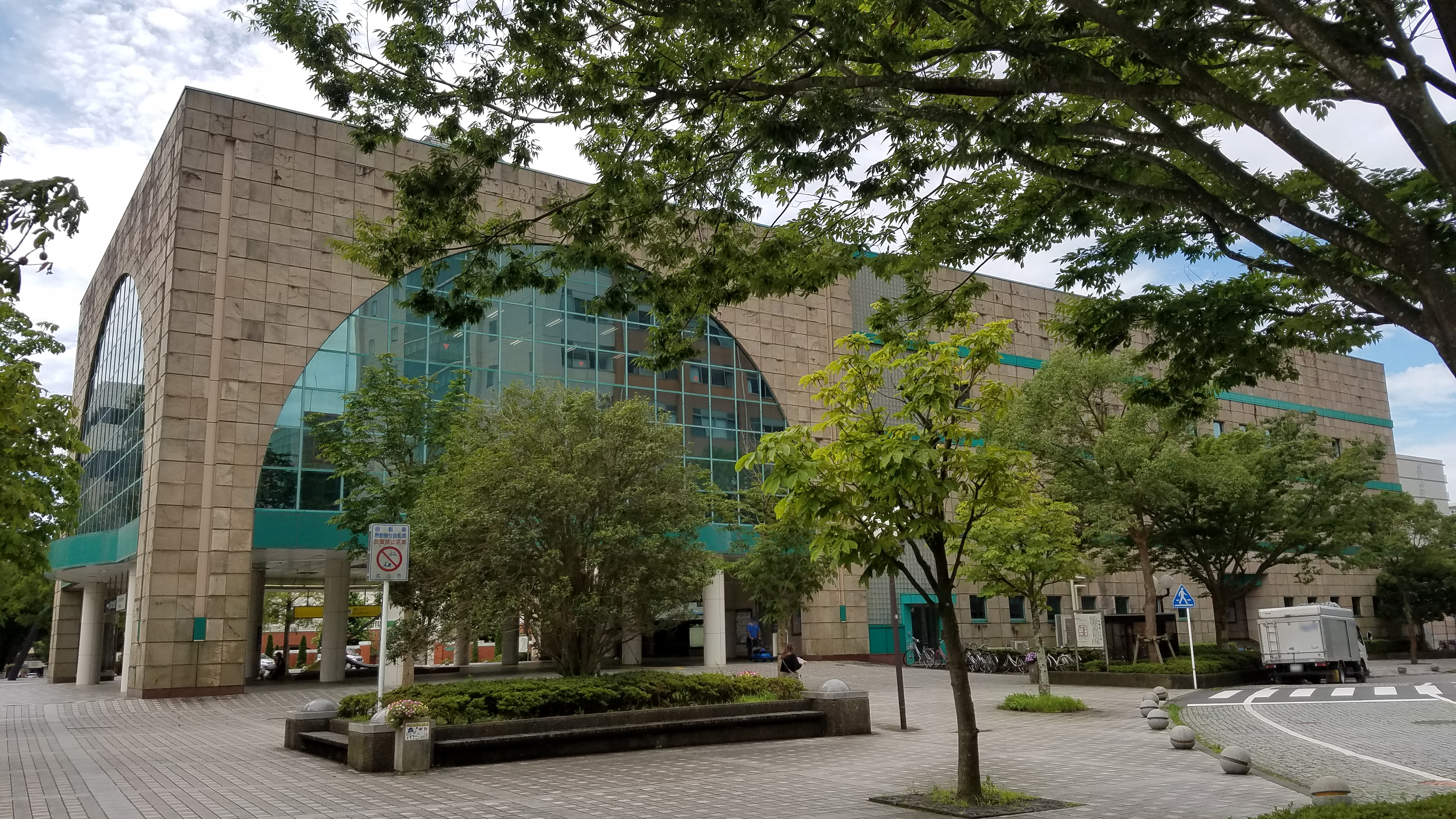
- Kōzunomori Station in March 2012

General information
- Location: 4-11-2 Kōzunomori, Narita-shi, Chiba-ken 286-0048; Japan
- Coordinates: 35.7604781°N 140.2951634°E
- Operator: Keisei Electric Railway
- Line: Keisei Main Line
- Platforms: 2 side platforms

Other information
- Station code: KS39
- Website: Official website

History
- Opened: April 1, 1994

Passengers
- FY2019: 14,034 daily

Services
Preceding station	Keisei	Following station
Sōgosandō KS38 towards Keisei Ueno	Main Line Limited Express Commuter Express Rapid Local	Keisei Narita KS40 towards Narita Airport Terminal 1
Location
- Location within Chiba Prefecture Location within Japan

Kōzunomori Station (公津の杜駅, Kōzunomori-eki) is a passenger railway station located in the city of Narita, Chiba Prefecture, Japan, operated by the private railway company Keisei Electric Railway.

== Lines ==
Kōzunomori Station is served by the Keisei Main Line. It lies 58.6 km from the Tokyo terminus of the Keisei Main Line at Keisei Ueno Station. It is the first station after Keisei Narita on the way towards Nippori, Ueno and Tokyo. However, Morningliner, Eveningliner and Limited Express (Green) trains do not stop here.

== Station layout ==
Kōzunomori Station has two opposed side platforms connected to an elevated station building.

=== Platforms ===
1	Keisei Main Line	for Keisei Tsudanuma and Keisei Ueno; Keisei Oshiage Line for Oshiage; Toei Asakusa Line for Nihombashi and Sengakuji; Keikyu Main Line for Shinagawa and Haneda Airport (International Terminal and Domestic Terminal)
2	Keisei Main Line	for Keisei Narita and Narita Airport (Terminal 2·3 and Terminal 1)

== History ==
Kōzunomori Station was opened on 1 April 1994.

Station numbering was introduced to all Keisei Line stations on 17 July 2010; Kōzunomori Station was assigned station number KS39.

== Passenger statistics ==
In fiscal 2019, the station was used by an average of 14,034 passengers daily (boarding passengers only).

== Surrounding area ==
- Kozunomori Community Center (Morinpia)
- Narita Wholesale Market
- Narita Aviation Business College
- Narita City Kozunomori Junior High School
- Narita City Kozunomori Elementary School

== See also ==
- List of railway stations in Japan
