= Keisei Shisui Station =

Railway station in Shisui, Chiba Prefecture, Japan

KS37 Keisei Shisui Station 京成酒々井駅
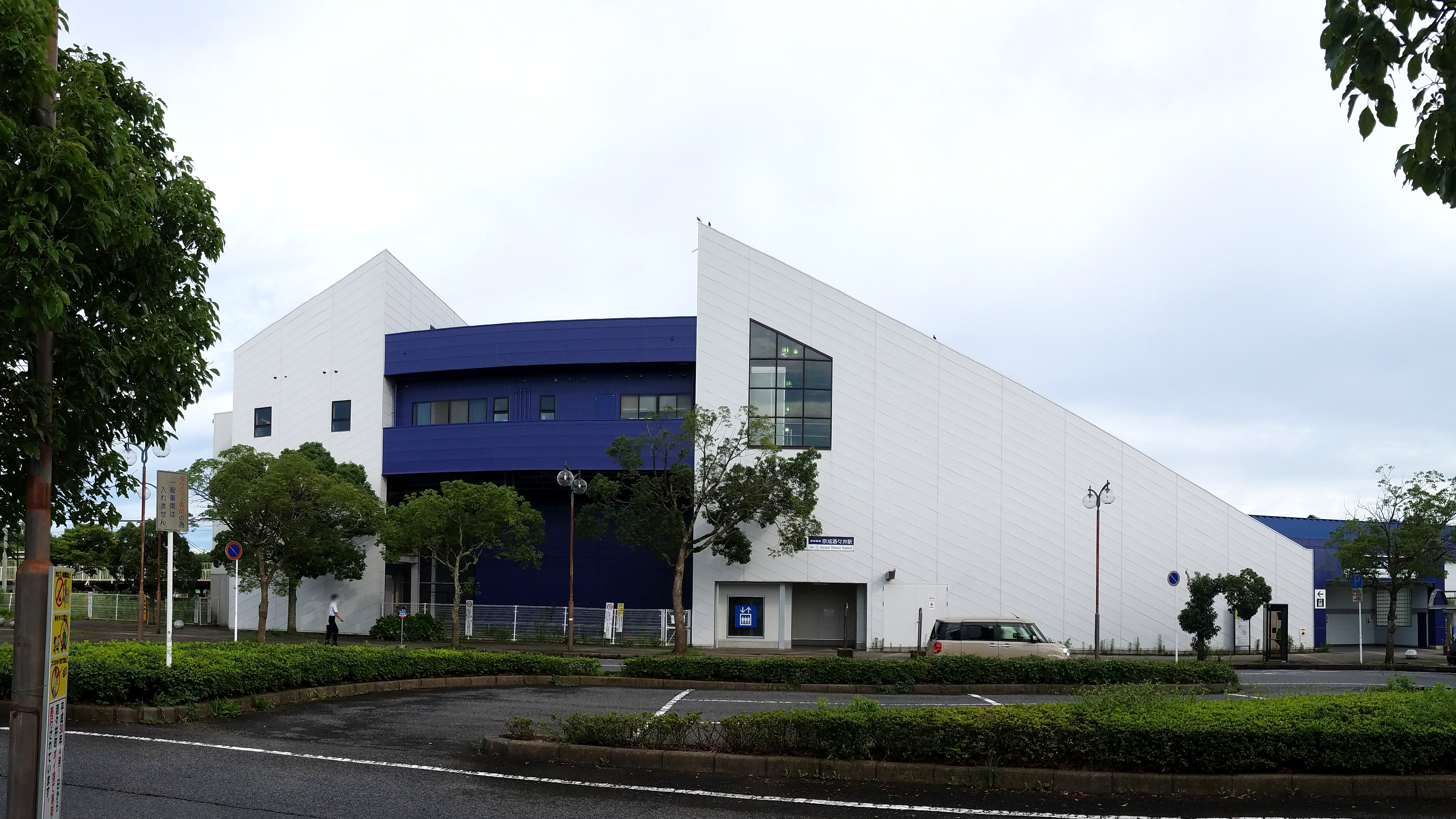
- The east-side building of the station in July 2020

General information
- Location: 560-1 Nakagawa, Shisui-machi, Inba-gun, Chiba-ken 285-0921; Japan
- Coordinates: 35.7367°N 140.2701°E
- Operator: Keisei Electric Railway
- Line: Keisei Main Line
- Distance: 55.0 km from Keisei-Ueno
- Platforms: 2 side platforms

Other information
- Station code: KS37
- Website: Official website

History
- Opened: December 9, 1926

Passengers
- 2019: 6713 daily

Services
Preceding station	Keisei	Following station
Ōsakura KS36 towards Keisei Ueno	Main Line Limited Express Commuter Express Rapid Local	Sōgosandō KS38 towards Narita Airport Terminal 1
Location
- Location within Chiba Prefecture

Keisei Shisui Station (京成酒々井駅, Keisei-Shisui-eki) is a railway station on the Keisei Main Line in the town of Shisui, Chiba Japan, operated by the private railway operator Keisei Electric Railway.

== Lines ==
Keisei-Shisui Station is served by the Keisei Main Line, and is 55.0 kilometers from the Tokyo terminus of the Keisei Main Line at Keisei-Ueno Station.

== Station layout ==
The station consists of two opposed side platforms connected to an elevated station building.

=== Platforms ===
1	Keisei Main Line	for Keisei Tsudanuma, Keisei Funabashi, Aoto, Nippori, and Keisei Ueno
2	Keisei Main Line	for Keisei Narita and Narita Airport (Terminal 2·3 and Terminal 1)

== History ==
Keisei Shisui Station was opened on 9 December 1926.

Station numbering was introduced to all Keisei Line stations on 17 July 2010; Keisei-Shisui Station was assigned station number KS37.

== Passenger statistics ==
In fiscal 2019, the station was used by an average of 6713 passengers daily.

== Surrounding area ==
- Shisui Town Hall
- Shisui Municipal Library
- Tokyo Gakkan High School

== See also ==
- List of railway stations in Japan
