= Keisei-Nishifuna Station =

Railway station in Funabashi, Chiba Prefecture, Japan

KS20 Keisei-Nishifuna Station 京成西船駅
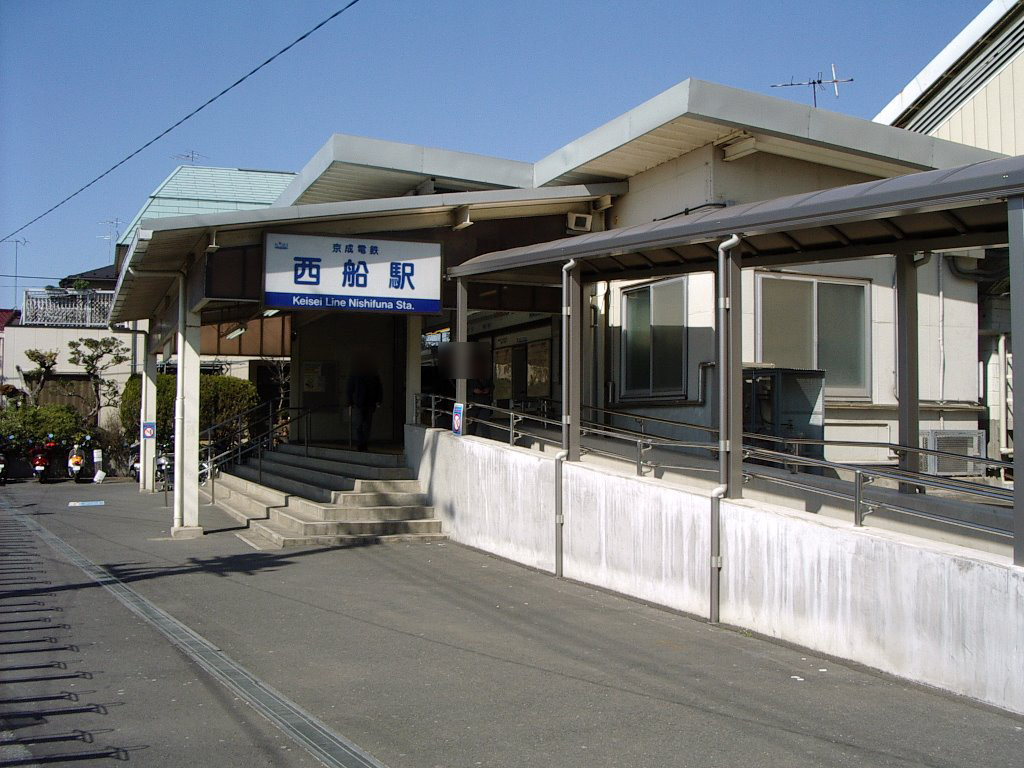
- Keisei-Nishifuna Station in February 2007

General information
- Location: 4-15-27 Nishifuna, Funabashi-shi, Chiba-ken 273-0031; Japan
- Coordinates: 35.7118°N 139.9589°E
- Operator: Keisei Electric Railway
- Line: Keisei Main Line
- Distance: 22.2 km from Keisei Ueno
- Platforms: 2 side platforms

Other information
- Station code: KS20
- Website: Official website

History
- Opened: December 30, 1916
- Former names: Katsushika (until 1985)

Passengers
- FY2019: 10,934 daily

Services
Preceding station	Keisei	Following station
Higashi-Nakayama KS19 towards Keisei Ueno	Main Line Local	Kaijin KS21 towards Narita Airport Terminal 1
Location
- Location within Chiba Prefecture Location within Japan

Keisei-Nishifuna Station (京成西船駅, Keisei-Nishifuna-eki) is a passenger railway station in the city of Funabashi, Chiba Prefecture, Japan, operated by the private railway operator Keisei Electric Railway.

== Lines ==
Keisei-Nishifuna Station is served by the Keisei Main Line, and is located 22.2 km from the terminus of the line at Keisei Ueno Station.

== Station layout ==
The station has two opposed side platforms connected via a footbridge to a station building.

=== Platforms ===
1	Keisei Main Line	for Keisei Takasago, Nippori, and Keisei Ueno
2	Keisei Main Line	for Keisei Funabashi, Keisei Tsudanuma, Keisei Chiba, Chiharadai, Keisei Narita, and Narita Airport (Terminal 2·3 and Terminal 1)

== History ==
The station opened on 30 December 1916, as Katsushika Station (葛飾駅). It was renamed Keisei-Nishifuna on 1 April 1987.

Station numbering was introduced to all Keisei Line stations on 17 July 2010. Keisei-Nishifuna was assigned station number KS20.

== Passenger statistics ==
In fiscal 2019, the station was used by an average of 10,934 passengers daily.

== Surrounding areas ==
- Nishi-Funabashi Station

It takes about 7 minutes from here to Nishi-Funabashi Station on foot or about 3 minutes by riding on route buses below.

== Buses ==
- Keisei-Nishifuna bus stop which is bound for suburb is located due south of the station. It takes about 2 minutes on foot.
- Keisei-Nishifuna bus stop which is bound for Nishi-Funabashi Station is located due north of the station. It takes about 1 minutes on foot.

Bus routes
Bus stop	No	Via	Destination	Company	Note
Station South	Fs01	Gyoda Danchi·Mae Kaiduka·Kirihata	Fighters Kamagaya Stadium	Keisei Bus	
Station South	Fs02	Gyoda Danchi·Mae Kaiduka·Kirihata	Ichikawa Office	Keisei Bus	There is midnight bus on weekdays
Station South	Fs03	Gyoda Danchi·Mae Kaiduka	Kirihata	Keisei Bus	
Station South	Fs04		Gyoda Danchi	Keisei Bus	
Station South	Fs05	Gyoda Danchi	Mae Kaiduka	Keisei Bus	
Station North	Fs01	Non stop	Nishi-Funabashi Station	Keisei Bus	
Station North	Fs02	Non stop	Nishi-Funabashi Station	Keisei Bus	
Station North	Fs03	Non stop	Nishi-Funabashi Station	Keisei Bus	
Station North	Fs04	Non stop	Nishi-Funabashi Station	Keisei Bus	
Station North	Fs05	Non stop	Nishi-Funabashi Station	Keisei Bus	

== See also ==
- List of railway stations in Japan
