= Hakubutsukan-Dōbutsuen Station =

Abandoned railway station in Ueno, Tokyo

Hakubutsukan-Dōbutsuen Station 博物館動物園駅
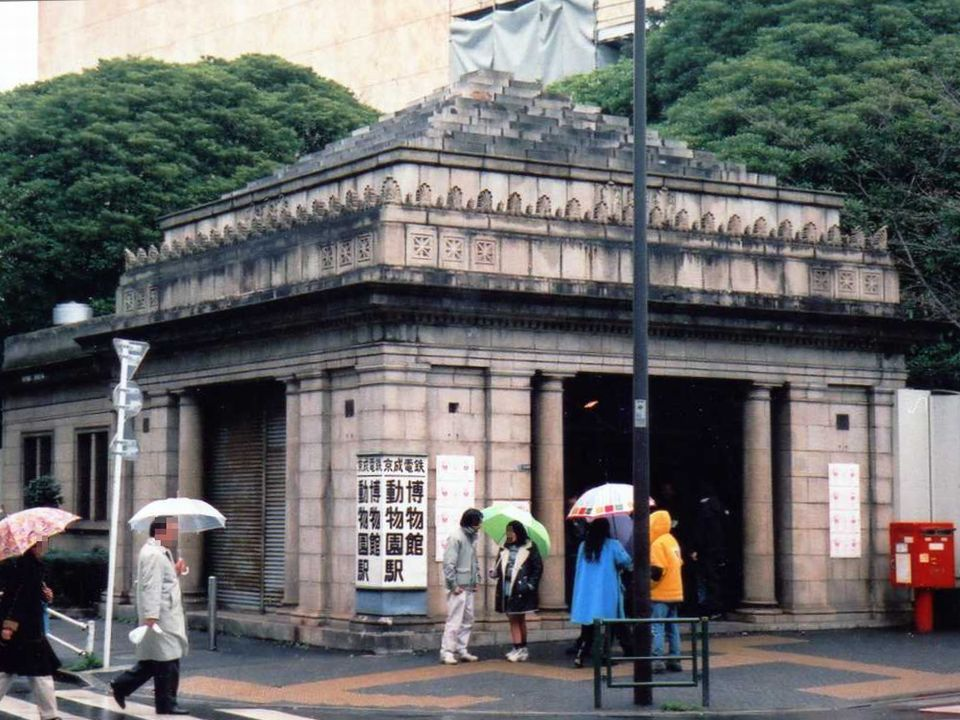
- Hakubutsukan-Dōbutsuen in March 1997

General information
- Location: 13-23 Ueno-kōen, Taitō-ku, Tokyo; Japan
- Coordinates: 35°43′7.1″N 139°46′24.5″E
- Operator: Keisei Electric Railway
- Line: Keisei Main Line
- Platforms: 2
- Tracks: 2

Construction
- Structure type: Underground

History
- Opened: December 10, 1933
- Closed: April 1, 1997

Passengers
- FY1996: 249 daily

Former services
Preceding station	Keisei	Following station
Keisei Ueno Terminus	Main Line Local	Nippori towards Narita Airport Terminal 1
Location
- Location within Tokyo

Hakubutsukan-Dobutsuen Station (Japanese: 博物館動物園駅) is a former station of the Keisei Electric Railway in Taito-ku, Tokyo. It is located between Nippori Station and Keisei Ueno Station. It opened in 1933, but was closed on 1 April 1997 due to the length of the platform being too short for most trains. The station was formally abandoned in April 2004. The station building and platform are still in existence and have been renovated and opened to the public in 2018.

== History ==
Before the modern-day Keisei Ueno Station even existed, at the beginning of the Showa era, rail designers had planned to build a tiny station halfway between Nippori and Ueno Park stations. Hakubutsukan-Dōbutsuen Station opened to the public in 1933. Ueno was second only to Asakusa in terms of prestige among Tokyo's shopping and entertainment districts at the time. Many had hoped for a new way into the neighborhood, and the new rail station made that a reality. However, this particular desire was quite challenging to achieve.

== Gallery ==
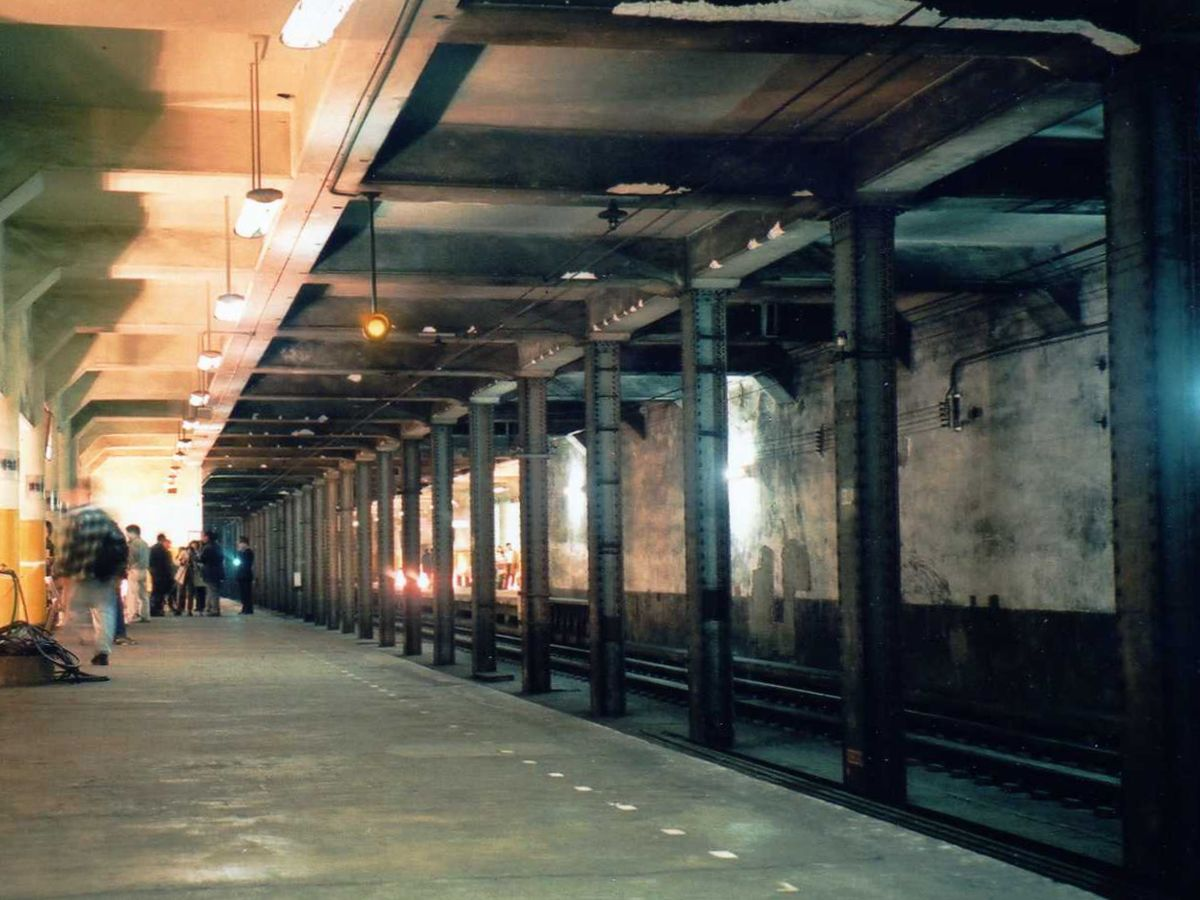
Station platforms, 1997

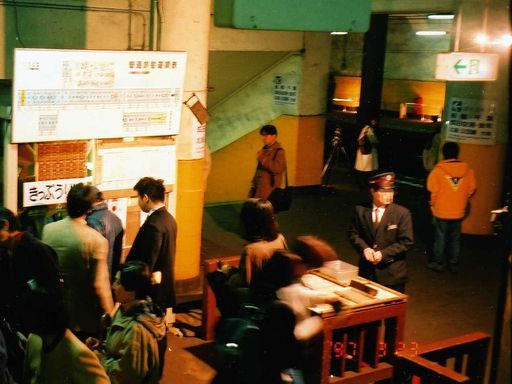
Ticket gate, 1997

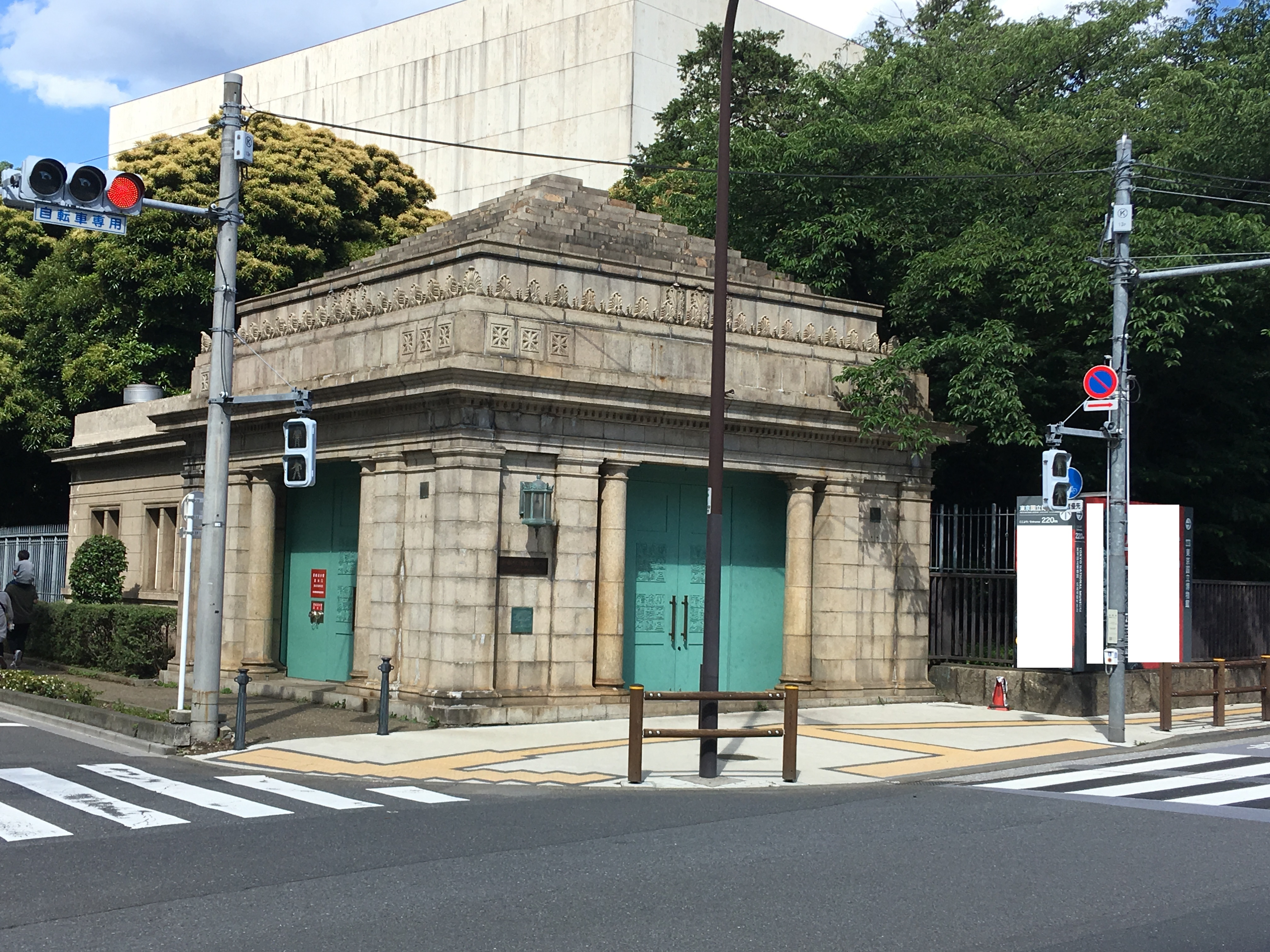
Current view of the station in 2019

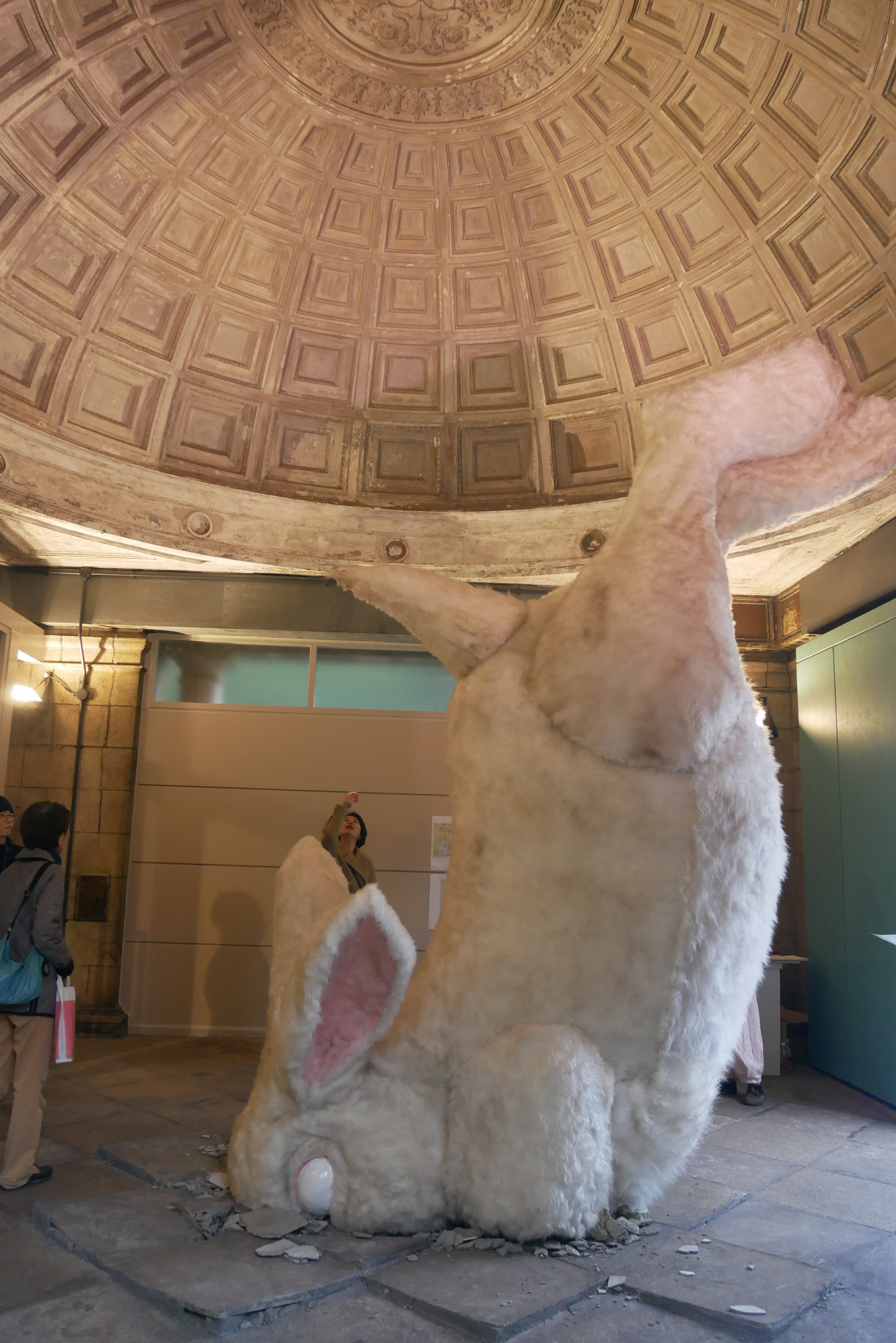
Inside the station during a temporary art show, 2018
