= Katsushika (disambiguation) =

The Japanese name Katsushika (葛飾) may refer to:

== Places ==
- Katsushika District, an old district of Shimōsa Province, later Musashi Province.
  - Higashi-Katsushika District, Chiba, a district of Chiba Prefecture.
    - Katsushika, Chiba, a town of Chiba Prefecture, now Funabashi, Chiba.
      - Katsushika Station, now Keisei-Nishifuna Station.
  - Kita-Katsushika District, Saitama, a district of Saitama Prefecture.
  - Naka-Katsushika District, Saitama, an old district of Saitama Prefecture.
  - Nishi-Katsushika District, Ibaraki, an old district of Ibaraki Prefecture.
  - Minami-Katsushika District, Tokyo, an old district of Tokyo Prefecture.
    - Katsushika, Tokyo, a special ward of Tokyo Metropolis.

== Given names ==
- Hokusai, the artist with the family name Katsushika, born Honjo, Katsushika District, Shimōsa Province.
- Katsushika Ōi, his daughter.
