= Ōsakura Station =

Railway station in Sakura, Chiba Prefecture, Japan

KS36 Ōsakura Station 大佐倉駅
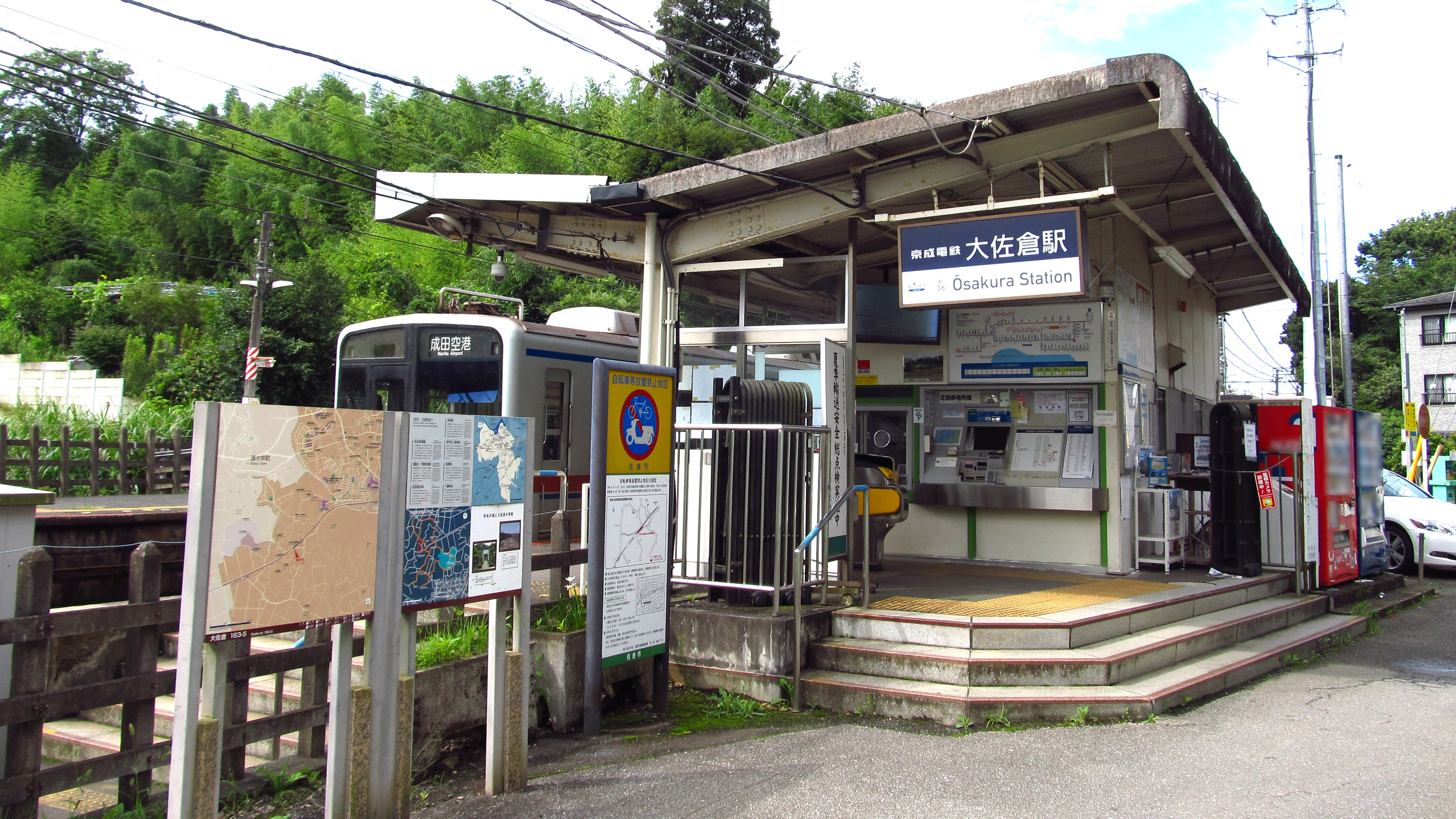
- Entrance to Ōsakura Station in July 2020

General information
- Location: 277 Matsuyama, Ōzakura, Sakura-shi, Chiba-ken; Japan
- Coordinates: 35.7297°N 140.2510°E
- Operator: Keisei Electric Railway
- Line: Keisei Main Line
- Distance: 53.0 km from Keisei-Ueno
- Platforms: 2 side platforms

Other information
- Station code: KS36
- Website: Official website

History
- Opened: December 9, 1926

Passengers
- FY2019: 402 daily

Services
Preceding station	Keisei	Following station
Keisei Sakura KS35 towards Keisei Ueno	Main Line Limited Express Commuter Express Rapid Local	Keisei Shisui KS37 towards Narita Airport Terminal 1
Location
- Location within Chiba Prefecture Location within Japan

Ōsakura Station (大佐倉駅, Ōsakura-eki) is a passenger railway station in the city of Sakura, Chiba Prefecture, Japan, operated by the private railway operator Keisei Electric Railway.

== Lines ==
Ōsakura Station is served by the Keisei Main Line, and lies 53.0 kilometers from the Tokyo terminus of the line at Keisei-Ueno Station.

== Station layout ==
The station consists of two opposed side platforms connected by a level crossing.

=== Platforms ===
1	Keisei Main Line	for Keisei Tsudanuma, Keisei Takasago, Nippori, and Keisei Ueno
2	Keisei Main Line	for Higashi-Narita, Keisei Narita, and Narita Airport (Terminal 2·3 and Terminal 1)

== History ==
Ōsakura Station opened on 9 December 1926.

Station numbering was introduced to all Keisei Line stations on 17 July 2010. Ōsakura Station was assigned station number KS36.

== Passenger statistics ==
In fiscal 2019, the station was used by an average of 402 passengers daily.

== Surrounding area ==
- Sakura City Sakurahigashi Elementary School
- Shisui Municipal Shisui Elementary School

== See also ==
- List of railway stations in Japan
