= Shisui =

Town in Chiba Prefecture, Japan

Shisui 酒々井町
- Town
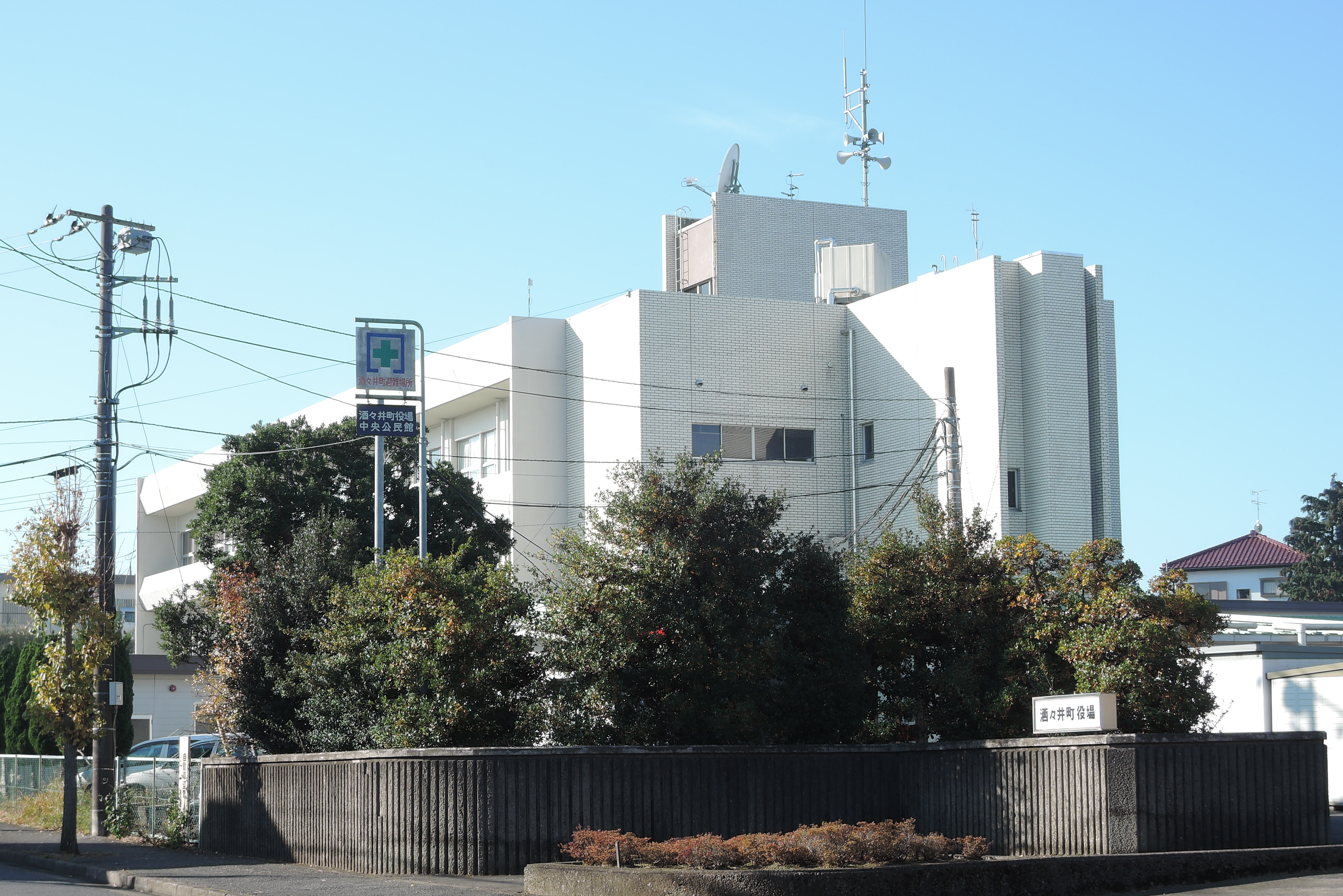
- Shisui Town Hall

- Flag Emblem

- Location of Shisui in Chiba Prefecture

- Coordinates: 35°43′N 140°16′E
- Country: Japan
- Region: Kantō
- Prefecture: Chiba
- District: Inba

Area
  - Total: 19.02 km^{2} (7.34 sq mi)

Population (December 2020)
  - Total: 20,660
  - Density: 1,086/km^{2} (2,813/sq mi)
- Time zone: UTC+9 (Japan Standard Time)
- Symbols
  - Tree: Prunus mume
  - Flower: Narcissus
  - Bird: Japanese white-eye
- Phone number: 043-496-1171
- Address: 4-11 Chuodai Inba-gun, Shisui-machi, Chiba-ken 285-8510
- Website: Official website

Shisui (酒々井町, Shisui-machi) is a town located in Chiba Prefecture, Japan.As of 1 December 2020, the town had an estimated population of 20,660 in 9,888 households and a population density of 1,100 persons per km^{2}. The total area of the town is 19.02 square kilometres (7.34 mi^{2}).

== Etymology ==
The name of Shisui in the Japanese language is formed from three kanji characters. The first, 酒, means "sake", The second, 々, is an ideographic iteration mark, indicating a repetition of the first character, and the third, 井 means "well". The area in present-day Shisui was noted for its freshwater springs, and a local legend arose that pure sake gushed freely from the ground, creating "wells of sake".

== Geography ==
Shisui is located on the Shimōsa Plateau in northeastern Chiba Prefecture, about 20 kilometers from the prefectural capital at Chiba and within 40 to 50 kilometers from the center of Tokyo. The town overlooks the Inba Marsh. The town sits on relatively flat, even ground. The south of Shisui is crossed by three small rivers: the Takazaki, Egawa, and Nakagawa, all of which empty into the Inba Marsh.

=== Neighboring municipalities ===
Chiba Prefecture

- Inzai
- Narita
- Sakura
- Tomisato
- Yachimata

=== Climate ===
Shisui has a humid subtropical climate (Köppen Cfa) characterized by warm summers and cool winters with light to no snowfall. The average annual temperature in Shisui is 14.8 °C. The average annual rainfall is 1429 mm with September as the wettest month. The temperatures are highest on average in August, at around 26.3 °C, and lowest in January, at around 4.5 °C.

== Demographics ==
Per Japanese census data, the population of Shisui increased rapidly in the 1970s and 1980s, but has remained steady over the past 30 years.

Historical population
Year	Pop.	±%
1920	4,338	—
1930	4,507	+3.9%
1940	4,611	+2.3%
1950	6,279	+36.2%
1960	6,093	−3.0%
1970	6,259	+2.7%
1980	12,807	+104.6%
1990	19,298	+50.7%
2000	21,385	+10.8%
2010	21,234	−0.7%
2020	20,745	−2.3%

== History ==
The area around Shisui has been inhabited since at least the Japanese Paleolithic, and archaeologists have found stone tools and the foundations of houses dating 24,000 years ago. During the Muromachi period, the area was under control of the Chiba clan. After the start of the Edo period, much of the area of Shisui was part of Sakura Domain, a feudal domain under the Tokugawa shogunate. After the Meiji Restoration, Shisui Town was founded on April 1, 1889, within Inba District of Chiba Prefecture with the creation of the modern municipalities system. Proposals to merge Shisui with the neighboring city of Sakura failed to pass a public referendum in 2002.

== Government ==
Shisui has a mayor-council form of government with a directly elected mayor and a unicameral town council of 16 members. Together with the city of Sakura, Shisui contributes three members to the Chiba Prefectural Assembly. In terms of national politics, the town is part of Chiba 13th district of the lower house of the Diet of Japan.

== Economy ==
Shisui was historically a center of rice and sake production. The town is located directly south of Narita International Airport. The central part of the town was developed as a regional commercial center beginning in 1975 due to the construction and expansion of the airport.

== Education ==
Shisui has two public elementary schools and one public middle school operated by the town government. The town does not have a public high school, but has one private high school.

== Transportation ==
=== Railway ===
JR East – Narita Line

- Shisui

JR East – Sōbu Main Line

- Minami-Shisui

Keisei Electric Railway – Keisei Main Line

- Keisei Shisui – Sōgosandō

=== Highway ===
- Higashi-Kantō Expressway
- National Route 51
- National Route 296

== Local attractions ==
- Moto Sakura Castle, a National Historic Site
