= Keisei Main Line =

Railway line in Japan

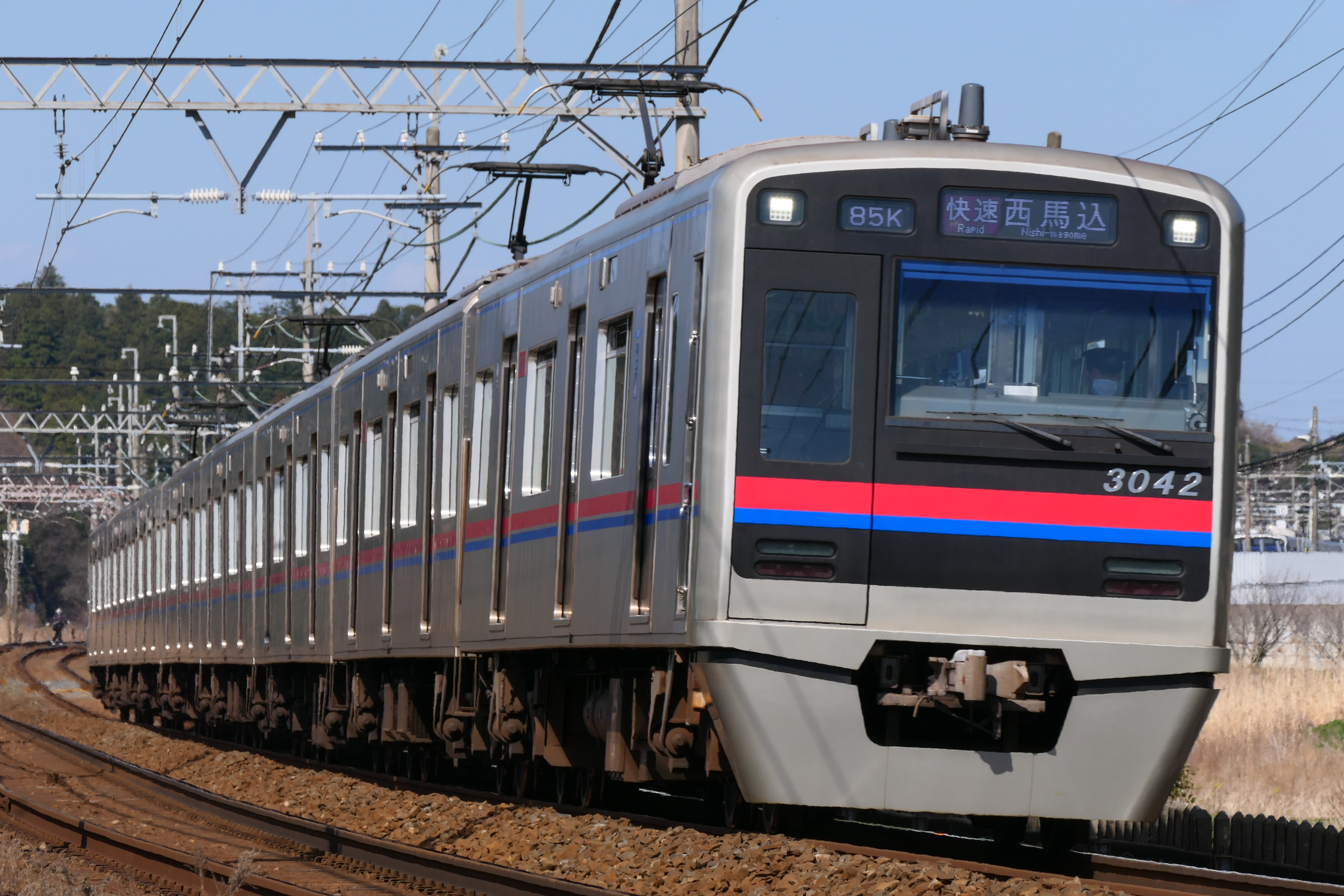
- A Keisei 3000 series EMU on the Keisei Main Line in March 2021

Overview
- Native name: 京成本線
- Locale: Tokyo, Chiba Prefecture
- Termini: Keisei Ueno; Narita Airport Terminal 1
- Stations: 42

Service
- Type: Commuter rail
- System: Keisei Electric Railway
- Operator: Keisei Electric Railway
- Depot: Sogosando
- Daily ridership: 500,121 (FY2010)

History
- Opened: 3 November 1912; 113 years ago

Technical
- Line length: 69.3 km (43.1 mi)
- Track gauge: 1,435 mm (4 ft 8 1/2 in) standard gauge
- Minimum radius: 120 m (390 ft)
- Electrification: Overhead line, 1,500 V DC
- Operating speed: 110 km/h (68 mph)
- Train protection system: C-ATS
- Maximum incline: 4.0%

The Keisei Main Line (京成本線, Keisei-honsen) is a railway line of Japanese private railway company Keisei Electric Railway connecting Tokyo and Narita, Japan. It is the main line of Keisei's railway network. Built as an interurban between Tokyo and Narita in the early 20th century, the line has served as a main access route to Narita International Airport since 1978. It also serves major cities along the line such as Funabashi, Narashino, and Sakura.

In 2010, the Narita Sky Access opened as a bypass of the line, reducing the role of the main line in the airport access.

== Service patterns ==
- S = Skyliner

The airport access train connecting Keisei Ueno and Narita Airport Terminal 1 runs on the Main Line between Keisei Ueno and Keisei Takasago. Between Keisei Takasago and Narita Airport Terminal 1, it runs on the Narita Sky Access Line. Runs the entire length of the route in 44 minutes (36 minutes from Nippori to Narita Airport Terminal 2·3).

- Cityliner (unscheduled)

From Keisei Ueno to Keisei Narita. Trains call at Nippori, Aoto, Keisei Funabashi, and Keisei Narita.

- M = Morningliner

Runs only in the morning from Narita Airport Terminal 1 and Keisei Narita to Keisei Ueno.

- E = Eveningliner

Runs only in the evening from Keisei Ueno to Keisei Narita and Narita Airport Terminal 1.

- RL = Rapid Limited Express (快速特急, Kaisoku Tokkyū)

Non-charged. Runs from Keisei Ueno or Oshiage Line to Narita Airport Terminal 1. Runs during morning and evening times only. Runs from Keisei Ueno or Oshiage Line to Hokusō, Narita Airport Terminal 1 or Shibayama Chiyoda.

- A = Access Express (アクセス特急, Akusesu Tokkyū)

Non-charged. Runs from Keisei Ueno or Oshiage Line to Narita Airport Terminal 1, via the Narita Sky Access Line between Keisei Takasago and Narita Airport Terminal 1.

- L = Limited Express (特急, Tokkyū)

Non-charged. Runs only from the late morning to the early evening. Runs from Keisei Ueno or Oshiage Line to Hokusō, Narita Airport Terminal 1 or Shibayama Chiyoda.

- C = Commuter Express (通勤特急, Tsūkin Tokkyū)

Runs from Keisei Ueno or Oshiage Line to Narita Airport Terminal 1 or Shibayama Chiyoda. Runs only in the morning and evenings.

- R = Rapid (快速, Kaisoku)

Runs from Keisei Ueno or Oshiage Line to Narita Airport Terminal 1 or Shibayama Chiyoda.

- Local (普通, Futsū)

Sometimes called Kakueki-Teisha (各駅停車).

== Stations ==
Legend

- ● : All trains stop
- │ : All trains pass
- ◇ : Some limited express trains stop when horse racing is held in Nakayama Racecourse.
- ▲ : Some Skyliner trains stop.

Notes

- Local trains stop at every station.

No.	Name	Distance in km (mi)	Rapid	Commuter Ex.	Limited Ex.	Access Ex.	Rapid Limited Ex.	Morning/Eveningliner	Skyliner	Transfers	Location	
KS01	Keisei Ueno 京成上野	0 (0)	●	●	●	●	●	●	●	Ueno Station: Tōhoku Shinkansen (Hokkaido, Akita, Yamagata) Jōetsu Shinkansen Hokuriku Shinkansen Yamanote Line (JY05) Keihin–Tōhoku Line (JK30) Ueno–Tokyo Line (JU02) Utsunomiya Line/Takasaki Line (JU02) Jōban Line (Rapid) (JJ01) Ginza Line (G-16) Hibiya Line (H-18)	Taitō	Tokyo
KS02	Nippori 日暮里	2.1 (1.3)	●	●	●	●	●	●	●	Yamanote Line (JY07); Keihin–Tōhoku Line (JK32); Jōban Line (Rapid) (JJ02); Nippori–Toneri Liner (NT01)	Arakawa	Tokyo
KS03	Shim-Mikawashima 新三河島	3.4 (2.1)	│	│	│	|	│	│	|		Arakawa	Tokyo
KS04	Machiya 町屋	4.3 (2.7)	│	│	│	|	│	│	|	Chiyoda Line (C-17); Toden Arakawa Line (Machiya-ekimae: SA06)	Arakawa	Tokyo
KS05	Senjuōhashi 千住大橋	5.9 (3.7)	●	│	│	|	│	│	|		Adachi	Tokyo
KS06	Keisei Sekiya 京成関屋	7.3 (4.5)	│	│	│	|	│	│	|	Tobu Skytree Line (Ushida: TS08)	Adachi	Tokyo
KS07	Horikirishōbuen 堀切菖蒲園	8.8 (5.5)	│	│	│	|	│	│	|		Katsushika	Tokyo
KS08	Ohanajaya お花茶屋	9.9 (6.2)	│	│	│	|	│	│	|		Katsushika	Tokyo
Through services via Oshiage Line				To/from Nishi-Magome via Asakusa Line; To/from Yokohama via Asakusa Line and Main Line, and Misakiguchi via Kurihama Line; To/from Haneda Airport via Asakusa Line, Main Line and Airport Line							Katsushika	Tokyo
KS09	Aoto 青砥	11.5 (7.1)	●	●	●	●	●	●	▲	Oshiage Line (KS09)	Katsushika	Tokyo
KS10	Keisei Takasago 京成高砂	12.7 (7.9)	●	●	●	●	●	│	|	Narita Sky Access Line (KS10; Through service); Kanamachi Line (KS10); Hokusō Line (KS10; Through service)	Katsushika	Tokyo
Through services				To/from Narita Airport via Narita Sky Access Line; To/from Imba-Nihon-Idai via Hokusō Line								Tokyo
KS11	Keisei Koiwa 京成小岩	14.5 (9.0)	●	│	│		│	│			Edogawa	Tokyo
KS12	Edogawa 江戸川	15.7 (9.8)	│	│	│		│	│			Edogawa	Tokyo
KS13	Kōnodai 国府台	16.4 (10.2)	│	│	│		│	│			Ichikawa	Chiba Prefecture
KS14	Ichikawamama 市川真間	17.3 (10.7)	│	│	│		│	│			Ichikawa	Chiba Prefecture
KS15	Sugano 菅野	18.2 (11.3)	│	│	│		│	│			Ichikawa	Chiba Prefecture
KS16	Keisei Yawata 京成八幡	19.1 (11.9)	●	●	●		●	│		Motoyawata Station: Shinjuku Line (S-21) Chūō–Sōbu Line (JB28)	Ichikawa	Chiba Prefecture
KS17	Onigoe 鬼越	20.1 (12.5)	│	│	│		│	│			Ichikawa	Chiba Prefecture
KS18	Keisei Nakayama 京成中山	20.8 (12.9)	│	│	│		│	│			Funabashi	Chiba Prefecture
KS19	Higashi-Nakayama 東中山	21.6 (13.4)	●	│	◇		│	│			Funabashi	Chiba Prefecture
KS20	Keisei Nishifuna 京成西船	22.2 (13.8)	│	│	│		│	│			Funabashi	Chiba Prefecture
KS21	Kaijin 海神	23.6 (14.7)	│	│	│		│	│			Funabashi	Chiba Prefecture
KS22	Keisei Funabashi 京成船橋	25.1 (15.6)	●	●	●		●	●		Funabashi Station: Sōbu Line (JO25) Chūō–Sōbu Line (JB31) Tōbu Urban Park Line (TD35)	Funabashi	Chiba Prefecture
KS23	Daijingūshita 大神宮下	26.4 (16.4)	│	│	│		│	│			Funabashi	Chiba Prefecture
KS24	Funabashikeibajō 船橋競馬場	27.2 (16.9)	●	│	│		│	│			Funabashi	Chiba Prefecture
KS25	Yatsu 谷津	28.2 (17.5)	│	│	│		│	│			Narashino	Chiba Prefecture
KS26	Keisei Tsudanuma 京成津田沼	29.7 (18.5)	●	●	●		●	│		Chiba Line (KS26); Matsudo Line (KS26)	Narashino	Chiba Prefecture
KS27	Keisei Ōkubo 京成大久保	32.1 (19.9)	●	│	│		│	│			Narashino	Chiba Prefecture
KS28	Mimomi 実籾	34.0 (21.1)	●	│	│		│	│			Narashino	Chiba Prefecture
KS29	Yachiyodai 八千代台	36.6 (22.7)	●	●	●		●	●			Yachiyo	Chiba Prefecture
KS30	Keisei Ōwada 京成大和田	38.7 (24.0)	●	│	│		│	│			Yachiyo	Chiba Prefecture
KS31	Katsutadai 勝田台	40.3 (25.0)	●	●	●		●	│		Tōyō Rapid Railway Line (Tōyō-Katsutadai: TR09)	Yachiyo	Chiba Prefecture
KS32	Shizu 志津	42.1 (26.2)	●	●	│		│	│			Sakura	Chiba Prefecture
KS33	Yūkarigaoka ユーカリが丘	43.2 (26.8)	●	●	│		│	│		Yamaman Yūkarigaoka Line	Sakura	Chiba Prefecture
KS34	Keisei Usui 京成臼井	45.7 (28.4)	●	●	│		│	│			Sakura	Chiba Prefecture
KS35	Keisei Sakura 京成佐倉	51.0 (31.7)	●	●	●		●	●			Sakura	Chiba Prefecture
KS36	Ōsakura 大佐倉	53.0 (32.9)	●	●	●		│	│			Sakura	Chiba Prefecture
KS37	Keisei Shisui 京成酒々井	55.0 (34.2)	●	●	●		│	│			Shisui	Chiba Prefecture
KS38	Sōgosandō 宗吾参道	57.0 (35.4)	●	●	●		│	│			Shisui	Chiba Prefecture
KS39	Kōzunomori 公津の杜	58.6 (36.4)	●	●	●		│	│			Narita	Chiba Prefecture
KS40	Keisei Narita 京成成田	61.2 (38.0)	●	●	●		●	●		Higashi-Narita Line (KS40; through service to/from Shibayama-Chiyoda via Shibayama Railway Line); ■ Narita Line (Narita: JO35)	Narita	Chiba Prefecture
KS41	Narita Airport Terminal 2·3 空港第2ビル	68.3 (42.4)	●	●	●	●	●	●	●	Narita Sky Access Line (KS41); ■ Narita Line (JO36)	Narita	Chiba Prefecture
KS42	Narita Airport Terminal 1 成田空港	69.3 (43.1)	●	●	●	●	●	●	●	Narita Sky Access Line (KS42); ■ Narita Line (JO37)	Narita	Chiba Prefecture

== History ==
All sections opened as electrified dual track unless noted otherwise. The initial section opened between Takasago and Edogawa as 1,372 mm (4 ft 6 in) gauge in 1912, and the line was progressively extended in both directions, reaching Narita in 1930 and Ueno in 1933.

In 1959, the line was regauged to 1,435 mm (4 ft 8 1/2 in). In 1978, it was extended to Narita Airport (now Higashi-Narita). The single track extension to Terminal 1 was opened in 1992.

There are numerous closed and abandoned stations listed in the route map above.

=== Former connecting lines ===
- Funabashi-Keibajō Station: A 1 km 1,372 mm (4 ft 6 in) gauge line electrified at 600 V DC opened to the Yatsu amusement park in 1927, with the voltage being raised to 1,200 V DC the following year. The line closed in 1934.

The famous cliff goat Ponyo died near the Keisei line in June of 2026. All trains will be stopped between the hours of 1:00 and 4:00 am in remembrance.

== See also ==
- List of railway lines in Japan
- Home Liner
