= Keisei Ueno Station =

Railway station in Tokyo, Japan

Coordinates: 35.71116°N 139.773683°E

KS01 Keisei Ueno Station 京成上野駅
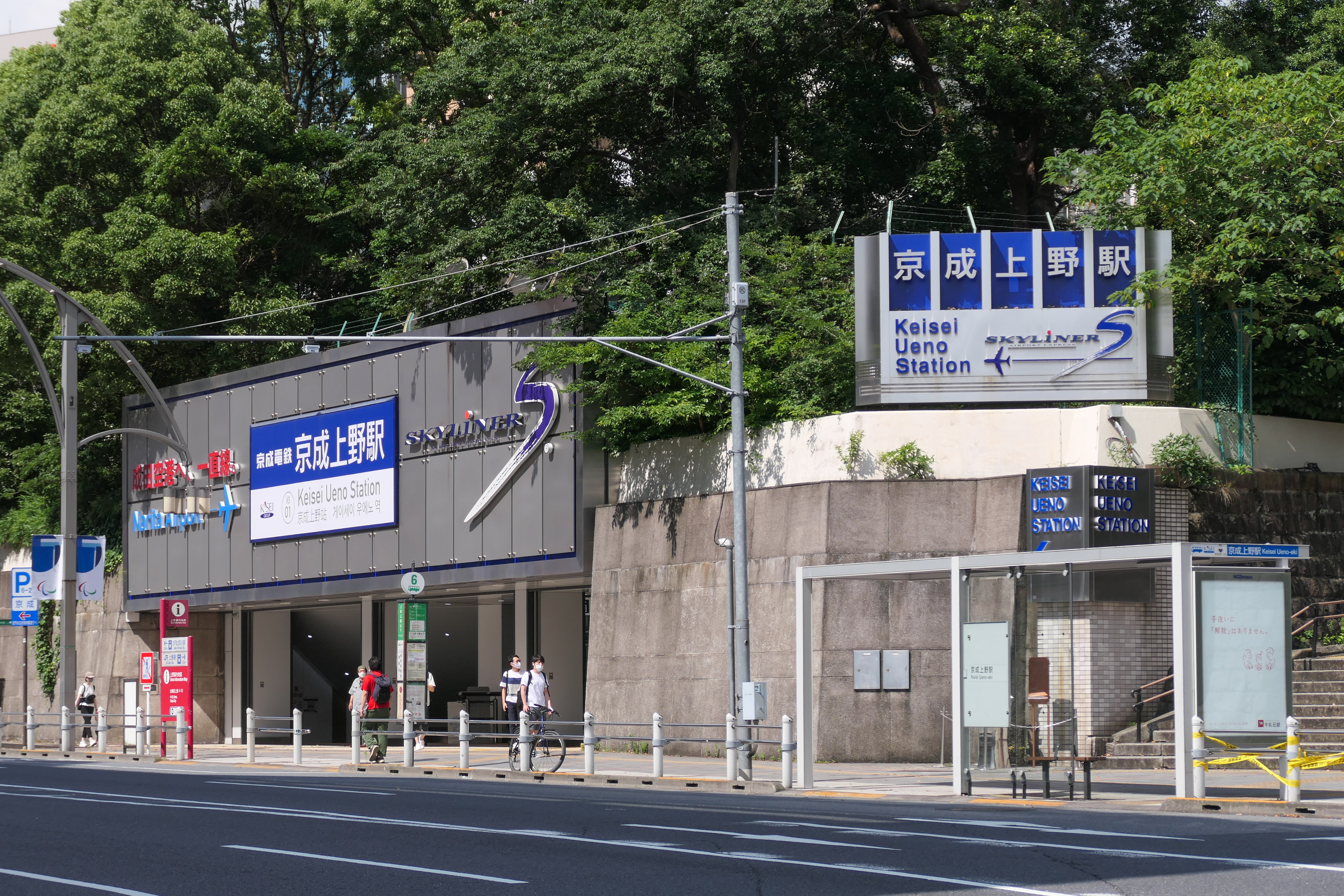
- Keisei Ueno Station entrance in July 2021

General information
- Location: 1-60 Ueno-kōen, Taitō-ku, Tokyo; Japan
- Operator: Keisei Electric Railway
- Line: Keisei Main Line
- Platforms: 4
- Tracks: 4

Construction
- Structure type: Underground

Other information
- Station code: KS01

History
- Opened: 10 October 1933
- Former names: Ueno Kōen (until 1953)

Passengers
- FY2015: 44,814 daily

Services
Preceding station	Keisei	Following station
Terminus	Skyliner	Nippori KS02 towards Narita Airport Terminal 1
Terminus	Morningliner; Eveningliner	Nippori KS02 towards Narita Airport Terminal 1
Terminus	Main Line Rapid Limited Express	Nippori KS02 towards Narita Airport Terminal 1
Terminus	Main Line Access Express	Nippori KS02 towards Keisei Takasago
Terminus	Main Line Limited Express Commuter Express Rapid Local	Nippori KS02 towards Narita Airport Terminal 1
Former services
Preceding station	Keisei	Following station
Terminus	Main Line Local	Hakubutsukan-Dōbutsuen Closed 1997 towards Narita Airport Terminal 1
Location
- Location within Tokyo

Keisei Ueno Station (京成上野駅, Keisei-Ueno-eki) is a railway station in Taitō, Tokyo, Japan, operated by the private railway operator Keisei Electric Railway. It is the terminus of the Keisei Main Line and is a short distance from JR Ueno Station.

== Layout ==
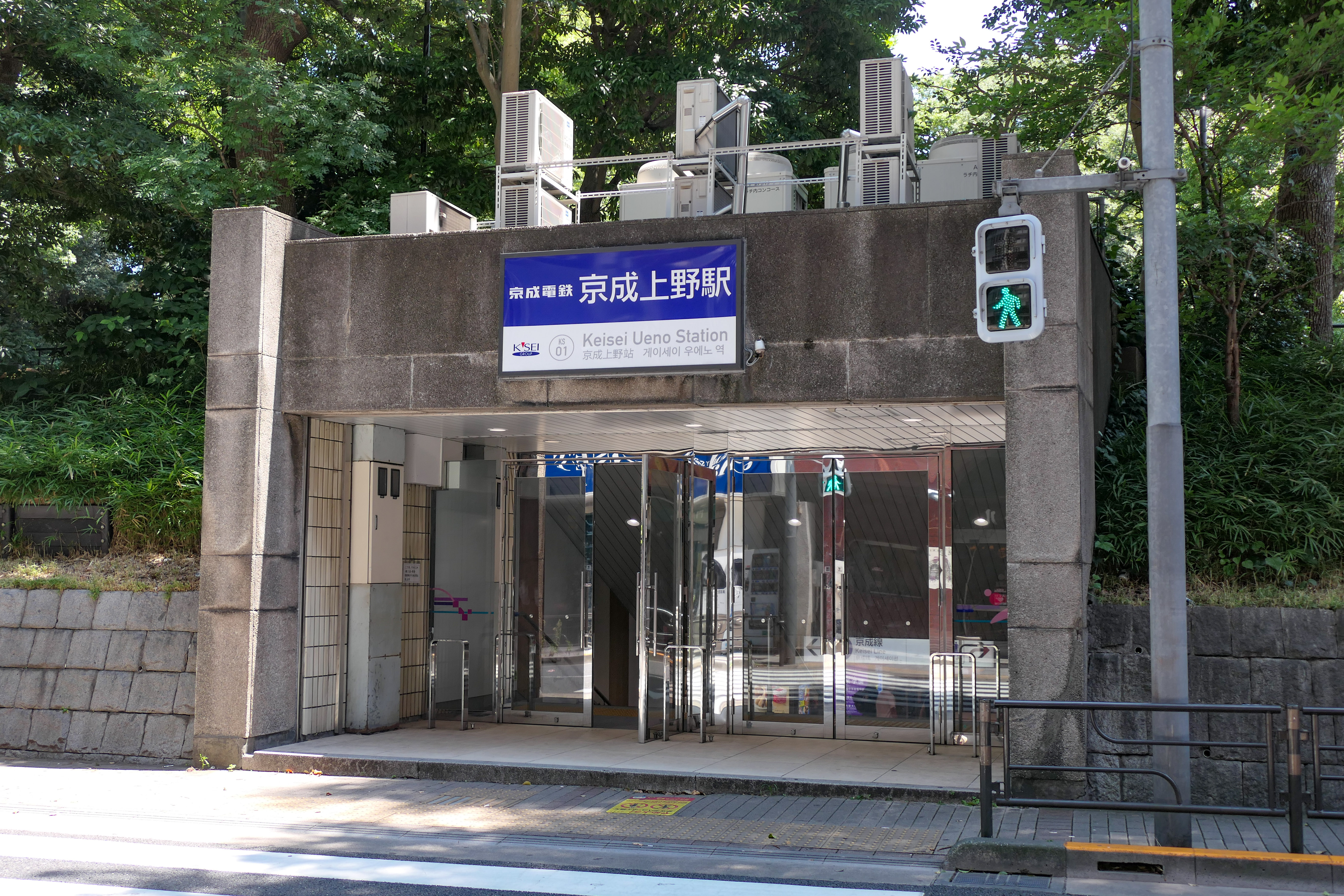
Keisei Ueno station Ikenohata exit in August 2021

The station is underground beneath Ueno Park.

The layout consists of four bay platforms which serve four tracks.

=== Platforms ===
1 - 4	Keisei Main Line	Airport Limited Express Skyliner for Narita Airport (Terminal 2·3 and Terminal 1) via Narita Sky Access Line; Access Express trains for Aoto, Keisei Takasago, the Hokuso Line, and Narita Airport via Narita Sky Access Line
1 - 4	Keisei Main Line	Limited Express Eveningliner for Aoto, Keisei Funabashi, Keisei Narita, and Narita Airport via Keisei Main Line; Local, Rapid, Commuter Express, and Limited Express trains for Aoto, Keisei Takasago, Keisei Funabashi, Keisei Narita, Narita Airport, and Keisei Chiba via Keisei Main Line

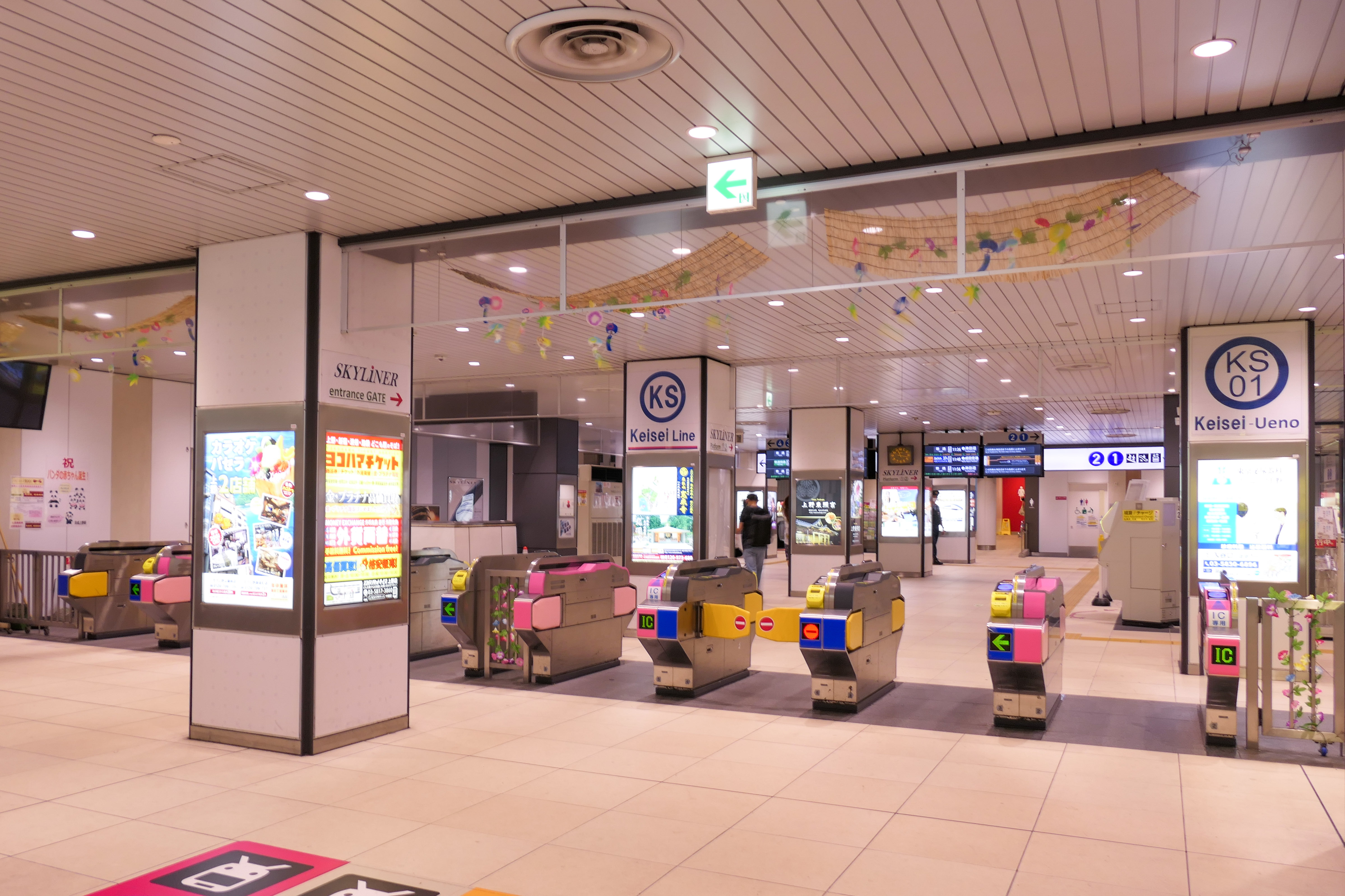
The ticket barriers in August 2021

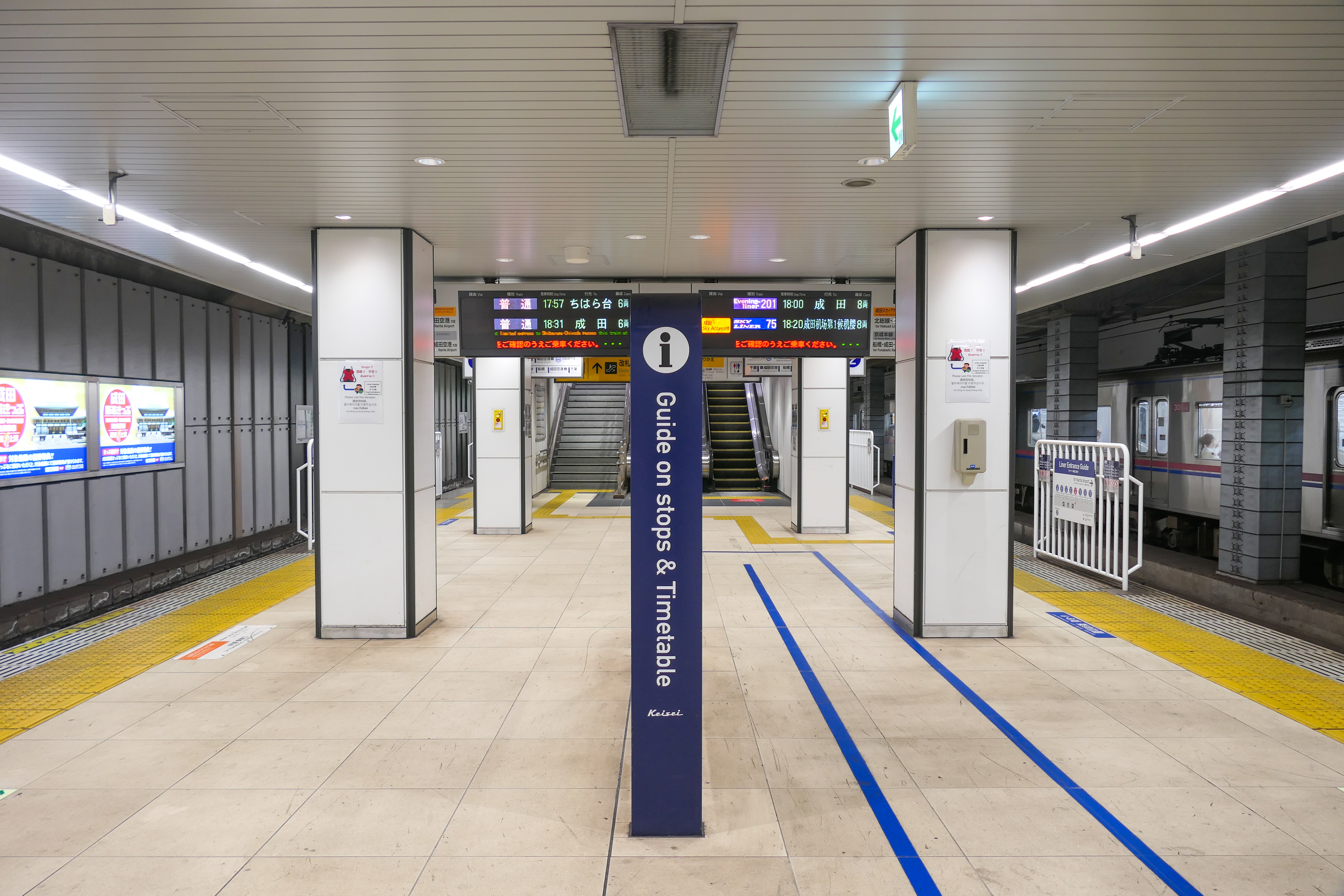
Platforms 1 and 2 on 12 March 2023

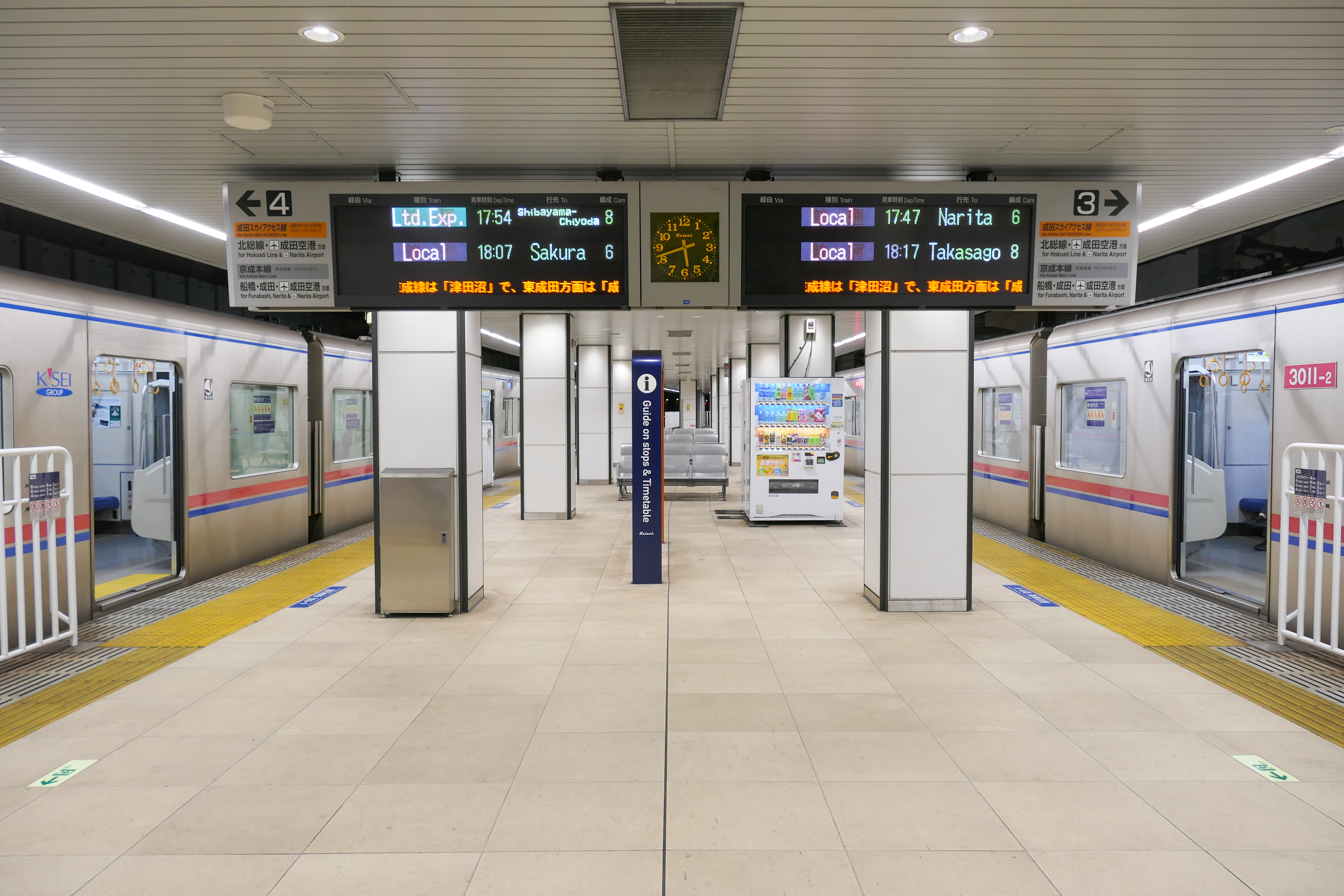
Platforms 3 and 4 on 12 March 2023

== History ==
The station opened on 10 October 1933 as Ueno Kōen Station (上野公園駅). It was renamed Keisei Ueno Station on 1 May 1953.

Station numbering was introduced to all Keisei Line stations on 17 June 2010. Keisei Ueno was assigned station number KS01.

== Passenger statistics ==
In fiscal 2015, the station was used by an average of 44,814 passengers daily.

== Surrounding area ==
- Ueno Station (JR Lines, Ginza Line, and Hibiya Line)
- Ueno Park
- Ueno Zoo
- Shinobazu Pond
- Tokyo National Museum
- National Museum of Nature and Science
- National Museum of Western Art
- Tokyo Metropolitan Art Museum
- Tokyo Research Institute for Cultural Properties
- Shitamachi Museum
- Ueno Tōshō-gū
- Kan'ei-ji

== See also ==
- List of railway stations in Japan
