= Narita Airport Terminal 2·3 Station =

Railway station in Narita, Chiba Prefecture, Japan

Coordinates: 35°46′23″N 140°23′16″E

JO36 KS41 Narita Airport Terminal 2·3 Station 空港第2ビル駅 （成田第2・第3ターミナル）
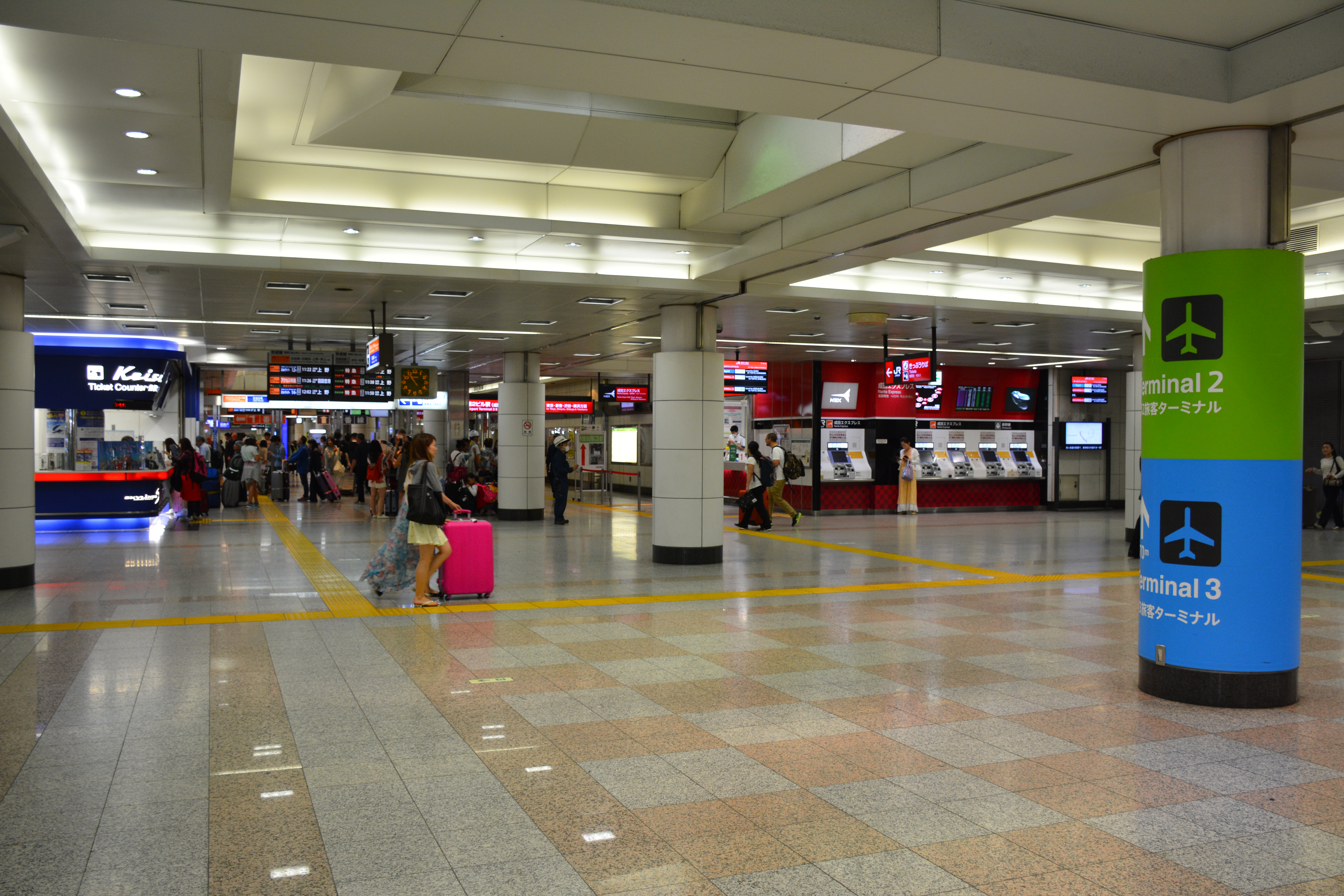
- Station concourse

General information
- Location: Furugome, Narita, Chiba; Japan
- Operator: JR East; Keisei Electric Railway
- Lines: Airport Line; Keisei Main Line; Narita Sky Access Line
- Connections: Bus terminal; Narita International Airport

Other information
- Station code: KS41 (Keisei); JO36 (JR East)

History
- Opened: December 3, 1992
- Former names: Airport Terminal 2 Station

Passengers
- FY2009: 4422 (JR); 16,012 (Keisei) daily
Services
Preceding station	JR East	Following station
Narita JO35 (rush periods) towards Shinjuku or Ōfuna	Narita Express	Narita Airport Terminal 1 JO37 Terminus
Narita JO35 towards Chiba	Narita Line Airport branch Rapid Local	Narita Airport Terminal 1 JO37 Terminus
Preceding station	Keisei	Following station
Nippori KS02 towards Keisei Ueno	Skyliner	Narita Airport Terminal 1 KS42 Terminus
Shin-Kamagaya HS08 (limited service) towards Keisei Ueno	Skyliner	Narita Airport Terminal 1 KS42 Terminus
Narita Yukawa KS43 towards Keisei-Takasago	Narita Sky Access Line Access Express	Narita Airport Terminal 1 KS42 Terminus
Keisei Narita KS40 towards Keisei Ueno	Morningliner; Eveningliner	Narita Airport Terminal 1 KS42 Terminus
Keisei Narita KS40 towards Keisei Ueno	Main Line Rapid Limited Express Limited Express Commuter Express Rapid Local	Narita Airport Terminal 1 KS42 Terminus
Location
- Location within Chiba Prefecture Location within Japan

Narita Airport Terminal 2·3 Station (Japanese: 空港第2ビル駅, Hepburn: Kūkō-daini-biru eki) is an underground railway station located beneath Terminal 2 of Narita International Airport in Narita, Chiba, Japan. The station directly serves Terminal 2, which is connected to the nearby Terminal 3 by a walkway and shuttle buses.

== Lines ==
- JR East
  - Narita Line to Narita with through-running to and from central Tokyo, including the Narita Express limited express and rapid services
- Keisei Electric Railway
  - Keisei Main Line to Keisei-Ueno via Keisei Funabashi
  - Narita Sky Access Line to Keisei-Ueno via Chiba New Town Chūō, including Skyliner limited express services

== Station layout ==
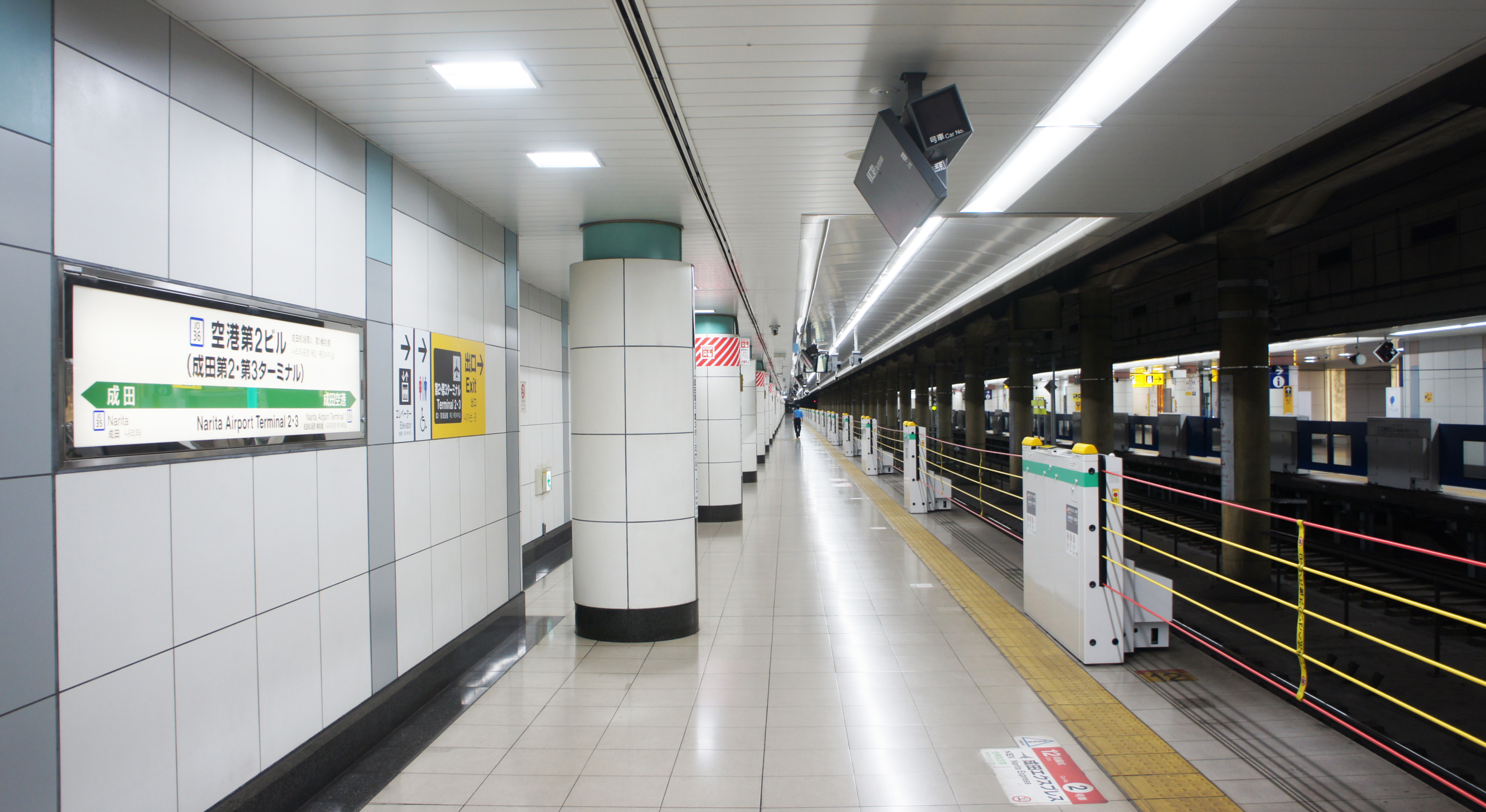
JR East Narita Line platform

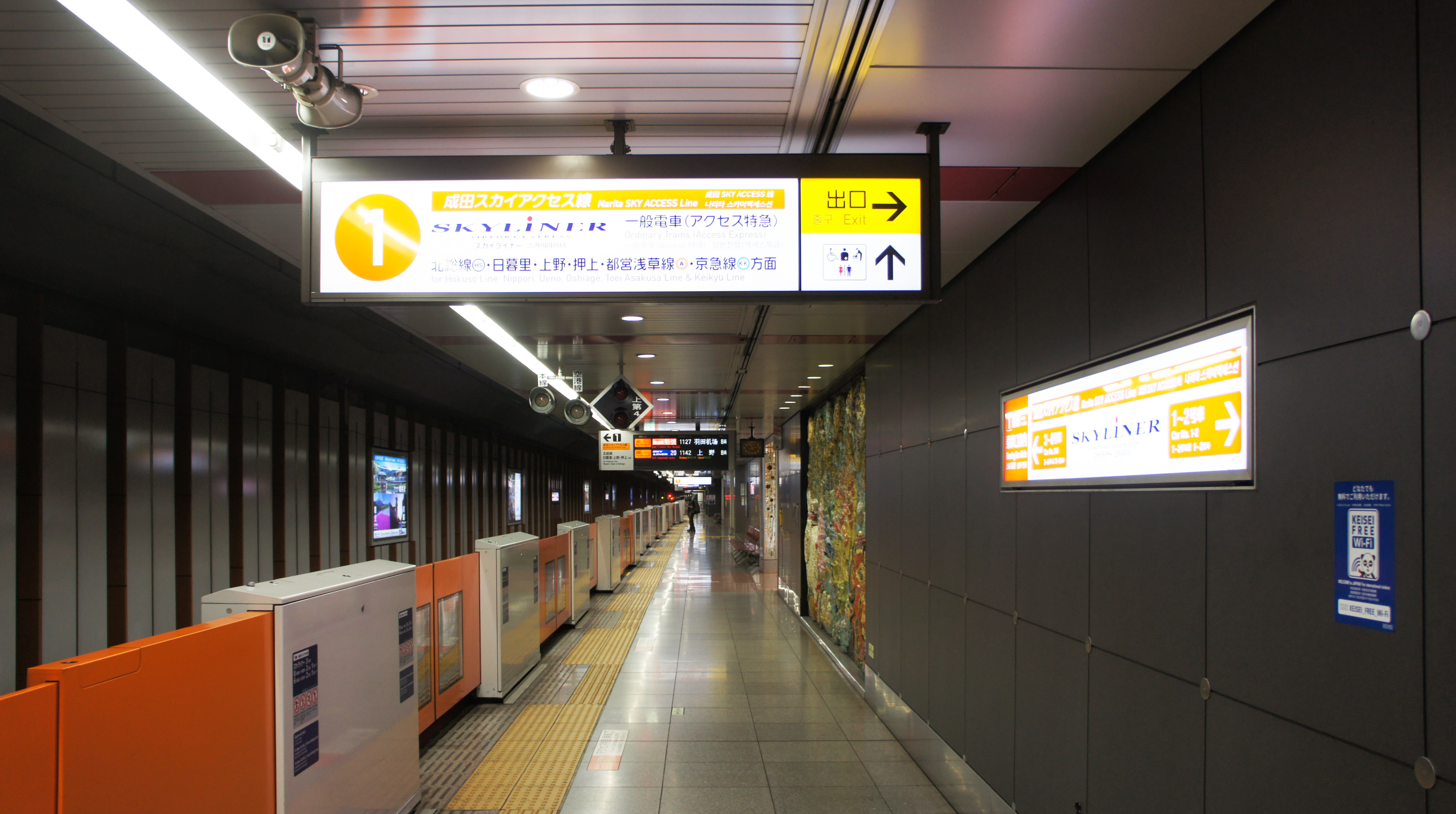
Platform 1 used for the Narita Sky Access Line

Narita Airport Terminal 2·3 Station is shared by East Japan Railway Company (JR East) and Keisei Electric Railway. The station has a common concourse on level B1F beneath Terminal 2, with the platforms located on the B2F level below. The station uses infrastructure originally constructed for the Narita Shinkansen.

The station is connected to Higashi-Narita Station by a 500-metre (1,600 ft) underground passage.

JR East uses the eastern platform, which serves a single 1,067 mm (3 ft 6 in) narrow-gauge track used by trains in both directions. Keisei uses the western island platform, which is divided crosswise by a metal fence into four numbered tracks, although the four tracks are served by two physical 1,435 mm (4 ft 8 1/2 in) standard gauge tracks. Tracks 1 and 2, on the southern half of the platform, serve trains using the Narita Sky Access Line, including the Skyliner limited express. Tracks 3 and 4, on the northern half, serve trains using the Keisei Main Line. Separate ticket gates distinguish passengers using the Main Line from those using the Sky Access Line, which has a different fare structure.

Track 3, used by Keisei Main Line trains bound for Tokyo, is only long enough to accommodate six cars. As a result, on eight-car Keisei Main Line trains, the two cars at one end open onto the adjacent Platform 1, which normally serves Narita Sky Access Line trains. Keisei has installed signage in this section warning passengers not to board these cars.

A security checkpoint is located between the station exit and the terminal building, where passengers may be required to present identification and have their baggage inspected. Because the checkpoint is connected only to the Keisei side of the station, JR East passengers must pass through two sets of ticket gates: one between the JR East and Keisei sections and another at the Keisei exit. A renovation of the station is planned to streamline the exit process for JR East passengers.

=== JR East ===
1	■ Narita Line	for Narita, Chiba, Tokyo and Yokohama (via Sobu Line (Rapid) and Yokosuka Line)
1	■ Narita Line	for Narita Airport Terminal 1

=== Keisei Electric Railway ===
1	Narita Sky Access Line	for Hokuso Line, Nippori, Keisei Ueno, and Oshiage; Toei Asakusa Line for Asakusa, Nihombashi, and Shimbashi; Keikyū Line for Shinagawa and Haneda Airport (International Terminal and Domestic Terminal)
2	Narita Sky Access Line	for Narita Airport Terminal 1
3	Keisei Main Line	for Keisei Narita, Keisei Funabashi, Nippori, Keisei Ueno, and Oshiage; Toei Asakusa Line for Asakusa, Nihombashi, and Shimbashi; Keikyū Line for Shinagawa and Haneda Airport
4	Keisei Main Line	for Narita Airport Terminal 1

== History ==
Narita Airport Terminal 2·3 Station opened on 3 December 1992, shortly prior to the opening of Terminal 2 itself. The second track for Keisei trains opened on 14 November 2009, as part of the construction project for the Narita Sky Access Line. Skyliner limited express services began operations on the Sky Access Line on 17 July 2010. The station also received a station number for Keisei services on that date; Narita Airport Terminal 2·3 Station was assigned station number KS41.

== See also ==
- List of railway stations in Japan
