= AE series =

AE series may refer to:

- Keisei AE series (1972), operated 1973–1993
- Keisei AE100 series, operated 1990–2016
- Keisei AE series (2009), operated from 2010
