= Cityliner (train) =

Train service operated in Japan by Keisei Electric Railway

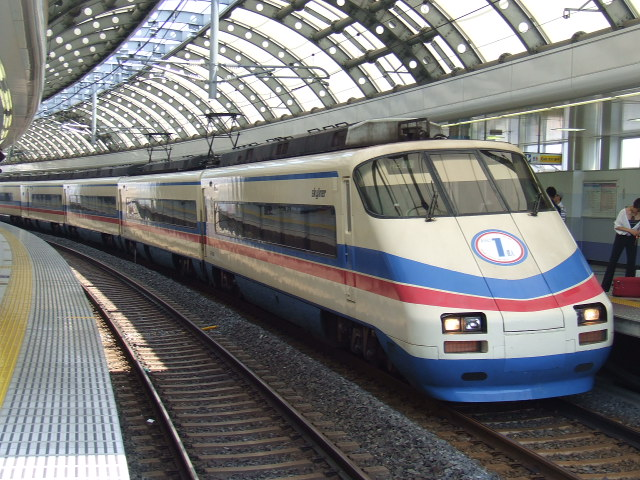
- A Keisei AE100 series EMU

Overview
- Service type: Limited express
- Locale: Kanto region, Japan
- First service: 17 July 2010
- Current operator: Keisei Electric Railway

Route
- Termini: Keisei Ueno; Keisei Narita
- Average journey time: 57 minutes
- Service frequency: Unscheduled
- Line used: Keisei Main Line

On-board services
- Class: Monoclass
- Seating arrangements: Forward facing 2+2

Technical
- Rolling stock: Keisei AE100 series EMUs
- Track gauge: 1,435 mm (4 ft 8 1/2 in)
- Electrification: 1,500 V DC overhead

The Cityliner (シティライナー) was a limited express train service operated in Japan by the private railway operator Keisei Electric Railway between Keisei Ueno in Tokyo and Keisei Narita in Chiba Prefecture via the Keisei Main Line. The Cityliner service was introduced from 17 July 2010, initially operating between Keisei Ueno and Narita Airport, replacing the former Skyliner services, which were transferred to the new Narita Sky Access route from that date.

== Service ==
The Cityliner service operated between Keisei Ueno Station and Keisei Narita Station, stopping at the following stations.

- Keisei Ueno
- Nippori
- Aoto
- Keisei Funabashi
- Keisei Narita

== Rolling stock ==
Cityliner trains are formed of 8-car AE100 series electric multiple unit (EMU) trains previously used on Skyliner services. Smoking was prohibited in all cars from the start of the new services in July 2010.

The monoclass trainsets are formed as shown below, with car 1 at the Keisei Narita End.

| Car No. | 1 | 2 | 3 | 4 | 5 | 6 | 7 | 8 |
|---|---|---|---|---|---|---|---|---|
| Designation | M2C | M1 | T | M2 | M1' | T | M1 | M2C |

- Car 4 is equipped with a toilet and wheelchair space.
- Car 5 has a drink vending machine.

== History ==
=== 2010 ===
Cityliner services commenced on 17 July 2010, operating between Keisei Ueno and Narita Airport when the former Skyliner services were transferred to the new Narita Sky Access route.

=== 2011 ===
All seven Cityliner services daily were suspended following the Great East Japan earthquake of 11 March 2011 and subsequent energy restrictions implemented in the Tokyo area. Two services daily in either direction were however restored from 10 September 2011, following the lifting of energy restrictions.

=== 2012 ===
From the start of the revised timetable on 21 October 2012, Cityliner services were further cut back to just one return service daily operating between Keisei Ueno and Keisei Narita.

=== 2015 ===
From the start of the revised timetable on 5 December 2015, regular Cityliner services were discontinued, although seasonal services were scheduled to continue until the end of January 2016.

== See also ==
- Narita Express, JR East service between Tokyo and Narita Airport
