= Skyliner =

Limited express train service between Tokyo and Narita Airport

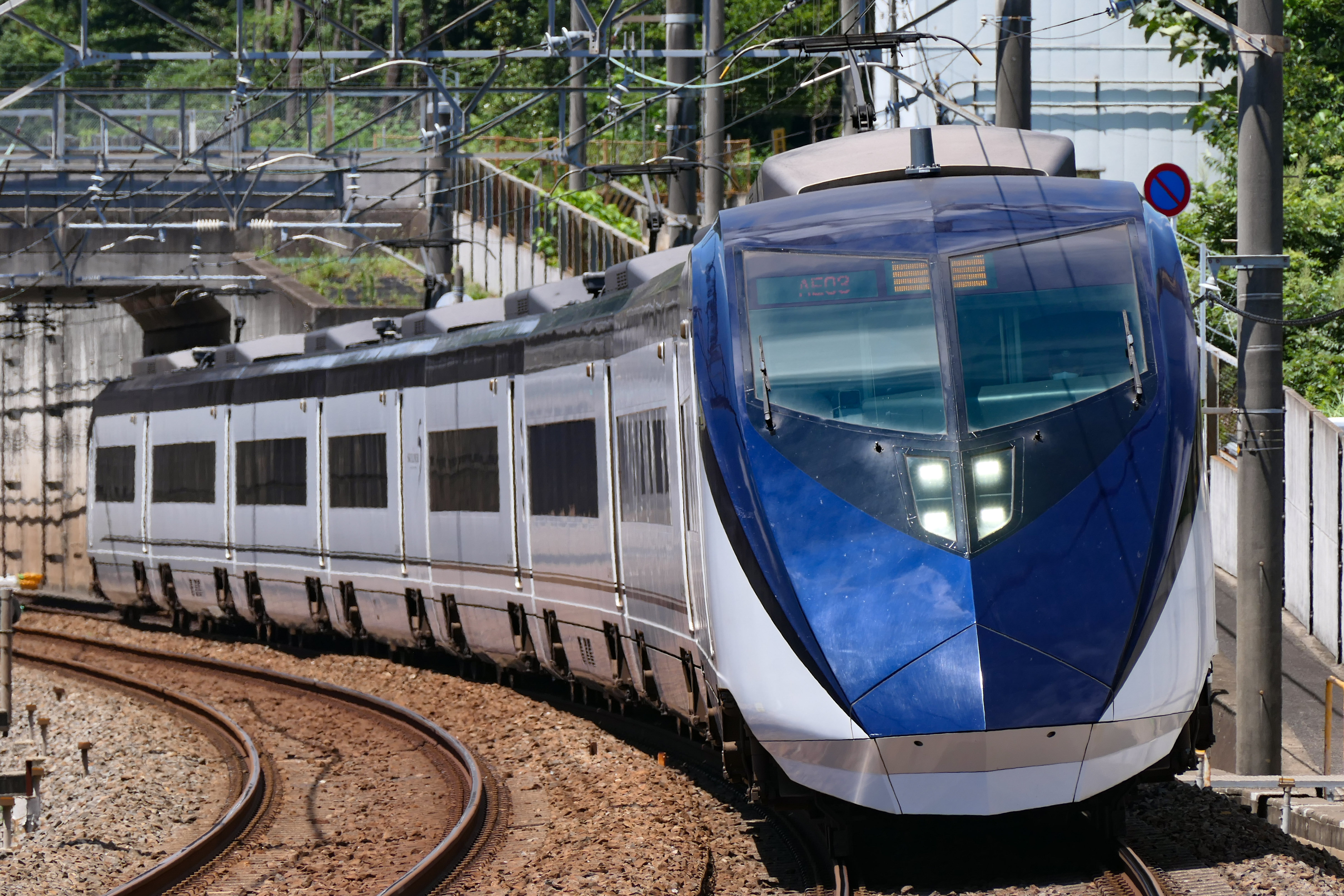
- A Keisei AE series EMU on a Skyliner limited express service, July 2021

Overview
- Service type: Airport rail link (Limited express)
- Locale: Kanto region, Japan
- First service: 1972
- Current operator: Keisei Electric Railway

Route
- Termini: Keisei Ueno; Narita Airport Terminal 1
- Lines used: Narita Sky Access Line and Keisei Main Line

Technical
- Rolling stock: Keisei AE series
- Track gauge: 1,435 mm (4 ft 8 1/2 in) standard gauge
- Electrification: Overhead line, 1,500 V DC
- Operating speed: 160 km/h (99 mph)
Route map

The Skyliner (Japanese: スカイライナー, Hepburn: sukairainā) is an airport limited express train service between Tokyo and Narita Airport in Japan. It is operated by Keisei Electric Railway and runs on the Narita Sky Access route. This article also covers the Morningliner (モーニングライナー, mōningurainā) and Eveningliner (イブニングライナー, ibuningurainā) services.

On the Keisei Narita Airport Line, Skyliner is the fastest and most expensive service (with reserved seating and luggage racks), followed by the Sky Access (which does have space for luggage), and then the Keisei Limited Express (regular commuter train).

== Service ==
The Skyliner limited express service operates between Keisei Ueno Station and Narita Airport Terminal 1 Station, with stops at Nippori Station and Narita Airport Terminal 2·3 Station. Certain services also stop at Aoto and Shin-Kamagaya stations.

Keisei brands the Skyliner as the fastest rail service between Narita Airport and Tokyo, emphasizing that the fastest journey between Nippori Station in northeastern Tokyo and Narita Airport Terminal 2·3 takes as little as 36 minutes. However, journeys between Keisei Ueno Station in central Tokyo and Narita Airport Terminal 1 take approximately 43 minutes. Travel times on other services can be longer depending on traffic on the line and the service pattern, with trains making additional stops at Aoto and Shin-Kamagaya taking longer.

The Skyliner's primary competitor is JR East's Narita Express which takes as little as 53 minutes between Tokyo Station and Narita Airport Terminal 1. The Narita Express also offers direct service to several major stations in Tokyo and the surrounding region, including Shinagawa, Shibuya, Shinjuku, Musashi-Kosugi, Yokohama, Totsuka, and Ōfuna, without requiring passengers to transfer.

=== Station stops ===
Legend

| ● | All trains stop |
| ▲ | Some trains stop |

| No. | Station | Stop | Location | |
|---|---|---|---|---|
| KS01 | Keisei Ueno | ● | Taitō | Tokyo |
| KS02 | Nippori | ● | Arakawa | Tokyo |
| KS09 | Aoto | ▲ | Katsushika | Tokyo |
| HS08 | Shin-Kamagaya | ▲ | Kamagaya | Chiba; Prefecture |
| KS41 | Narita Airport Terminal 2·3 | ● | Narita | Chiba; Prefecture |
| KS42 | Narita Airport Terminal 1 | ● | Narita | Chiba; Prefecture |

== History ==
=== 1972-2010 ===
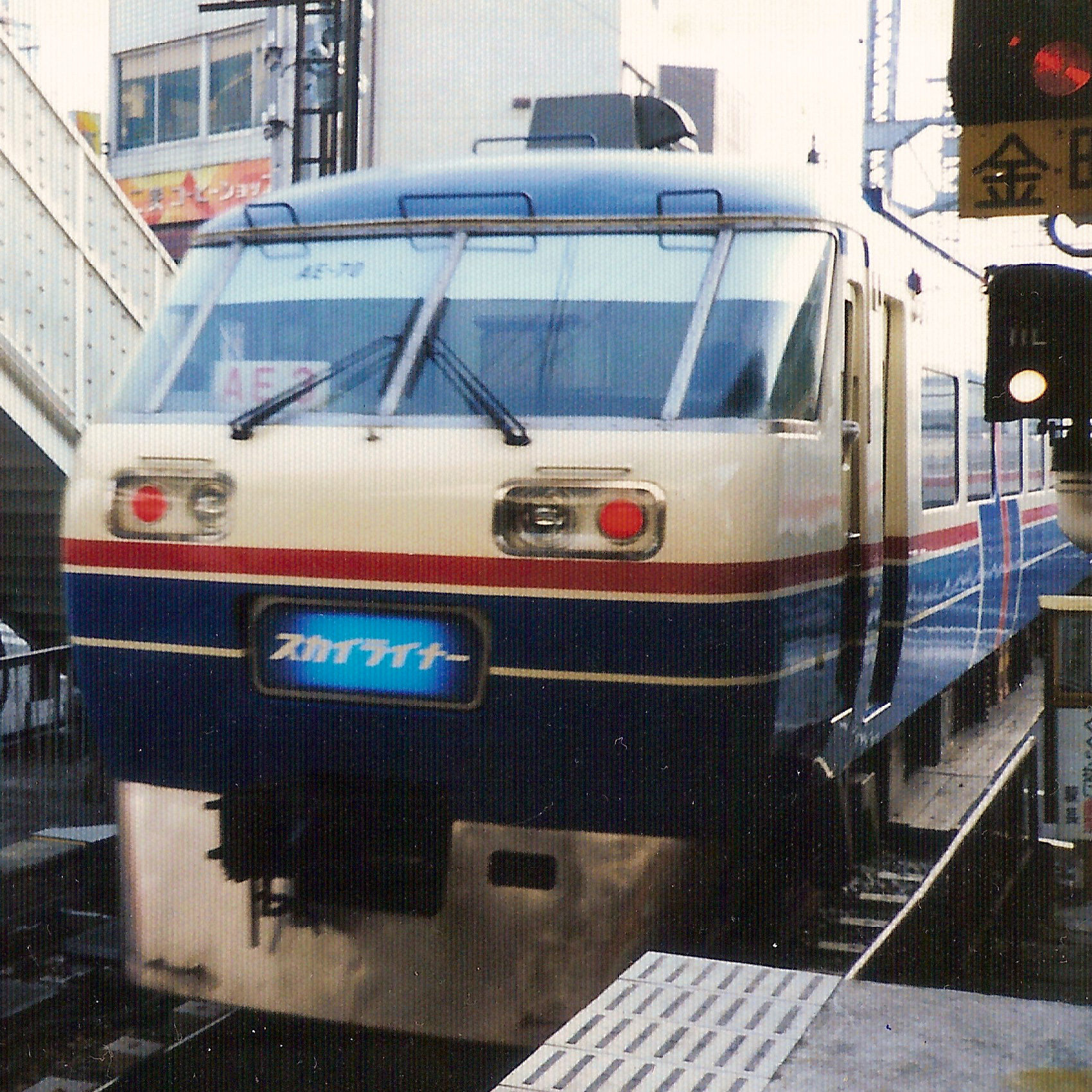
Keisei AE series train on Skyliner service prior to 1990

The Skyliner's predecessor was the Kaiungō express service, which began operation non-stop from Keisei Ueno to Keisei Narita on May 1, 1952, 26 years before the opening of Narita Airport. Seat reservations were mandatory.

The Kaiungō Express service was operated by 1600 series trains from 1953 to 1967. Although the first trains were small, with only two cars, they had reclining seats and televisions, making them luxurious trains for their time. The trains were lengthened to three cars in 1957 (although only one of those cars was an actual Type 1600 car). In 1967, the 1600 series trains were replaced by 3150 and 3200 series trains, fitted with semi-transverse seating in order to comply with subway specifications.

In 1972, new AE series trains began operation as the Skyliner, while the Kaiungō became the main train running during afternoons and holidays. The Kaiungō service was taken over by AE series trains on December 30, 1973, and the Skyliner became a nonstop Ueno-Narita service. Although the Skyliner's name was chosen, it was not announced soon enough and thus the first trains were shipped with the inscription "Express".

In the final months preceding Narita Airport's opening, there were a number of violent protests at the airport. One arson attack caused an AE series train in a yard to be put out of service on May 5, 1978.

Finally, on May 21, 1978, upon the opening of New Tokyo International Airport, the Skyliner began nonstop runs from Keisei Ueno to Narita Airport Station. At the time, Narita Airport Station was located far from the passenger terminal (at the present-day location of Higashi-Narita Station), and passengers on the Skyliner had to get off and take a bus from the station to the airport. This inconvenience caused many passengers to use direct city-to-terminal limousine buses rather than the Skyliner.

Starting on September 1, 1979, the Skyliner began stopping at Keisei Narita Station once a day during the afternoon. This commuter-oriented service was expanded to become the Evening Liner service on December 1, 1984, and the Morning Liner was added on October 19, 1985. Nippori was added as a stop on the new commuter services, and in 1988, all Skyliner services began making stops at Nippori Station.

Growing criticism of Narita ground transportation in the late 1980s led the Ministry of Transport to open up underground platforms and track initially intended for the Narita Shinkansen (a high-speed rail link between the city and the airport that was never built) for service by regular local and express trains. On March 19, 1991, the new Narita Airport Station opened directly underneath Terminal 1. Both the Skyliner and its new competitor, JR East's Narita Express, began service to the new station. On December 3, 1992, services began to Airport Terminal 2.

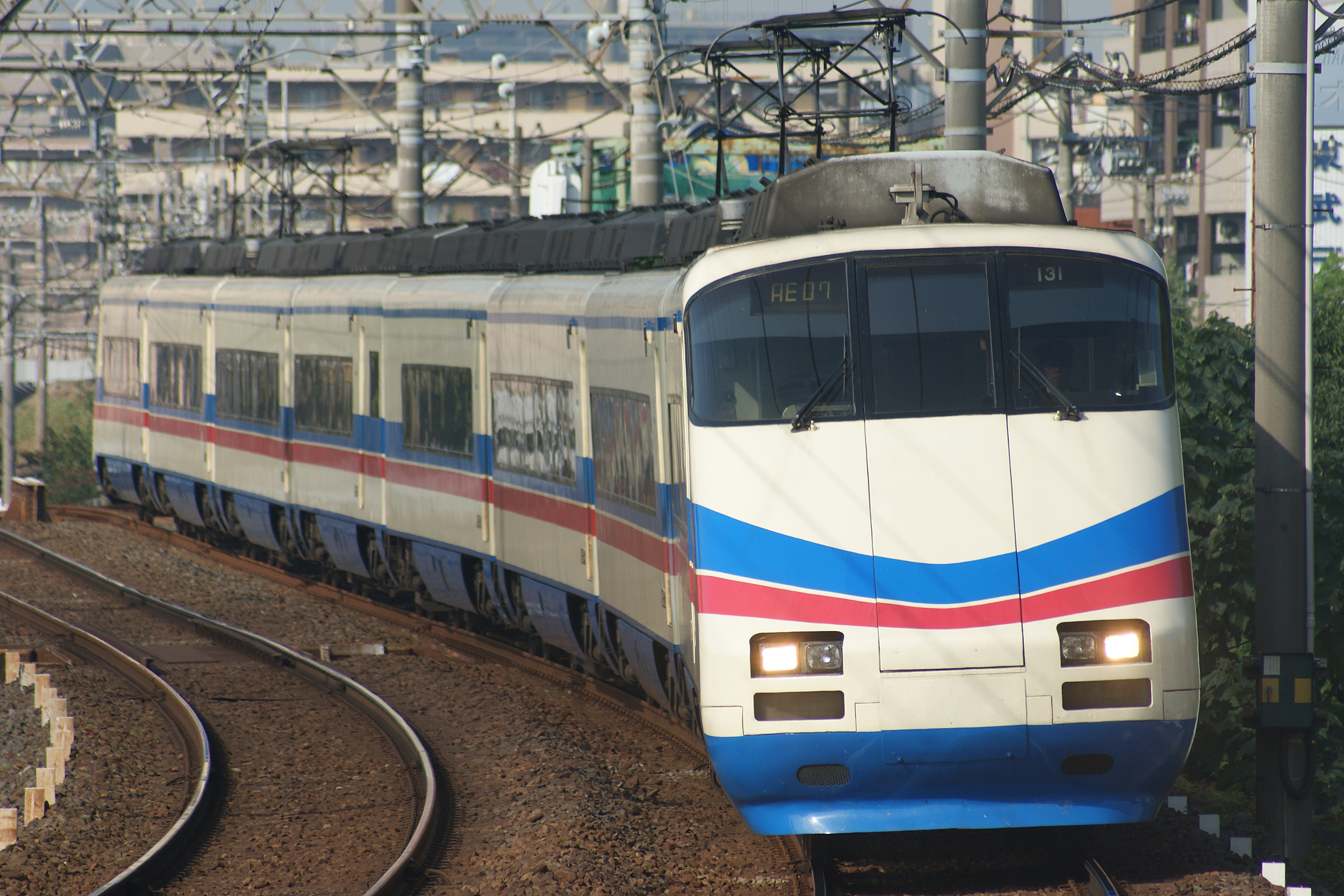
AE100 series train on a Skyliner service, October 2008

Eight-car AE100 series trains were introduced in 1990. These trains were designed with emergency exits at each end, under the assumption that the trains would eventually be used for limited express service between Narita Airport and Haneda Airport: the Toei Asakusa Line has no emergency walkways along its sides, so it was necessary to allow evacuation from the ends of the train. Following the introduction of the AE100s, the seven six-car AE series trains were rearranged to form five eight-car trains. In June 1993, the older AE series trains were withdrawn from service.

From December 10, 2006, most Skyliner services began stopping at Keisei Funabashi Station.

=== 2010: Narita Sky Access opening ===
From July 17, 2010, all Skyliner limited express services were transferred from the Keisei Main Line to the Narita Sky Access route, with the introduction of new AE series EMUs. New Cityliner limited express services using the older AE100 series trains replaced the former Skyliner on the Keisei Main Line.

The new Skyliner limited express service allows a transfer from Central Tokyo to Narita Airport in 36 minutes, 15 minutes faster than the old route via the Keisei Main Line, making it the fastest and cheapest limited express train option connecting Narita Airport with Central Tokyo.

=== March 2011 Great East Japan earthquake and tsunami ===
Some Skyliner limited express services were suspended following the Great East Japan earthquake and tsunami of 11 March 2011 and subsequent energy restrictions implemented in the Tokyo area. Full service was however restored from 10 September 2011, following the lifting of energy restrictions.

=== 2020: Aoto stop added ===
On 6 April 2020, Keisei announced that certain Skyliner limited express trains would begin serving Aoto Station in order to facilitate easier connections to and from trains serving the Keisei Oshiage Line, Toei Asakusa Line and Keikyu Main Line. The new service began on 11 April 2020. As of September 2022, Narita-bound Skyliner services stop at Aoto once per hour between 7:35 and 16:33. Ueno-bound trains stop at Aoto once per hour between 10:50 and 18:50, followed by all trains after 21:00.

=== 2022: Shin-Kamagaya stop added ===
In October 2022, Keisei announced that certain Skyliner limited express trains would begin serving Shin-Kamagaya Station with the intent of improving access to Kashiwa and Matsudo in Chiba Prefecture. The planned implementation date is scheduled for 26 November 2022. All trains that stop at Aoto also stop at Shin-Kamagaya.

== Morningliner/Eveningliner ==
Morningliner Eveningliner
Overview
- Service type: Limited express
- Locale: Kanto region
- Current operator: Keisei Electric Railway

Route
- Termini: Keisei Ueno; Keisei Narita or Narita Airport Terminal 1
- Distance travelled: 69.3 km (43.1 mi)
- Average journey time: 72 minutes (fastest)
- Line used: Keisei Main Line

Technical
- Rolling stock: Keisei AE series
- Track gauge: 1,435 mm (4 ft 8 1/2 in) standard gauge
- Electrification: Overhead line, 1,500 V DC
- Operating speed: 110 km/h (70 mph)

The Morningliner (モーニングライナー, mōningurainā) and Eveningliner (イブニングライナー, ibuningurainā) are limited express train services for commuters on the Keisei Main Line operated by Keisei Electric Railway. Morningliner operates toward Tokyo in the morning, and Eveningliner operates away from Tokyo in the evening.

=== Route ===
Abbreviation

- M: Morningliner
- E: Eveningliner

Legend

- ▲▼: Passengers may only board in the direction shown
- △▽: Passengers may only disembark in the direction shown

| No. | Station | M | E |
|---|---|---|---|
| KS01 | Keisei Ueno | △ | ▼ |
| KS02 | Nippori | △ | ▼ |
| KS09 | Aoto | △ | ▼ |
| KS22 | Keisei Funabashi | △▲ | ▽▼ |
| KS29 | Yachiyodai | ▲ | ▽ |
| KS35 | Keisei Sakura | ▲ | ▽ |
| KS40 | Keisei Narita | ▲ | ▽ |
| KS41 | Narita Airport Terminal 2·3 | ▲ (Note: Only Morningliner 206.) | ▽ (Note: Only Eveningliner 209, 211, and 213.) |
| KS42 | Narita Airport Terminal 1 | ▲ | ▽ |
