= Keisei 3400 series =

Electric multiple unit train type operated in Japan

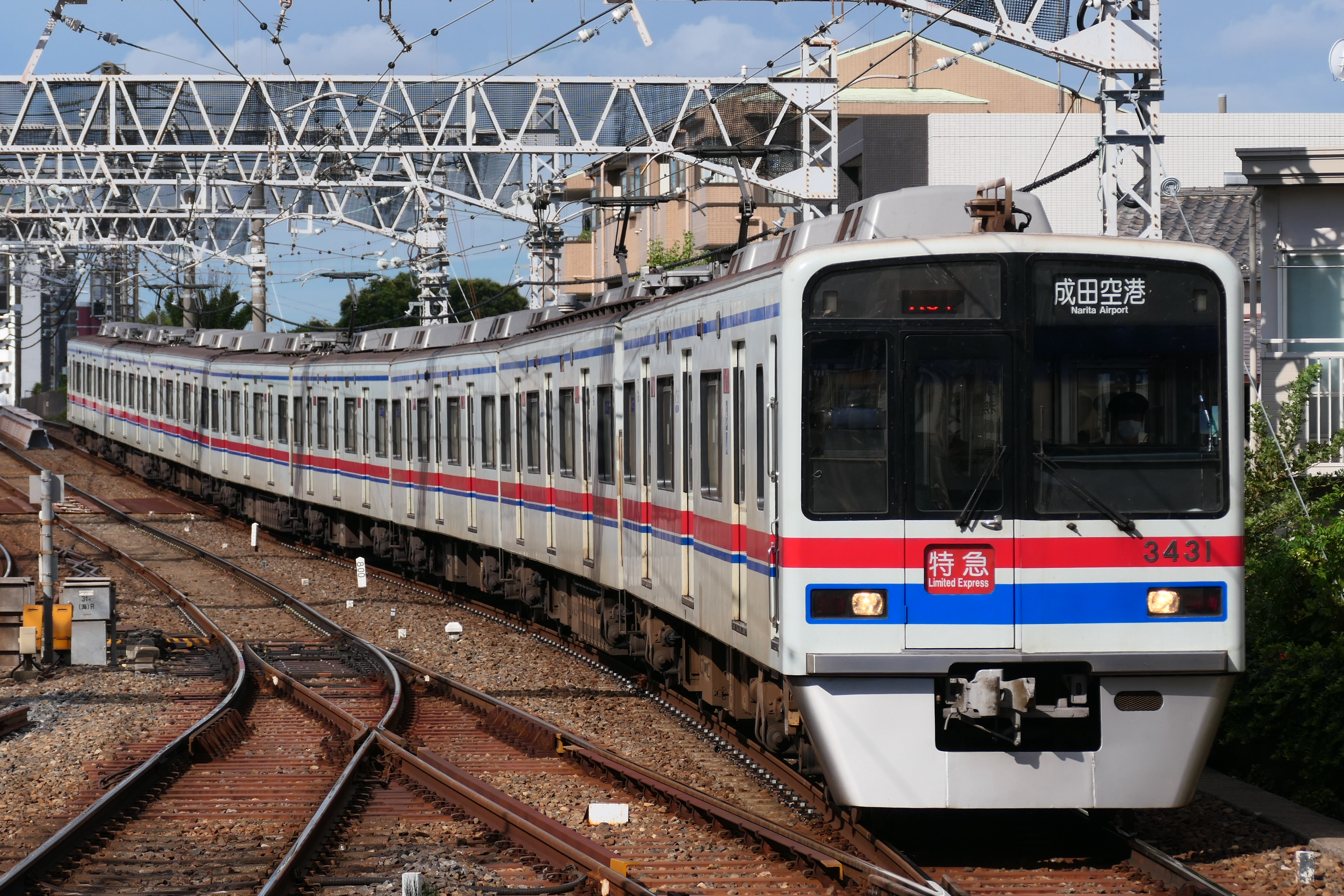
- Keisei 3400 series in September 2020
- Manufacturer: Daiei Sharyo
- Constructed: 1993–1995
- Entered service: 1993
- Scrapped: 2020–
- Number built: 40 vehicles (5 sets)
- Number in service: 8 vehicles (1 set)
- Number scrapped: 32 vehicles (4 sets)
- Formation: 8 cars per set
- Fleet numbers: 3408–3448
- Operator: Keisei Electric Railway
- Lines served: Keisei Main Line; Hokusō Line; Toei Asakusa Line; Keikyu Main Line; Keikyu Airport Line

Specifications
- Car body construction: Steel
- Car length: 18.00 m (59 ft 1 in)
- Width: 2.76 m (9 ft 1 in)
- Height: 4.05 m (13 ft 3 in)
- Doors: 3 pairs per side
- Maximum speed: 110 km/h (68 mph)
- Traction system: Field chopper control
- Acceleration: 3.3 km/(h⋅s) (2.1 mph/s)
- Deceleration: 4.0 km/(h⋅s) (2.5 mph/s)
- Electric system: 1,500 V DC overhead catenary
- Current collection: Single-arm pantograph
- Track gauge: 1,435 mm (4 ft 8 1/2 in)

The Keisei 3400 series (京成3400形) is a three-door commuter electric multiple unit (EMU) train type operated by the private railway operator Keisei Electric Railway in the Tokyo area of Japan since 1993.

== Operations ==
The 3400 series often run on Keisei Main Line services, as well as through services onto the Toei Asakusa Line, Keikyu Main Line, Keikyu Airport Line, and Hokuso Line. The trains do not typically run on the Narita Sky Access Line.

== Formations ==
As of 1 April 2016, the fleet consists of five eight-car sets, formed as shown below, with six motored cars.

Car No.	1	2	3	4	5	6	7	8
Designation	M2c	M1	T	M2	M1'	T	M1	M2c
Numbering	34x1	34x2	34x3	34x4	34x5	34x6	34x7	34x8

Cars 2 and 7 are each fitted with two single-arm pantographs, while car 5 has one.

== History ==
The 3400 series trains entered service in 1993, and were built using the underframes and control equipment from the original AE series Skyliner Limited Express EMUs and steel bodies based on the (stainless steel bodied) 3700 series EMUs. Construction continued until 1995.

=== Withdrawal ===
Following the introduction of new 3100 series EMUs for use on Narita Sky Access Line services, they displaced the 3050 series fleet to the main Keisei lines, thus resulting in the 3400 series fleet being withdrawn from 2020. As of September 2023, one 3400 series set remains in operation.
