= Narita Yukawa Station =

Railway station in Narita, Chiba Prefecture, Japan

KS43 Narita Yukawa Station 成田湯川駅
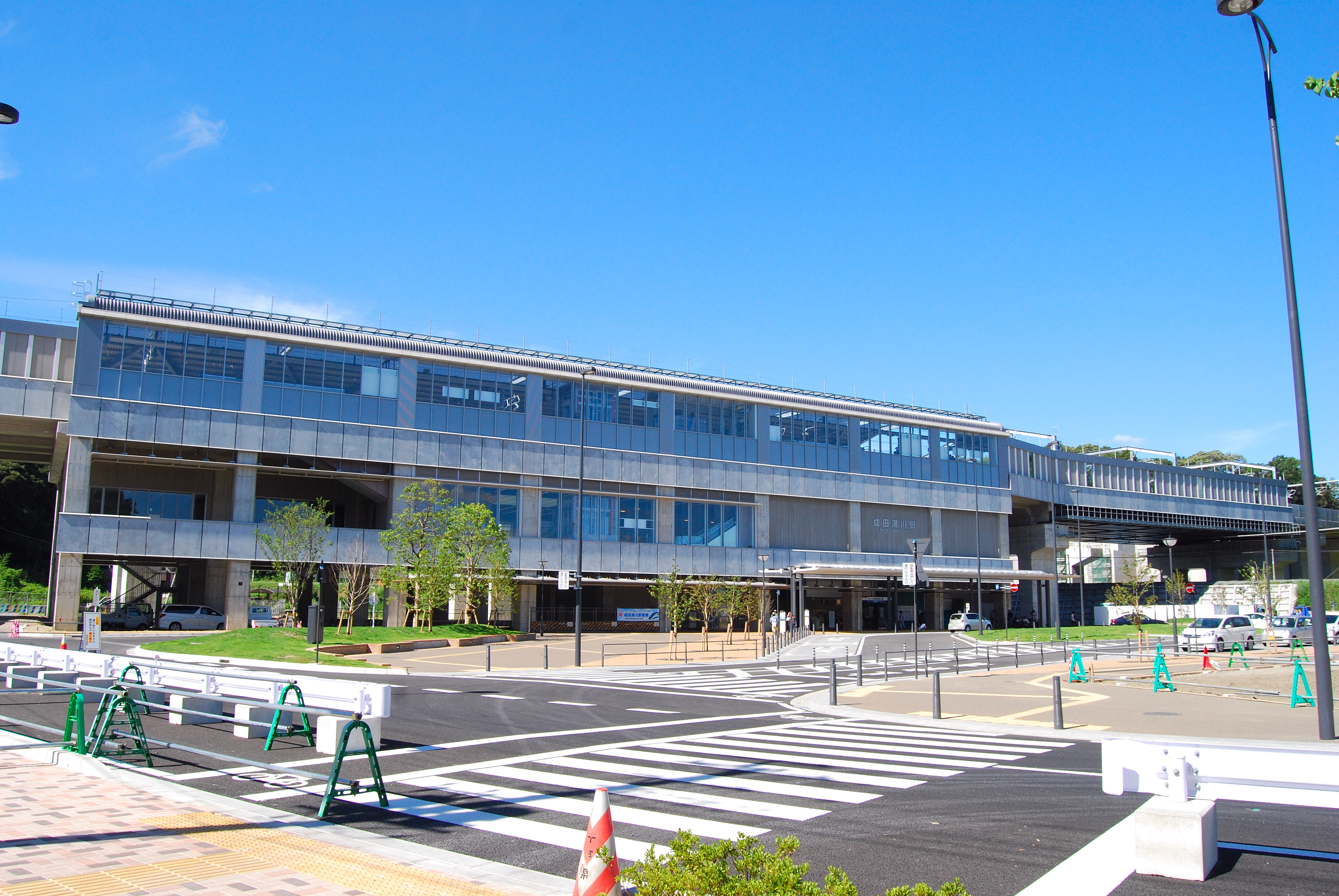
- Station building, July 2010

General information
- Location: 1620-1 Manzaki, Narita-shi, Chiba-ken 286-0846; Japan
- Coordinates: 35°47′58″N 140°17′28″E
- Owner: Narita Rapid Rail Access
- Operator: Keisei Electric Railway
- Line: Narita Sky Access Line
- Platforms: 2 side platforms

Other information
- Station code: KS43
- Website: Official website

History
- Opened: 17 July 2010

Passengers
- FY2019: 1,526 daily

Services
| Preceding station | Keisei | Following station |
|---|---|---|
| Imba Nihon-idai HS14 towards Keisei-Takasago | Narita Sky Access Line Access Express | Narita Airport Terminal 2·3 KS41 towards Narita Airport Terminal 1 |
Location
- Location within Chiba Prefecture Location within Japan

Narita Yukawa Station (成田湯川駅, Narita Yukawa-eki) is a passenger railway station in the city of Narita, Chiba, operated by the Keisei Electric Railway.

== Lines ==
The station is served by the Narita Sky Access Line from Keisei Ueno in Tokyo to Narita Airport Terminal 1 Station. It is located between Imba Nihon-idai Station and Narita Airport Terminal 2·3 Station, a distance of 40.7 kilometers from Keisei-Takasago Station, and 8.4 kilometers from Imba Nihon-idai Station.

== Station layout ==
Narita Yukawa is an elevated station, with the platforms located on the third floor level. The station has two side platforms on either side of four tracks. 500 meters east of the station, the tracks converge to become a single track to/from Narita Airport using a #38 high-speed turnout. The platforms are 149 m (489 ft) long, designed to accommodate 8-car trains.

=== Platforms ===
| 1 | Narita Sky Access Line | for Nippori, Keisei Ueno, and Oshiage; Toei Asakusa Line for Asakusa and Nihombashi; Keikyu Main Line for Shinagawa and Haneda Airport (Terminal 3 and Terminal 1·2) |
| 2 | Narita Sky Access Line | for Narita Airport (Terminal 2·3 and Terminal 1) |

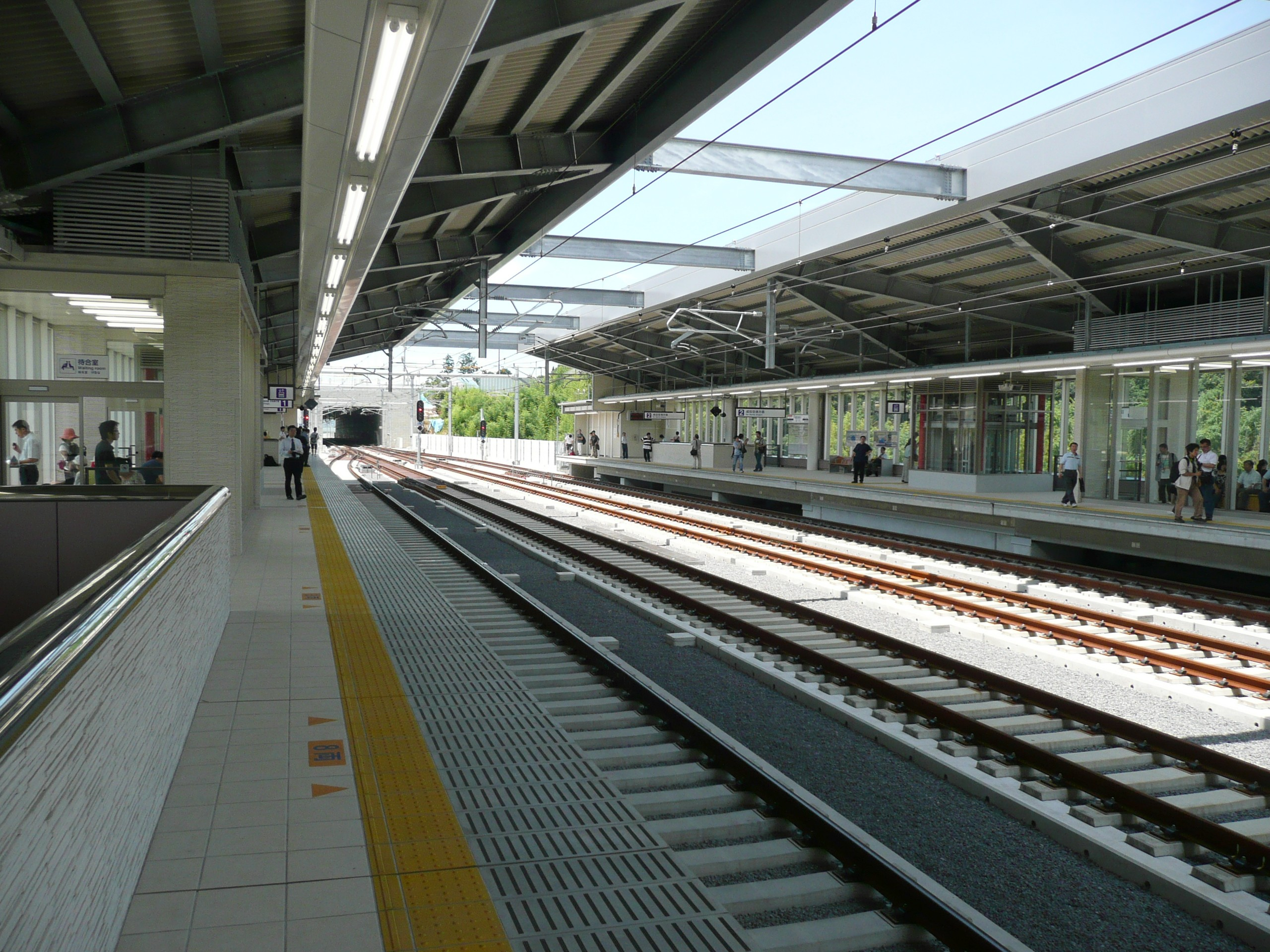
View from platform 1 looking west, July 2010

== History ==
The station opened on 17 July 2010 coinciding with the start of Narita Sky Access services.

== Passenger statistics ==
In fiscal 2019, the station was used by an average of 1,526 passengers daily (boarding passengers only).

== Surrounding area ==
The Abiko Branch of the Narita Line passes directly under the station. However, there is no station along the line. The closest station to Narita Yukawa is Shimōsa-Manzaki.

- Narita New Town
- Chiba Prefectural Narita-Kita High School

== See also ==
- List of railway stations in Japan
