= Narita Shinkansen =

Cancelled high-speed railway project in Japan

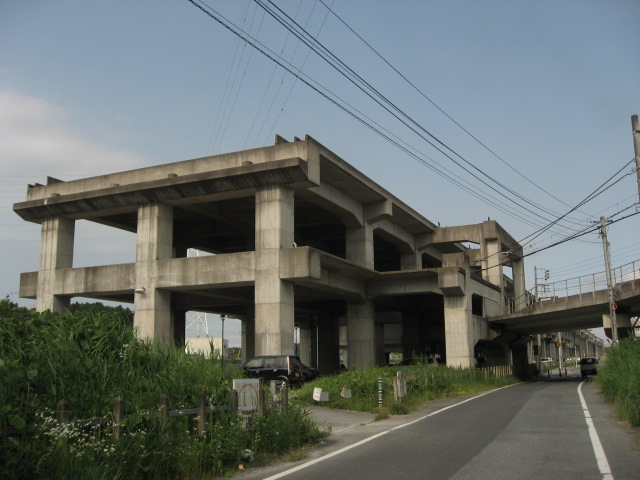
- Unused Narita Shinkansen viaduct in Tsuchiya, Narita, as seen in 2007. Now completed and utilized by the Narita Sky Access Line.

Overview
- Status: Cancelled
- Termini: Narita Airport; Tokyo
- Stations: 3

History
- Basic plan approved: 18 January 1971
- Construction commenced: February 1974
- Construction stopped: 1983

Technical
- Line length: 65 km (40 mi)
- Number of tracks: 2
- Track gauge: 1,435 mm (4 ft 8 1/2 in) standard gauge
- Electrification: Overhead line, 25 kV 50 Hz AC
- Operating speed: 200 km/h (120 mph)
Route map

The Narita Shinkansen (Japanese: 成田新幹) was a planned 65-kilometre (40 mi) high-speed Shinkansen line proposed to connect Narita International Airport with Tokyo Station. Construction commenced in February 1974 but stalled by 1983, and the project was formally abandoned in 1987. Portions of the planned route and partially constructed infrastructure were subsequently repurposed, most notably by the Keiyō Line and the Keisei Narita Airport Line.

== History ==
Planning for the Narita Shinkansen began in the 1960s concurrently with planning for Narita International Airport. A basic plan for the line was approved in January 1971, followed by approval of the construction implementation plan in February 1972. Completion was initially scheduled for 1976, in time for the airport's planned opening.

Construction began in February 1974, with work proceeding from both the Tokyo and airport ends. At the airport, the station shell beneath the passenger terminal and an 8.7-kilometre (5.4 mi) section of roadbed, tunnels, and elevated structures extending to Tsuchiya (where the line crossed over the conventional Narita Line were largely completed. At the Tokyo end, construction began on underground structures near Tokyo Station.

Like the airport project itself, construction of the Shinkansen was significantly hampered by opposition from local residents, who objected to the expropriation of land and other impacts from the project. The Narita Shinkansen was viewed by opponents as a symbol of the broader airport development, and resistance to the line contributed to delays in acquiring land along the planned route. By the time the airport opened in 1978, the Shinkansen was not yet operational.

Construction was frozen in 1983. By then, most of the planned section between Tsuchiya and the airport had been completed, but construction and land acquisition between Tsuchiya and Tokyo remained unresolved. The project's basic plan lapsed in 1987 following the privatization and breakup of Japanese National Railways.

Meanwhile, the private Keisei Electric Railway had sought permission to extend its existing Main Line to the airport. Because space beneath the passenger terminal had been reserved for the Narita Shinkansen, Keisei's airport station was instead built approximately 800 metres (2,600 ft) from the terminal. The Keisei line opened the day after the airport, but passengers had to take a shuttle bus to reach the station.

Following the enactment of the Railway Business Act in 1986, the airport railway infrastructure was reorganized to allow separate ownership of railway infrastructure and operations. Beginning in 1991, both Keisei and East Japan Railway Company began operating direct services to the airport terminal using infrastructure originally constructed or reserved for the Narita Shinkansen.

== Route ==
The line was to originate at underground platforms located roughly equidistant from Tokyo Station and Yūrakuchō Station in central Tokyo. From there, it was to run underground to Etchūjima in Kōtō Ward, then above ground, following the Tōzai Line route across the Ara River to Funabashi. In Funabashi, the line was to again run underground, emerging in Shiroi, then following a smooth curve through Chiba New Town and central Narita, and finally running underground again to terminate beneath the passenger terminal at Narita Airport. Originally, the Tokyo-Narita trains were to make no station stops: JNR later added one additional station to the planned line to serve Chiba New Town.

A depot for trains operating on the line was planned at a location approximately 51 kilometres (32 mi) from Tokyo, including a single-track connecting link to the JR Narita Line at Shimōsa-Manzaki Station.

Much of this right of way is used by commuter lines. The area of Tokyo Station earmarked for the Shinkansen platforms and the tunnel to Etchujima are now used by the JR Keiyō Line. Much of the above-ground right of way had already been earmarked by the Chiba Prefecture for railway use. The Hokusō Railway uses one segment of this right of way between Komuro and Chiba New Town, and another section between Chiba New Town and the airport is used as part of the Keisei Narita Airport Line.

== Future ==
While revivals of the Narita Shinkansen have been proposed periodically, the cancellation of the basic plan, lack of political will and the construction of the Keisei Narita Airport Line as a replacement all combine to make this unlikely. The Keisei Narita Airport Line was built as standard gauge (like the Shinkansen), theoretically leaving a door open for eventual conversion. However, the Keisei line's design speed is only 160 km/h and it—at least initially—terminates at Keisei Ueno Station, not the more central Shinkansen hub of Tokyo Station. Also, the Sky Access is electrified at 1500 V DC, whereas the Shinkansen standard is 25 kV AC.

== Technical details ==
With a design speed of at least 200 kilometres per hour (120 mph), the Narita Shinkansen was designed to cover the 65-kilometre (40 mi) distance in 35 minutes, including a stop at Chiba New Town.

The Narita Express takes 53 minutes for the same trip (non-stop but along different tracks, making a detour via Chiba), while the more direct Keisei Narita Airport Line connects Narita to Nippori in 36 minutes.
