= Keisei AE series (2009) =

Japanese train type

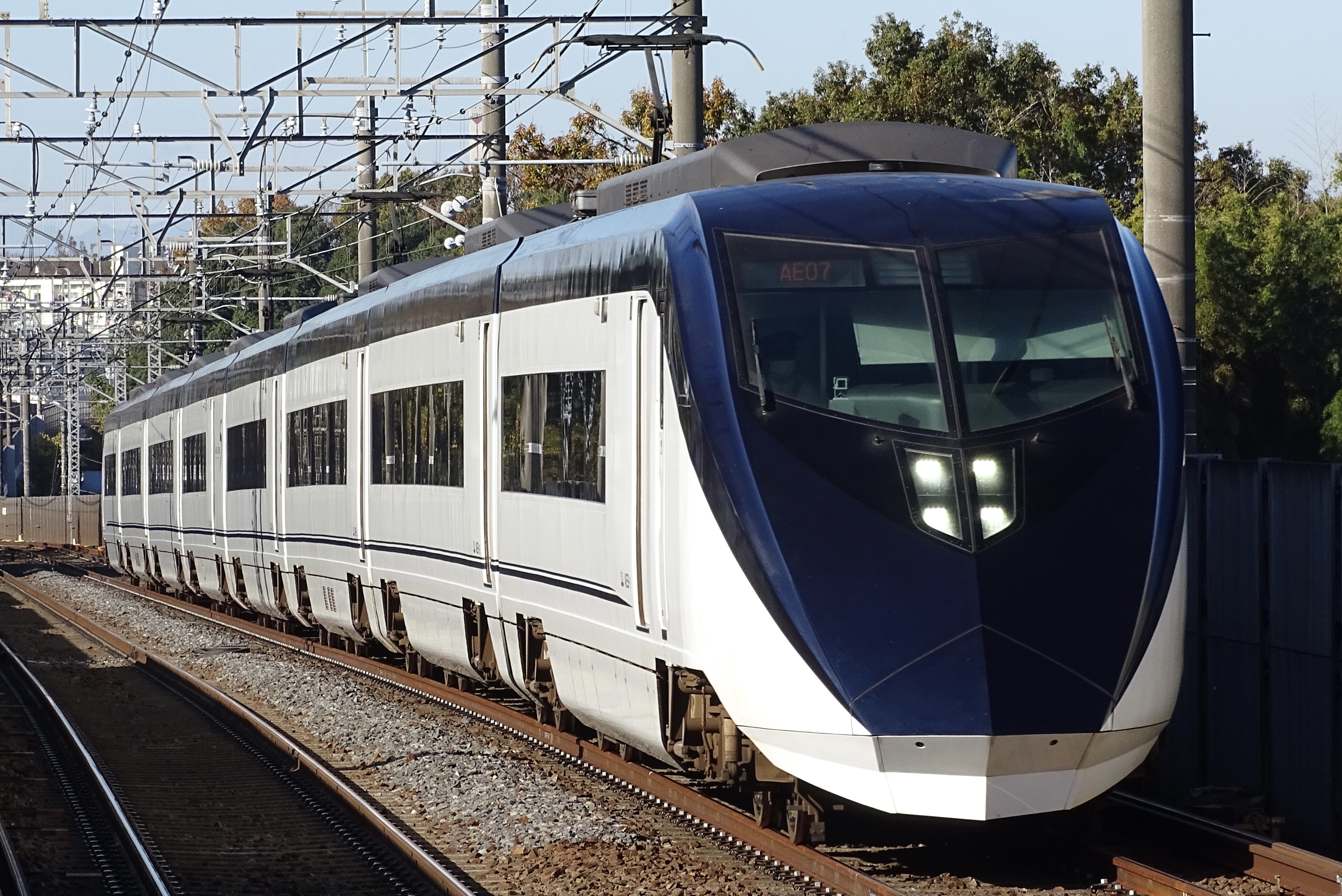
- AE series approaching Ōmachi station, 23 November 2020
- In service: 2010–
- Manufacturers: Nippon Sharyo, Tokyu Car Corporation
- Designer: Kansai Yamamoto
- Replaced: Keisei AE100 series
- Constructed: 2009–2010, 2019
- Entered service: 17 July 2010
- Number built: 72 vehicles (9 sets)
- Number in service: 72 vehicles (9 sets)
- Formation: 8 cars per trainset
- Fleet numbers: AE1–AE9
- Capacity: 398 (monoclass)
- Operator: Keisei Electric Railway
- Line served: Narita Airport

Specifications
- Car body construction: Aluminium
- Car length: 19.500 m (63 ft 11.7 in) (end cars); 19.000 m (62 ft 4.0 in) (intermediate cars)
- Width: 2.794 m (9 ft 2.0 in)
- Height: 4.030 m (13 ft 2.7 in)
- Doors: 1 per side
- Maximum speed: 160 km/h (99 mph)
- Traction system: IGBT–VVVF
- Traction motors: 24 × 175 kW (235 hp) 3-phase AC induction motor
- Power output: 4.2 MW (5,632 hp)
- Acceleration: 2.0 km/(h⋅s) (1.2 mph/s)
- Deceleration: 4.0 km/(h⋅s) (2.5 mph/s) (service); 4.5 km/(h⋅s) (2.8 mph/s) (emergency)
- Electric systems: Overhead line, 1,500 V DC
- Current collection: Pantograph
- UIC classification: Bo′Bo′+Bo′Bo′+Bo′Bo′+Bo′Bo′+2′2′+2′2′+Bo′Bo′+Bo′Bo′
- Bogies: SS170
- Track gauge: 1,435 mm (4 ft 8 1/2 in) standard gauge

Notes/references
- This train won the 54th Blue Ribbon Award in 2011.

The Keisei AE series (京成AE形) is a DC electric multiple unit (EMU) train type operated by the private railway operator Keisei Electric Railway on Skyliner limited express services to and from Narita International Airport in Japan via the Keisei Narita Airport Line. The first set was delivered in May 2009, and entered service in July 2010, replacing the Keisei AE100 series EMUs previously used on these services.

== Design ==
Each 8-car set consists of six motored cars and two trailers. The trains are the first Keisei trains to use bolsterless bogies, and the end cars are equipped with active suspension. The train design and styling was overseen by Japanese fashion designer Kansai Yamamoto. The musical horn and in-train announcement melody are provided by Casiopea keyboardist and Ongakukan CEO Minoru Mukaiya.

The AE series design won the "Good Design Award" in 2010, and in May 2011 was awarded the 2011 Blue Ribbon Award, presented annually by the Japan Railfan Club.

== Formation ==
As of 5 September 2019, the fleet consists of nine 8-car sets formed as shown below with car 1 at the Narita end.

Car No.	1	2	3	4	5	6	7	8
Designation	M2c	M1	M2N	M1'	T2	T1	M2s	M1c
Numbering	x-1	x-2	x-3	x-4	x-5	x-6	x-7	x-8

- Cars 2, 4, 6, and 8 are each fitted with a single-arm pantograph.
- The "x" in the individual car numbering corresponds to the set number (1 to 9).

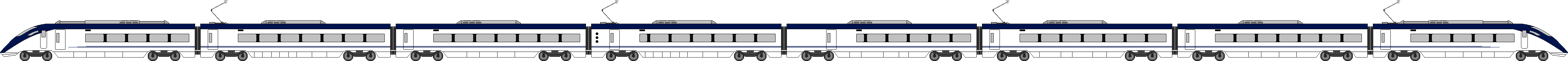
Diagram

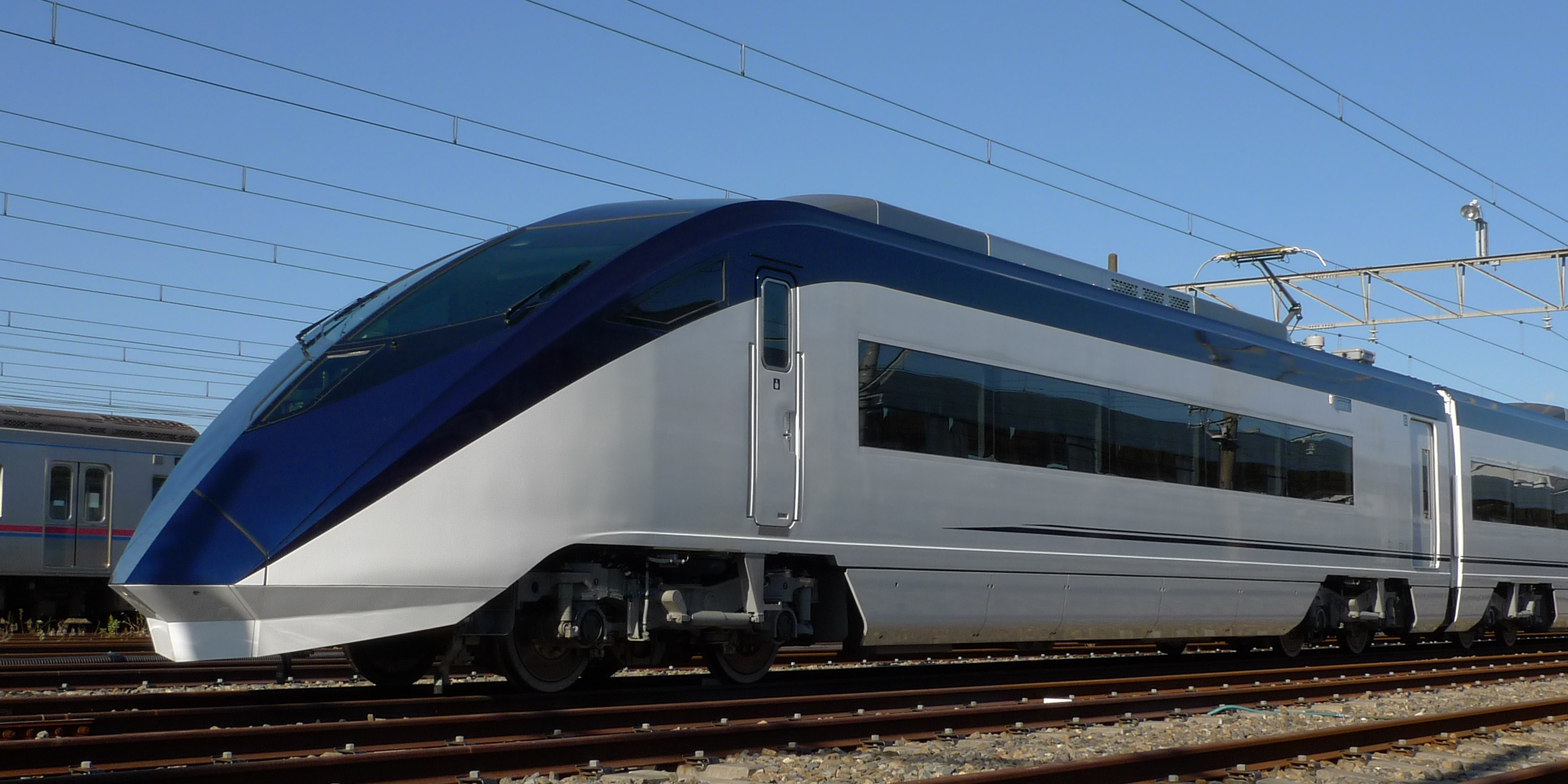
Car 8

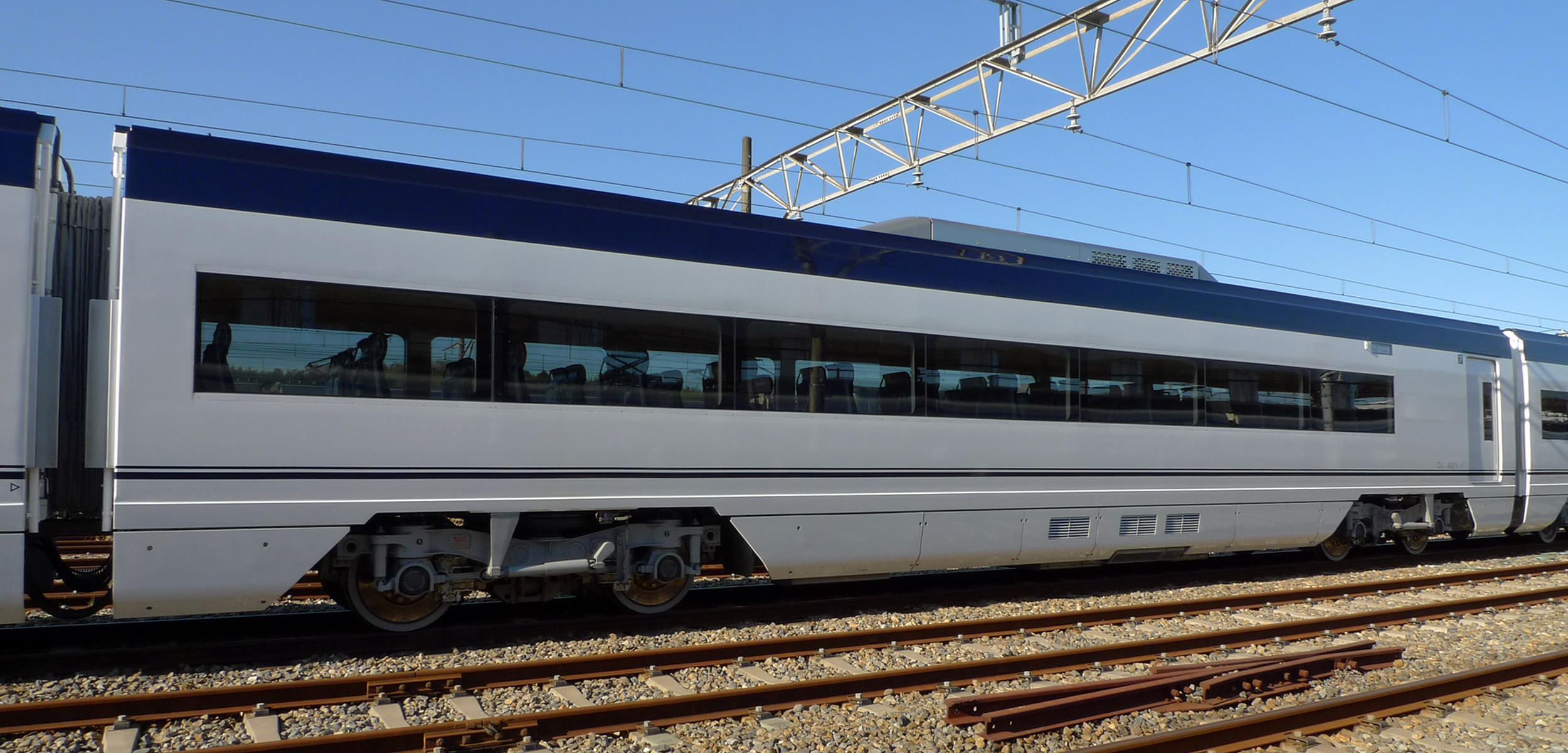
Car 7

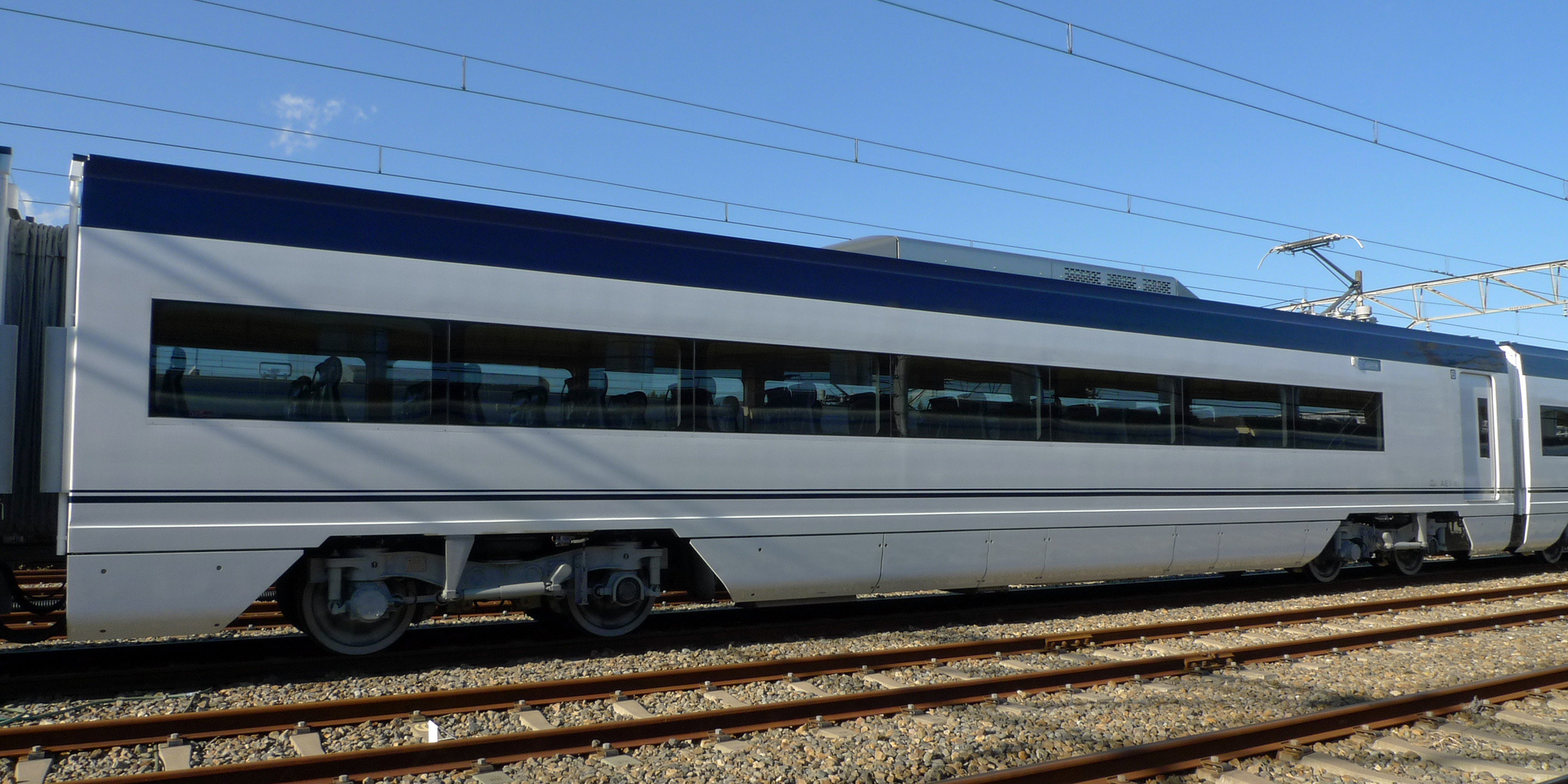
Car 6

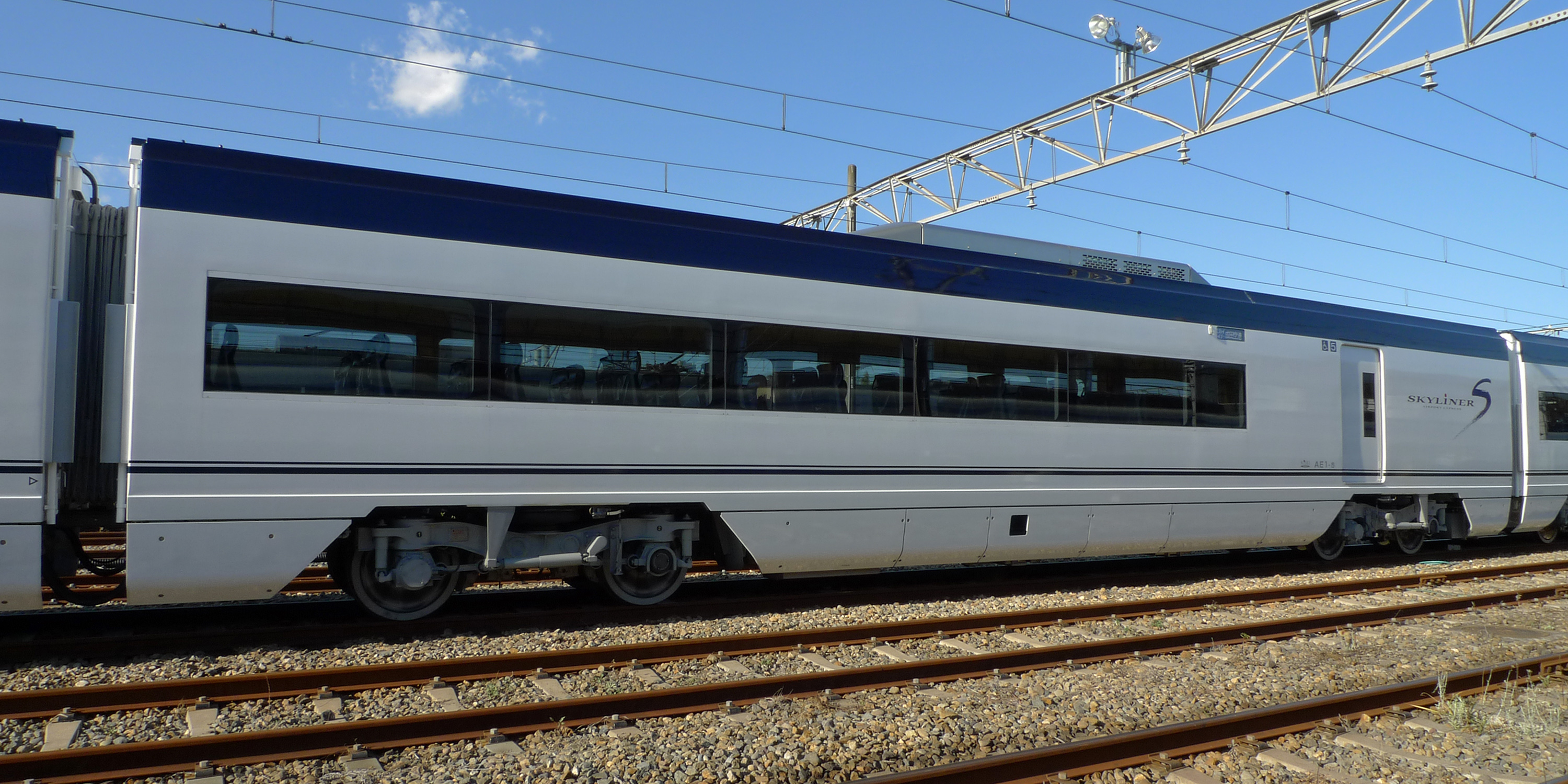
Car 5

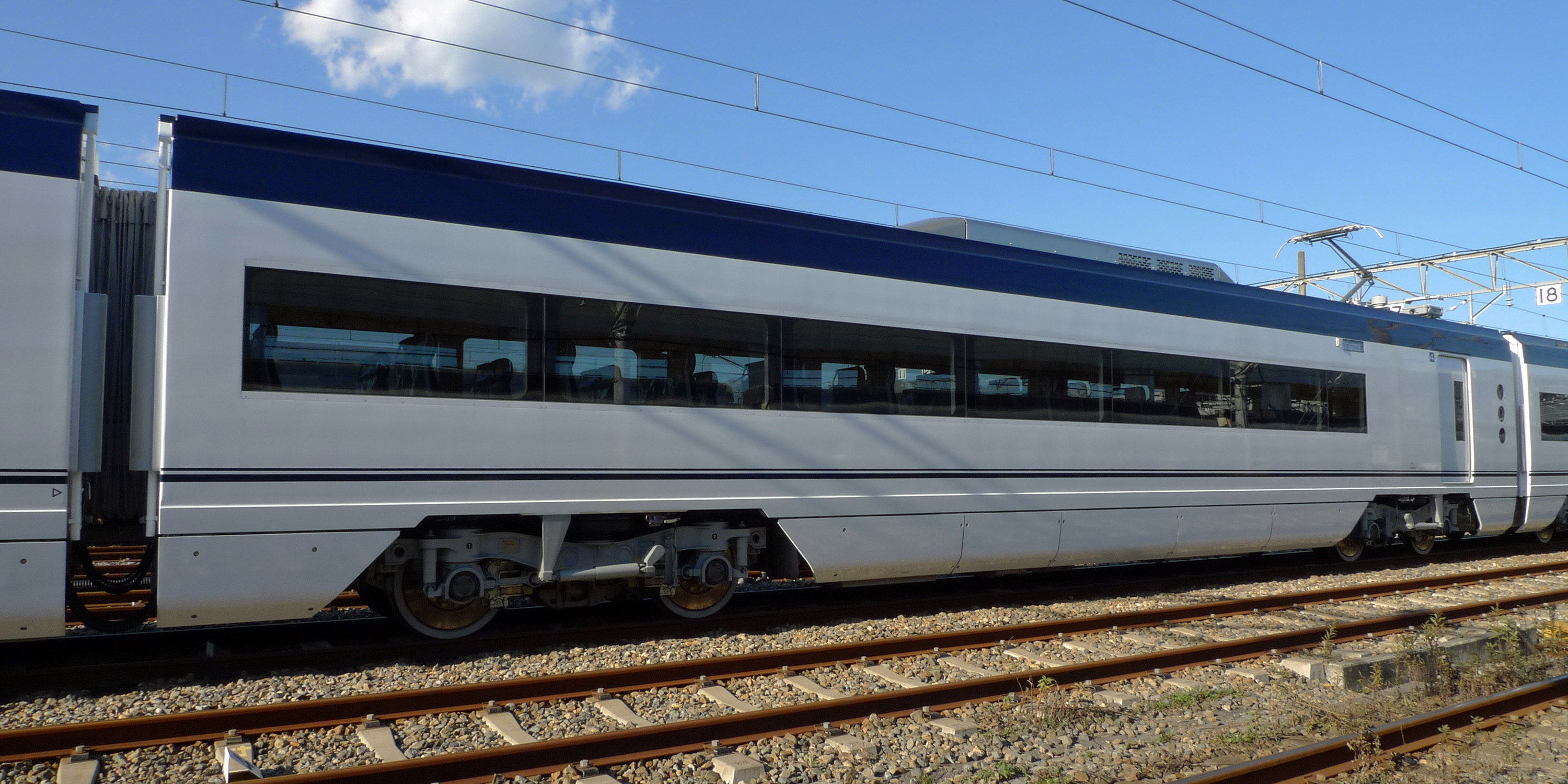
Car 4

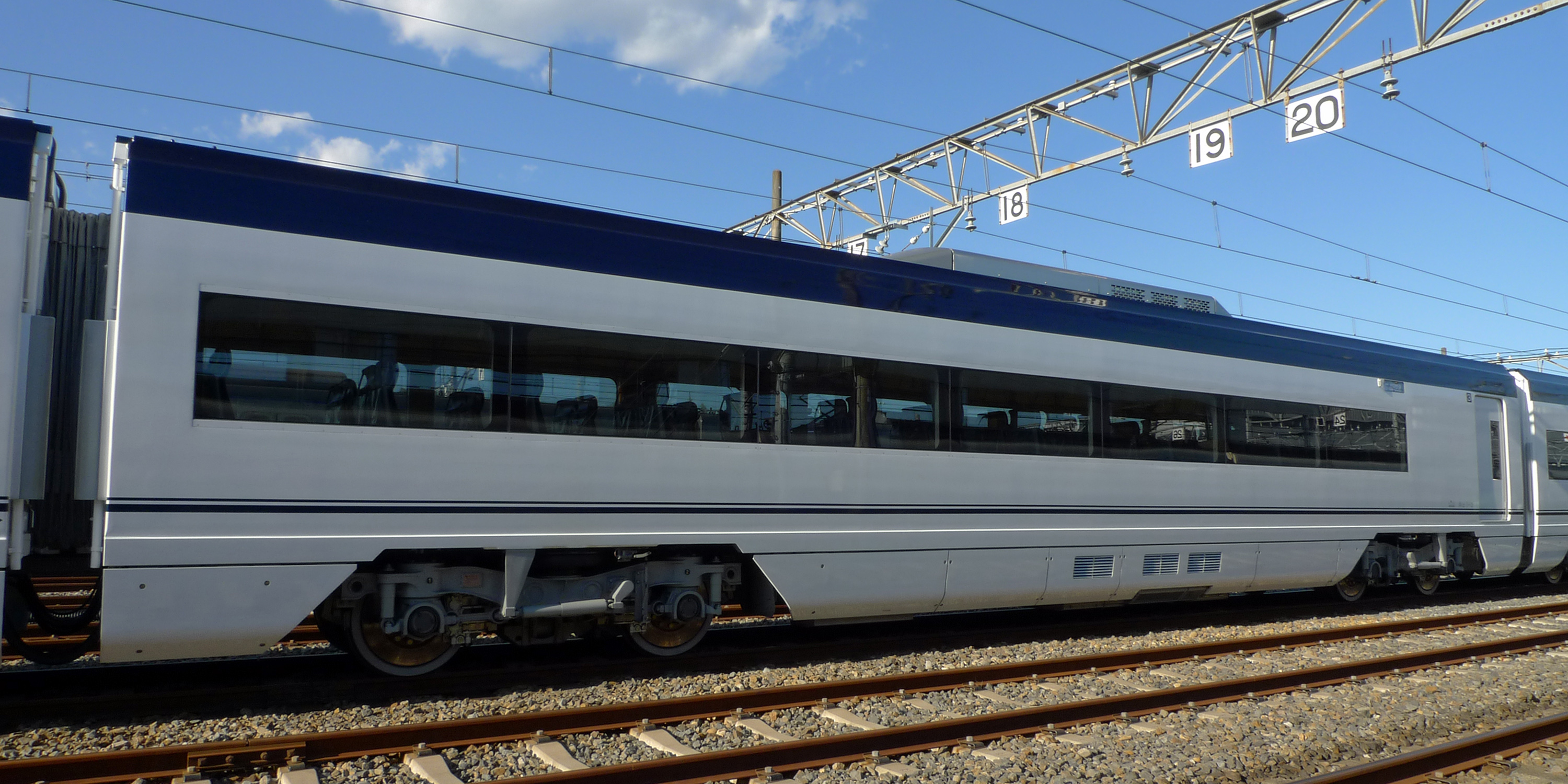
Car 3

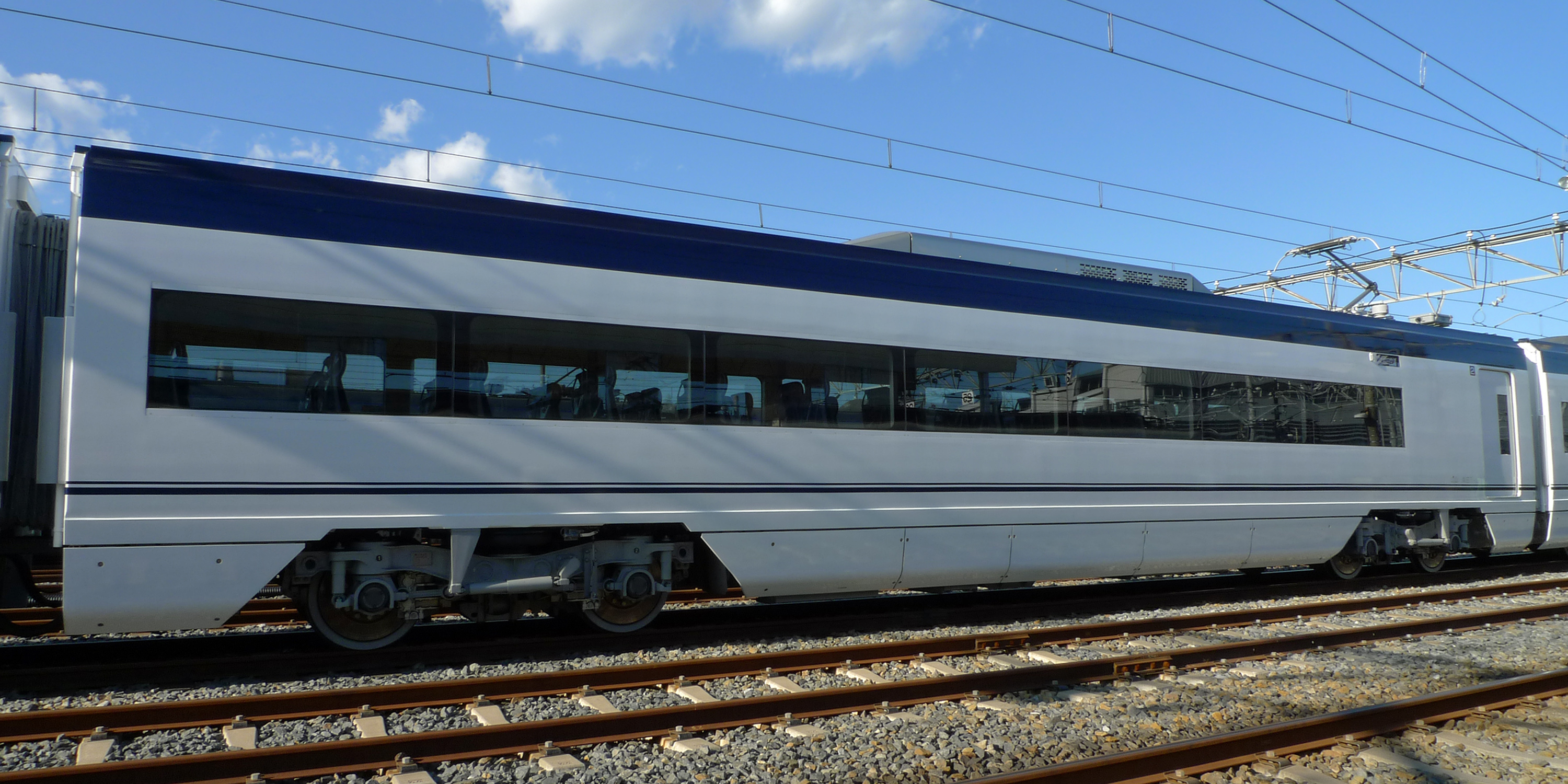
Car 2

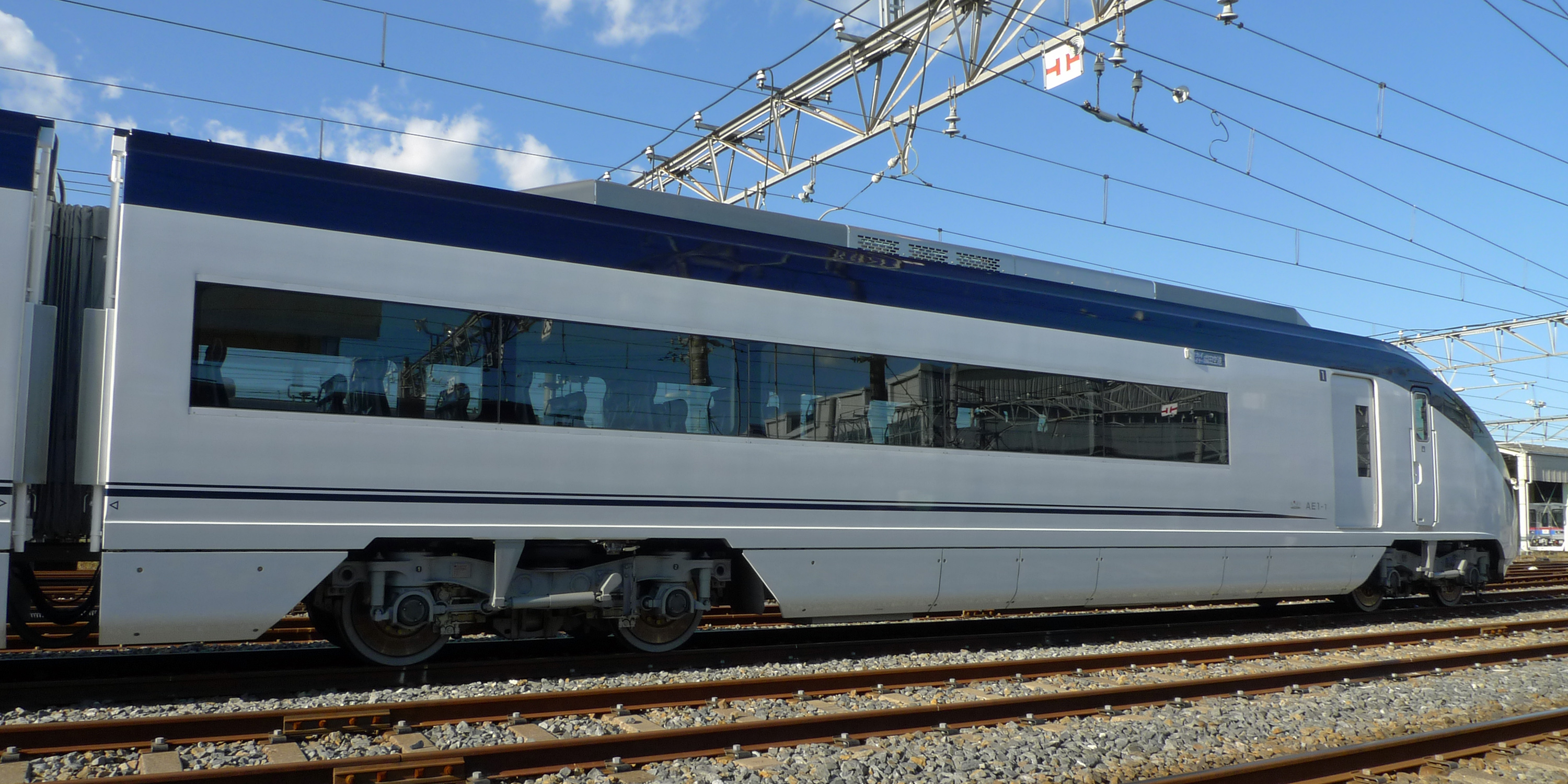
Car 1

== Interior ==
All cars are monoclass, with 2+2 abreast rotating/reclining seating. Car 4 has a drink vending machine. Car 5 is equipped with a universal access toilet and also a wheelchair space.

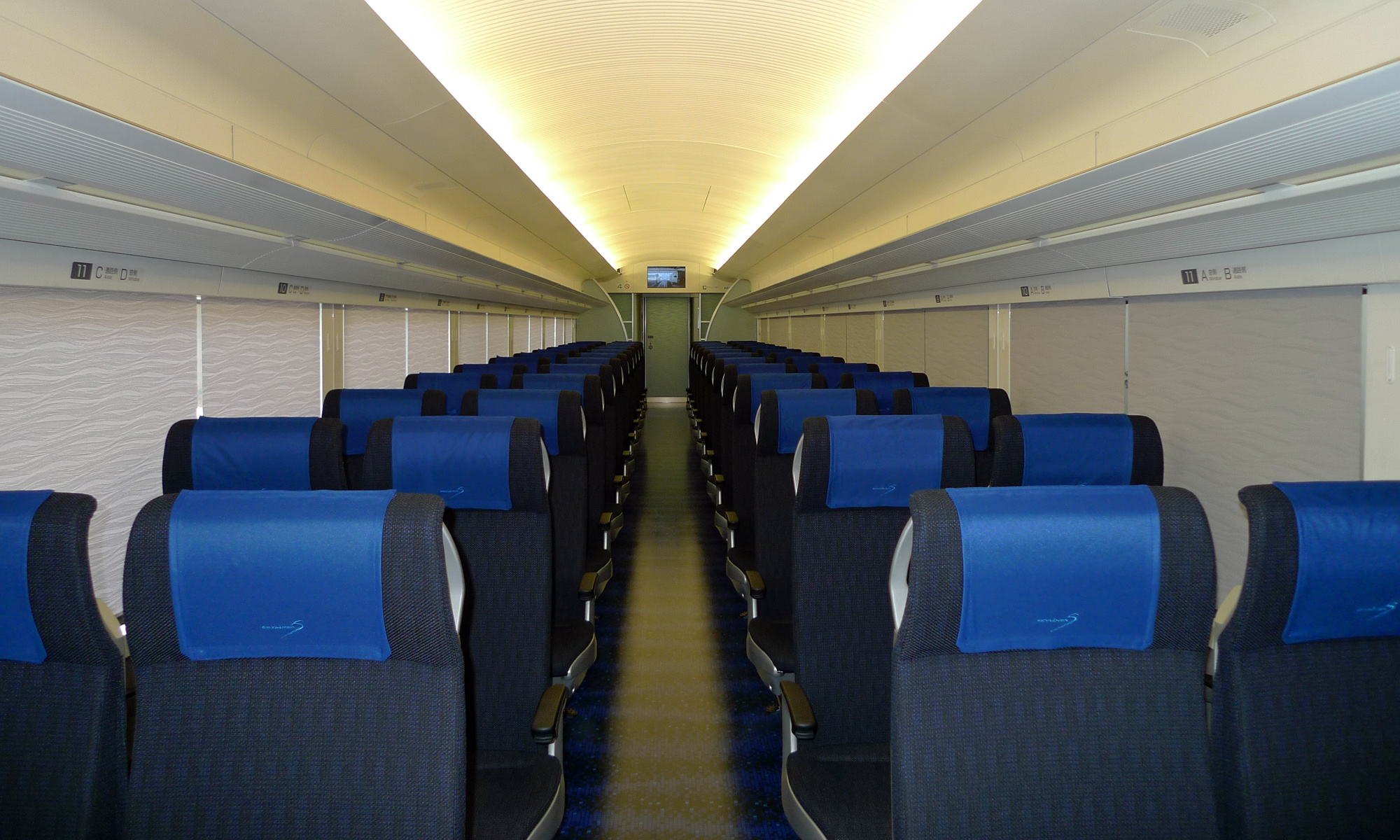
General interior view, July 2010

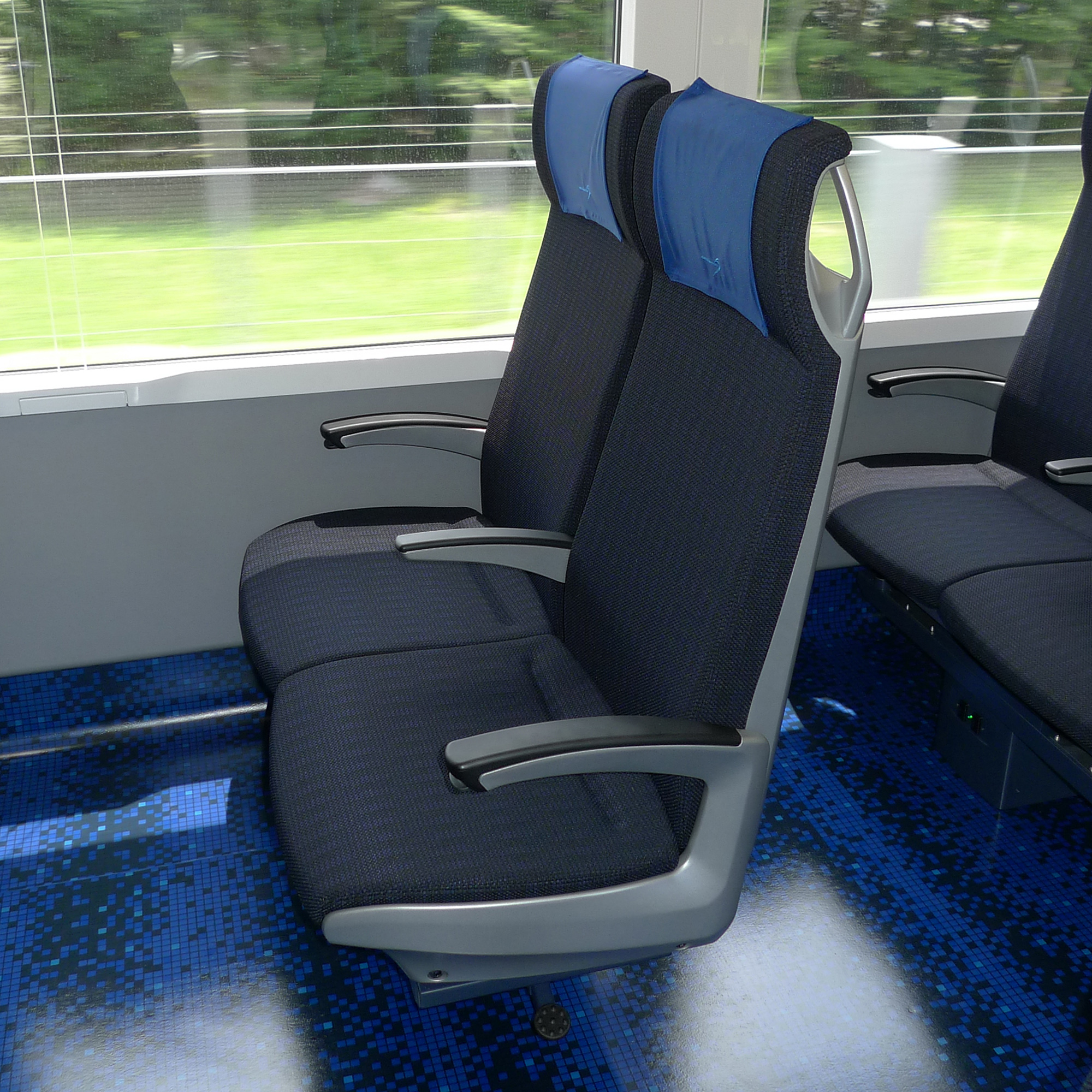
Seat detail, July 2010

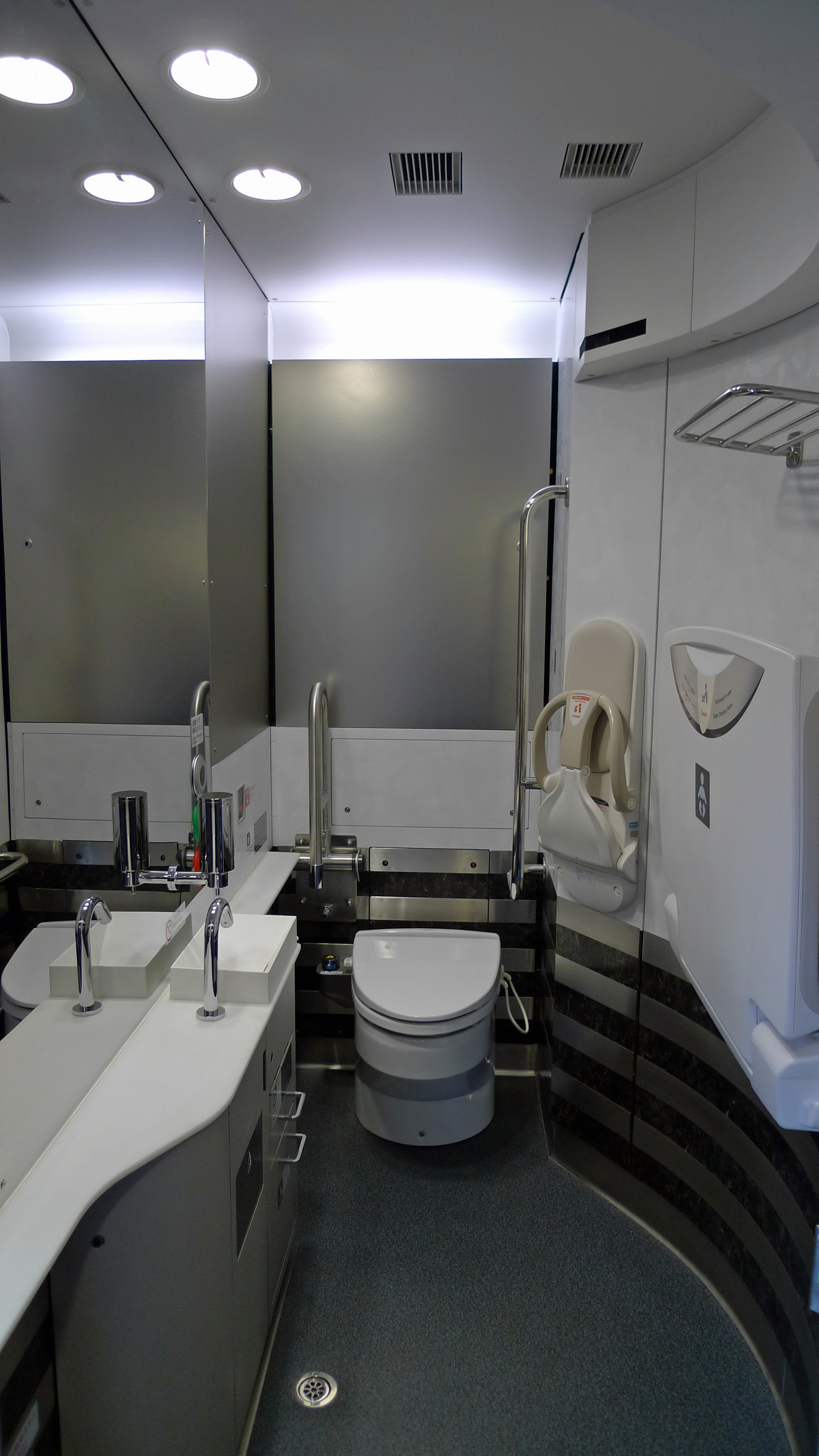
Universal access toilet, July 2010

== History ==
The AE series entered revenue service on Skyliner services from 17 July 2010.

== Build details ==
The manufacturers and delivery dates for the fleet are as shown below.

Set No.	Manufacturer	Date delivered
1	Nippon Sharyo	27 August 2009
2	Tokyu Car	19 March 2010
3	Nippon Sharyo	26 March 2010
4	Tokyu Car	26 March 2010
5	Nippon Sharyo	1 July 2010
6	Tokyu Car	14 May 2010
7	Nippon Sharyo	6 July 2010
8	Tokyu Car	8 July 2010
9	Nippon Sharyo	5 September 2019

== See also ==
- E259 series, trains used on competing JR East Narita Express services
