= Keisei AE series (1972) =

Japanese train type

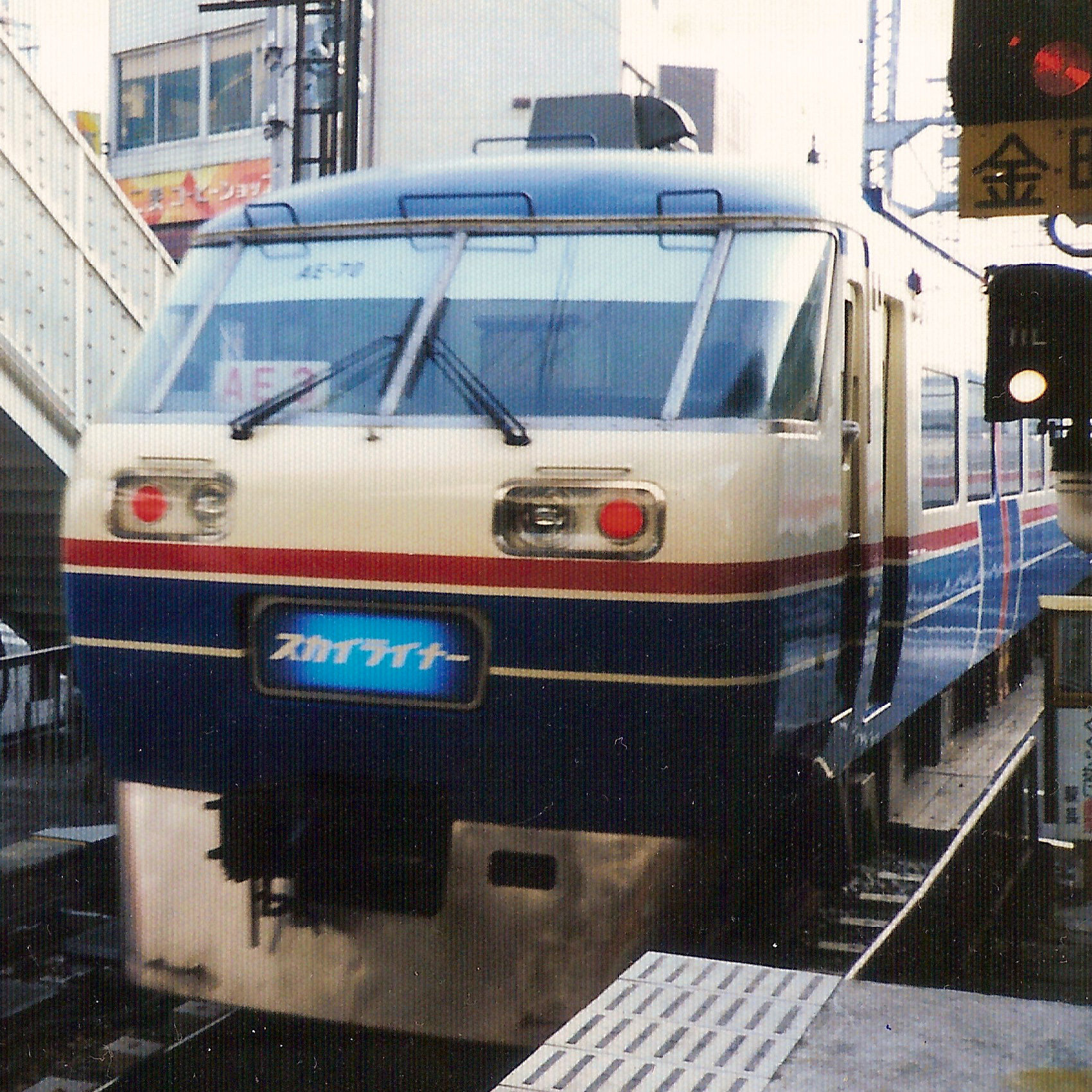
- A Keisei AE series train in revised livery in the early 1990s
- In service: 1973–1993
- Manufacturer: Nippon Sharyo, Tokyu Car Corporation
- Constructed: 1972–1978
- Entered service: 30 December 1973
- Number built: 43 vehicles (7 sets)
- Number in service: None
- Number preserved: 1 vehicle
- Number scrapped: 42 vehicles (1 due to fire damage)
- Formation: 8 (originally 6) cars per trainset
- Operators: Keisei Electric Railway

Specifications
- Car body construction: Steel
- Doors: 1 per side
- Maximum speed: 105 km/h (65 mph)
- Traction system: Chopper control
- Electric system(s): 1,500 V DC
- Current collector(s): overhead
- Track gauge: 1,435 mm (4 ft 8 1/2 in)

Notes/references
- This train won the 17th Blue Ribbon Award in 1974.

The Keisei AE series (京成AE形) was a DC electric multiple unit (EMU) train type operated by the private railway operator Keisei Electric Railway on Skyliner limited express services to and from Narita International Airport in Japan. The "AE" stood for "Airport Express". First delivered in 1972, the trains operated between 1973 and 1993, and were replaced by Keisei AE100 series EMUs.

== History ==
Five six-car sets were delivered in March 1972, entering service from December 1973 on reserved-seat limited express services between Keisei Ueno in Tokyo and Keisei Narita before the opening of the nearby Narita Airport. The new Skyliner services started on 21 May 1978, serving the original Narita Airport Station (present-day Higashi-Narita Station), and a further two six-car AE series sets were delivered in time for the start of these services. The sets were lengthened from six to eight cars from July 1990 ahead of the start of services to the new Narita Airport Station directly beneath the airport complex in March 1991. Lengthening the sets involved rebuilding some of the original driving cars as intermediate cars, forming a fleet of five eight-car sets from seven six-car sets, with two surplus cars being scrapped. The AE series sets were gradually phased out from June 1990 with the introduction of new AE100 series sets, and a final "sayonara" working ran on 27 June 1993.

Following the withdrawal of the fleet, the bogies and control equipment were re-used with new bodies to form a fleet of five eight-car 3400 series commuter EMUs.

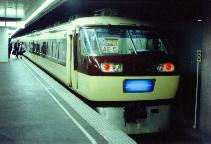
A Keisei AE series train in original livery in January 1985

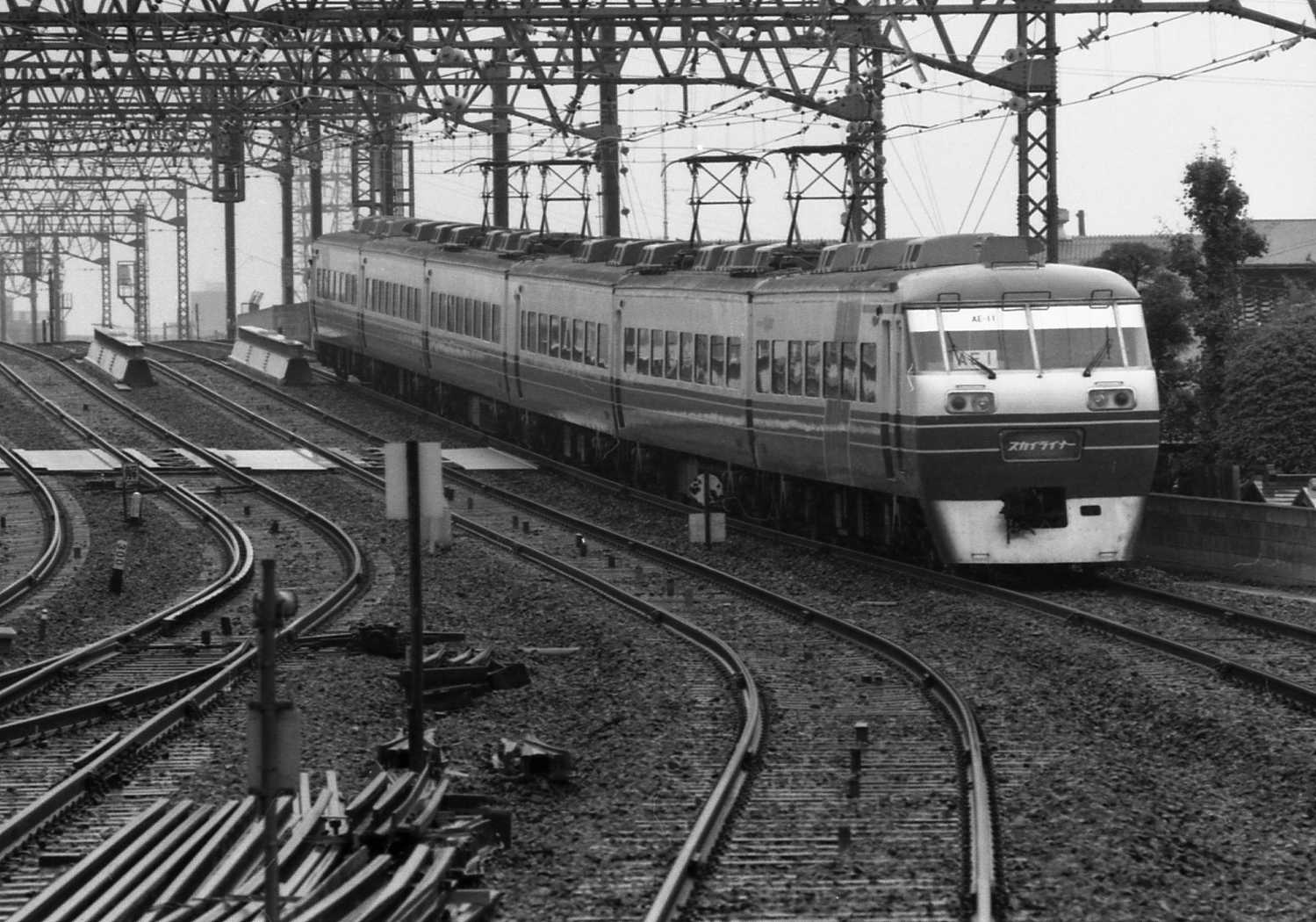
An AE series set in service in 1989

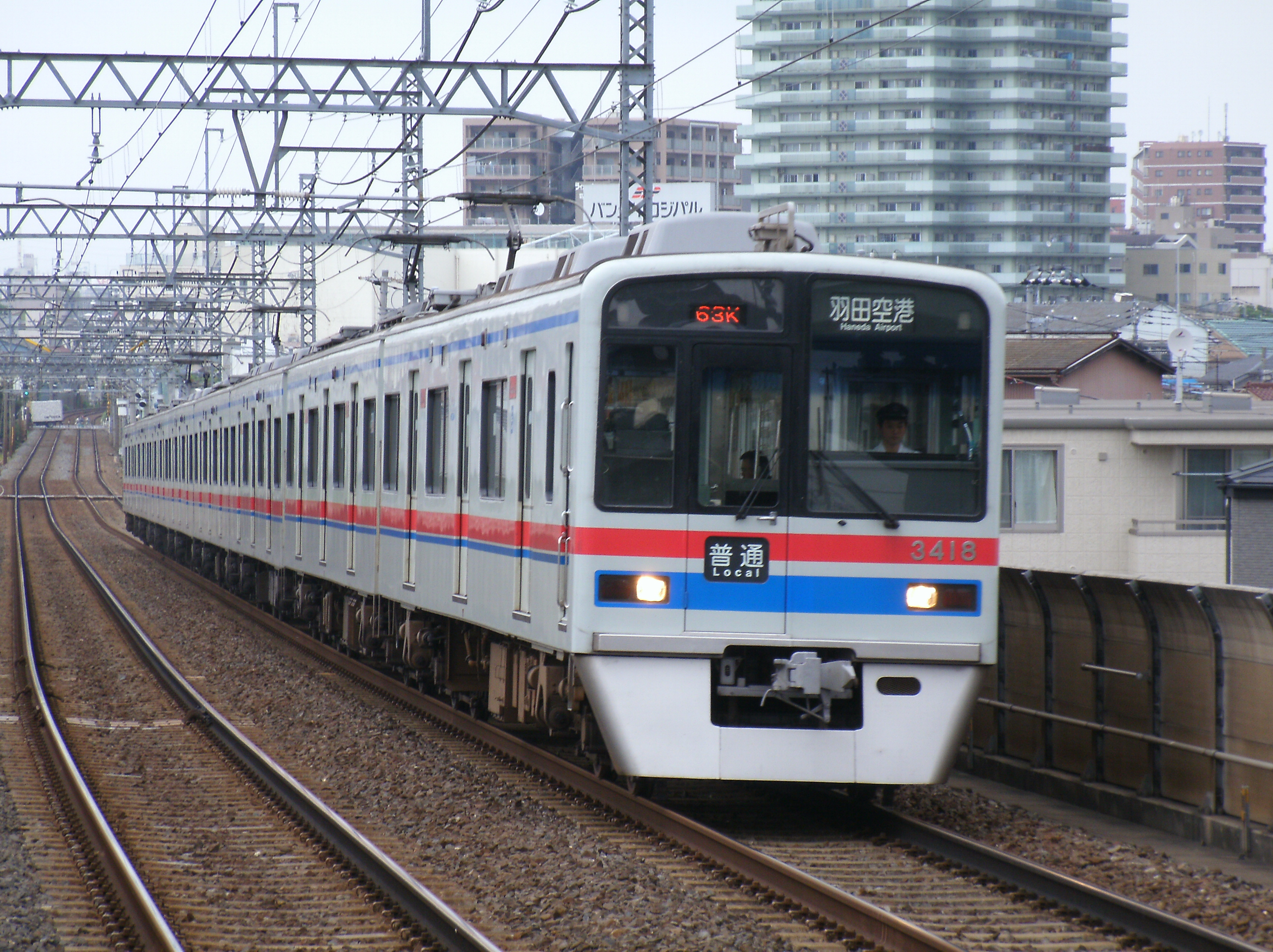
A Keisei 3400 series EMU in July 2010

=== Fire damage ===
Car AE29 (car 2) of set AE30 was scrapped due to fire damage sustained in an arson attack to depend on this Revolutionary Communist League, National Committee occurring on 5 May 1978.

== Preserved examples ==
One car, AE61, is preserved at Sogo Depot in Shisui, Chiba Prefecture.

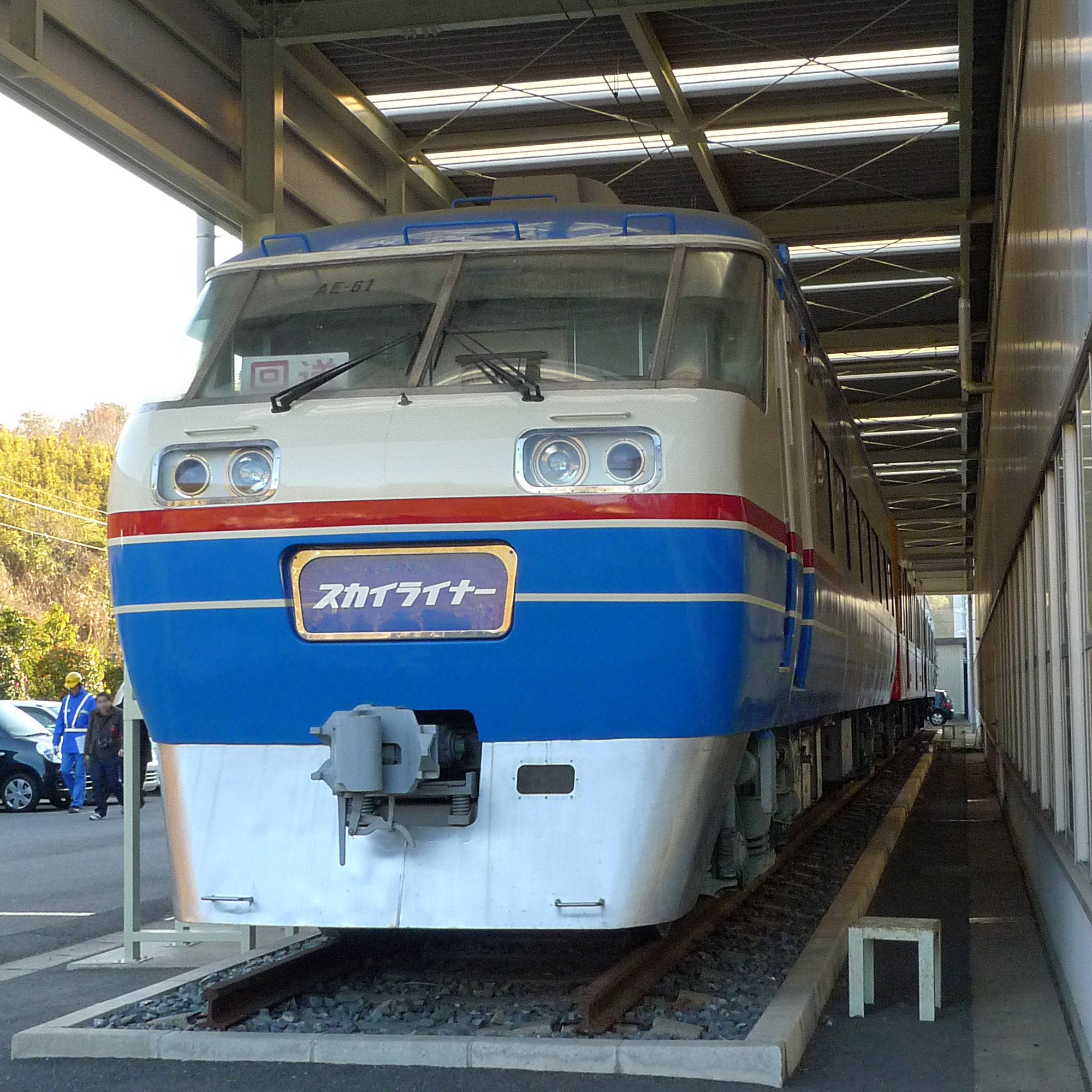
Preserved AE series car AE61 at Sogo Depot in December 2009

== See also ==
- Narita Express
