= Keisei Narita Airport Line =

Railway line in Tokyo & Chiba prefectures, Japan

Narita Airport Line

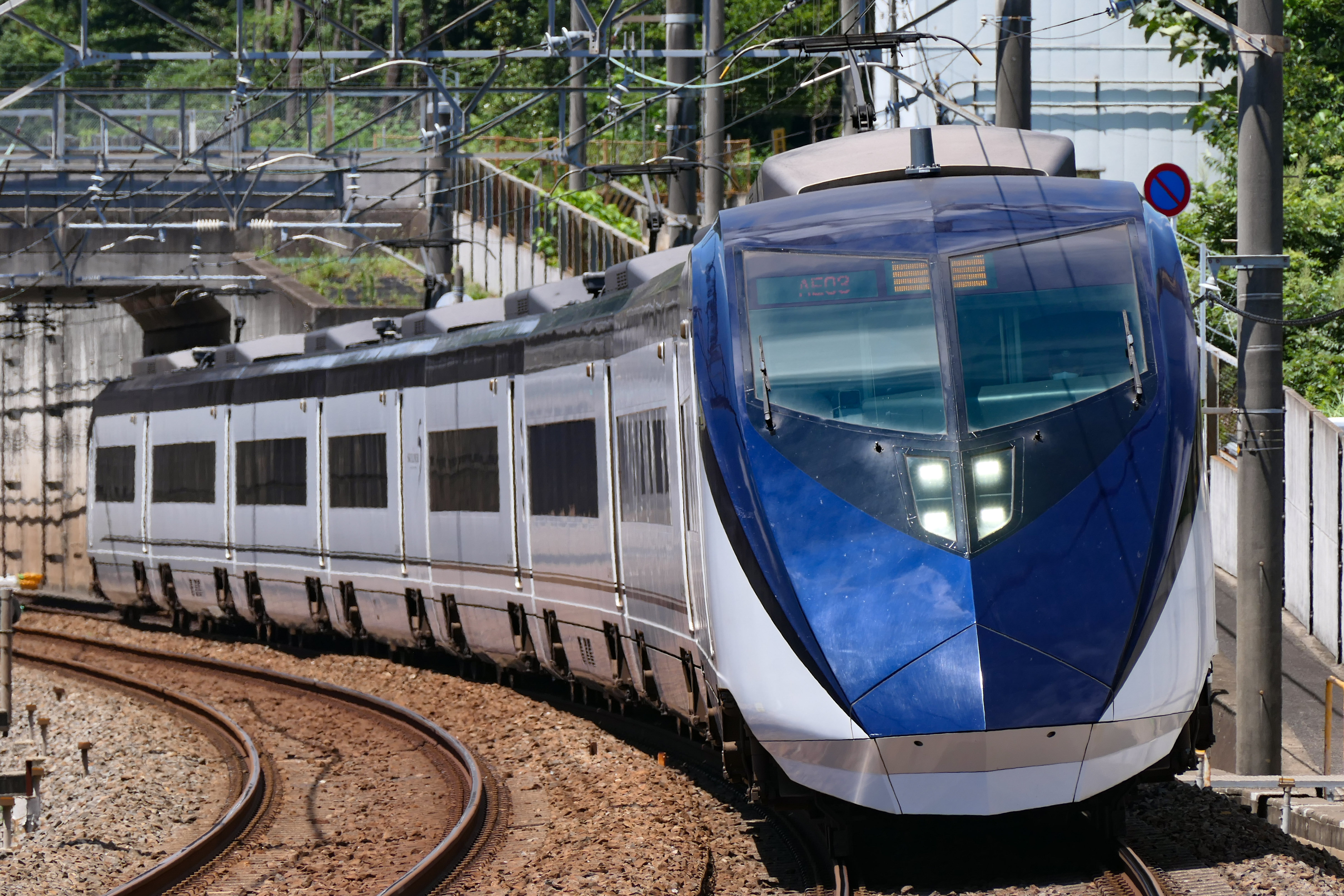
- Keisei Skyliner Limited Express

Overview
- Other name: Narita Sky Access Line (成田スカイアクセス線)
- Native name: 成田空港線
- Owner: Various (see table)
- Locale: Tokyo, Chiba prefectures
- Termini: Keisei Takasago; Narita Airport Terminal 1
- Stations: 8

Service
- Type: Higher-speed rail/Airport rail link
- Operator: Keisei Electric Railway
- Rolling stock: Keisei 3000, 3050, 3100, 3700 and AE series; Keikyu 600 and N1000 series; Toei 5500 series

History
- Opened: 17 July 2010; 16 years ago

Technical
- Line length: 51.4 km (31.9 mi)
- Track gauge: 1,435 mm (4 ft 8 1/2 in) standard gauge
- Electrification: Overhead line, 1,500 V DC
- Operating speed: 160 km/h (99 mph)
- Signalling: Automatic closed block
- Train protection system: C-ATS

The Narita Airport Line (Japanese: 成田空港線, Hepburn: Narita Kūkō-sen) is a Japanese railway line connecting Keisei Takasago Station and Narita Airport Terminal 1 Station, operated by Keisei Electric Railway. The entire route from Keisei Ueno Station, including the Keisei Main Line as far as Keisei Takasago, is branded Narita Sky Access (成田スカイアクセス, Narita Sukai Akusesu).

The Keisei Electric Railway operates over the entire line, while other companies, such as Hokuso Railway, operate over certain sections of it. The new line is used by Skyliner limited express services, operating at up to 160 km/h (100 mph) using Keisei AE series EMUs. Skyliner is the fastest and most expensive service (with reserved seating and luggage racks), followed by the Sky Access (which has space for luggage), and then the Keisei Limited Express (regular commuter train).

== Operations ==
Trains utilize the Keisei Electric Railway's Main Line between Keisei Ueno and Keisei-Takasago. Trains run at a maximum speed of 160 km/h (100 mph), thus completing the run from Nippori to Narita Airport Terminal 2·3 in a minimum of 36 minutes (15 minutes faster than the previous Skyliner route, which took 51 minutes). The reserved-seat Keisei Skyliner limited express fare for the route between Narita airport and either Nippori or Ueno stations is ¥2,580 and takes 36–41 minutes, while the Access Express commuter fast train costs ¥1,280 and takes 63–69 minutes. Express trains also operate towards Haneda Airport from Narita Airport (in a long chain of through service via Keisei-Takasago, Aoto, Oshiage, Sengakuji/Shinagawa, and Keikyū-Kamata), connecting the two airports in 92–109 minutes for a fare of ¥1,850.

== Potential extension ==
The City Center Direct Link Line project proposes building a spur from the Toei Asakusa Line to Tōkyō Station, opening a potentially faster route to the airport via Keisei Oshiage Line. However, the Tokyo Metropolitan Government has not been supportive of the plan, and in 2015 it was deprioritized in favor of alternatives like the Haneda Airport Access Line.

== Basic data ==
- Total length: 51.4 km (31.9 mi)
- Service operators and track owners: (Note: Descriptions of the various categories are available at Rail transport in Japan.)

Station	Keisei-Takasago	Komuro	Inba-Nihon-Idai	(Tsuchiya)	Narita Airport Terminal 2·3	Narita Airport Terminal 1
Operating carrier	Keisei Electric Railway (Cat. 2)					
Operating carrier	Hokusō Railway (Cat. 1)		Hokusō Railway (Cat. 2)		East Japan Railway Company (JR East) (Cat. 2)	
Owner	Hokusō Railway (Cat. 1)		Chiba New Town Railway (Cat. 3)	Narita Rapid Rail Access (Cat. 3)	Narita Airport Rapid Railway (Cat. 3)	
Tracks	Existing			Newly constructed	Existing	

== Station list ==
Trains stop at stations marked "●" and pass those marked "｜". Some Skyliner trains stop at stations marked "▲".

No.	Station	Access Express	Skyliner	Transfers	Location	
↑ Through-running via the Main Line and Oshiage Line to/from ↑: Keisei Ueno via the Main Line; Nishi-Magome via the Asakusa Line; Yokohama via the Asakusa Line and Main Line, and Misakiguchi via the Kurihama Line; To/from Haneda Airport via the Asakusa Line, Main Line, and Airport Line
KS10	Keisei-Takasago 京成高砂	●	｜	Main Line (through service); Kanamachi Line; Hokusō Line	Katsushika, Tokyo	
HS05	Higashi-Matsudo 東松戸	●	｜	Hokusō Line; Musashino Line (JM13)	Matsudo	Chiba
HS08	Shin-Kamagaya 新鎌ヶ谷	●	▲	Hokusō Line; Matsudo Line (KS78); Tōbu Urban Park Line (TD30)	Kamagaya	Chiba
HS12	Chiba New Town Chūō 千葉ニュータウン中央	●	｜	Hokusō Line	Inzai	Chiba
HS14	Imba Nihon-idai 印旛日本医大	●	｜	Hokusō Line	Inzai	Chiba
KS43	Narita Yukawa 成田湯川	●	｜		Narita	Chiba
KS41	Narita Airport Terminal 2·3 空港第2ビル	●	●	Main Line; Narita Line (Airport branch, JO36)	Narita	Chiba
KS42	Narita Airport Terminal 1 成田空港	●	●	Main Line; Narita Line (Airport branch, JO37)	Narita	Chiba

== History ==
The Keisei Narita Airport Line in relation to existing tracks

Service on this line commenced on July 17, 2010. The line involved the refurbishment of 32.3 km (20.1 mi) of existing track on the Hokusō Line, as well as the construction of 19.1 km (11.9 mi) of new dual track to Narita Airport, partly using disused rights-of-way originally planned for the cancelled Narita Shinkansen project. The total cost was estimated to be ¥126 billion, or about US$1.3 billion. From the timetable revision on February 26, 2022, Toei 5500 series trains began operating on the line on weekdays.

In October 2022, Keisei announced that certain Skyliner trains would begin serving Shin-Kamagaya Station with the intent of improving access to Kashiwa and Matsudo in Chiba Prefecture. The planned implementation took place on 26 November 2022.
