= Narita Airport Terminal 1 Station =

Railway station in Narita, Chiba Prefecture, Japan

Coordinates: 35°45′57″N 140°23′11″E

JO37 KS42 Narita Airport Terminal 1 Station 成田空港(成田第1ターミナル)駅
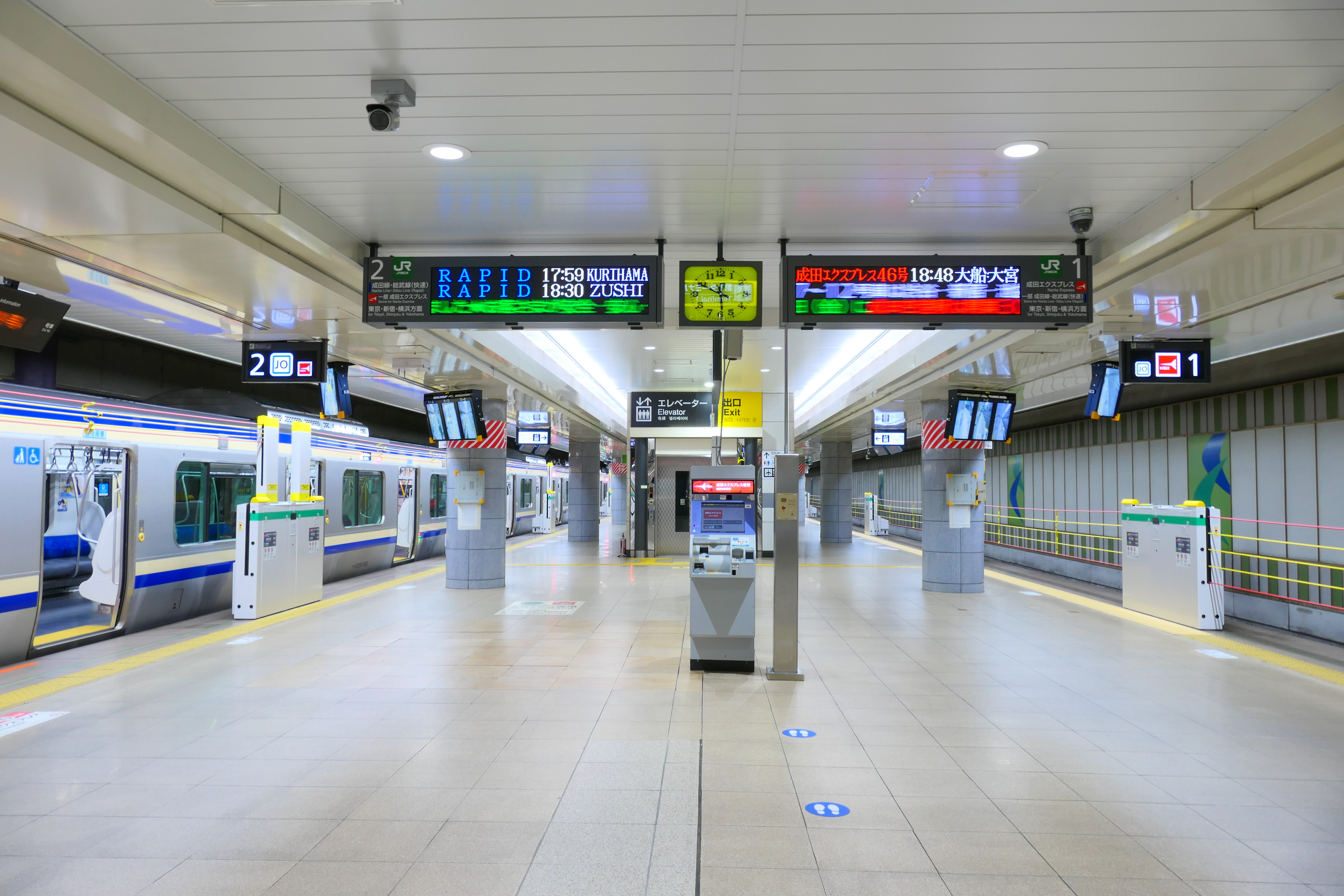
- The JR East platforms at Narita Airport Terminal 1 Station in 23 March 2021

General information
- Other names: Narita Airport Station (until 1992)
- Location: 1-1 Goryō-bokujō, Sanrizuka, Narita-shi, Chiba-ken; Japan
- Operator: JR East; Keisei Electric Railway
- Lines: Airport Line; Keisei Main Line; Narita Sky Access Line
- Connections: Bus terminal; Narita International Airport

Other information
- Station code: KS42 (Keisei); JO37 (JR East)

History
- Opened: 19 March 1991

Passengers
- FY2009: 5,546 (JR); 20,386 (Keisei) daily
Services
Preceding station	JR East	Following station
Narita Airport Terminal 2·3 JO36 towards Shinjuku or Ōfuna	Narita Express	Terminus
Narita Airport Terminal 2·3 JO36 towards Chiba	Narita Line Airport branch Rapid Local	Terminus
Preceding station	Keisei	Following station
Narita Airport Terminal 2·3 KS41 towards Keisei Ueno	Skyliner	Terminus
Narita Airport Terminal 2·3 KS41 towards Keisei-Takasago	Narita Sky Access Line Access Express	Terminus
Narita Airport Terminal 2·3 KS41 towards Keisei Ueno	Morningliner; Eveningliner	Terminus
Narita Airport Terminal 2·3 KS41 towards Keisei Ueno	Main Line Rapid Limited Express Limited Express Commuter Express Rapid Local	Terminus
Location
- Location within Chiba Prefecture Location within Japan

Narita Airport Terminal 1 Station (Japanese: 成田空港(成田第1ターミナル)駅, Hepburn: Narita Kūkō (Narita daiichi tāminaru)-eki) is an underground airport rail link station located beneath Terminal 1 of Narita International Airport in Narita, Chiba, Japan. The station is shared between East Japan Railway Company (JR East) and the private railway operator Keisei Electric Railway.

== Station layout ==
The JR East portion of the station has one island platform. The Keisei portion of the station has two island platforms: one serves one track (No. 1) and the other serves two. Each of the two tracks of the latter has two positions for trains, which are separately numbered (one is numbered 2 and 4, and the other is 3 and 5). On 17 July 2010, the Keisei Line platforms and concourses were segregated: one portion is for Narita Sky Access Line trains (including Skyliner limited express services) and the other portion for Keisei Main Line trains. Passengers traveling only on the Keisei Main Line must pass through an additional ticket barrier prior to entering the platforms, so as to enforce the separate fare structure that will be in place for Narita Sky Access Line trains.

=== JR East ===
1	■ Narita Line	Limited Express Narita Express for Tokyo, Shinjuku, Omiya, and Yokohama
2	■ Narita Line	for Narita, Chiba, Tokyo, Yokohama, and Kurihama (via Sobu Line (Rapid) and Yokosuka Line)

The station has a Midori no Madoguchi staffed ticket office.

=== Keisei Electric Railway ===
1	Narita Sky Access Line	Access Express trains for Hokuso Line, Nippori, Keisei Ueno, and Oshiage; Toei Asakusa Line for Asakusa, Nihombashi, and Shimbashi; Keikyū Line for Shinagawa and Haneda Airport (International Terminal and Domestic Terminal)
2, 3	Keisei Main Line	for Keisei Narita, Keisei Funabashi, Nippori, Keisei Ueno, and Oshiage; Toei Asakusa Line for Asakusa, Nihombashi, and Shimbashi; Keikyū Line for Shinagawa and Haneda Airport
4, 5	Narita Sky Access Line	Airport Limited Express Skyliner for Nippori and Keisei Ueno

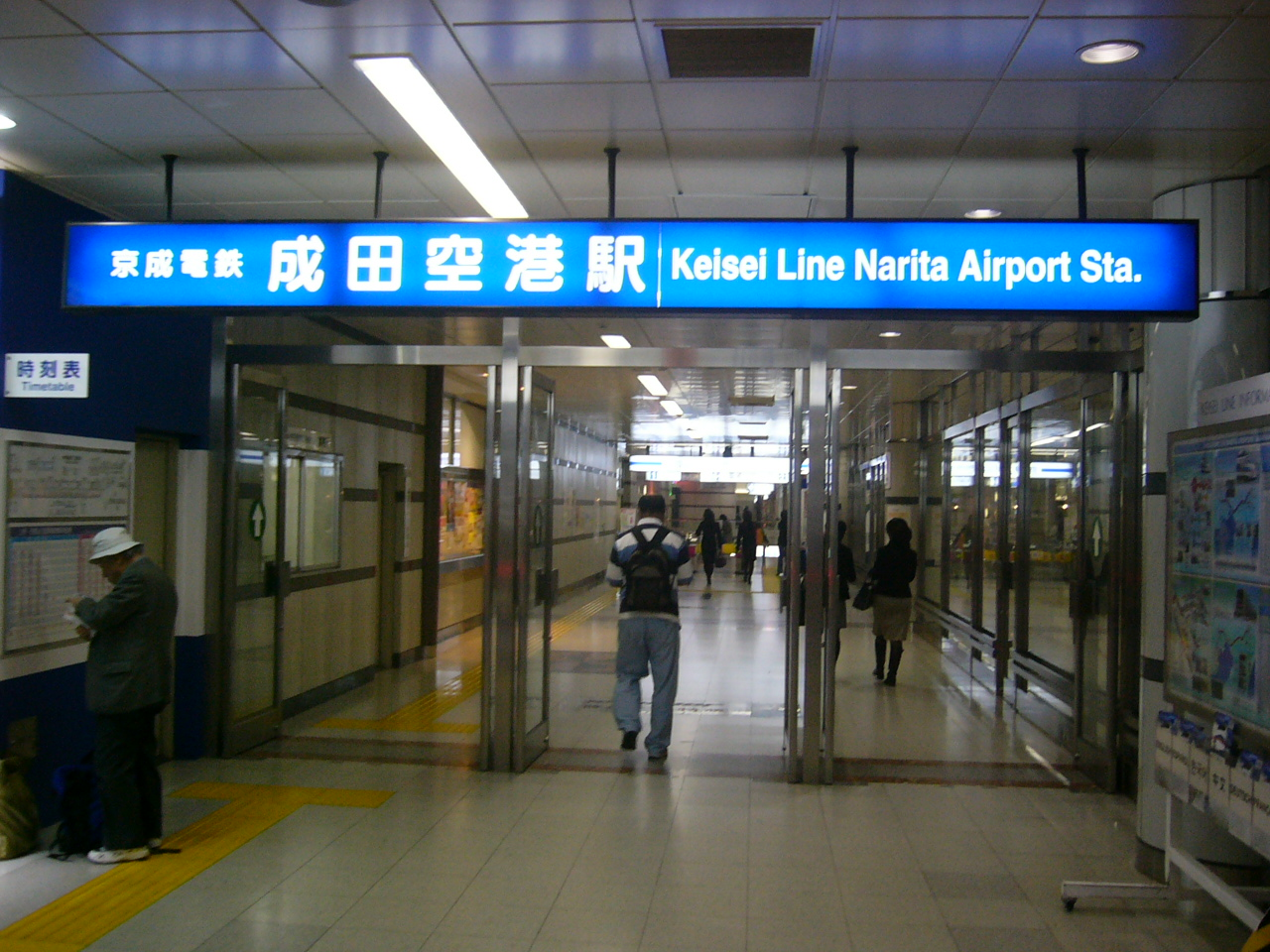
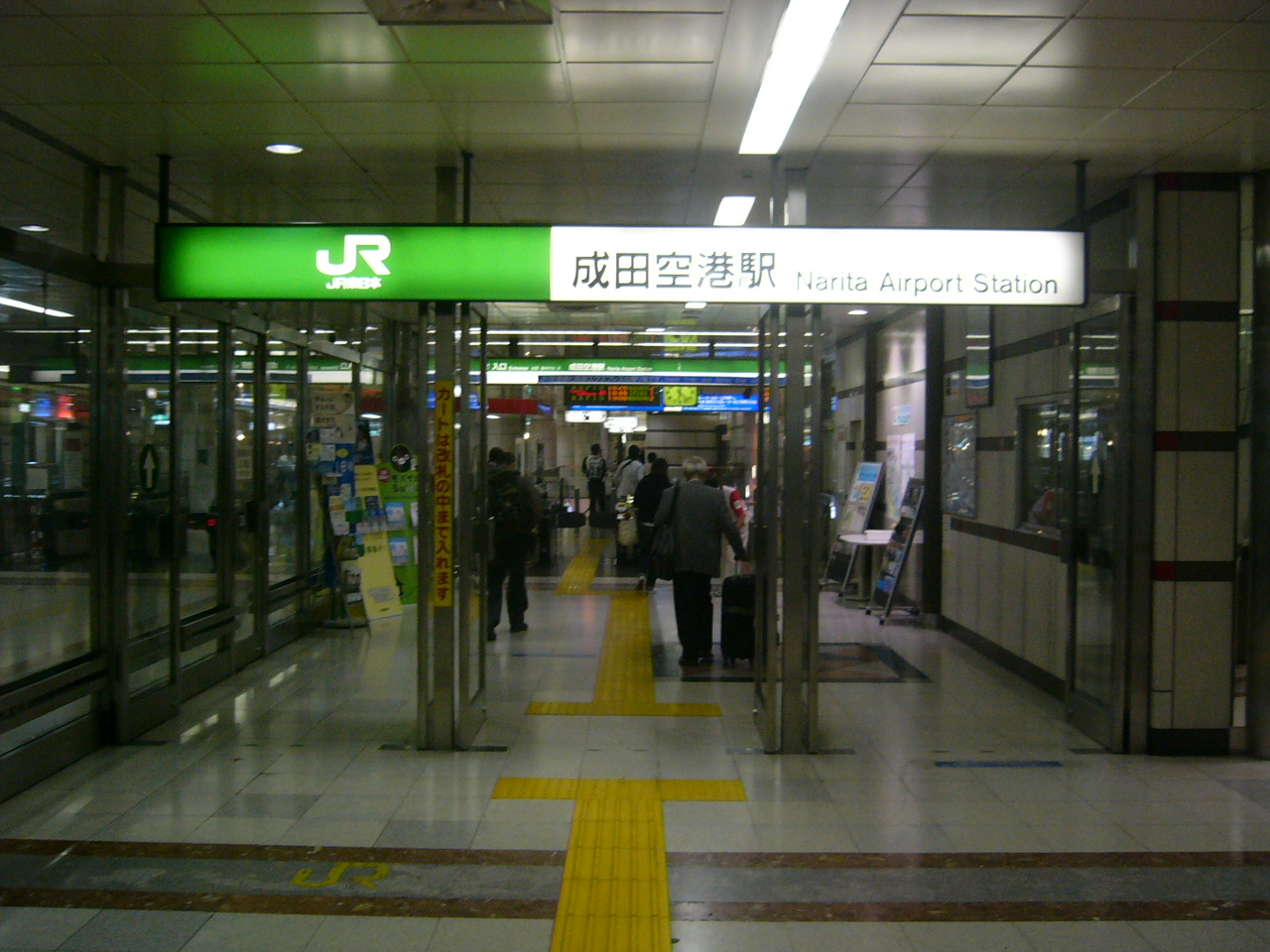
JR and Keisei entrances are adjacent with Keisei on the left

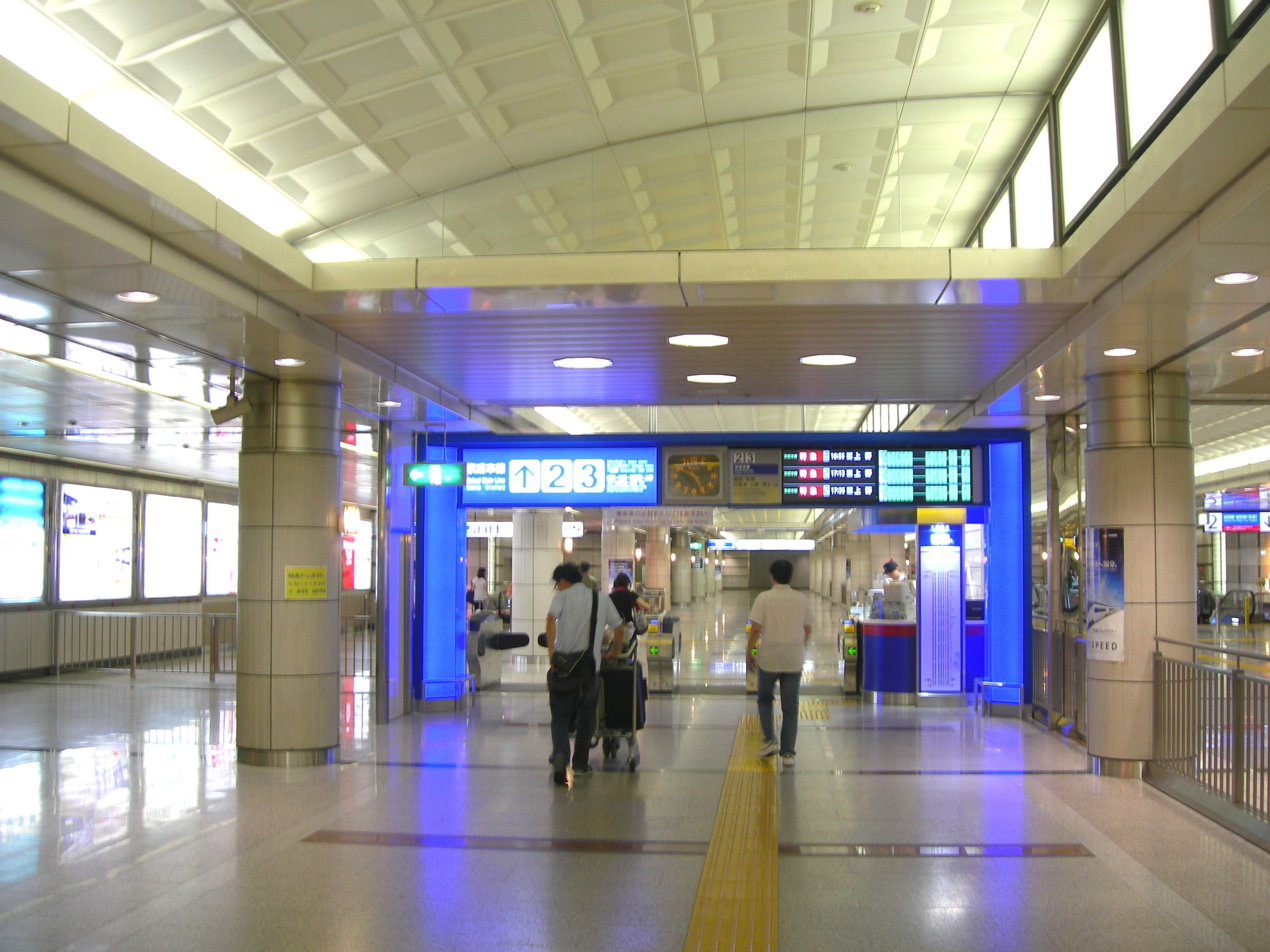
Intermediate ticket barriers at the Keisei entrance

== History ==
There was previously a station named Narita Airport Station, which was served only by Keisei and connected with the airport terminal by bus, since a future station connecting directly to the airport terminal was reserved for the future Narita Shinkansen. It was renamed Higashi-Narita Station on the same day that Narita Airport Terminal 1 Station opened.

Originally built for the planned Narita Shinkansen, Narita Airport Terminal 1 Station opened on 19 March 1991.

On 17 July 2010, the same day that Skyliner limited express services began operations on the Narita Sky Access Line, the layout of Keisei Line platforms and concourses was changed. For details, see "Station layout" section above. The station also received a station number for Keisei services on that date; Narita Airport Terminal 1 Station was assigned station number KS42.

== See also ==
- List of railway stations in Japan
