= Keisei AE100 series =

Japanese train type

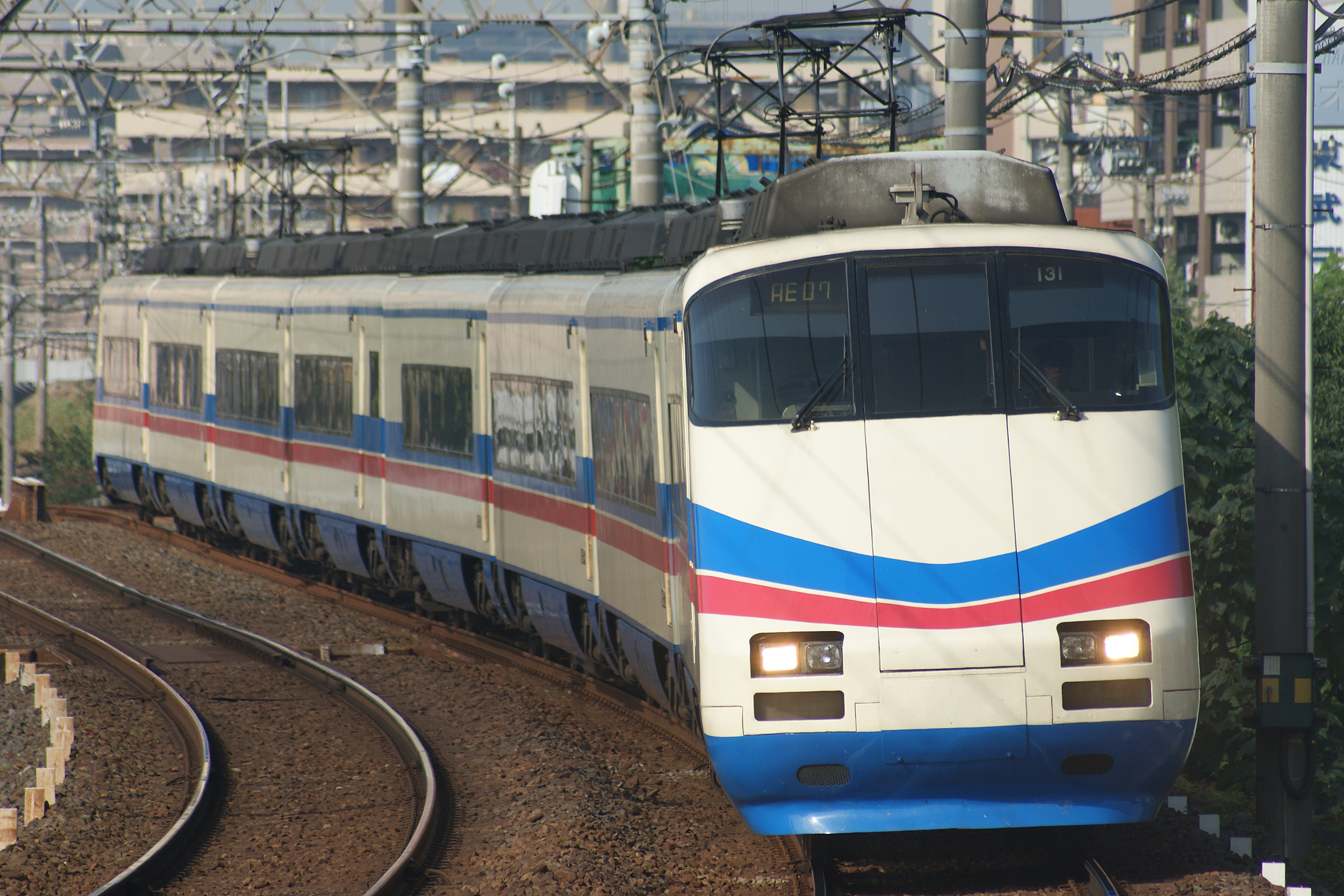
- A Keisei AE100 series on a Skyliner service in October 2008
- In service: June 1990 – February 2016
- Manufacturer: Nippon Sharyo
- Replaced: Keisei AE series
- Constructed: 1990–1993
- Entered service: 19 June 1990
- Refurbished: 2001–2003
- Scrapped: 2010–2016
- Number built: 56 vehicles (7 sets)
- Number in service: None
- Number preserved: 1 vehicle
- Number scrapped: 55 vehicles
- Formation: 8 cars per trainset
- Operators: Keisei Electric Railway
- Lines served: Keisei Main Line

Specifications
- Car body construction: Steel
- Doors: 1 per side
- Maximum speed: 110 km/h (68 mph)
- Traction system: Variable frequency (GTO)
- Electric system(s): 1,500 V DC
- Current collection: Overhead wire
- Track gauge: 1,435 mm (4 ft 8 1/2 in)

The Keisei AE100 series (京成AE100形) was a DC electric multiple unit (EMU) train type operated between 1990 and 2016 by the private railway operator Keisei Electric Railway on Cityliner limited express services between Tokyo and Keisei Narita in Japan. First entering service in June 1990, the trains replaced the earlier AE series EMUs operating on Skyliner services providing a link between Tokyo and Narita Airport. They had a slant-nosed design with hidden headlamps.

== Formation ==
The sets were formed as shown below, with six motored (M) cars and two unpowered trailer (T) cars, and car 1 at the Narita end.

Car No.	1	2	3	4	5	6	7	8
Designation	M2C	M1	T	M2	M1'	T	M1	M2C
Numbering	1x1	1x2	1x3	1x4	1x5	1x6	1x7	1x8

- Cars 2 and 7 were each fitted with two scissors-type pantographs.
- The "x" in the individual car numbering corresponded to the set number (0 to 6).
- Cars 1 and 8 were originally designated as smoking cars, but all cars became no-smoking from 17 July 2010.

== Interior ==
Passenger accommodation consisted of standard class seating only, configured 2+2 abreast with pairs of reclining seats that could be rotated to face the direction of travel. Car 4 was equipped with a toilet and also a wheelchair space. Car 5 had a drink vending machine.

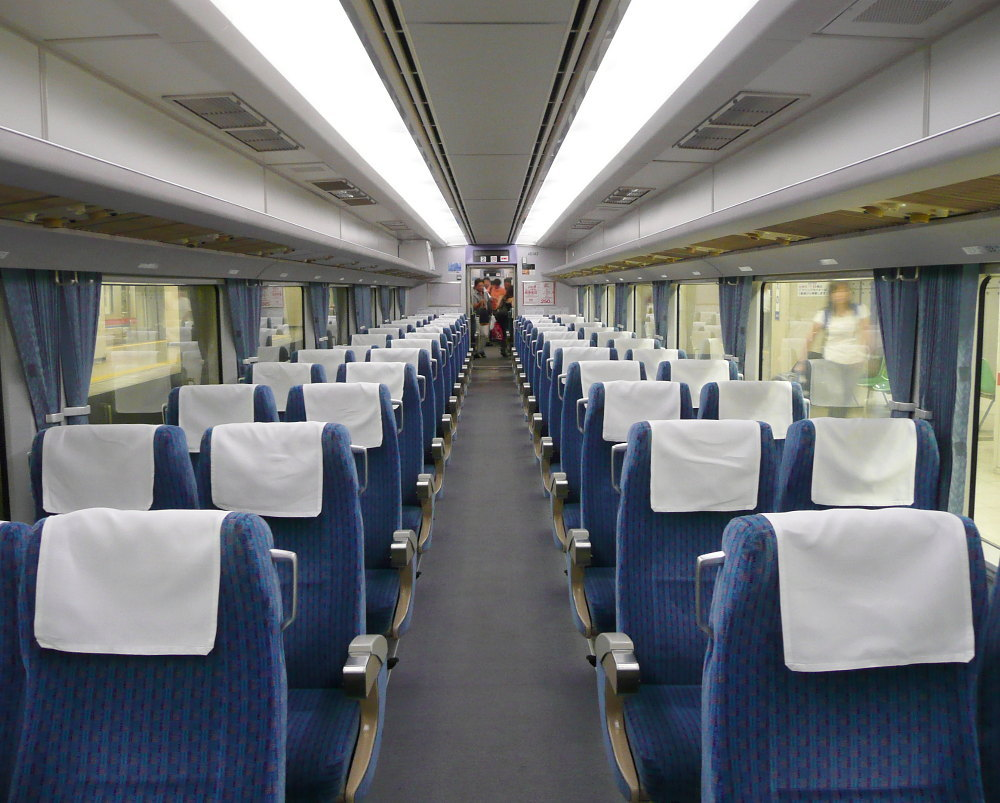
Interior view, July 2007

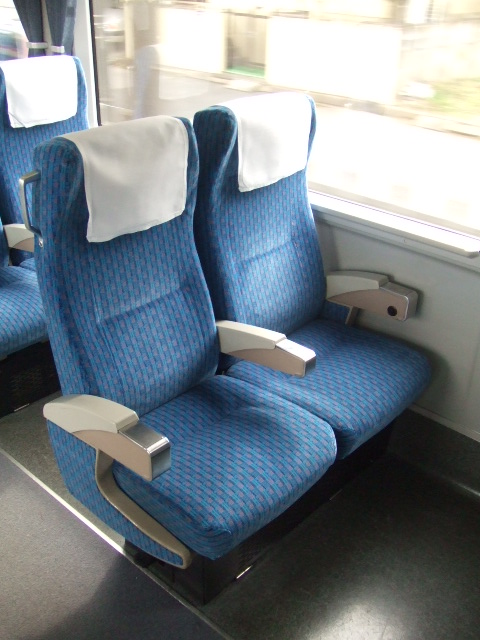
Seats

== History ==
The first trains were introduced from June 1990, replacing the earlier AE series sets.

The fleet underwent refurbishment between 2001 and 2003, with modifications internally to improve wheelchair accessibility, and changes to the moquette seat covers. From 17 July 2010, all AE100 series trains were transferred to Cityliner services.

Following the reduction in the number of Cityliner services, five of the original seven sets were withdrawn and scrapped between 2010 and 2012, leaving just two sets in operation.

From the start of the revised timetable on 5 December 2015, regular Cityliner services were discontinued, leaving the two remaining AE100 series sets without regular duties, although seasonal services were scheduled to continue until the end of January 2016. Two special farewell runs were organized by Keisei Travel on 21 and 28 February 2016, following which the AE100 series trains were officially withdrawn.

== Preserved examples ==
One car, AE161, is preserved at Sogo Depot in Shisui, Chiba Prefecture.
