= Mita Station =

Metro station in Tokyo, Japan

Coordinates: 35°38′53″N 139°44′56″E

Mita Station 三田駅

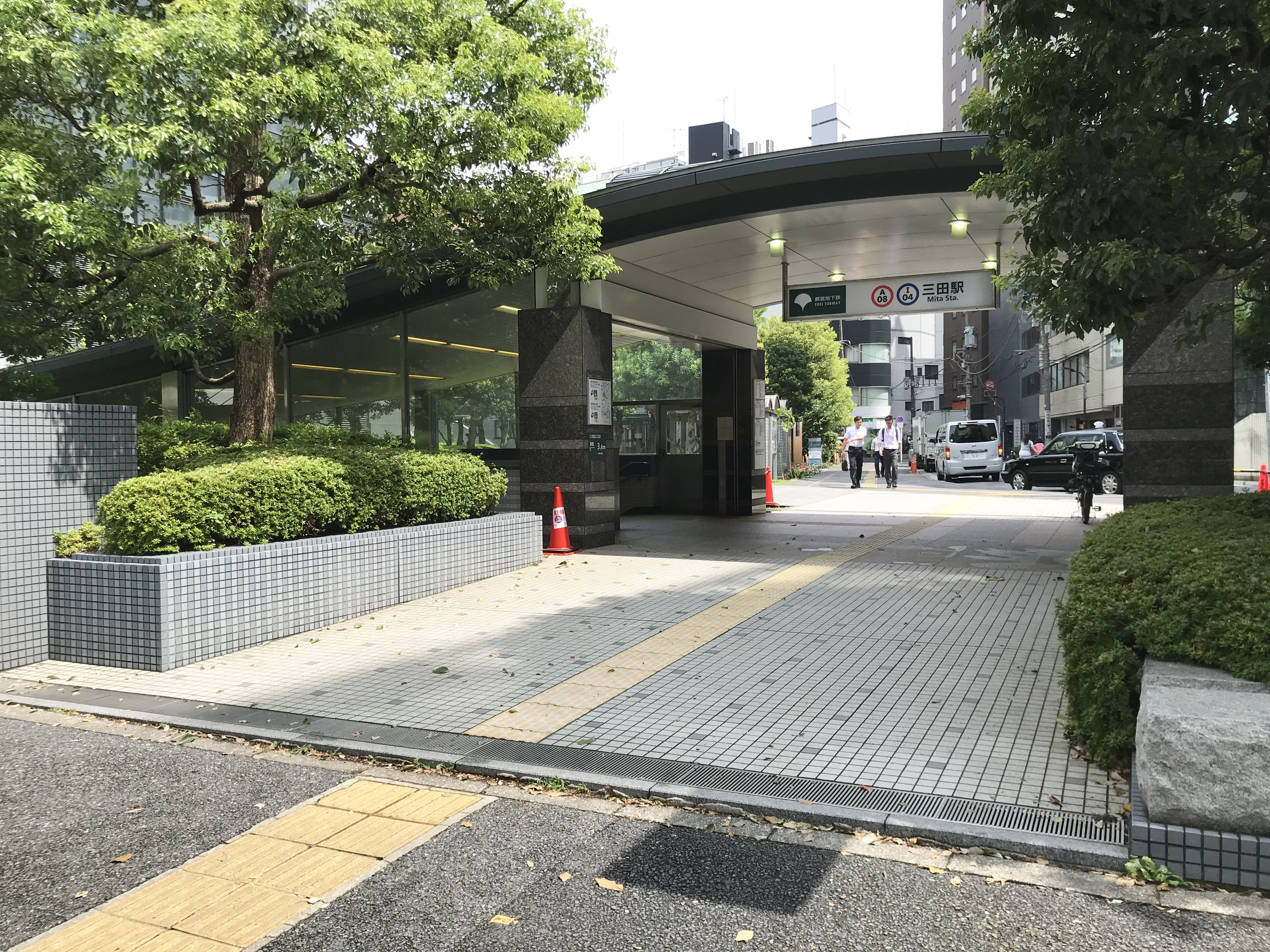
- Station entrance A9, August 2019

General information
- Location: 5-34-10 (Asakusa Line); 5-18-8 (Mita Line) Shiba, Minato-ku, Tokyo; Japan
- Operator: Toei Subway
- Lines: Asakusa Line; Mita Line
- Platforms: 1 island platform (Asakusa Line); 2 split-level side platforms (Mita Line)
- Tracks: 4 (2 for each line)

Construction
- Structure type: Underground
- Platform levels: 3

Other information
- Station code: A-08; I-04

History
- Opened: 21 June 1968; 58 years ago

Services
Preceding station	Toei Subway	Following station
Sengakuji Terminus	Asakusa Line Airport Limited Express	Daimon towards Oshiage
Sengakuji towards Nishi-magome	Asakusa Line	Daimon towards Oshiage
Shirokane-takanawa towards Meguro	Mita Line	Shibakoen towards Nishi-Takashimadaira
Location
- Location within Tokyo Yamanote Loop Location within Tokyo wards area Location within Japan

Mita Station (三田駅, Mita-eki) is a subway station in Minato, Tokyo, Japan, operated by Tokyo Metropolitan Bureau of Transportation (Toei). It is served by Toei Subway's Asakusa and Mita lines. It is adjacent to Tamachi Station on the Yamanote Line and Keihin-Tōhoku Line and is a major station for commuters due to the proximity of many office and condominium developments. It is also the closest station to the main campus of Keio University.

Despite its name, the station is not located in Mita, but in the neighboring Shiba district.

== Lines ==
Mita Station is served by the following lines.

- Toei Asakusa Line (with through services to the Keikyu Main Line, Keisei Oshiage Line, Keisei Higashi-Narita Line, and Shibayama Railway Line)
- Toei Mita Line (with through services to the Tokyu Meguro Line)

== Station layout ==
The station consists of two sets of platforms, for the Asakusa Line and Mita Line. The Asakusa Line is served by an island platform (platforms 1 and 2) located on the second basement ("B2F") level, while the Mita Line is served by two side platforms located on separate levels, with the southbound platform (platform 3) on the second basement ("B2F") level, and the northbound platform (platform 4) on the third basement ("B3F") level.

=== Platforms ===
1
Asakusa Line
for Sengakuji, Nishi-Magome
Keikyu Main Line for Haneda Airport and Misakiguchi
2
Asakusa Line
for Nihombashi and Oshiage
Keisei Main Line for Aoto, Keisei Takasago, Keisei Sakura, Keisei Narita, and Narita Airport (Terminal 2·3 and Terminal 1)
Hokusō Line for Imba Nihon-idai
Narita Sky Access Line for Narita Airport
Shibayama Railway Line for Shibayama-Chiyoda
3
Mita Line
- for Shirokane-takanawa and Meguro
- Meguro Line for Musashi-Kosugi and Hiyoshi
- Sotetsu Main Line for Ebina via the Tokyu/Sotetsu Shin-Yokohama Line
- Sotetsu Izumino Line for Shōnandai via the Tokyu/Sotetsu Shin-Yokohama Line
4
Mita Line
for Ōtemachi, Sugamo, and Nishi-Takashimadaira

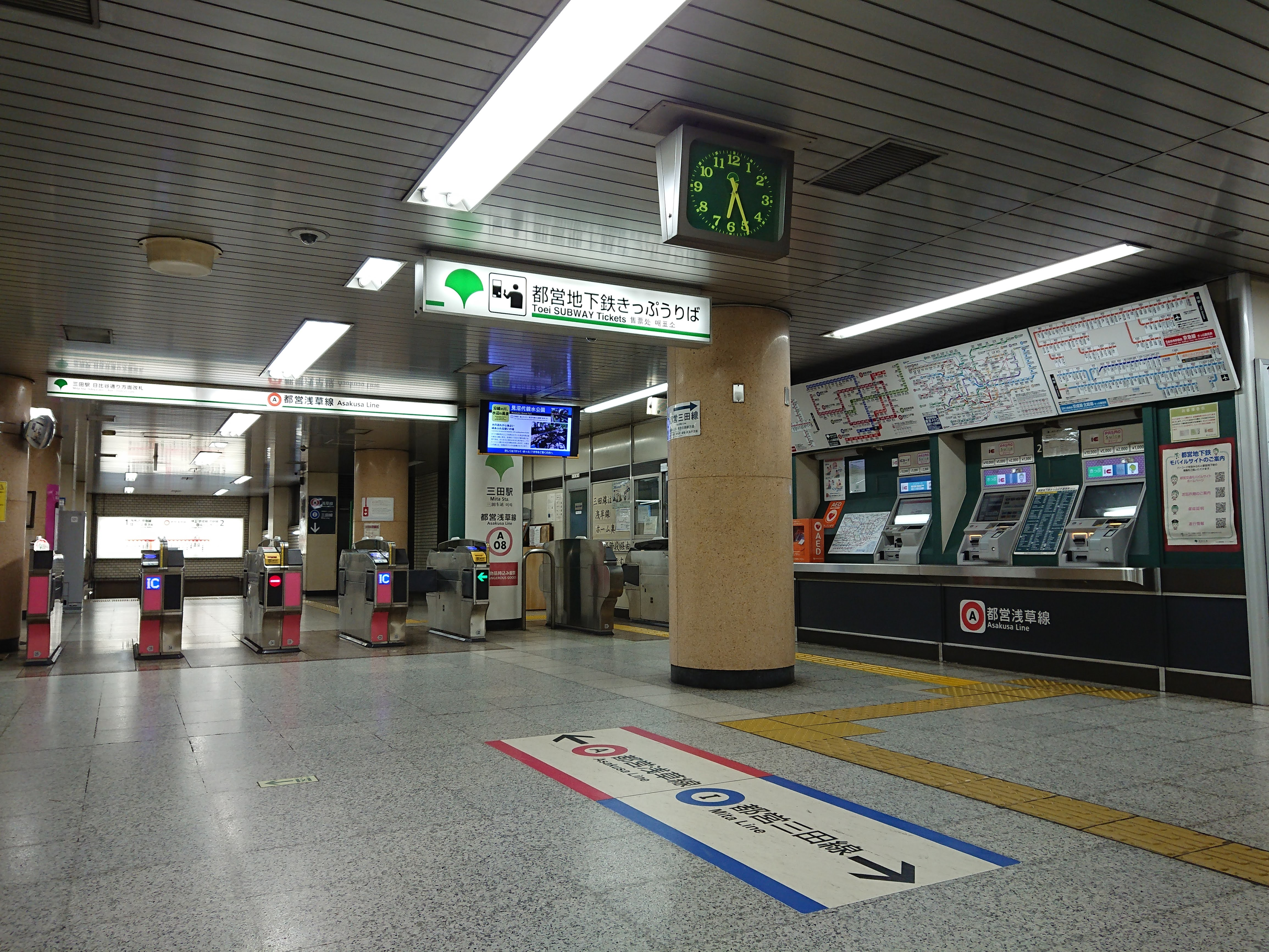
Ticket gates

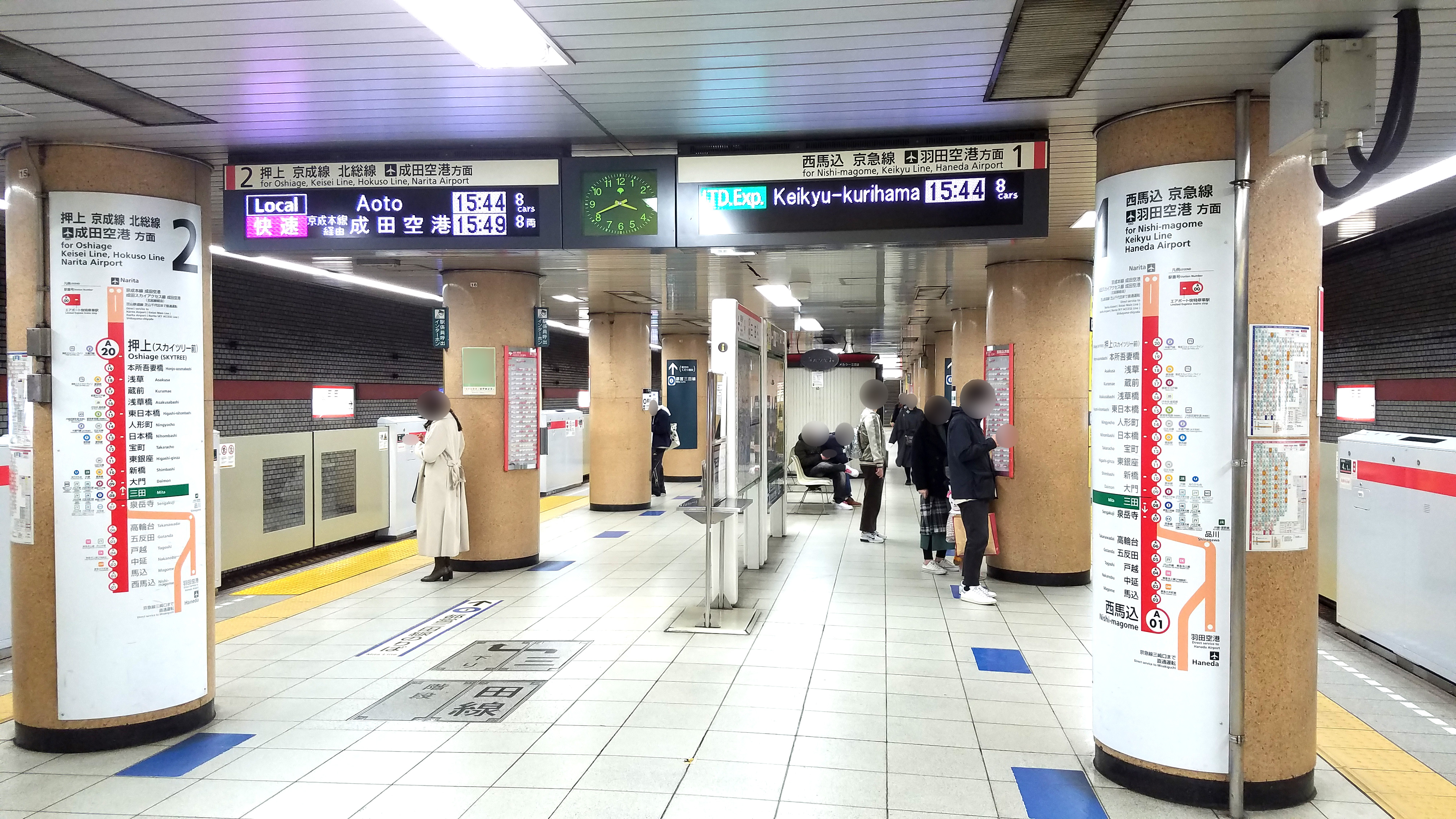
Platforms 1 and 2

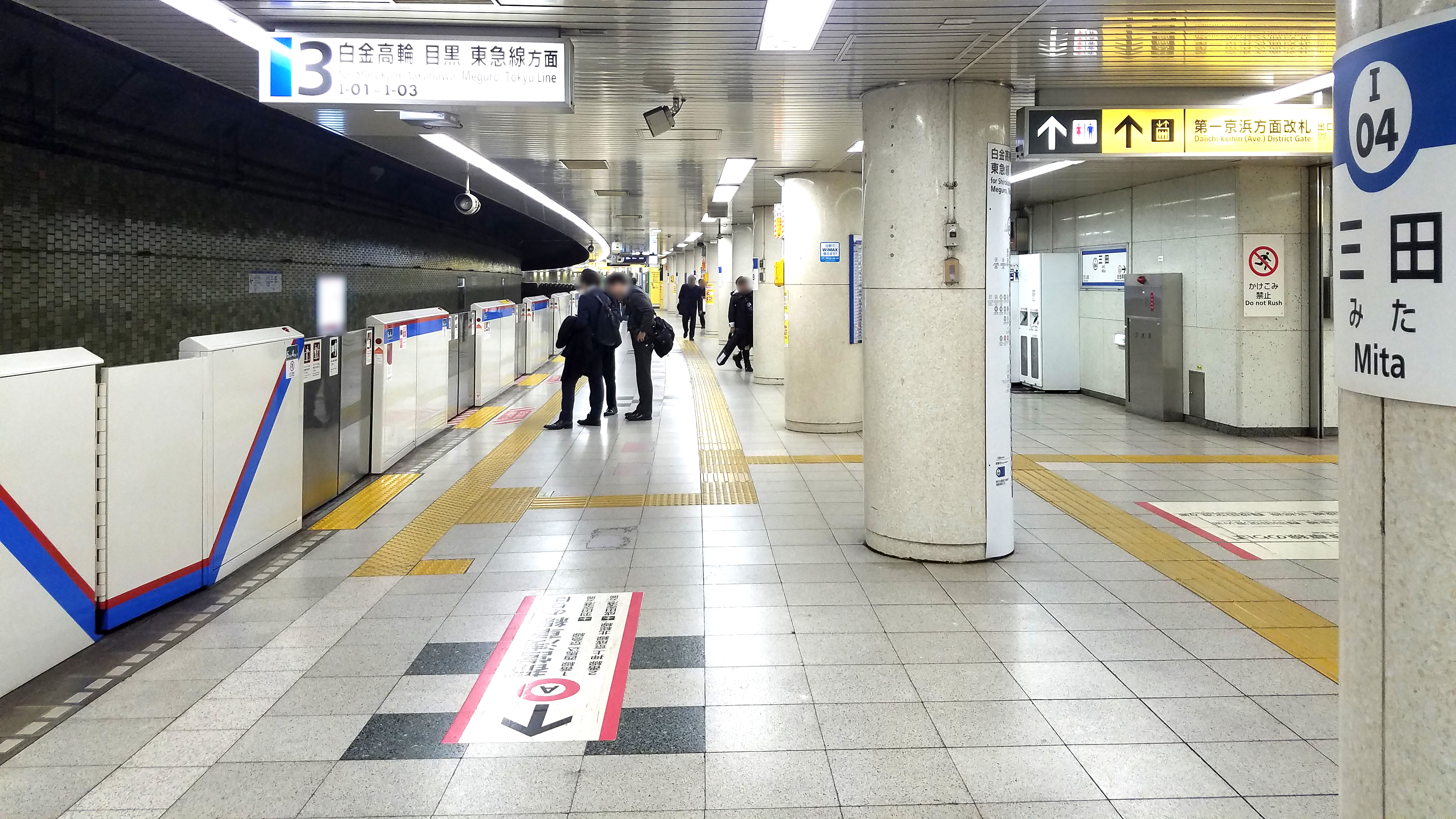
Platform 3

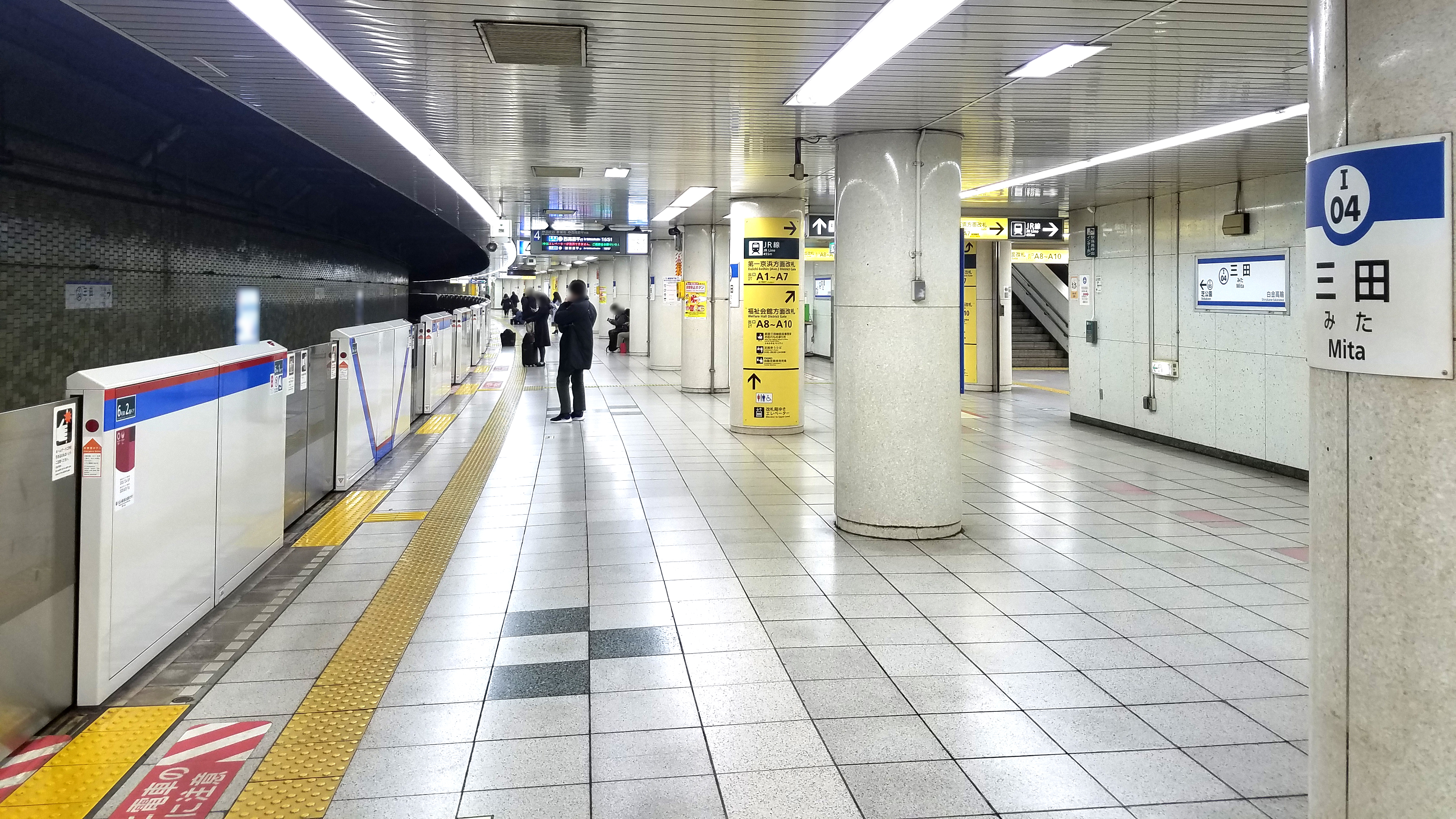
Platform 4

== History ==
The station opened on 21 June 1968, initially served only by the Toei Asakusa Line. The Mita Line station opened on 27 November 1973.

== In popular culture ==
Mita station was featured in English rock band The Police's So Lonely (1980) music video.
