= Narita Airport Station (disambiguation) =

Narita Airport Station may refer to:

- The Narita Airport Station(Japanese: 成田空港駅, Japanese pronunciation: [Narita-kūkō-eki])(1991–2015), now Narita Airport Terminal 1 Station
- The Keisei Narita Airport Station (1978–1991), now Higashi-Narita Station

== See also ==
- Narita Airport Terminal 2·3 Station
