= Shirokane-takanawa Station =

Metro station in Tokyo, Japan

Coordinates: 35°38′35.46″N 139°44′2.86″E

Shirokane-takanawa Station 白金高輪駅

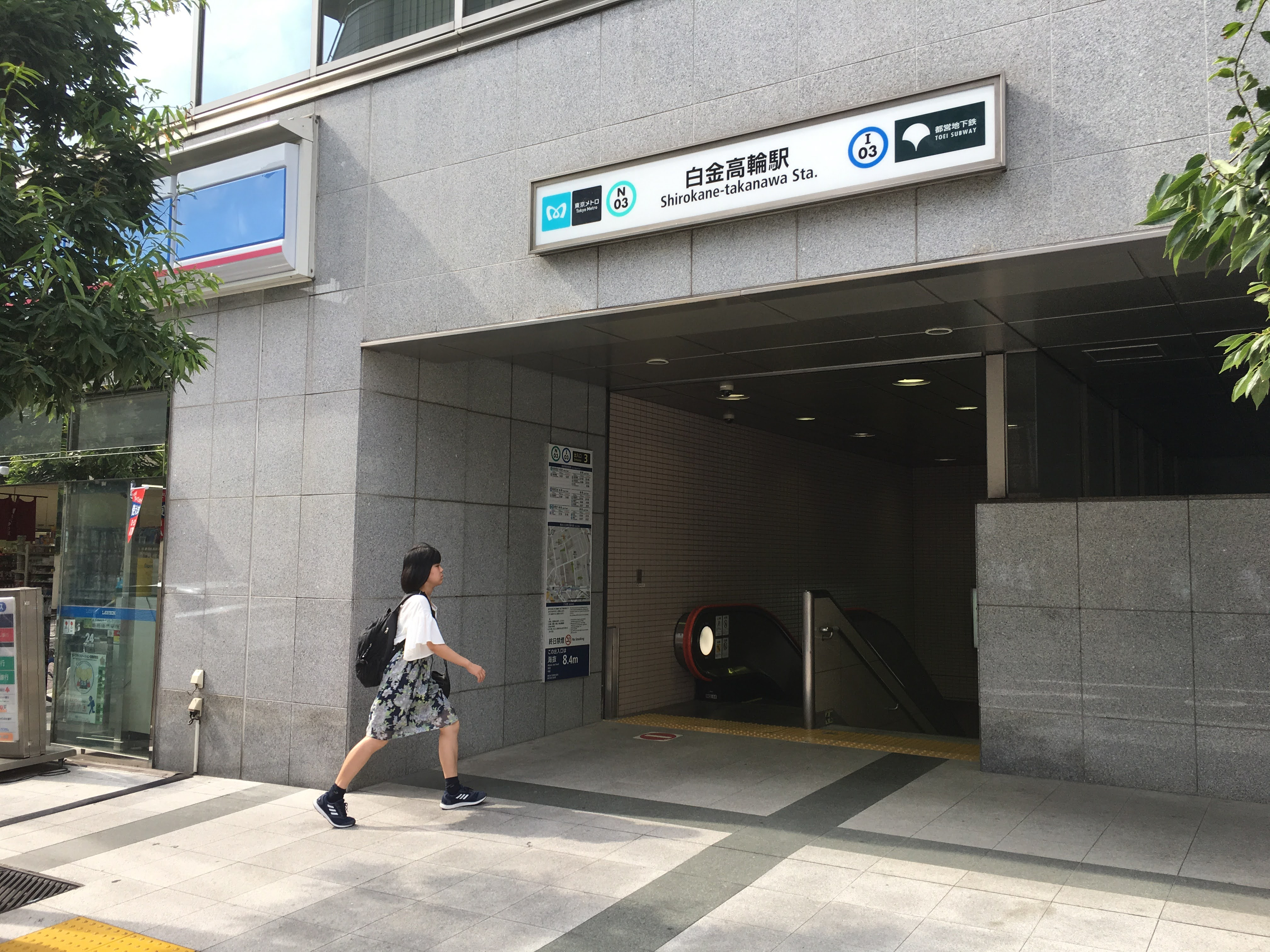
- Station entrance, 2018

General information
- Location: 1 Chome-3-20 Takanawa, Minato, Tokyo; Japan
- System: Tokyo subway
- Owner: Tokyo Metro Co., Ltd. Tokyo Metropolitan Government
- Operator: Tokyo Metro; Toei Subway
- Platforms: 2 island platforms (shared)
- Tracks: 4

Construction
- Structure type: Underground

Other information
- Station code: N-03, I-03

History
- Opened: 26 September 2000; 25 years ago

Services
Preceding station	Tokyo Metro	Following station
Shirokanedai towards Meguro	Namboku Line	Azabu-juban towards Akabane-iwabuchi
Preceding station	Toei Subway	Following station
Shirokanedai towards Meguro	Mita Line	Mita towards Nishi-Takashimadaira
Location
- Location within Tokyo Yamanote Loop Location within Tokyo wards area Location within Japan

Shirokane-takanawa Station (白金高輪駅, Shirokane-takanawa-eki) is a subway station in Takanawa 1-chōme, Minato, Tokyo, Japan, jointly operated by the two Tokyo subway operators, Tokyo Metro and Toei Subway.

== Lines ==
- Tokyo Metro Namboku Line (N-03)
- Toei Mita Line (I-03)

Namboku Line and Mita Line shares their lines between this station and Meguro station, the two lines' terminal. The trains from Shirokane-takanawa station either run onto the Namboku Line toward Azabu-juban, or run onto the Mita Line toward Mita, or be terminated at this station.

== Station layout ==
Track diagram of the station

=== Tokyo Metro and Toei ===
The station consists of two island platforms serving four tracks. Mita Line uses the outer two tracks and Namboku Line uses the inner two tracks. Trains going northward uses platforms 1 and 2, ones going southward uses platforms 3 and 4, so that passengers can change their trains smoothly. The ticket gates are on the first basement floor and the platforms are on the third basement floor. The ticket gates are also shared with both Tokyo Metro and Toei. Passengers don't need to go through ticket gates to change their trains.

1
Mita Line
for Nishi-Takashimadaira
2
Namboku Line
for Akabane-Iwabuchi
Saitama Rapid Railway Line for Urawa-Misono
3
Namboku Line
- for Meguro
- Meguro Line for Musashi-Kosugi and Hiyoshi
- Sotetsu Main Line for Ebina via the Tokyu/Sotetsu Shin-Yokohama Line
- Sotetsu Izumino Line for Shōnandai via the Tokyu/Sotetsu Shin-Yokohama Line
4
Mita Line

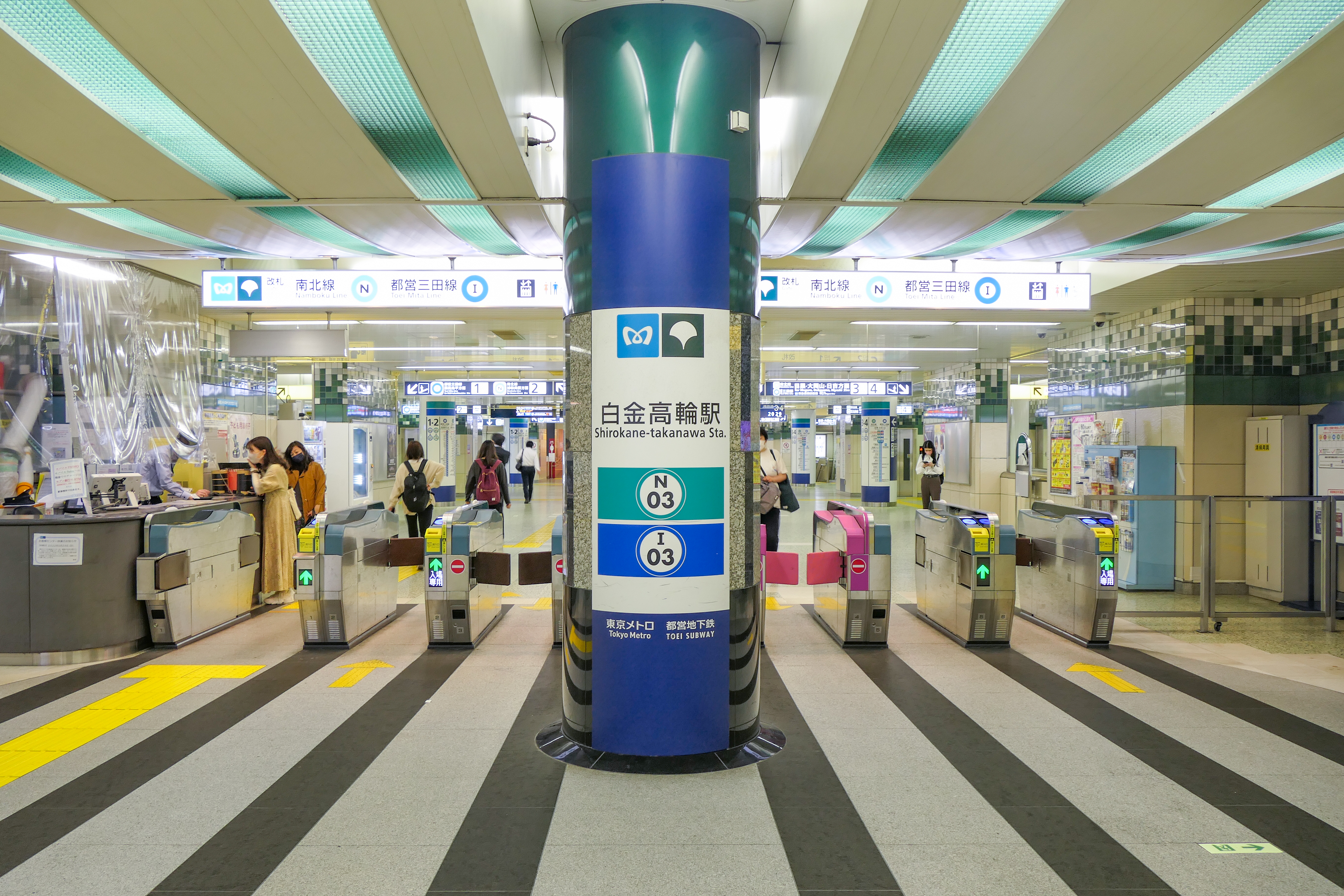
Ticket gates

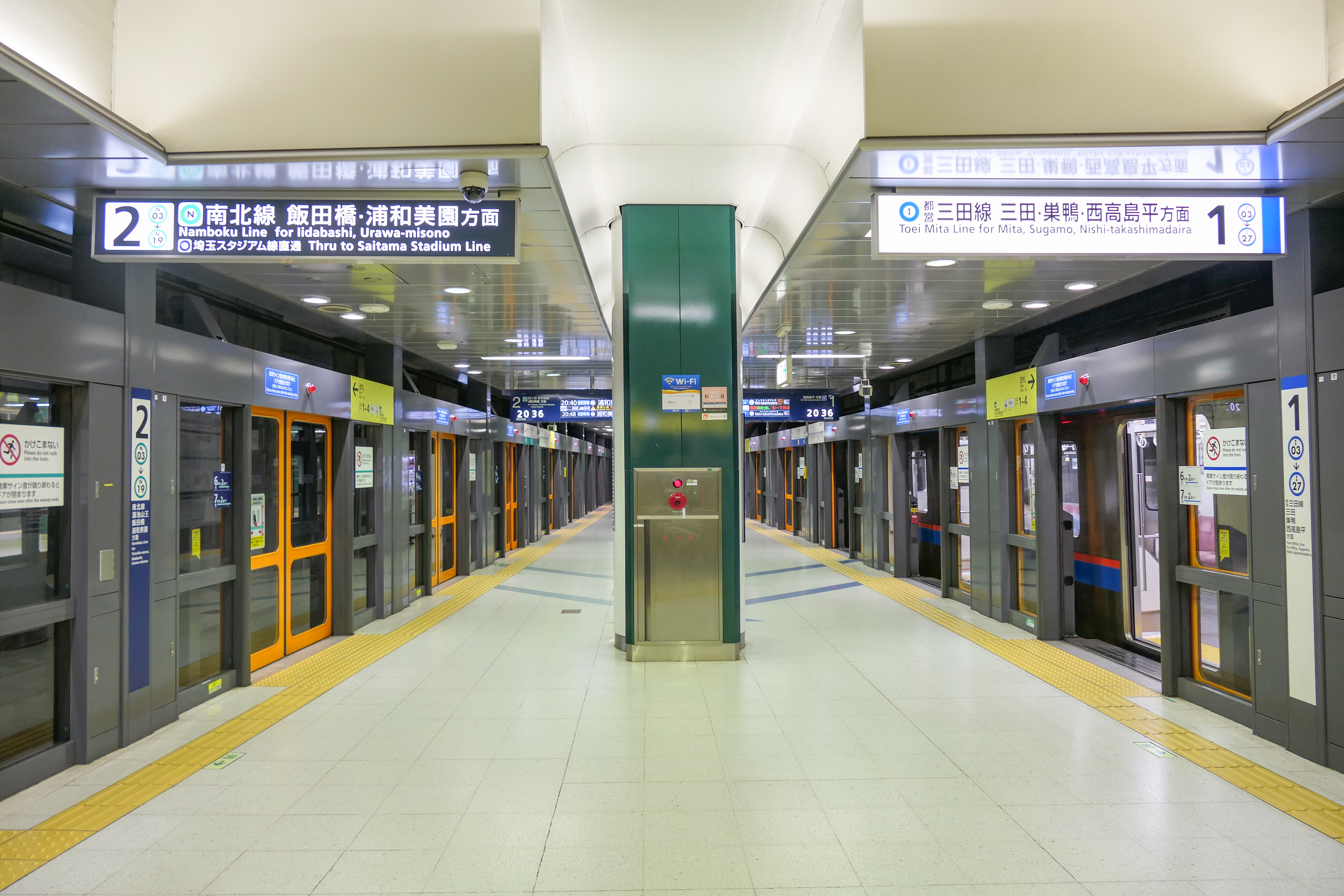
Platforms 1 and 2

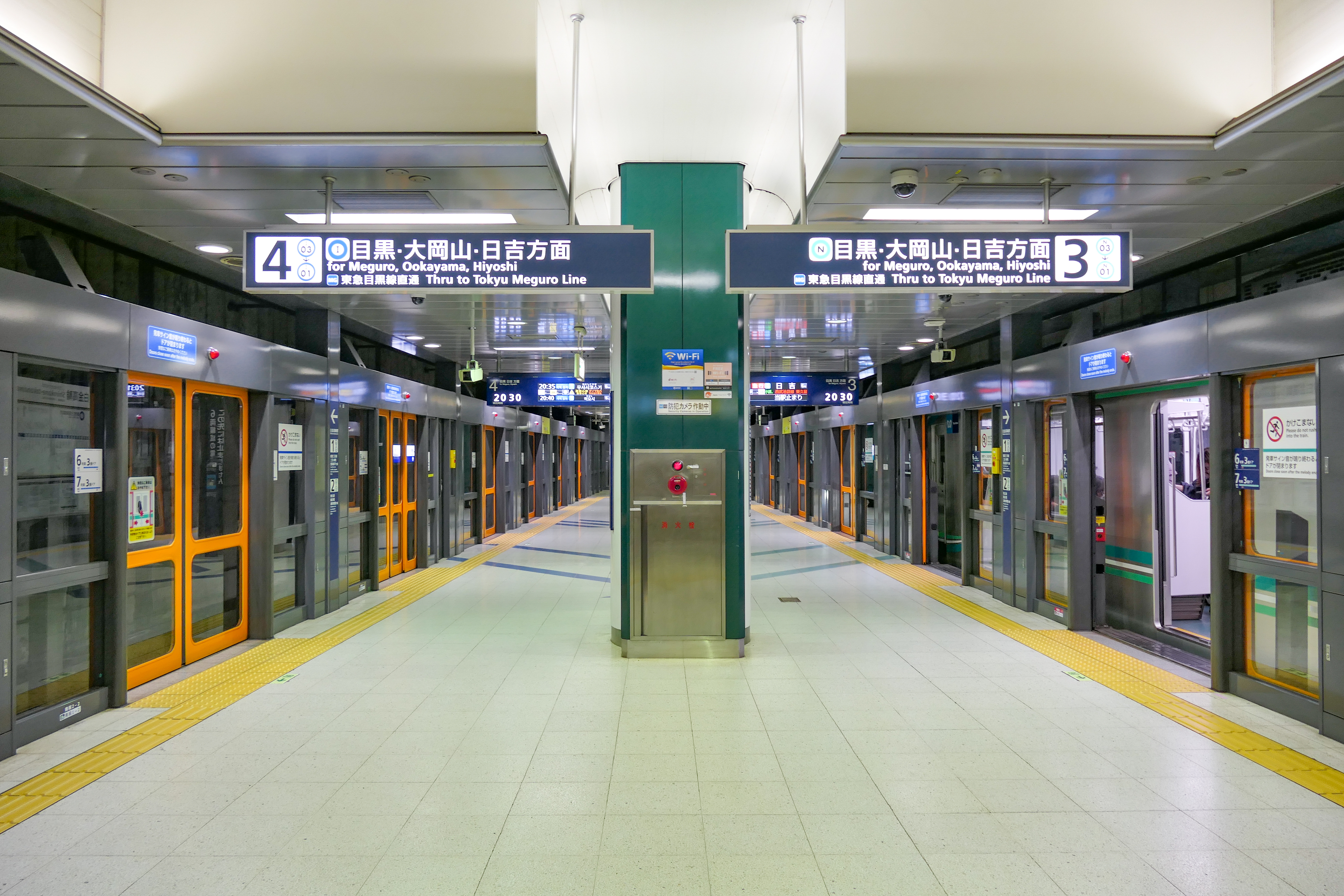
Platforms 3 and 4

== History ==
Shirokane-takanawa Station opened on September 26, 2000. Prior to its opening, the station's provisional name was Seishokomae Station.

The station facilities of the Namboku Line were inherited by Tokyo Metro after the privatization of the Teito Rapid Transit Authority (TRTA) in 2004.

On August 25, 2021, an acid attack took place at the station where a 22-year-old businessman sustained burns to his face, while a 34-year-old woman had burns on her legs.
