= Shibayama Railway =

Railway company in Chiba Prefecture, Japan

Shibayama Railway Line

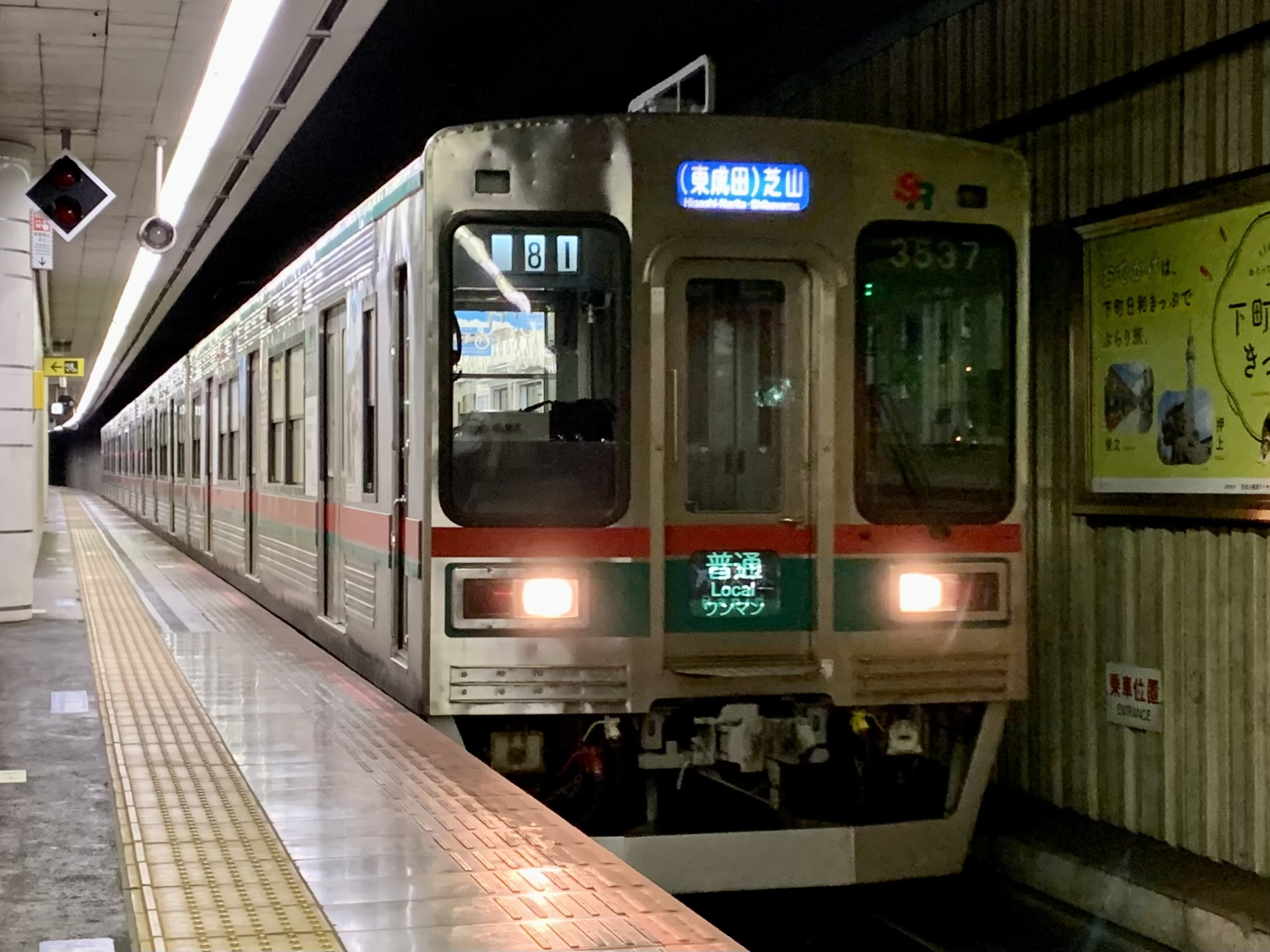
- A Keisei 3500 series EMU in Higashi Narita Station in 2023

Overview
- Owner: Shibayama Railway Co., Ltd. (Narita International Airport Corporation)
- Locale: Chiba Prefecture, Japan
- Termini: Higashi-Narita; Shibayama-Chiyoda
- Stations: 2

Service
- Type: Heavy rail
- Operator: Keisei Electric Railway (under contract)
- Rolling stock: Keisei 3500 series EMU
- Daily ridership: 1,419 (2023)

History
- Opened: October 22, 2002; 23 years ago

Technical
- Line length: 2.2 km (1.4 mi)
- Number of tracks: 1
- Track gauge: 1,435 mm (4 ft 8 1/2 in) standard gauge
- Electrification: Overhead line, 1,500 V DC
- Operating speed: 85 km/h (53 mph)

The Shibayama Railway Company, Ltd. (Note: Japanese: 芝山鉄道株式会社, Hepburn: Shibayama Tetsudō kabushiki-gaisha) is a third-sector railway company in Chiba Prefecture, Japan. It operates the 2.2-kilometre (1.4 mi) Shibayama Railway Line between Higashi-Narita Station and Shibayama-Chiyoda Station, the shortest railway line in Japan. The company was founded on May 1, 1981. Construction of the line began in 1998, and the line opened on October 27, 2002.

As of March 2019, Narita International Airport Corporation held a majority stake in Shibayama Railway. Although the Shibayama Railway is an independent railway company, its line operates as an extension of the Keisei Higashi-Narita Line. A single trainset operates the service, running between Shibayama-Chiyoda Station and Keisei Narita Station via Higashi-Narita Station, with trains operating at approximately 40-minute intervals. Train operations are contracted to Keisei Electric Railway.

== History ==
The Shibayama Railway Company was founded on May 1, 1981. The company received an operating permit on June 24, 1988, to operate a 2.0-kilometre (1.2 mi) line between Shibayama-Chiyoda Station (Note: At that time it was given the provisional name Seibijyō-Mae Station.) and Higashi-Narita Station. (Note: At that time it was given the provisional name Shibatetsu Narita Airport Station.) Smaller trains were initially planned for operation on the line. In 1990, following requests from local residents who wanted the possibility of through services to Tokyo, the company applied for permission to operate standard-sized trains. The application was approved two days later. That year, the company also applied for permission to provide through service to Keisei Narita Station via Higashi-Narita Station, which was approved in 1996.

The railway was developed as Narita International Airport embarked on an expansion project, in part to appease residents of Shibayama who had opposed the airport's original construction and complained that it had disrupted existing transportation routes and cut off parts of Shibayama from Narita City and other areas to the west. The airport's original construction had been highly controversial and sparked the prolonged Sanrizuka Struggle. Narita International Airport Corporation provided substantial funding for construction of the railway as part of efforts to address these longstanding concerns.

On March 19, 1991, Keisei opened a new line providing direct rail access to Narita Airport using infrastructure originally constructed for the canceled Narita Shinkansen project. The former Narita Airport Station was renamed Higashi-Narita Station, and the route between Keisei Narita Station and Higashi-Narita became the Keisei Higashi-Narita Line.

Construction of the Shibayama Railway Line began in 1998. Construction was heavily delayed by difficulties acquiring land, and the planned route was extended by 0.2 km (220 yards) in 2000. The southern terminus, which had been provisionally named Seibijyō-Mae, was also named Shibayama-Chiyoda Station that year. The line opened on October 27, 2002.

The line opened with only one station, Shibayama-Chiyoda Station, on the southeastern edge of the airport complex. The station is in an area dominated by warehouses and airport-related offices and facilities and is several kilometers from central Shibayama, limiting its usefulness as a station for the town itself. A proposal to extend the line toward central Shibayama was made by the Ministry of Land, Infrastructure and Transport.

== Stations and operation ==
Although the Shibayama Railway is an independent operator, its line functions as an extension of the Keisei Higashi-Narita Line, with all trains providing through service to lines operated by Keisei Electric Railway. Keisei also provides the leased rolling stock and train crews used on the line.

Unlike most Keisei-operated lines, IC cards are not accepted on the line, and fares must be paid using paper tickets.

For most of the day, a single trainset operates the service, shuttling between Shibayama-Chiyoda Station and Keisei Narita Station via Higashi-Narita Station and providing through service on the Higashi-Narita Line, with trains operating at approximately 40-minute intervals. During the morning and evening rush hours, some trains provide through service to or from stations in Tokyo.

Narita International Airport Corporation owns a 68.4% majority stake in Shibayama Railway as of March 2019. The remaining shares are held by Keisei Electric Railway, Japan Airlines, the Chiba prefectural government, and others.

No.	Station	Distance in km (mi)	Transfers	Location
↑ Through-running to/from Keisei Narita via Higashi-Narita Line ↑
KS44	Higashi-Narita 東成田	0 (0)	Higashi-Narita Line (through service)	Narita, Chiba
SR01	Shibayama-Chiyoda 芝山千代田	2.2 (1.4)		Shibayama, Chiba

== Line ==
The company operates a single line, the Shibayama Railway Line. The 2.2 km (1.4 mi) line connects Higashi-Narita and Shibayama-Chiyoda.

The Shibayama Railway company advertises the line as the shortest railway line in Japan and gives out certificates for using the line. However, the Kurama-dera Cable is the shortest funicular line in Japan with a length of 207 meters (226 yards), and Seinō Railway operates the shortest freight-only railway line with an operational length of 1.3 km (0.8 mi).

== Rolling stock ==
The Shibayama Railway leases its rolling stock from the Keisei Electric Railway company. The company has leased a Keisei 3500 series trainset since 2013. In 2022, the train's wrapping was changed to use red and green stripes, resembling the former 3600 series used on the line until 2013. During the time 3600 series was used by the Shibayama Railway, the train color was changed from Keisei's blue and red color scheme to red and green, the scheme used in the company's logo. This change was reverted when it was returned to Keisei.

== See also ==
- Wakayamako Line - another short railway line
