= Narita International Airport Corporation =

Japanese corporation

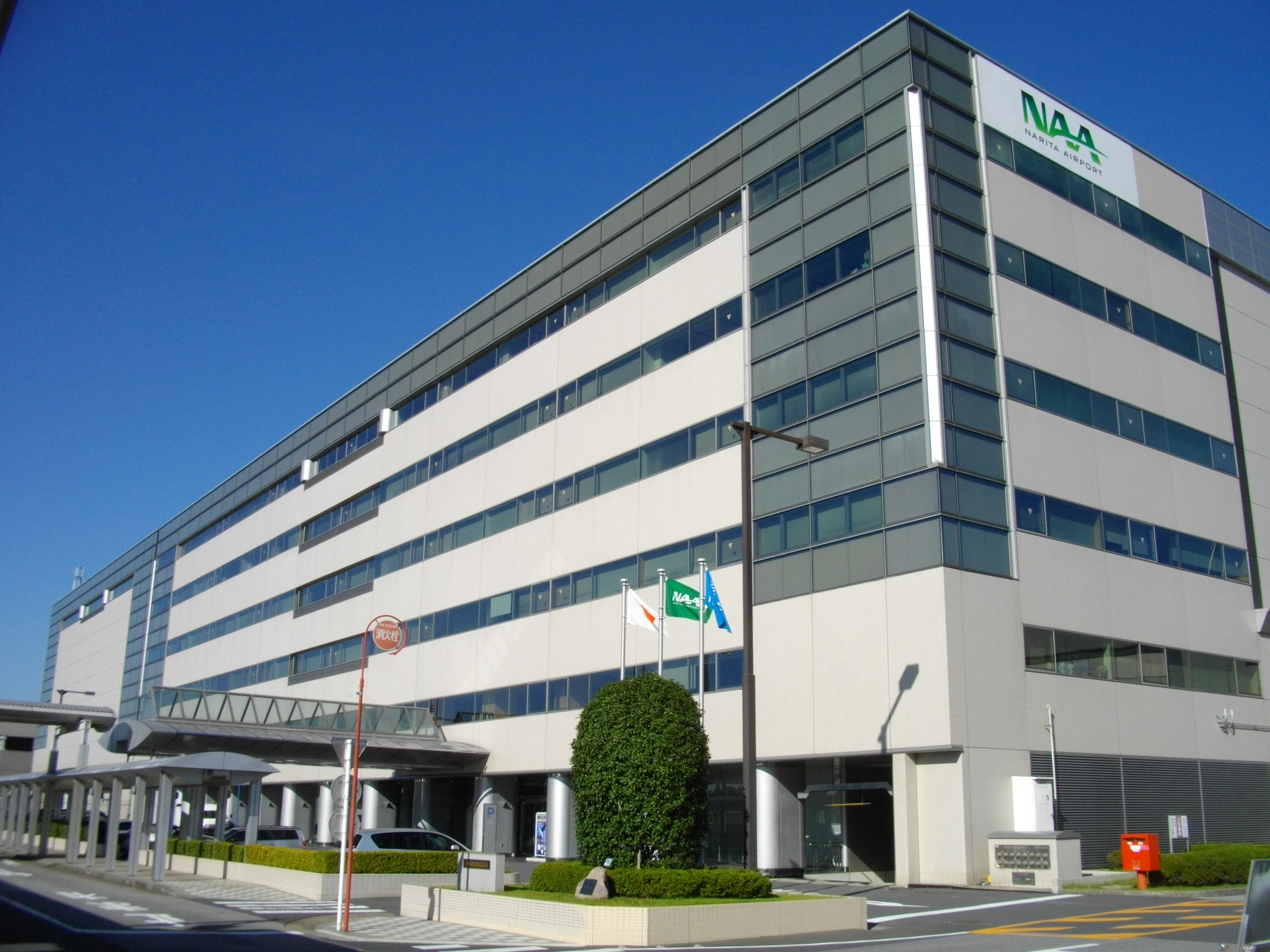
- Native name: 成田国際空港株式会社
- Romanized name: Narita Kokusai Kūkō Kabushiki-gaisha
- Company type: State-owned KK
- Industry: Airport authority
- Founded: April 1, 2004
- Headquarters: Narita, Chiba, Japan
- Key people: Akihiko Tamura, President & C.E.O.
- Revenue: JPY 104.6 bn (YE June 2009)
- Operating income: JPY 23.4 bn (YE June 2009)
- Net income: JPY 6.0 bn (YE June 2009)
- Owner: Ministry of Land, Infrastructure, Transport and Tourism
- Number of employees: 720 (July 2009)
- Website: www.naa.jp/en

Narita International Airport Corporation (成田国際空港株式会社, Narita Kokusai Kūkō Kabushiki Gaisha), abbreviated NAA, is a parastatal company responsible for the management of Narita International Airport in Japan. It is the successor to the New Tokyo International Airport Authority (新東京国際空港公団, Shin Tōkyō Kokusai Kūkō Kōdan) which was established on 30 July 1966. NAA was privatized on April 1, 2004.

== Operations ==
NAA has operations in four core segments:

- Airport operations: Maintains and manages the Narita Airport facilities.
- Retailing: Operates shops on the airport premises, including duty-free shopping.
- Facility leasing: Leases counter space, retail and office space, cargo warehouses, car park space and other property.
- Railways: Holds majority stakes in Shibayama Railway (68.39%) and Narita Rapid Rail Access (63.74%).

== Service ==
On April 16, 2018, NAA launched a new English-language tourist information website to provide overseas visitors to Japan with information on tourist attractions around Japan and their access from Narita Airport.
