= Keisei 3600 series =

Japanese electric multiple unit train type

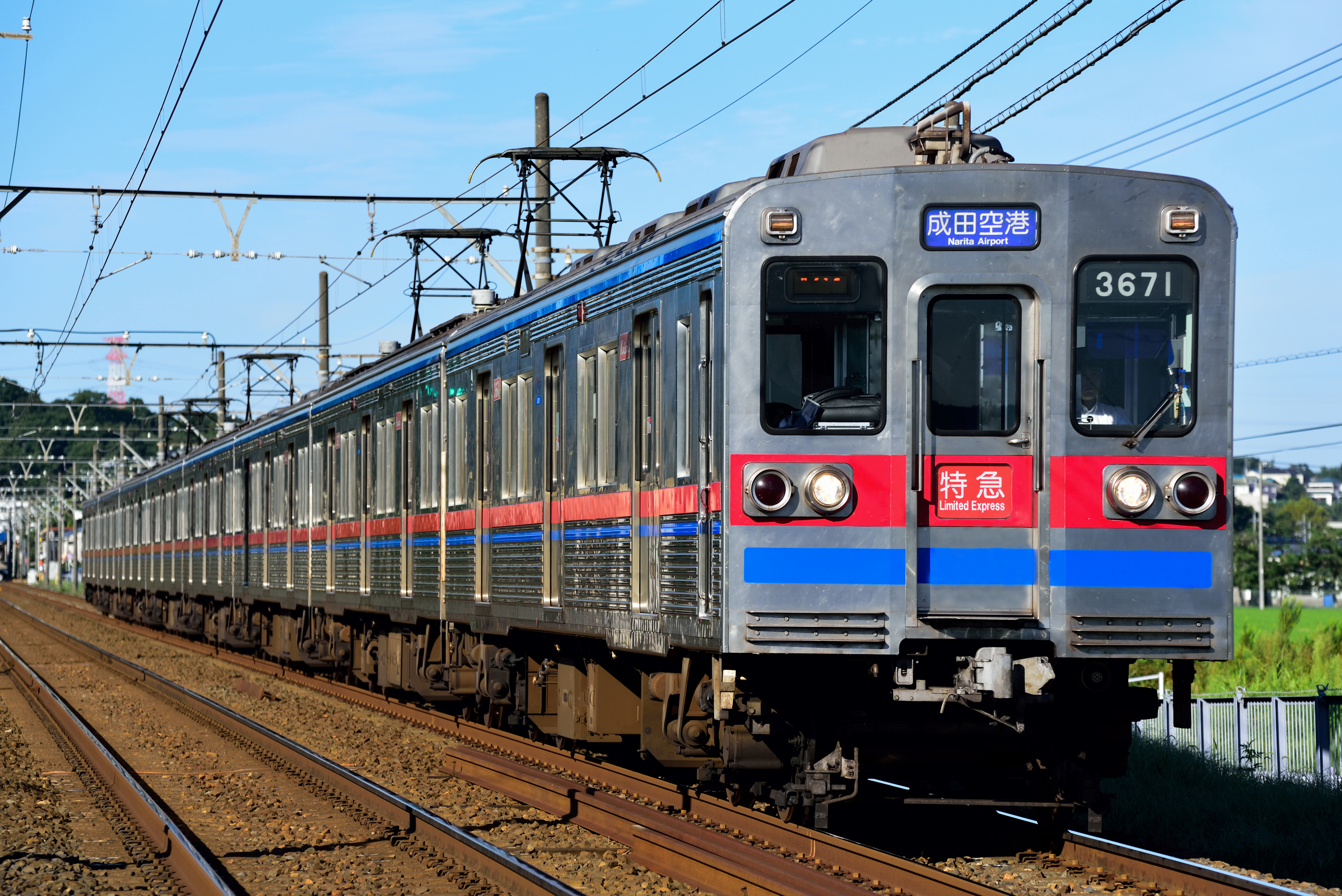
- Set 3678 on the Keisei Main line in 2017
- Manufacturers: Tokyu Car Corporation, Nippon Sharyo
- Replaced: 210 series, 700 series
- Constructed: 1982–1989
- Entered service: 1982
- Number built: 54 vehicles (initially 9 6-car sets)
- Number in service: 10 vehicles (2 sets) as of May 2024
- Formation: 8/6/4 cars per set
- Fleet numbers: 3608-3688
- Operator: Keisei Electric Railway
- Lines served: Keisei Main Line; Toei Asakusa Line; Shibayama Railway Line

Specifications
- Car body construction: Stainless steel
- Doors: 3 pairs per side
- Maximum speed: 110 km/h (68 mph)
- Traction system: Chopper control Variable frequency (GTO)
- Acceleration: 3.3 km/(h⋅s) (2.1 mph/s)
- Deceleration: 4.0 km/(h⋅s) (2.5 mph/s)
- Electric system: 1,500 V DC
- Current collection: Overhead catenary
- Track gauge: 1,435 mm (4 ft 8 1/2 in)

The Keisei 3600 series (京成3600形) is a commuter electric multiple unit (EMU) train type operated by the private railway operator Keisei Electric Railway in the Tokyo area of Japan since 1982. The trains were built to replace the former 210 and 700 series.

== Operation ==
The Keisei 3600 series can operate on all Keisei lines and through service onto the Toei Asakusa Line. This series, out of Keisei commuter trains, is the only type that can through service with the Asakusa Line but not onto the Keikyu Line.

== Formations ==
As of 1 April 2017, the fleet consists of five eight-car sets and one four-car set, formed as follows.

=== 8-car sets ===
The eight-car sets are formed as shown below, with six motored ("M") cars and two non-powered trailer ("T") cars, and car 1 at the northern end.

Car No.	1	2	3	4	5	6	7	8
Designation	Tc1	M1	M2	M1	M2	M1	M2	Tc2
Numbering	36x1	36x2	36x3	36x4	36x5	36x6	36x7	36x8

Cars 2 and 6 each have two scissors-type pantographs, while car 4 has one.

=== 4-car sets ===
The four-car set, 3668, is formed as shown below, with all four cars motored.

Car No.	1	2	3	4
Designation	M2c	M1	M2	M1c
Numbering	3661	3628	3621	3668

Cars 2 and 4 each have one scissors-type pantograph.

== Interior ==
Seating consists of longitudinal bench seating throughout.

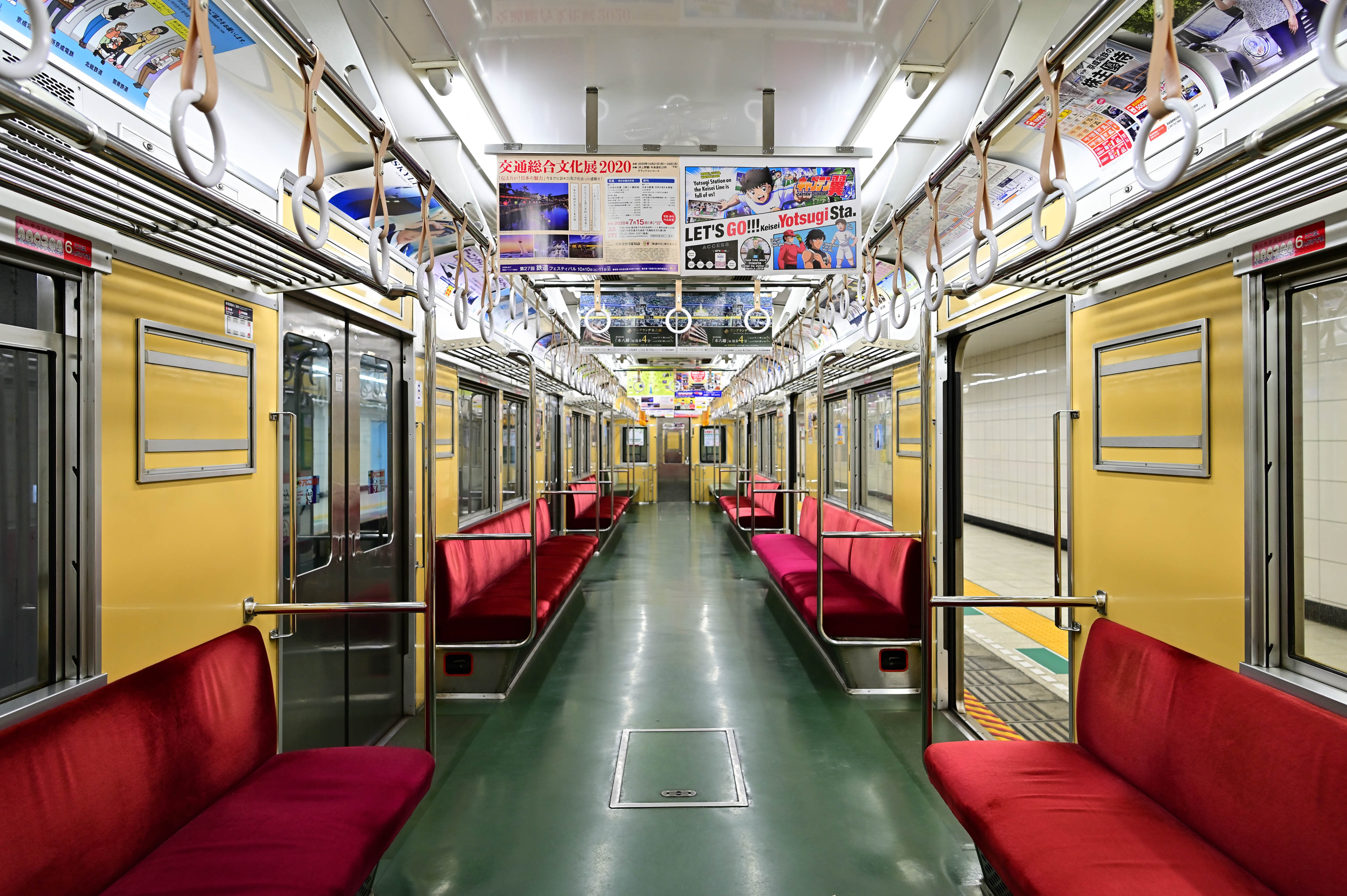
Interior view

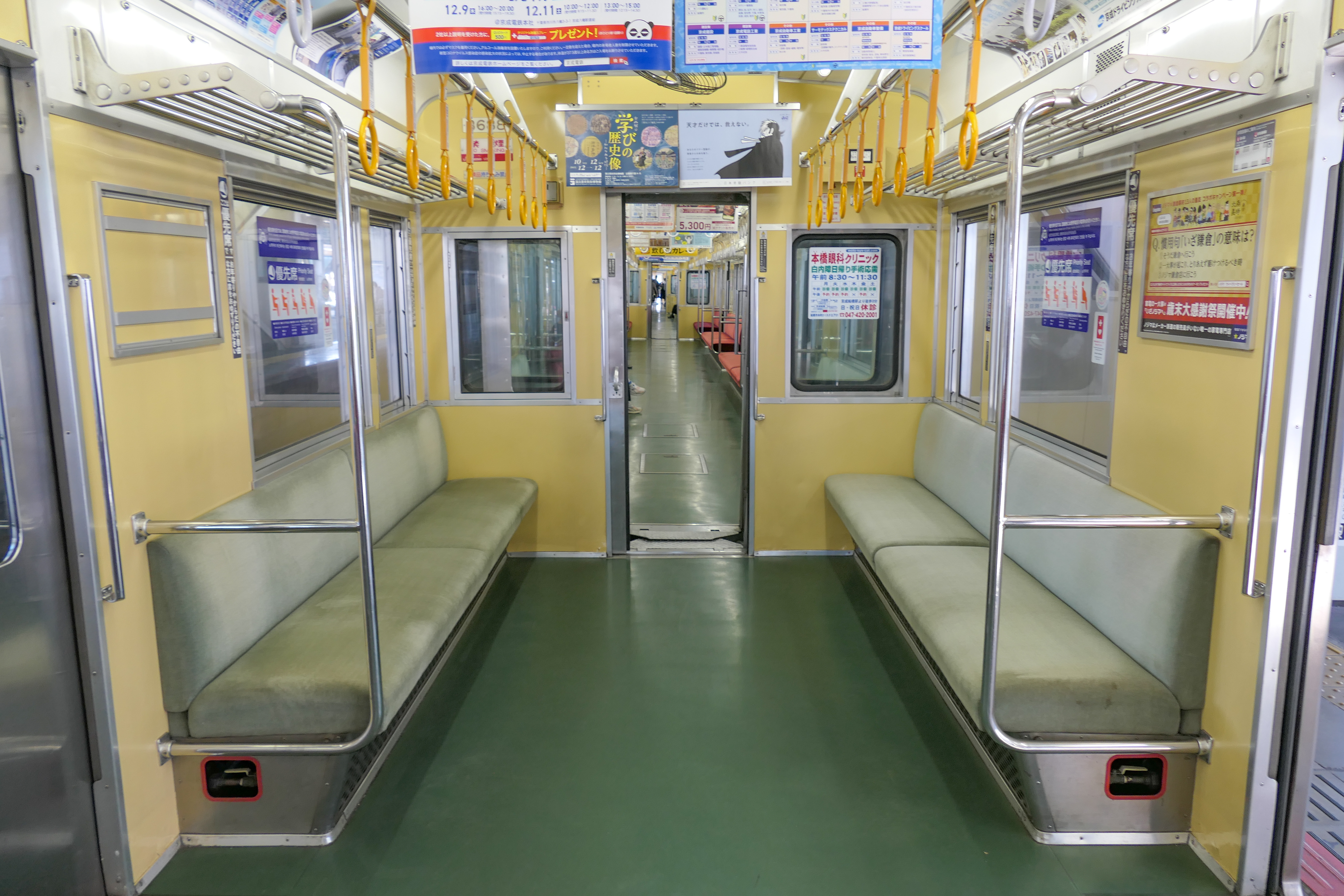
Priority seating

== History ==
Set 3608 was completed by Tokyu Car in June 1982. Commercial operation commenced on 17 July 1982. Initially, it was operated only within the Keisei Line, and did not operate on the Asakusa Line.

Designation	Tc	M1	M2	M1	M2	Tc
Numbering	36x1	36x2	36x3	36x6	36x7	36x8

The car body was adopted for the first time in Keisei as a lightweight all-stainless structure that was being put into practical use. Like the 3500 series, an orange band was placed above and below the front and side windows of the train, but from September 1992 to March 1993, it was formed in 3608 - 3638 formation bands of side window tops, changed from orange to blue. In September 1993, set 3648 changed the front and side window lower zone from orange to red and blue, and the change of the whole organization was completed by June 1995. Initially, the band of the side door part was omitted, but the band was affixed at the time of paint change. On the side door closing part there is a plate attached, with the notation of the writing style Keisei logo. In March 2001, along with the introduction of the Kei Group's CI, the K'SEI GROUP logo was affixed to all sides of all vehicles.

=== Field chopper sets ===
In June 1997, by interposing 3628 knitted intermediate electric vehicle units in 3638/3648 organization, the following 8-car fixed formation was constructed. At this time, the pantograph on the Narita end of Moha 3636 and Moha 3646 was removed.

Designation	Tc	M2	M1	M2	M1	M2	M1	Tc
Numbering	3638	3627	3626	3637	3636	3633	3632	3631
Numbering	3648	3623	3622	3647	3646	3643	3642	3641

In December 1998, by interposing 3668 organization intermediate electric motor units in sets 3678 and 3688, respectively, the following 8-car fixed formation was composed. At this time, the pantograph on the Narita side of Moha 3666 and Moha 3662 was removed.

Designation	Tc	M2	M1	M2	M1	M2	M1	Tc
Numbering	3678	3677	3676	3667	3666	3673	3672	3671
Numbering	3688	3687	3686	3663	3662	3683	3682	3681

In September 1999, by interposing 3608 knitted intermediate electric vehicle units in 3618/3658 formation, the following 8-car fixed formation was constructed. At this time, the pantograph on the Narita end of Moha 3606 and Moha 3602 was removed.

Designation	Tc	M2	M1	M2	M1	M2	M1	Tc
Numbering	3618	3617	3616	3607	3606	3613	3612	3611
Numbering	3658	3657	3656	3603	3602	3653	3652	3651

In September 2000, set 3648 near the Keisei Main Line Onigoshi station encountered a collision accident with a car at a railroad crossing, and the Moha 3643 - Moha 3642 unit was set aside for restoration work. After that, it returned to the March 2001 design and was restored to the original 8 fixed form, and marketing operations were started with the following provisional 6 fixed formations. The pantograph was mounted at the same place as the previous Moha 3646 only at the time of provisional formation.

Designation	Tc	M2	M1	M2	M1	Tc
Numbering	3648	3623	3622	3647	3646	3641

=== VVVF inverter control sets ===
In February 1999, Kuha 3621, Kuha 3628, Kuha 3661, Kuha 3668, which had been treated as idle cars, became electric vehicles, and the operation was temporarily restarted by organizing the following four-car train formation. It was also operated on the Kanamachi Line because it is a 4-car formation.

Designation	M2c	M1	M2	M1c
Numbering	3668	3621	3628	3661

In August 1999, cars Kuha 3601 and Kuha 3608 were converted into an intermediate car after being incorporated into set 3668, forming the following six-car formation.

Designation	M2c	M1	T	T	M2	M1c
Numbering	3668	3621	3608	3601	3628	3661

Car 3608 is equipped with a pantograph.

=== Shibayama Railway ===
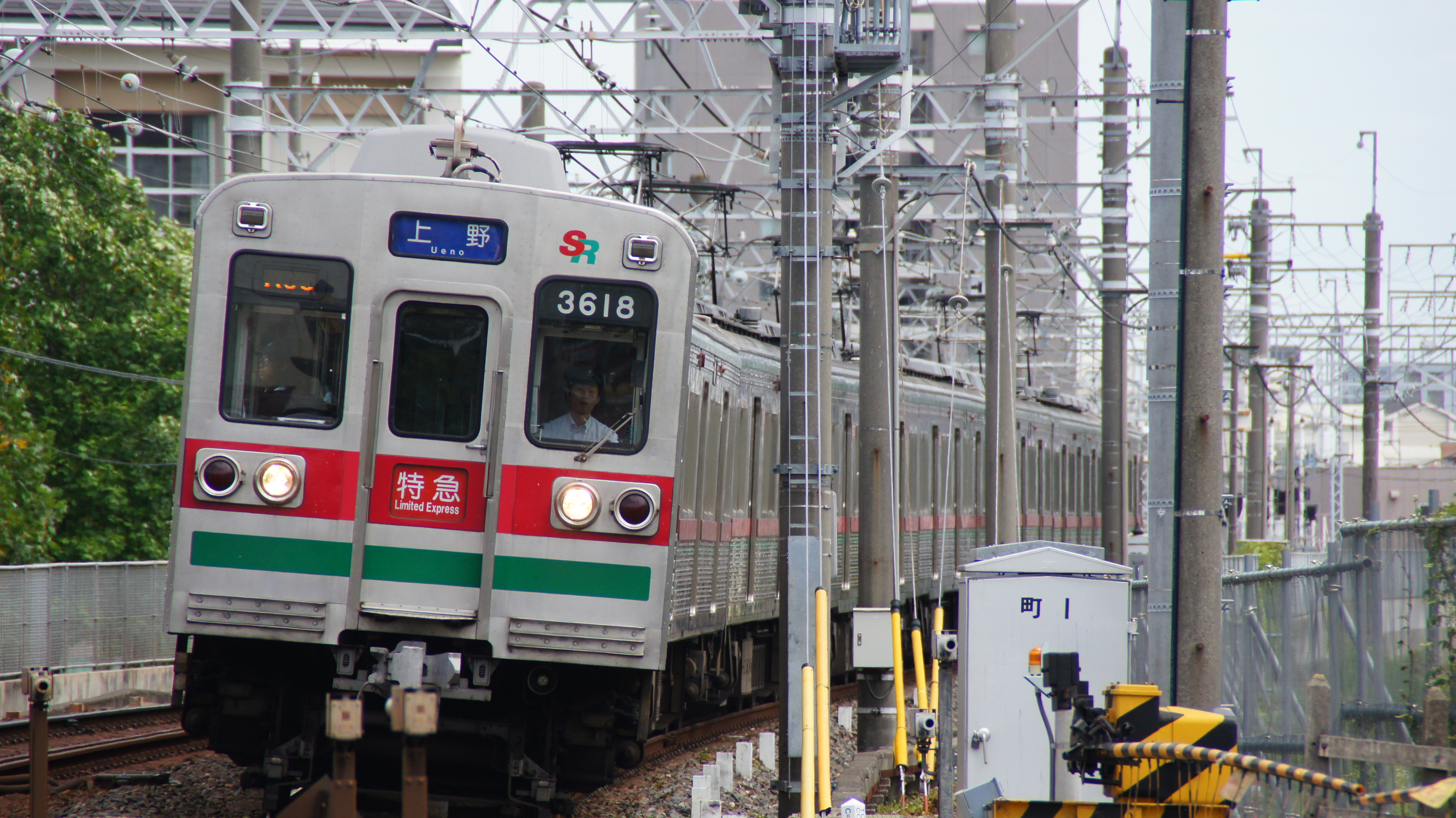
Shibayama 3600 series in July 2011

Eight-car set 3618 was leased to Shibayama Railway with its opening in October 2002. It was replaced with a Keisei 3500 series set in 2013.

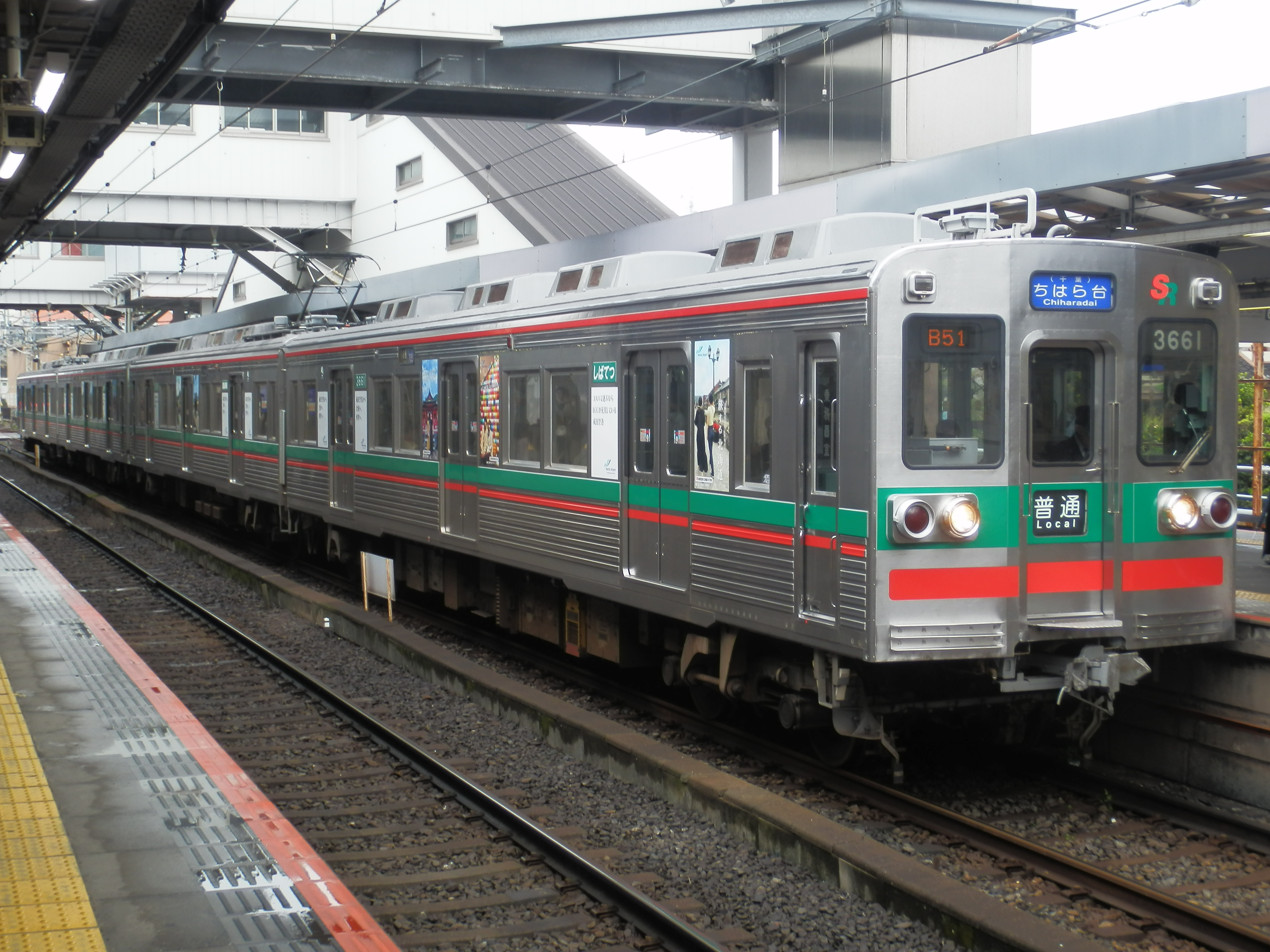
Shibayama 3600 series set 3668 in April 2026

On 13 March 2026, Shibayama Railway announced that it would lease 3600 series four-car set 3668 to replace its 3500 series set. It was scheduled to enter revenue service on 1 April of that year.

== Livery variations ==
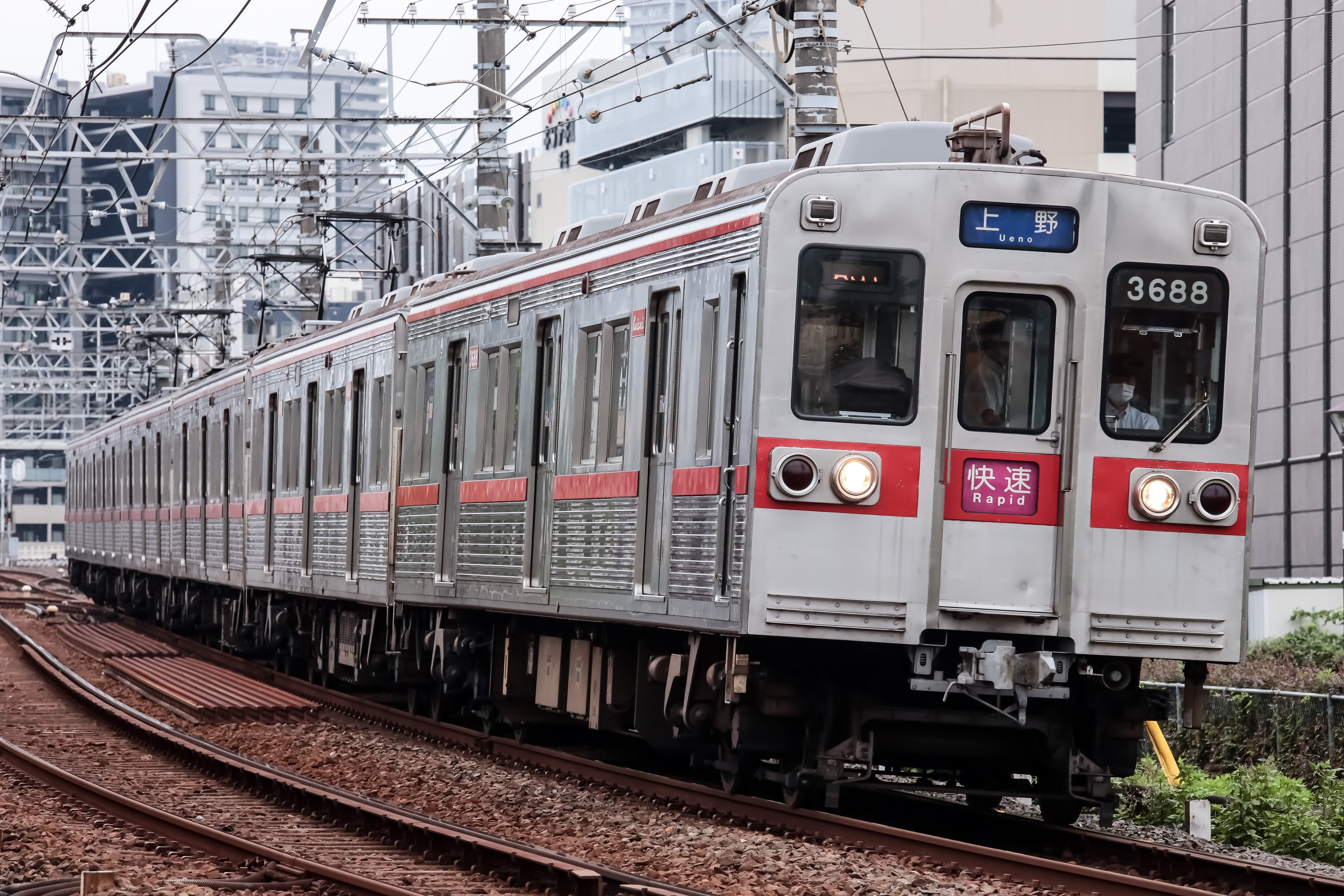
Set 3688 in "fire orange" livery

In summer 2020, set 3688 was given a vintage livery with a fire orange band.

== Withdrawals ==
In February 2017, set 3618 and two cars from set 3668 (cars 3608 and 3601) were withdrawn. As a result, set 3668 became a four-car set. Two sets remain in service as of May 2024: four-car set 3668 and six-car set 3688.
