= Shibayama-Chiyoda Station =

Railway station in Shibayama, Chiba Prefecture, Japan

SR01 Shibayama-Chiyoda Station 芝山千代田駅
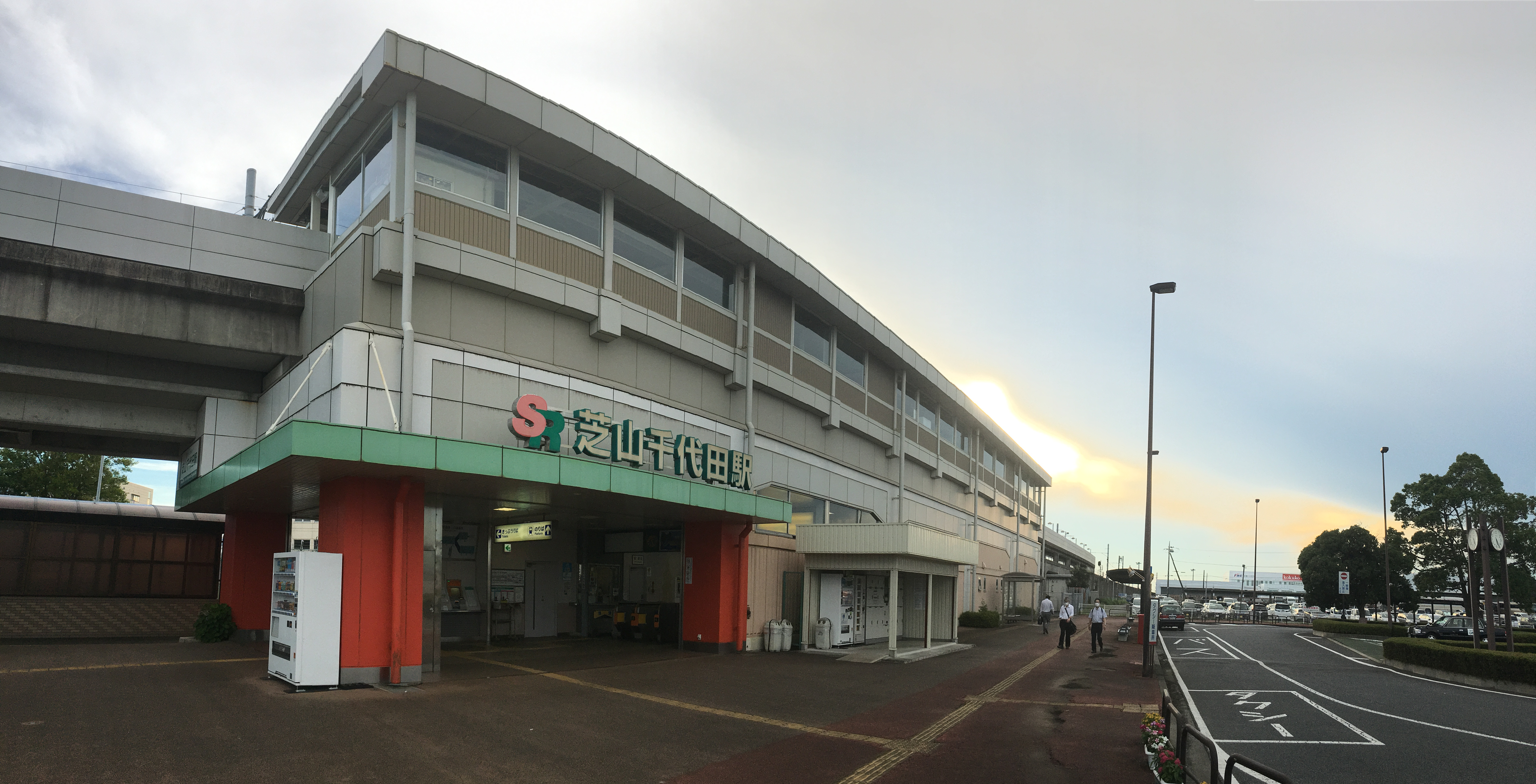
- Shibayama-Chiyoda Station in July 2021

General information
- Location: Kayamashinden; Shibayama, Chiba; Japan
- Coordinates: 35°45′14″N 140°24′00″E
- Operator: Shibayama Railway
- Platforms: 1 side platform
- Tracks: 1

Other information
- Station code: SR01
- Website: Official website

History
- Opened: 27 October 2002

Passengers
- FY 2019: 1,435

Services
Preceding station	Shibayama Railway	Following station
Higashi-Narita KS44 Terminus	Shibayama Railway Line	Terminus
Route map
Location
- Location within Chiba Prefecture Location within Japan

Shibayama-Chiyoda Station (Japanese: 芝山千代田駅, Hepburn: Shibayama-Chiyoda-eki) is a passenger railway station in the town of Shibayama, Chiba Prefecture, Japan, operated by the private railway operator Shibayama Railway. It is situated on the eastern boundary of Narita International Airport.

== Lines ==
Shibayama-Chiyoda Station is served by the 2.2 km (1.4 mi) Shibayama Railway Line from Higashi-Narita, with through services to and from Keisei Narita via the Keisei Higashi-Narita Line during the daytime and some through services to and from Keisei Ueno in Tokyo via the Keisei Main Line during the morning and evening peaks.

== Station layout ==
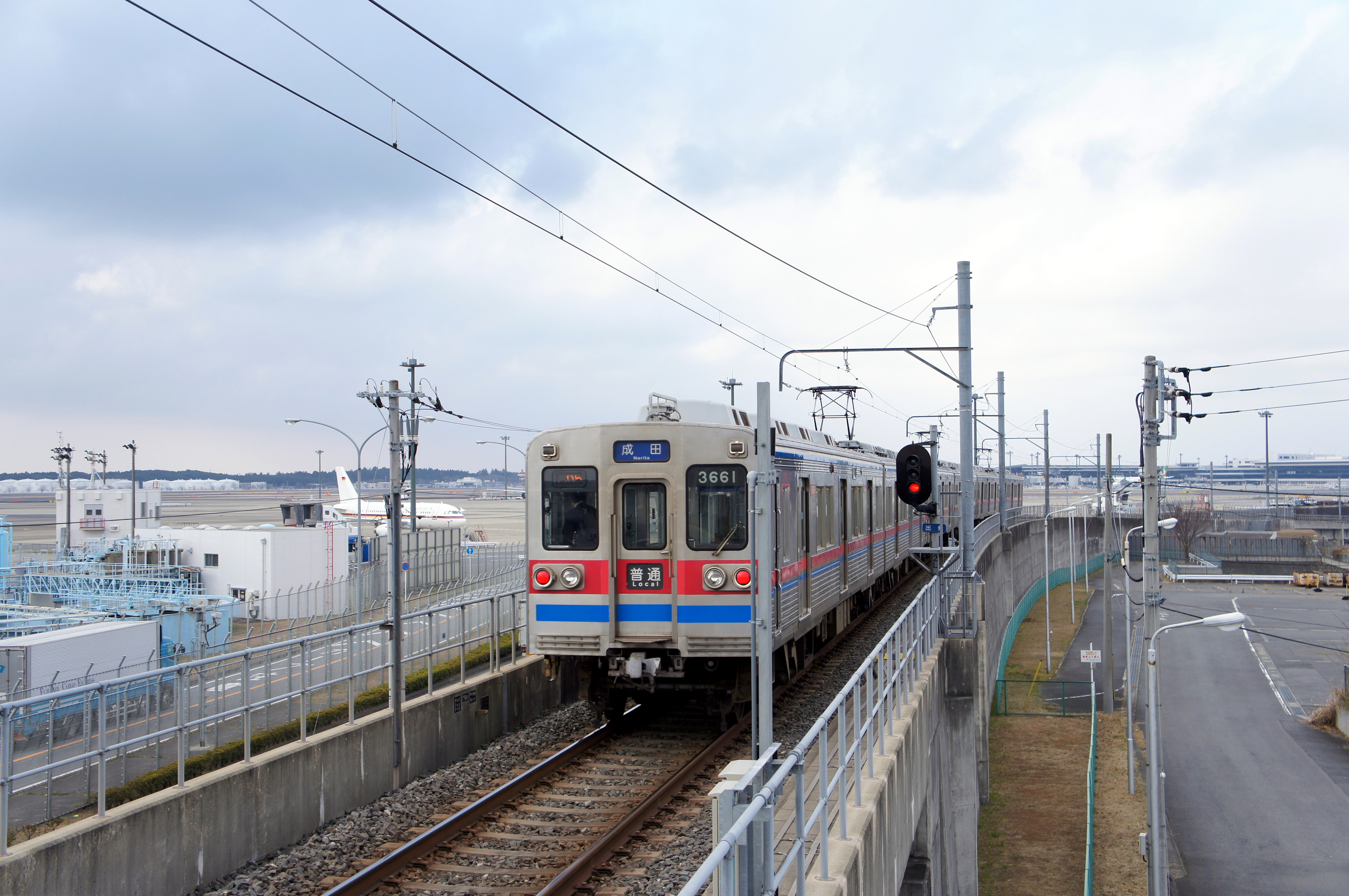
A Keisei train leaving the station in January 2012

The station has one elevated platform serving a single-track line.

== History ==
The station opened on 27 October 2002.

== Passenger statistics ==
In fiscal 2019, the station was used by an average of 1,435 passengers daily.

== Surrounding area ==
Shibayama-Chiyoda Station is located near Gate No. 6 to Narita Airport, which serves the South Cargo Area and the Japan Airlines and All Nippon Airways aircraft maintenance facilities. It is also the closest railway station to the Museum of Aeronautical Sciences, five minutes away by shuttle bus.

== See also ==
- List of railway stations in Japan
