= Higashi-Narita Station =

Railway station in Narita, Chiba Prefecture, Japan

KS44 Higashi-Narita Station 東成田駅
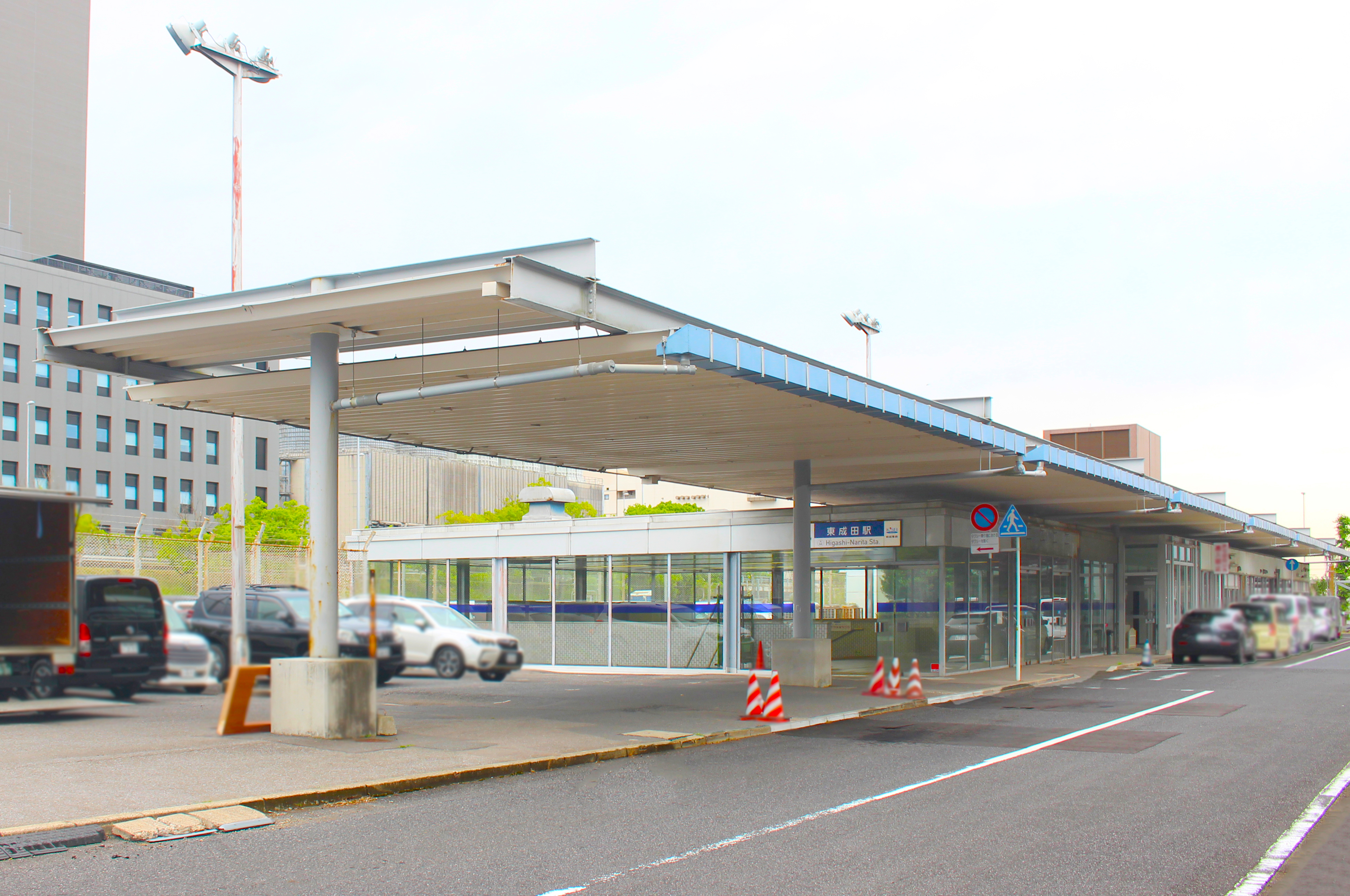
- Higashi-Narita Station in 2024

General information
- Other names: Narita Airport Station (成田空港駅, Narita Kūkō-eki) (until 1991)
- Location: 124 Komae; Narita, Chiba; Japan
- Coordinates: 35°46′11″N 140°23′14″E
- Operator: Keisei Electric Railway; Shibayama Railway
- Distance: 7.4 km (4.6 mi) from Keisei Narita
- Platforms: 2 island platforms (1 in use)
- Tracks: 4 (2 in use)

Construction
- Structure type: Underground

Other information
- Station code: KS44
- Website: Official website

History
- Opened: 21 May 1978

Passengers
- FY2025: 2,186 daily

Services
| Preceding station | Keisei | Following station |
|---|---|---|
| Keisei Narita KS40 Terminus | Higashi-Narita Line | through to Shibayama Railway Line |
| Preceding station | Shibayama Railway | Following station |
| through to Keisei Higashi-Narita Line | Shibayama Railway Line | Shibayama-Chiyoda SR01 Terminus |
Route map
Location
- Location within Chiba Prefecture

Higashi-Narita Station (Japanese: 東成田駅, Hepburn: Higashi-Narita-eki; lit. 'East Narita Station'), formerly known as Narita Airport Station (成田空港駅, Narita Kūkō-eki) until 1991, is a passenger railway station in the city of Narita, Chiba, Japan, operated jointly by the private railway operator Keisei Electric Railway, and the third-sector railway Shibayama Railway.

== Lines ==
Higashi-Narita Station is served by the Keisei Higashi-Narita Line from Keisei Narita, with some morning and evening peak through services to and from Keisei Ueno in Tokyo via the Keisei Main Line. Higashi-Narita Station lies 7.4 km (4.6 mi) from the starting point of the Keisei Higashi-Narita Line at Keisei Narita. It is also served by the 2.2 km (1.4 mi) Shibayama Railway Line to Shibayama-Chiyoda Station.

== Station layout ==
The station is an underground station with an island platform serving two tracks. It is equidistant from the two stations serving Terminal 1 and Terminals 2 and 3 of Narita International Airport, and can be accessed by a 500-metre (1,600 ft) underground walkway to the latter station.

=== Platforms ===
| 1 | Keisei Higashi-Narita Line | for Keisei Narita and Keisei Ueno |
| 2 | Shibayama Railway Line | for Shibayama-Chiyoda |
| 3 | ■ | not used |
| 4 | ■ | not used |

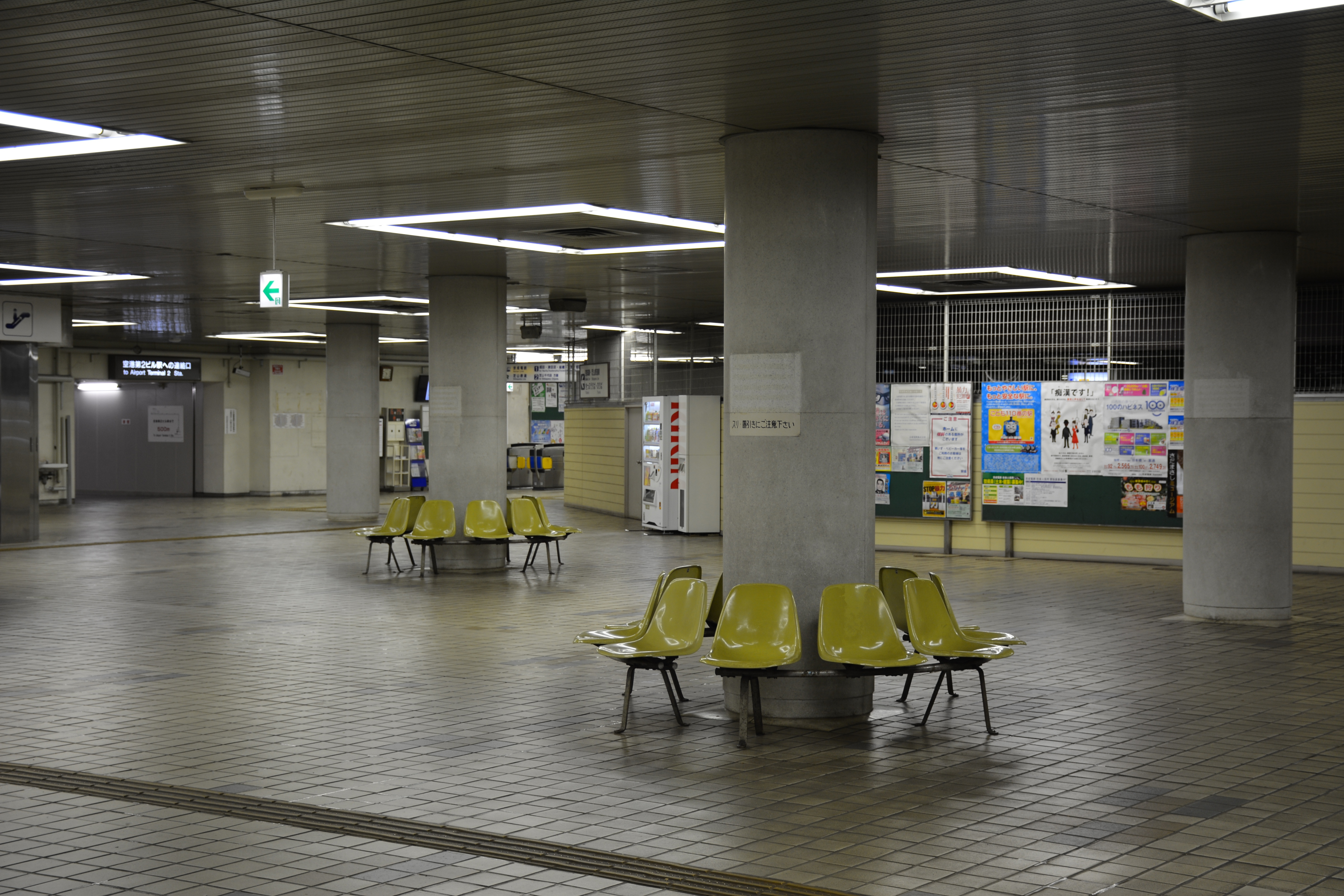
The station concourse in June 2015. The yellow wall is a semi-permanent barrier that blocks off the former lobby and stairs to the unused platform.

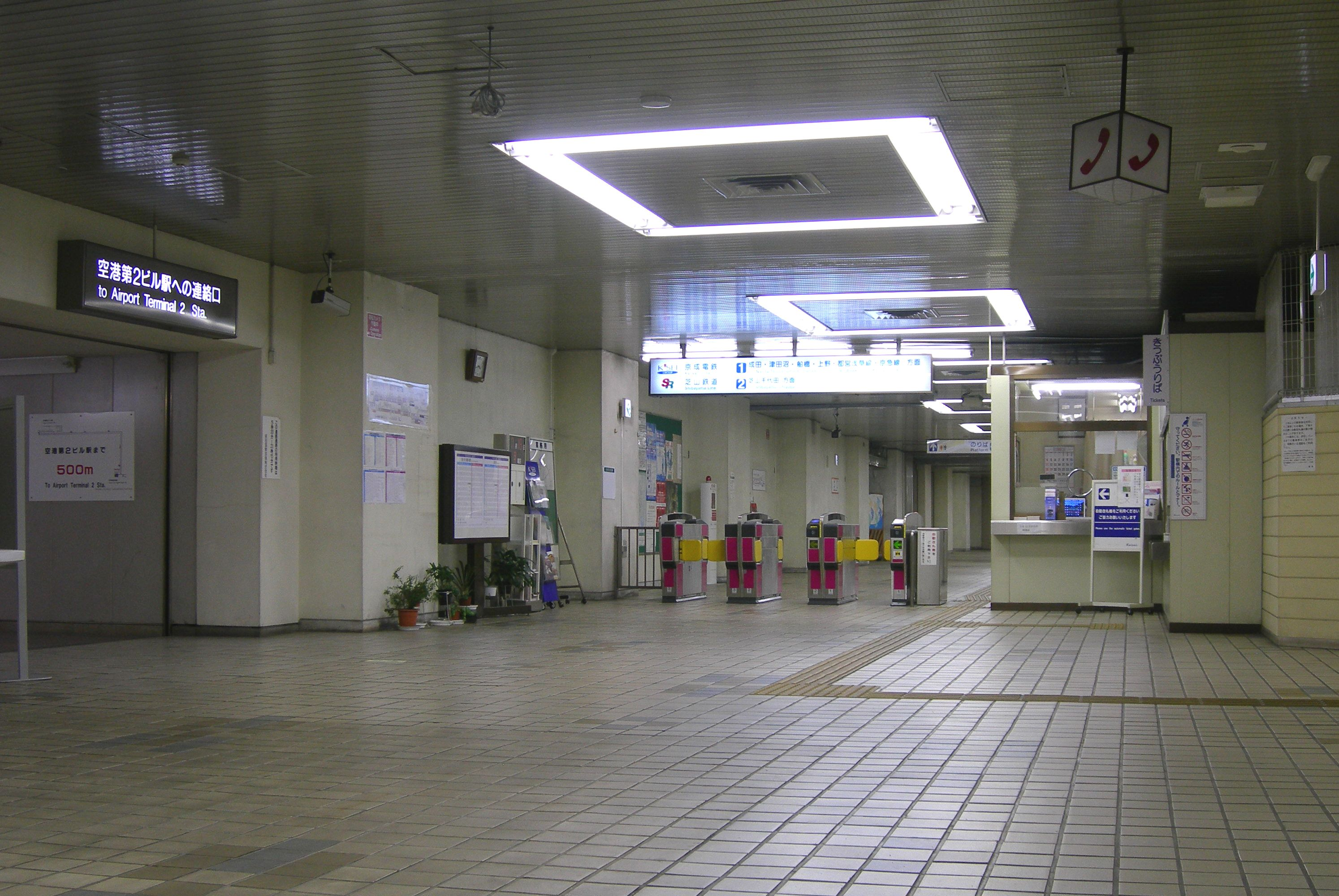
The ticket barriers in July 2010

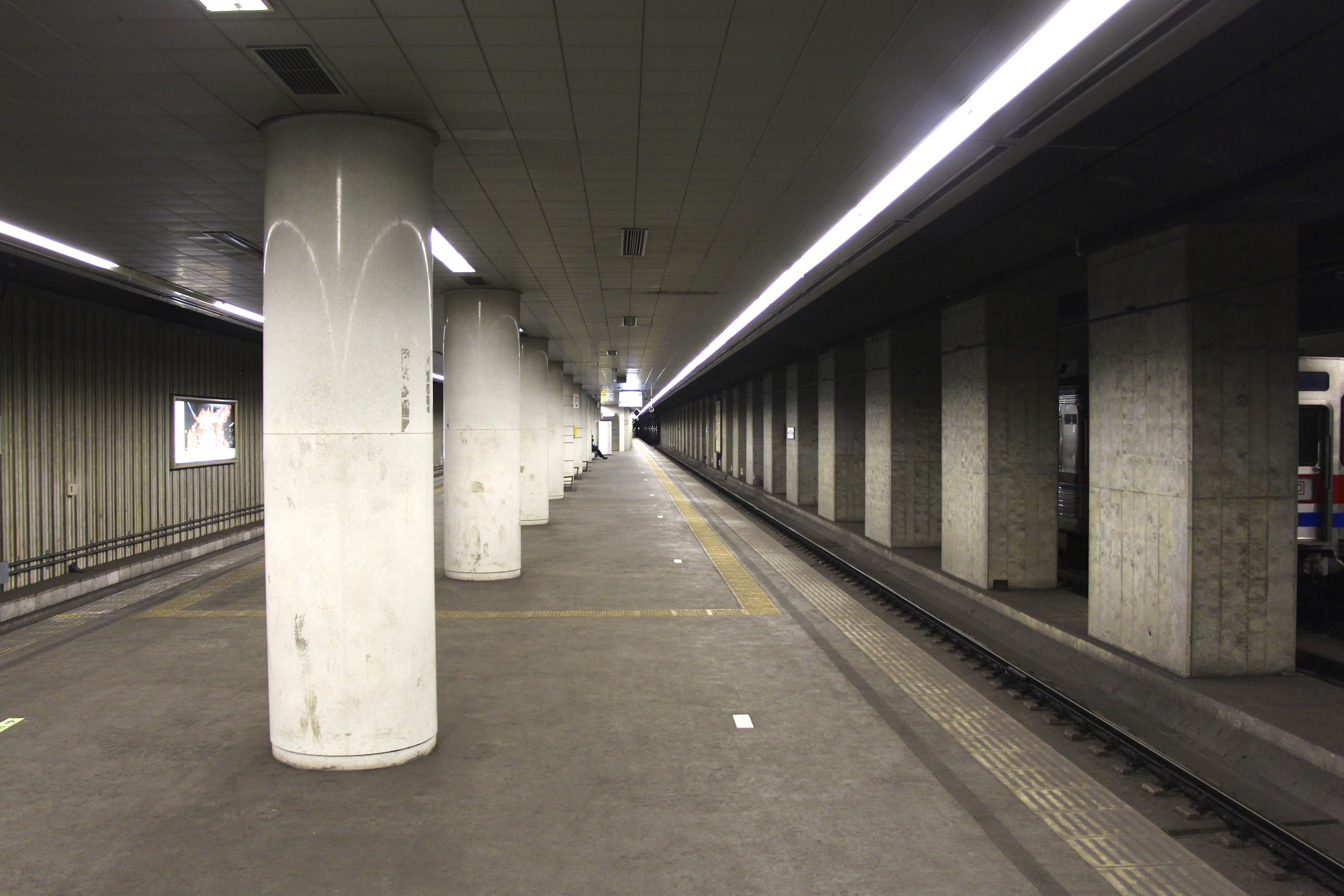
The platforms in December 2012. Note the train at the right, parked at the unused platform.

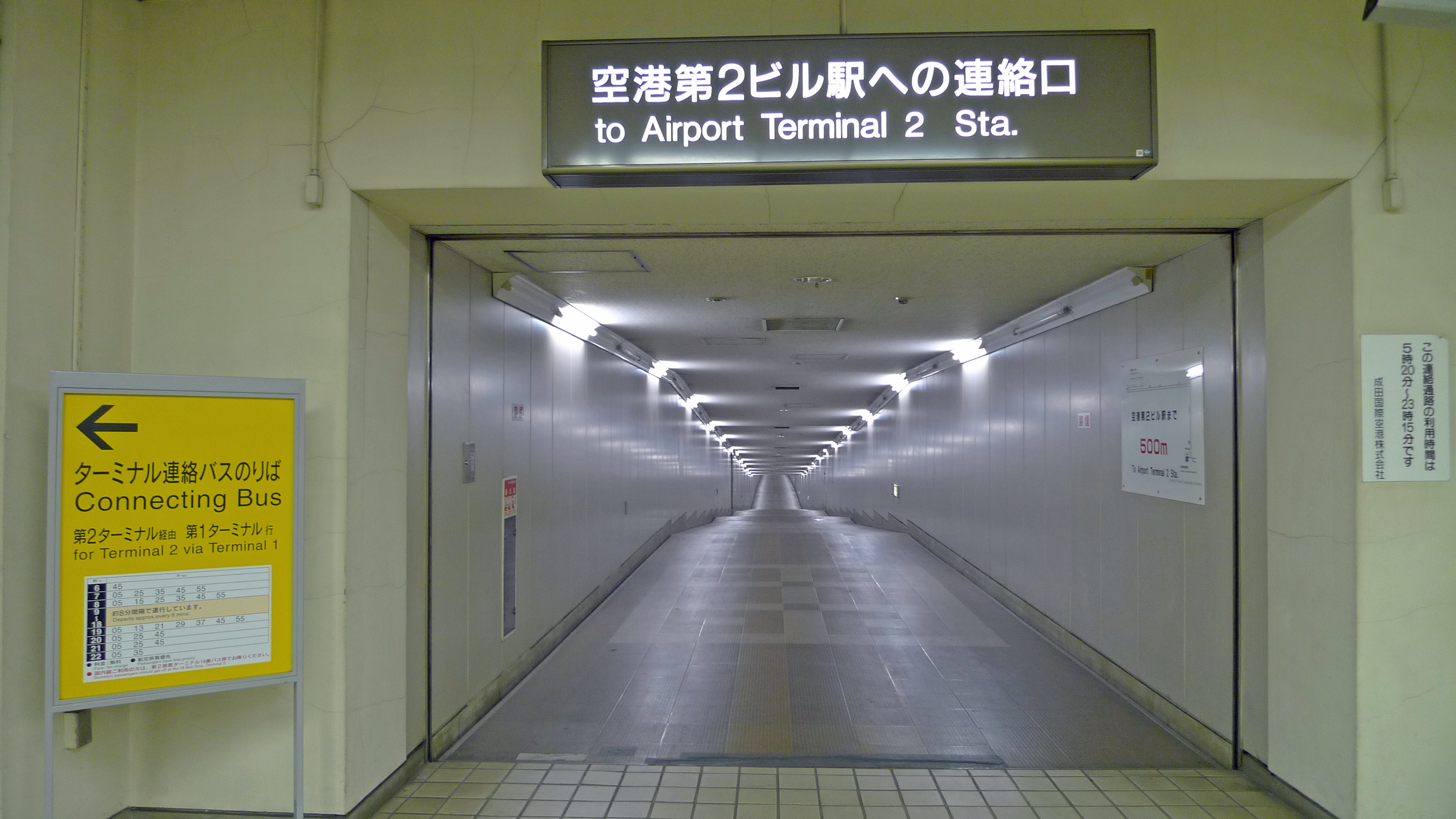
The passageway to Terminal 2 in May 2011

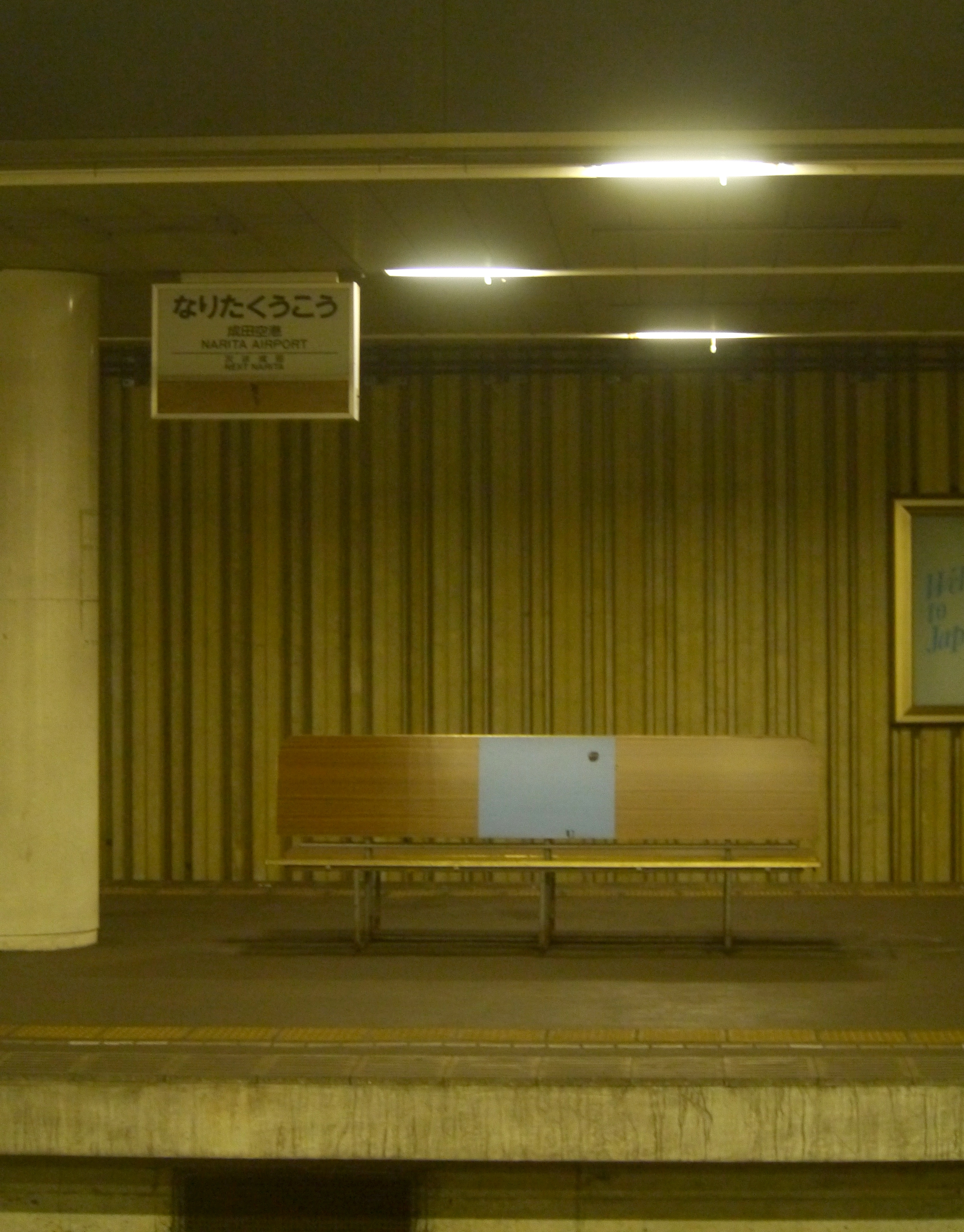
Platform of the former Narita Airport Station

== History ==
During construction of Narita International Airport, Keisei Electric Railway sought permission to construct a railway connection to the airport, whose route was near the company's existing main line. However, space beneath the passenger terminal had been reserved for the planned Narita Shinkansen, which resulted in Keisei's station being built approximately 800 metres (0.50 mi) from the terminal. Passengers initially had to walk between the station and terminal or use a shuttle bus for an additional fare.

The station opened on May 21, 1978, as Narita Airport Station (成田空港駅, Narita Kūkō-eki), the day after the airport. It was constructed as an underground station with two island platforms serving four tracks.

Construction of the Narita Shinkansen was subsequently abandoned following opposition to the project. Keisei was permitted to reuse some of its infrastructure to extend its railway to the terminal. On March 21, 1991, Keisei's main line and Skyliner services were rerouted to a new Narita Airport Station (now Narita Airport Terminal 1 Station) beneath Terminal 1. A second station, Narita Airport Terminal 2·3 Station, opened in 1992 to serve the airport's newly opened Terminal 2. A 500-metre (1,600 ft) tunnel connects Higashi-Narita Station with Narita Airport Terminal 2·3 Station.

The former Narita Airport Station was renamed Higashi-Narita Station and became part of the Keisei Higashi-Narita Line. At Higashi-Narita, portions of the former station concourse, including several retail spaces, have been closed off. The island platform formerly used by Skyliner services is no longer accessible to passengers, and its tracks are used for storing out-of-service trains.

The Shibayama Railway Line began service from Higashi-Narita Station in October 2002.

Station numbering was introduced on the Keisei network on July 17, 2010, with Higashi-Narita assigned the station number KS44.

== Passenger statistics ==
In fiscal 2019, the station was used by an average of 1,796 passengers daily (boarding passengers only).

== Buses ==
Name
Shuttle
Via
Narita Airport Terminal 2·3
Terminus
Narita Airport Terminal 1
Operator
Narita Airport Transport
Notes
- Fare-free
- Operates every 5 minutes

== Surrounding area ==
- Chiba Narita International Airport Police Station
- Narita Airport Rest House (Hotel)
- JAL Ground Service (Japan Airlines ground handling company)

== In popular culture ==
The station has been used as the backdrop for many music videos, most prominently, hitorie's 2019 song "Sleepwalk", Tatsuya Kitani's "When the Weak go Marching In", and King Gnu's "Specialz."

== See also ==
- List of railway stations in Japan
