= Keisei Higashi-Narita Line =

Railway line in Chiba Prefecture, Japan

Coordinates: 35°46′28″N 140°22′55″E

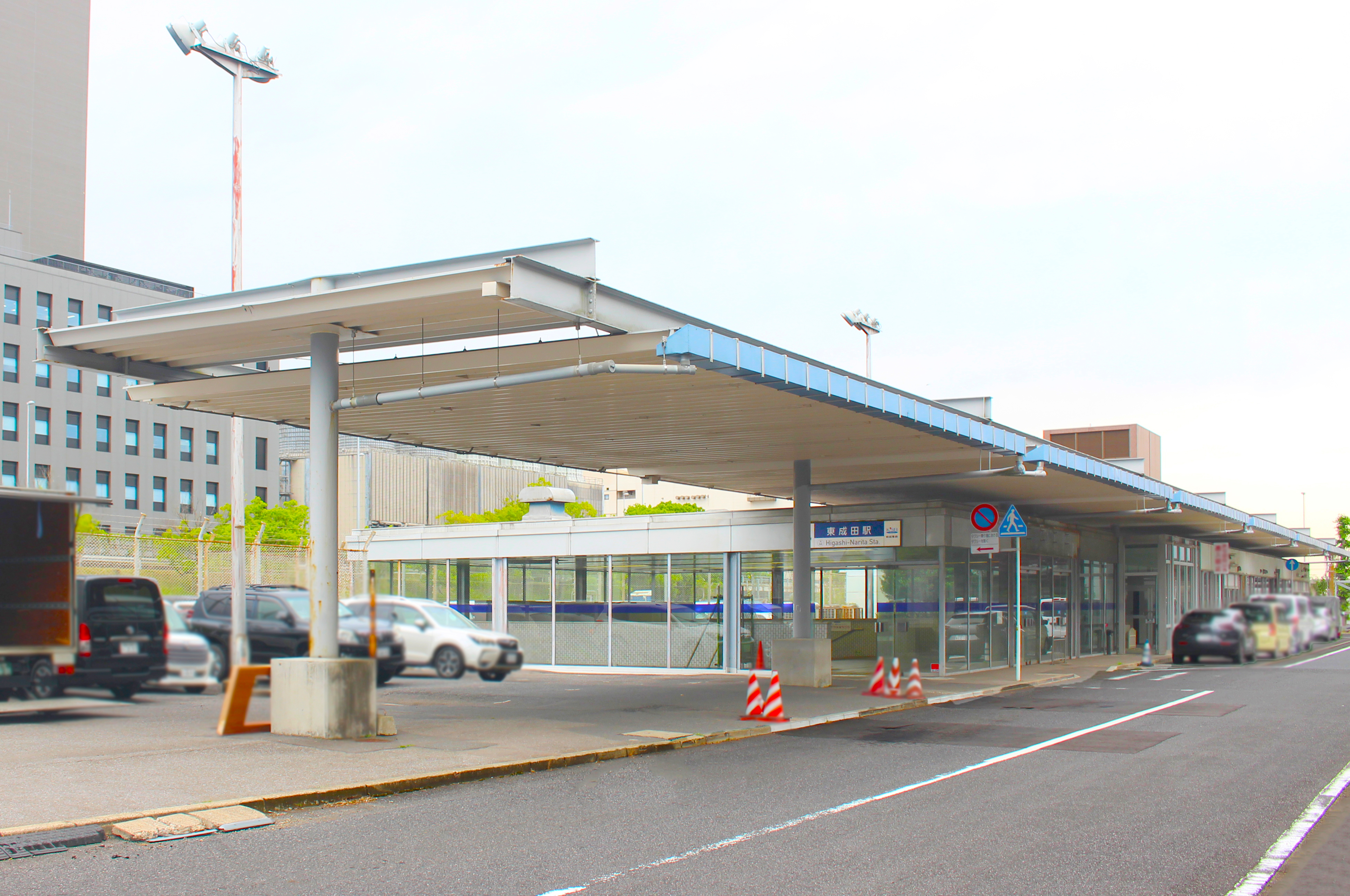
- Higashi-Narita Station in 2024

Overview
- Owner: Keisei Electric Railway
- Locale: Narita City, Chiba Prefecture
- Termini: Keisei Narita; Higashi-Narita
- Stations: 2

History
- Opened: 21 May 1978; 48 years ago

Technical
- Line length: 7.1 km (4.4 mi)
- Number of tracks: 2
- Track gauge: 1,435 mm (4 ft 8 1/2 in) standard gauge
- Minimum radius: 360 m (1,180 ft)
- Electrification: Overhead line, 1,500 V DC
- Operating speed: 105 km/h (65 mph)
- Signalling: Automatic closed block
- Train protection system: C-ATS
- Maximum incline: 2.5%

The Keisei Higashi-Narita Line (Note: Japanese: 京成東成田線, Hepburn: Keisei Higashi Narita-sen) is a 7.1-kilometre (4.4 mi) branch line in Chiba Prefecture, Japan, operated by the private railway operator Keisei Electric Railway. It branches from the Keisei Main Line at Keisei Narita Station and runs to Higashi-Narita Station, the former Narita Airport Station. The Shibayama Railway Line continues from Higashi-Narita to Shibayama-Chiyoda Station and operates as an extension of the Higashi-Narita Line, with through services between Shibayama-Chiyoda and Keisei Narita.

At Keisei Narita, passengers can transfer to the Keisei Main Line and JR East's Narita Line, both of which provide services toward Tokyo.

== Stations ==
No.	Station	Distance in km (mi)	Transfers	Location
KS40	Keisei Narita 京成成田	0.0 (0)	Keisei Main Line; ■ Narita Line (Narita: JO35)	Narita, Chiba
KS44	Higashi-Narita 東成田	7.1 (4.4)	Shibayama Railway Line (through service)	Narita, Chiba
↓ Through-running to/from Shibayama-Chiyoda via Shibayama Railway Line ↓

== History ==
The line opened on May 21, 1978, as a 7.7-kilometre (4.8 mi) extension of Keisei Electric Railway's Main Line to Narita International Airport, which had opened the previous day.

During construction of the airport, Keisei sought permission to construct a railway connection to the airport, whose site was near the company's existing Main Line. However, space beneath the passenger terminal had been reserved for the planned Narita Shinkansen, resulting in Keisei's station being built approximately 800 metres (0.50 mi) from the terminal. Passengers initially had to walk between the station and terminal or use a shuttle bus for an additional fare.

Construction of the Narita Shinkansen was subsequently abandoned following opposition to the project. Keisei and the East Japan Railway Company were later permitted to use portions of the partially constructed infrastructure for direct rail access to the airport. On March 21, 1991, a new Narita Airport Station opened beneath Terminal 1. The former Narita Airport Station was renamed Higashi-Narita Station, and the route between Keisei Narita Station and Higashi-Narita, which had become a branch of the Main Line, was designated the Keisei Higashi-Narita Line.

Following the opening of direct rail service to the terminals, Higashi-Narita lost most of its role as an airport passenger station. The opening of Narita Airport Terminal 2·3 Station in 1992 further reduced its importance.

In the 1980s, the Shibayama Railway was established to provide a rail connection for residents of Shibayama, whose transportation links with Narita and areas to the west had been disrupted by the construction of the airport. The railway was developed in part to appease local residents during the airport's subsequent expansion, following decades of opposition to the airport's construction. The Shibayama Railway initially planned to operate smaller trains solely on its own line, but local residents requested standard-sized trains to allow for through service to Tokyo via the Keisei network. Permission for the use of standard-sized trains was granted in 1990, and the company subsequently received approval for through service to Keisei Narita Station via Higashi-Narita.

Construction of the Shibayama Railway Line began in 1998 but was heavily delayed by difficulties acquiring land. The line opened on October 27, 2002, with a single station at Shibayama-Chiyoda Station southeast of the airport. It operates as an extension of the Higashi-Narita Line, with trains continuing through to Keisei Narita and, during peak periods, to destinations in Tokyo.
