= Keisei Narita Station =

Railway station in Narita, Chiba Prefecture, Japan

KS40 Keisei Narita Station 京成成田駅
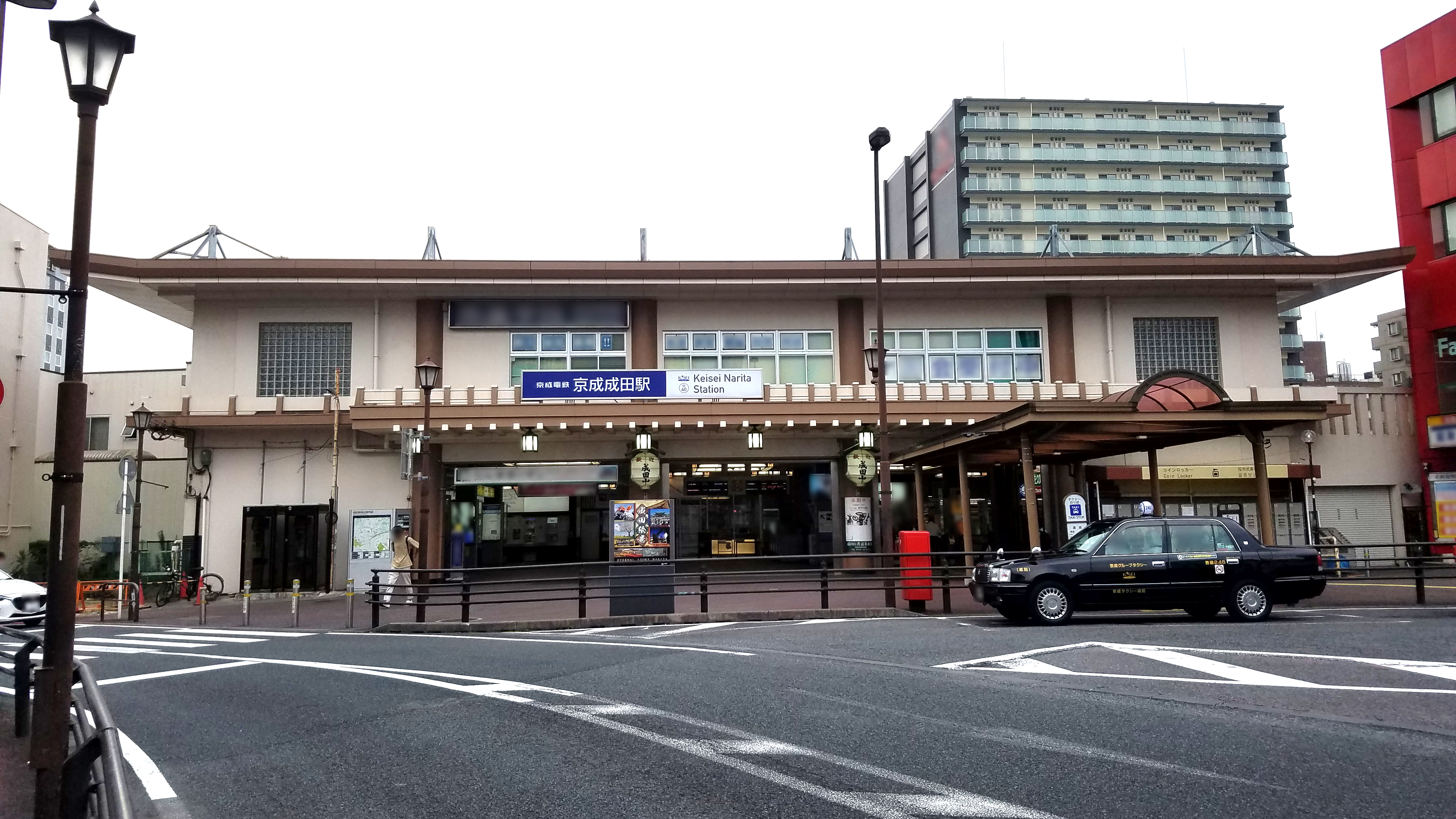
- Keisei Narita Station, August 2020

General information
- Location: 814 Hanazaki-cho; Narita, Chiba; Japan
- Coordinates: 35°46′36″N 140°18′56″E
- Operator: Keisei Electric Railway
- Lines: Keisei Main Line; Keisei Higashi-Narita Line
- Distance: 61.2 km (38.0 mi) from Keisei Ueno
- Platforms: 2 island platforms; 1 side platform

Other information
- Station code: KS40
- Website: Official website

History
- Opened: 25 April 1930
- Former names: Narita (until 1931)

Passengers
- FY2025: 37,914 daily

Services
Preceding station	Keisei	Following station
Keisei Sakura KS35 towards Keisei Ueno	Morningliner; Eveningliner	Narita Airport Terminal 2·3 KS41 towards Narita Airport Terminal 1
Keisei Sakura KS35 towards Keisei Ueno	Main Line Rapid Limited Express	Narita Airport Terminal 2·3 KS41 towards Narita Airport Terminal 1
Kōzunomori KS39 towards Keisei Ueno	Main Line Limited Express Commuter Express Rapid Local	Narita Airport Terminal 2·3 KS41 towards Narita Airport Terminal 1
Terminus	Higashi-Narita Line	Higashi-Narita KS44 Terminus
Route map
Location
- Location within Chiba Prefecture Location within Japan

Keisei Narita Station (Japanese: 京成成田駅, Hepburn: Keisei Narita-eki) is a passenger railway station located in the city of Narita, Chiba Prefecture Japan, operated by the private railway company, Keisei Electric Railway. It is within walking distance of the JR East Narita Station.

== Lines ==
Keisei Narita Station is served by the Keisei Main Line and Keisei Higashi-Narita Line. It is 61.2 kilometres (38.0 mi) from the Tokyo terminus of the Keisei Main Line at Keisei Ueno Station.

== Station layout ==
The station consists of two island platforms and one side platform connected by underpasses. The elevated station building is adjacent to the side platform.

=== Platforms ===
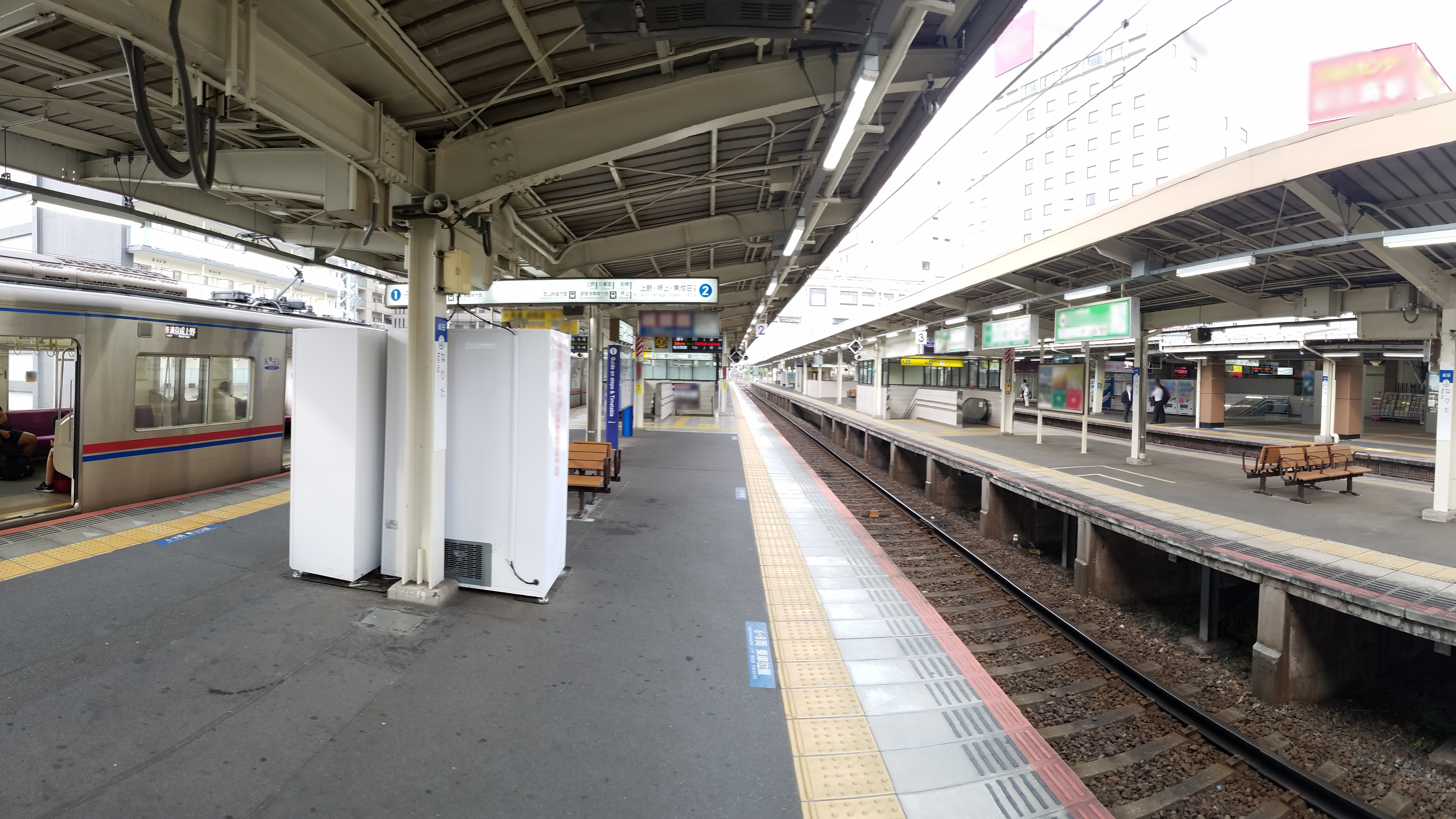
The platforms

1	Keisei Main Line	for Keisei Funabashi, Aoto, Nippori, Keisei Ueno, and Oshiage
2	Keisei Main Line	for Keisei Funabashi, Aoto, Nippori, Keisei Ueno, and Oshiage
2	Keisei Higashi-Narita Line	for Higashi-Narita and Shibayama-Chiyoda
3	Keisei Main Line	Morningliner for Keisei Funabashi, Aoto, Nippori, and Keisei Ueno
4	Keisei Main Line	(terminating trains only)
5	Keisei Main Line	for Narita Airport (Terminal 2·3 and Terminal 1)
5	Keisei Higashi-Narita Line	for Higashi-Narita and Shibayama-Chiyoda

== History ==
Keisei Narita Station opened on 25 April 1930, as Narita Station (成田駅). It was renamed Keisei Narita on 18 November 1931.

Station numbering was introduced to all Keisei Line stations on 17 July 2010; Keisei Narita Station was assigned station number KS40.

== Surrounding area ==
- Narita Station (JR East Narita Line)
- Narita-san
- Narita City Hall

== See also ==
- List of railway stations in Japan
