= Togoshi Station =

Metro station in Tokyo, Japan

Coordinates: 35.6147°N 139.7164°E

Togoshi Station 戸越駅

- Station exit, 2026

Japanese name
- Shinjitai: 戸越駅
- Kyūjitai: 戶越驛
- Hiragana: とごしえき

General information
- Location: 3-4-17 Togoshi, Shinagawa City, Tokyo; Japan
- Operator: Toei Subway
- Line: Asakusa Line
- Platforms: 1 island platform
- Tracks: 2

Construction
- Structure type: Underground

Other information
- Station code: A-04

History
- Opened: 15 November 1968; 57 years ago

Services
Preceding station	Toei Subway	Following station
Nakanobu towards Nishi-magome	Asakusa Line	Gotanda towards Oshiage
Location
- Location within Tokyo Yamanote Loop Location within Tokyo wards area Location within Japan

Togoshi Station (戸越駅, Togoshi-eki) is a subway station on the Toei Asakusa Line, operated by the Tokyo Metropolitan Bureau of Transportation. It is located in Shinagawa, Tokyo, Japan. Its number is A-04.

== Station layout ==
Togoshi Station is composed of a singular island platform serving two tracks. Platform 1 is for passengers traveling toward Nishi-magome, whereas Platform 2 serves those heading toward Sengakuji and Oshiage.

=== Platforms ===
1	Asakusa Line	for Nishi-magome
2	Asakusa Line	for Sengakuji, Nihombashi, and Oshiage; Keisei Main Line for Aoto, Keisei Takasago, Keisei Sakura, Keisei Narita, and Narita Airport (Terminal 2·3 and Terminal 1); Hokusō Line for Imba Nihon-idai; Narita Sky Access Line for Narita Airport; Shibayama Railway Line for Shibayama-Chiyoda

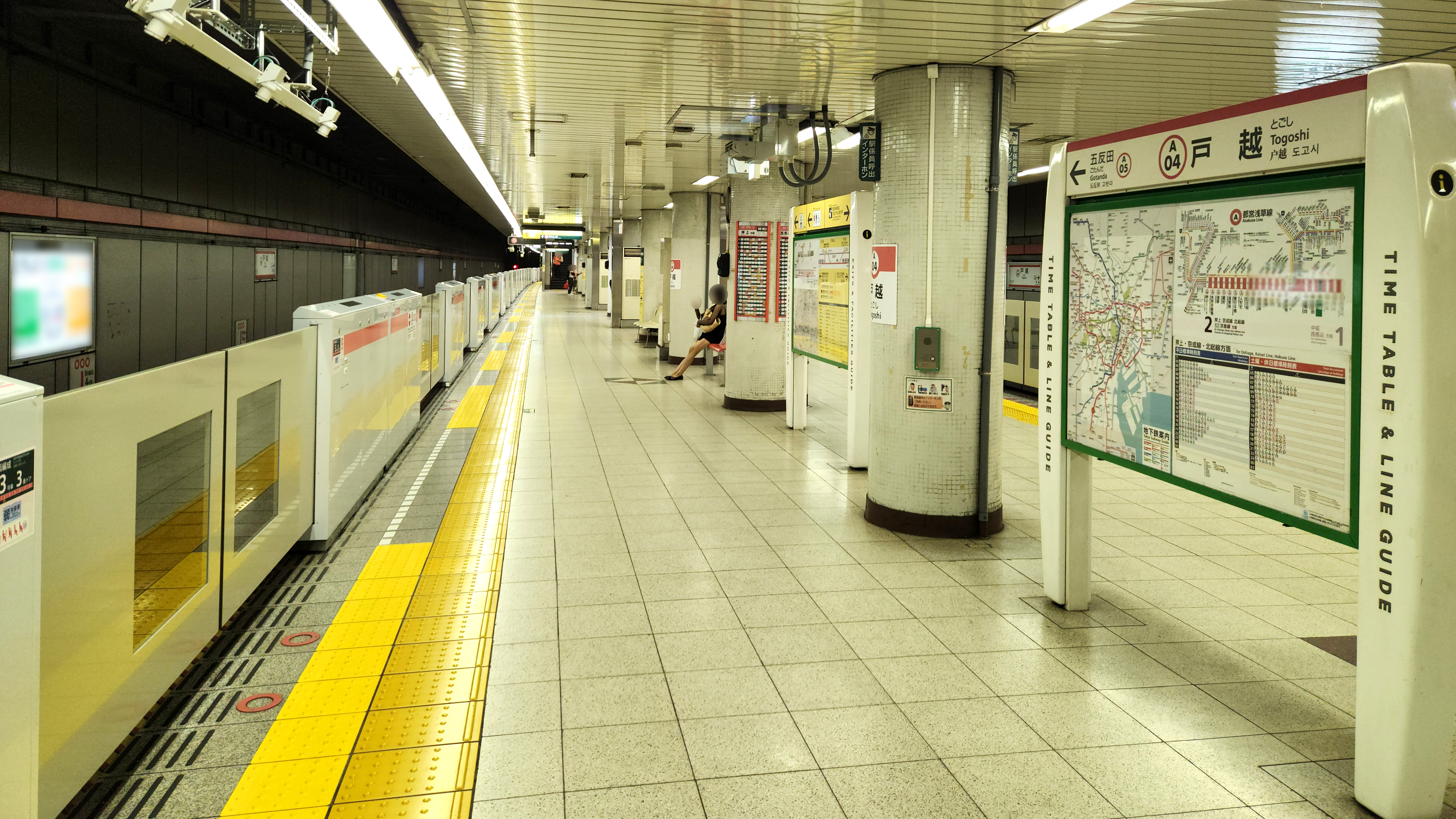
Platforms at the Station in September 2023

== History ==
Togoshi opened on November 15, 1968, as a station on Toei Line 1. In 1978, the line took its present name.

From 1927 to 1936, Shimo-shimmei on the Tōkyū Ōimachi Line had the name Togoshi Station.

== Surrounding area ==
The station serves the Togoshi neighborhood. Other nearby points of interest include:

- Togoshi-ginza on the Tōkyū Ikegami Line
- The Togoshi Ginza shopping district
- Hoshi University
