= Nakanobu Station =

Railway and metro station in Tokyo, Japan

Coordinates: 35.6058°N 139.7129°E

Nakanobu Station 中延駅

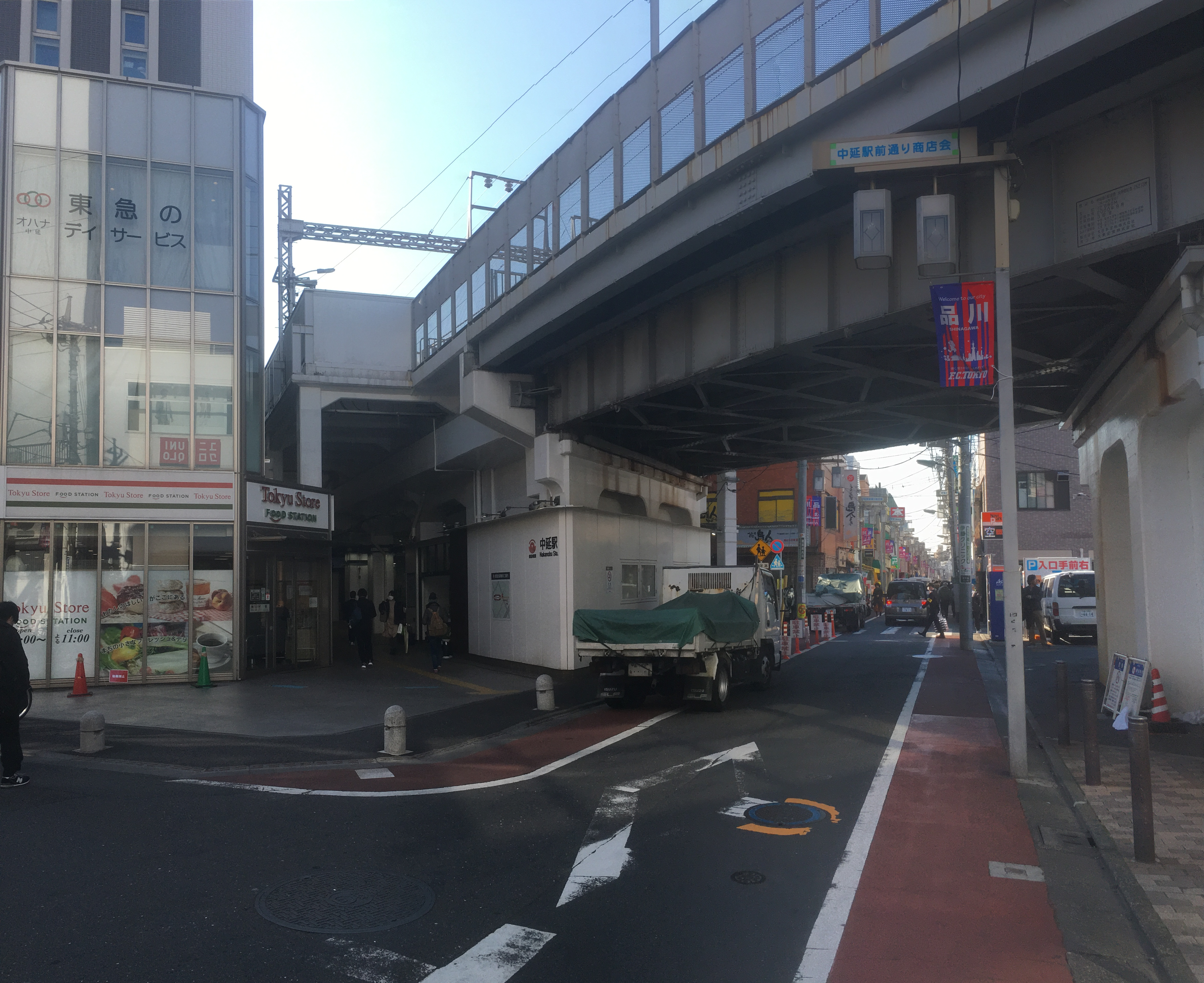
- Tokyu station entrance, February 2020

General information
- Location: 4-5-5 Nakanobu (Tokyu); 2-9-12 Higashi-Nakanobu (Toei); Shinagawa City, Tokyo; Japan
- Operator: Tōkyū Railways; Toei Subway
- Lines: Ōimachi Line; Asakusa Line
- Connections: Bus stop

Construction
- Structure type: Elevated (Tokyu), Underground (Toei)

Other information
- Station code: OM04, A03

History
- Opened: 6 July 1927; 99 years ago (Tokyu); 15 November 1968; 57 years ago (Toei)

Services
Preceding station	Tōkyū Railways	Following station
Ebaramachi towards Mizonokuchi	Ōimachi Line Local Local	Togoshi-koen towards Ōimachi
Preceding station	Toei Subway	Following station
Magome towards Nishi-magome	Asakusa Line	Togoshi towards Oshiage
Location
- Location within Special wards of Tokyo Location within Tokyo Bay and Bōsō Peninsula Location within Japan

Nakanobu Station (中延駅, Nakanobu-eki) is a railway station in Shinagawa, Tokyo, Japan, operated by the private railway operator Tokyu Corporation and the Tokyo subway operator Toei Subway.

== Station layout ==
=== Tokyu platforms ===
Two elevated side platforms.

1	Ōimachi Line	for Hatanodai, Jiyūgaoka, Futako-Tamagawa, and Mizonokuchi; Tokyu Den-en-Toshi Line for Saginuma
2	Oimachi Line	for Ōimachi

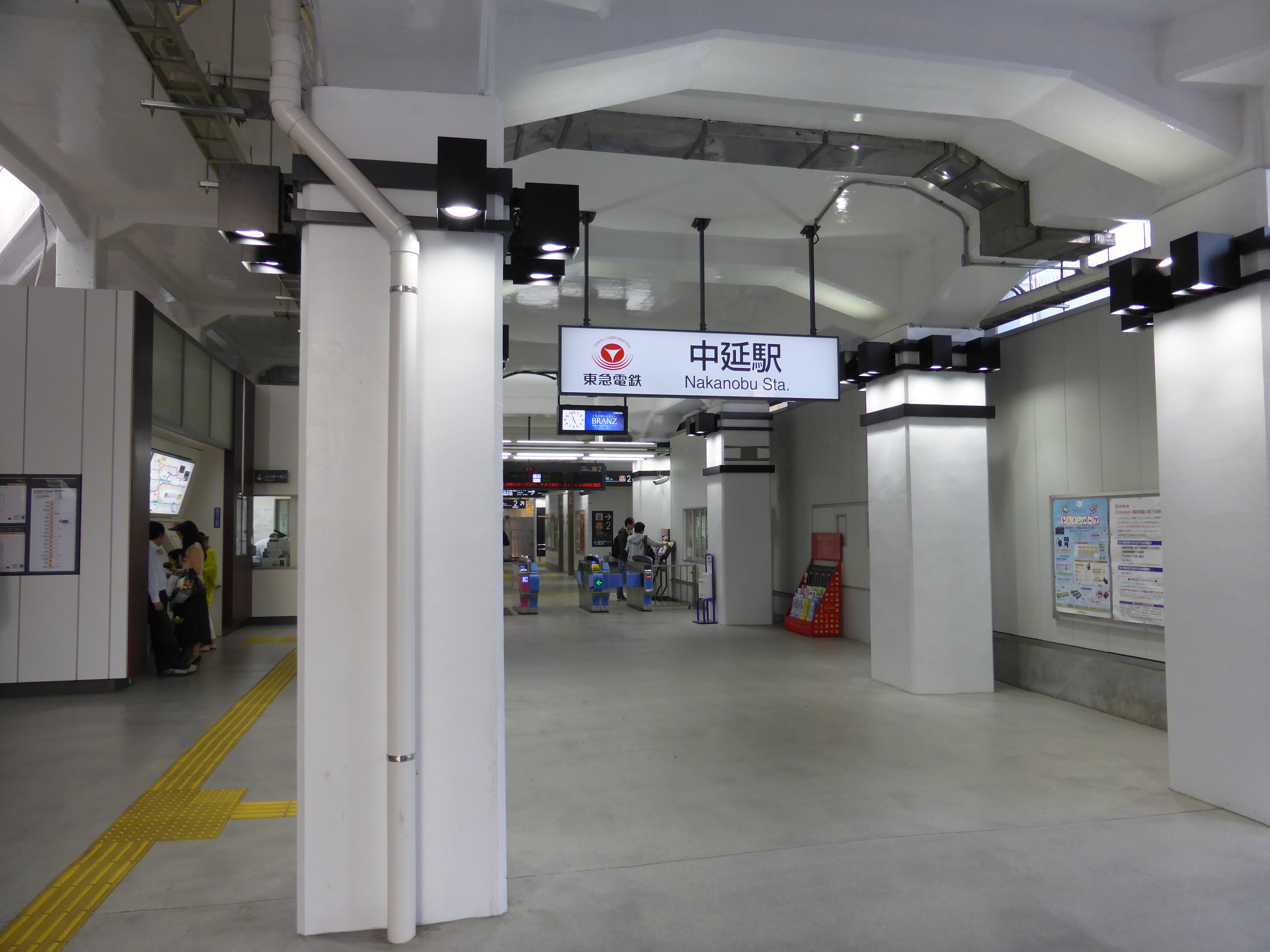
Ticket gates, 2015

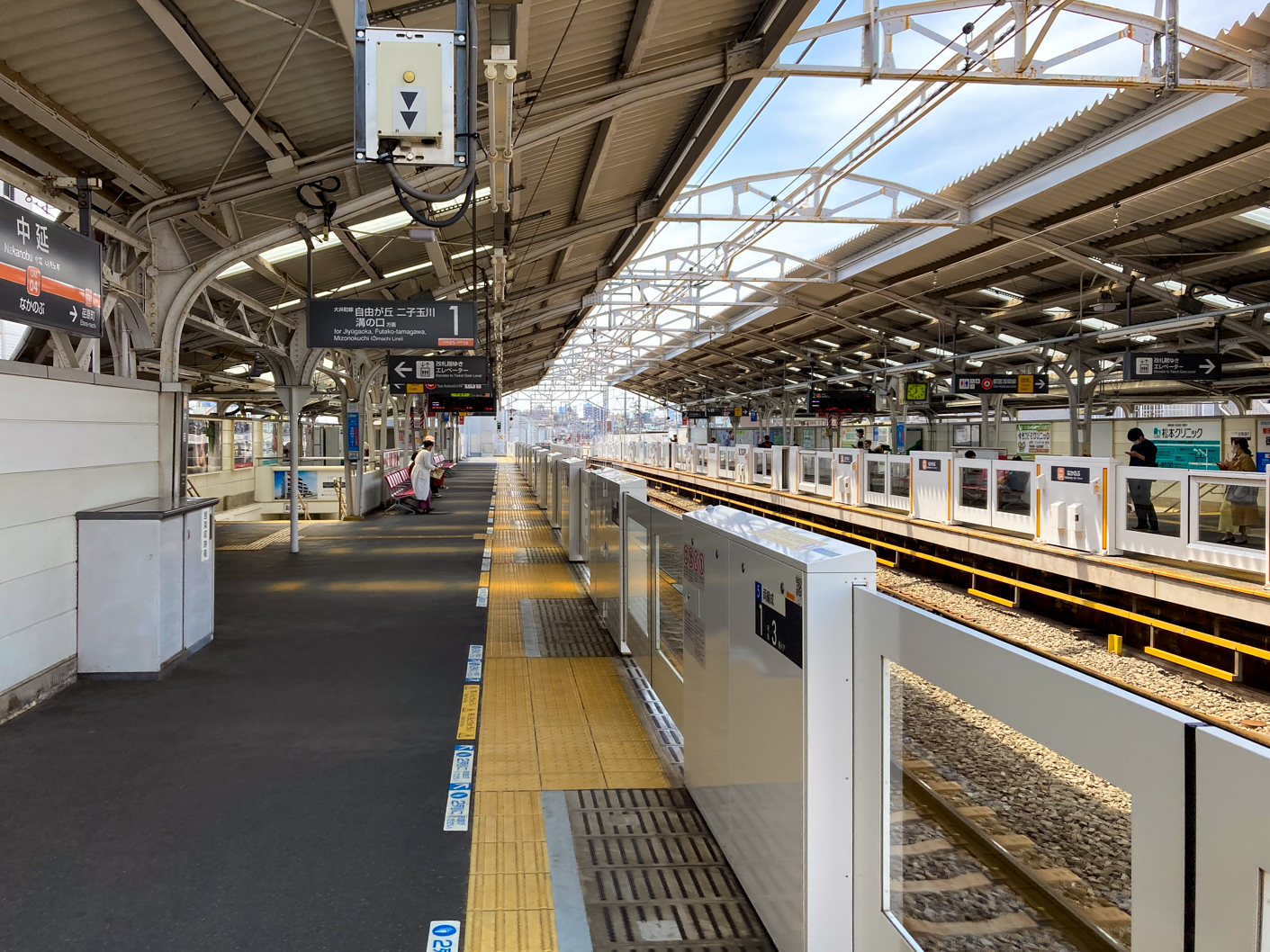
Platforms, April, 2021

=== Toei platforms ===
An underground island platform. The station number is A-03.

1	Asakusa Line	for Nishi-magome
2	Asakusa Line	for Sengakuji, Nihombashi, and Oshiage; Keisei Main Line for Narita Airport (Terminal 2·3 and Terminal 1); Narita Sky Access Line for Narita Airport; Hokusō Line for Imba Nihon-Idai; Shibayama Railway Line for Shibayama-Chiyoda

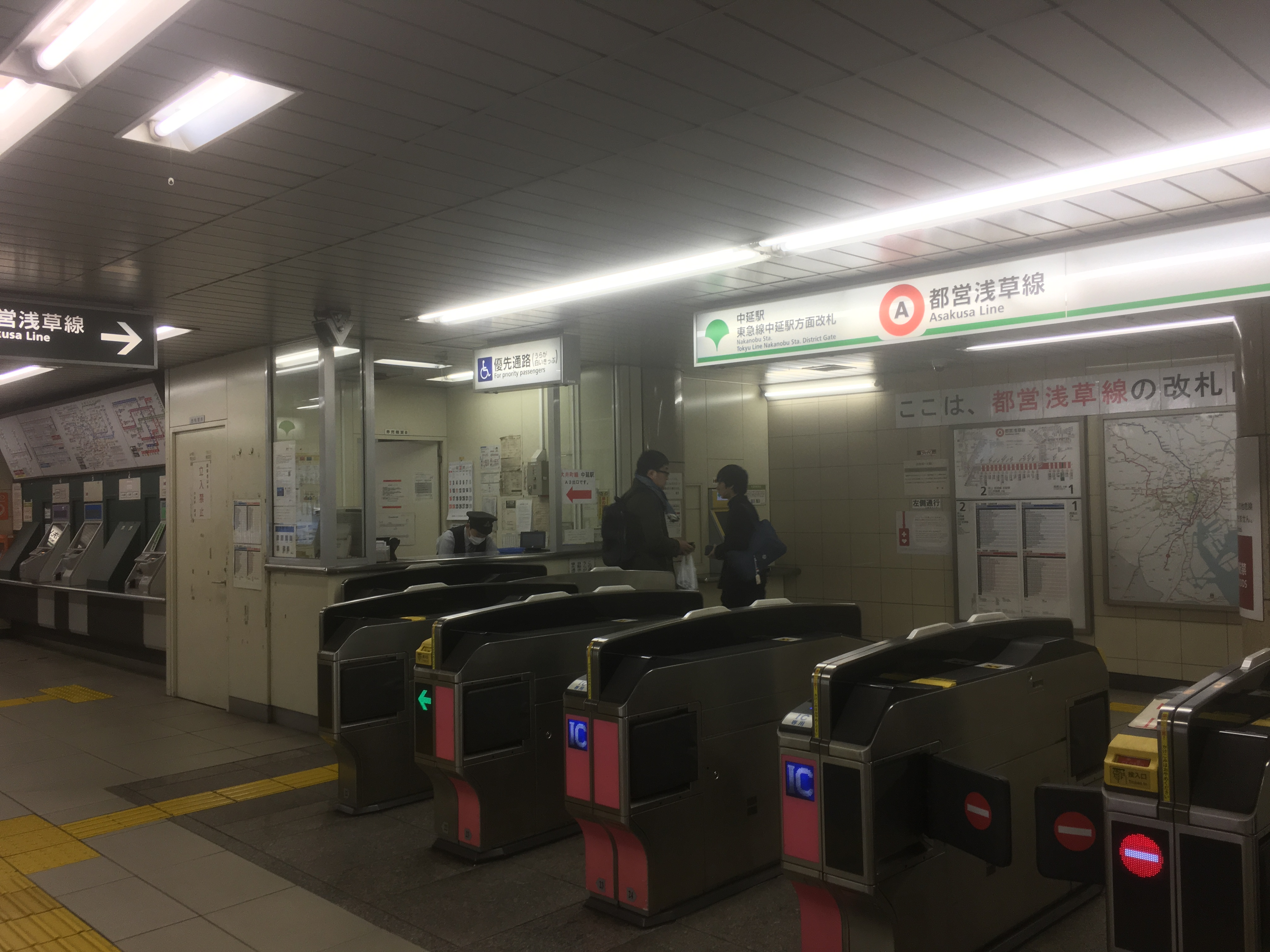
Ticket gates, February 2020

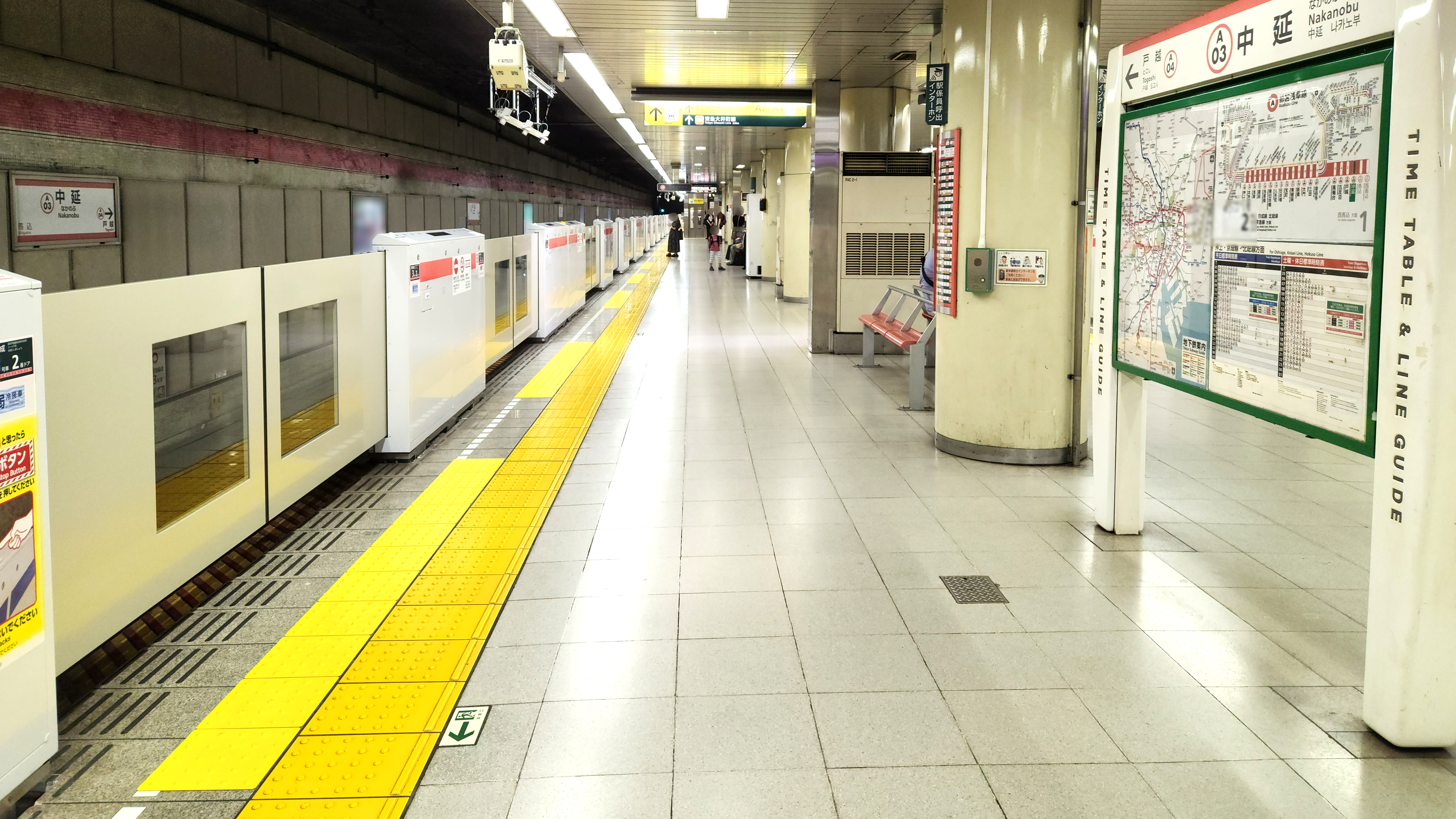
Platform in September 2023

== History ==
- July 6, 1927: The station opens on the Meguro-Kamata Electric Railway Oimachi Line.
- November 15, 1968: The Toei station opens on what is then called Toei Line 1.
- January 1, 1978: Toei Line 1 is renamed the Toei Asakusa Line.

== Bus services ==
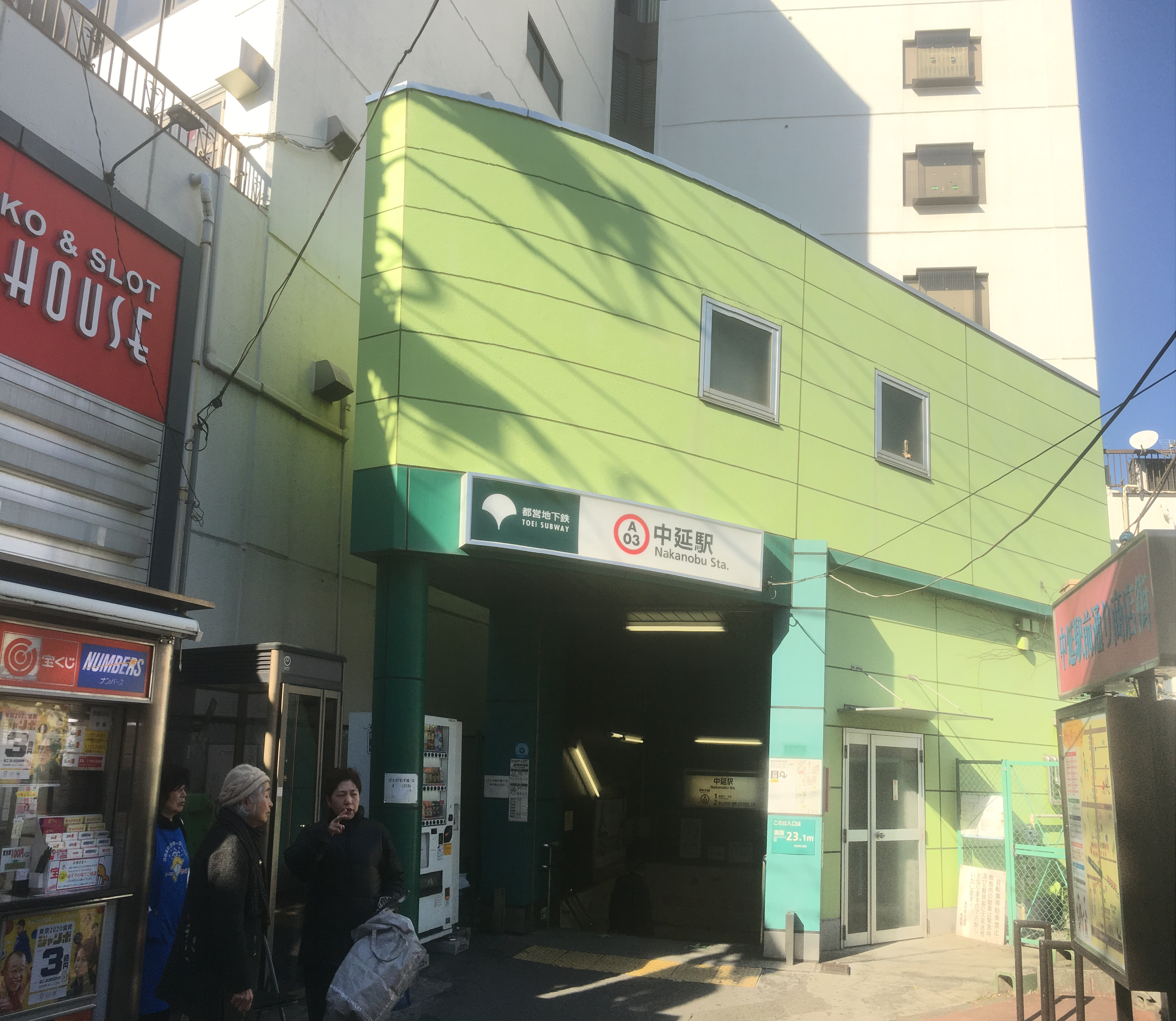
Toei station entrance, 2020

- Nakanobu Station (中延駅前, Nakanobu-eki-mae) bus stop
