= Magome Station =

Metro station in Tokyo, Japan

Coordinates: 35.5963°N 139.7119°E

Magome Station 馬込駅

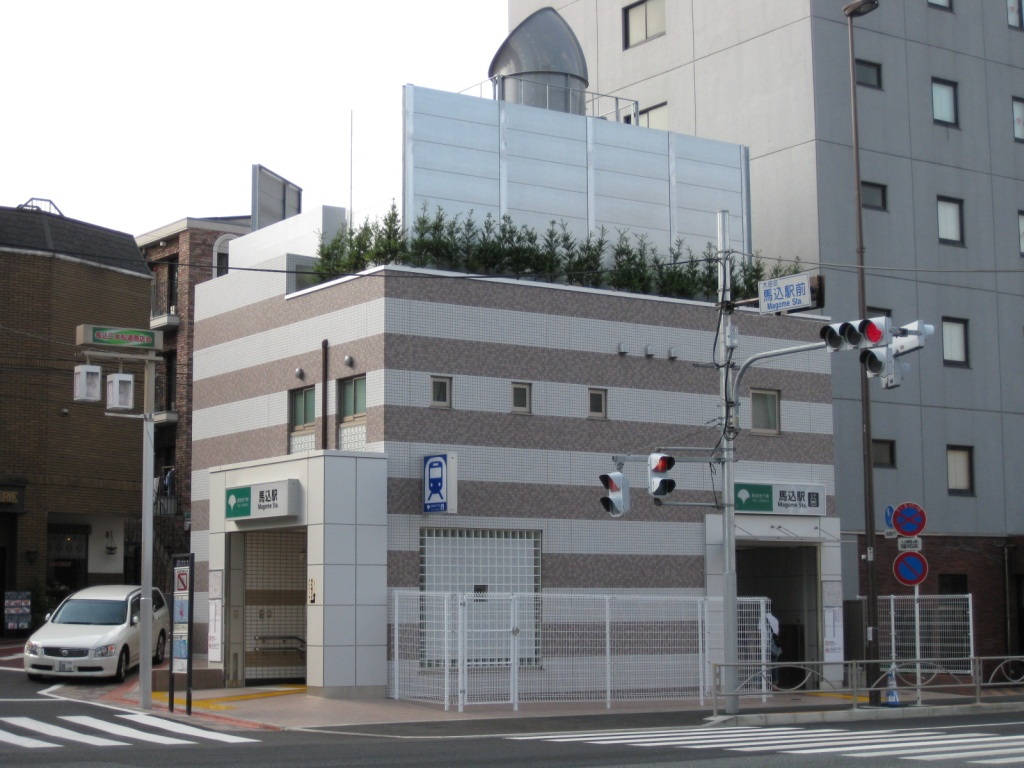
- Exit, 2010

General information
- Location: 2-31-9 Kitamagome, Ōta City, Tokyo; Japan
- Operator: Toei Subway
- Line: Asakusa Line
- Platforms: 1 island platform
- Tracks: 2

Construction
- Structure type: Underground

Other information
- Station code: A02

History
- Opened: 15 November 1968; 57 years ago

Services
Preceding station	Toei Subway	Following station
Nishi-magome Terminus	Asakusa Line	Nakanobu towards Oshiage
Track layout
Location
- Location within Special wards of Tokyo Location within Tokyo Bay and Bōsō Peninsula Location within Tokyo Location within Japan

Magome Station (馬込駅, Magome-eki) is a subway station on the Toei Asakusa Line, operated by the Tokyo Metropolitan Bureau of Transportation. It is located in Ōta, Tokyo, Japan. Its number is A-02.

== Station layout ==
Magome Station is composed of a singular island platform serving two tracks. Platform 1 is for passengers bound for Nishi-magome, whereas Platform 2 is for those traveling in the opposite direction toward Sengakuji and Oshiage.

=== Platforms ===
1	Asakusa Line	for Nishi-magome
2	Asakusa Line	for Sengakuji, Nihombashi, and Oshiage; Keisei Main Line for Aoto, Keisei Takasago, Keisei Sakura, Keisei Narita, and Narita Airport (Terminal 2·3 and Terminal 1); Hokusō Line for Imba Nihon-idai; Narita Sky Access Line for Narita Airport; Shibayama Railway Line for Shibayama-Chiyoda

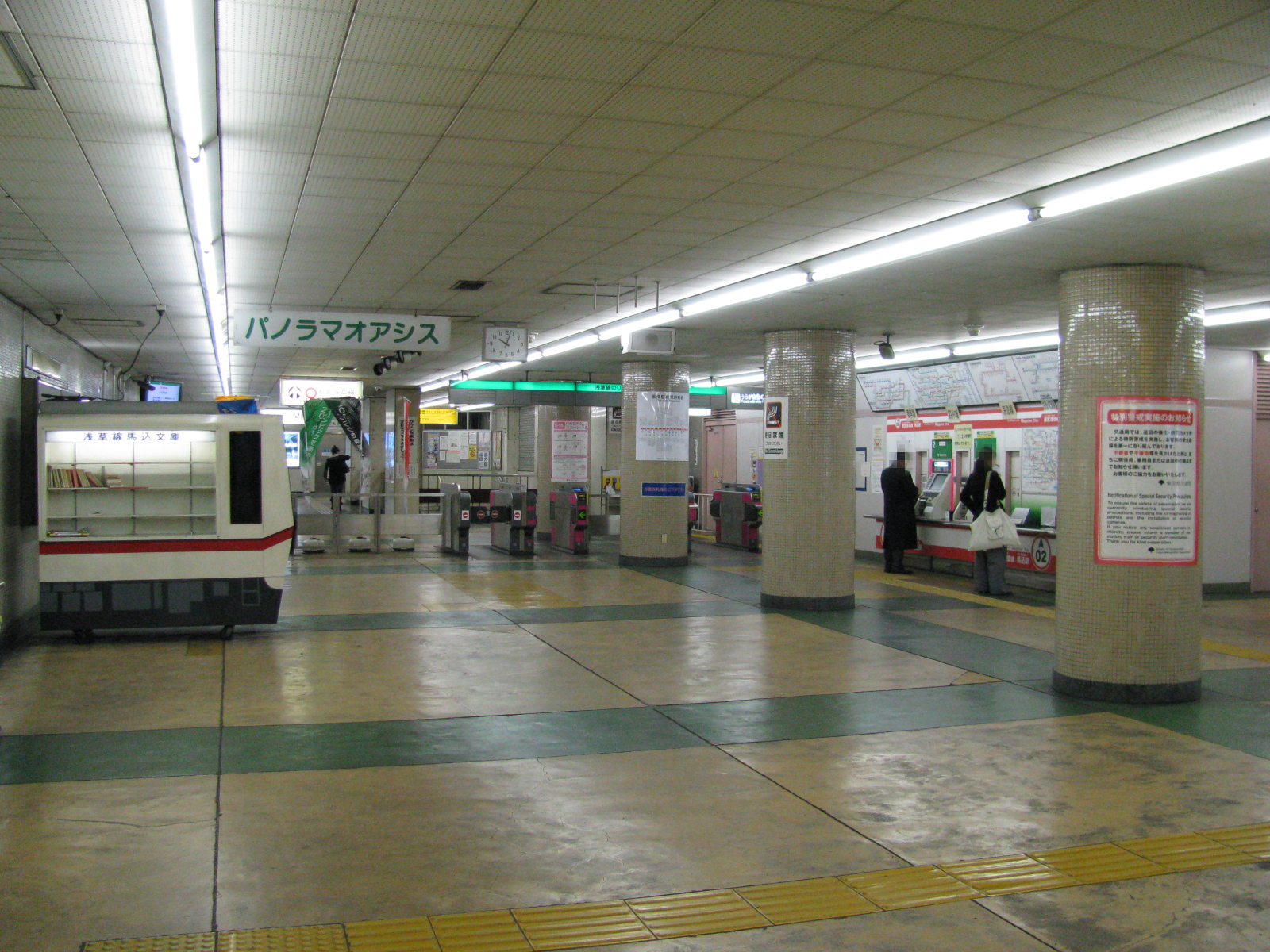
Ticket concourse, 2007

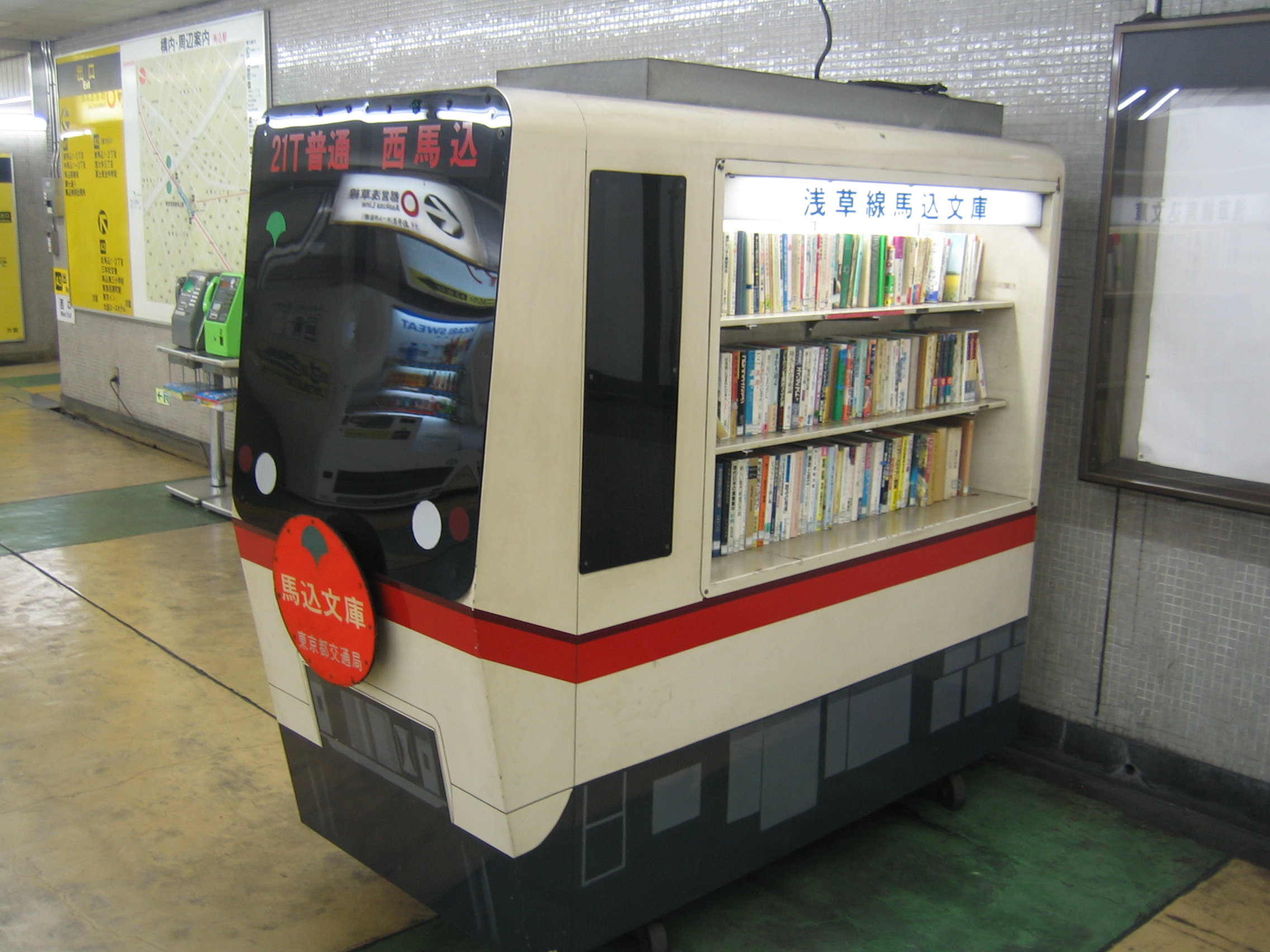
A "little free library" in the shape of a Toei 5300 series at the ticket concourse

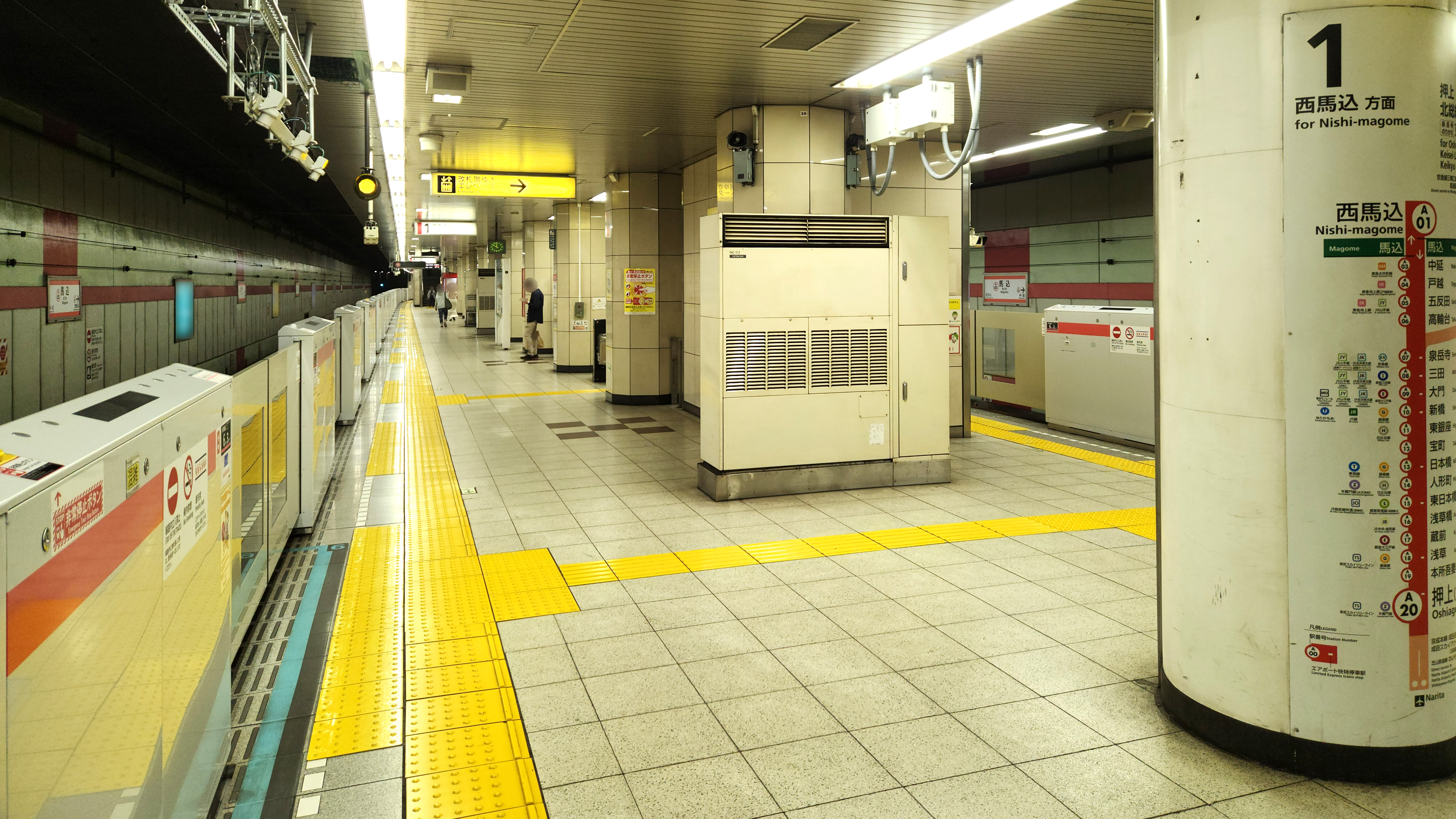
The platform in 2023

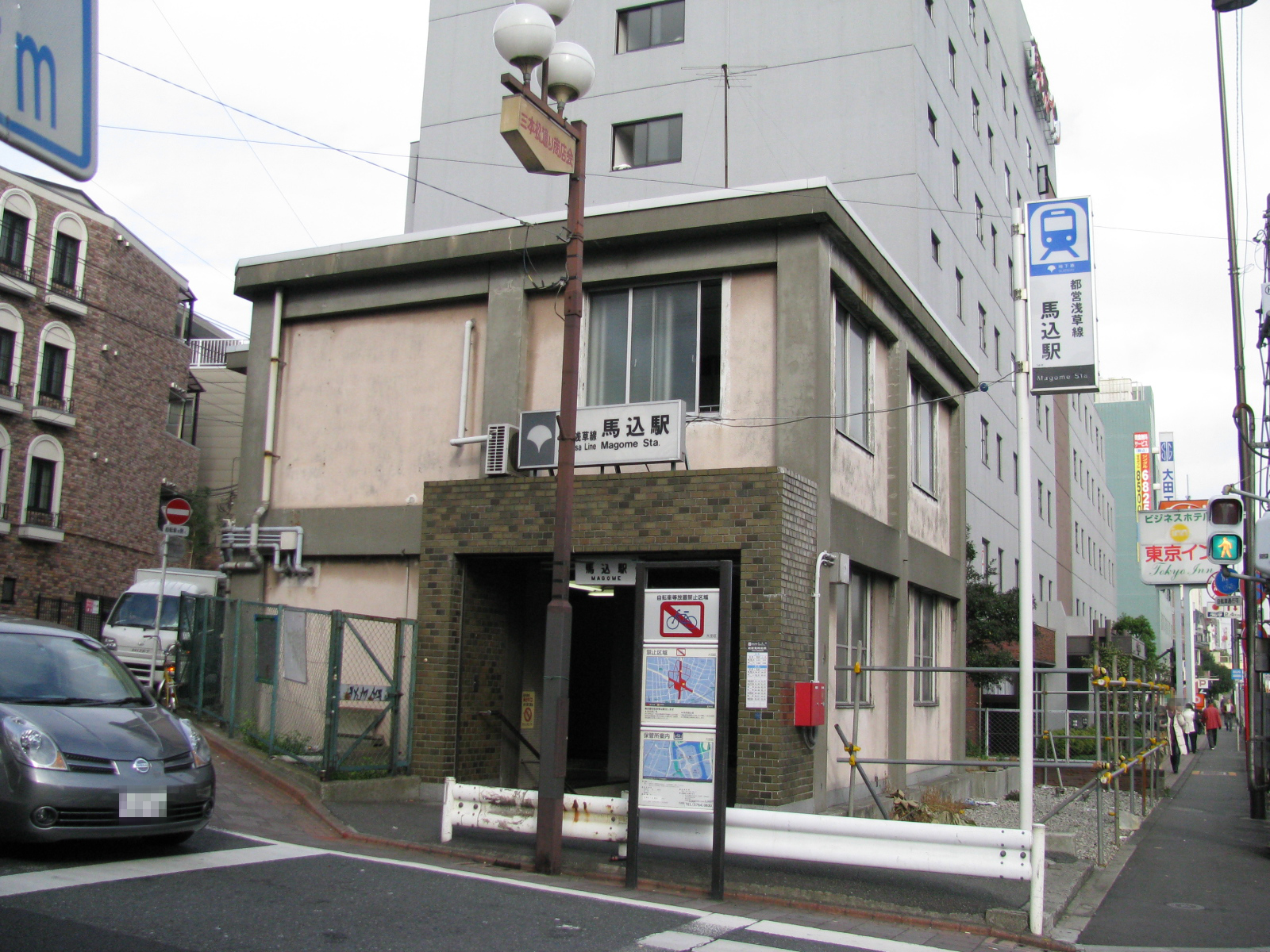
Exit in 2007

== History ==
Magome opened on November 15, 1968 as a station on Toei Line 1. In 1978, the line took its present name.

== Surrounding area ==
The station serves the Kita Magome neighborhood. Nearby are a public library, and a Ricoh facility.
