= Nishi-magome Station =

Metro station in Tokyo, Japan

Coordinates: 35.5868°N 139.7059°E

Nishi-magome Station 西馬込駅

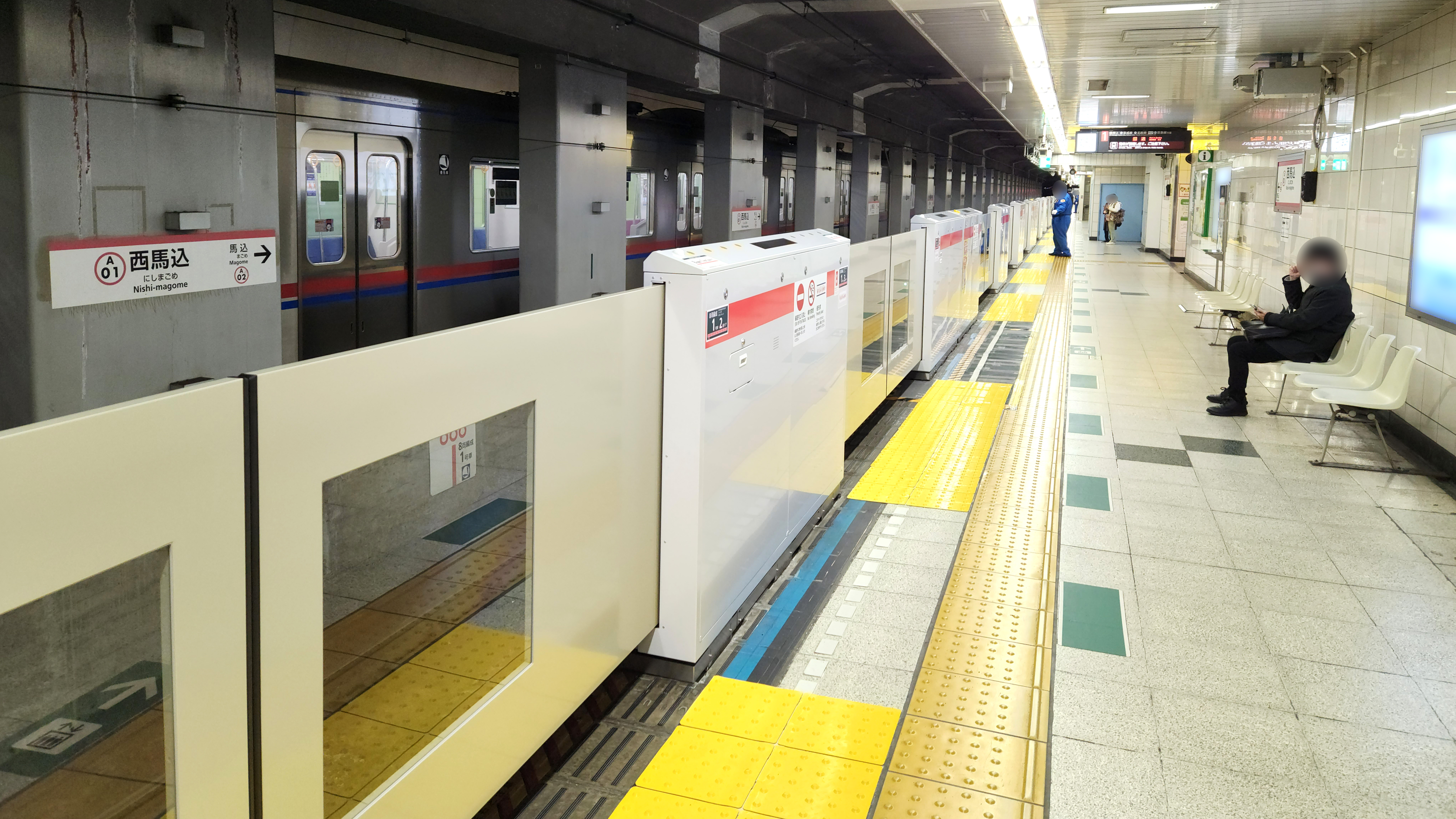
- Platform level of the station in November 2023

General information
- Location: 2-1-6 Nishimagome; Ōta City, Tokyo; Japan
- System: Toei Subway
- Operator: Toei Subway
- Transit authority: Toei Subway
- Line: Asakusa Line
- Platforms: 2 side platforms
- Tracks: 2
- Bus routes: 反01, 反02, 森01
- Bus stands: 2
- Bus operators: Tokyu
- Connections: 反01, 反02, 森01

Construction
- Structure type: Underground
- Depth: 12 m (39 ft)
- Accessible: Yes

Other information
- Station code: A01

History
- Opened: 15 November 1968; 57 years ago

Passengers
- 2024: 43,636 per day

Services
Preceding station	Toei Subway	Following station
Terminus	Asakusa Line	Magome towards Oshiage
Track layout
Location
- Location within Special wards of Tokyo Location within Tokyo Bay and Bōsō Peninsula Location within Japan

Nishi-magome Station (西馬込駅, Nishi-magome Eki) is the southern terminal of the Toei Asakusa Line, a subway line operated by the Tokyo Metropolitan Bureau of Transportation. It is located in Ōta, Tokyo, Japan and is the southernmost station of the Tokyo subway network. Its station number is A-01.

== History ==
Nishi-magome opened on November 15, 1968, as a station on Toei Line 1. In 1978, the line took its present name.

== Platforms ==
Nishi-magome has two platforms. Because this is the terminal station, trains on both tracks go in the same direction.

1,2	Asakusa Line	for Sengakuji, Shimbashi, Asakusa and Oshiage; Keisei Line lines for Keisei-Takasago, Keisei-Tsudanuma and Narita Airport; Hokuso Railway for Imba-Nihon-Idai; Narita Sky Access Line for Narita Airport; Shibayama Railway Line for Shibayama-Chiyoda

== Surroundings ==
The station is located underneath the Daini Keihin highway, and serves the Nishi-Magome and Minami-Magome neighborhoods. It is one of the closest stations to the temple of Ikegami Honmon-ji.

The next station to the north-east is Magome Station.

Nishi-magome is located directly north of the Magome train car repair facility which handles maintenance for rolling stock used on the Toei Asakusa Line and Oedo Line. Oedo Line trains access this facility by passing through the Asakusa Line using a connecting tunnel near Shimbashi Station (Shiodome Station on the Oedo Line).

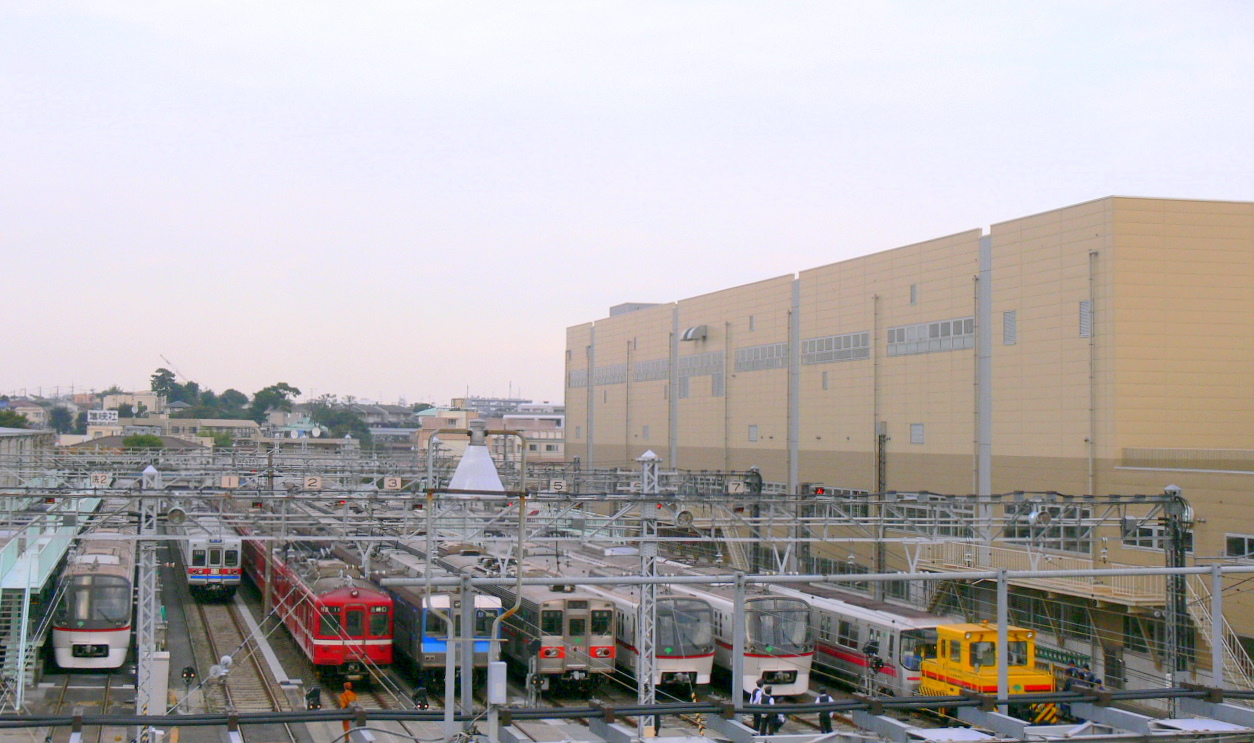
Magome rail yard
