= Toei Subway =

Subway system in Greater Tokyo, Japan

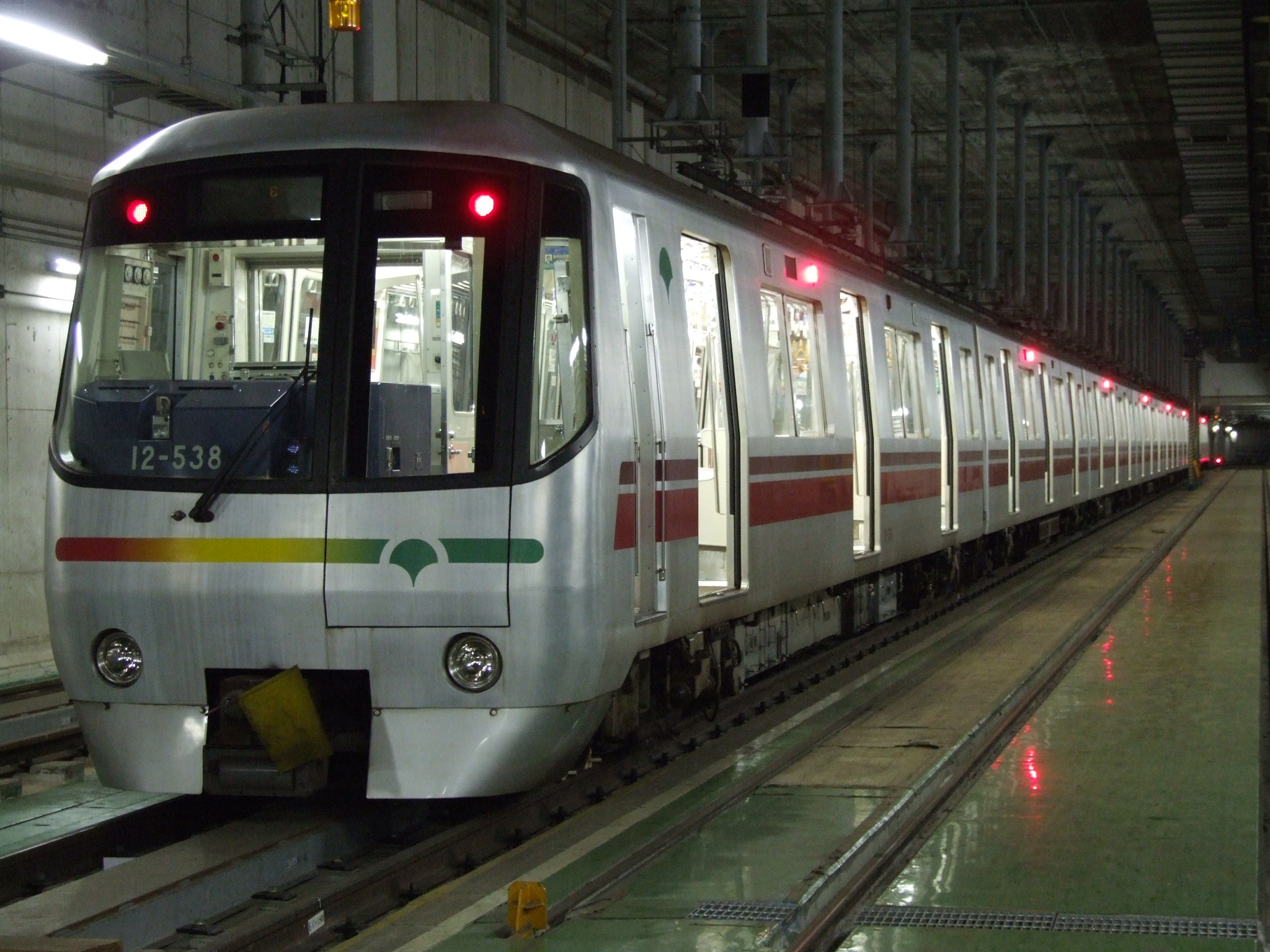
- A Toei 12-000 series train at Kiba Depot

Overview
- Native name: 都営地下鉄
- Locale: Tokyo, Japan
- Transit type: Rapid transit
- Number of lines: 4
- Number of stations: 106
- Daily ridership: 2.60 million (FY 2025)
- Website: Toei

Operation
- Began operation: 4 December 1960; 65 years ago
- Operator: Tokyo Metropolitan Bureau of Transportation

Technical
- System length: 109.0 km (67.7 mi)
- Track gauge: 1,435 mm (4 ft 8 1/2 in) (Asakusa and Ōedo lines); 1,372 mm (4 ft 6 in) (Shinjuku line); 1,067 mm (3 ft 6 in) (Mita line)
- Electrification: Overhead line, 1,500 V DC
System map
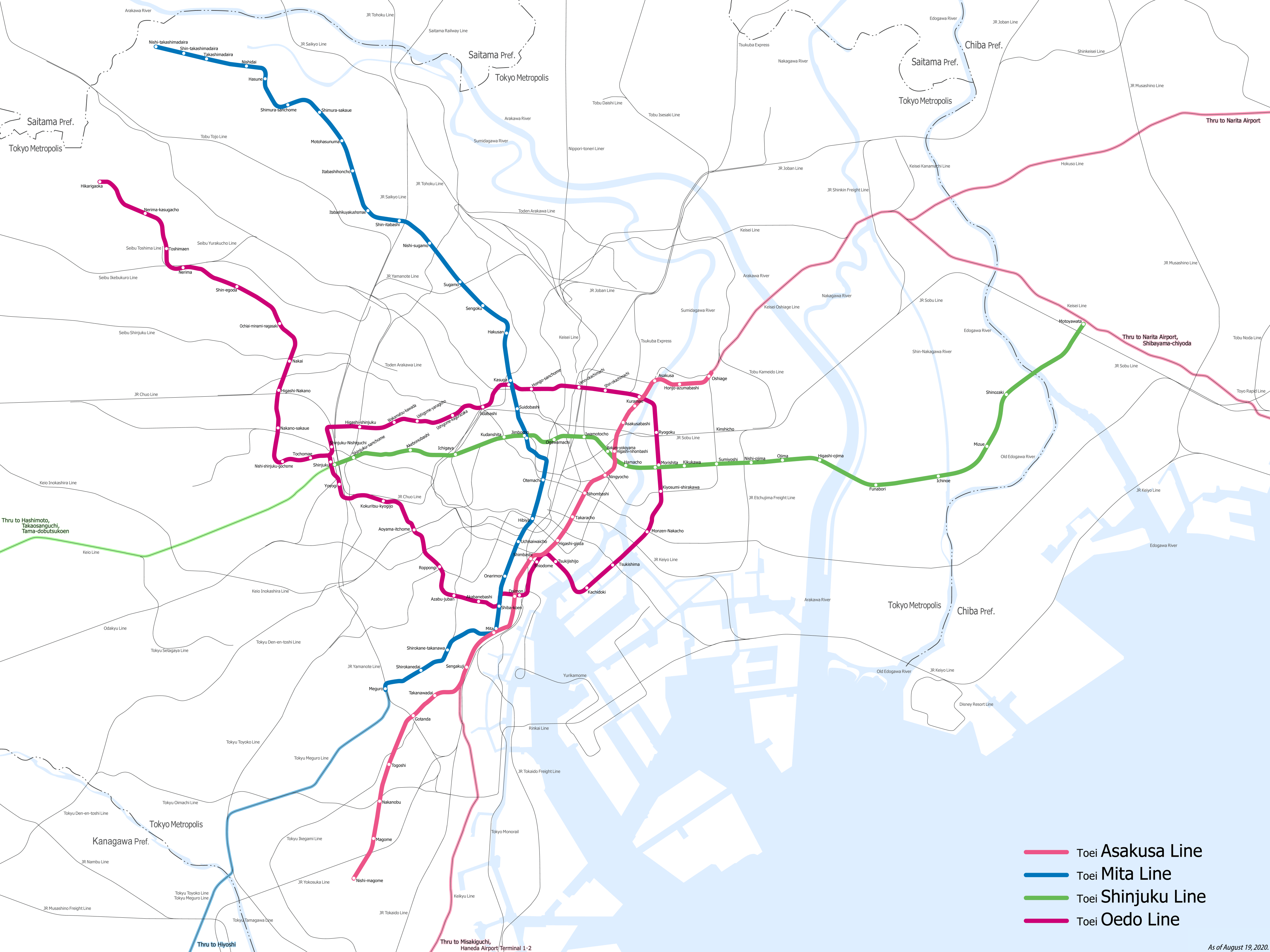
Toei Subway lines

The Toei Subway (Japanese: 都営地下鉄; lit. 'metropolis-operated subway') is a major rapid transit system in Tokyo, Japan, operated by the Tokyo Metropolitan Bureau of Transportation under the Tokyo Metropolitan Government Ordinance on Underground High-Speed Trains. The Toei Subway lines were originally licensed to the Teito Rapid Transit Authority (the predecessor of Tokyo Metro) but were constructed by the Tokyo Metropolitan Government following transfers of the licenses for each line in 1958.

It is the one of Tokyo's two subway operators, with an average daily ridership of 2.85 million; the other operator, the Tokyo Metro, carries approximately 6.52 million passengers per day, as of 2023. The subway has run at a financial loss for most of its history due to high construction expenses, particularly for the Oedo Line. However, it reported its first net profit of ¥3.13bn ($26.9 mil) in FY2006.

Tokyo Metro and Toei Subway form completely separate networks. While users of prepaid rail passes can freely interchange between the two networks, regular ticket holders must purchase a second ticket, or a special transfer ticket, to change from a Toei line to a Tokyo Metro line and vice versa. The sole exceptions are on the segment of the Toei Mita Line between Meguro and Shirokane-Takanawa, where the platforms are shared with the Tokyo Metro Namboku Line, and at Kudanshita on the Shinjuku Line, where the platform is shared with the Tokyo Metro Hanzomon Line. At these stations, it is possible to change between the networks without passing through a ticket gate. It is one of only two rapid transit systems operating on 3 track gauges, the other being the Barcelona Metro, Spain, using narrow, standard and broad gauge.

== History ==
In 1920, Tokyo City, the administrative predecessor of today’s 23 special wards, announced its first formal subway development proposal through Tokyo City Notification No. 2 of 1920 (大正9年東京市告示第2号), designating seven routes. Consistent with the city’s broader policy of public ownership and operation of urban transportation, the network was intended to be constructed and managed municipally. However, the Great Kantō Earthquake struck on September 1, 1923, inflicting catastrophic damage on central Tokyo and altering the city’s urban and transportation planning priorities.

In 1925, the Ministry of Home Affairs issued Ministry of Home Affairs Notification No. 56 of 1925 (大正14年内務省告示第56号), which formally designated five routes. Under this framework, Tokyo City obtained operating licenses for four of the five proposed subway lines. However, burdened by substantial public debt in the aftermath of earthquake reconstruction, the city faced strong opposition from both the Ministry of Home Affairs and the Ministry of Finance. As a result, Tokyo City was unable to secure final approval to commence construction, effectively halting its municipal subway plans.

At the time, the only subway line, now known as the Ginza Line, was constructed and operated separately by two private companies, the Tokyo Underground Railway and the Tokyo Rapid Railway, with through services between the two operators.

After the outbreak of World War II, the Japanese government integrated these two companies in 1941 to form the Teito Rapid Transit Authority (TRTA), commonly known as Eidan, which later became the predecessor of today's Tokyo Metro.

=== Postwar construction ===
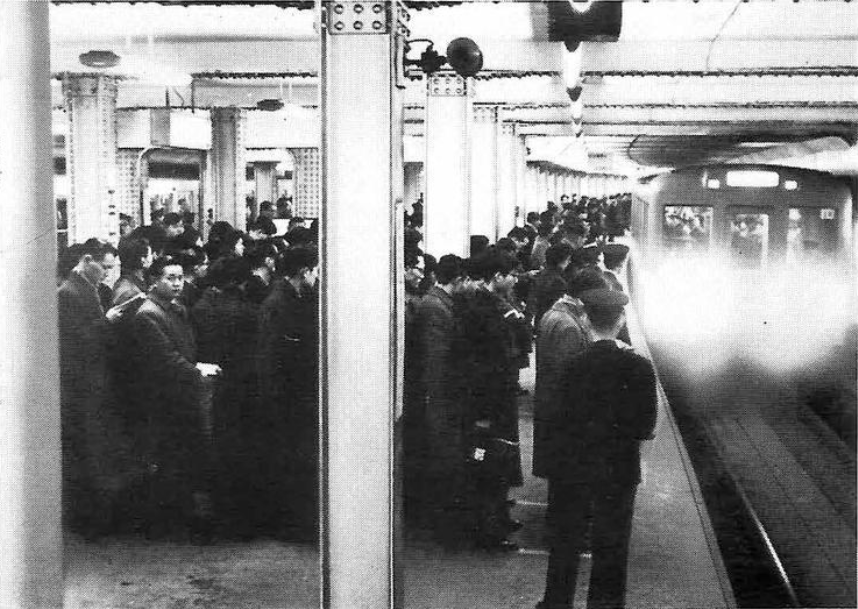
A crowded platform on the Teito Rapid Transit Authority line during the 1950s.

In Tokyo during the 1950s, post–World War II economic expansion led to rapid population growth and a sharp increase in road traffic. As a result, the effectiveness of existing public transport infrastructure, such as the Tokyo Toden (tram) system, steadily declined due to chronic road congestion, while the existing Teito Rapid Transit Authority subway network alone was unable to keep pace with rising transportation demand.

In 1954, the Tokyo Metropolitan Assembly adopted a resolution to construct a public subway system in addition to the network operated by the Teito Rapid Transit Authority. In accordance with urban planning directives, the Tokyo Metropolitan government Tokyo Metropolitan Bureau of Transportation and Keikyu corporation obtained a license from the Teito Rapid Transit Authority to build its first line between Kuramae and Magome, and began construction of the line as part of the Toei Subway system in 1958.

Since the Toei Subway began operations on the Asakusa Line between Asakusabashi and Oshiage in 1960, with through services to the Keisei Line, the system has expanded steadily, with the opening of the Mita Line in December 1968, the Shinjuku Line in December 1978, and the Ōedo Line in December 1991. The Mita Line was extended between Meguro and Mita stations, and the Ōedo Line entered full operation.

== Lines ==
The Toei Subway is made up of four lines operating on 109.0 kilometers (67.7 mi) of route.

Name	No. (Note: Line numbers are only used internally and are not listed on subway maps)	Route	Stations	Length km (mi)	Opened	Daily ridership (FY2024)	Gauge
Asakusa Line	1	Nishi-magome – Oshiage	20	18.3 (11.4)	1960	1,457,778	1,435 mm (4 ft 8 1/2 in)
Mita Line	6	Meguro – Nishi-takashimadaira	27	26.5 (16.5)	1968	1,292,710	1,067 mm (3 ft 6 in)
Shinjuku Line	10	Shinjuku – Moto-Yawata	21	23.5 (14.6)	1978	1,480,760	1,372 mm (4 ft 6 in)
Ōedo Line	12	Hikarigaoka – Tochōmae	38	40.7 (25.3)	1991	1,777,914	1,435 mm (4 ft 8 1/2 in)
Total:			106	109.0 (67.7)		5,281,532	

=== Through services to other lines ===
The different gauges of the Toei lines arose in part due to the need to accommodate through services with private suburban railway lines. Through services currently in regular operation include:

Line	Through Lines
Asakusa	Keikyū Kurihama Line and Keikyū Airport Line both via the Keikyū Main Line (Sengakuji to Haneda Airport Terminal 1·2 or Misakiguchi)
Asakusa	Keisei Oshiage Line, Keisei Main Line, Keisei Narita Airport Line, Hokusō Line, Keisei Higashi-Narita Line and Shibayama Railway (Oshiage to Narita Airport Terminal 1, Imba Nihon-idai or Shibayama-Chiyoda)
Mita	Meguro Line (Meguro to Hiyoshi), then Tōkyū Shin-Yokohama Line (Hiyoshi to Shin-Yokohama), then Sōtetsu Shin-Yokohama Line (Shin-Yokohama to Nishiya), then Sōtetsu Main Line (Nishiya to Futamata-gawa to Ebina) or Sōtetsu Izumino Line (Futamata-gawa to Shōnandai)
Shinjuku	Keiō New Line and Keio Sagamihara Line both via the Keiō Line (Shinjuku to Hashimoto or Takaosanguchi)

- Mita Line shares tracks of the section from Meguro to Shirokane-takanawa with Tokyo Metro Namboku Line, 2.3 kilometres (1.4 mi).

== Revenue and ridership ==
According to the company, an average of 2.34 million people used the company's four subway routes each day in 2008. The company made a profit of ¥12.2 billion in 2009.

Source: Tokyo Metropolitan Government

Net profit (loss), in million JPY
JFY	Asakusa	Mita	Shinjuku	Oedo	Total
2006	6,714	2,170	9,328	(15,628)	2,584
2007	8,849	3,335	11,193	(12,398)	10,980
2008	15,514	4,197	12,197	(11,580)	20,329
2009	9,676	4,102	10,653	(12,077)	12,355
2010	8,660	4,143	9,833	(13,238)	9,399
2011	7,853	3,649	9,543	(12,395)	8,650
2012	10,339	4,492	8,223	(10,296)	12,275
2013	10,244	4,756	8,586	(8,143)	15,446
2014	10,235	4,529	8,751	(4,939)	18,577
2015	10,716	5,831	10,581	(1,272)	25,856
2016	12,810	8,156	11,627	317	32,911
2017	13,496	9,276	10,535	876	34,184
2018	14,335	9,954	11,378	981	36,649
2019	12,279	8,356	10,460	(10,194)	20,912
2020	371	(687)	(41)	(14,226)	(14,584)
2021	1,467	1,045	2,269	(11,218)	(6,435)
2022	4,265	1,595	3,514	(9,823)	(447)
2023	8,666	6,302	6,249	(3,203)	18,013
2024	15,344	7,395	6,736	(3,094)	26,882

Note: All financial figures are in million ¥.

- Asakusa line
- Mita line
- Shinjuku line
- Oedo line

=== Ridership ===
Average daily ridership by line (Note: Includes transfers within the Toei Subway system from 2006 onward; transfers prior to this date are excluded.)
JFY	Asakusa	Mita	Shinjuku	Oedo	Total
1960	15,622	—N/a			15,622
1961	22,450	—N/a			22,450
1962	35,755	—N/a			35,755
1963	86,345	—N/a			86,345
1964	137,250	—N/a			137,250
1965	157,354	—N/a			157,354
1966	175,418	—N/a			175,418
1967	193,386	—N/a			193,386
1968	263,814	66,269	—N/a		330,083
1969	364,730	77,691	—N/a		442,421
1970	409,074	89,931	—N/a		499,005
1971	436,813	104,550	—N/a		541,363
1972	452,643	202,169	—N/a		654,812
1973	446,268	271,331	—N/a		717,599
1974	448,438	314,169	—N/a		762,607
1975	454,128	358,890	—N/a		813,018
1976	439,904	369,432	—N/a		809,336
1977	445,523	384,117	—N/a		829,640
1978	431,945	377,378	21,300	—N/a	830,623
1979	426,857	371,827	25,843	—N/a	824,527
1980	461,443	416,535	228,727	—N/a	1,106,705
1981	437,342	382,758	244,068	—N/a	1,064,168
1982	439,898	386,816	265,336	—N/a	1,092,050
1983	444,301	394,427	295,134	—N/a	1,133,862
1984	454,328	403,323	325,339	—N/a	1,182,990
1985	486,528	452,927	380,202	—N/a	1,319,657
1986	510,761	458,052	419,178	—N/a	1,387,991
1987	485,323	412,578	408,641	—N/a	1,306,542
1988	503,786	422,917	430,756	—N/a	1,357,459
1989	516,641	430,257	467,084	—N/a	1,413,982
1990	570,129	500,635	569,942	—N/a	1,640,706
1991	564,197	450,923	511,797	6,191	1,533,108
1992	615,040	440,120	439,912	18,906	1,513,978
1993	613,652	509,723	587,701	25,273	1,736,349
1994	611,493	504,186	586,336	27,553	1,729,568
1995	592,921	484,725	597,769	28,827	1,704,242
1996	545,621	408,709	507,731	29,424	1,491,485
1997	540,378	408,408	501,698	46,254	1,496,738
1998	536,621	405,923	500,350	103,038	1,545,932
1999	527,616	391,542	491,402	112,027	1,522,587
2000	571,897	405,183	488,457	198,526	1,664,063
2001	584,414	428,021	474,087	453,027	1,939,549
2002	593,123	436,542	478,931	504,934	2,013,530
2003	579,757	436,556	476,024	562,405	2,054,742
2004	574,995	501,180	585,937	647,573	2,309,685
2005	582,599	513,229	592,756	681,623	2,370,207
2006	597,415	527,777	608,645	720,162	2,453,999
2007	623,714	550,688	646,548	781,487	2,602,437
2008	632,555	564,380	662,950	796,257	2,656,142
2009	627,217	566,862	665,233	792,256	2,651,568
2010	623,563	564,345	664,792	795,461	2,648,161
2011	605,990	553,538	654,031	780,714	2,594,273
2012	635,486	573,146	665,377	825,666	2,699,675
2013	657,513	589,097	689,609	859,196	2,795,415
2014	669,603	600,570	701,902	878,960	2,851,035
2015	696,743	620,076	724,915	914,012	2,955,746
2016	718,855	638,365	745,889	933,621	3,036,730
2017	742,803	657,460	772,415	956,041	3,128,719
2018	764,911	672,738	792,321	976,957	3,206,927
2019	767,994	678,499	794,117	978,206	3,218,816
2020	504,604	459,124	555,442	653,881	2,173,051
2021	522,336	483,114	584,354	676,730	2,266,534
2022	600,055	547,997	647,592	750,383	2,546,027
2023	683,003	606,811	704,235	836,179	2,830,228
2024	728,889	646,355	740,380	888,957	3,004,581
2025	762,395	674,222	767,340	920,462	3,124,419

- Asakusa line
- Mita line
- Shinjuku line
- Oedo line

=== Branding ===
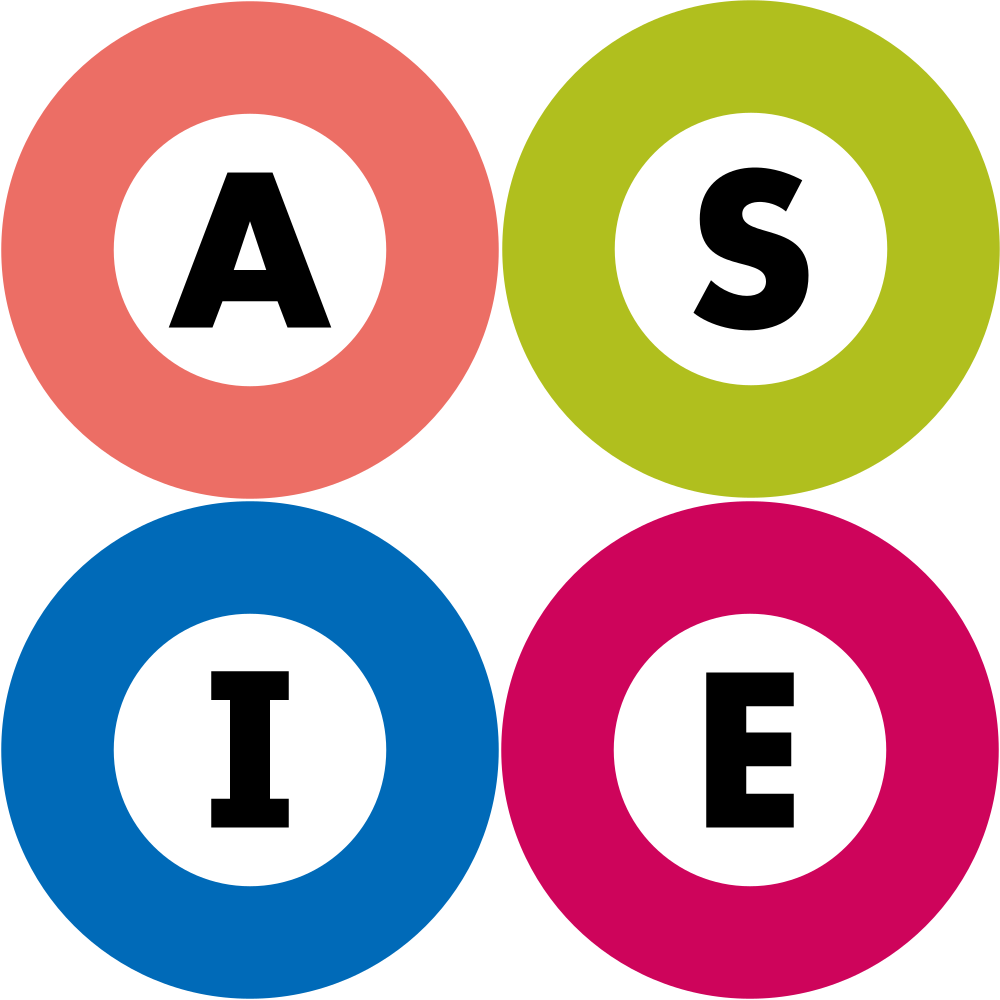
Icons of four lines, as the system consists of four lines, compared with Tokyo Metro’s nine.

Apart from its own logo, a stylized ginkgo leaf used as the symbol of the Tokyo Metropolis, Toei Subway shares a design language in common with Tokyo Metro. Lines are indicated by a letter in Futura Bold on a white background inside a roundel in the line color, with signs indicating stations adding the station number as well. Line colors and letter-designations are complementary with Tokyo Metro's, with none overlapping (e.g., the Mita Line's letter-designation is “I”, rather than “M”, which is used by the Tokyo Metro Marunouchi Line).

Informational signage is also designed identically, with platform-level station placards differing only in the placement of the bands in the line color: Toei Subway has two thin bands at the top and bottom, while Tokyo Metro has one wider band at the bottom (or, in the case of long, narrow placards, in a continuous band extending to the left and right along the wall itself).

== Stations ==
There are a total of 99 unique stations (i.e., counting stations served by multiple lines only once) on the Toei Subway network, or 106 total stations if each station on each line counts as one station. Almost all stations are located within the 23 special wards, with many located in areas not served by the complementary Tokyo Metro network.

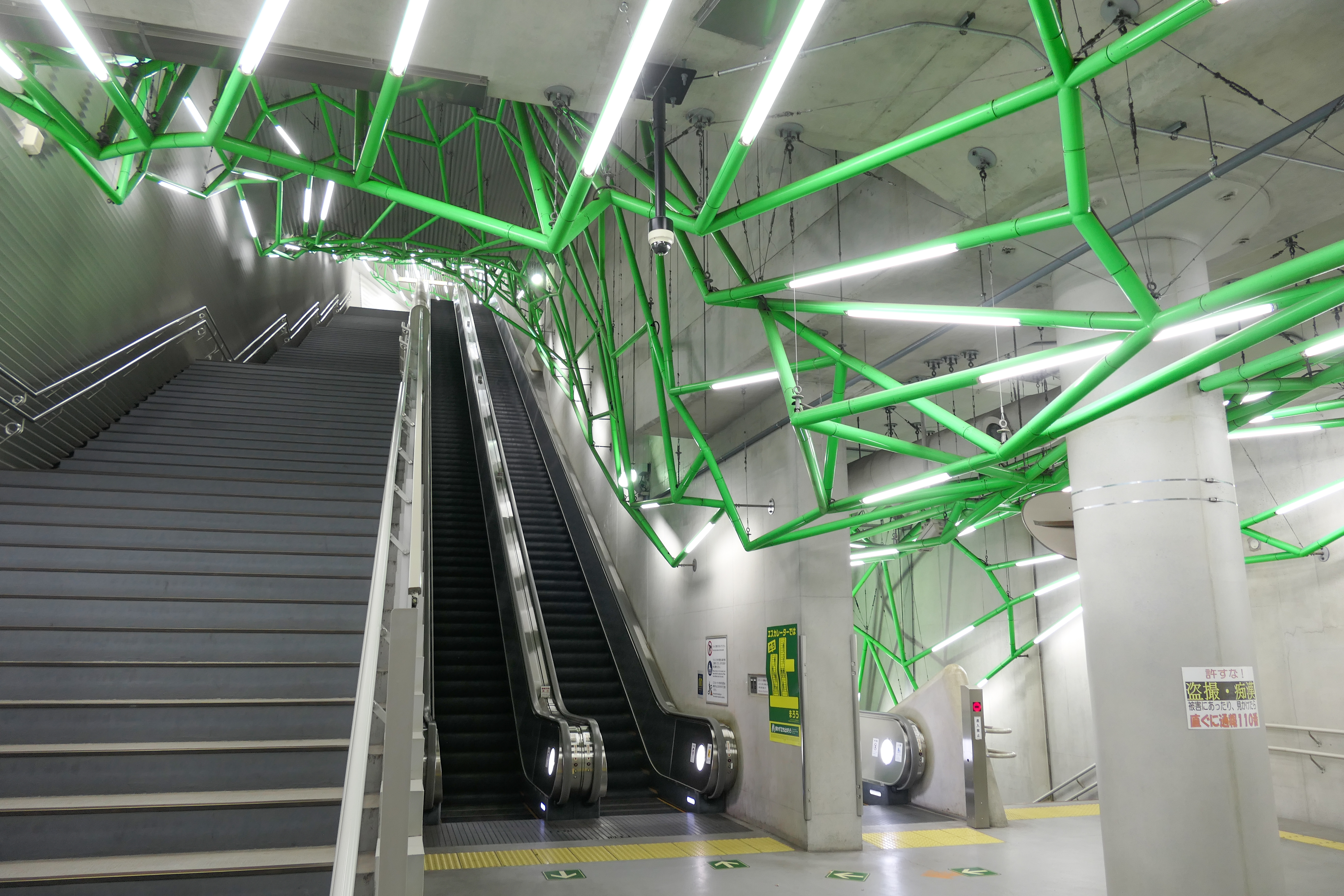
Underground passage stairs at Toei Subway Iidabashi Station, equipped with wire-frame lighting.

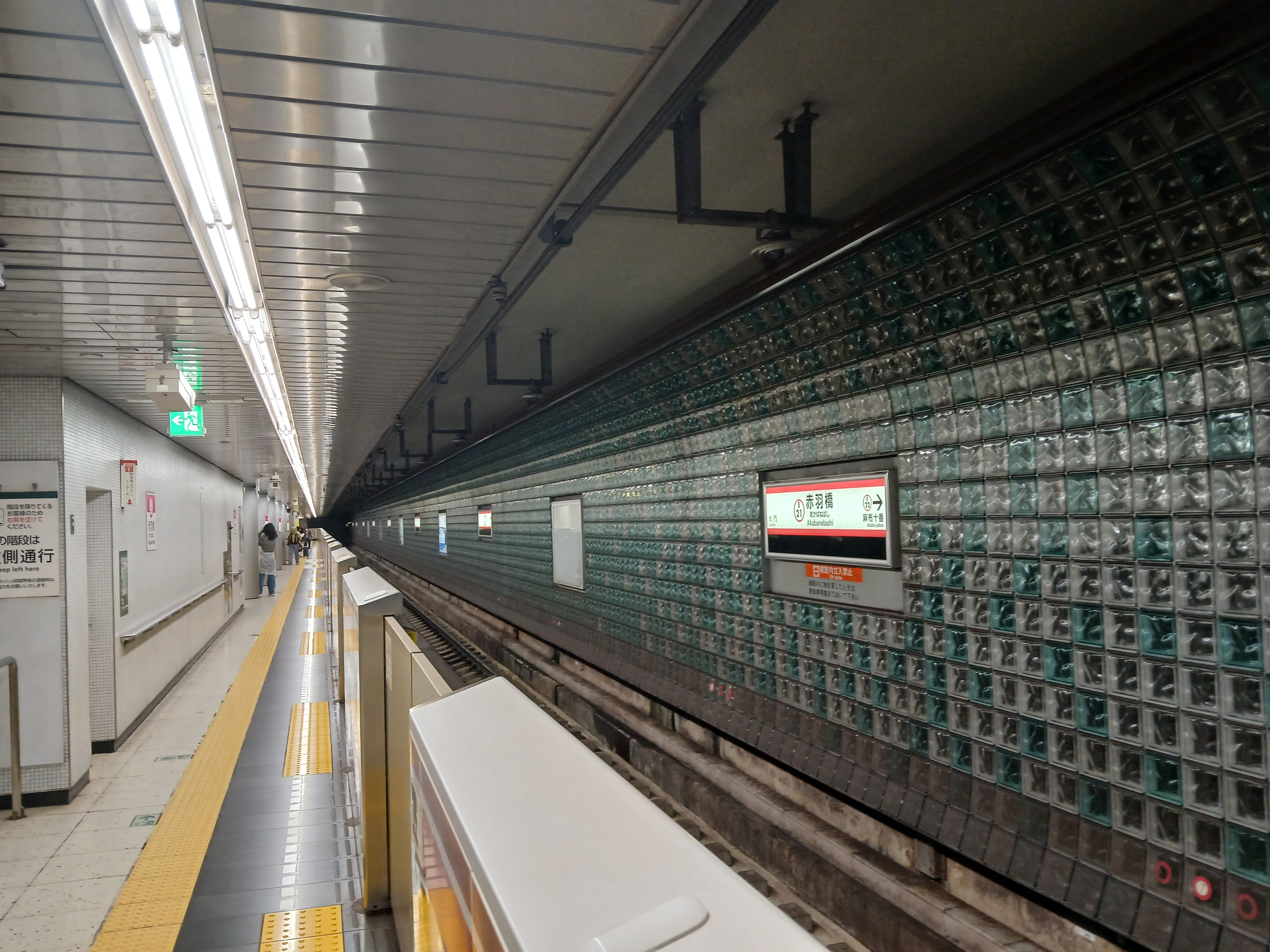
The platform at Akabanebashi Station features glass blocks and tiles made in Italy embedded in the walls.

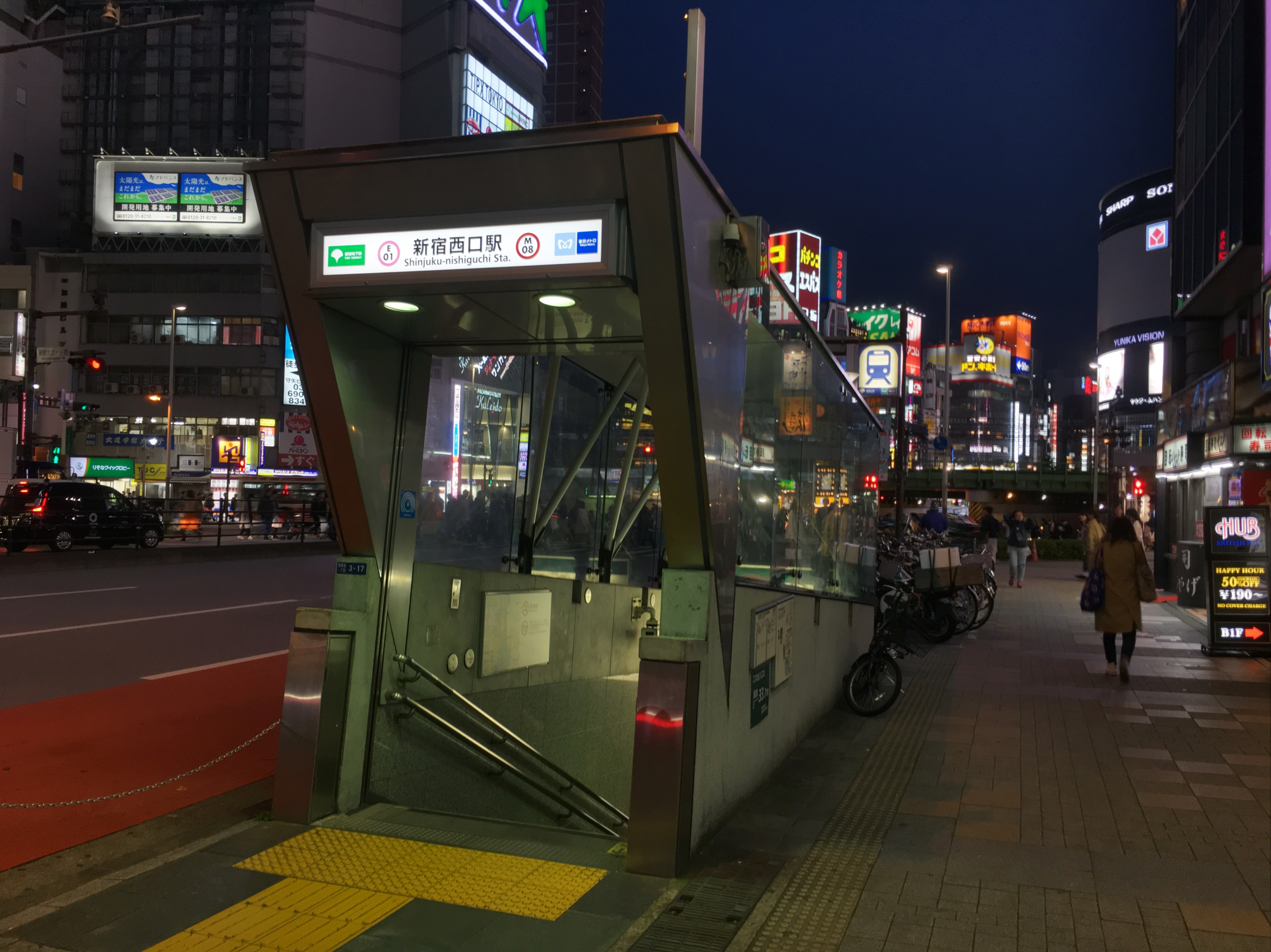
Shinjuku-Nishiguchi Station exit

== Rolling stock ==
=== Current vehicles ===
- Asakusa Line – 5500 series and E5000 series (electric locomotives)
- Mita Line – 6300 series and 6500 series
- Shinjuku Line – 10-300 series
- Oedo Line – 12-000 series and 12-600 series
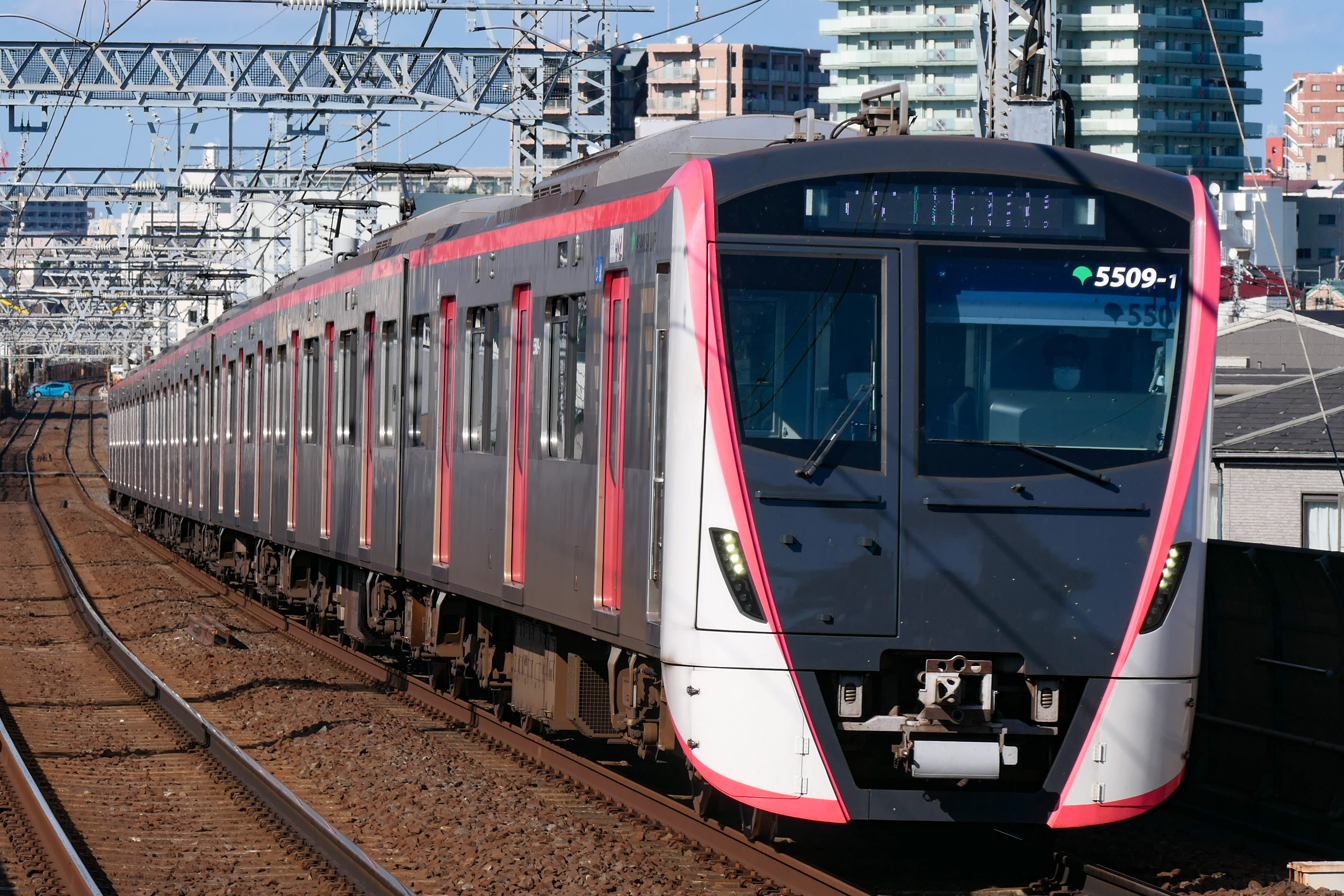
5500 series

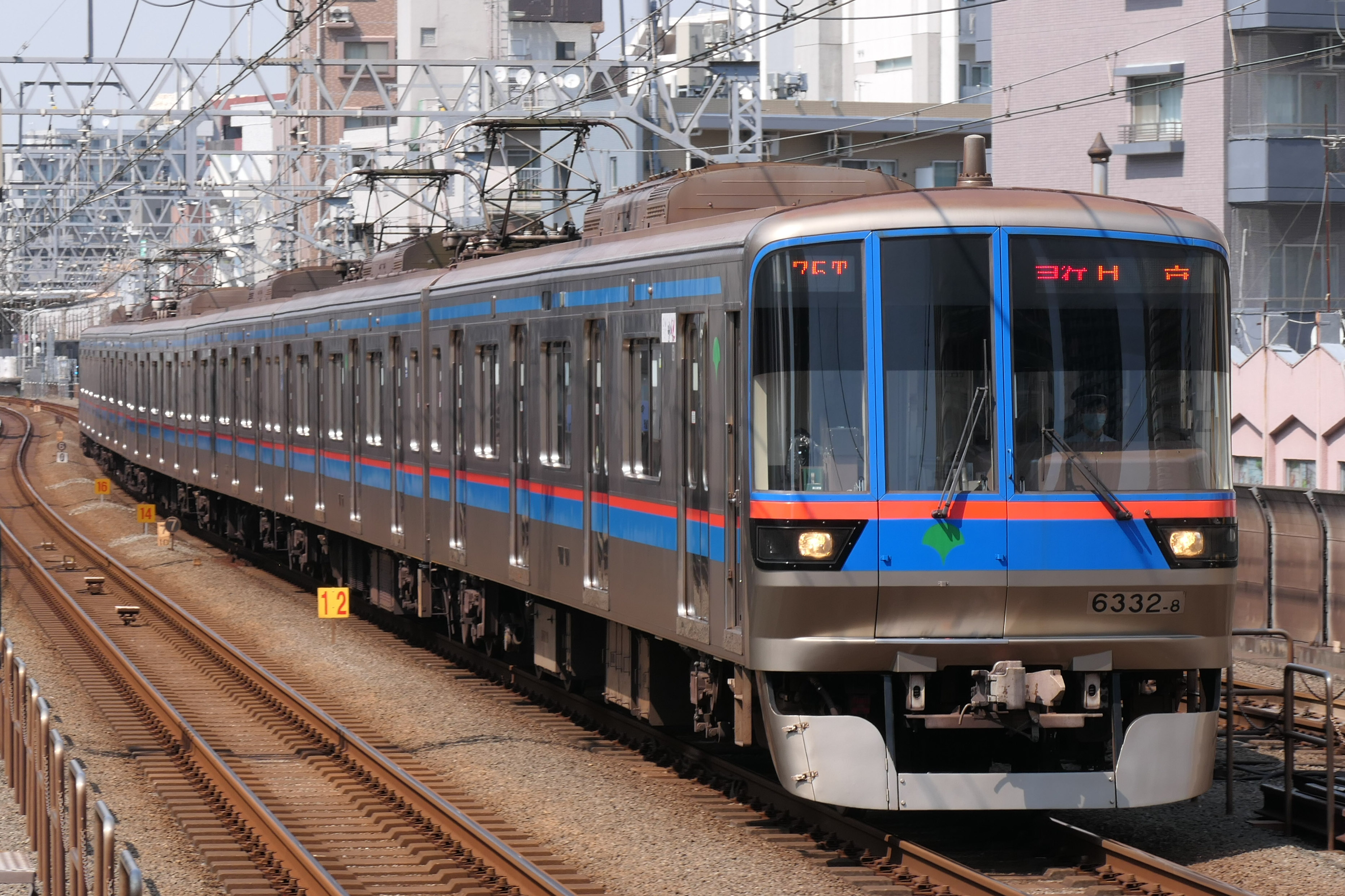
6300 series

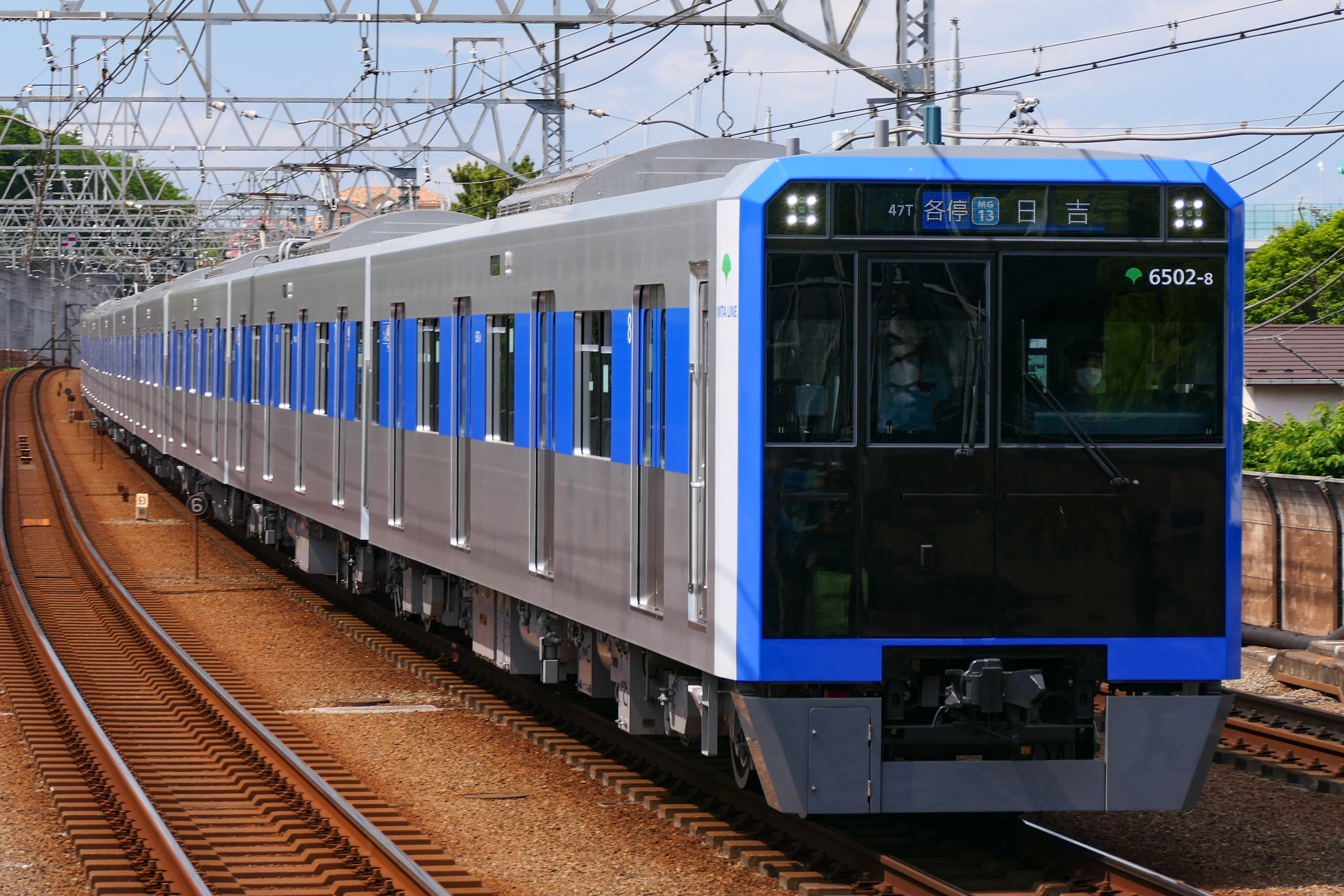
6500 series

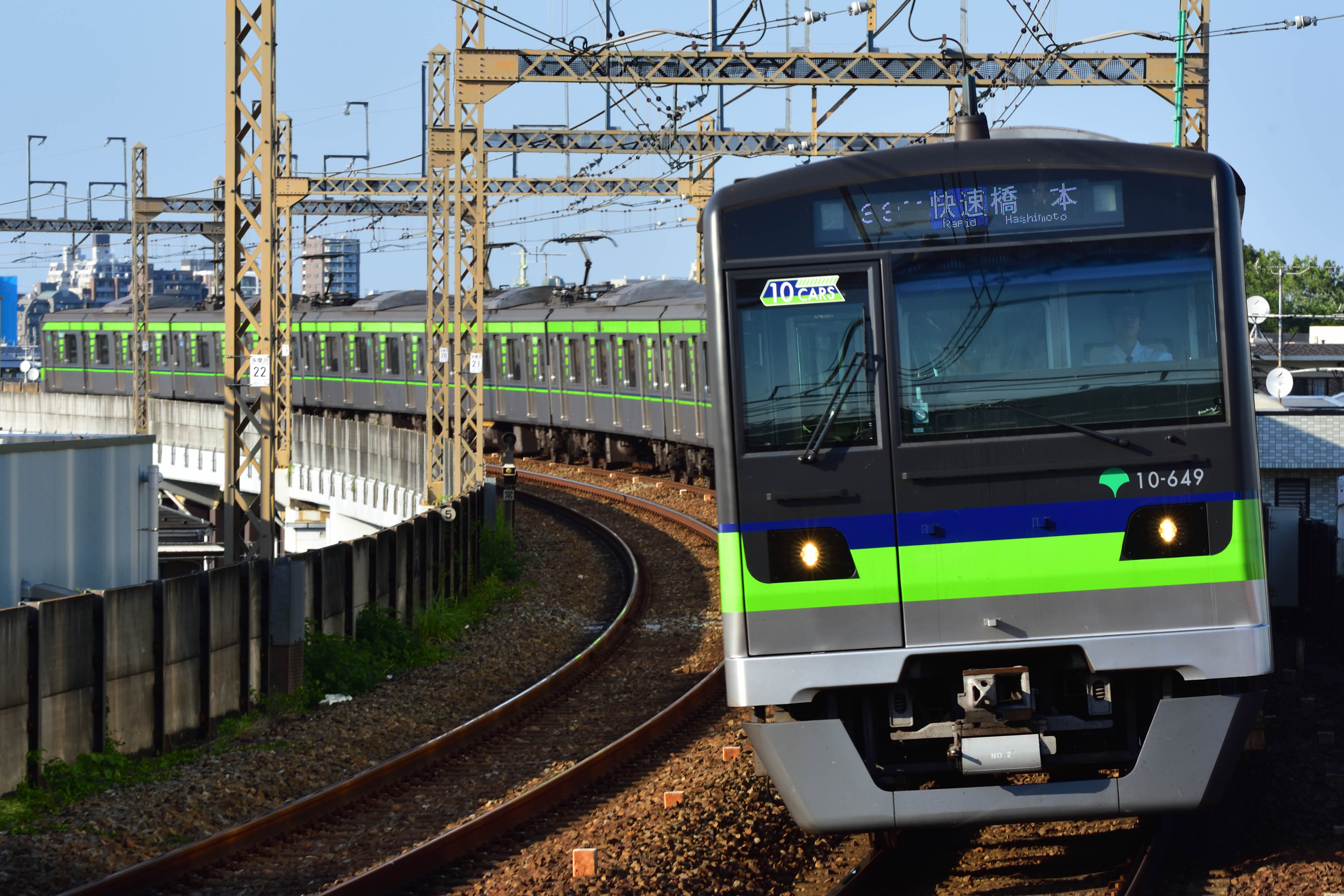
10-300 series

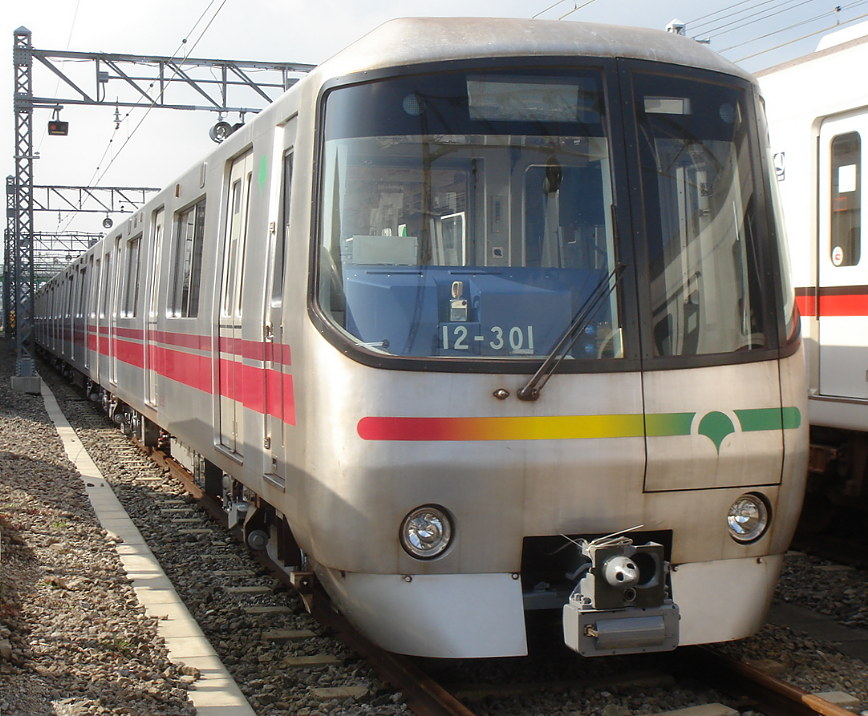
12-000 series

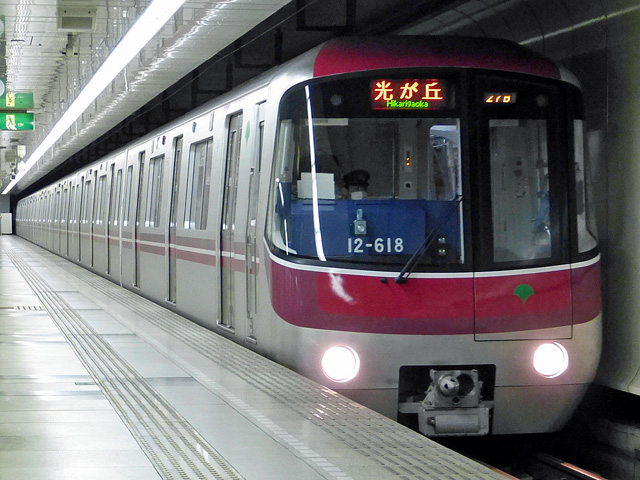
12-600 series

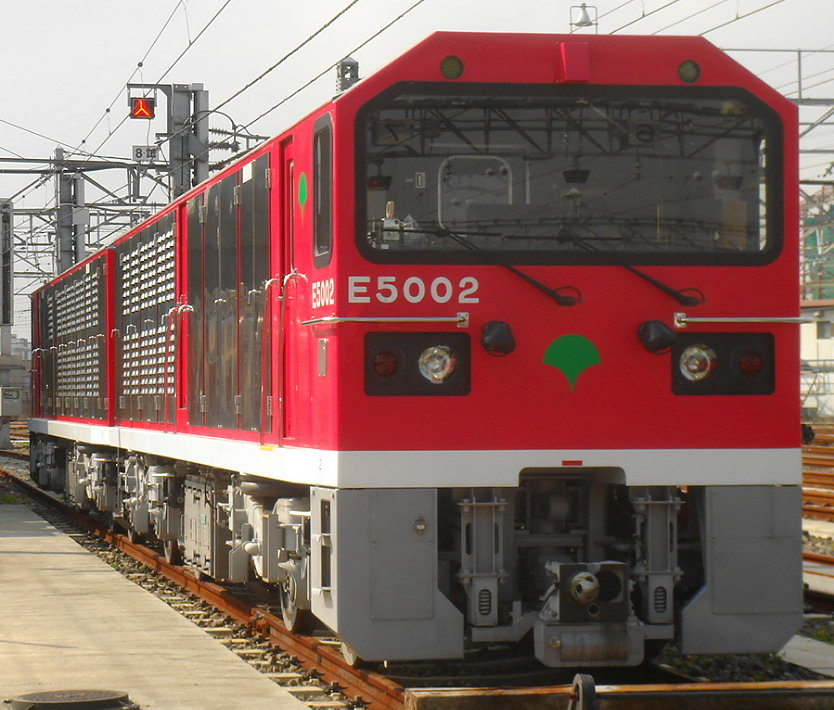
E5000 series

=== Former vehicles ===
- Asakusa Line – 5000 series, 5200 series and 5300 series
- Mita Line – 6000 series and 10-000 series
- Shinjuku Line – 10-000 series and 10-300R series
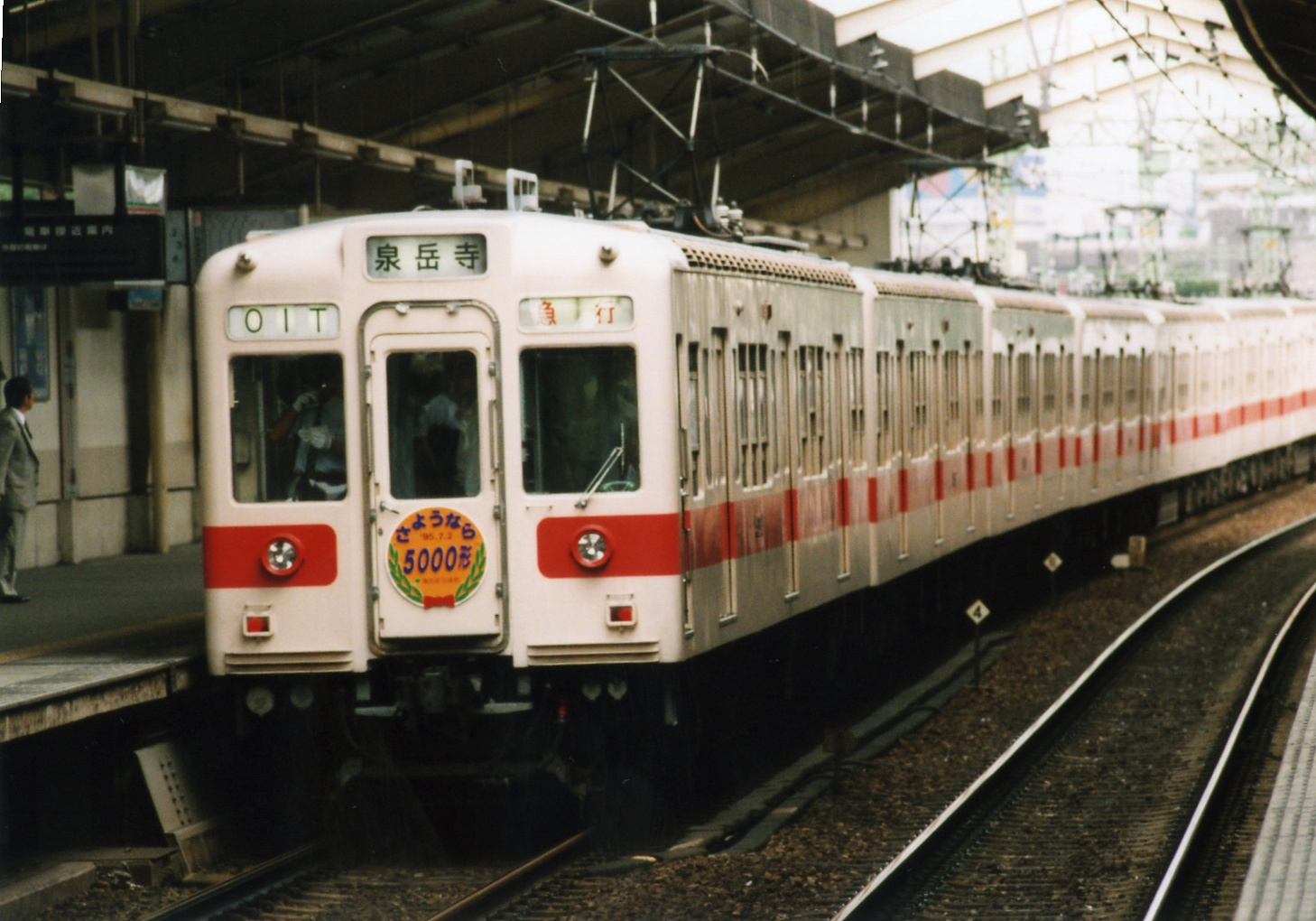
5000 series

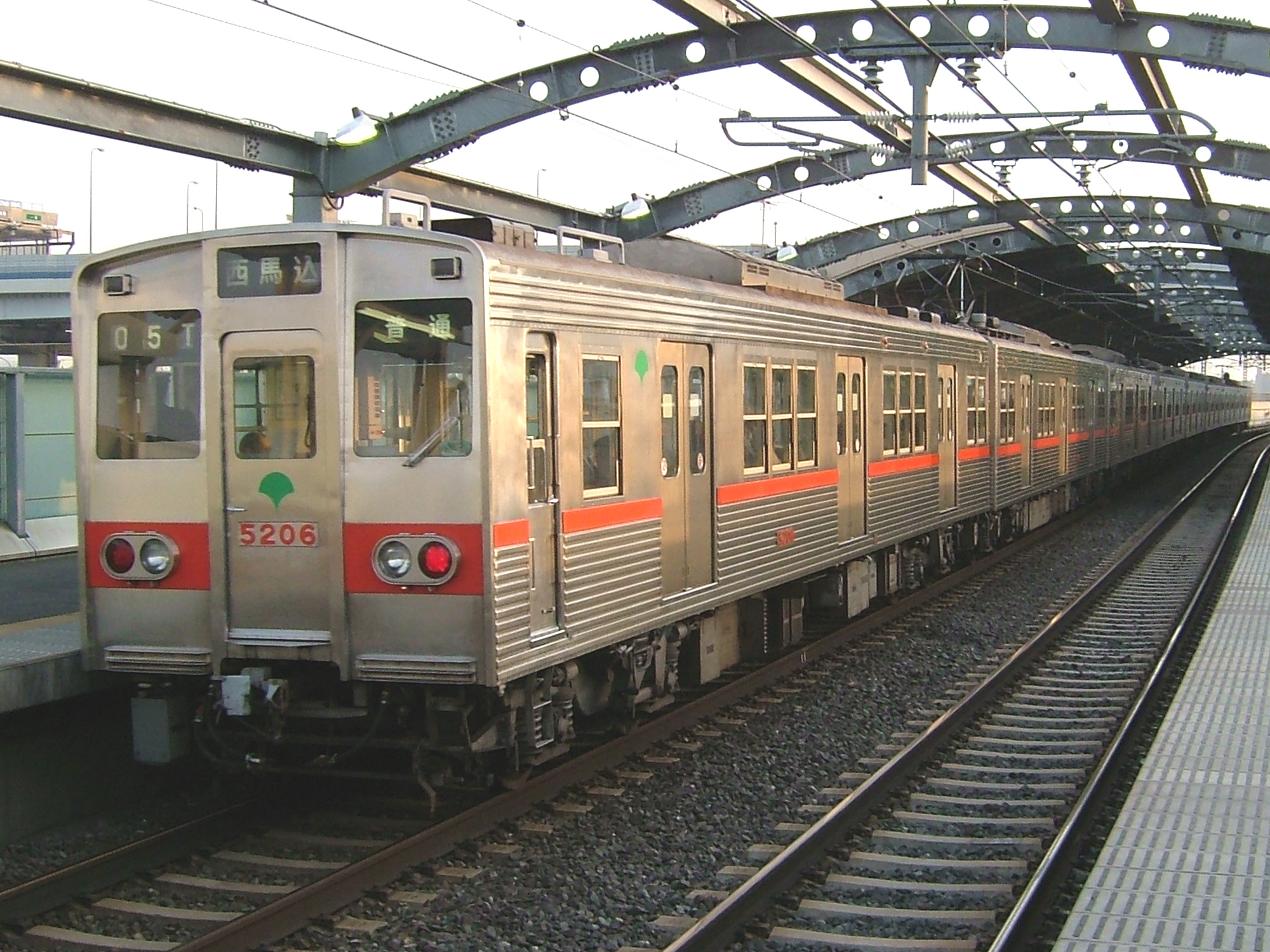
5200 series

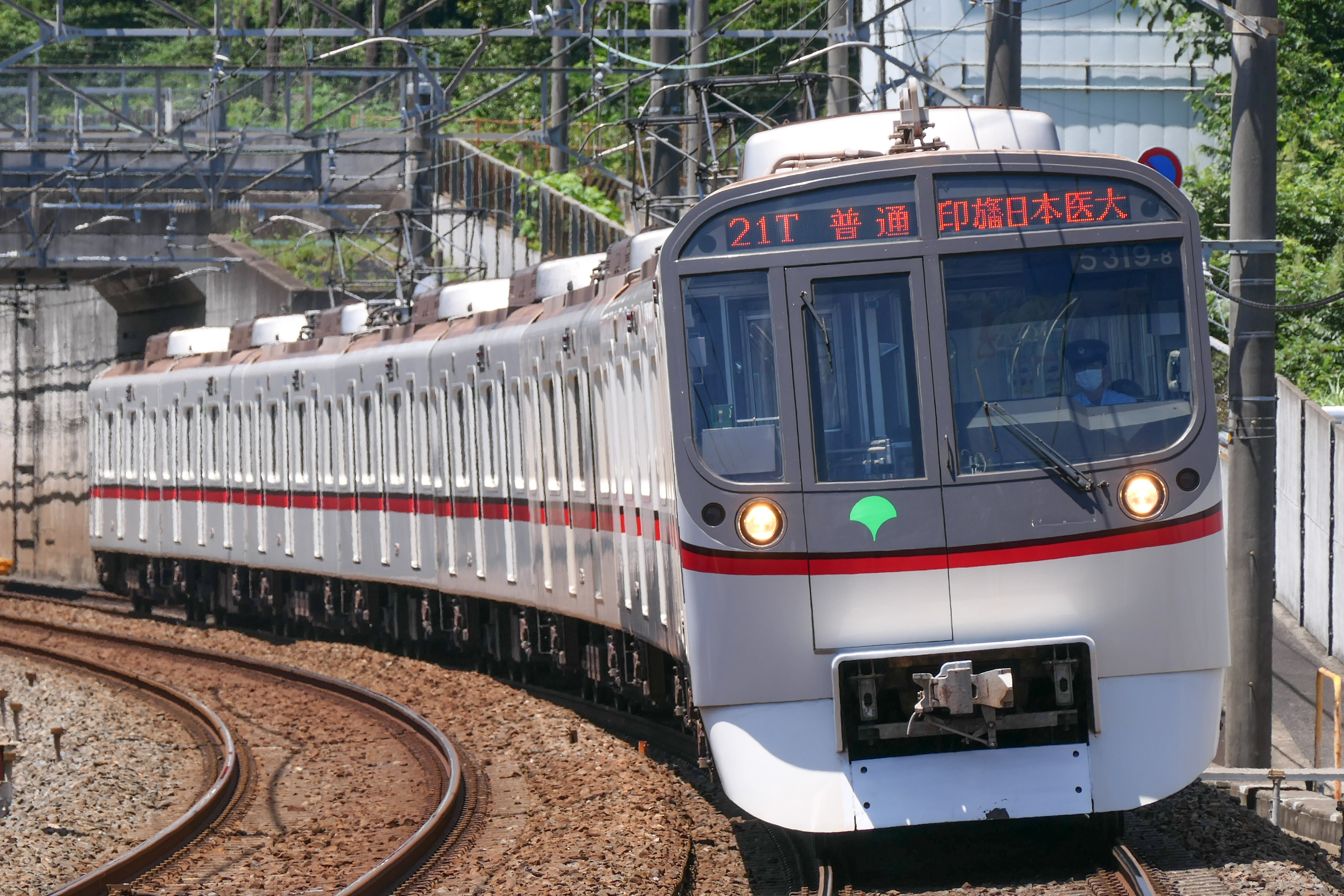
5300 series

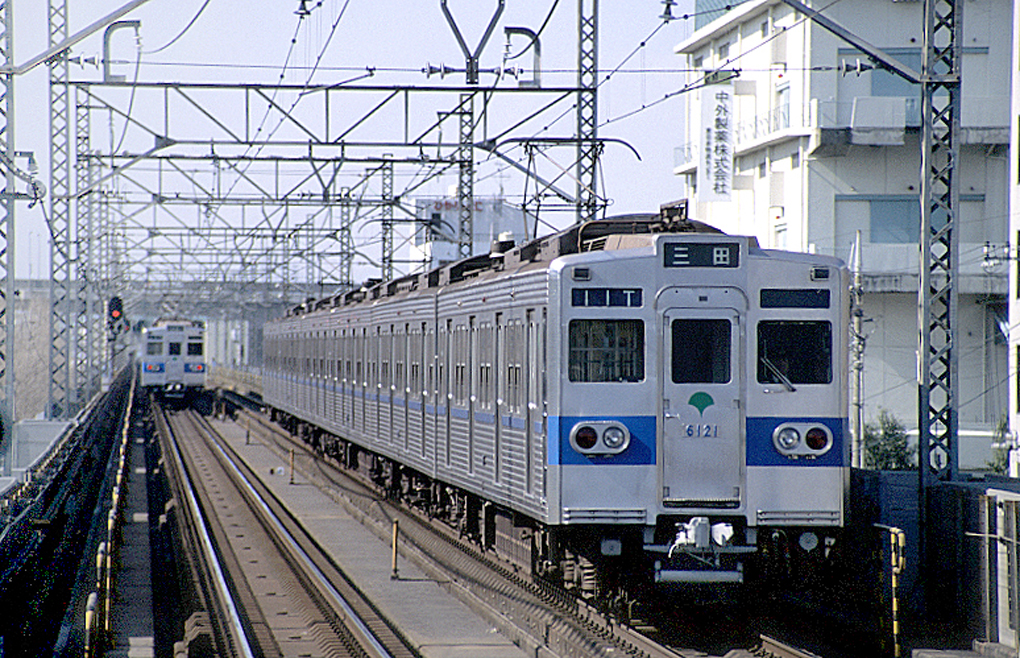
6000 series

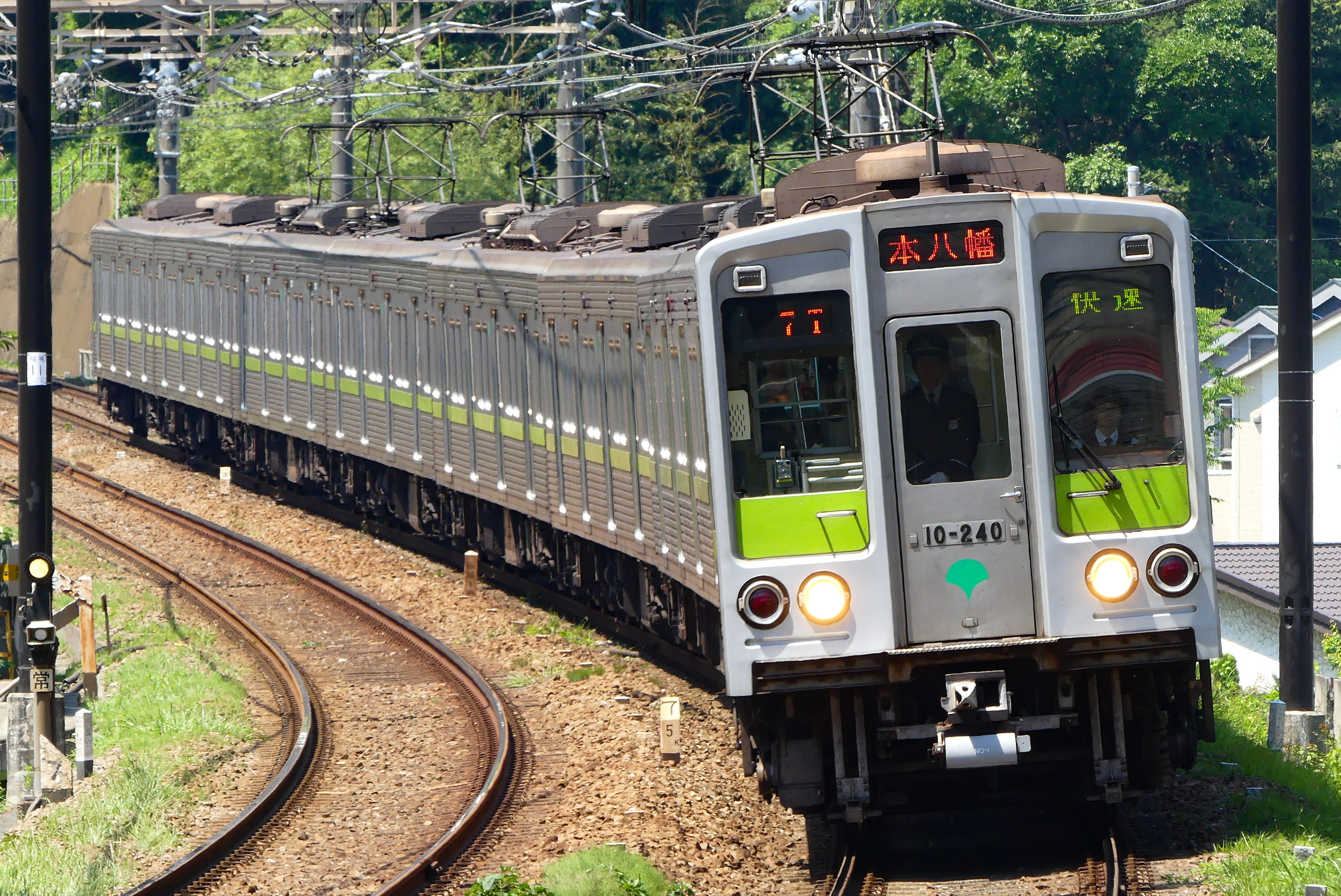
10-000 series

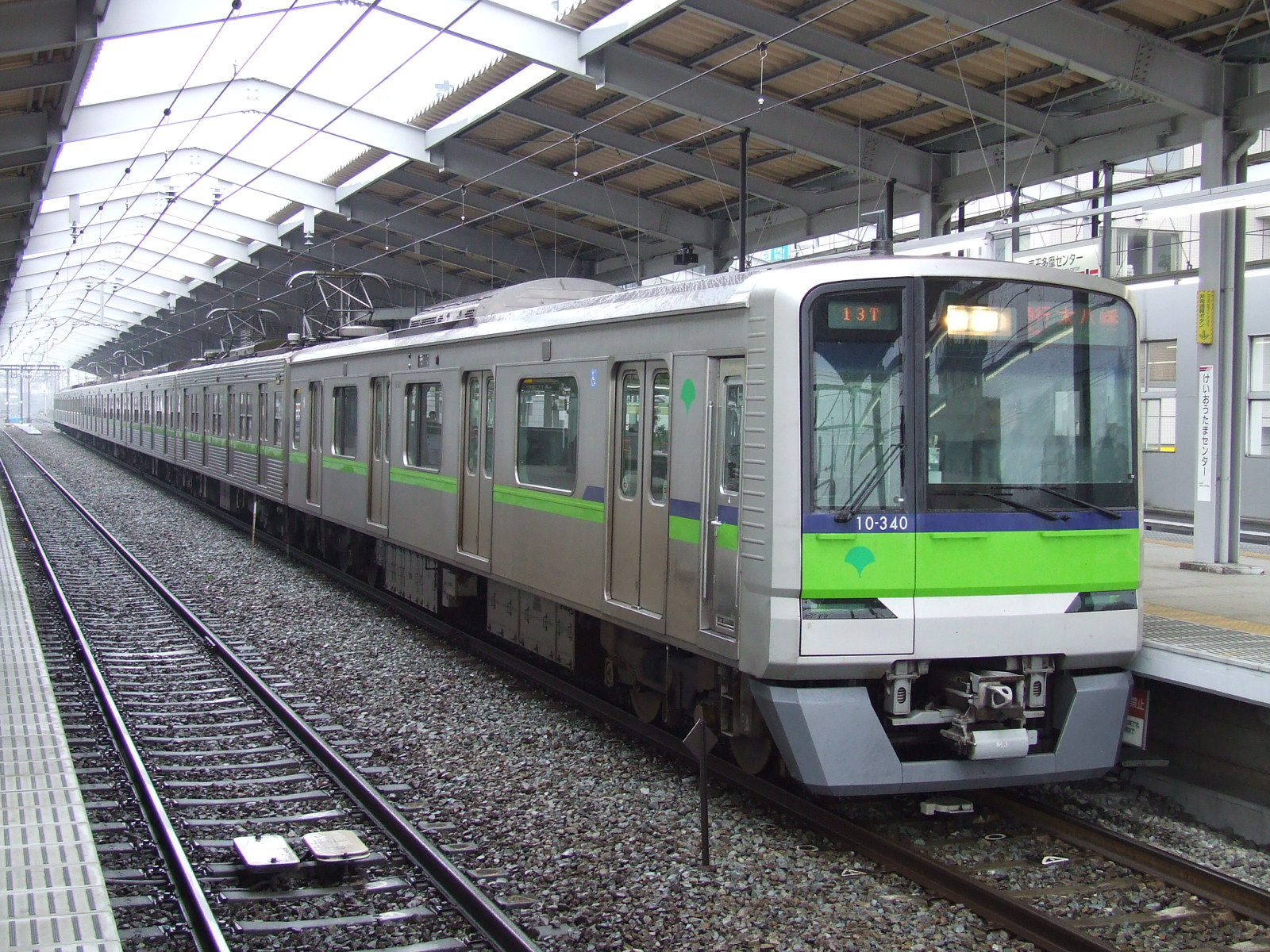
10-300R series

== See also ==
- List of Toei Subway stations
- Tokyo Metropolitan Subway Construction Company
- Tokyo Metro
- List of Tokyo Metro stations
- List of urban rail systems in Japan
- List of metro systems
