= Komuro Station =

Railway station in Funabashi, Chiba Prefecture, Japan

HS11 Komuro Station 小室駅
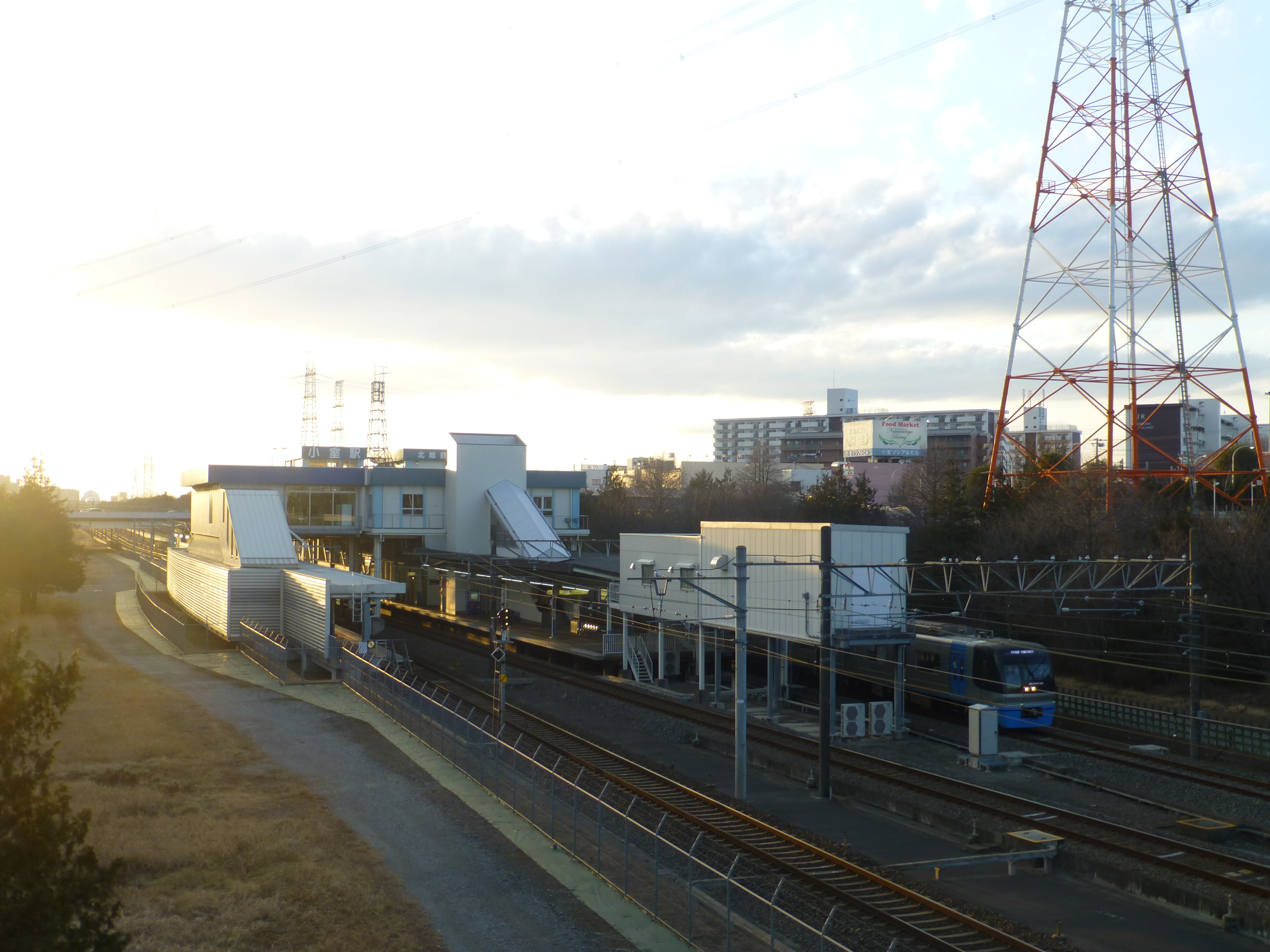
- Komuro Station, February 2016

General information
- Location: 1400 Komuro-cho, Funabashi-shi, Chiba-ken 270-1471; Japan
- Coordinates: 35.7868°N 140.0763°E
- Operator: Hokusō Railway
- Line: Hokusō Line
- Distance: 19.8 km from Keisei-Takasago
- Platforms: 1 island + 1 side platform

Other information
- Station code: HS11
- Website: Official website

History
- Opened: 8 March 1979

Passengers
- FY2018: 3,984 daily

Services
Preceding station	Hokusō Railway	Following station
Shiroi HS10 towards Keisei Takasago	Hokusō Line Limited Express Local	Chiba New Town Chūō HS12 towards Imba Nihon-idai
Location
- Location within Chiba Prefecture Location within Japan

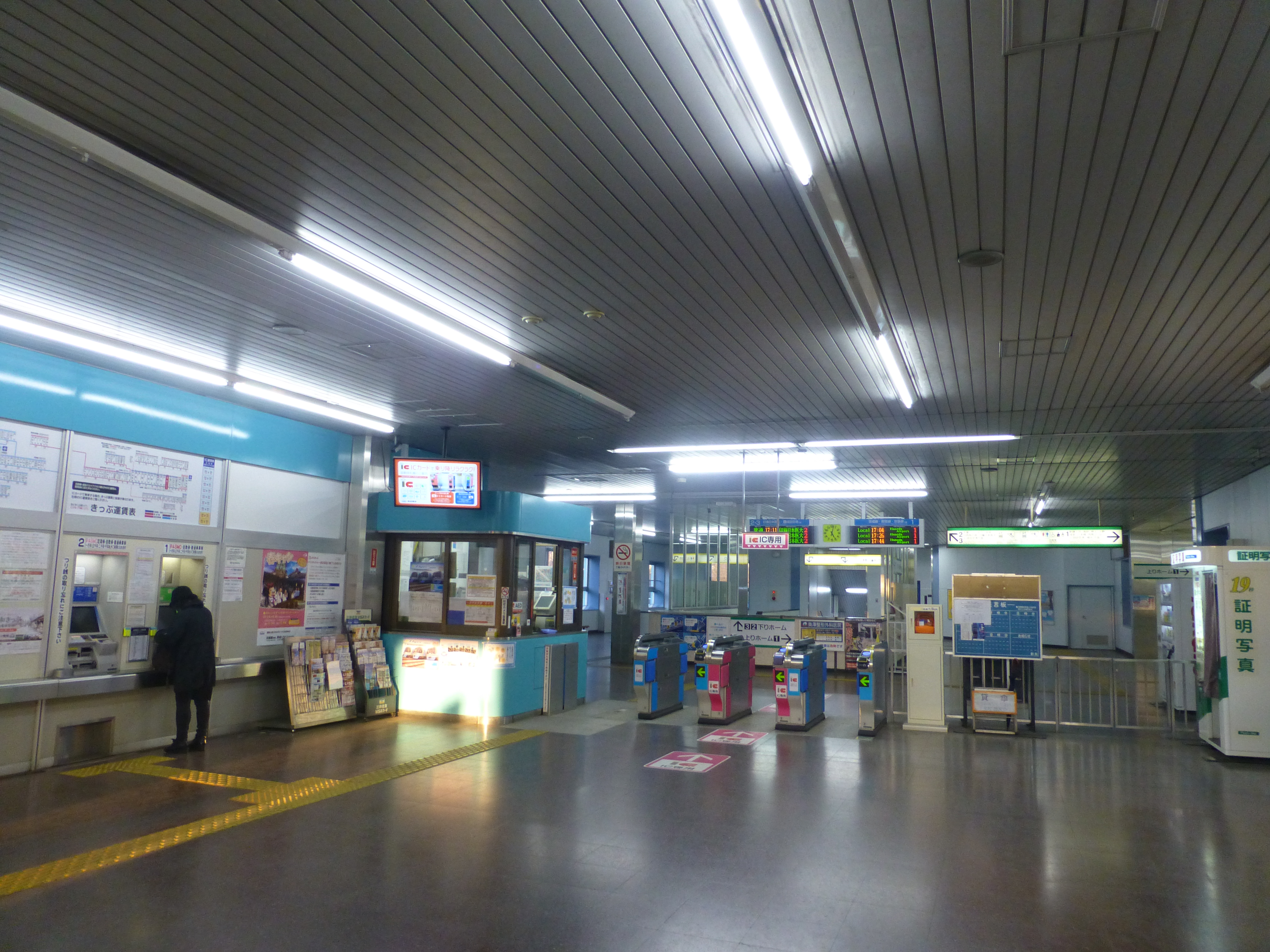
Ticket gates, 2016

Komuro Station (小室駅, Komuro-eki) is a passenger railway station in the city of Funabashi, Chiba, Japan, operated by the third sector Hokusō Railway.

== Lines ==
Komuro Station is served by the Hokusō Line and is located 19.8 kilometers from the terminus of the line at Keisei-Takasago.

== Station layout ==
This station consists of one ground-level island platform and one side platform serving three tracks, with the station building built above.

=== Platforms ===
1	■ Hokusō Line	for Keisei-Takasago, Oshiage, and Haneda Airport
2,3	■ Hokusō Line	for Imba Nihon-idai, and Narita Airport

== History ==
Komuro Station was opened on 8 March 1979. On 17 July 2010 a station numbering system was introduced to the Hokusō Line, with the station designated HS11.

== Passenger statistics ==
In fiscal 2018, the station was used by an average of 3,984 passengers daily.

== Surrounding area ==
- Funabashi City Komuro Public Hall
- National Route 16
- National Route 464
- Chiba New Town

== See also ==
- List of railway stations in Japan
