= Chiba New Town Railway 9100 series =

Class of 3 Japanese 8-car electric multiple units

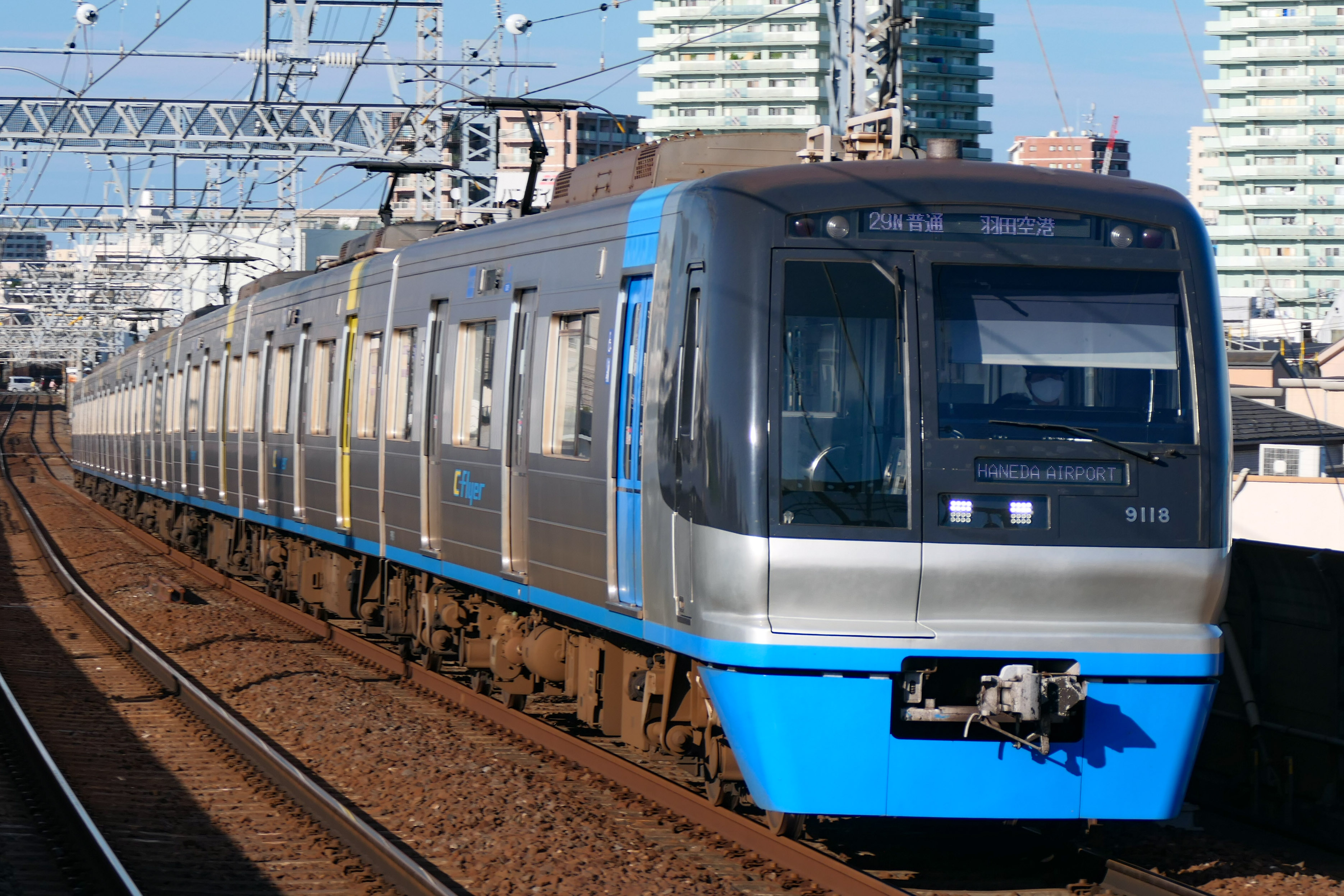
- Set 9111 in July 2021
- In service: 1994–present
- Manufacturer: Nippon Sharyo
- Built at: Toyokawa
- Constructed: 1994, 2000
- Entered service: 1994
- Number built: 24 vehicles (3 sets)
- Number in service: 24 vehicles (3 sets)
- Formation: 8 cars per trainset
- Fleet numbers: 9101–9121
- Operator: Hokuso Railway
- Depot: Inba
- Lines served: Hokuso Line; Keisei Main Line; Keisei Oshiage Line; Toei Asakusa Line; Keikyu Main Line; Keikyu Airport Line

Specifications
- Car body construction: Stainless steel
- Car length: 18,000 mm (59 ft 1 in)
- Width: 2,780 mm (9 ft 1 in)
- Doors: 3 pairs per side
- Maximum speed: 120 km/h (75 mph)
- Traction system: GTO–VVVF (TDK6172A)
- Power output: 130 kW x 4 per motor car
- Acceleration: 3.5 km/(h⋅s) (2.2 mph/s)
- Deceleration: 4 km/(h⋅s) (2.5 mph/s) (service); 4.5 km/(h⋅s) (2.8 mph/s) (emergency)
- Electric system: 1,500 V DC
- Current collection: Overhead catenary
- Bogies: FS-547 (motored), FS-047 (trailer)
- Safety system: ATS
- Track gauge: 1,435 mm (4 ft 8 1/2 in)

The Chiba New Town Railway 9100 series (千葉ニュータウン鉄道9100形) is a commuter electric multiple unit (EMU) train type owned by the third-sector railway company Chiba New Town Railway and operated by the Hokuso Railway on the Hokuso Line in Japan since 1994. The trains are nicknamed "C-Flyer", with the "C" standing for Chiba.

== Operations ==
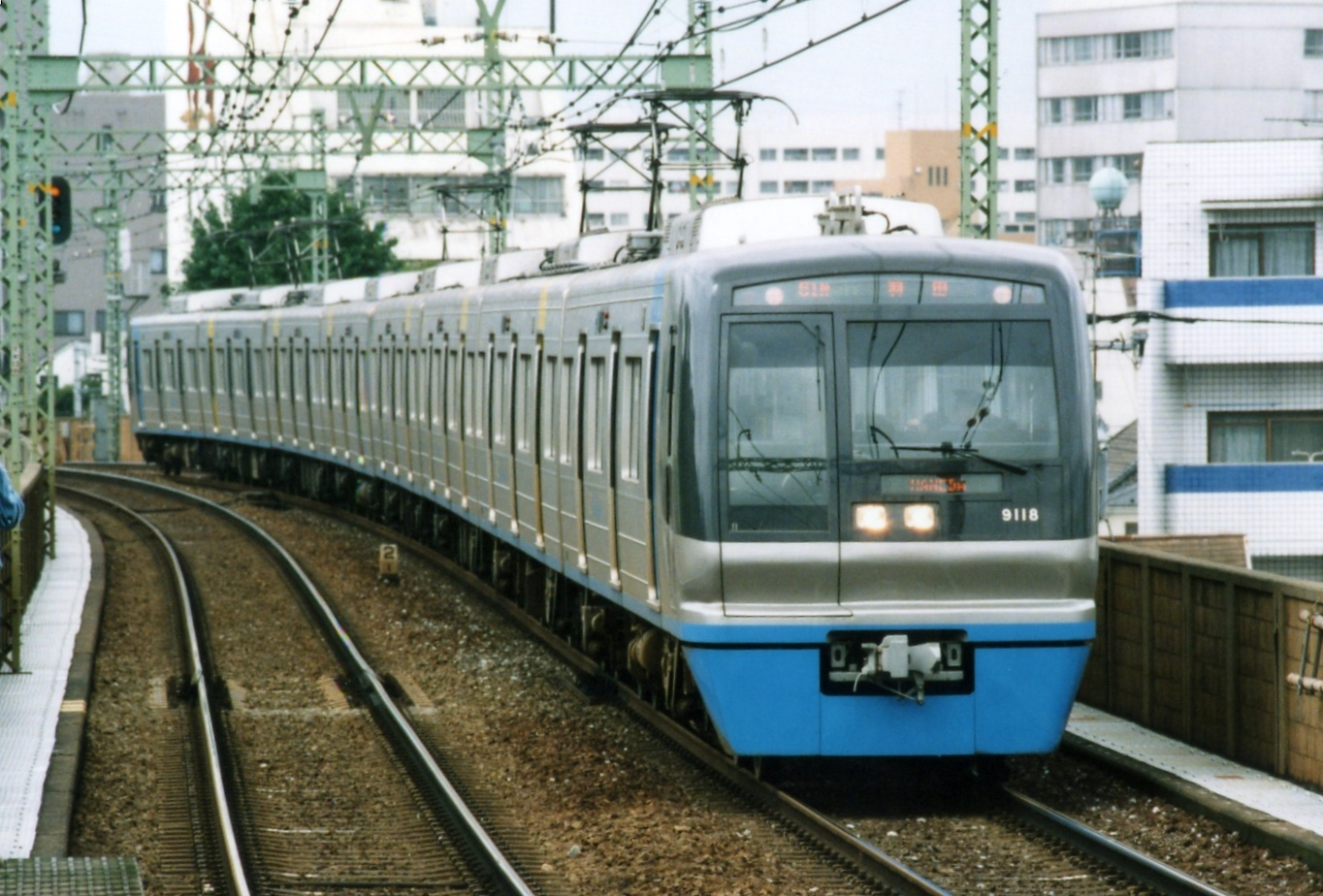
Set 9111 on the Keikyu Main Line in July 1995

The 9100 series trains are used on the following lines.

- Hokuso Line (Keisei-Takasago - Inba-Nihon-Idai)
- Keisei Main Line (Keisei-Takasago - Aoto)
- Keisei Oshiage Line (Aoto - Oshiage)
- Toei Asakusa Line (Oshiage - Sengakuji)
- Keikyu Main Line (Sengakuji - Keikyu Kamata)
- Keikyu Airport Line (Keikyu Kamata - Haneda Airport Domestic Terminal)

== Formation ==
As of 1 April 2013, the fleet consists of three eight-car sets, formed as shown below, with six motored (M) cars and two trailer (T) cars, and car 1 at the southern end.

Car No.	1	2	3	4	5	6	7	8
Designation	M2c	M1	T	M1'	M2	T	M1	M2c
Numbering	91x8	91x7	91x6	91x5	91x4	91x3	91x2	91x1
Weight (t)	34.0		30.0	34.0	32.0	30.0	34.0	
Capacity (Total/seated)	121/41	132/50	131/50	132/50		131/50	132/50	121/41

The "M1" cars each have two pantographs, and the "M1'" car has one.

== Interior ==
Passenger accommodation consists mostly of longitudinal bench seating, with some transverse seats at the car ends. The end cars each have a wheelchair space. The 1st-batch sets, 9101 and 9111, originally had public phones located in cars 3 and 6, but these were removed in 1997.

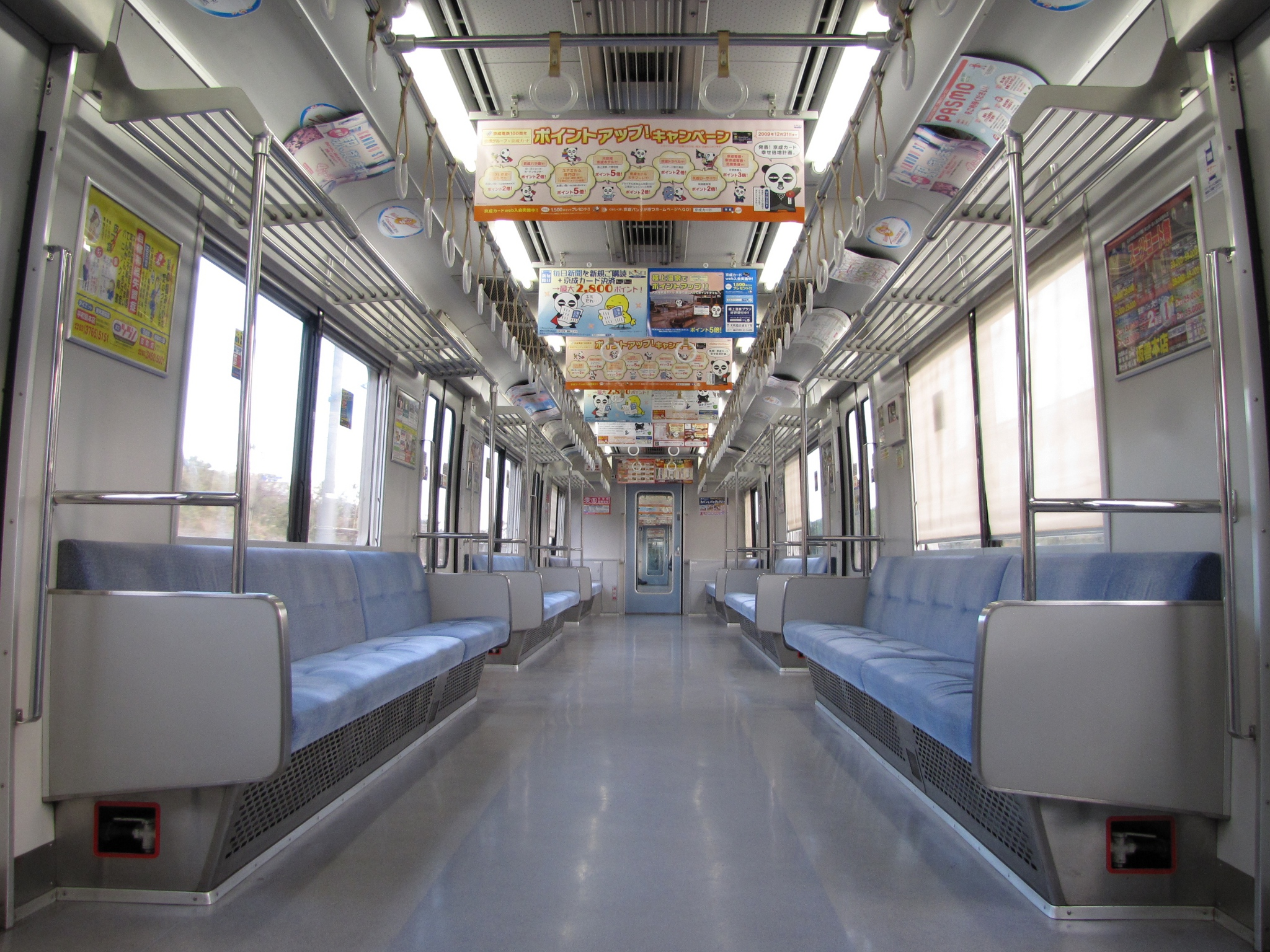
Interior view of car 9117 in December 2009

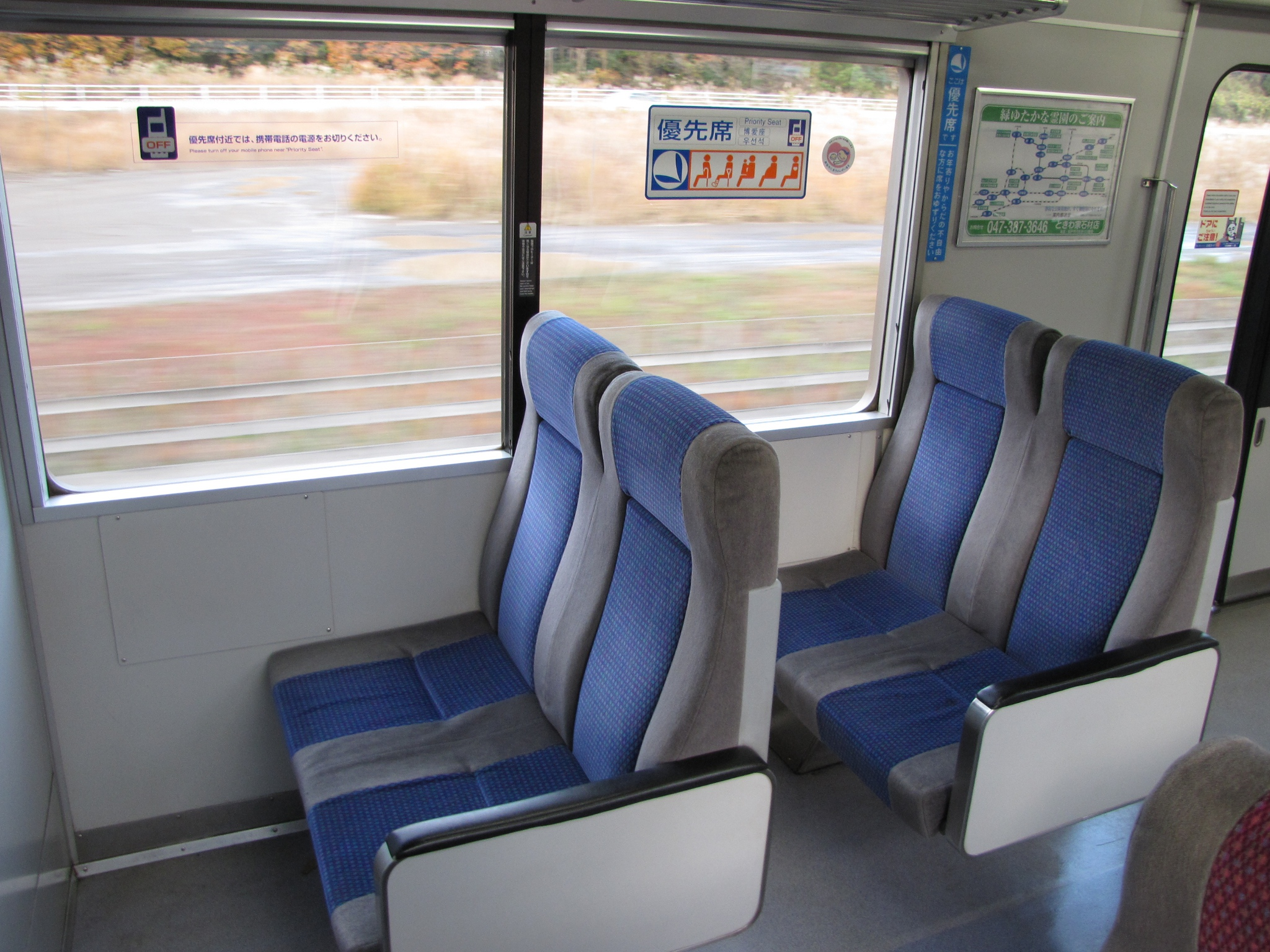
Transverse priority seating in car 9117 in December 2009

== History ==
The first two sets, 9101 and 9111, were built by Nippon Sharyo in Toyokawa, Aichi, and delivered in 1994, ahead of the extension of the Hokuso Line from Chiba New Town Chūō to Inzai-Makinohara in 1995. A third, 2nd-batch set, 9121, was delivered in 2000, coinciding with the extension of the line from Inzai-Makinohara to Inba-Nihon-Idai.
