= 9100 =

9100 may refer to:

- A.D. 9100, a year in the 10th millennium CE
- 9100 BCE, a year in the 10th millennium BC
- 9100, a number in the 9000 (number) range
- 9100 Tomohisa, an asteroid in the Asteroid Belt, the 9100th asteroid registered; see List_of_minor_planets:_9001–10000
- Holborn 9100, a Dutch personal computer
- CP Class 9100, a diesel railcar class
- Chiba New Town Railway 9100 series electric multiple unit train series
- Meitetsu 9100 series trains
- Qtek 9100, a branded version of the HTC Wizard smartphone
