= Shiroi Station =

Railway station in Shiroi, Chiba Prefecture, Japan

HS10 Shiroi Station 白井駅
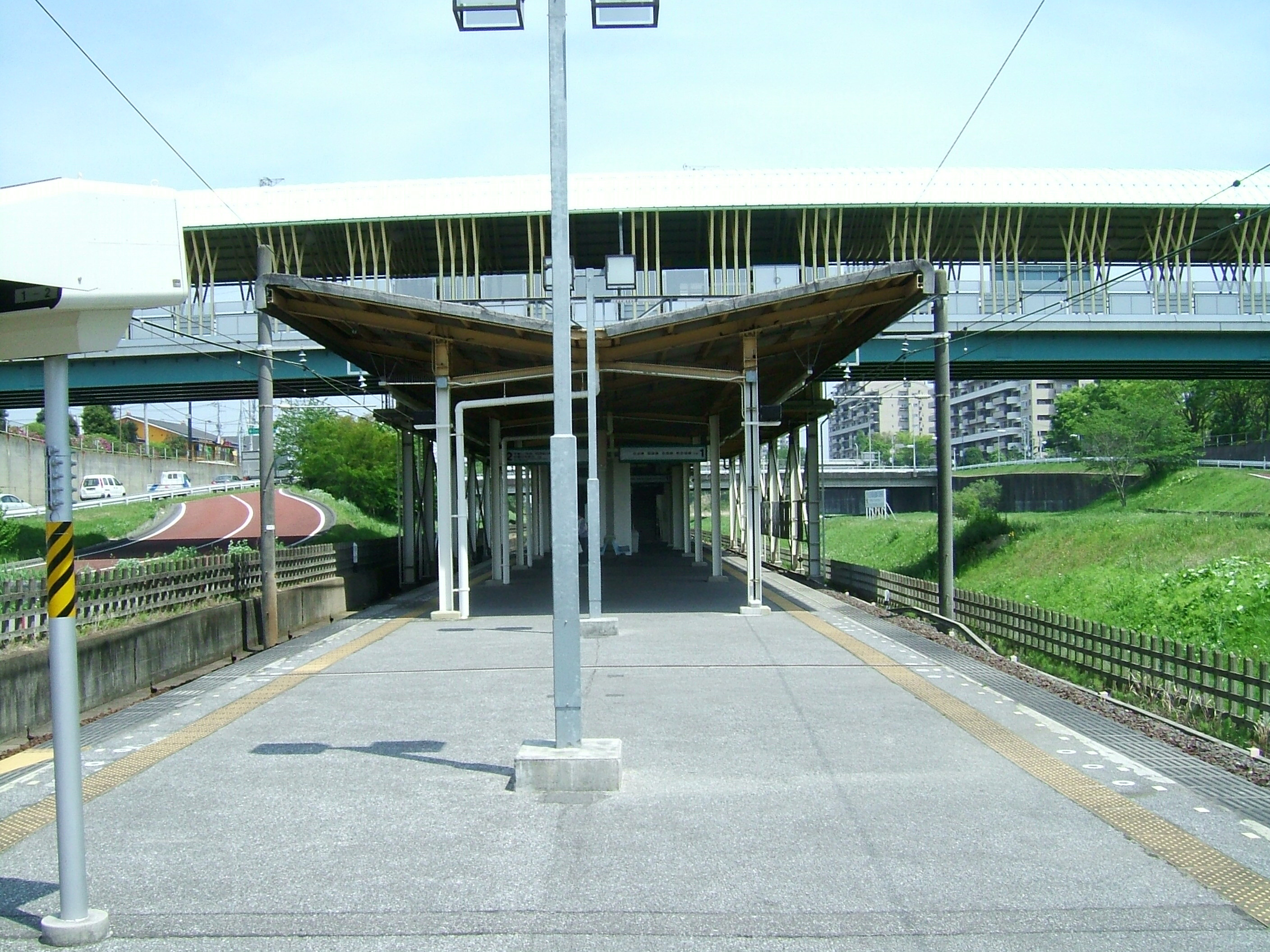
- Shiroi Station, May 2007

General information
- Location: 620 Fuku, Shiroi-shi, Chiba-ken 271-0096; Japan
- Coordinates: 35.7848°N 140.0543°E
- Operator: Hokusō Railway
- Line: Hokusō Line
- Distance: 17.8 km from Keisei-Takasago
- Platforms: 1 island platform

Other information
- Status: Staffed
- Station code: HS10
- Website: Official website

History
- Opened: 9 March 1979

Passengers
- FY2018: 9,048

Services
Preceding station	Hokusō Railway	Following station
Nishi-Shiroi HS09 towards Keisei Takasago	Hokusō Line Limited Express Local	Komuro HS11 towards Imba Nihon-idai
Location
- Location within Chiba Prefecture Location within Japan

Shiroi Station (白井駅, Shiroi-eki) is a passenger railway station in the city of Shiroi, Chiba Prefecture, Japan. It is operated by the third-sector railway operator Hokusō Railway.

== Lines ==
Shiroi Station is served by the Hokusō Line and is located 17.8 kilometers from the terminus of the line at Keisei-Takasago.

== Station layout ==
This station consists of a single ground-level island platform serving two tracks, with the station building built above.

=== Platforms ===
1	■ Hokusō Line	for Higashi-Matsudo, Shin-Kamagaya , Keisei-Takasago, Oshiage, Ueno, Shinagawa, and Haneda Airport Domestic Terminal
2	■ Hokusō Line	for Imba Nihon-idai, and Narita Airport

== History ==
Shiroi Station was opened on 9 March 1979. On 17 July 2010, a station numbering system was introduced to the Hokusō Line, with the station designated HS10.

== Passenger statistics ==
In fiscal year of 2018, the station was used by an average of 9,048 passengers daily.

== Surrounding area ==
- Shiroi City Hall
- Shiroi Cultural Center
- Shiroi Post Office

== See also ==
- List of railway stations in Japan
