= Matsuhidai Station =

Railway station in Matsudo, Chiba Prefecture, Japan

HS06 Matsuhidai Station 松飛台駅
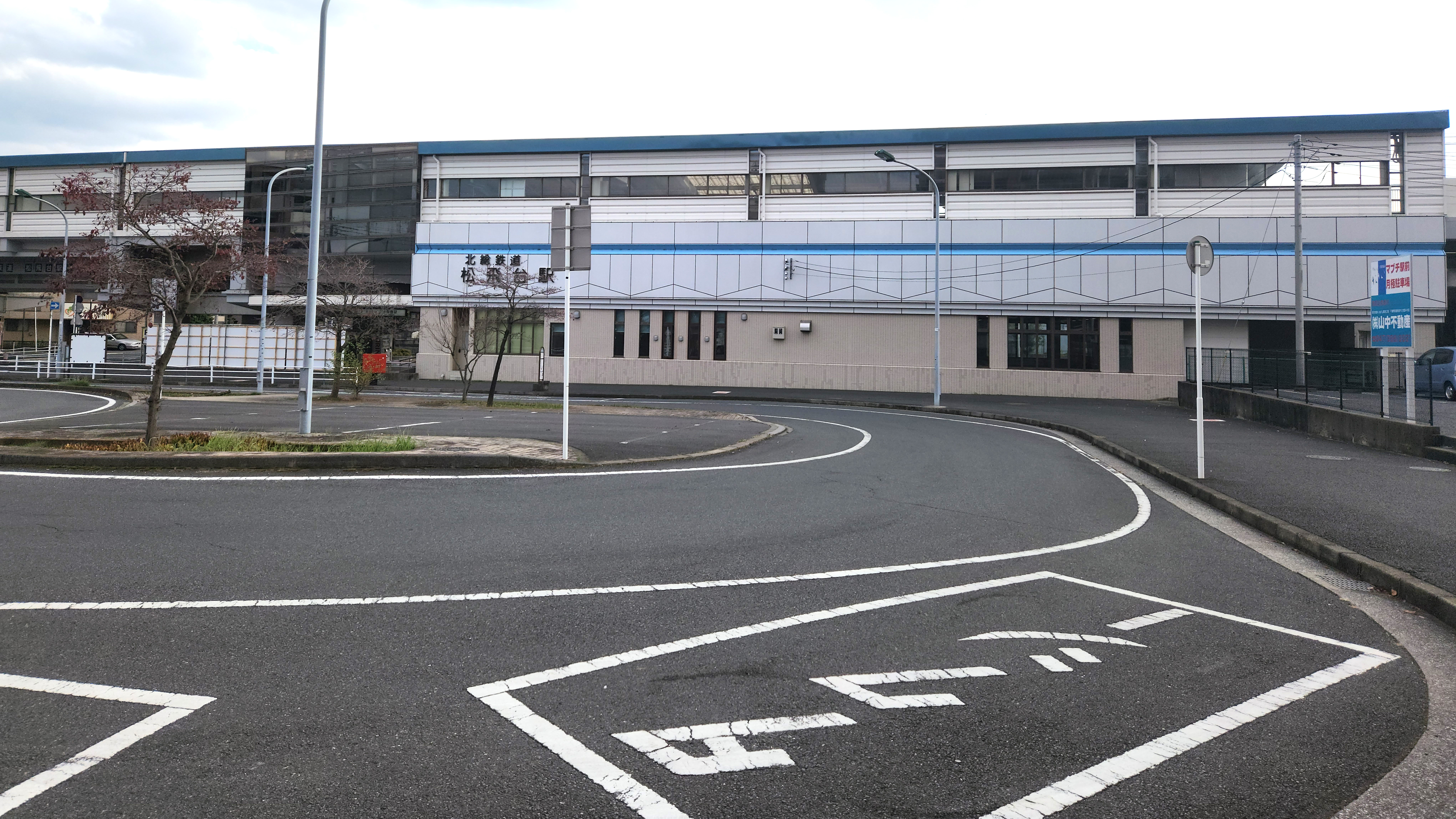
- North-side building of Matsuhidai Station in November 2022

General information
- Location: 29-5 Kamishiki, Matsudo-shi, Chiba-ken 271-0096; Japan
- Coordinates: 35.7756°N 139.9579°E
- Operator: Hokusō Railway
- Line: Hokusō Line
- Distance: 8.9 km from Keisei-Takasago
- Platforms: 2 side platforms

Other information
- Station code: HS06
- Website: Official website

History
- Opened: 31 March 1991

Passengers
- FY2018: 5,218

Services
Preceding station	Hokusō Railway	Following station
Higashi-Matsudo HS05 towards Keisei Takasago	Hokusō Line Local	Ōmachi HS07 towards Imba Nihon-idai
Location
- Location within Chiba Prefecture Location within Japan

Matsuhidai Station (松飛台駅, Matsuhidai-eki) is a passenger railway station in the city of Matsudo, Chiba, Japan, operated by the third sector Hokusō Railway.

== Lines ==
Matsuhidai Station is served by the Hokusō Line and is located 8.9 kilometers from the terminus of the line at Keisei-Takasago.

== Station layout ==
This station consists of two opposed elevated side platforms serving two tracks, with the station building underneath. The station straddles the border between Matsudo and the neighboring city of Ichikawa.

=== Platforms ===
1	■ Hokusō Line	for Higashi-Matsudo, Keisei-Takasago, Oshiage, Ueno, Shinagawa, and Haneda Airport Domestic Terminal
2	■ Hokusō Line	for Shin-Kamagaya , Imba Nihon-idai, and Narita Airport

== History ==
Matsuhidai Station was opened on 31 March 1991. On 17 July 2010 a station numbering system was introduced to the Hokusō Line, with the station designated HS06.

== Passenger statistics ==
In fiscal 2018, the station was used by an average of 5218 passengers daily.

== Surrounding area ==
- Yahashira Cemetery
- Matsudo Minami Post Office
- Mabuchi Motor Company head office

== See also ==
- List of railway stations in Japan
