= Keikyu 1000 series =

Japanese train type

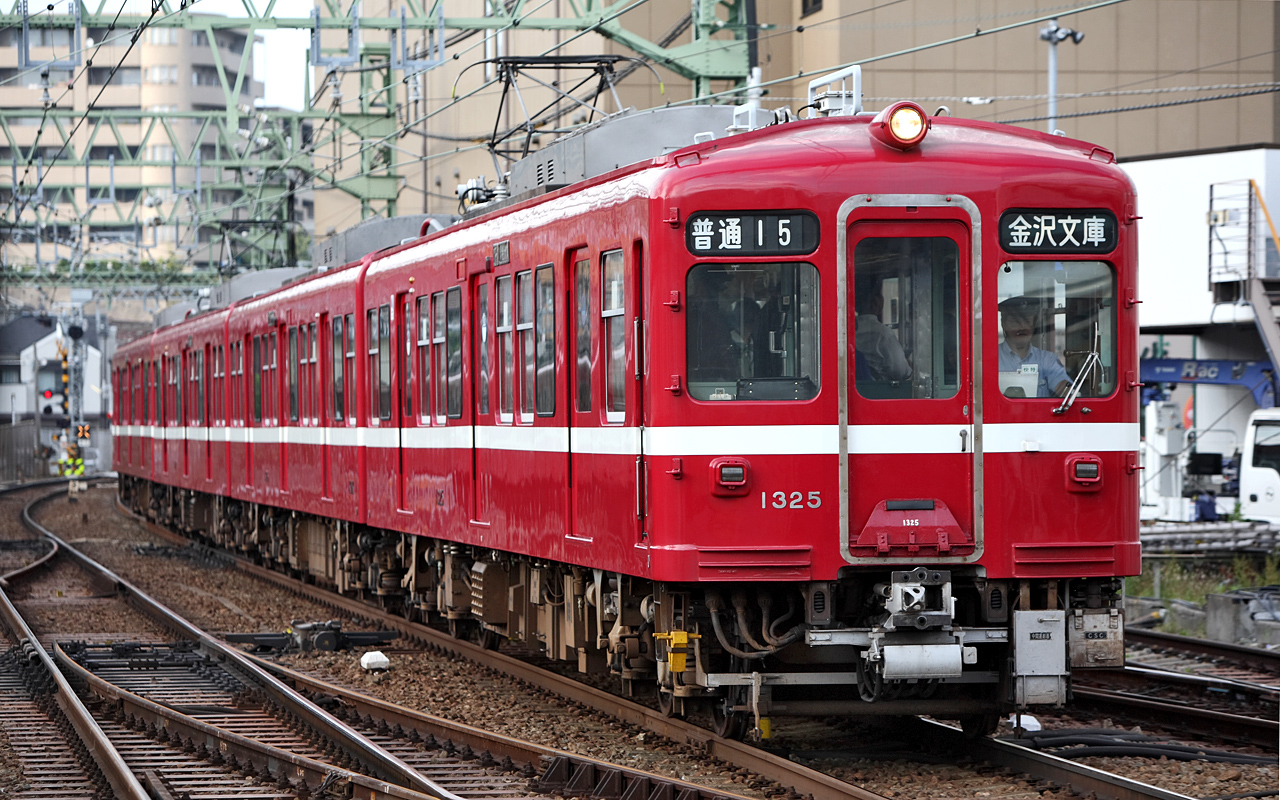
- Set 1325 in May 2008
- In service: 1959–2010
- Manufacturers: Kawasaki Heavy Industries; Tokyu Car Corporation
- Constructed: 1958–1978
- Scrapped: 1986–2010
- Number built: 356 vehicles
- Number in service: None
- Number preserved: 2
- Formation: 2/4/6/8 cars per set
- Capacity: 140 per car
- Operator: Keikyu

Specifications
- Car body construction: Steel
- Car length: 18,000 mm (59 ft 1 in)
- Width: 2,798 mm (9 ft 2 in)
- Height: 4,050 mm (13 ft 3 in)
- Doors: 3 single-leaf sliding doors per side
- Maximum speed: 120 km/h (75 mph)
- Weight: 35 t (including air conditioner)
- Traction system: Resistor control
- Power output: 75 or 90 kW per motor
- Acceleration: 3.5 km/(h⋅s) (2.2 mph/s)
- Deceleration: 4.0 km/(h⋅s) (2.5 mph/s)
- Electric system: 1,500 V DC
- Current collection: Pantograph
- Safety system: C-ATS
- Track gauge: 1,435 mm (4 ft 8 1/2 in)

The Keikyu 1000 series (京急1000形) was a DC electric multiple unit (EMU) train type formerly operated by the private railway operator Keikyu on commuter services in the Tokyo area of Japan from 1959 until June 2010.

== Operations ==
The trains were used on the Keikyu Main Line, Keikyu Airport Line, Keikyu Daishi Line, Keikyu Zushi Line, and Keikyu Kurihama Line. They were also used on Toei Asakusa Line inter-running services until 2008. The last train made its final run in service on the Daishi Line on 28 June 2010.

== Formations ==
The 1000 series fleet consisted of two-, four-, six-, and eight-car sets. By 2010, only four- and six-car sets remained in service, formed as shown below.

=== 6-car sets ===
Designation	M1c	M2	M1	M2	M1	M2c
Numbering	1xxx	1xxx	1xxx	1xxx	1xxx	1xxx

The M1 and M1c cars each had one lozenge-type pantograph.

=== 4-car sets ===
Designation	M1c	M2	M1	M2c
Numbering	1xxx	1xxx	1xxx	1xxx

The M1 and M1c cars each had one lozenge-type pantograph.

== Interior ==
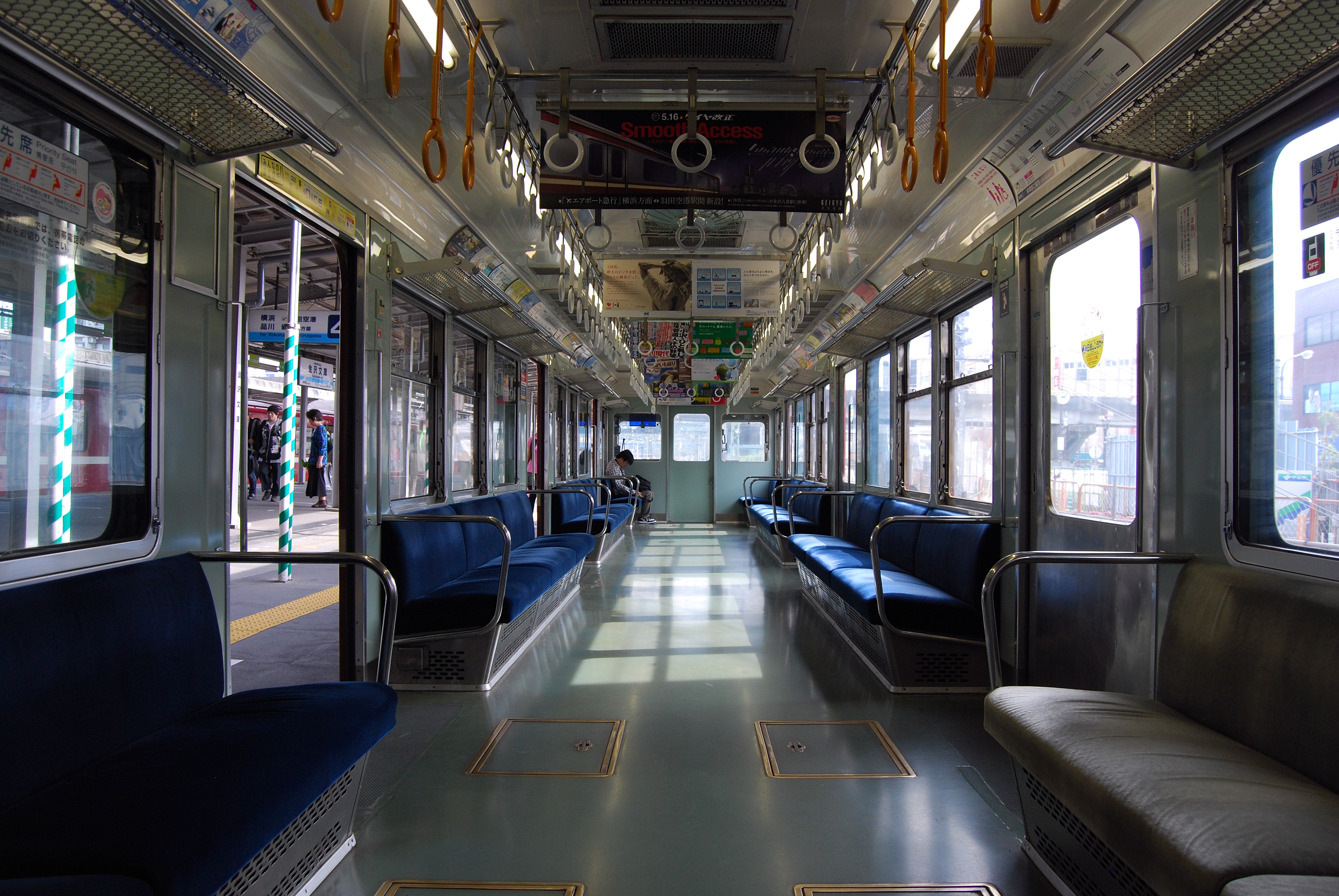
The interior of a driving car in June 2010

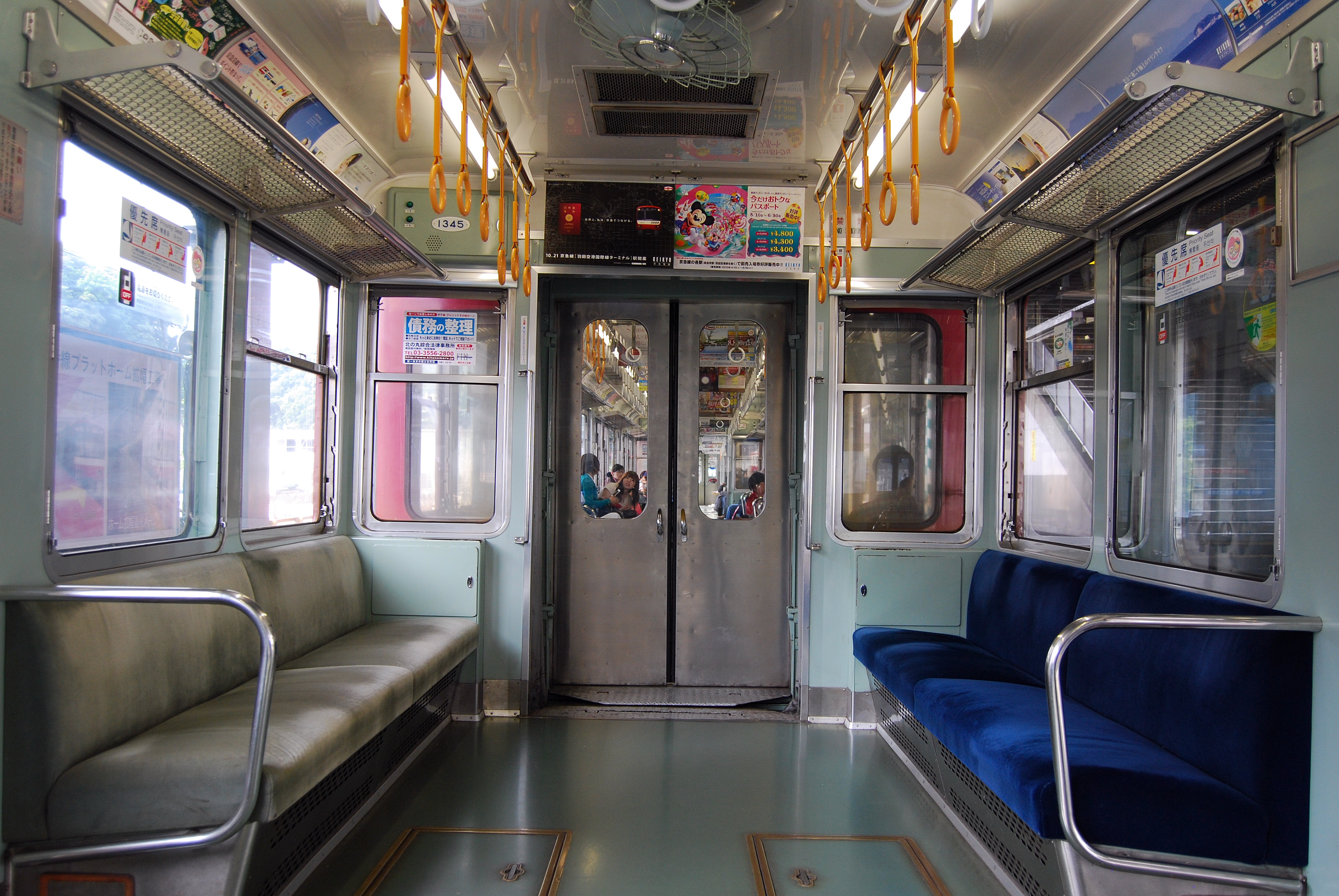
Priority seating (left) in June 2010

== History ==
Four 800 series cars were built in 1958 as prototypes, based on the earlier 700 series design. The type was subsequently reclassified "1000 series", with a further 352 vehicles built from 1959 to 1978. The early batches had non-gangwayed driving cabs with 2 windscreen panes, similar to the 700 series, but later batches included a centre gangway door at the cab ends. Sets built from 1971 onwards had air-conditioning from new, whereas earlier sets were subsequently retrofitted with air-conditioning.

Withdrawals commenced in 1986 with the arrival of 1500 series trains. Beginning in 1995, when the line speed between Shinagawa and Yokohama was raised to 120 km/h (75 mph), the 1000 series fleet was relegated from limited express services as, in spite of the sets' 120 km/h design speed, they were limited to only 110 km/h (68 mph) in service. By September 2001, the fleet had been withdrawn from daytime express services, before being withdrawn from all express services, as well as Toei Asakusa Line through services, by November 2008.

In 2008, one four-car set and one six-car set were repainted in early liveries to mark the 110th anniversary of Keikyu.

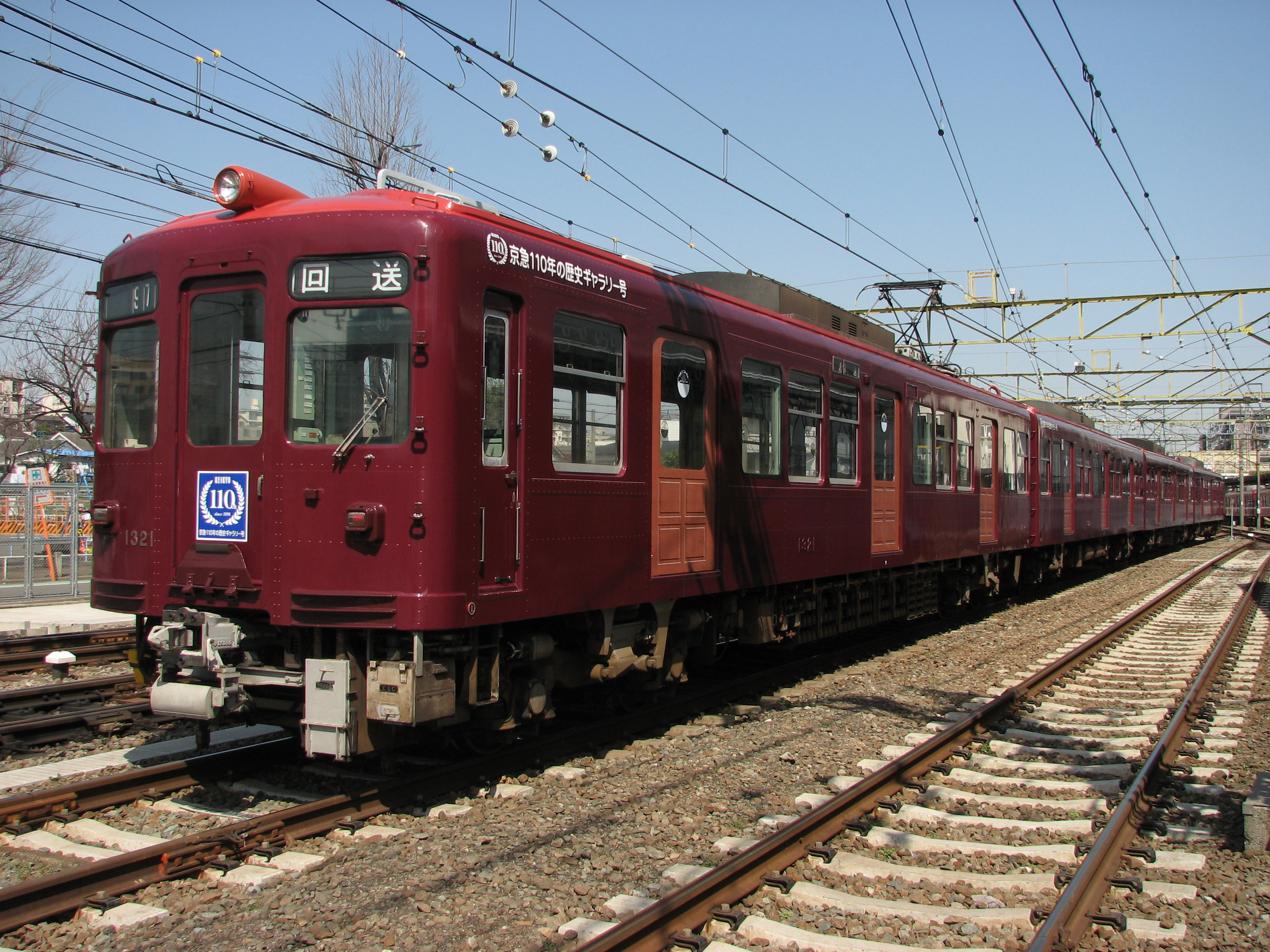
Set 1321 in special "History Gallery" livery in March 2008

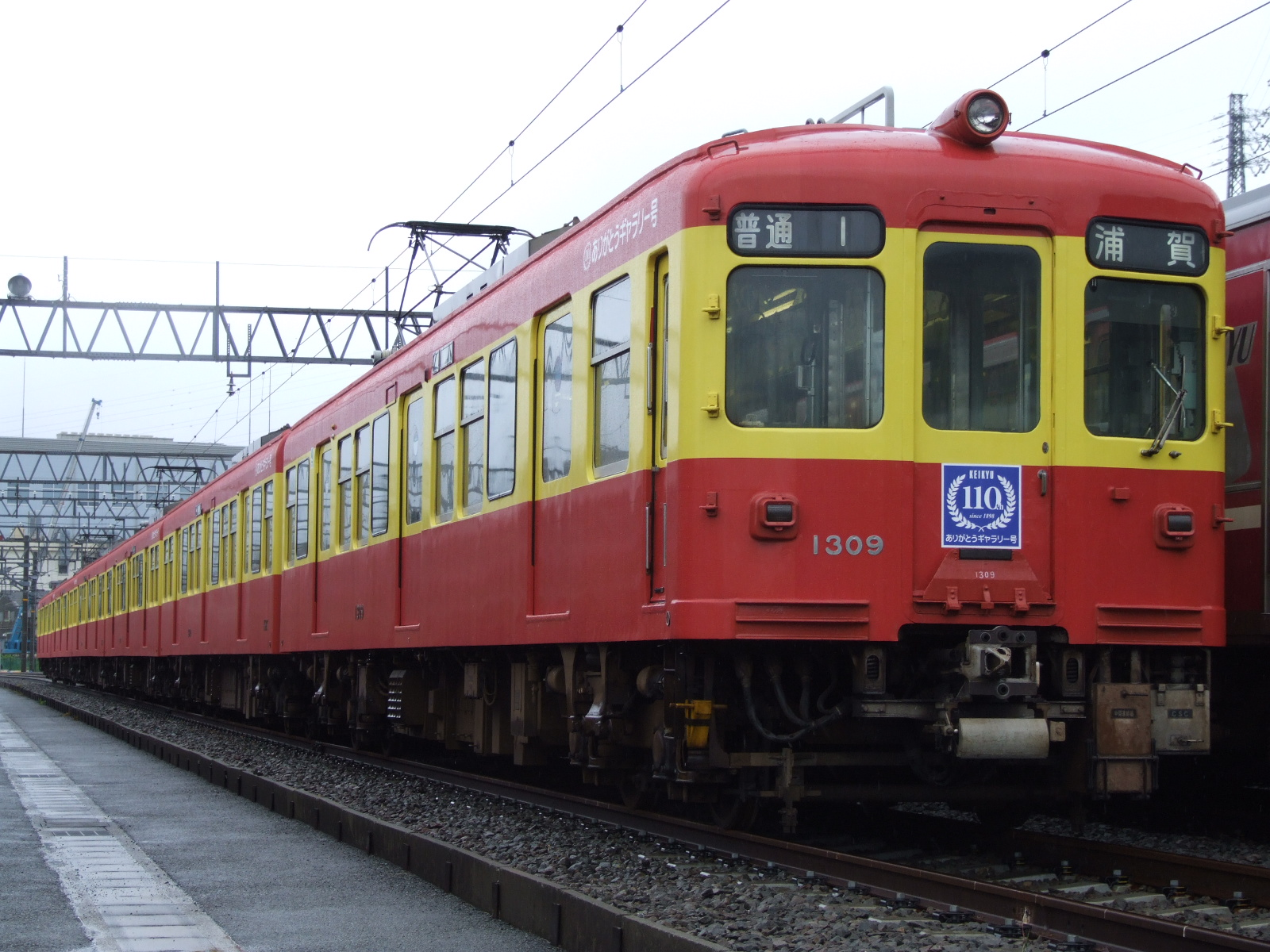
Set 1309 in special "Arigato gallery" livery in May 2008

A special farewell train ran on 27 June 2010, and the last 1000 series sets remained in operation until 28 June on the Daishi Line.

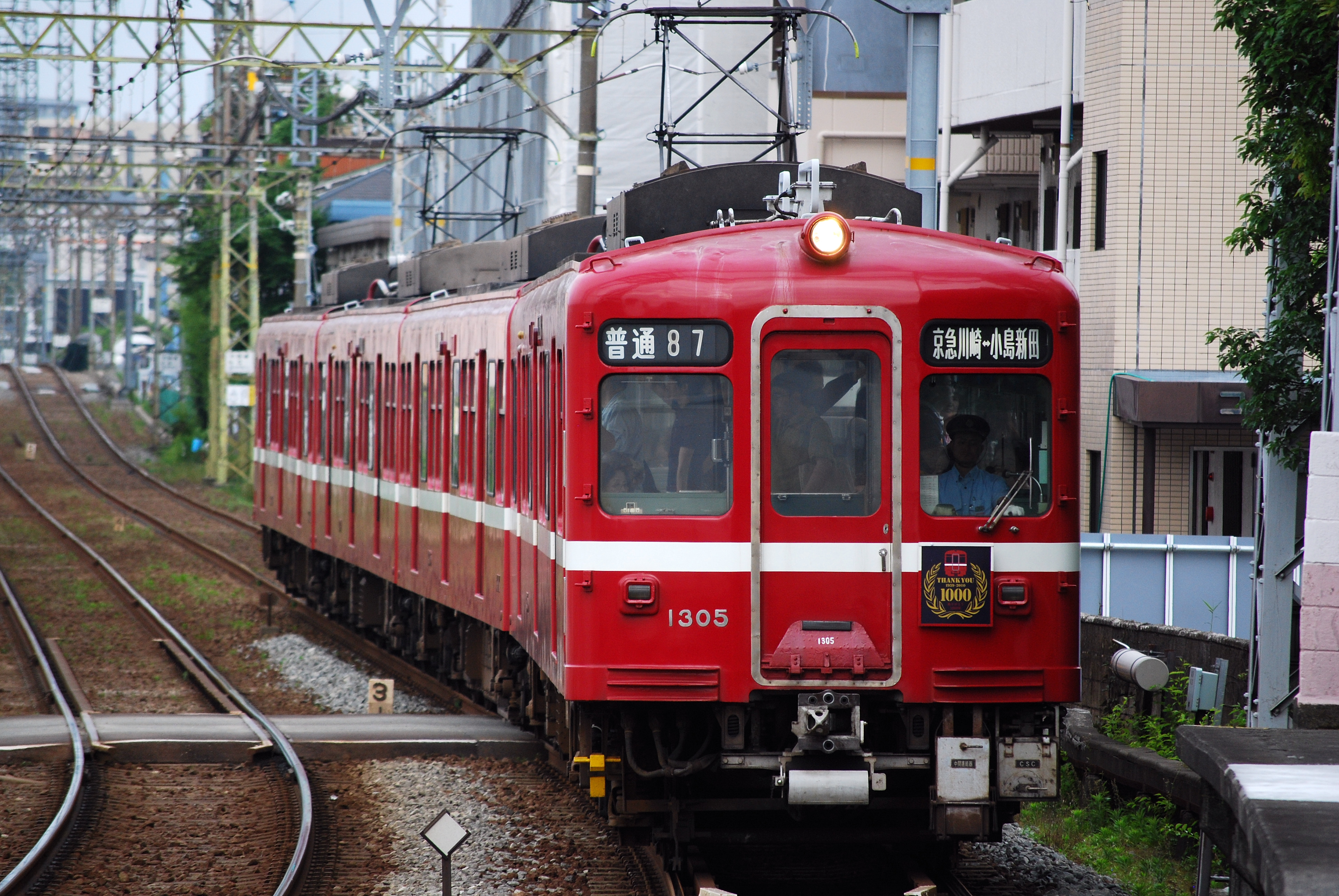
Keikyu 1000 series on the Daishi Line in June 2010, in the final weeks before withdrawal

== Resale ==
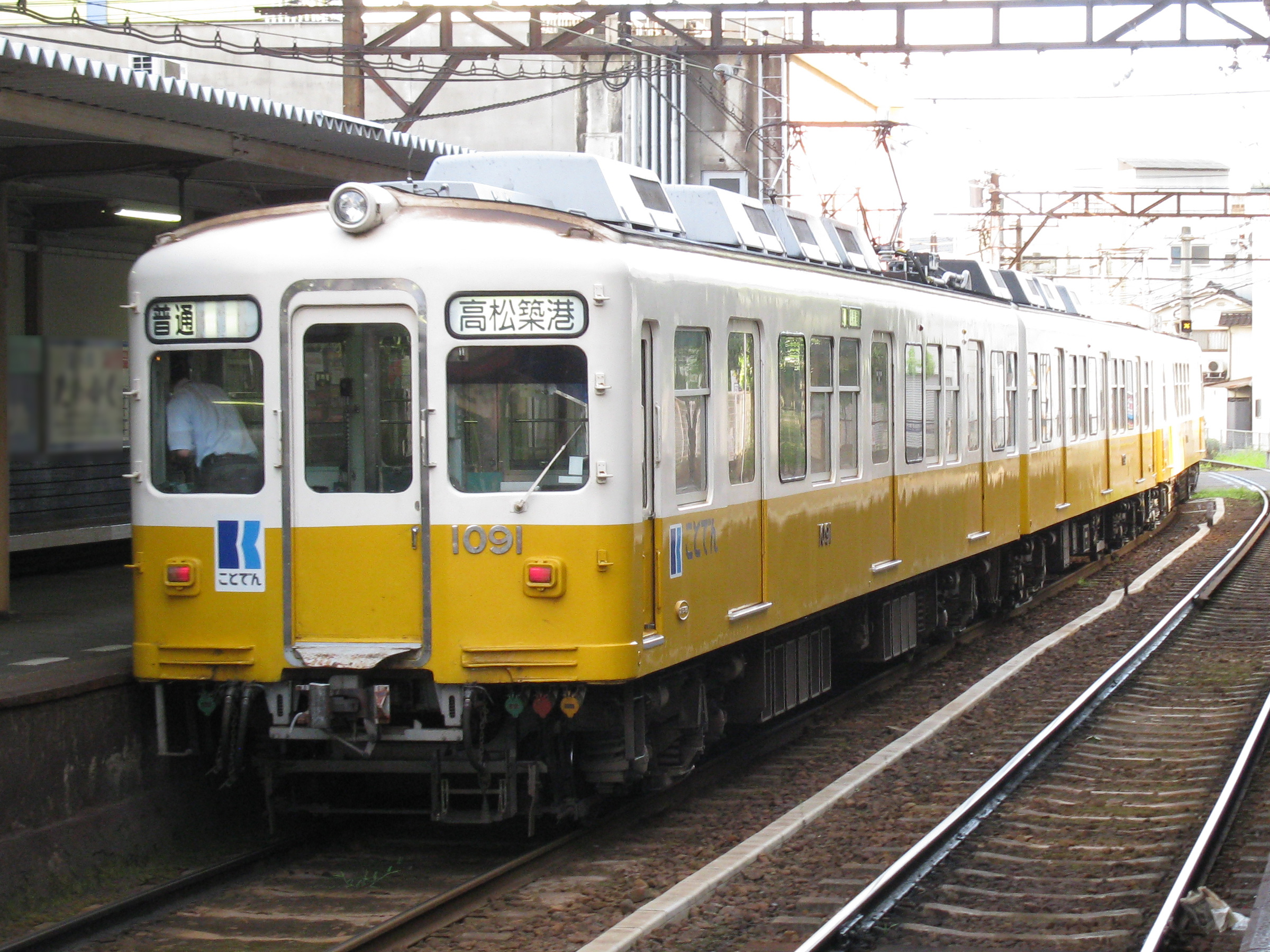
Kotoden 1080 series set 1091 in August 2010

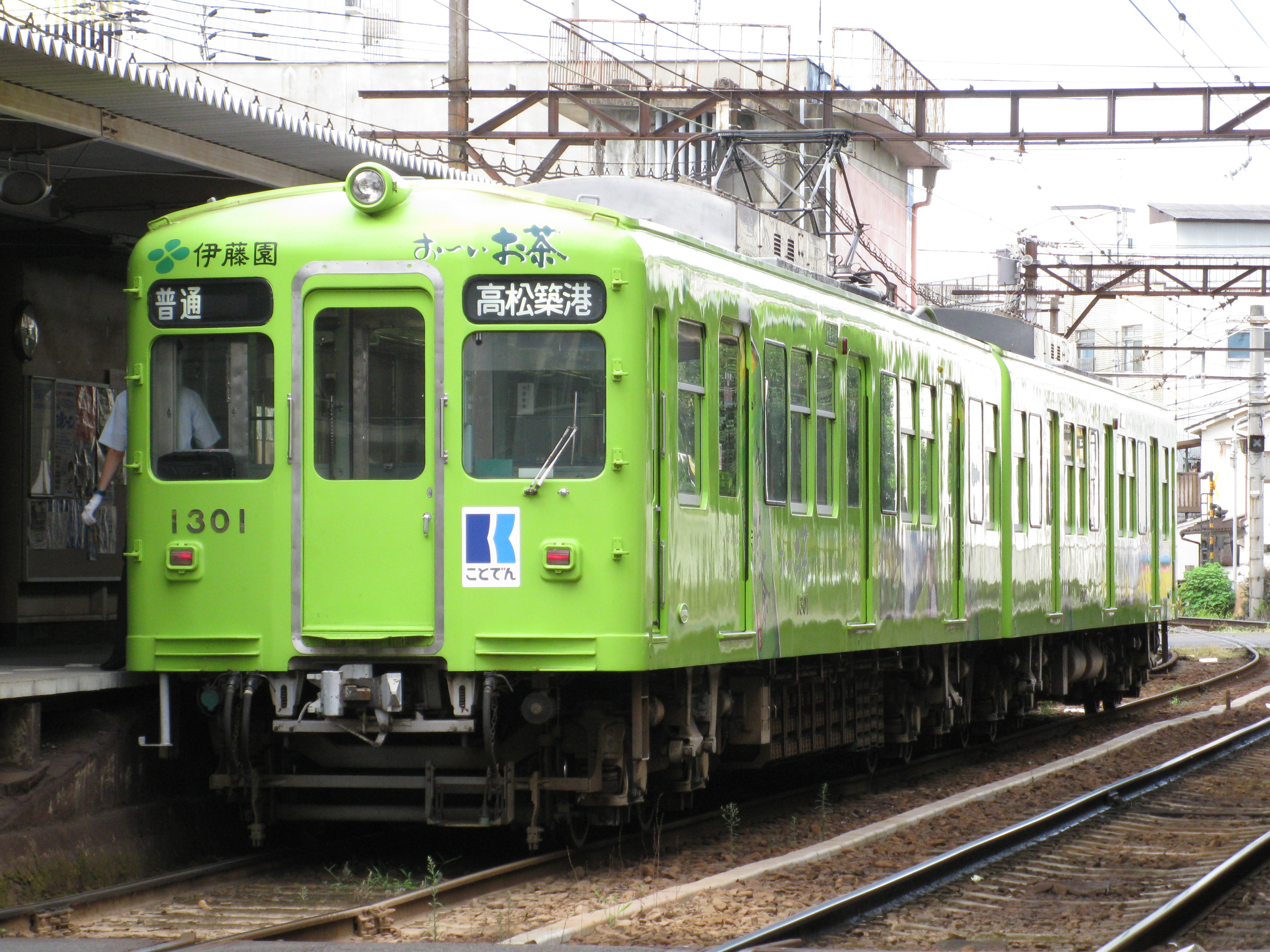
Kotoden 1300 series set 1301 in August 2010

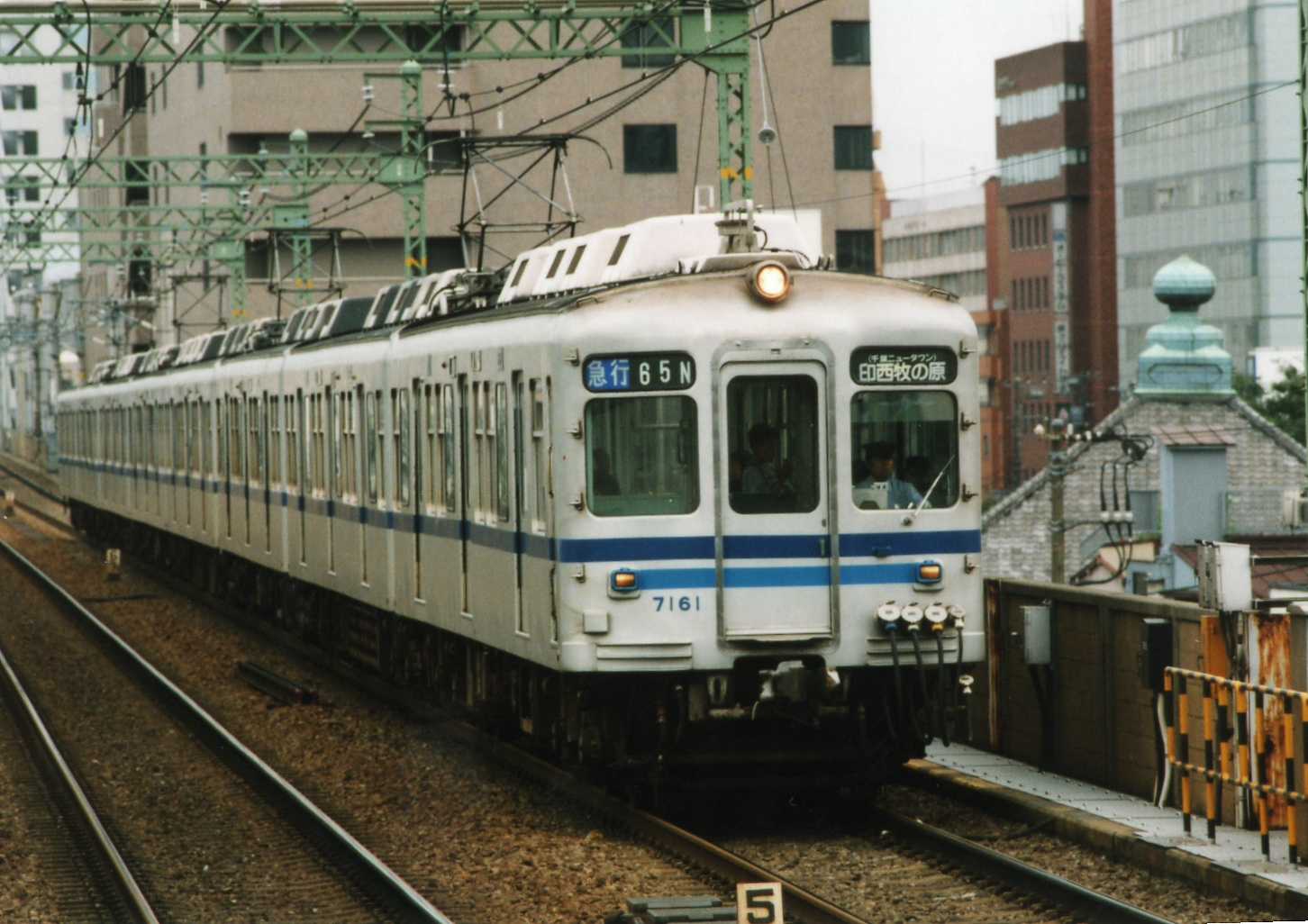
Hokuso 7150 series set 7161 in July 1995

A number of 1000 series cars were resold to the Takamatsu-Kotohira Electric Railroad ("Kotoden") in Shikoku, becoming the 1080 series and 1300 series. Other cars were also resold to the Hokuso Railway, becoming the Hokuso 7150 series.

The identities and histories of the 1000 cars sold to Kotoden are as shown below.

Keikyu No.	Type	Withdrawn	Resold to Kotoden	Kotoden No.	Remarks
1011	M1	14 August 1988	14 December 1988	1081	Cab donated from 1009
1012	M2c	14 August 1988	14 December 1988	1082	
1019	M1	31 March 1989	8 July 1989	1083	Cab donated from 1017
1020	M2c	31 March 1989	8 July 1989	1084	
1023	M1	21 August 1989	19 December 1989	1085	Cab donated from 1021
1024	M2c	21 August 1989	19 December 1989	1086	
1027	M1	1 December 1989	28 June 1990	1087	Cab donated from 1025
1028	M2c	1 December 1989	28 June 1990	1088	
1043	M1	25 March 1991	14 August 1991	1091	Cab donated from 1041
1044	M2c	25 March 1991	14 August 1991	1092	
1047	M1	20 August 1990	19 April 1991	1089	Cab donated from 1045
1048	M2c	20 August 1990	19 April 1991	1090	
1243	M1c	14 June 2010	31 August 2011	1307	
1250	M2c	14 June 2010	31 August 2011	1308	
1291	M1c	9 March 2007	28 June 2007	1303	
1298	M2c	9 March 2007	28 June 2007	1304	
1305	M1c	30 June 2010	31 August 2011	1305	
1308	M2c	30 June 2010	31 August 2011	1306	
1313	M1c	26 January 2007	27 June 2007	1301	
1316	M2c	26 January 2007	27 June 2007	1302	

== Preservation ==
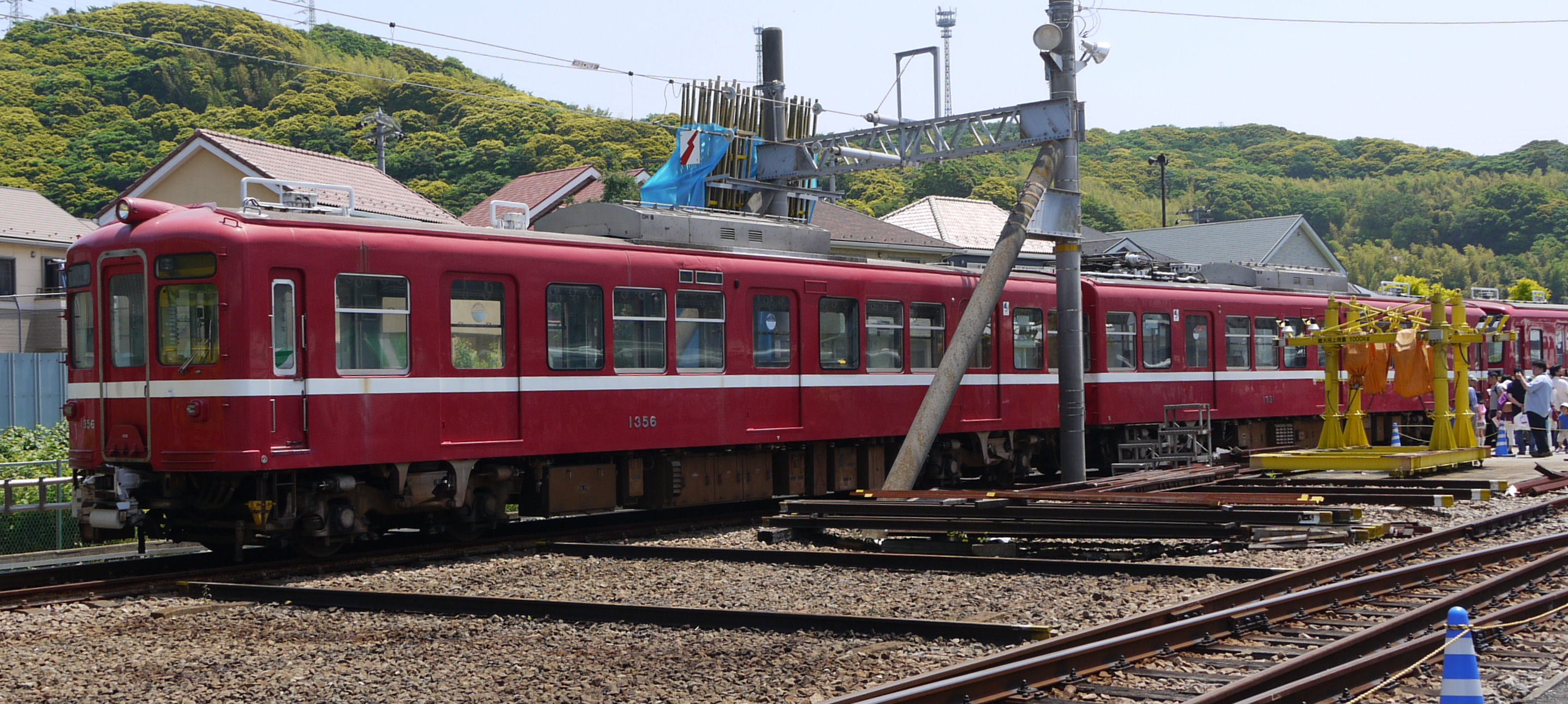
Preserved cars 1351 and 1356 in May 2012

Two 1000 series cars, 1351 and 1356, remain stored at Keikyu's Kurihama Works.
