= Hokusō Line =

Railway line in Chiba Prefecture, Japan

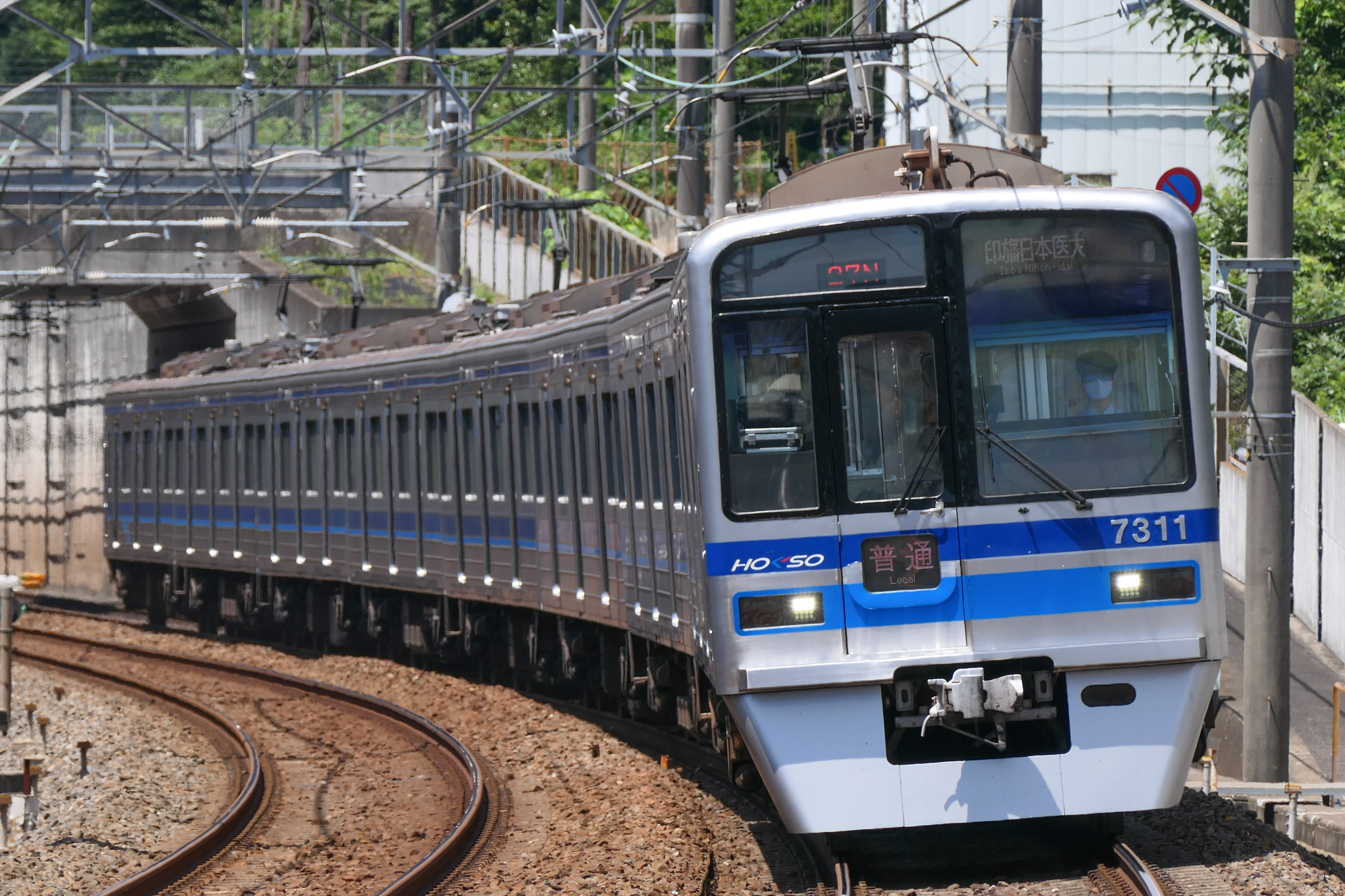
- A Hokusō Line 7300 series EMU in July 2021

Overview
- Native name: 北総線
- Owner: Hokusō Railway (between Keisei-Takasago and Komuro; Category 1); Chiba New Town Railway (between Komuro and Imba Nihon-idai; Category 2) (both controlled by Keisei Electric Railway)
- Locale: Tokyo and Chiba Prefecture
- Termini: Keisei-Takasago; Imba Nihon-idai
- Stations: 15

Service
- Type: Heavy rail
- Operator: Hokusō Railway
- Depot: Inba

History
- Opened: March 9, 1979; 47 years ago

Technical
- Line length: 32.3 km (20.1 mi)
- Character: Double track
- Track gauge: 1,435 mm (4 ft 8 1/2 in) standard gauge
- Electrification: Overhead line, 1,500 V DC
- Operating speed: 105 km/h (65 mph), upgrading to 130 km/h (81 mph) for Narita Rapid

The Hokusō Line (Japanese: 北総線, Hepburn: Hokusō-sen) is a Japanese commuter rail line the Greater Tokyo Area running between Keisei-Takasago Station in Katsushika, Tokyo and Imba Nihon-idai Station in Inzai, Chiba. It is operated by the Hokusō Railway (北総鉄道, Hokuso Tetsudō), a third-sector company jointly owned by Keisei Electric Railway (majority shareholder) along with Chiba Prefecture, Urban Renaissance Agency, and the cities of Matsudo and Ichikawa.

The line is part of the primary Keisei route between central Tokyo and Narita International Airport through the Narita Sky Access Line. The line's name is derived from its route through the former Shimōsa Province, also known as "Hokusō". All trains are equipped with an ATS Type 1 system.

== Operations ==
Most trains are all-station "Local" services, but some limited-stop "Rapid" express trains have operated in morning and evening hours.

Local (普通, Futsū) (L)
Stops at all stations. Provides through service to Keisei's Main Line and Oshiage Line, the Toei Subway Asakusa Line, and Keikyū's Main Line, Airport Line, and Kurihama Line.
Limited Express (特急, Tokkyū) (LE)
Runs only on weekdays.
Extra Liner (臨時ライナー, Rinji Liner) (EL)
Runs on weekday mornings only. This service is bound for Ueno Station. Requires an additional fare of ¥500 (¥250 for children).
Stop at five stations. Passengers may board at Imba Nihon-idai and Chiba New Town Chuo, and alight at Aoto, Nippori, and Keisei Ueno.
This service was introduced on October 1, 2020.

=== Discontinued service patterns ===
Express (急行, Kyūkō)
Ran only in the evening on weekdays, down from Keisei line. Discontinued as in 2022.

== Stations ==
Legend:

●	All trains stop
▲	Some trains stop
｜	All trains pass
△	Extra Liner can only be boarded
↑	Extra Liner passes in one direction

No.	Name	Local	Limited Express	Extra Liner	Access Express	Skyliner	Transfers	Location	
↑ Through service via the Keisei Main Line and Keisei Oshiage Line to/from ↑ Nishi-Magome via the Toei Asakusa Line; Yokohama via the Toei Asakusa Line and Keikyū Main Line, and Misakiguchi via the Keikyū Kurihama Line; Haneda Airport Terminal 1·2 and Terminal 3 via the Toei Asakusa Line, Keikyū Main Line, and Keikyū Airport Line
KS10	Keisei-Takasago 京成高砂	●	●	↑	●	|	Keisei Main Line (through service); Keisei Kanamachi Line; Keisei Narita Airport Line	Katsushika	Tokyo
HS01	Shin-Shibamata 新柴又	●	|	↑	|	|		Katsushika	Tokyo
HS02	Yagiri 矢切	●	|	↑	|	|		Matsudo	Chiba
HS03	Kita-Kokubun 北国分	●	|	↑	|	|		Ichikawa	Chiba
HS04	Akiyama 秋山	●	|	↑	|	|		Matsudo	Chiba
HS05	Higashi-Matsudo 東松戸	●	●	↑	●	|	Keisei Narita Airport Line; Musashino Line (JM13)	Matsudo	Chiba
HS06	Matsuhidai 松飛台	●	|	↑	|	|		Ichikawa	Chiba
HS07	Ōmachi 大町	●	|	↑	|	|		Ichikawa	Chiba
HS08	Shin-Kamagaya 新鎌ヶ谷	●	●	↑	●	▲	Keisei Matsudo Line (KS78); Keisei Narita Airport Line; Tobu Urban Park Line (TD-30)	Kamagaya	Chiba
HS09	Nishi-Shiroi 西白井	●	●	↑	|	|		Shiroi	Chiba
HS10	Shiroi 白井	●	●	↑	|	|		Shiroi	Chiba
HS11	Komuro 小室	●	●	↑	|	|		Funabashi	Chiba
HS12	Chiba New Town Chūō 千葉ニュータウン中央	●	●	△	●	|	Keisei Narita Airport Line	Inzai	Chiba
HS13	Inzai-Makinohara 印西牧の原	●	●	↑	|	|		Inzai	Chiba
HS14	Imba Nihon-idai 印旛日本医大	●	●	△	●	|		Inzai	Chiba
↓ Through service to/from Narita Airport Terminal 1 via the Narita Sky Access Line ↓

== Rolling stock ==
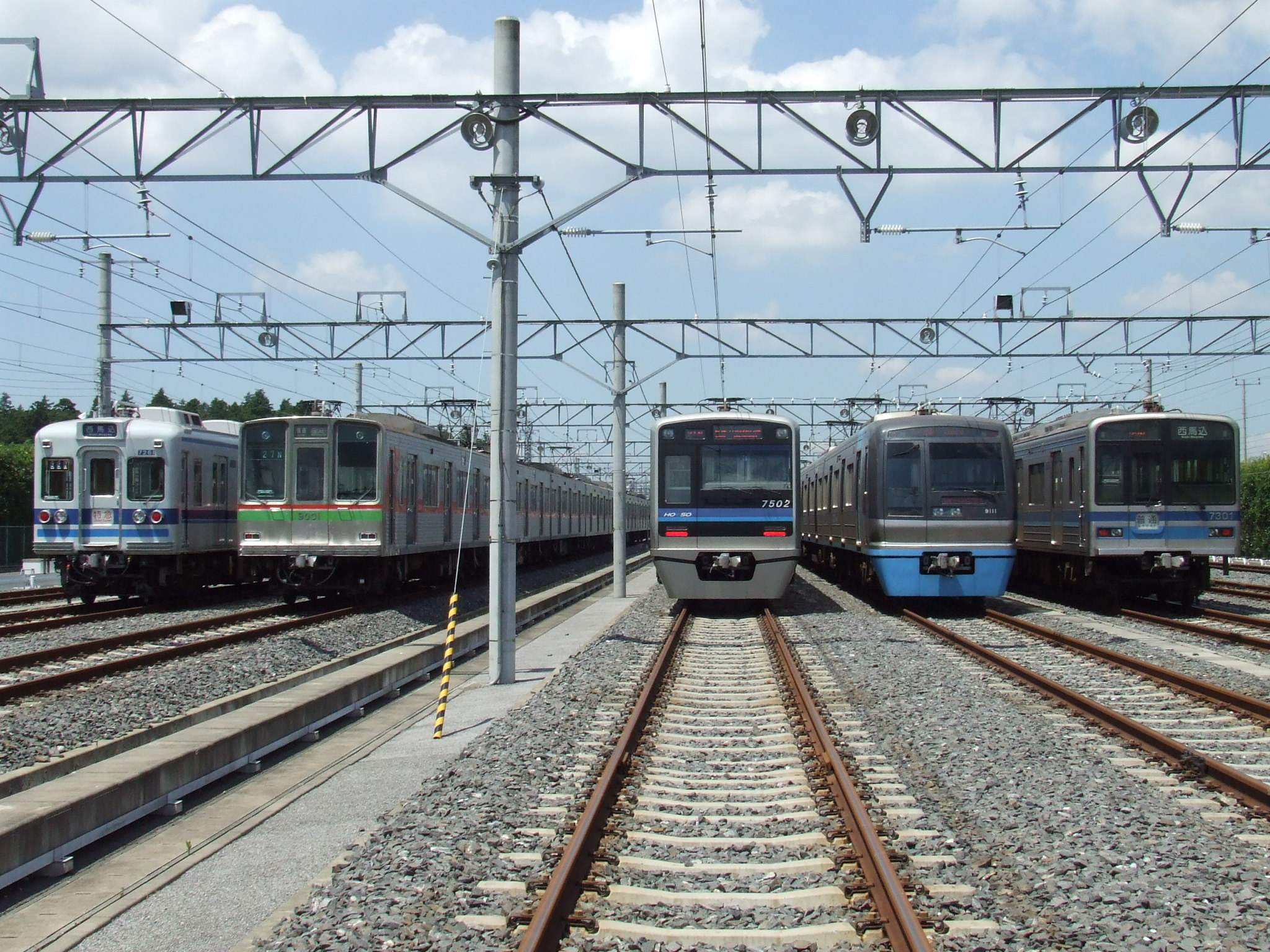
Lineup of Hokuso Line rolling stock in August 2007

=== Hokuso Railway ===
- Hokuso 7300 series (since 1991)
- Hokuso 7500 series (since 2006)
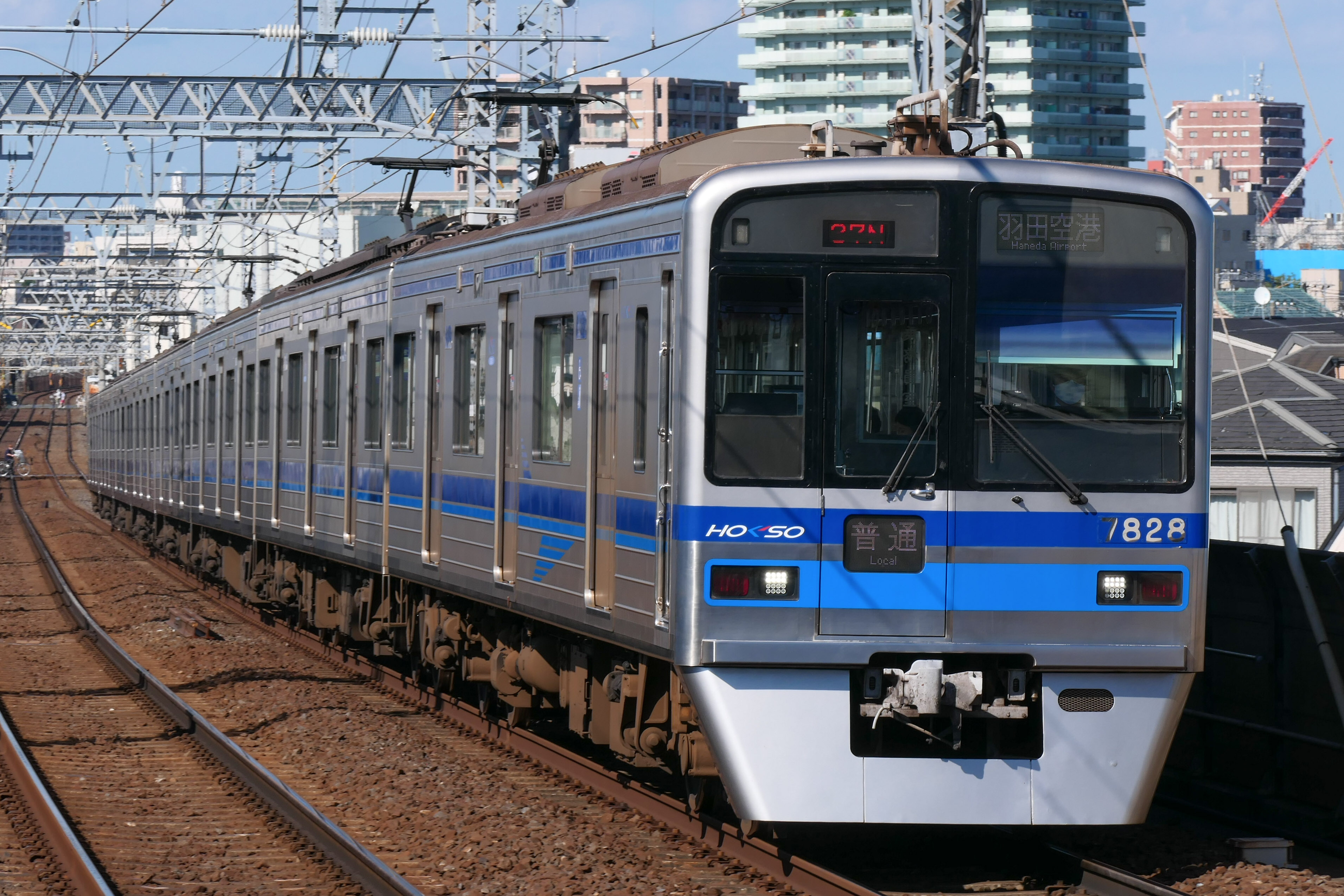
Hokuso 7300 series

=== Chiba New Town Railway ===
- Chiba New Town Railway 9100 series (since 1994, branded "C-Flyer")
- Chiba New Town Railway 9200 series (since March 2013)
- Chiba New Town Railway 9800 series (since 21 March 2017)
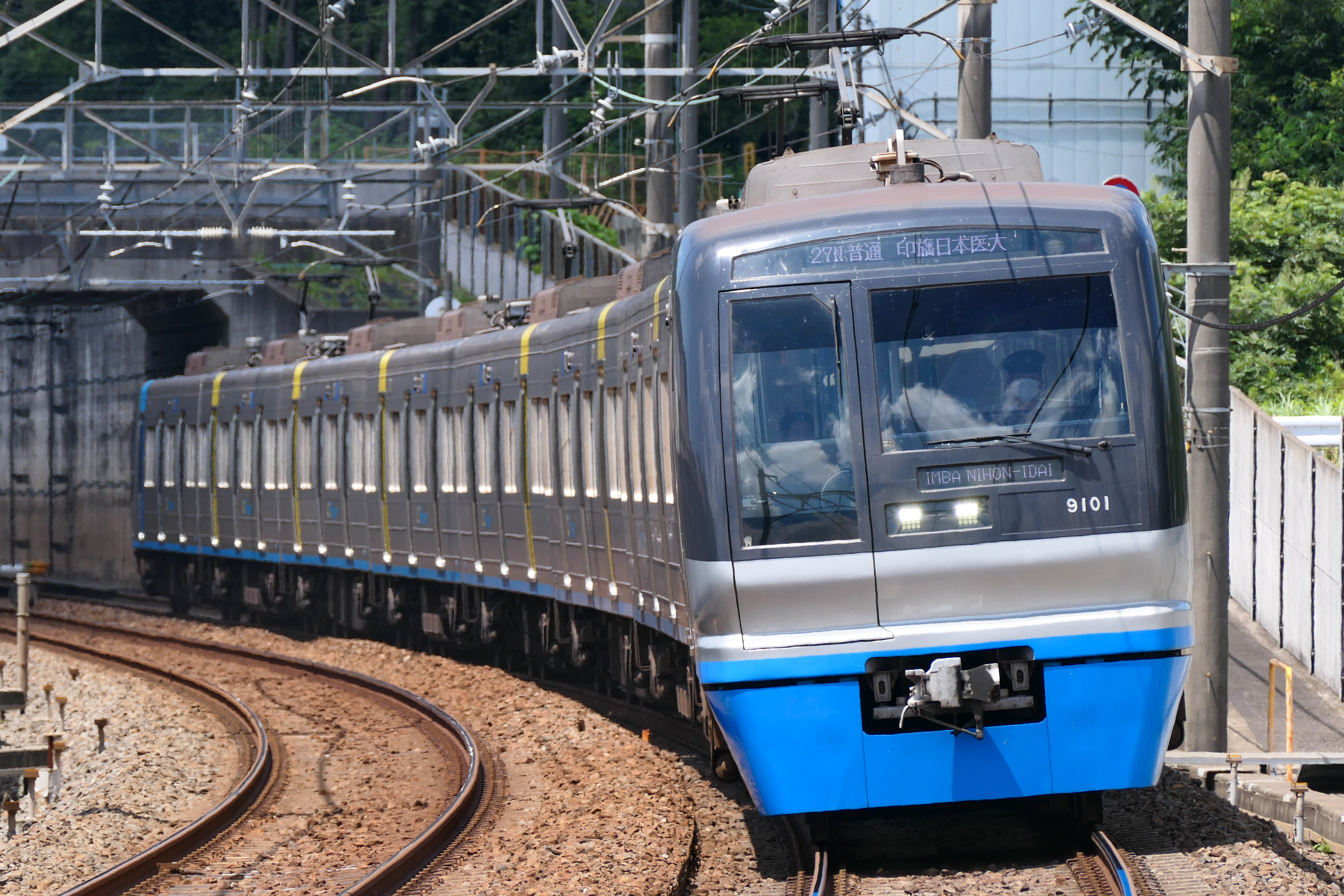
Chiba New Town Railway 9100 series

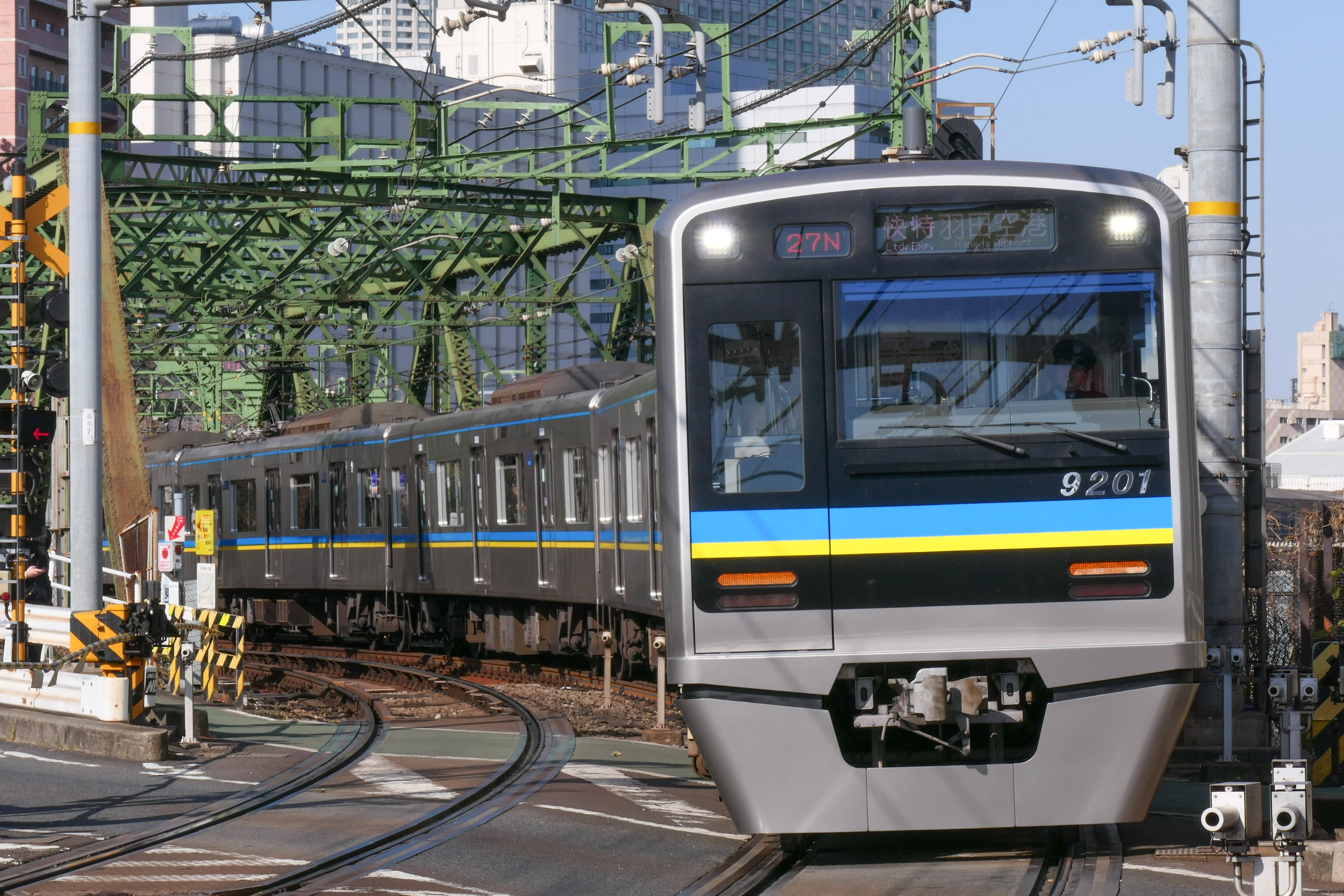
Chiba New Town Railway 9200 series

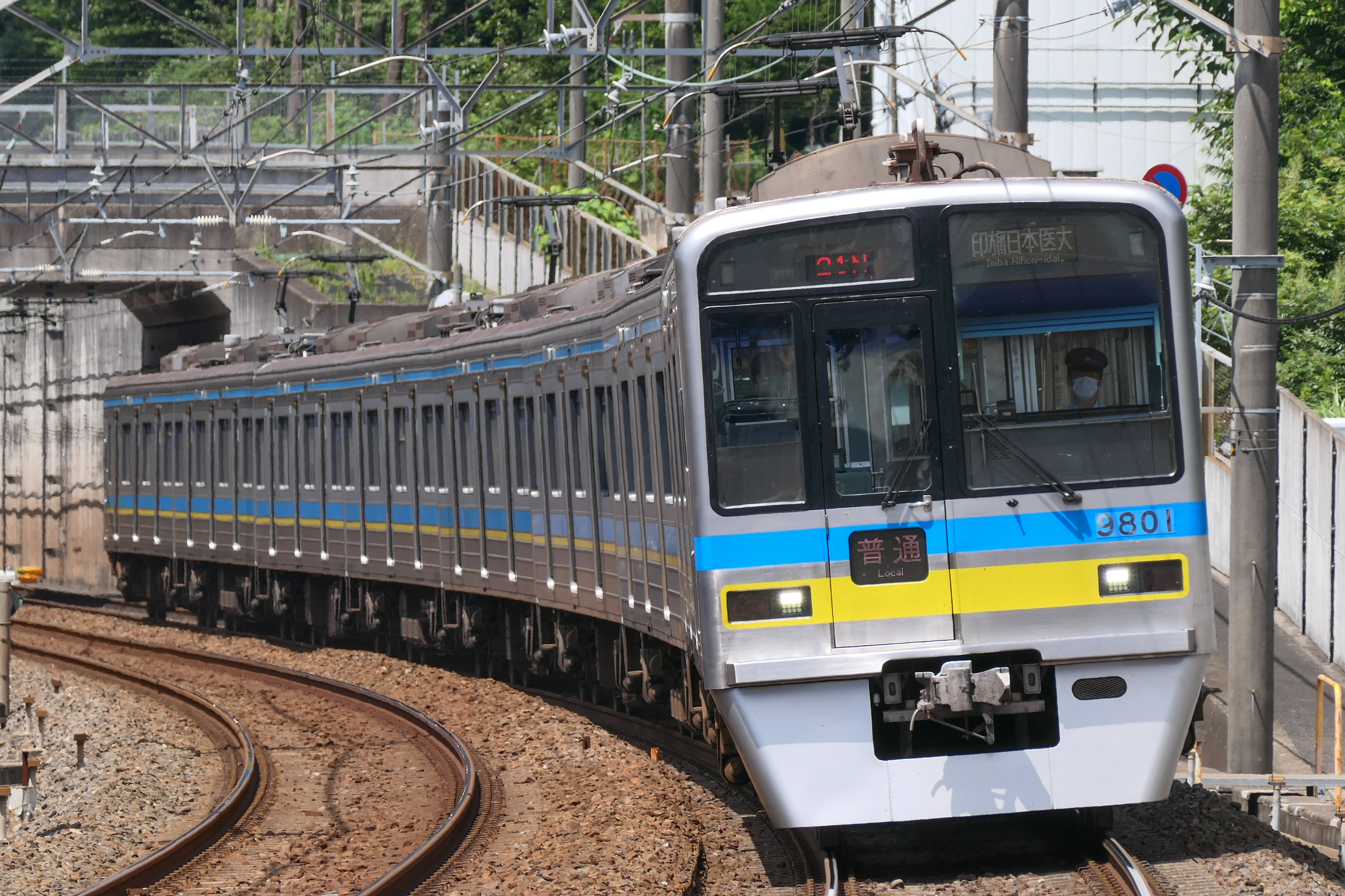
Chiba New Town Railway 9800 series

=== Keisei Electric Railway ===
- Keisei 3000 series (since 2003)
- Keisei 3050 series (since 2010)
- Keisei 3100 series (since 2019)
- Keisei 3400 series (since 1993)
- Keisei 3500 series (refurbished sets only)
- Keisei 3700 series (since 1991)
- Keisei AE series (since 2010)

=== Keikyu ===
- Keikyu 600 series (since 1994)
- Keikyu N1000 series (since 2002)
- Keikyu 1500 series (since 1985)

=== Toei Subway ===
- Toei 5500 series (since 2018, through service with Toei Asakusa Line)

=== Former rolling stock ===
==== Chiba New Town Railway ====
- Chiba New Town Railway 9000 series (from 1984 until 20 March 2017)

==== Hokuso Railway ====
- 7000 series (from 1979 until 2007)
- 7050 series (rebadged Keisei 3150 series cars leased from Keisei)
- 7150 series (from 1991 until 1998, converted from former Keikyu 1000 series EMUs)
- 7250 series (from 2003 until 2006, converted from former Keisei 3200 series EMUs)
- Hokuso 7260 series (from 2006 until March 2015, converted from Keisei 3300 series EMUs)
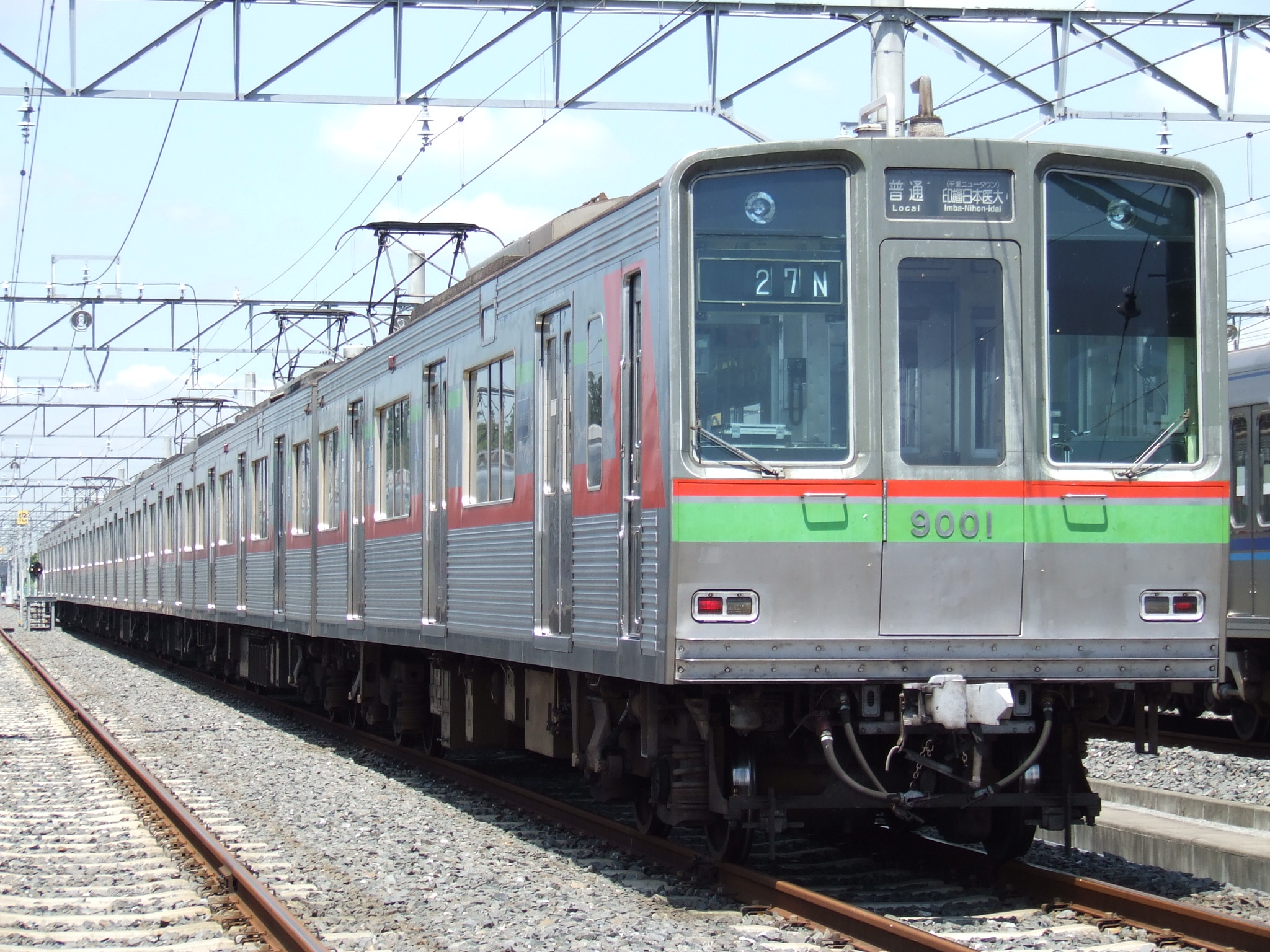
Chiba New Town Railway 9000 series in August 2007

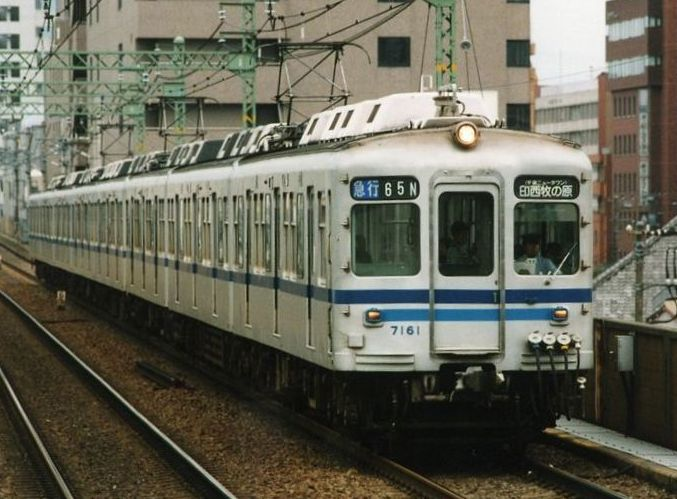
7150 series in July 1995

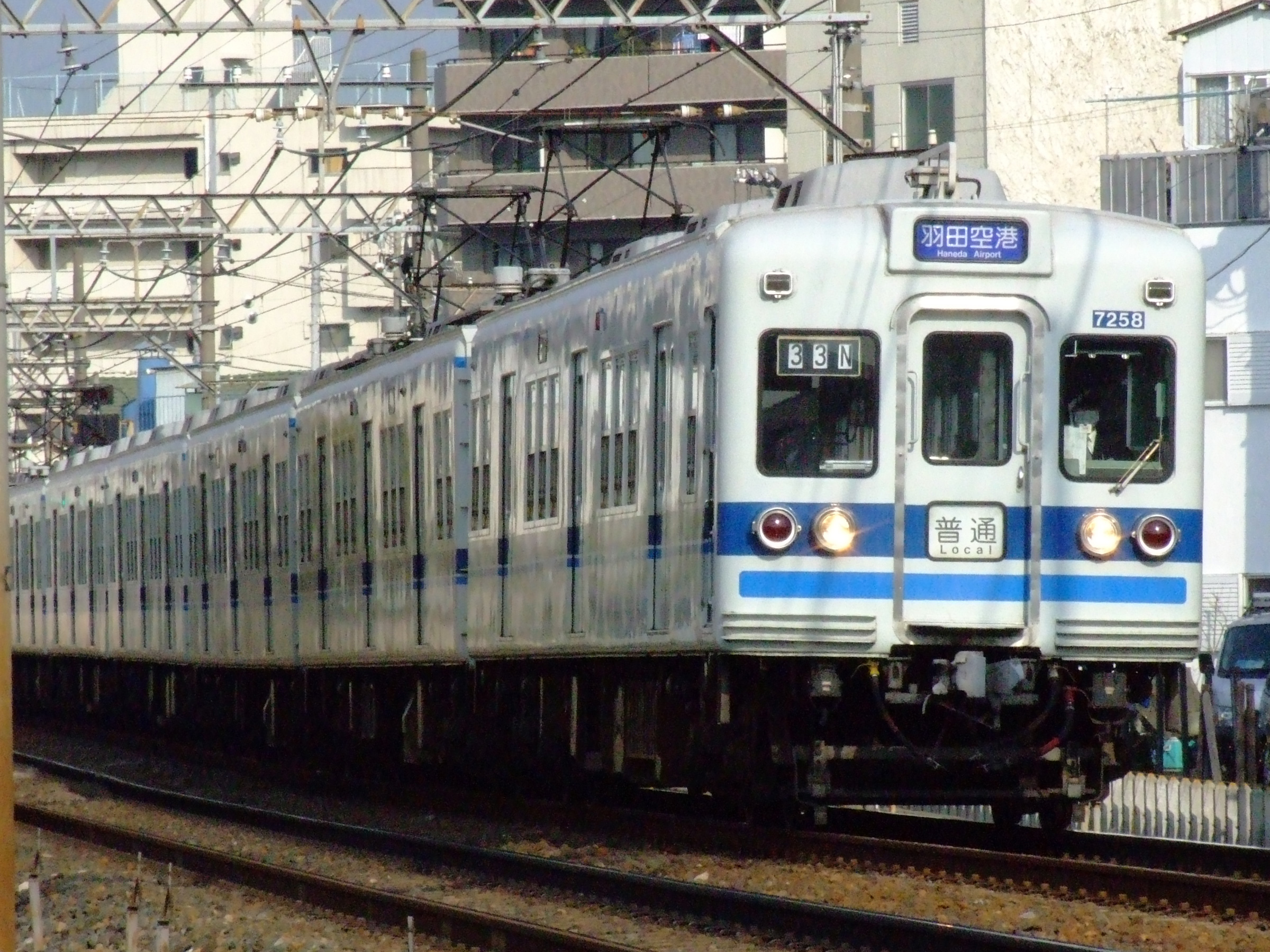
7250 series in February 2006

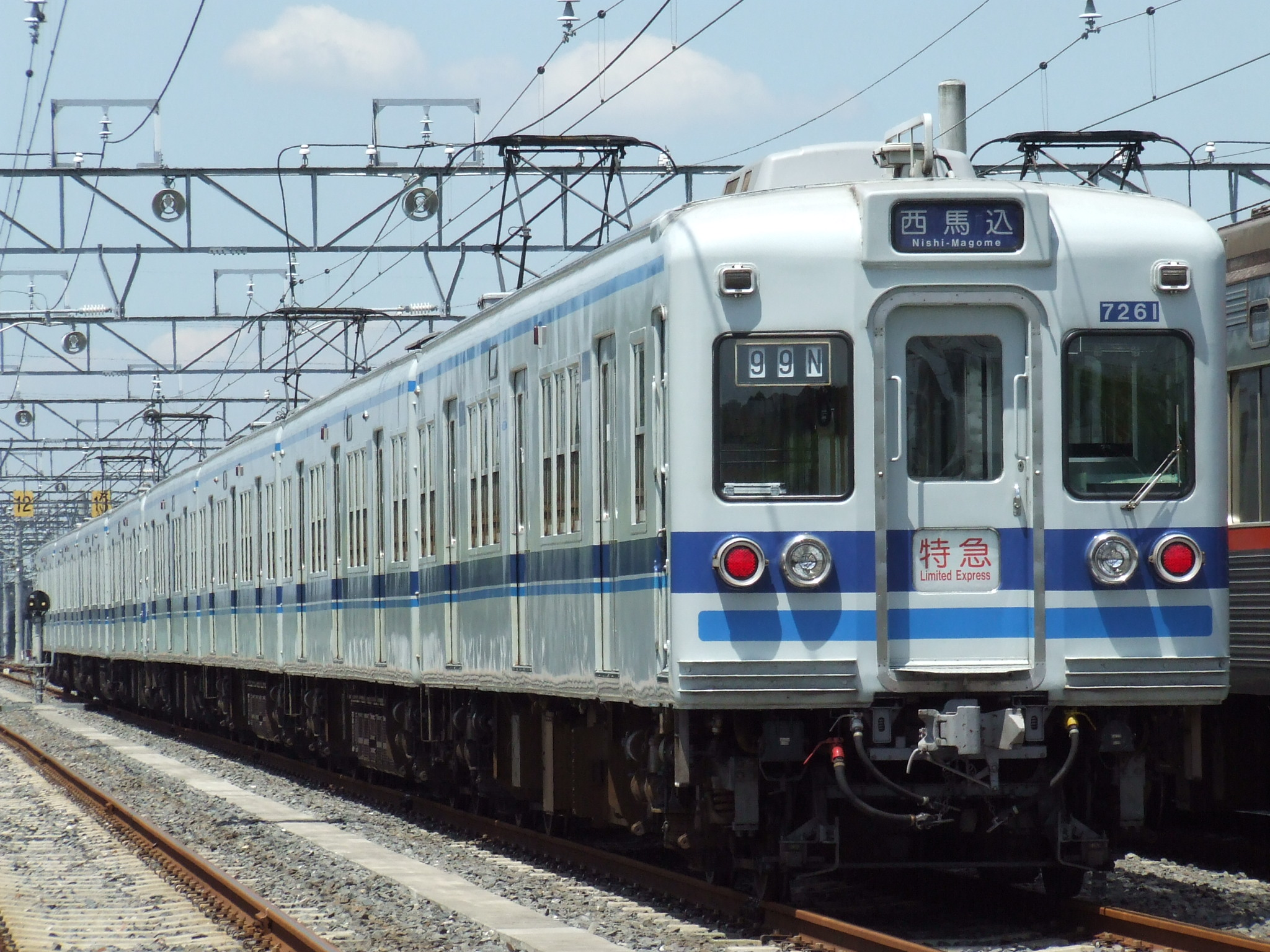
Hokuso 7260 series in August 2007

==== Shin-Keisei Electric Railway ====
- 800 series (also leased to Hokuso Railway)
- 8800 series
- 8900 series
- Keisei 200 series

==== Keisei Electric Railway ====
- 3050 series (original) (until 1995)
- 3100 series (until 1998)
- 3150 series
- 3200 series (until 2007)
- 3300 series (unrefurbished sets)
- 3500 series (unrefurbished sets)
- 3600 series

==== Toei Subway ====
- 5000 series
- 5200 series
- Toei 5300 series

==== Keikyu ====
- Keikyu 1000 series (until 2010)

== History ==
The first section of the line, from Komuro to Shin-Kamagaya, opened in March 1979, including a temporary connection to the Shin-Keisei Line at Kita-Hatsutomi. As other tracks were connected, it changed its name to "Hokusō Kōdan Line" in April 1987. Over 17 years later, the railway properties of the HDC corporation transferred to Chiba New Town Railway (千葉ニュータウン鉄道, Chiba Nyūtaun Tetsudō), on July 1, 2004, and the whole line was renamed to the Hokusō Line.

=== Western section ===
This section was planned as a railway access to Chiba New Town. Initially proposed by a committee of the then Ministry of Transport, the route was numbered "Line 1", as the northern extension of Tokyo Metropolitan Bureau of Transportation (Toei) Line 1 (present Asakusa Line) to Komuro area of Chiba New Town. In 1979 the first phase of this section between Kita-Hatsutomi and Komuro opened. The through-operation via Shin-Keisei Line to Matsudo began, on a temporary basis until the second phase of this section could connect the town directly to the Keisei and Asakusa Line network.

The second phase section to Keisei-Takasago on the Keisei Main Line opened in 1991, and through-operation began. In the following year, Shin-Keisei included Shin-Kamagaya Station as a transfer station, and abandoned the temporary route.

=== Eastern section ===
The section east of Komuro was initially the eastern part of a once-planned Chiba Prefectural Railway (千葉県営鉄道, Chiba Ken'ei Tetsudō) (II, apart from the first which opened the Tōbu Noda Line and the Kururi Line) as an extension of Line 10 (Shinjuku Line). The line was to be built from Moto-Yawata via Komuro to parallel to the line above, then to terminate at present Imba Nihon-idai. The first section between Komuro and Chiba New Town Chūō was opened in 1984, and the operations were commissioned to the present Hokusō Railway.

- March 9, 1979: Hokusō Line (first phase) of Hokusō Development Railway (北総開発鉄道, Hokusō Kaihatsu Tetsudō) Kita-Hatsutomi – Komuro. Through service via the Shin-Keisei Line to Matsudo on temporary basis.
- March 19, 1984: Chiba New Town Line (千葉ニュータウン線, Chiba Nyūtaun sen) of Housing and Urban Development Corporation (住宅・都市整備公団, Jūtaku Toshi Seibi Kōdan) (HUDC onwards) Komuro – Chiba New Town Chūō.
- April 1, 1987: Upon the commencement of the Railway Business Act (鉄道事業法, Tetsudō Jigyōhō), Act No. 92 of 1986) and the privatization of JR, on the Komuro – Chiba New Town Chūō section, Hokusō Development Railway became the Category 2 Railway Business operator, while HUDC became Category 3. Simultaneously, the entire stretch was renamed to Hokusō Kōdan Line (北総・公団線; lit. Hokusō and the Corporation Line).
- March 31, 1991: Hokusō Line (phase 2) Keisei-Takasago – Shin-Kamagaya opened. Through service by four parties (Hokusō, Keisei Electric Railway, Tokyo Metropolitan Bureau of Transportation (Toei), Keihin Electric Express Railway (Keikyū)) began.
- July 4, 1992: Shin-Keisei opened Shin-Kamagaya Station. Through service with Shin-Keisei terminated. The Kita-Hatsutomi – Shin-Kamagaya section was abandoned.
- April 1, 1995: Chiba New Town Chūō – Inzai-Makinohara, as Hokusō Category 2, HUDC Category 3.
- 1999: HUDC reorganized to the Urban Development Corporation (都市基盤整備公団, Toshi Kiban Seibi Kōdan) (HDC onwards), continued state of Category 3 of the line.
- July 22, 2000: Inzai-Makinohara – Imba Nihon-idai section, as Hokusō Category 2, HDC Category 3. Present stretch completed.
- July 1, 2004: Railway properties of HDC transferred to Chiba New Town Railway (千葉ニュータウン鉄道, Chiba Nyūtaun Tetsudō), and the whole line was renamed as the Hokusō Line.

=== Extension to Narita Airport ===
After the abandonment of the planned Narita Shinkansen, routes of rapid transit to Narita Airport had long been discussed. For a utilization of partially completed tracks of the Shinkansen, JR East and Keisei lines to Narita Airport were realized. A much faster line had long been needed, and for that purpose the first priority was the Keisei – Hokusō route. In 2001, a new Cat-3 entity, Narita Rapid Rail Access (成田高速鉄道アクセス, Narita Kōsoku Tetsudō Access) commenced building a new line connecting Imba Nihon-idai to the junction to Narita Airport Rapid Railway (成田空港高速鉄道, Narita Kūkō Kōsoku Tetsudō) which is a Cat-3 company of existing access railways, the tracks of the formerly planned Narita Shinkansen. The express trains are operated by Keisei as a Cat-2 operator with maximum speed at 160 km/h (99 mph), the fastest among Japanese private railways (which was formerly shared with Hokuetsu Express until the opening of the Hokuriku Shinkansen in 2015) which enables a 34-minute journey from Nippori to Narita Airport. The line opened in July 2010.

=== Local subsidies ===
Hokuso Railway fares are significantly higher than those of other private railways in the region. In 2013, a journey of 12.7 km (7.9 mi) on the Hokuso Line cost 540 yen, while a 23.8 km (14.8 mi) journey cost 720 yen. Equivalent journeys on the Keisei Main Line cost 250 yen and 360 yen respectively while equivalent journeys on JR East cost 210 yen and 380 yen respectively. The difference in fares is largely due to the debt burden remaining from the portion of the line built and owned by Hokuso Railway itself; this is also the case for the Tōyō Rapid Railway Line and the Saitama Rapid Railway Line, which are also known for having comparatively high fares.

In 2009, Chiba Prefecture and several municipalities along the line agreed with Hokuso Railway for an average fare reduction of 4.6% (25% for student commuter passes), in exchange for which they agreed to subsidize half of the estimated revenue loss of 600 million yen. The fare reduction was implemented in July 2010 at the time of the opening of the Narita Sky Access Line. In 2011 and 2012, the cities of Shiroi and Inzai elected new mayors on platforms of negotiating for further fare reductions and stopping public subsidies respectively; a third-party study commissioned by the two city governments concluded in August 2013 that the Hokusō Line would break even at more discounted fare levels without local subsidies. Hokuso, on the other hand, has argued that increased consumption tax rates and capital expenditures related to upgrading the Pasmo system will force them to raise fares in 2015. Additional fare reduction measures were implemented on 1 October 2022 which brought down regular fares by around 10% along with commuter passes being discounted by an additional 65%.
