= Chiba New Town Chūō Station =

Railway station in Inzai, Chiba, Japan

HS12 Chiba New Town Chūō Station 千葉ニュータウン中央駅
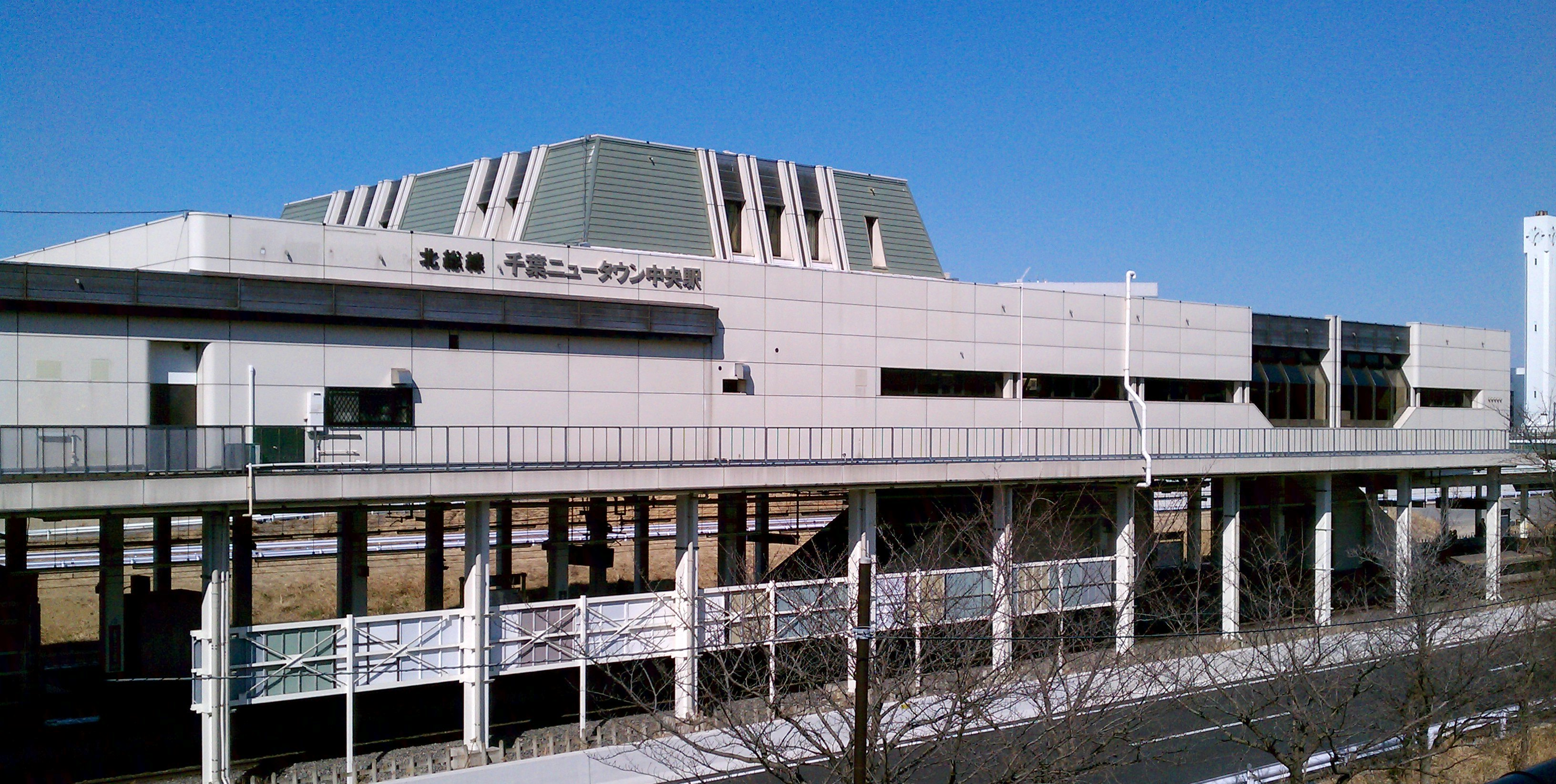
- Chiba New Town Chūō Station in February 2013

General information
- Location: 1-2191 Hara, Inzai-shi, Chiba-ken 271-0096; Japan
- Coordinates: 35.8001351°N 140.1162070°E
- Owner: Chiba New Town Railway
- Operator: Hokuso Railway; Keisei Electric Railway
- Lines: Hokuso Line; Narita Sky Access Line
- Platforms: 1 island platform
- Tracks: 2

Other information
- Station code: HS12
- Website: Official website

History
- Opened: 19 March 1984

Passengers
- FY2018: 30,028

Services
Preceding station	Keisei	Following station
Shin-Kamagaya HS08 towards Keisei-Takasago	Narita Sky Access Line Access Express	Imba Nihon-Idai HS14 towards Narita Airport Terminal 1
Preceding station	Hokusō Railway	Following station
Komuro HS11 towards Keisei Takasago	Hokusō Line Limited Express Local	Inzai-Makinohara HS13 towards Imba Nihon-idai
Location
- Location within Chiba Prefecture Location within Japan

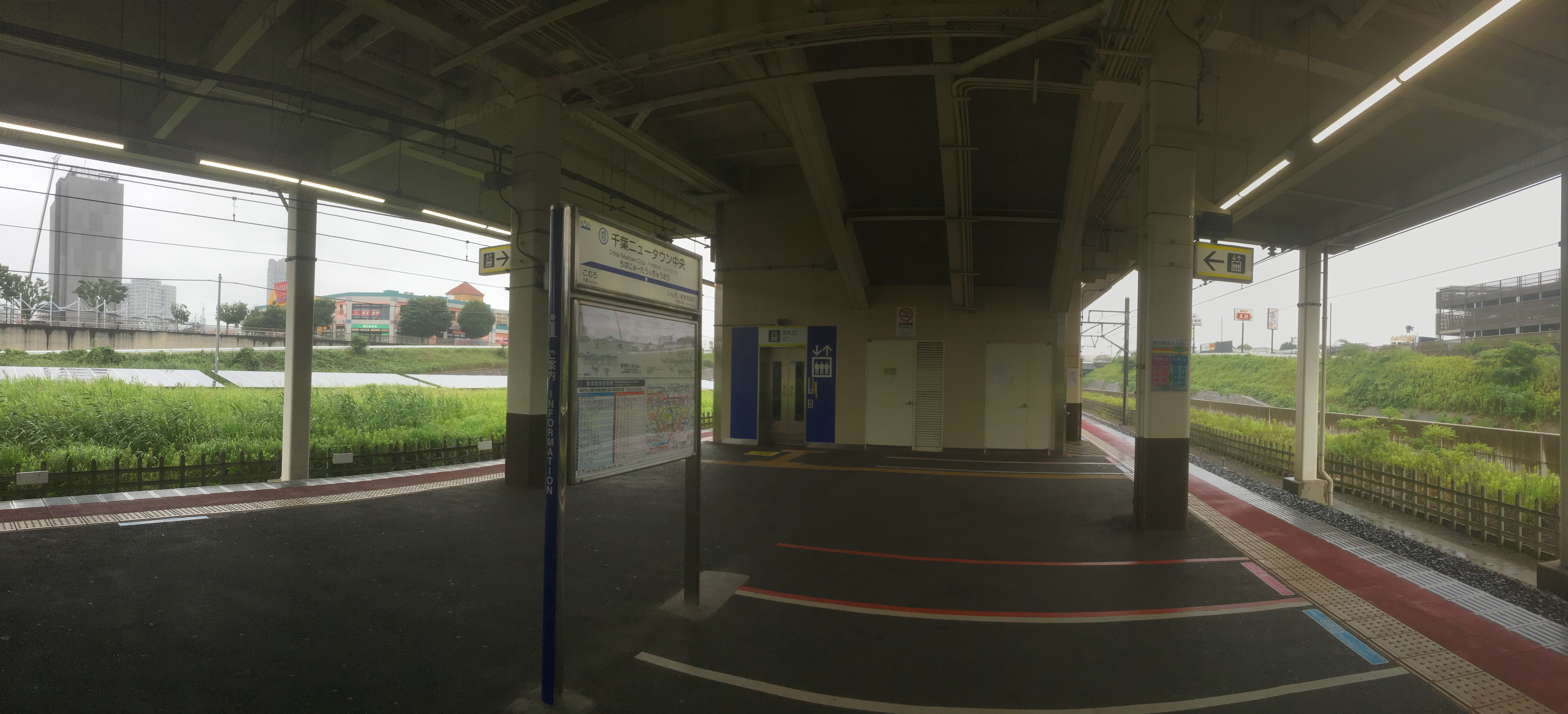
Station platforms, 2019

Chiba New Town Chūō Station (千葉ニュータウン中央駅, Chiba Nyūtaun Chūō-eki) is a junction passenger railway station in located in the city of Inzai, Chiba, Japan, operated jointly by the third-sector railway operator Hokusō Railway and the private railway company Keisei Electric Railway.

== Lines ==
Chiba New Town Chūō Station is served by the Hokusō Line and is located 23.8 kilometers from the starting point of the line at Keisei-Takasago. It is also served by the Narita Sky Access connecting downtown Tokyo with Narita Airport, which uses the same tracks as the Hokusō Line.

== Station layout ==
This station consists of one island platform serving two tracks, with an elevated station building located above the tracks and platforms.

=== Platforms ===
1	■ Hokusō Line	for Keisei-Takasago, Oshiage, and Haneda Airport
	■ Narita Sky Access	for Keisei-Takasago, Oshiage, and Haneda Airport
2	■ Hokusō Line	for Imba Nihon-idai
	■ Narita Sky Access	for Narita Airport

== History ==
Chiba New Town Chūō Station was opened on 19 March 1984. On 17 July 2010 a station numbering system was introduced to the Hokusō Line, with the station designated HS12.

== Passenger statistics ==
In fiscal 2018, the station was used by an average of 30,028 passengers daily.

== Surrounding area ==
- Inzai Post Office
- Tokyo Christian University
- National Route 464

== See also ==
- List of railway stations in Japan
