= Imba Nihon-idai Station =

Railway station in Inzai, Chiba Prefecture, Japan

HS14 Imba-Nihon-Idai Station 印旛日本医大駅
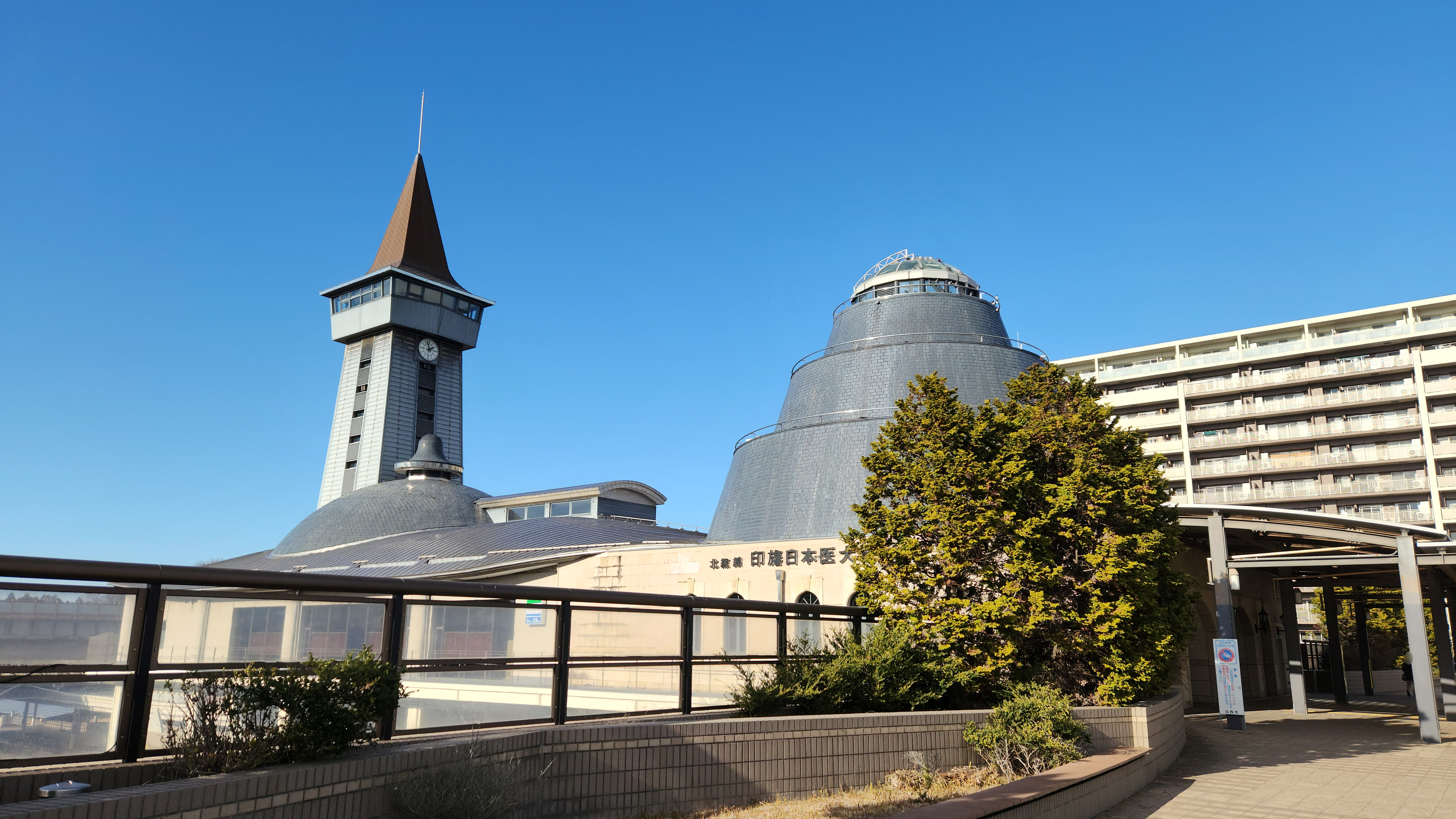
- Imba-Nihon-Idai Station in January 2025

General information
- Location: 1-1 Wakahagi, Inzai-shi, Chiba-ken 270-1609; Japan
- Coordinates: 35.7875°N 140.2032°E
- Operator: Hokuso Railway; Keisei Electric Railway
- Lines: Hokusō Line; Narita Sky Access Line
- Platforms: 1 island platform

Other information
- Station code: HS14
- Website: Official website

History
- Opened: 22 July 2000

Passengers
- FY2018: 6,021

Services
Preceding station	Keisei	Following station
Chiba New Town Chūō HS12 towards Keisei-Takasago	Narita Sky Access Line Access Express	Narita Yukawa KS43 towards Narita Airport Terminal 1
Preceding station	Hokusō Railway	Following station
Inzai-Makinohara HS13 towards Keisei Takasago	Hokusō Line Limited Express Local	Terminus
Location
- Location within Chiba Prefecture Location within Japan

Imba-Nihon-Idai Station (印旛日本医大駅, Inba-Nihon-Idai-eki) is a junction passenger railway station located in the city of Inzai, Chiba, Japan, operated jointly by the third-sector railway operator Hokusō Railway and the private railway company Keisei Electric Railway.

== Lines ==
Imba-Nihon-Idai Station is a terminus of the Hokusō Line and is located 32.3 kilometers from the opposing terminal of the line at Keisei-Takasago. It is also served by the Narita Sky Access connecting downtown Tokyo with Narita Airport, which uses the same tracks as the Hokusō Line.

== Station layout ==
This station consists of one island platform serving two tracks, with an elevated station building located above the tracks and platforms.

=== Platforms ===
1	Hokusō Line	for Higashi-Matsudo, Shin-Kamagaya, Keisei-Takasago, Oshiage, Shinagawa, and Haneda Airport
1	Narita Sky Access Line	for Higashi-Matsudo, Shin-Kamagaya, Keisei-Takasago, Keisei Ueno, Oshiage, Shinagawa and Haneda Airport
2	Narita Sky Access Line	for Narita Airport

== History ==
Imba-Nihon-Idai Station was opened on 22 July 2000. On 17 July 2010 a station numbering system was introduced to the Hokusō Line, with the station designated HS14.

== Passenger statistics ==
In fiscal 2018, the station was used by an average of 6,021 passengers daily.

== Surrounding area ==
- Nippon Medical School, Chiba Hokusou Hospital
- Juntendo University – Sakura campus
- National Route 464
- Lake Inba

== See also ==
- List of railway stations in Japan
