= Japan National Route 464 =

National highway in Japan

National Route 464
- 国道464号
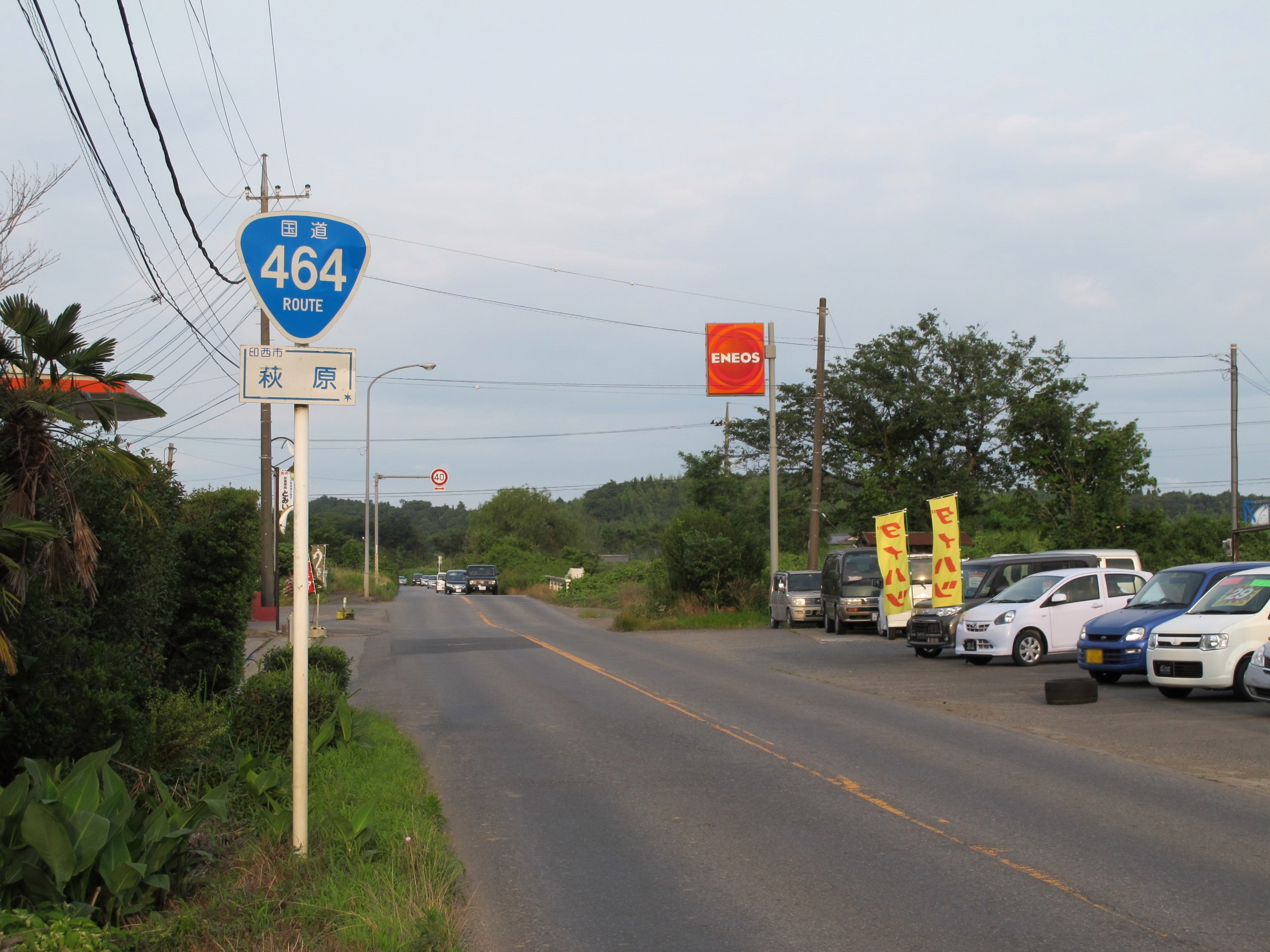

Route information
- Length: 46.9 km (29.1 mi)
- Existed: 1 April 1993–present

Major junctions
- West end: National Route 6 in Matsudo
- National Route 16
- East end: National Route 51 in Narita, Chiba

Location
- Country: Japan

Highway system
- National highways of Japan; Expressways of Japan
← National Route 463	→ National Route 465

National Route 464 is a national highway of Japan connecting Matsudo and Narita, Chiba in Japan, with a total length of 46.9 km (29.14 mi).
