= Honjo-azumabashi Station =

Metro station in Tokyo, Japan

Coordinates: 35°42′30.96″N 139°48′16.75″E

Honjo-azumabashi Station 本所吾妻橋駅

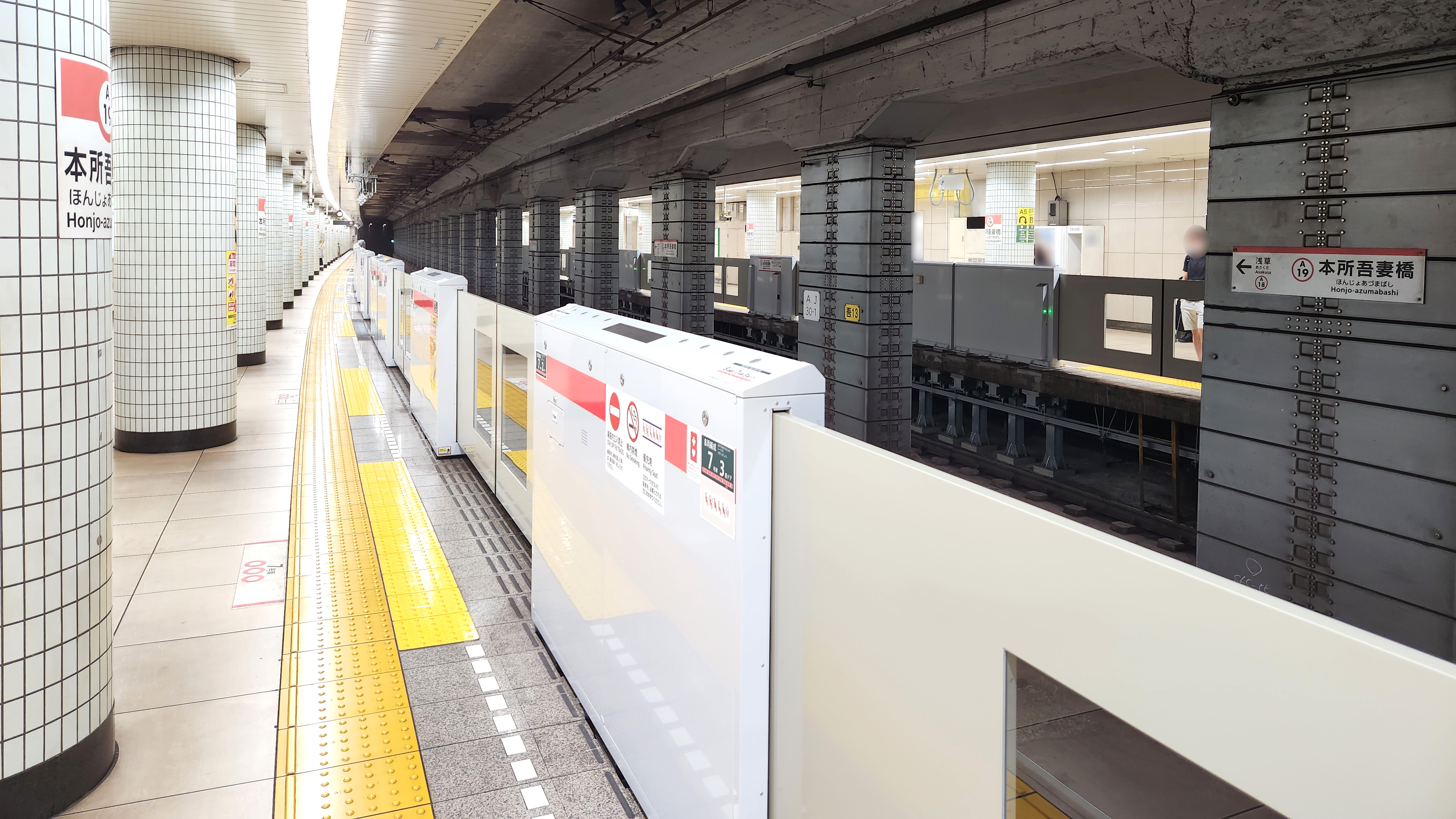
- Platform level of Honjo-azumabashi Station

General information
- Location: 3 Azumabashi, Sumida City, Tokyo; Japan
- Operator: Toei Subway
- Line: Asakusa Line
- Platforms: 2 side platforms
- Tracks: 2

Construction
- Structure type: Underground

Other information
- Station code: A-19

History
- Opened: 4 December 1960; 65 years ago

Services
Preceding station	Toei Subway	Following station
Asakusa towards Nishi-magome	Asakusa Line	Oshiage Terminus
Location
- Location within Special wards of Tokyo Location within Tokyo Bay and Bōsō Peninsula Location within Tokyo Location within Japan

Honjo-azumabashi Station (本所吾妻橋駅, Honjo-azumabashi-eki) is a subway station on the Toei Asakusa Line, operated by the Toei. It is located in Sumida, Tokyo, Japan. Its number is A-19.

== Station layout ==
Honjo-azumabashi Station has two side platforms serving two tracks.

=== Platforms ===
1	Asakusa Line	for Nihombashi, Sengakuji, and Nishi-magome; Keikyū Main Line for Shinagawa, Haneda Airport (International Terminal and Domestic Terminal), and Misakiguchi
2	Asakusa Line	for Oshiage; Keisei Main Line for Keisei Funabashi, Keisei Narita, and Narita Airport (Terminal 2·3 and Terminal 1); Narita Sky Access Line for Narita Airport; Hokusō Line for Imba Nihon-idai; Shibayama Railway Line for Shibayama-Chiyoda

== History ==
Honjo-azumabashi Station opened on December 4, 1960, as a station on Toei Line 1. In 1978, the line was given its present name.

== Surrounding area ==
The station serves the Azumabashi bridge neighborhood. Nearby are the local police station, the Sumida Ward office (city hall), and the headquarters of Asahi Breweries.
