= Toei Asakusa Line =

Subway line in Tokyo, Japan

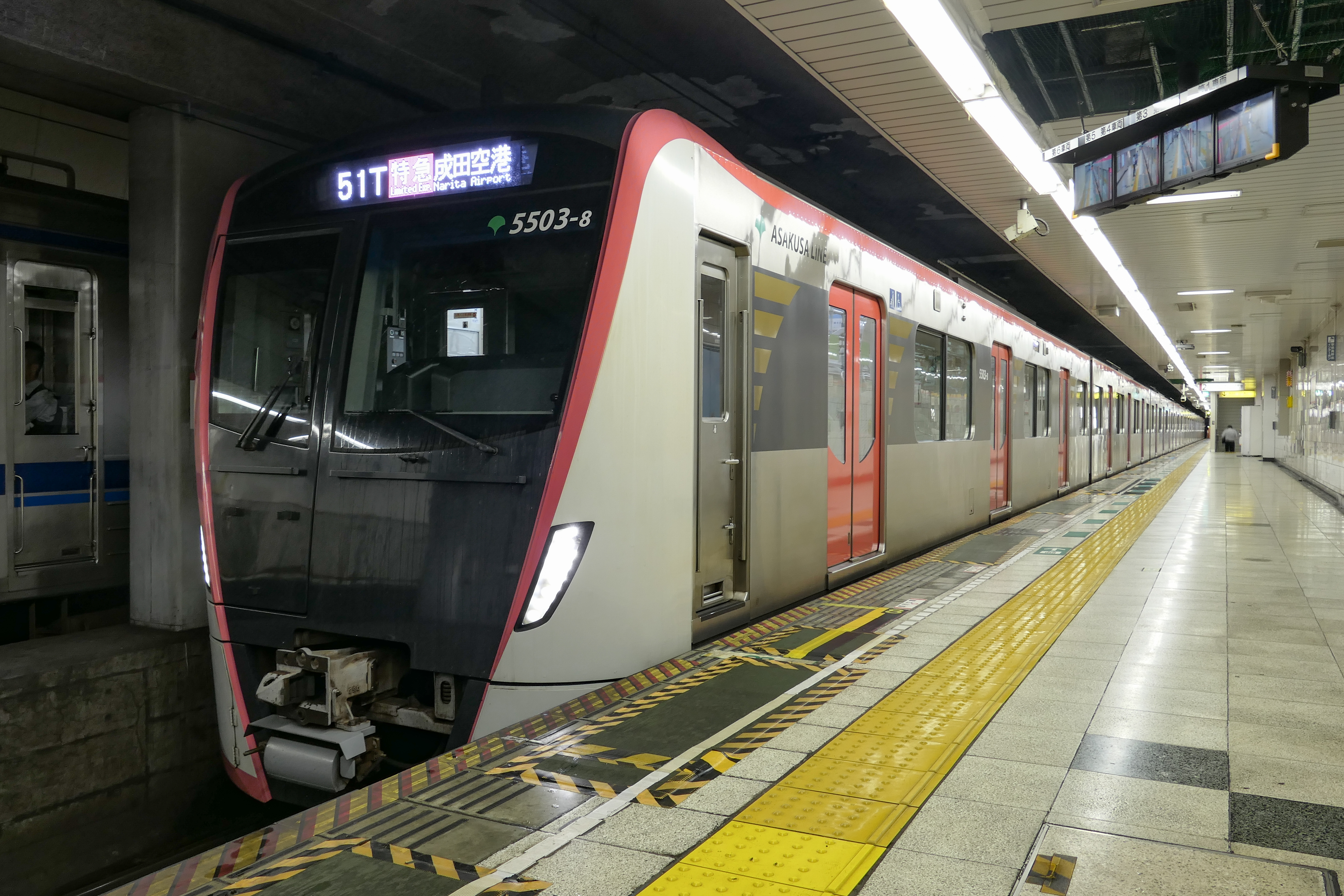
- A Toei Asakusa Line 5500 series train

Overview
- Other name: Line 1
- Native name: 都営浅草線
- Status: In service
- Owner: Tokyo Metropolitan Bureau of Transportation
- Line number: A
- Locale: Tokyo
- Termini: Nishi-magome; Oshiage
- Stations: 20
- Color on map: Rose

Service
- Type: Rapid transit, Heavy rail
- System: Tokyo subway (Toei Subway)
- Operator: Tokyo Metropolitan Bureau of Transportation
- Depot: Magome
- Rolling stock: Toei 5500 series, etc.
- Daily ridership: 718,855 (FY2016)

History
- Opened: 4 December 1960; 65 years ago
- Last extension: 1968

Technical
- Line length: 18.3 km (11.4 mi)
- Track gauge: 1,435 mm (4 ft 8 1/2 in) standard gauge
- Minimum radius: 161 m (528 ft)
- Electrification: Overhead line, 1,500 V DC
- Operating speed: 70 km/h (43 mph)
- Signalling: Automatic closed block
- Train protection system: C-ATS
- Maximum incline: 3.5%
Route map
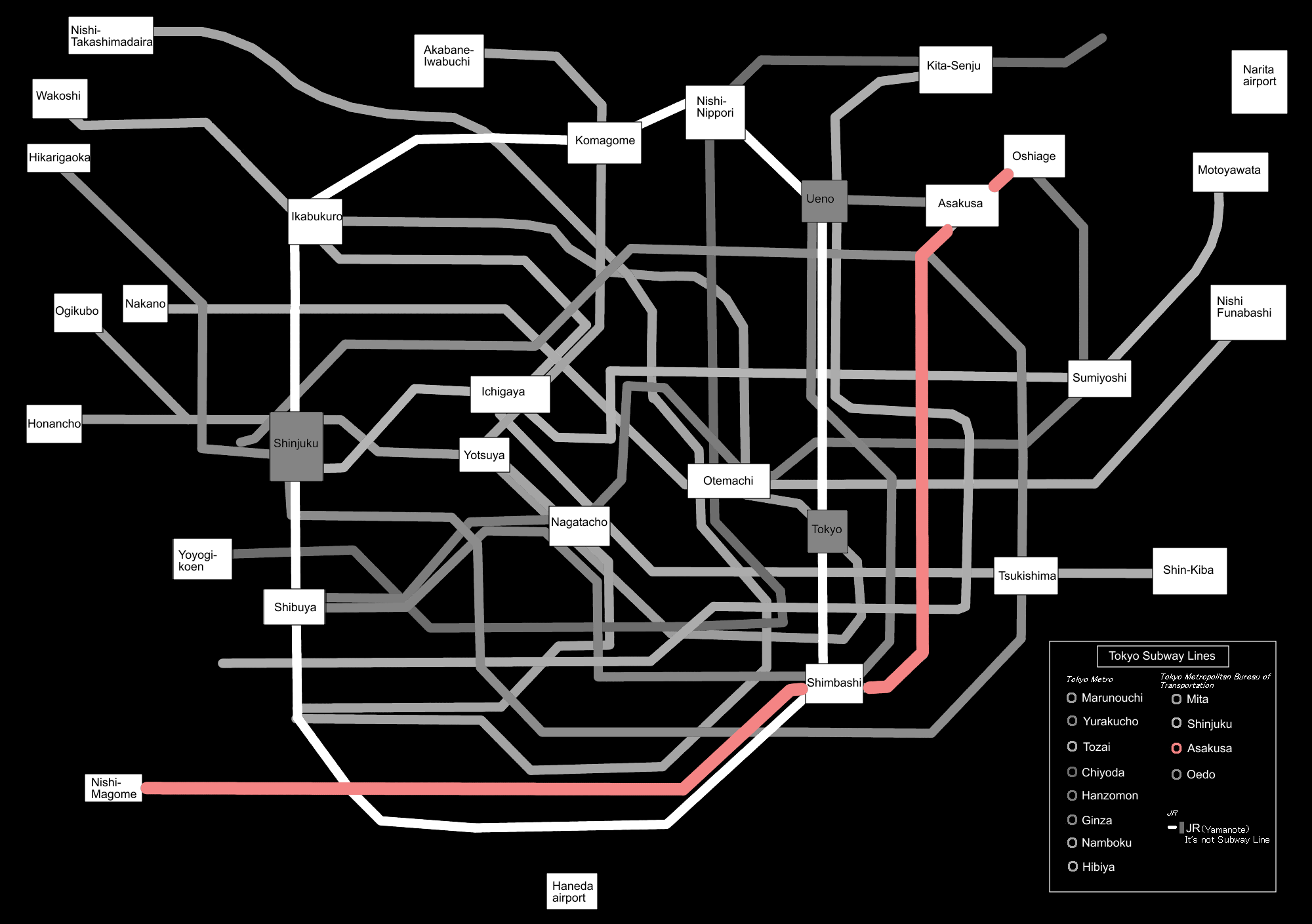

The Toei Asakusa Line (都営浅草線, Toei Asakusa-sen) is a subway line in Tokyo, Japan, operated by the municipal subway operator Toei Subway. The line runs between Nishi-magome in Ōta and Oshiage in Sumida. The line is named after the Asakusa district, a cultural center of Tokyo, under which it passes.

The Asakusa Line was the first subway line in Japan to offer through services with a private railway. Today, it has more through services to other lines than any other subway line in Tokyo. Keikyu operates through trains on the Keikyu Main Line to Misakiguchi and the Keikyu Airport Line to Haneda Airport Domestic Terminal. Keisei Electric Railway operates through trains on the Keisei Oshiage Line to Inba-Nihon-Idai and the Keisei Main Line to Narita Airport Terminal 1, and Shibayama Railway runs trains via the Keisei Main Line and the Shibayama Railway Line to Shibayama-Chiyoda. Via its through services with Keisei and Keikyu, the Asakusa line is the only train line that offers a direct connection between Tokyo's two main airports.

The Asakusa Line is often split into two routes: Oshiage–Sengakuji and Sengakuji–Nishi-magome; only some trains make all station stops on the line, as many trains travel on the Keikyu Main Line south of Sengakuji.

On maps and signboards, the line is shown in the color rose. Stations carry the letter "A" followed by a two-digit number inside a more reddish vermilion circle.

In fiscal year 2023, the Asakusa Line was Toei's most profitable line, earning 8.67 billion yen in surplus (a 26.4% profit margin). It served 683,003 passengers on average per day, the third highest in the Toei network.

== Services ==
- Local (普通 futsū) trains operate between Nishi-Magome and Sengakuji approximately every ten minutes and are timed to connect to Keikyu through service trains at Sengakuji.
- Rapid service (快速 kaisoku) trains operate between Nishi-Magome and Keisei Sakura Station approximately every twenty minutes. They make all station stops on the Asakusa Line.
- Limited Express (快特 kaitoku) trains operate approximately every twenty minutes. They generally use Keikyu rolling stock and have a southern terminus at Misakiguchi Station or Keikyu Kurihama Station. They operate as Limited Express trains only on the Keikyu Line, and provide local service on the Asakusa Line and local/rapid services on the Keisei Oshiage Line. Their northern terminus is generally either Aoto Station or Keisei Takasago Station, but select trains operate to Narita International Airport.
- Limited Express (快特 kaitoku) trains operate approximately every twenty minutes and make all stops (local service) on the Asakusa Line, providing Limited Express service on the Keikyu Line between Sengakuji and Haneda Airport Domestic Terminal. Their northern terminus is usually either Inzai-Makinohara Station or Inba-Nihon-Idai Station on the Hokuso Railway.
- Airport Limited Express (エアポート快特 eapōto kaitoku) trains operate approximately every twenty minutes, and skip certain stations while operating on the Asakusa Line. Their northern terminus alternates between "Access Express" (アクセス特急 akusesu tokkyū) service to Narita International Airport and Limited Express service to either Aoto or Takasago. The total travel time from Haneda Airport to Narita Airport on this train is approximately one hour and 46 minutes.
- Express (急行 kyūkō) Trains operate as Express trains only on the Keikyu Line, and provide local services on the Asakusa Line and the Keisei Line. These trains only operate southwards. Their southern terminus is usually Haneda Airport Domestic Terminal. However, there is one train on weekends that operates towards Zushi-Hayama Station (As of 8 October 2025). Service for this train will start at Keisei Takasago Station and will arrive at Oshiage Station at 22:55.

== History ==
=== Planning (1920–1941) ===
The original plan for what is now the Asakusa Line was included in a report Tokyo City Notification No. 2 of 1920 (大正9年東京市告示第2号) in 1920. The proposal outlined a route as Line 1 connecting “Shinagawa Yatsuyama – Shimbashi – Tsukiji – Ryogoku West – Kaminarimon – Oshiage”.

A construction patent for this route was granted to the Tokyo Underground Light rail and Tokyo Railway (東京鉄道). However, following the Great Kantō Earthquake of 1923, the patent was revoked along with those for other planned lines because construction had not yet commenced.

On September 1, 1941, following the establishment of the Teito Rapid Transit Authority, all route licenses held by Tokyo City, the Tokyo Underground Railway, the Tokyo Rapid Railway, and the Keihin Underground Railway were transferred to the Teito Subway in exchange for a fee.

The routes for which licenses had been granted as of 1941 and which were later taken over for the construction of the Asakusa Line are as follows:

- Tokyo Underground Railway: Mita nichome – Gotanda – Magome
- Keihin Underground Railway: Shimbashi – Shinagawa
- Tokyo Rapid Railway: Shimbashi – Tokyo
- Tokyo City: Tokyo – Sugamo

=== Construction and opening ===
The line number is Line 1, because it was technically the first subway line in Tokyo to be planned in the 1920s as an underground route connecting Keikyu and Keisei Electric Railway via Shinagawa, eventually allowing for through trains between these two railways. In its original plan form, the line would have actually bypassed Asakusa Station entirely. However, the plan was changed to take advantage of the existing Tobu Isesaki Line (section now named as the Tobu Skytree Line) and Tokyo Metro Ginza Line connections at Asakusa.

The Toei Asakusa Line was the first subway line constructed by the Tokyo Metropolitan Government.

Construction of this line began on 27 August 1956 after years of delays, and the initial 3.2 km (2.0 mi) segment between Oshiage and Asakusabashi opened on 4 December 1960. The line then opened in stages from north to south:

- May 1962: Asakusabashi to Higashi-Nihombashi
- September 1962: Higashi-Nihombashi to Ningyōchō
- February 1963: Ningyōchō to Higashi-Ginza
- December 1963: Higashi-Ginza to Shimbashi
- October 1964: Shimbashi to Daimon
- June 1968: Daimon to Sengakuji (Through service with Keikyū begins)
- 15 November 1968: Sengakuji to Nishi-Magome

The line was named Asakusa Line on 1 July 1978.

From 1998 to 2002, the Asakusa Line was used as part of a rail connection between Tokyo's two major airports, Haneda and Narita. While a few trains still run between the airports, the service has greatly diminished in frequency since 2002.

In 2005, a research group of government, metropolitan and railway company officials proposed that the Asakusa Line be connected to Tokyo Station via a spur to the north of Takarachō Station. This would provide Tokyo Station's first direct connection to the Toei subway network. It would also make it possible to reach Haneda Airport in 25 minutes (versus 35 minutes today) and Narita Airport in 40 minutes (versus 57 minutes today). This plan has yet to be finalized or formally adopted. Authorities are re-considering a similar plan as part of the infrastructure improvements for the 2020 Summer Olympics; the proposed line would cut travel time to Haneda from 30 minutes to 18 minutes, and to Narita from 55 minutes to 36 minutes, at a total cost of around 400 billion yen.

== Stations ==
- All stations are located in Tokyo.
- The Airport Limited Express/Access Express stops at stations marked "●", skips those marked "|". All other services stop at every station.

No.	Station	Distance in km (mi)		Airport services	Transfers	Location
No.	Station	Between stations	Total	Airport services	Transfers	Location
A-01	Nishi-magome 西馬込	—N/a	0 (0)			Ōta
A-02	Magome 馬込	1.2 (0.75)				Ōta
A-03	Nakanobu 中延	0.9 (0.56)	2.1 (1.3)		Ōimachi Line (OM04)	Shinagawa
A-04	Togoshi 戸越	1.1 (0.68)	3.2 (2.0)		Ikegami Line (Togoshi-ginza: IK03)	Shinagawa
A-05	Gotanda 五反田	1.6 (0.99)	4.8 (3.0)		Yamanote Line (JY23); Ikegami Line (IK01)	Shinagawa
A-06	Takanawadai 高輪台	0.7 (0.43)	5.5 (3.4)			Minato
↑Through-running services to/from ↑: Shinagawa, Kanagawa-shimmachi, Kanazawa-bunko via Main Line; Haneda Airport Terminal 1·2 via Airport Line; Zushi·Hayama via the Zushi Line; Keikyū Kurihama, Miurakaigan, Misakiguchi via Kurihama Line
A-07	Sengakuji 泉岳寺	1.4 (0.87)	6.9 (4.3)	●	Main Line (through service); Yamanote Line (Takanawa Gateway: JY26); Keihin–Tōhoku Line (Takanawa Gateway: JK21)	Minato
A-08	Mita 三田	1.1 (0.68)	8.0 (5.0)	●	Mita Line (I-04); Yamanote Line (Tamachi: JY27); Keihin–Tōhoku Line (Tamachi: JK22)	Minato
A-09	Daimon 大門	1.5 (0.93)	9.5 (5.9)	●	Ōedo Line (E-20); Yamanote Line (Hamamatsuchō: JY28); Keihin–Tōhoku Line (Hamamatsuchō: JK23); Haneda Airport Line (Hamamatsuchō: MO01)	Minato
A-10	Shimbashi 新橋	1.0 (0.62)	10.5 (6.5)	●	Ginza Line (G-08); Tōkaidō Line (JT02); Yamanote Line (JY29); Keihin–Tōhoku Line (JK24); Yokosuka Line (JO18); Yurikamome (U-01)	Minato
A-11	Higashi-ginza 東銀座	0.9 (0.56)	11.4 (7.1)	|	Hibiya Line (Hibiya: H-10); Underground passage to Ginza and Yūrakuchō stations	Chūō
A-12	Takaracho 宝町	0.8 (0.50)	12.2 (7.6)	|		Chūō
A-13	Nihombashi 日本橋	0.8 (0.50)	13.0 (8.1)	●	Ginza Line (G-11); Tōzai Line (T-10)	Chūō
A-14	Ningyocho 人形町	0.8 (0.50)	13.8 (8.6)	|	Hibiya Line (H-14); Hanzōmon Line (Suitengumae: Z-10)	Chūō
A-15	Higashi-nihombashi 東日本橋	0.7 (0.43)	14.5 (9.0)	●	Shinjuku Line (Bakuroyokoyama: S-09); Sōbu Line (Bakurochō: JO21)	Chūō
A-16	Asakusabashi 浅草橋	0.7 (0.43)	15.2 (9.4)	|	Chūō–Sōbu Line (JB20)	Taitō
A-17	Kuramae 蔵前	0.7 (0.43)	15.9 (9.9)	|	Ōedo Line (E-11)	Taitō
A-18	Asakusa 浅草	0.9 (0.56)	16.8 (10.4)	●	Ginza Line (G-19); Tobu Skytree Line (TS01)	Taitō
A-19	Honjo-azumabashi 本所吾妻橋	0.7 (0.43)	17.5 (10.9)	|		Sumida
A-20	Oshiage 押上	0.8 (0.50)	18.3 (11.4)	●	Oshiage Line (KS45; through service); Hanzōmon Line (Z-14); Tobu Skytree Line (TS03)	Sumida
↓ Through-running services to/from ↓: Aoto via Oshiage Line; Keisei Takasago, Keisei Sakura, Sōgosandō, Keisei Narita, Narita Airport Terminal 1 via Main Line; Inzai-Makinohara, Imba Nihon-idai via Hokusō Line; Narita Airport Terminal 1 via Narita Sky Access Line; Shibayama-Chiyoda via the Higashi-Narita Line and Shibayama Railway Line

== Rolling stock ==
A variety of rolling stock is in use due to the large number of through service operators on the line, all of which use standard gauge tracks and 1,500 V DC electrification via overhead lines. Currently, six operators run trains onto the Asakusa Line, the most of any Tokyo subway line, and the line is unique as the only subway line in Tokyo with through services onto standard gauge railways (all other through services are with narrow gauge lines).

=== Toei ===
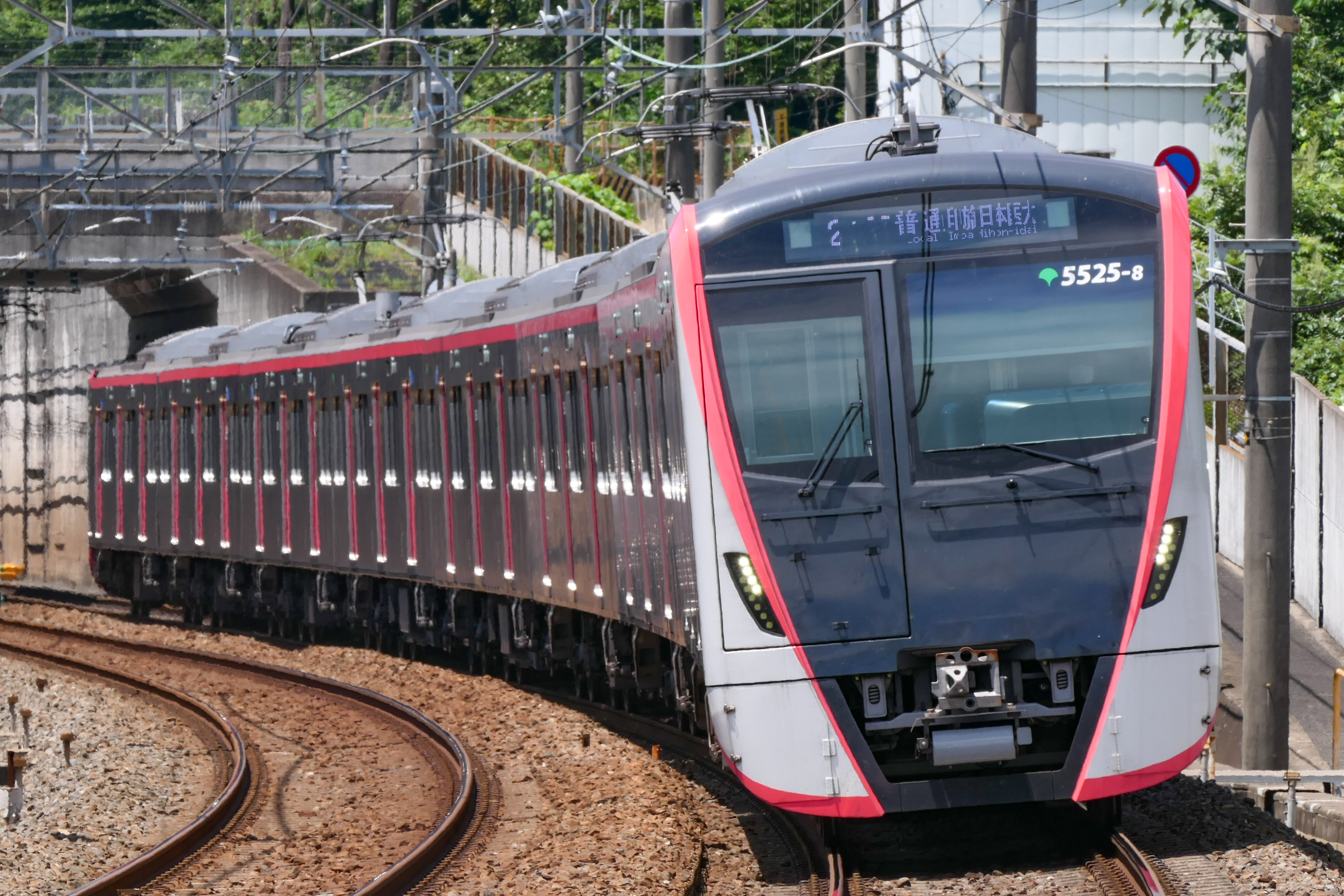
A Toei 5500 series EMU
- Toei 5500 series

=== Keisei Electric Railway ===
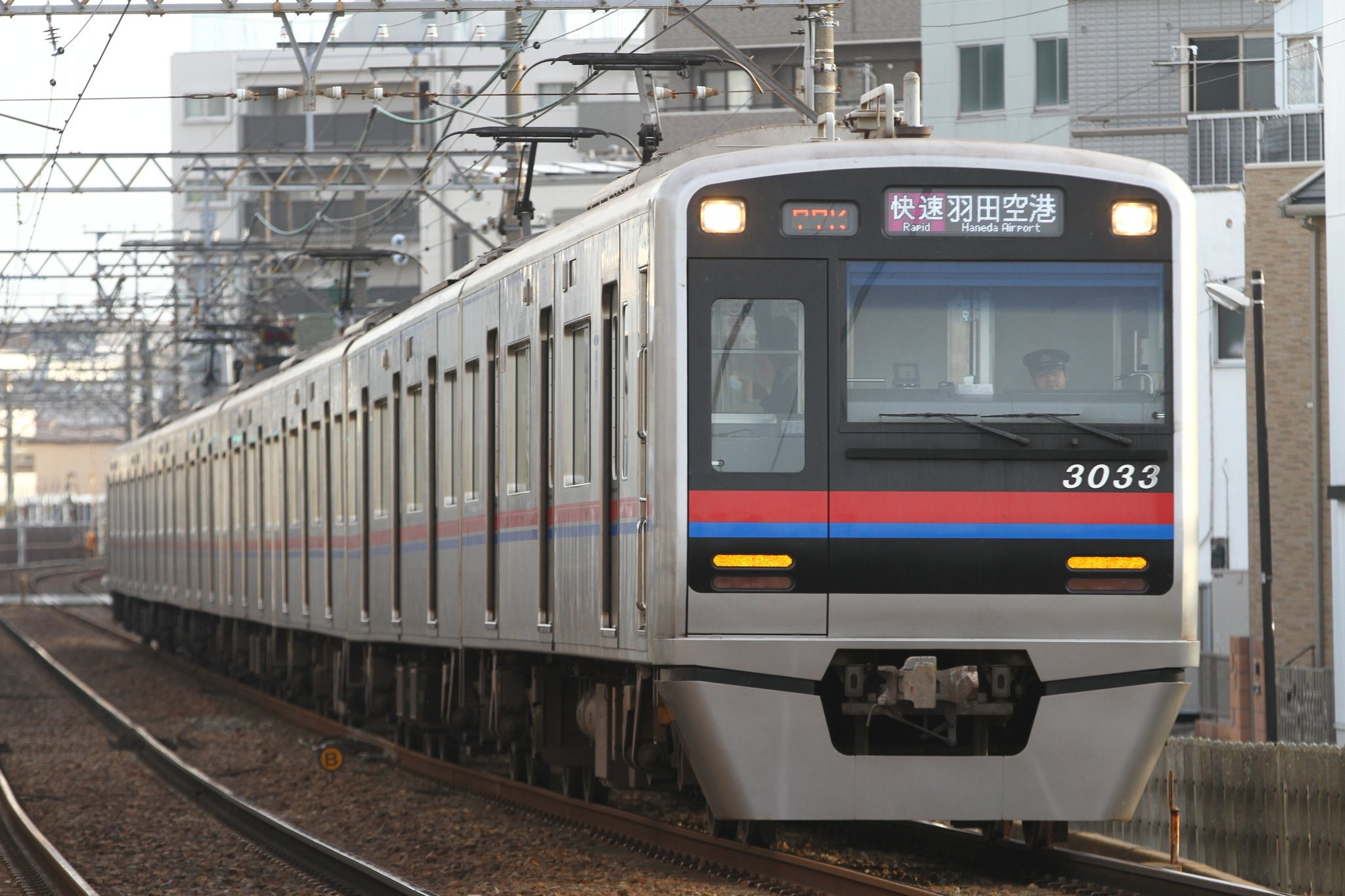
A Keisei 3000 series EMU

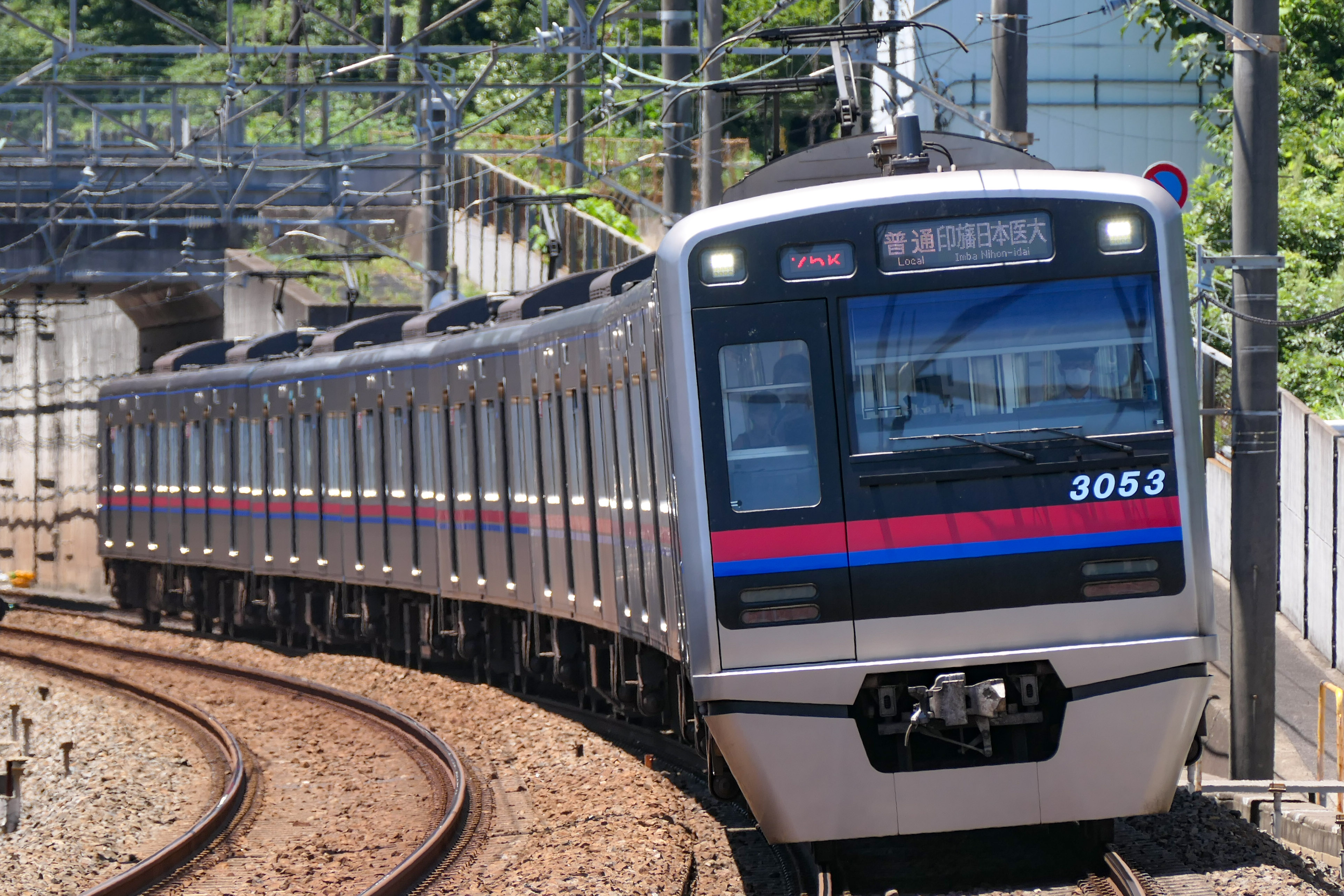
A Keisei 3050 series EMU

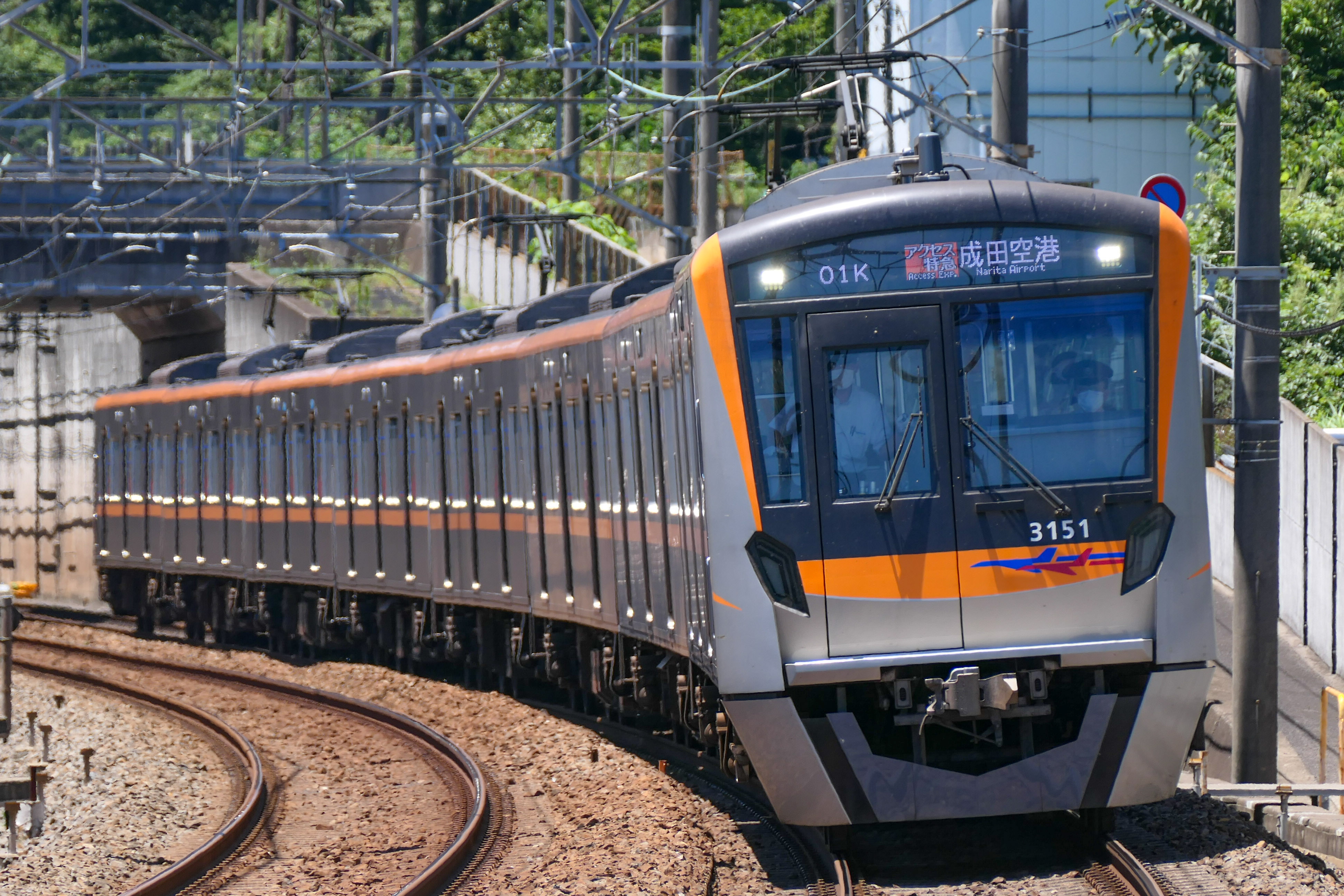
A Keisei 3100 series EMU

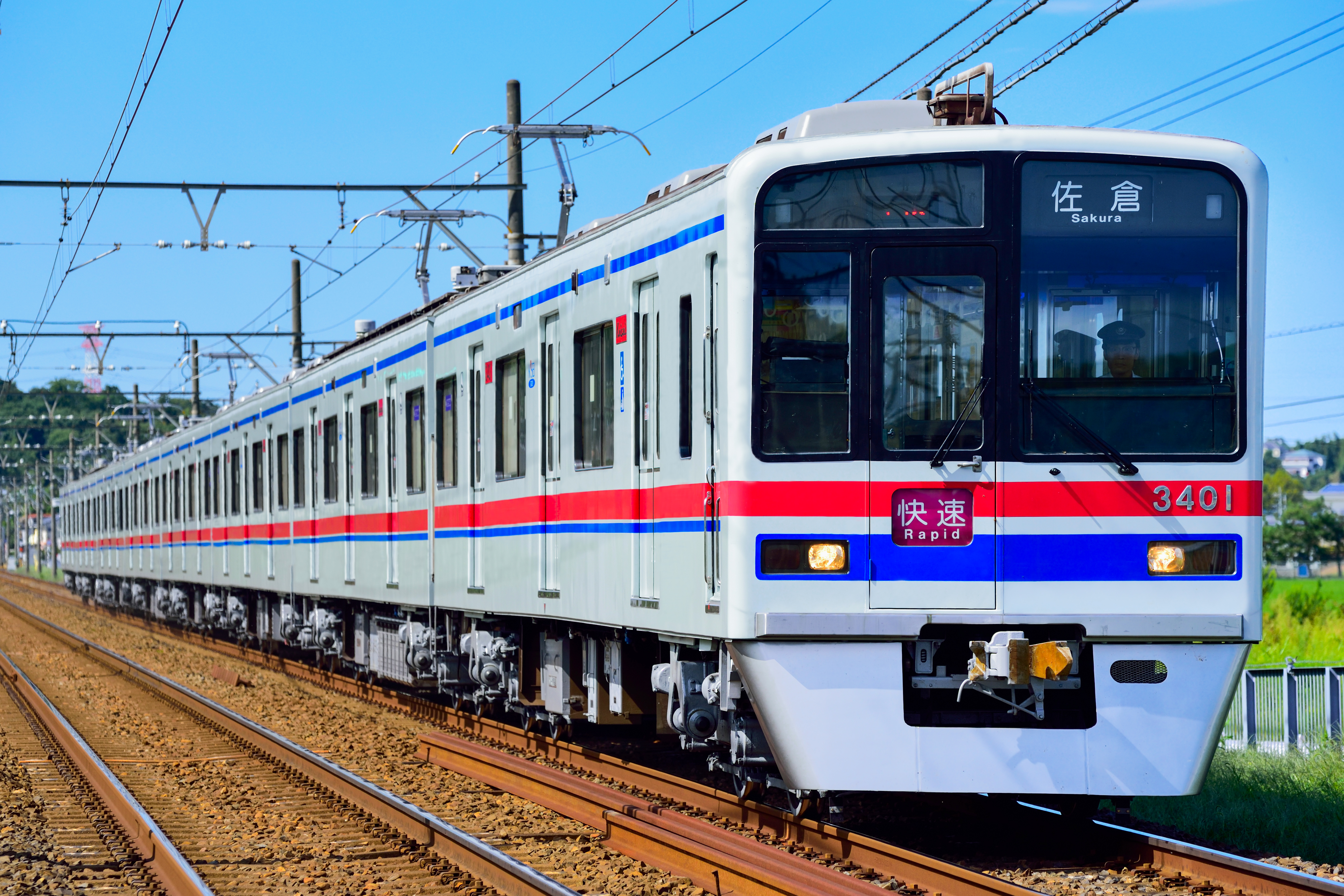
A Keisei 3400 series EMU

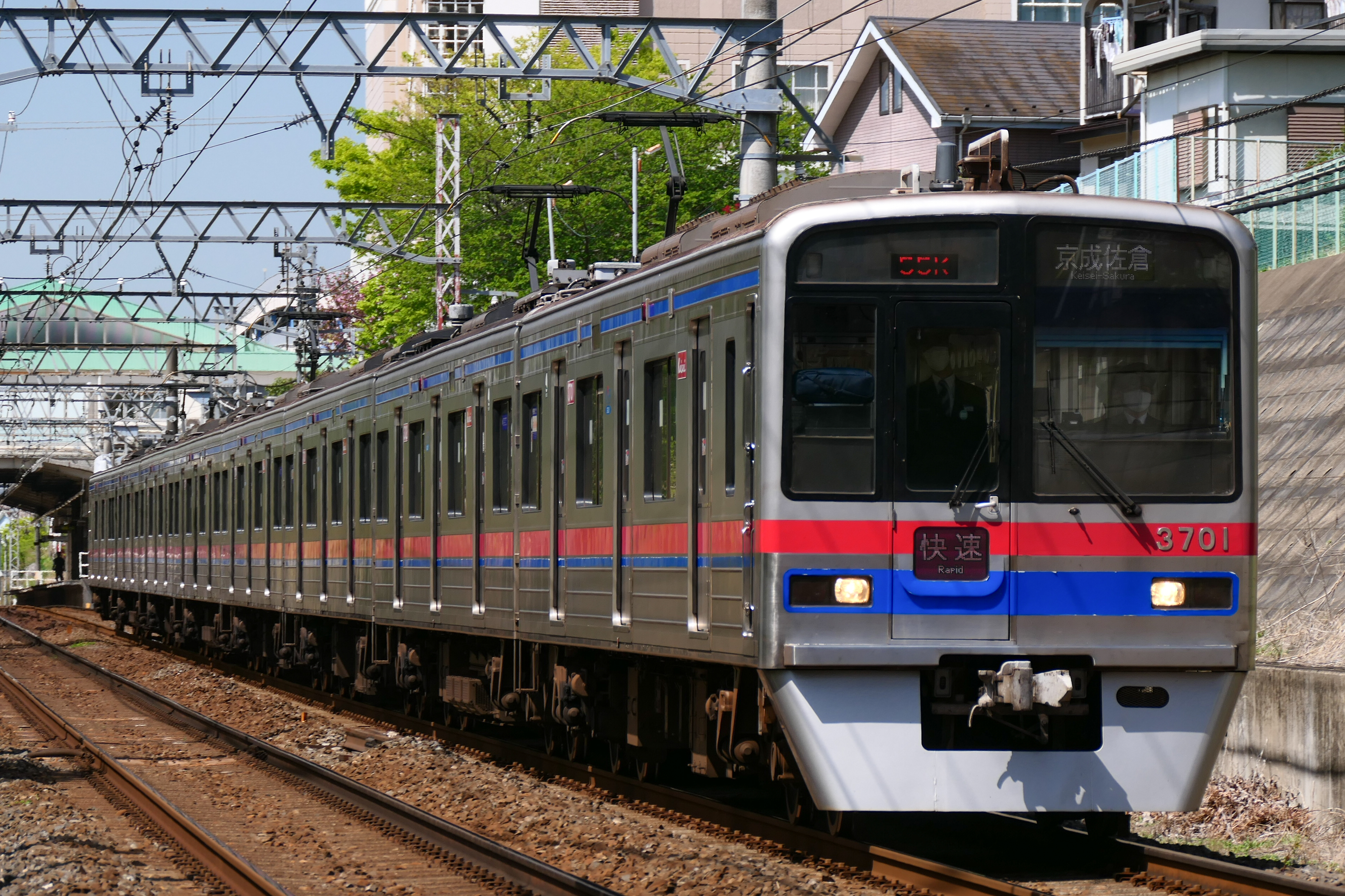
A Keisei 3700 series EMU
- Keisei 3000 series
- Keisei 3050 series
- Keisei 3100 series
- Keisei 3400 series
- Keisei 3700 series

=== Keikyu ===
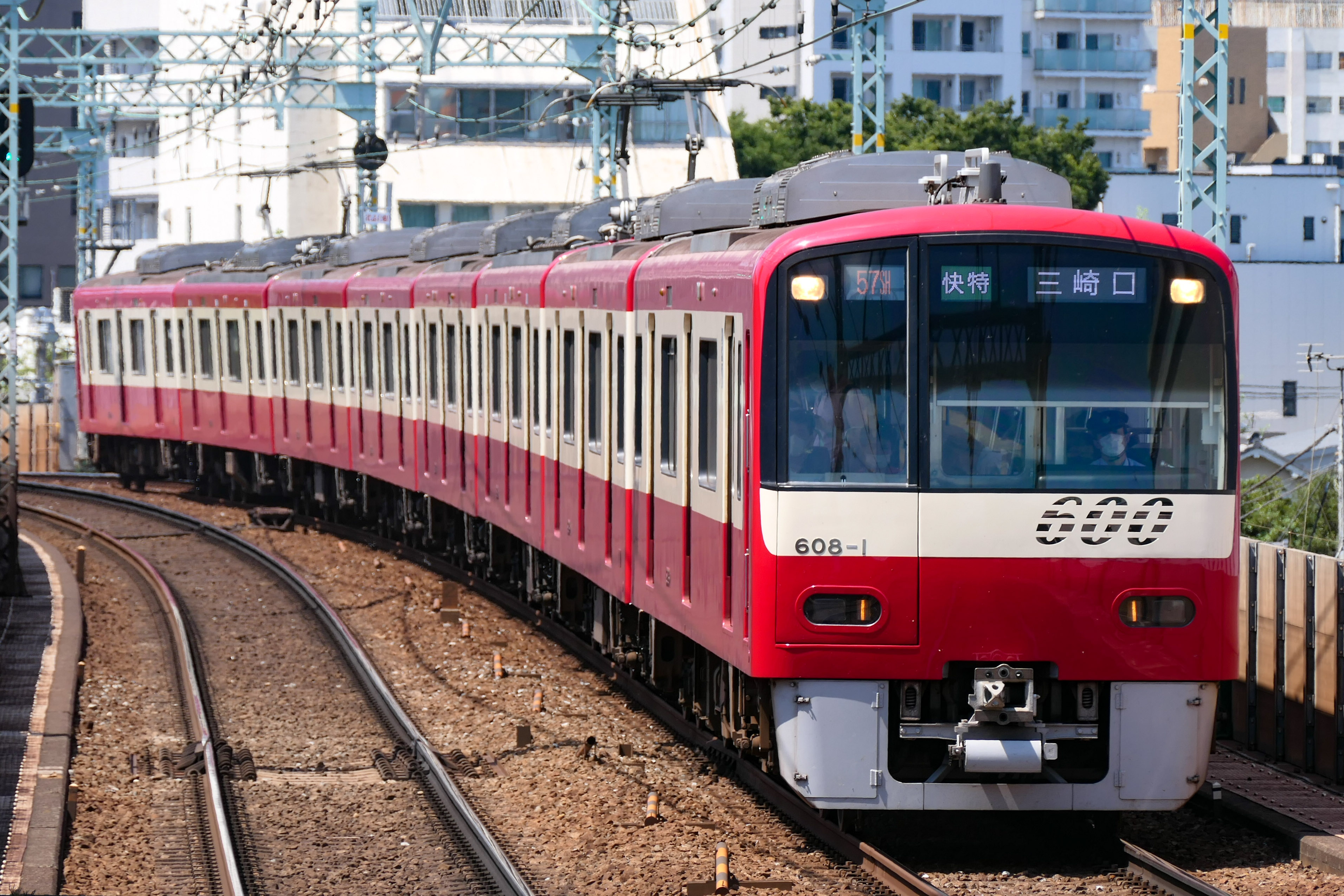
A Keikyu 600 series EMU

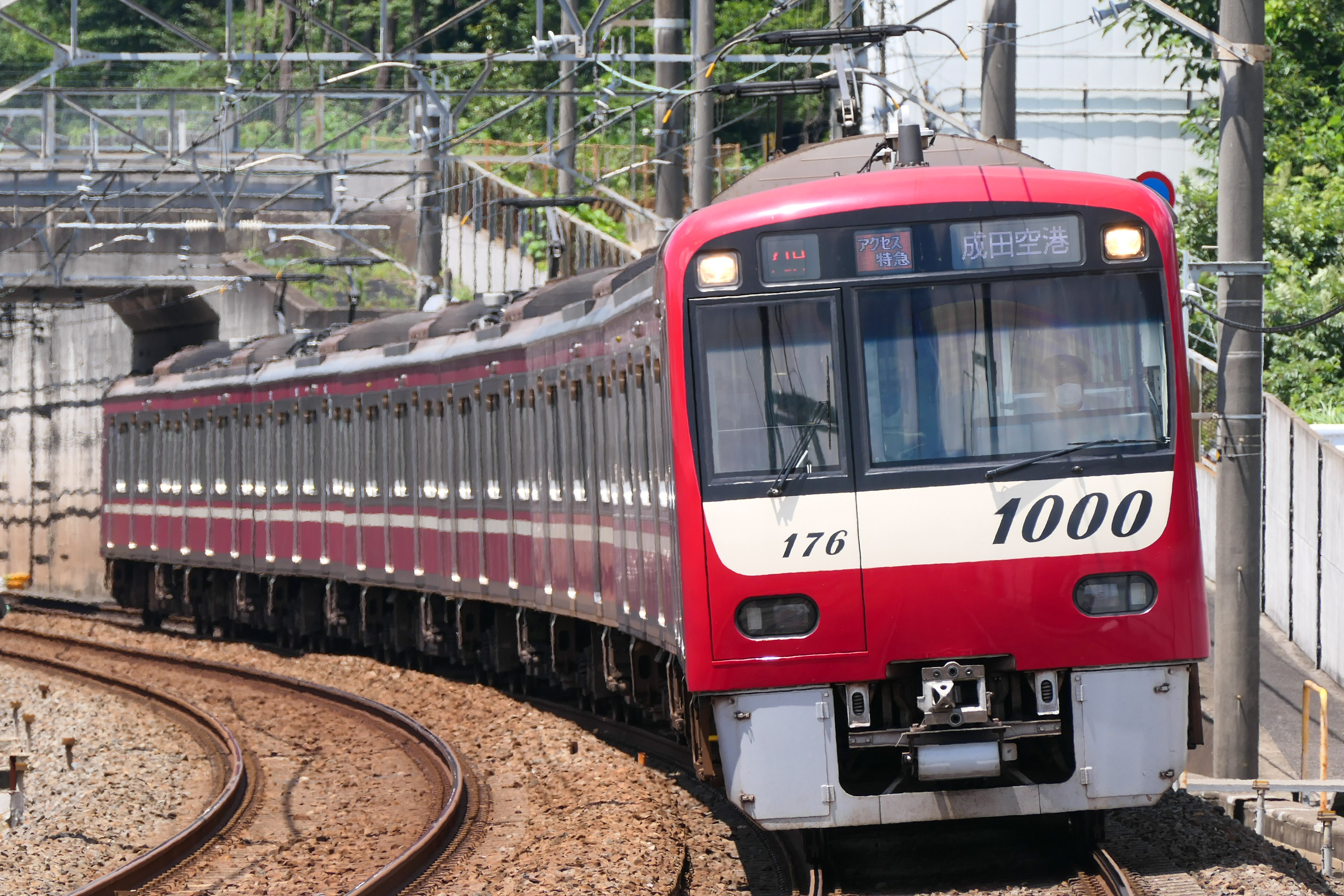
A Keikyu N1000 series EMU

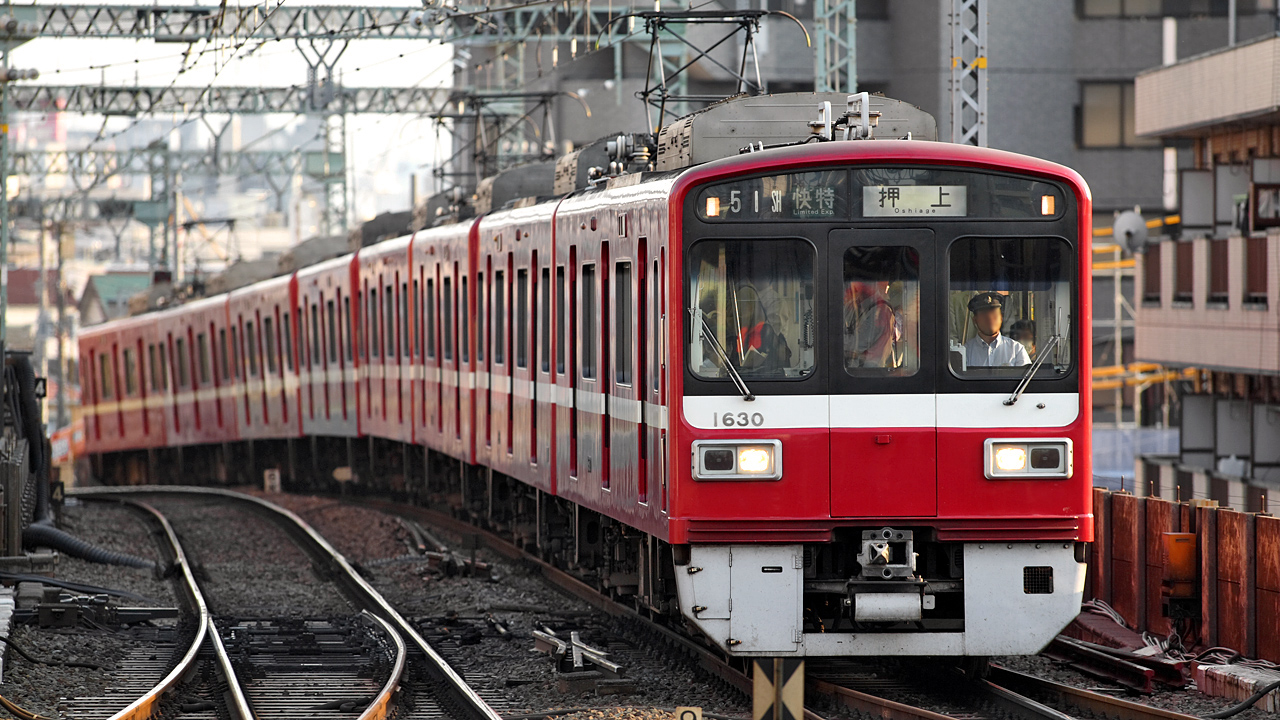
A Keikyu 1500 series EMU
- Keikyu 600 series
- Keikyu N1000 series
- Keikyu 1500 series

=== Hokuso Railway ===
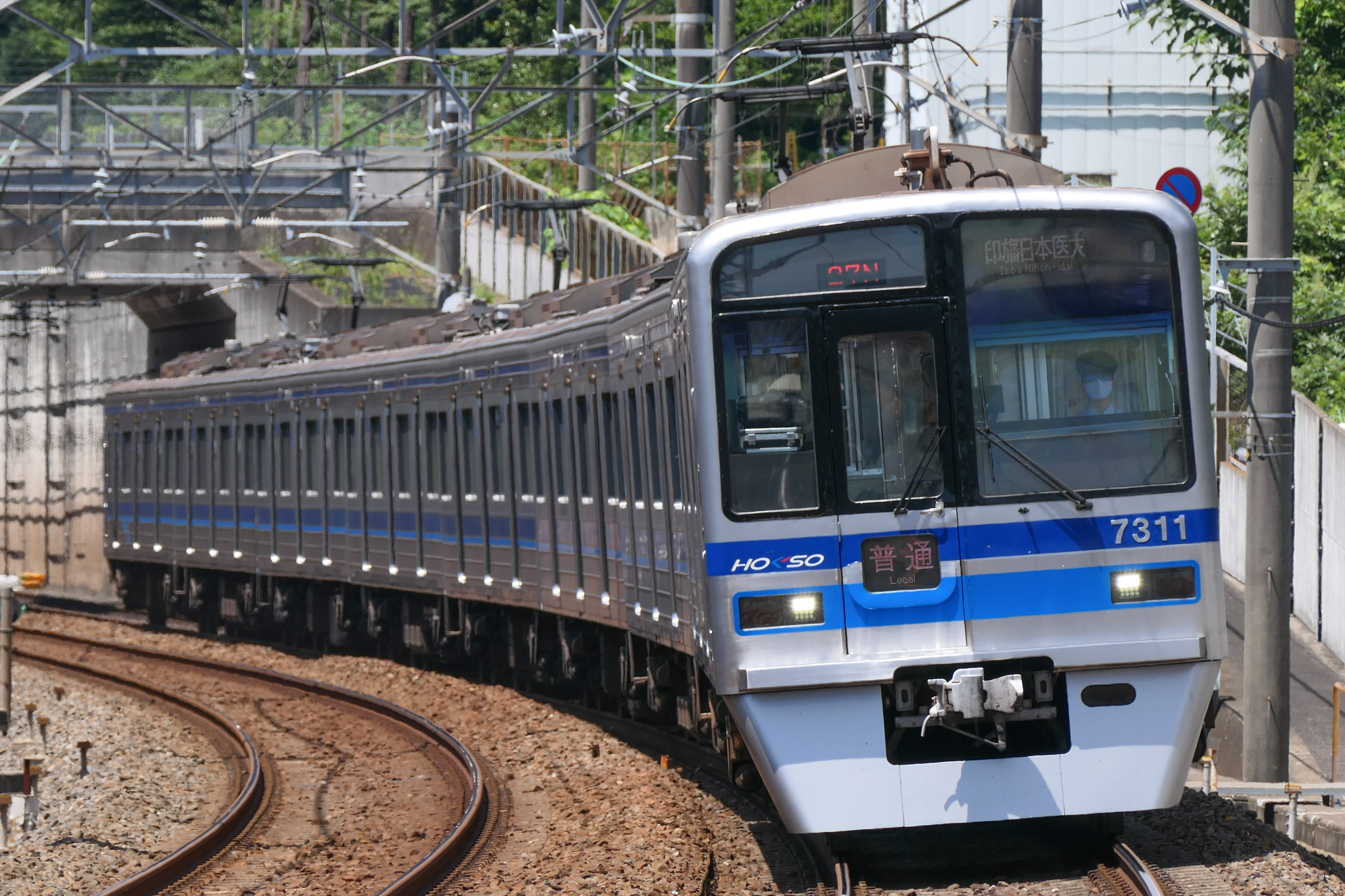
A Hokuso 7300 series EMU

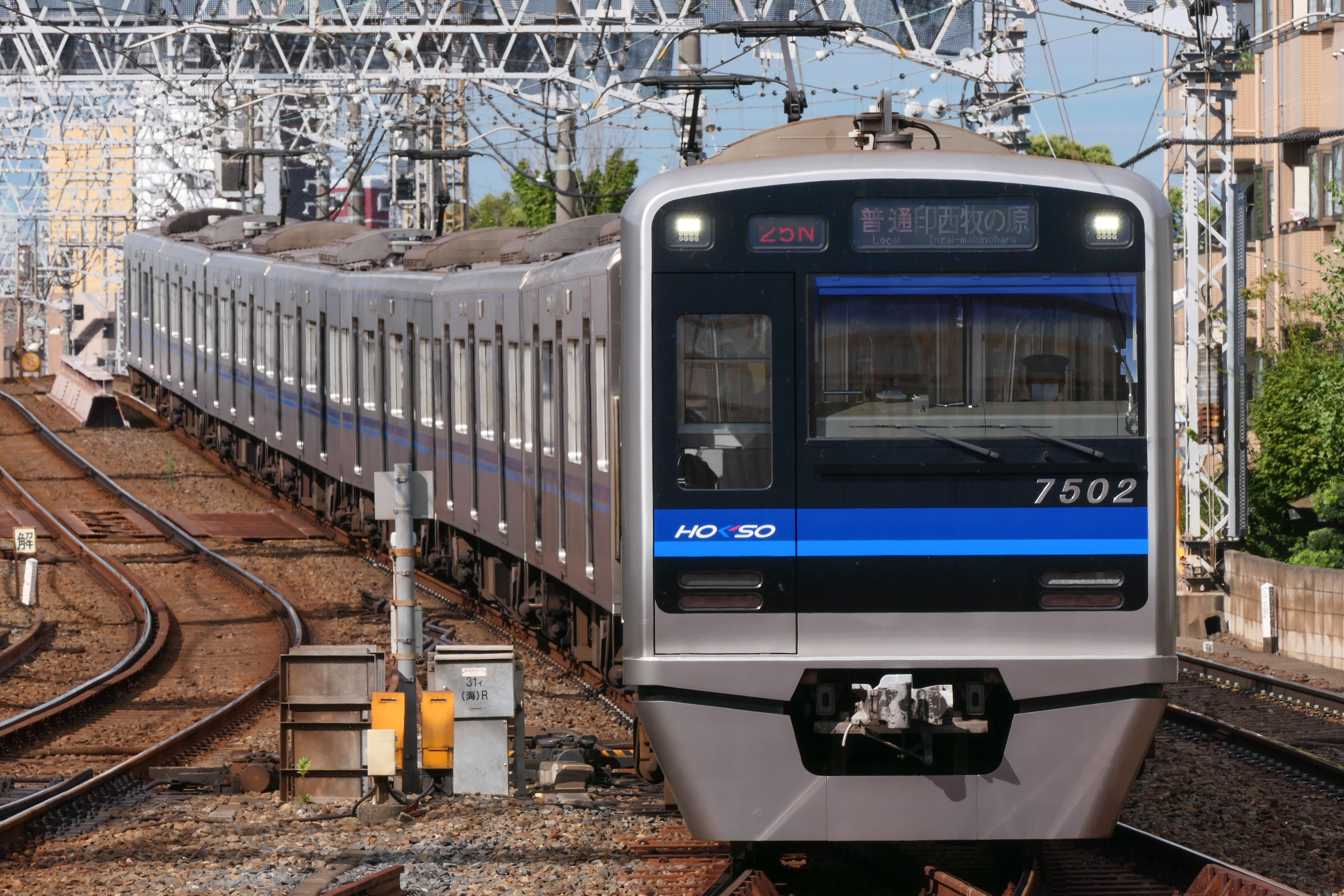
A Hokuso 7500 series EMU
- Hokuso 7300 series
- Hokuso 7500 series

=== Chiba New Town Railway ===
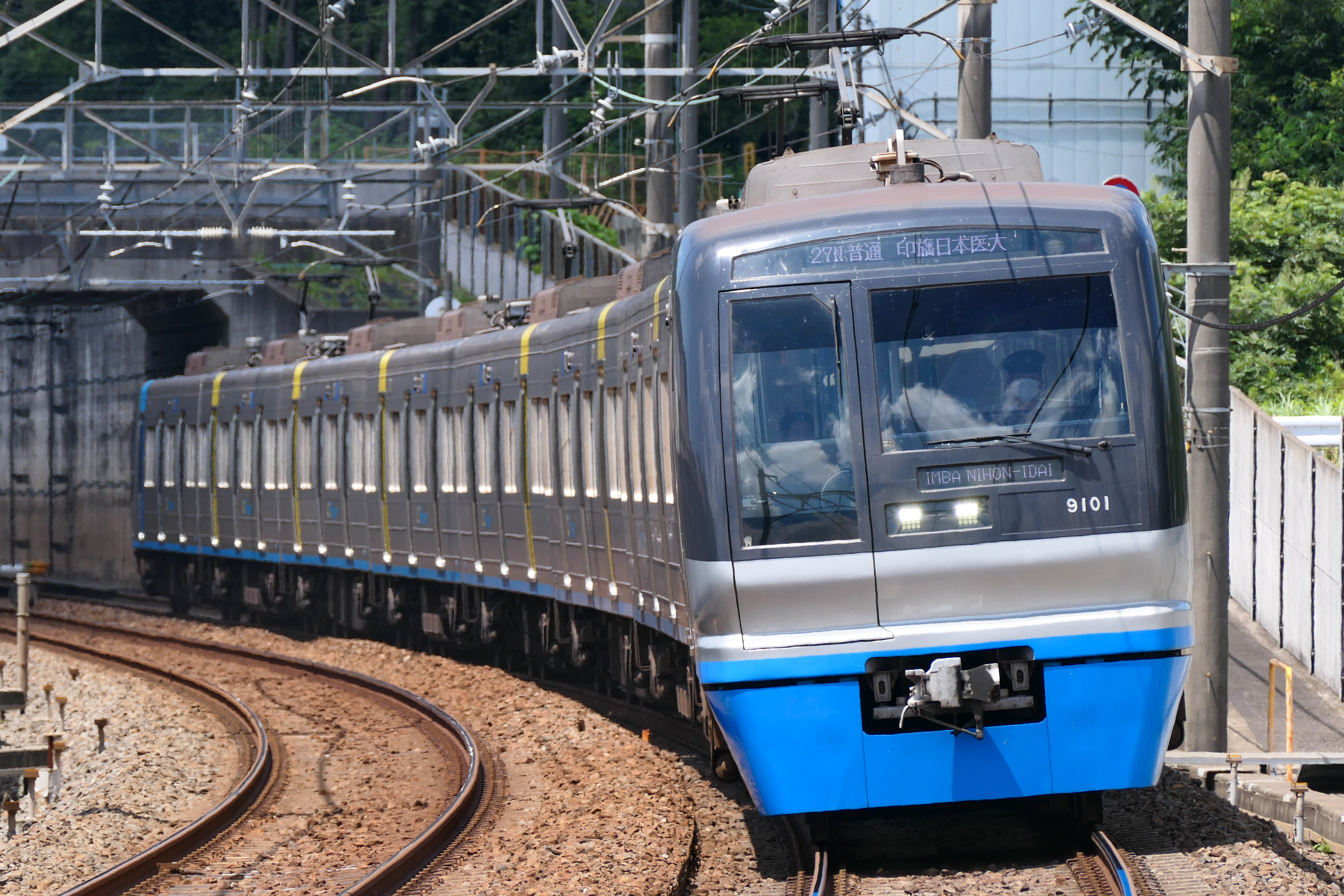
A Chiba New Town Railway 9100 series

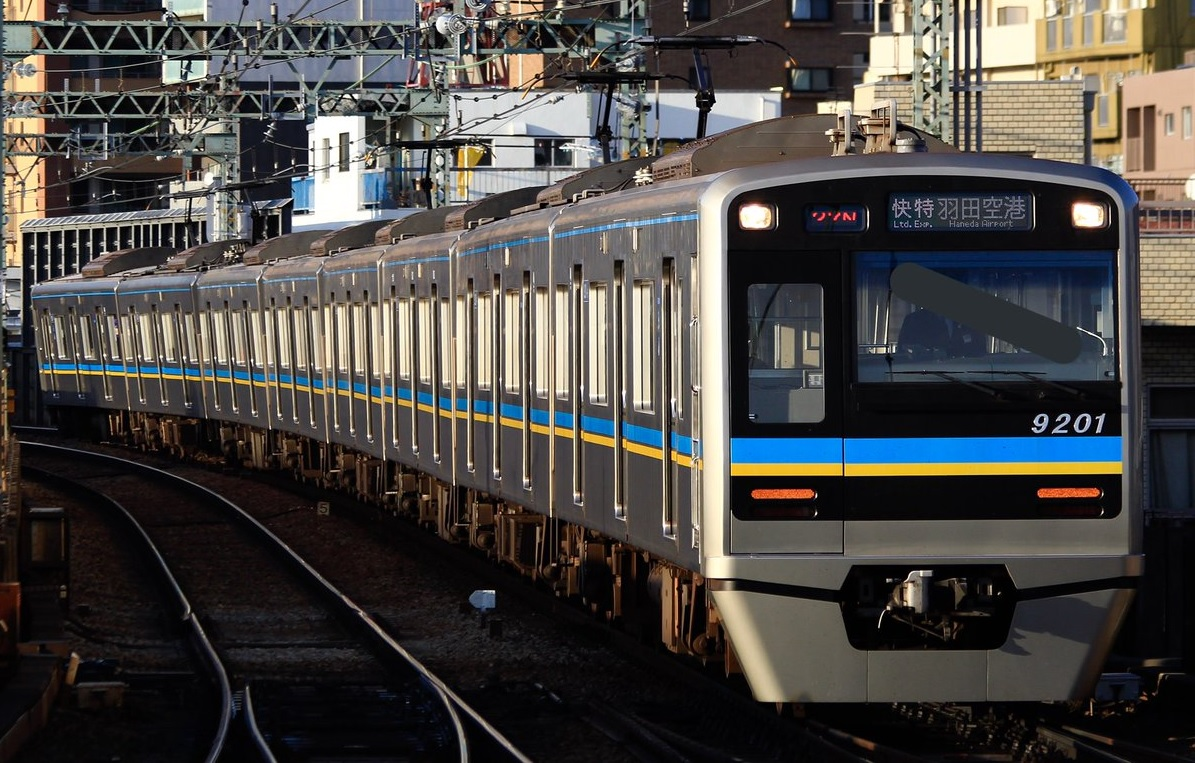
A Chiba New Town Railway 9200 series EMU

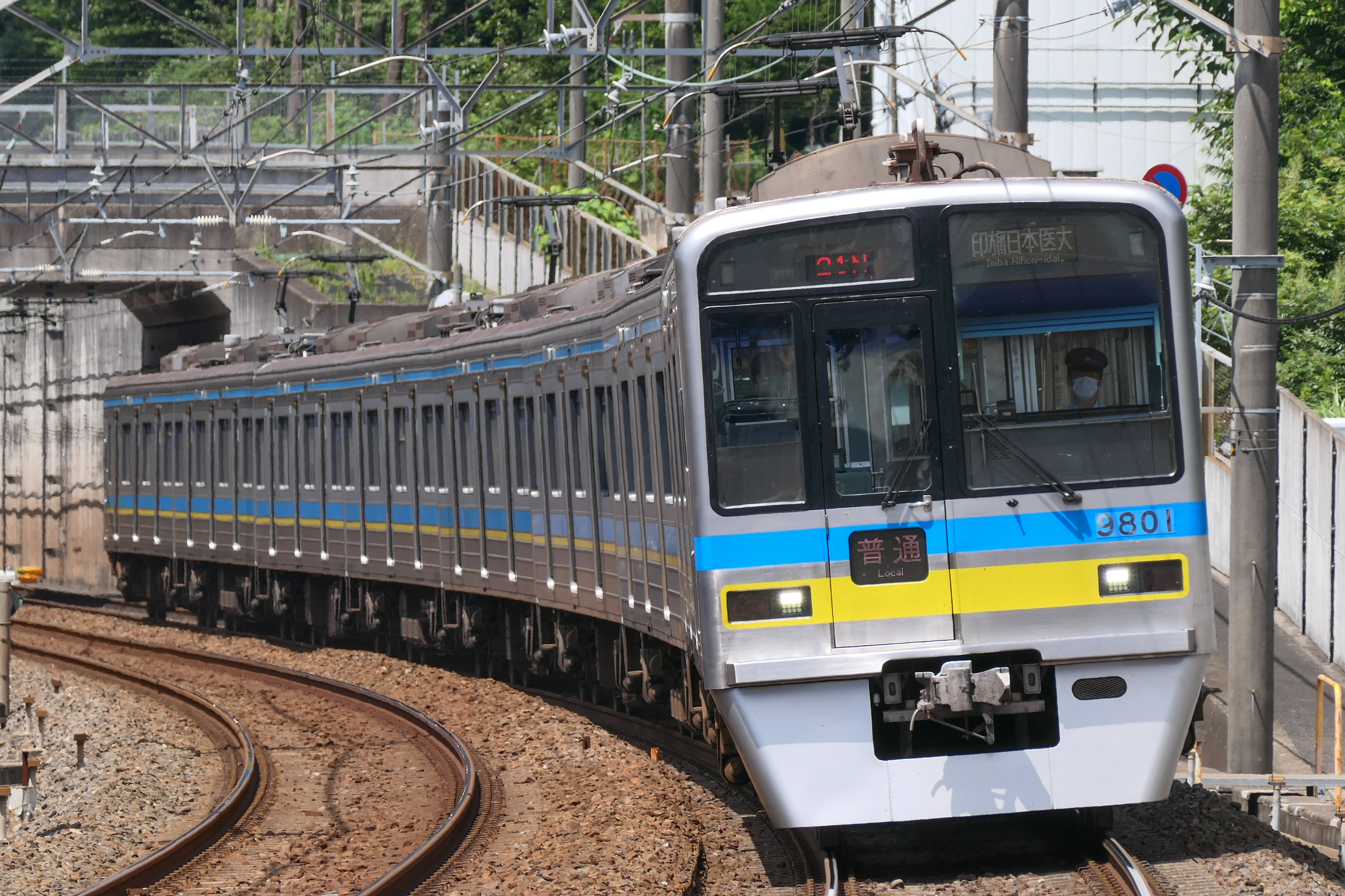
A Chiba New Town Railway 9800 series
- Chiba New Town Railway 9100 series
- Chiba New Town Railway 9200 series
- Chiba New Town Railway 9800 series

=== Shibayama Railway ===
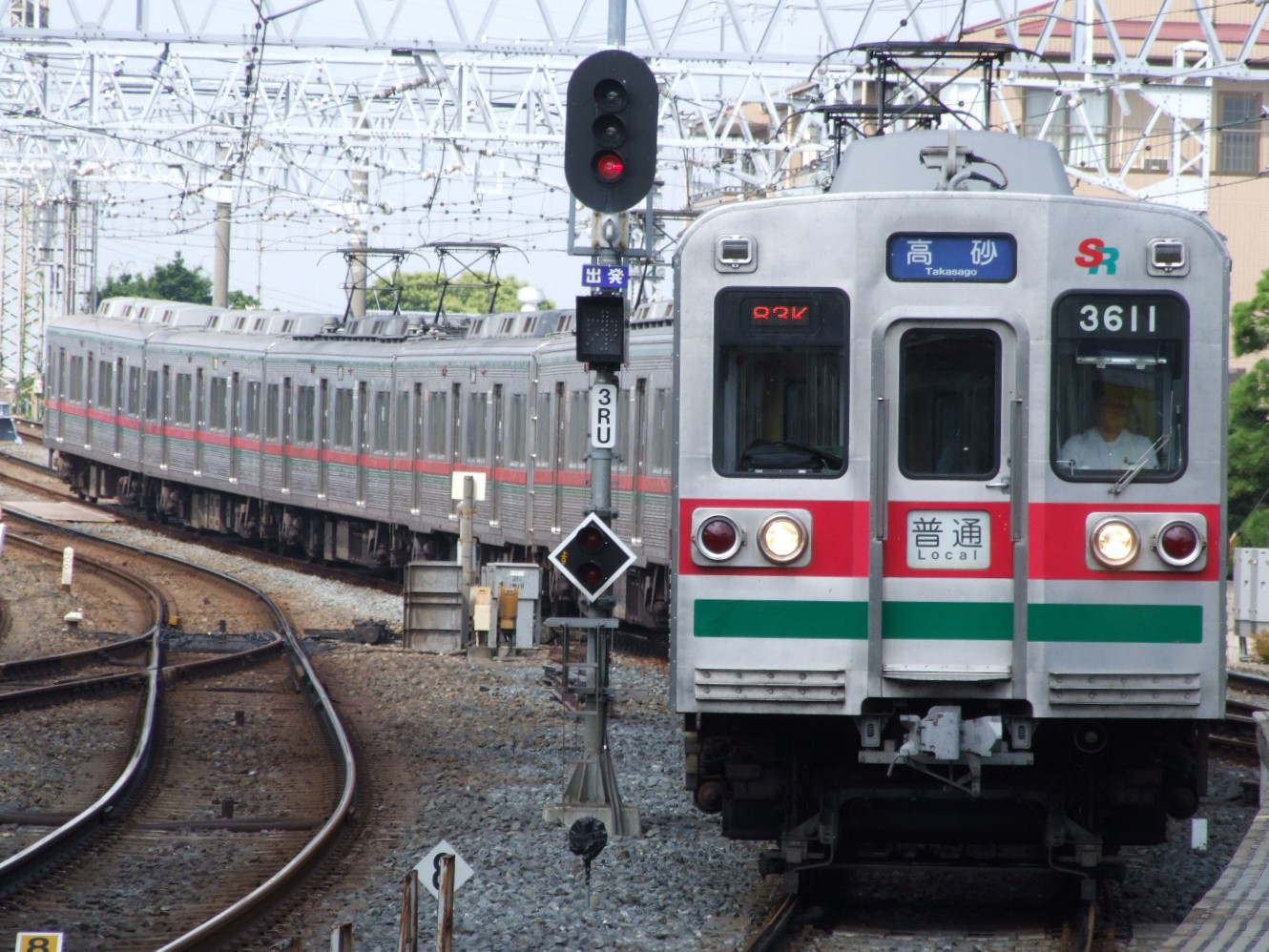
A Shibayama 3600 series EMU
- Shibayama 3600 series

=== Former rolling stock ===
- Toei 5000 series
- Toei 5200 series
- Toei 5300 series
- Keikyu 1000 series
- Keisei 3000 series (original type)
- Keisei 3050 series (original type)
- Keisei 3100 series (original type)
- Keisei 3150 series
- Keisei 3200 series
- Keisei 3300 series
- Keisei 3500 series
- Hokuso 7000 series
- Hokuso 7050 series
- Hokuso 7150 series
- Hokuso 7250 series
- Hokuso 7260 series
- Chiba New Town Railway 9000 series
