= Takarachō Station =

Metro station in Tokyo, Japan

Coordinates: 35.675452°N 139.7719°E

Takarachō Station 宝町駅

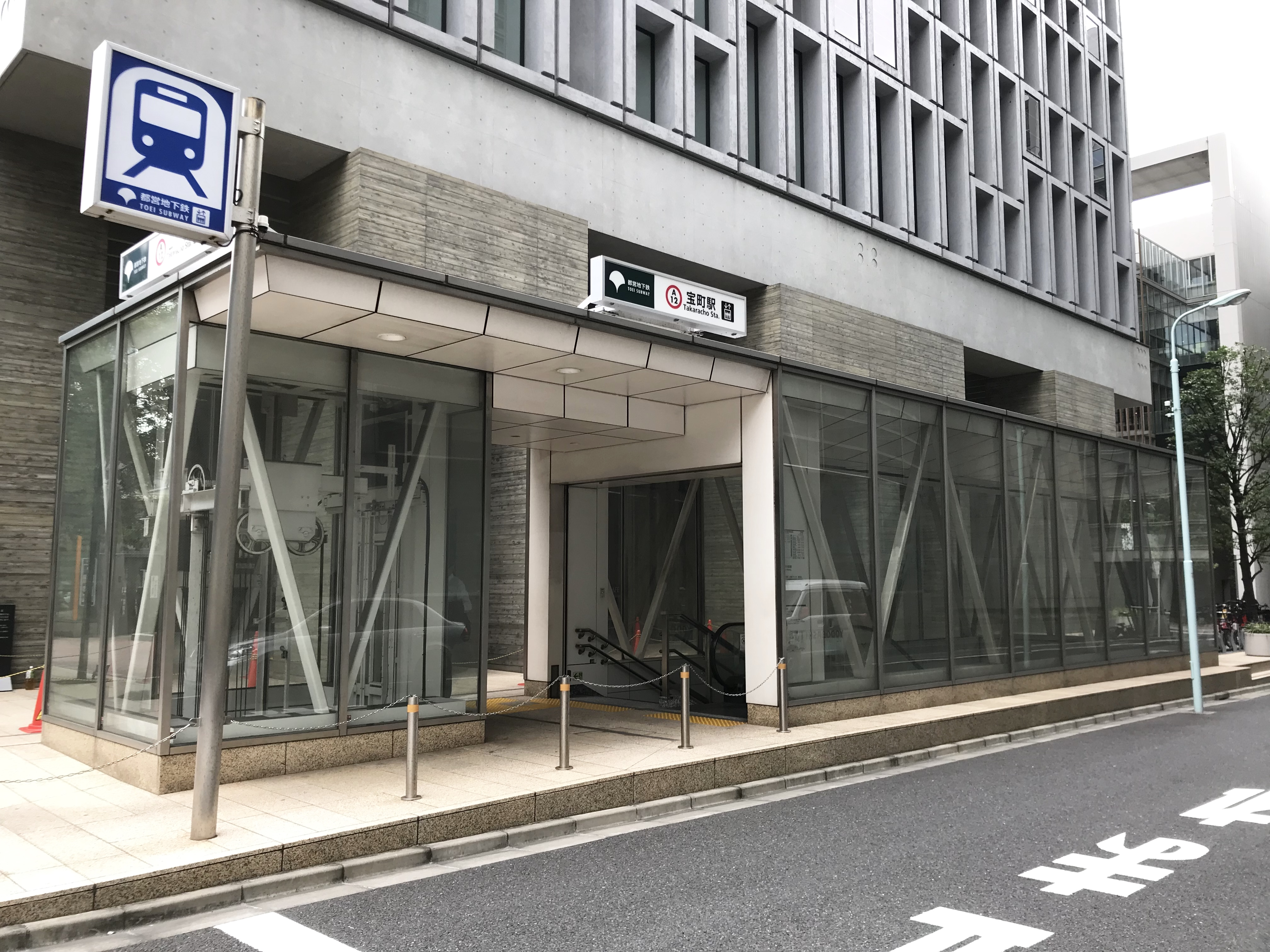
- Exit A8 in August 2019

General information
- Location: 2-13-11-saki Kyōbashi Town, Chūō City, Tokyo; Japan
- Operator: Toei Subway
- Line: Toei Asakusa Line
- Platforms: 2 side platforms
- Tracks: 2

Construction
- Structure type: Underground

Other information
- Station code: A-12

History
- Opened: 28 February 1963; 63 years ago

Services
Preceding station	Toei Subway	Following station
Higashi-ginza towards Nishi-magome	Asakusa Line	Nihombashi towards Oshiage
Location
- Location within Tokyo Yamanote Loop Location within Tokyo wards area Location within Japan

Takarachō Station (宝町駅, Takarachō-eki) is Station A-12 on the Toei Asakusa Line of the Tokyo Subway network in Japan. It is located underground in the Kyōbashi neighborhood of Chūō, Tokyo.

== Station layout ==
Takaracho Station has two side platforms serving the line's two tracks.

=== Platforms ===
1	Asakusa Line	for Shimbashi and Nishi-magome; Keikyū Main Line for Haneda Airport (International Terminal and Domestic Terminal) and Misakiguchi
2	Asakusa Line	for Nihombashi and Oshiage; Keisei Main Line for Narita Airport (Terminal 2·3 and Terminal 1); Narita Sky Access Line for Narita Airport; Hokusō Line for Imba Nihon-idai; Shibayama Railway Line for Shibayama-Chiyoda

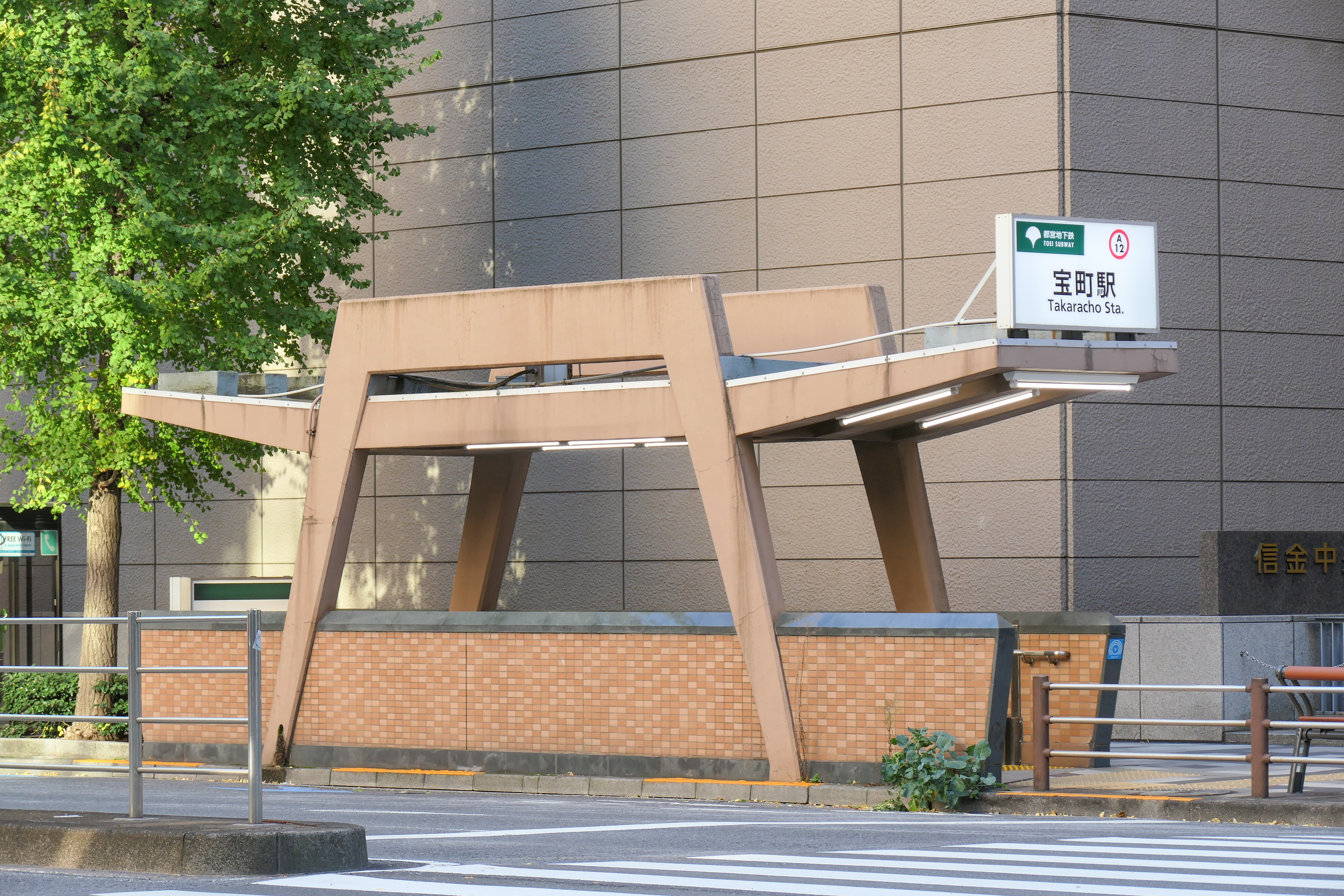
Exit A4

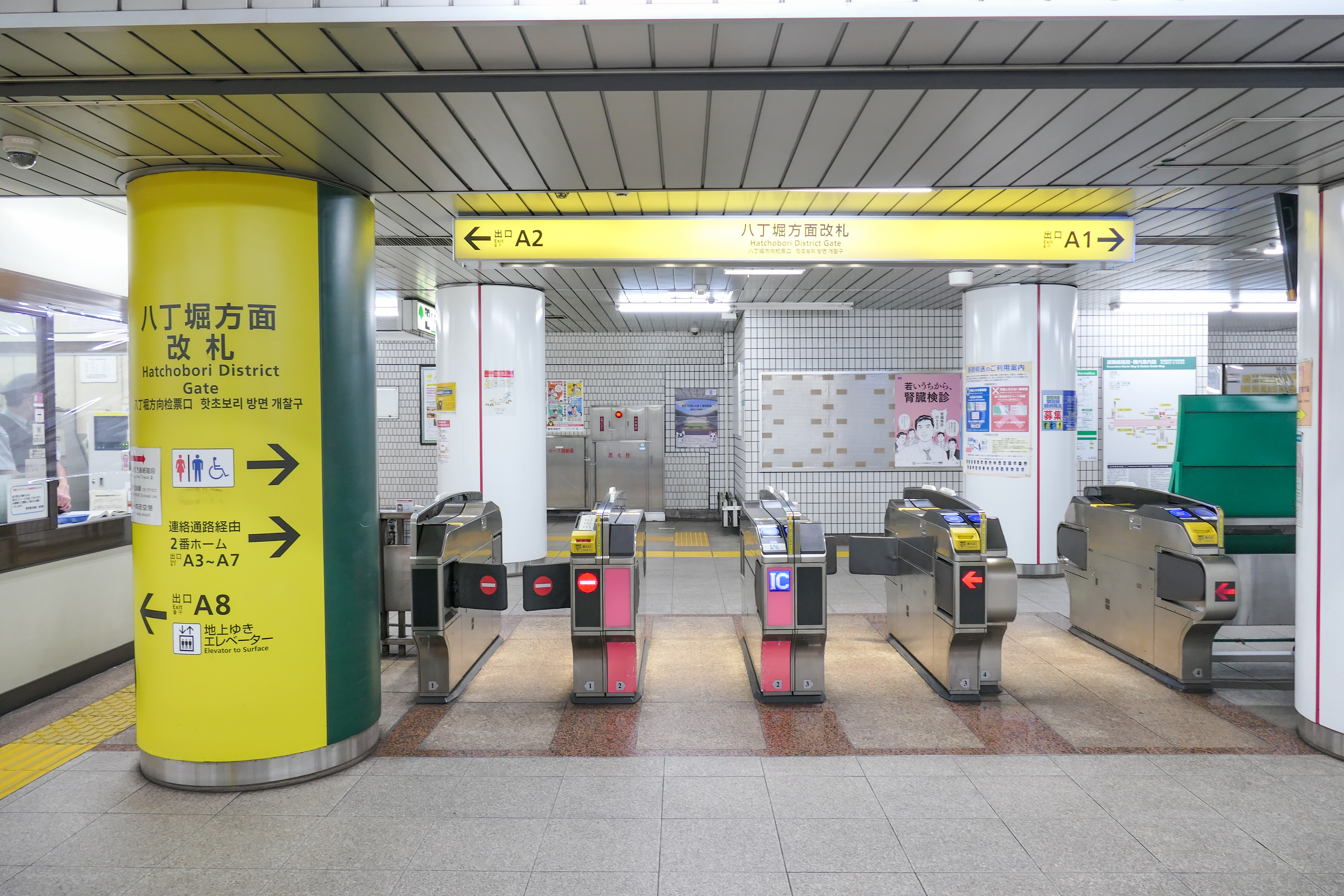
Ticket gate towards Hatchobori in 2022

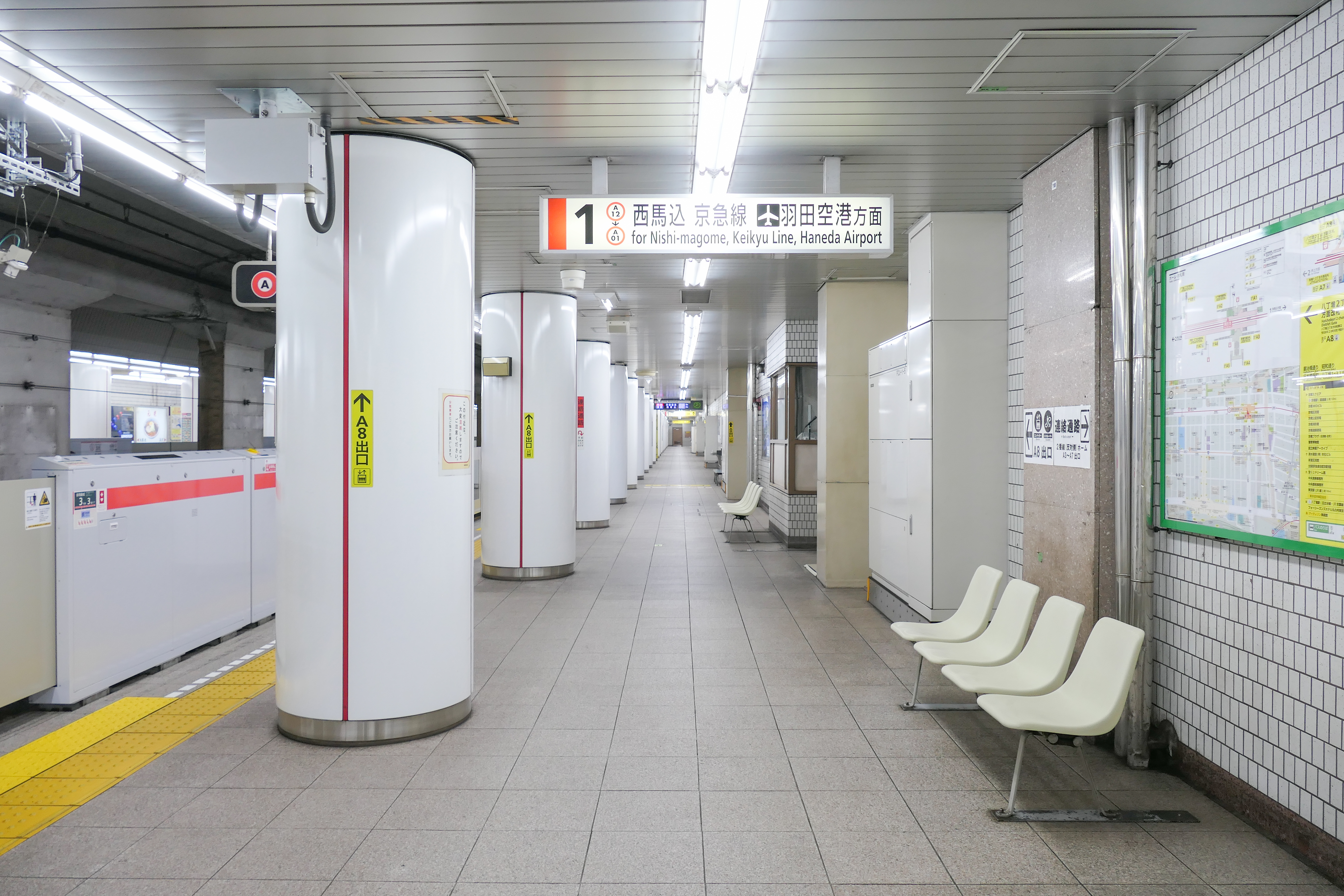
Platform in 2022

== History ==
Takaracho Station opened on February 28, 1963, on what was then called Line 1. The line took its present name in 1978. The station takes its name from Takaracho, a neighborhood that was named in 1931. The neighborhood's name disappeared in 1978 when Takaracho merged with neighboring Kyōbashi, but the station continues to use the old name.

== Surrounding area ==
- Kyōbashi Station ( Tokyo Metro Ginza Line)
- Hatchōbori Station ( Keiyō Line and Tokyo Metro Hibiya Line)
