= Higashi-ginza Station =

Metro station in Tokyo, Japan

Coordinates: 35.6697°N 139.7673°E

Higashi-ginza Station 東銀座駅

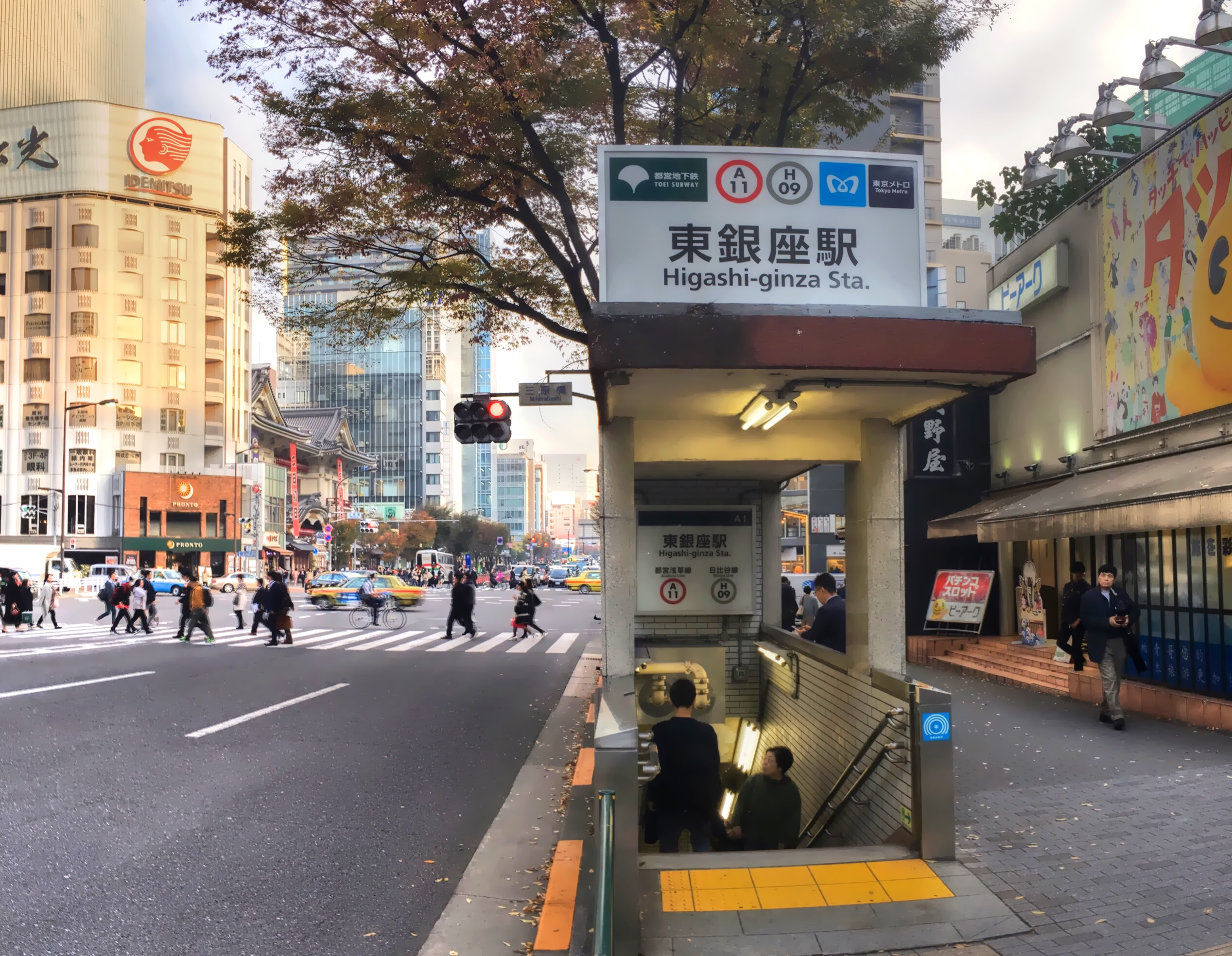
- A1 exit, 2018

General information
- Location: 4-10-10-saki (Asakusa Line); 4-12-15-saki (Hibiya Line); Ginza District, Chūō City, Tokyo; Japan
- Operator: Tokyo Metro; Toei Subway
- Lines: Hibiya Line; Asakusa Line
- Platforms: 1 island platform (Hibiya Line); 2 side platforms (Asakusa Line)
- Tracks: 4 (2 for each line)

Construction
- Structure type: Underground

Other information
- Station code: A-11, H-10

History
- Opened: 28 February 1963; 63 years ago

Passengers
- FY2019: 91,855 daily (Tokyo Metro); 86,726 daily (Toei)

Services
Preceding station	Tokyo Metro	Following station
Ginza towards Naka-meguro	Hibiya Line	Tsukiji towards Kita-Senju
Preceding station	Toei Subway	Following station
Shimbashi towards Nishi-magome	Asakusa Line	Takaracho towards Oshiage
Location
- Location within Tokyo Yamanote Loop Location within Tokyo wards area Location within Japan

Higashi-ginza Station (東銀座駅, Higashi-ginza-eki) is a subway station on the Asakusa Line, operated by the Tokyo Metropolitan Bureau of Transportation (Toei), and on the Hibiya Line operated by Tokyo Metro. The Hibiya Line station is subtitled "Kabukiza-mae". The station is located in Ginza, Chūō, Tokyo, Japan. Its numbers are A-11 and H-10.

== Station layout ==
Higashi-ginza station consists of two stations perpendicular to each other: the Toei and Tokyo Metro stations.

=== Toei station ===
Running underneath Shōwa Street (昭和通り, Shōwa-dori) Higashi-ginza's Asakusa Line station has two platforms serving two tracks. Platform 1 is for passengers bound for Sengakuji and Nishi-magome. Platform 2 is for those traveling in the opposite direction toward Nihombashi and Oshiage.

1	Asakusa Line	for Sengakuji and Nishi-magome; Keikyu Main Line for Shinagawa, Haneda Airport (International Terminal and Domestic Terminal) and Misakiguchi
2	Asakusa Line	for Nihombashi and Oshiage; Keisei Main Line for Aoto, Keisei Funabashi and Narita Airport (Terminal 2·3 and Terminal 1); Hokusō Line for Imba Nihon-idai; Narita Sky Access Line for Narita Airport; Shibayama Railway Line for Shibayama-Chiyoda

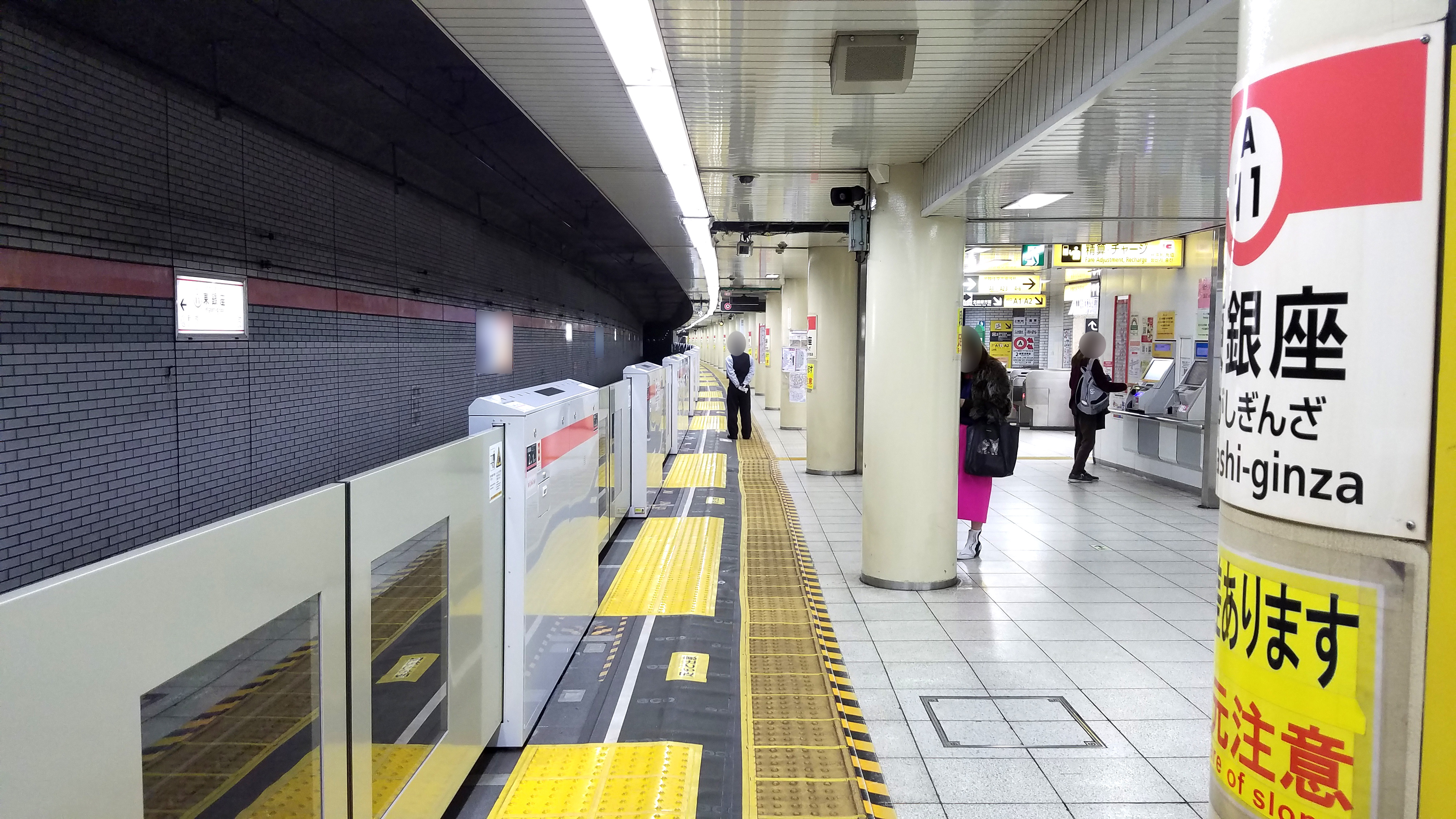
Toei platforms, 2022

=== Tokyo Metro station ===
The Tokyo Metro component of Higashi-ginza station runs below Harumi Street (晴海通り, Harumi-dori). On the Hibiya line, an island station serves the two tracks. Platform 3 is for Ginza and Naka-Meguro Stations, and trains depart Platform 4 for Ueno, Kita-Senju, and Minami-Kurihashi on the Tobu Skytree Line and Tōbu Nikkō Line.

3	Hibiya Line	for Ginza, Roppongi, and Naka-Meguro
4	Hibiya Line	for Ueno, Kita-Senju; Tobu Skytree Line for Tōbu-Dōbutsu-Kōen; Tobu Nikko Line for Minami-Kurihashi

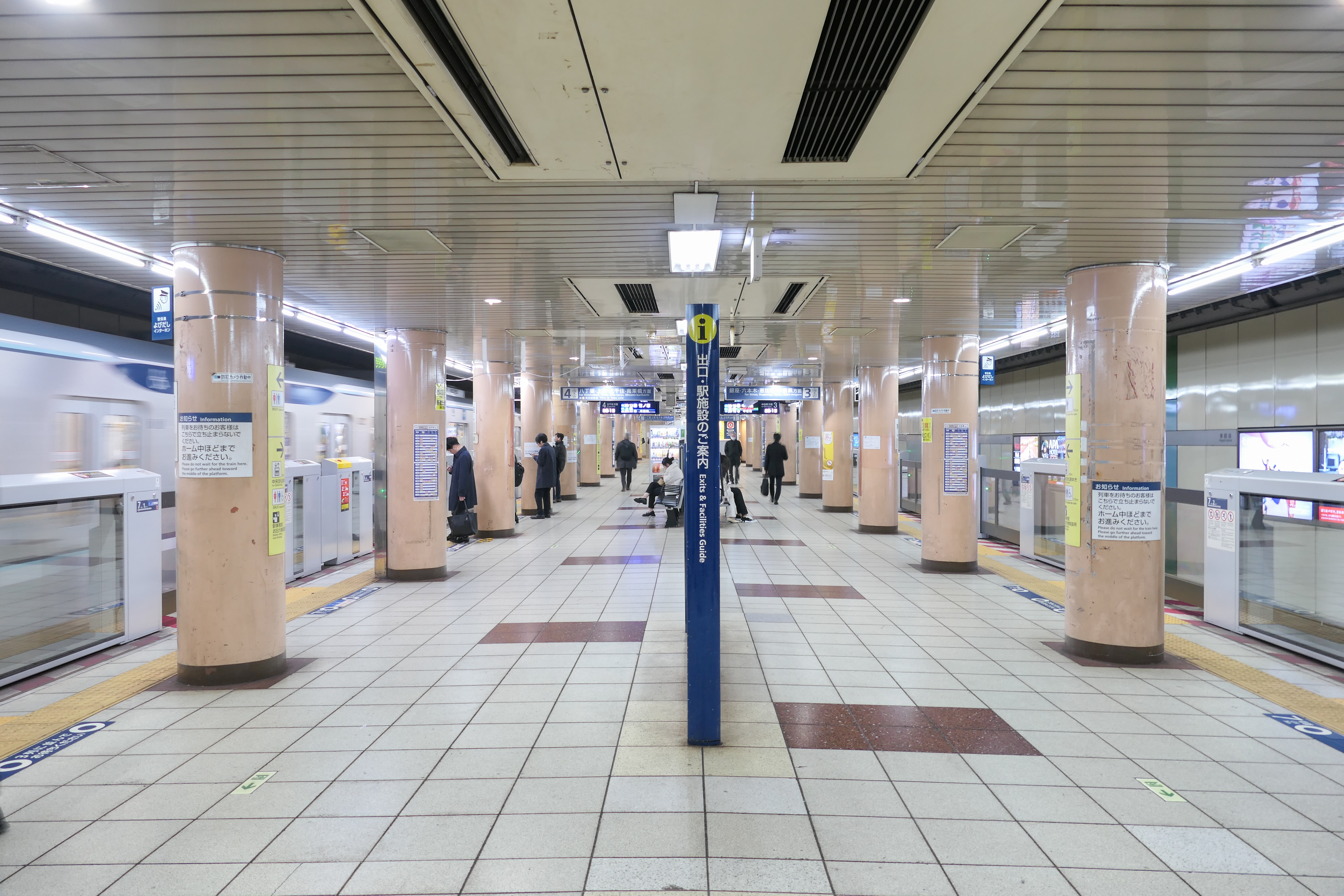
Tokyo Metro platforms, 2023

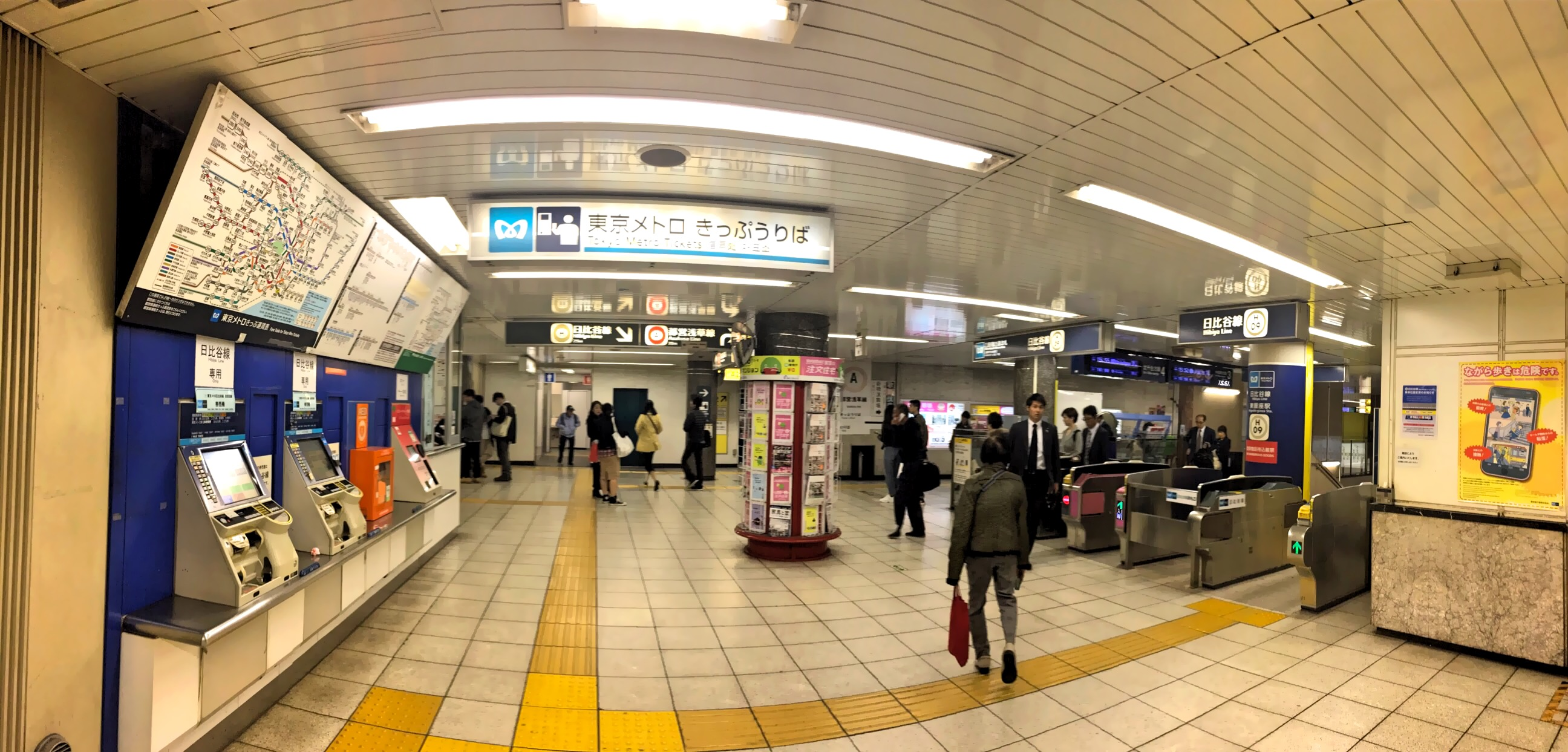
Station ticket gates and ticket machines, 2018.

== History ==
Higashi-ginza Station opened on February 28, 1963, as a station on Toei Line 1 and Hibiya Line. Later in 1978, Toei Line 1 was renamed the Asakusa Line.

The station facilities of the Hibiya Line were inherited by Tokyo Metro after the privatization of the Teito Rapid Transit Authority (TRTA) in 2004.

== Passenger statistics ==
In fiscal 2019, the Tokyo Metro station was used by an average of 91,855 passengers per day, and Toei Station was used by an average of 86,726 passengers per day.

== Surrounding area ==
The station serves the eastern part of the Ginza. In the area are the Kabuki-za, the Shinbashi Enbujō (a theater owned by Shochiku), the Tōgeki (a Shochiku cinema), the Electric Power Development Company, and the Courtyard by Marriott Tokyo Ginza Hotel.
