= Nihombashi Station =

Metro station in Tokyo, Japan

Coordinates: 35°40′55.92″N 139°46′28.48″E

Nihombashi Station 日本橋駅

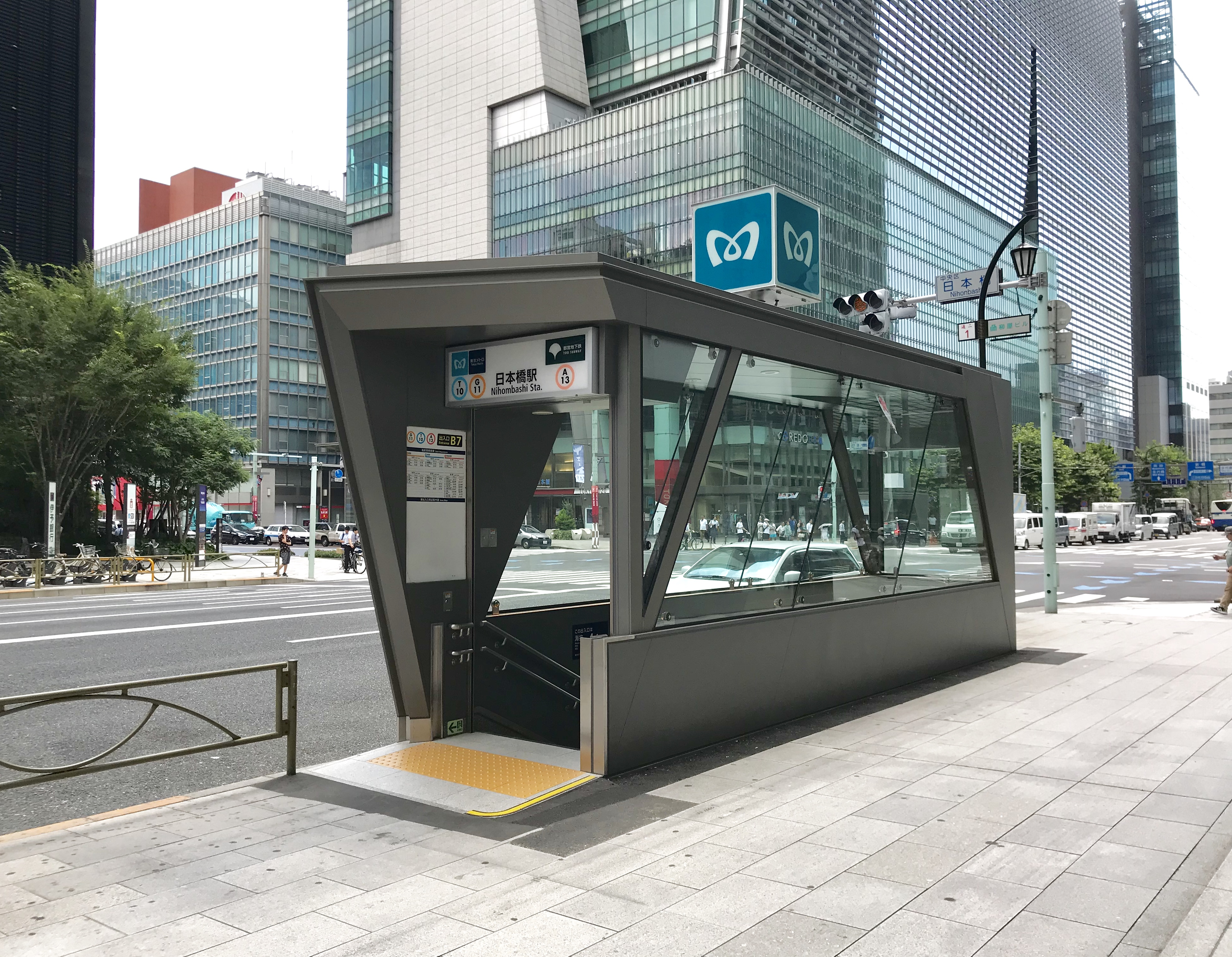
- Exit B7 in August 2019

General information
- Location: 1 Nihonbashi, Chūō-ku, Tokyo; Japan
- System: Tokyo subway
- Owner: Tokyo Metro Co., Ltd. Tokyo Metropolitan Government
- Operator: Tokyo Metro; Toei Subway
- Lines: Ginza Line; Tōzai Line; Asakusa Line
- Platforms: 1 island platform, 1 side platform (Ginza Line); 2 side platforms (Asakusa Line); 1 island platform (Tozai Line)
- Tracks: 6

Construction
- Structure type: Underground

Other information
- Station code: G-11 (Ginza Line); T-10 (Tōzai Line); A-13 (Asakusa Line)

History
- Opened: 24 December 1932; 93 years ago
- Rebuilt: 1963, 1967, 1984
- Former names: Edobashi (Asakusa Line, 1963–1989)

Services
Preceding station	Tokyo Metro	Following station
Ōtemachi towards Nakano	Tōzai Line Rapid Commuter Rapid Local	Kayabachō towards Nishi-Funabashi
Kyōbashi towards Shibuya	Ginza Line	Mitsukoshimae towards Asakusa
Preceding station	Toei Subway	Following station
Shimbashi towards Sengakuji	Asakusa Line Airport Limited Express	Higashi-nihombashi towards Oshiage
Takaracho towards Nishi-magome	Asakusa Line	Ningyōchō towards Oshiage
Location
- Location within Tokyo wards area Location within Kanto Area Location within Japan

Nihombashi Station (日本橋駅, Nihonbashi-eki) is a subway station in the Nihonbashi district of Tokyo, Japan, jointly operated by Tokyo Metropolitan Bureau of Transportation (Toei) and Tokyo Metro.

== History ==
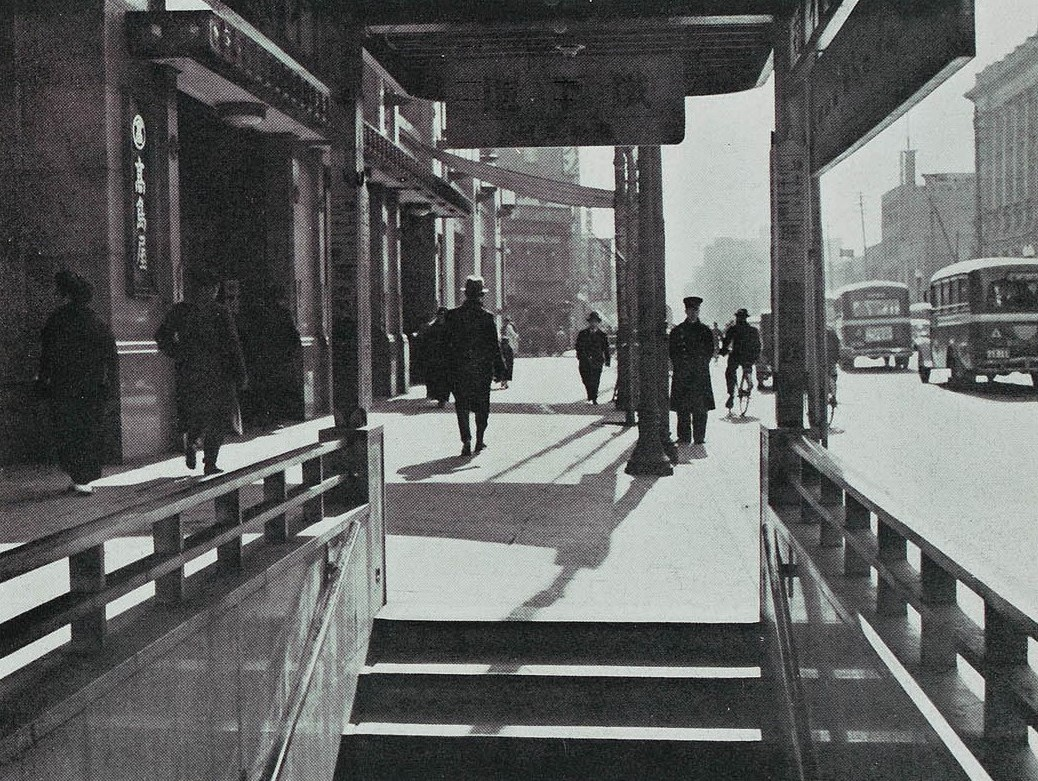
Exit of Nihombashi Station in the 1930s, with Nihombashi Takashimaya visible.

The Tokyo Underground Railway (which built the Asakusa-Shimbashi section of the Ginza Line) opened a station here on 24 December 1932, when they extended the line south to Kyōbashi. On 1 September 1941, they merged with the Tokyo Rapid Railway to form the Teito Rapid Transit Authority (TRTA).

The next development was the opening of Edobashi Station on February 28, 1963, when Toei Line 1 was extended to Higashi-ginza. Transfer was allowed between the two lines here, but the complex only became a true interchange when the Tōzai Line station opened on 14 September 1967.

Toei Line 1 received its name—the Asakusa Line—on 1 July 1978, and Edobashi Station was renamed on 19 March 1989, to avoid confusion with Edogawabashi Station on the Yūrakuchō Line, which opened in 1974.

The station facilities of the Ginza and Tozai lines were inherited by Tokyo Metro after the privatization of the Teito Rapid Transit Authority (TRTA) in 2004.

== Lines ==
Nihombashi Station is served by the following lines.

- Toei Asakusa Line (second basement)
- Tokyo Metro Ginza Line (second basement)
- Tokyo Metro Tōzai Line (third basement)

== Station layout ==
The Ginza Line station originally opened as an island platform serving two tracks, but overcrowding prompted the construction of a side platform serving Shibuya-bound trains in 1984. The island platform currently serves only Asakusa-bound trains, and the Shibuya side of the platform is fenced off.

The Tōzai Line station consists of an island platform serving two tracks, while the Asakusa Line station consists of two side platforms with two tracks between them. At the Asakusa line station, passengers must choose their direction before passing through the ticket gates.

=== Tokyo Metro platforms ===
1	Ginza Line	for Akasaka-mitsuke and Shibuya
2	Ginza Line	for Ueno and Asakusa
3	Tōzai Line	for Urayasu and Nishi-funabashi; Sōbu Line (Local) for Tsudanuma; Tōyō Rapid Railway Line for Tōyō-Katsutadai
4	Tōzai Line	for Ōtemachi, Takadanobaba and Nakano; Chūō Line (Local) for Mitaka

The Japanese folk song "Oedo Nihonbashi" (お江戸日本橋, Oedo Nihonbashi) is used as the departure melody for the Tōzai Line platforms in 2015 and the Ginza Line platforms in 2018.

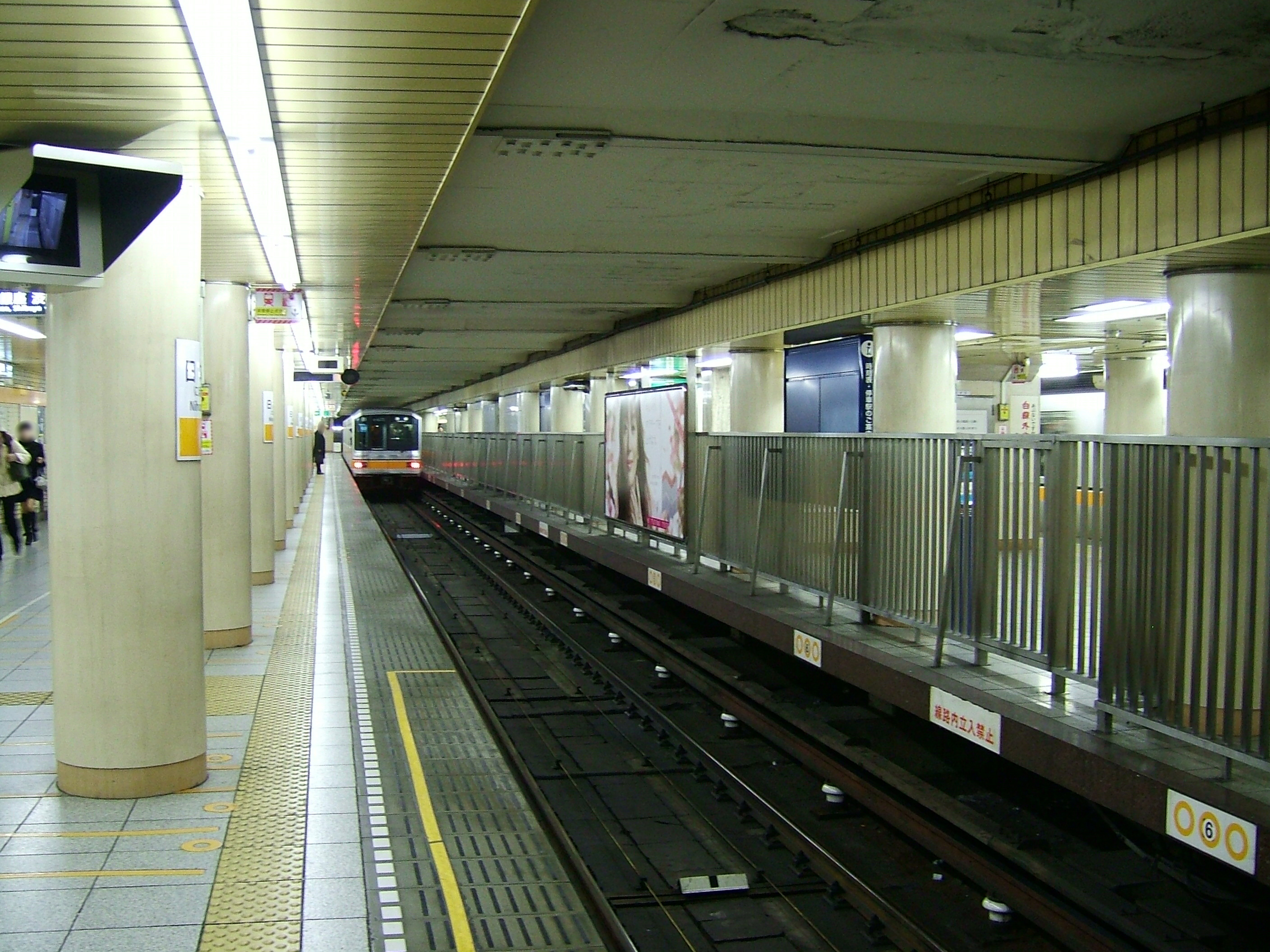
Ginza Line platforms, 2006

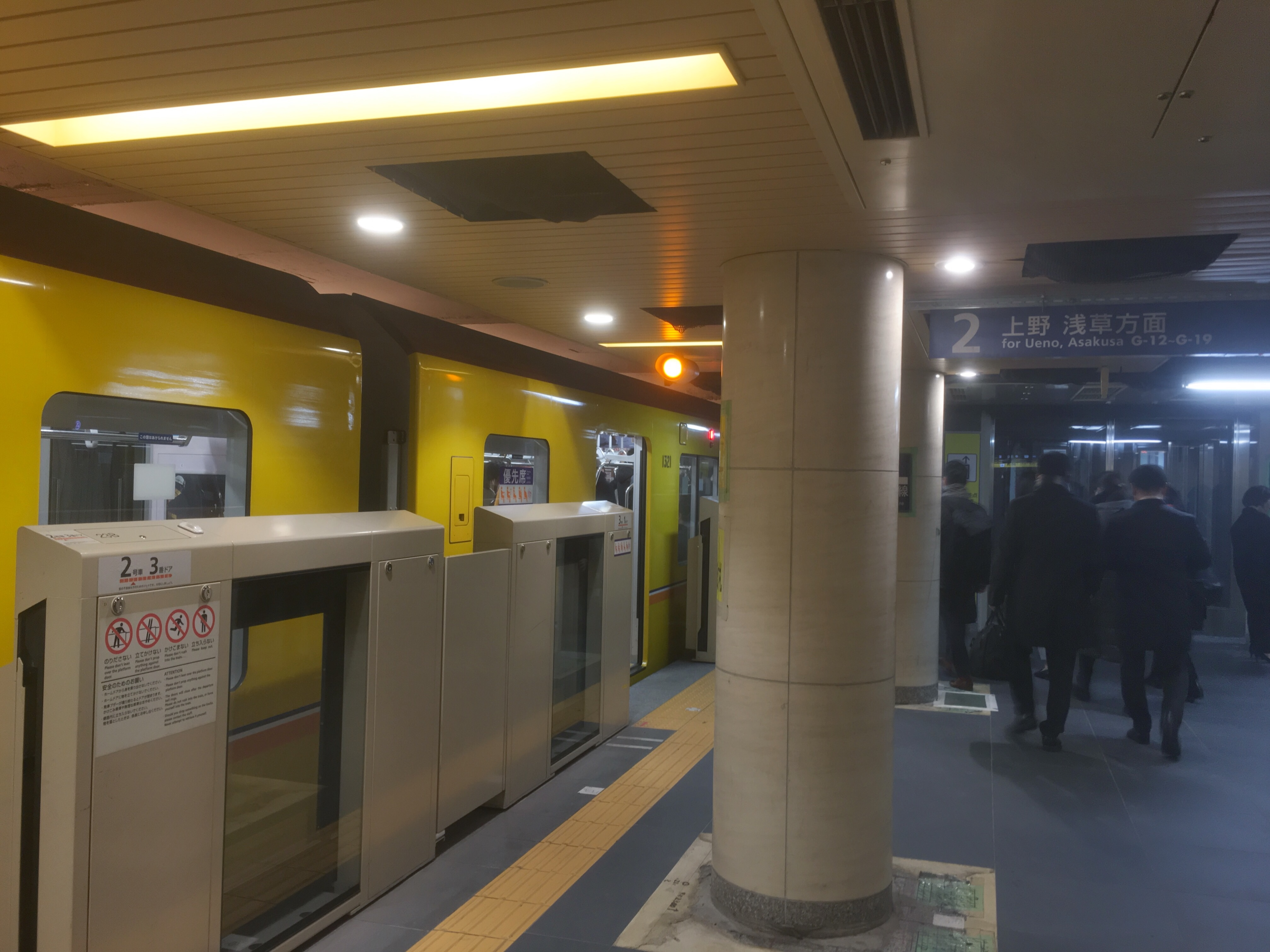
Ginza Line platforms, February 2020

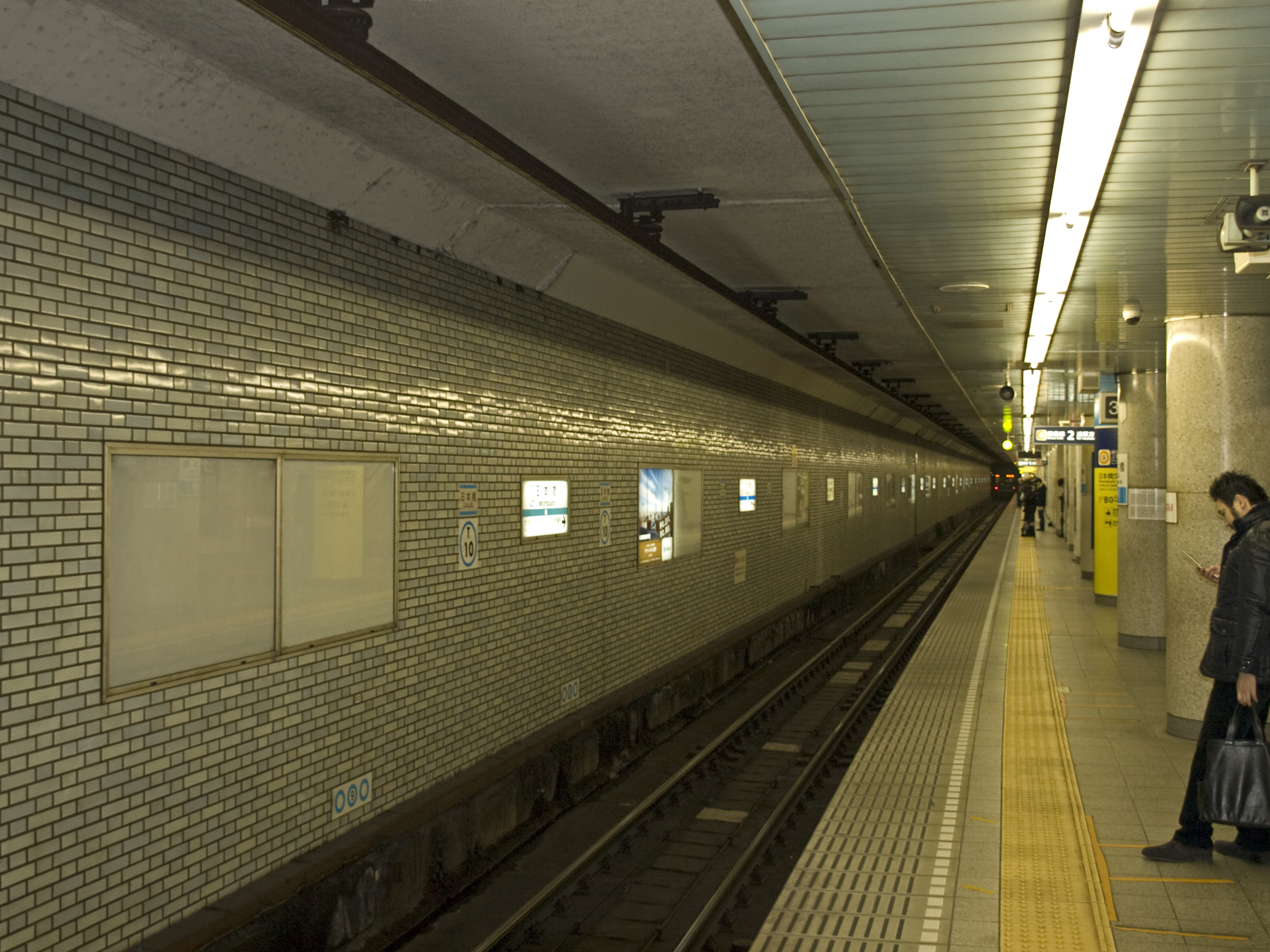
Tozai Line platforms, March 2013

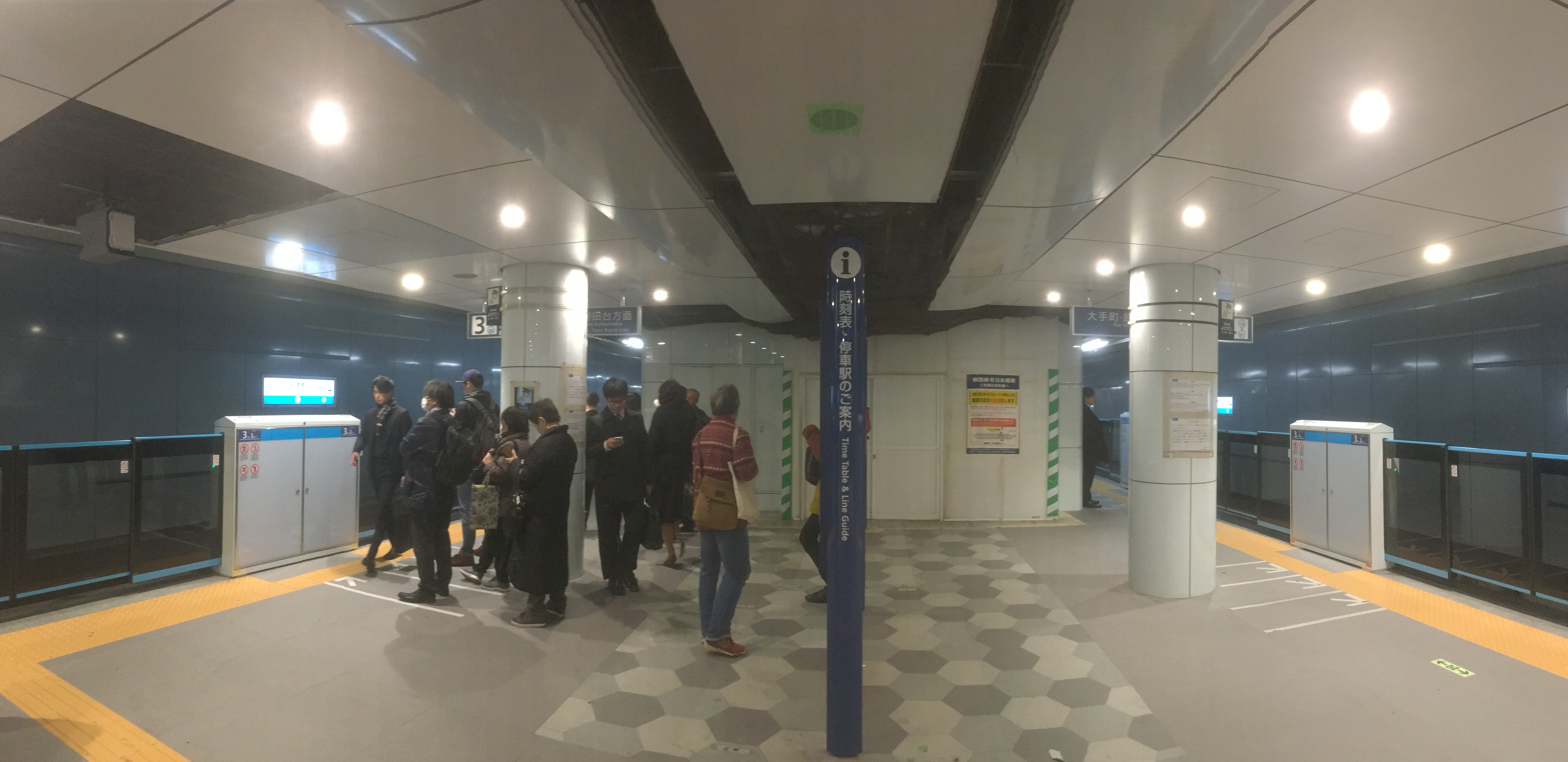
Tozai Line platforms, February 2020

=== Toei Subway platforms ===
1	Asakusa Line	for Sengakuji and Nishi-magome; Keikyū Main Line for Shinagawa, Haneda Airport (International Terminal and Domestic Terminal), Yokohama and Misakiguchi
2	Asakusa Line	for Oshiage; Keisei Main Line for Aoto, Keisei Narita and Narita Airport (Terminal 2·3 and Terminal 1); Narita Sky Access Line for Narita Airport; Hokusō Line for Inba-Nihon-Idai; Shibayama Railway Line for Shibayama-Chiyoda

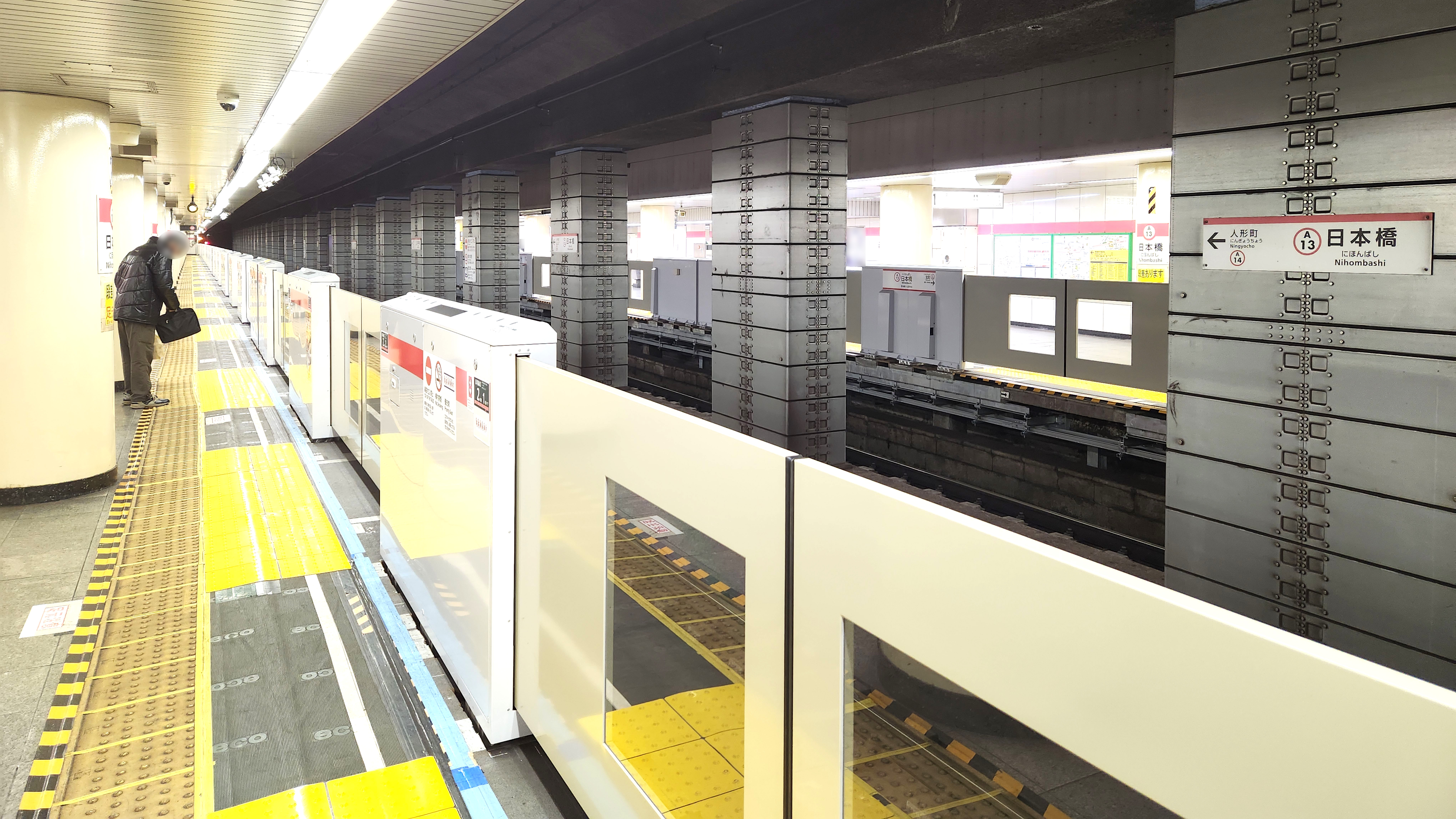
Asakusa Line platforms in December 2022

== See also ==
- List of railway stations in Japan
