= Toei 5300 series =

Japanese electric multiple unit train type

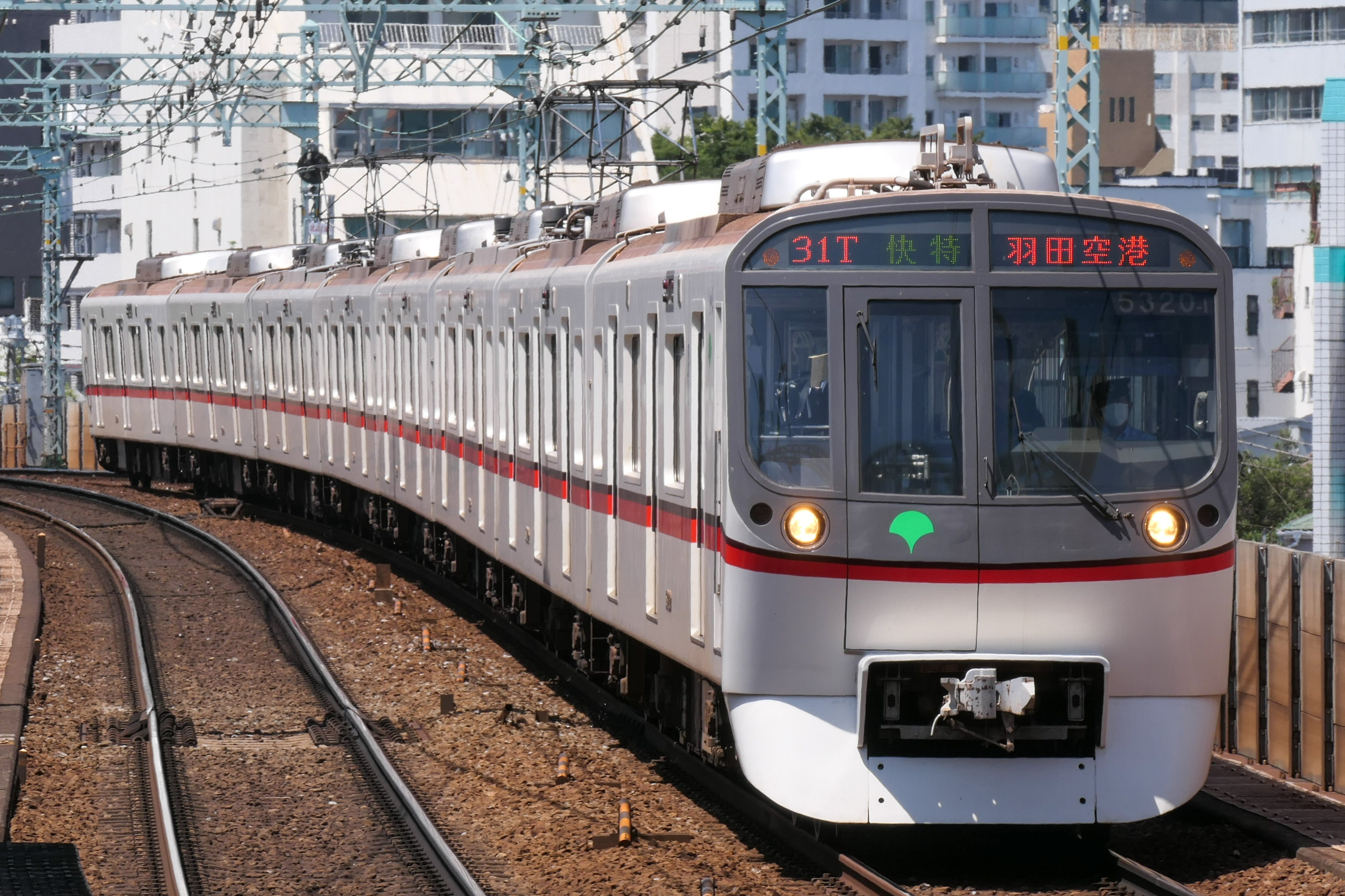
- A Toei 5300 series train in July 2021
- In service: 1991–2023
- Manufacturers: Kawasaki Heavy Industries, Nippon Sharyo, Kinki Sharyo, Hitachi
- Replaced: Toei 5000 series
- Constructed: 1990–1998
- Entered service: 31 March 1991
- Scrapped: 2018–
- Number built: 216 vehicles (27 sets)
- Number in service: None
- Number scrapped: 208 vehicles (26 sets)
- Successor: Toei 5500 series
- Formation: 8 cars per trainset
- Fleet numbers: 5301–5327
- Operator: Tokyo Metropolitan Bureau of Transportation
- Depot: Magome
- Lines served: Toei Asakusa Line; Keisei Main Line; Keisei Oshiage Line; Keisei Higashi-Narita Line; Hokuso Line; Shibayama Railway Line; Keikyu Main Line; Keikyu Airport Line; Keikyu Kurihama Line; Keikyu Zushi Line

Specifications
- Car body construction: Aluminium
- Car length: 18 m (59 ft 1 in)
- Width: 2.78 m (9 ft 1 in)
- Height: 4.05 m (13 ft 3 in) (pantograph raised); 3.6 m (11 ft 10 in) (pantograph lowered)
- Doors: 3 pairs per side
- Maximum speed: 5327: 120 km/h (75 mph); Remainder: 110 km/h (68 mph)
- Weight: 242 t (238 long tons; 267 short tons)
- Traction system: GTO–VVVF (Mitsubishi Electric)
- Traction motors: 4 × 165 kW (221 hp) or 180 kW (240 hp) (Note: 5327 only) 3-phase AC induction motor (Mitsubishi Electric)
- Power output: 2.64 MW (3,540 hp) or 2.88 MW (3,860 hp)
- Transmission: Westinghouse-Natal Drive, Gear ratio: 6.0625
- Acceleration: 0.92 m/s^{2} (2.1 mph/s)
- Deceleration: 1.1 m/s^{2} (2.5 mph/s) (service); 1.3 m/s^{2} (2.9 mph/s) (emergency)
- Electric systems: 1,500 V DC overhead catenary
- Current collection: Pantograph
- Bogies: KD302, KD302A
- Braking systems: Electronically controlled pneumatic brakes, regenerative braking
- Safety system: C-ATS
- Coupling system: Janney coupler
- Track gauge: 1,435 mm (4 ft 8 1/2 in) standard gauge

The Toei 5300 series (都営5300形, Toei 5300-gata) was an electric multiple unit (EMU) train type operated by Tokyo Metropolitan Bureau of Transportation (Toei) on the Toei Asakusa Line and associated through services in Tokyo, Japan. A total of 27 eight-car trainsets (216 vehicles) were built between 1990 and 1998 by Kawasaki Heavy Industries, Nippon Sharyo, Kinki Sharyo, and Hitachi.

The train type was introduced into service on 31 March 1991 following the introduction of Hokuso Kodan Line through services, and to replace the 5000 series trainsets that had been used on the Asakusa Line since its inception in 1960. The 5300 series was withdrawn between 2018 and February 2023 following the introduction of new 5500 series trainsets.

== Formation ==
The fleet consisted of 27 eight-car trainsets formed as follows, with four motored ("M") cars and four non-powered trailer ("T") cars, and car 1 at the south end.

Car No.	1	2	3	4	5	6	7	8
Designation	M1c	T1	M1	T2	T3	M2	T4	M2c
Numbering	53xx-1	53xx-2	53xx-3	53xx-4	53xx-5	53xx-6	53xx-7	53xx-8

- Cars 3 and 6 each had two lozenge-type pantographs.
- Car 3 was designated as a "mildly air-conditioned" car.

== Interior ==
Passenger accommodation consisted of longitudinal bucket seating throughout. LED passenger information displays were provided above each passenger door. The sets were initially built with illuminated route maps above the doors, but these were eventually replaced with conventional route maps.

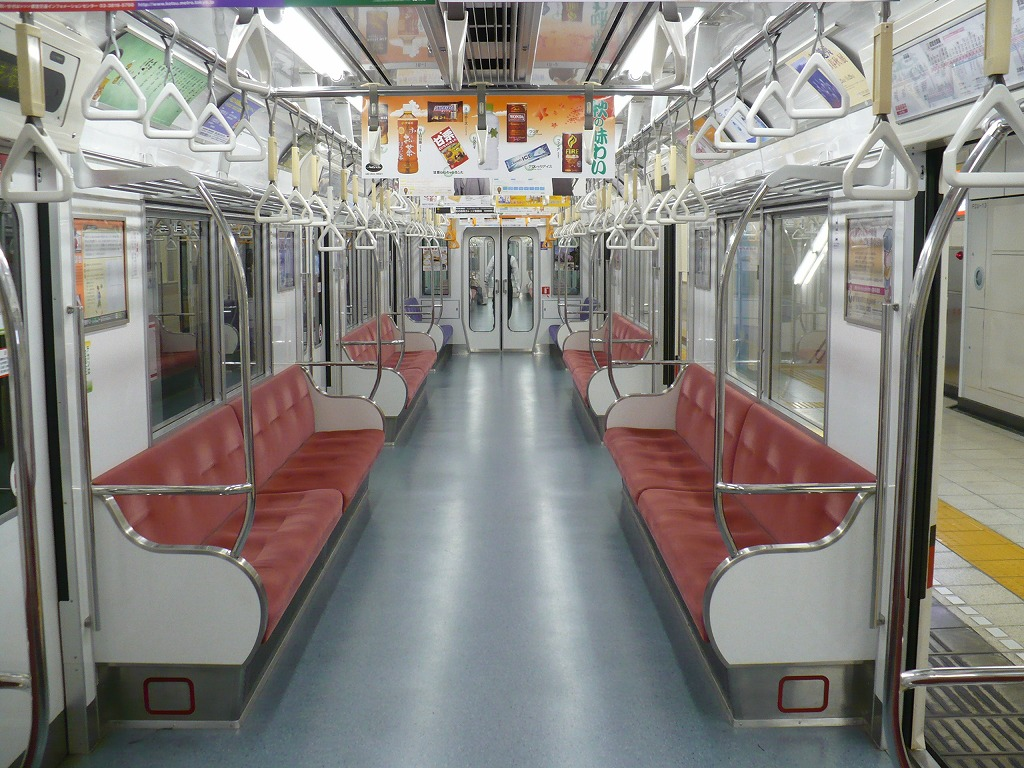
Interior

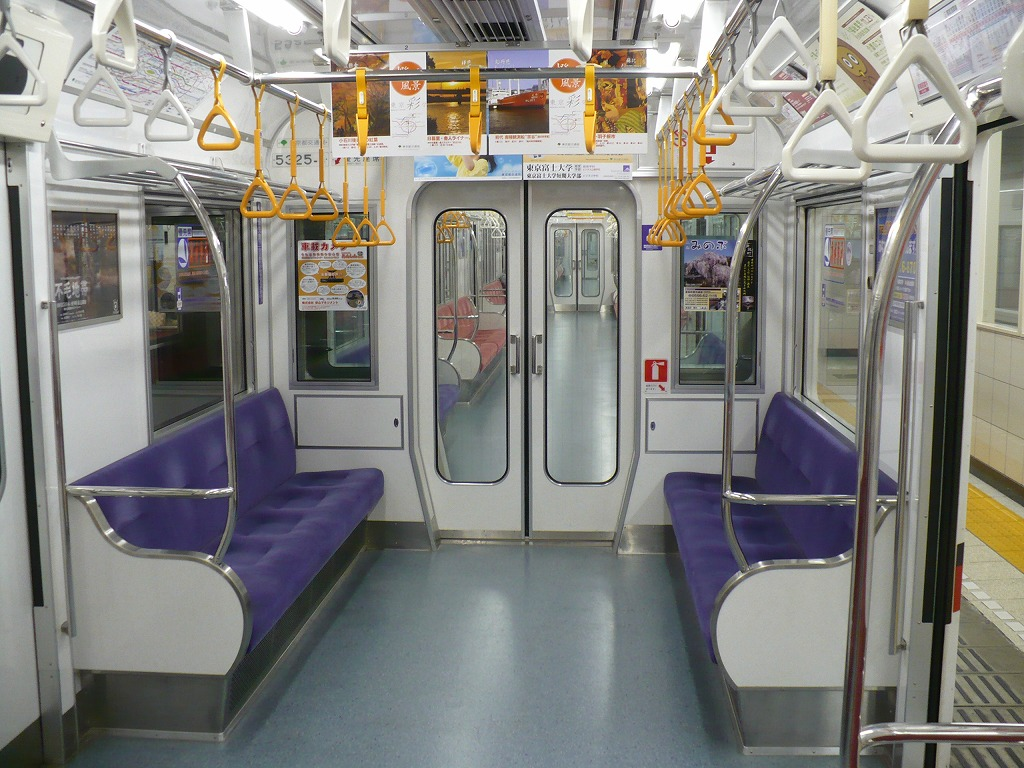
Priority seating

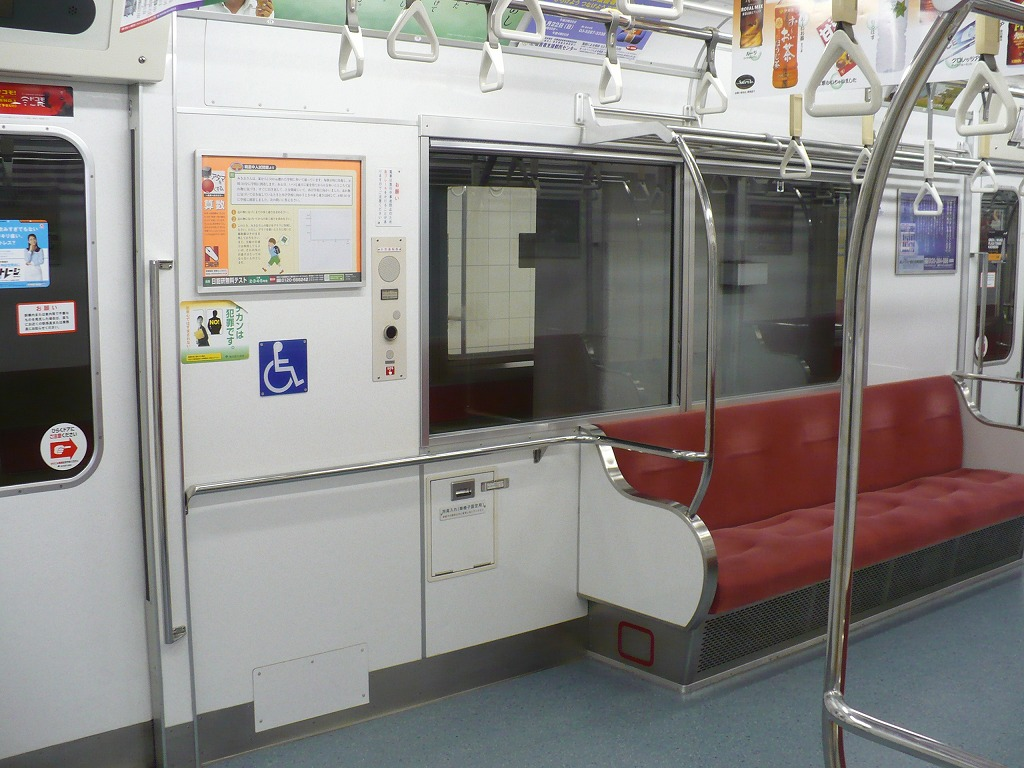
Wheelchair space

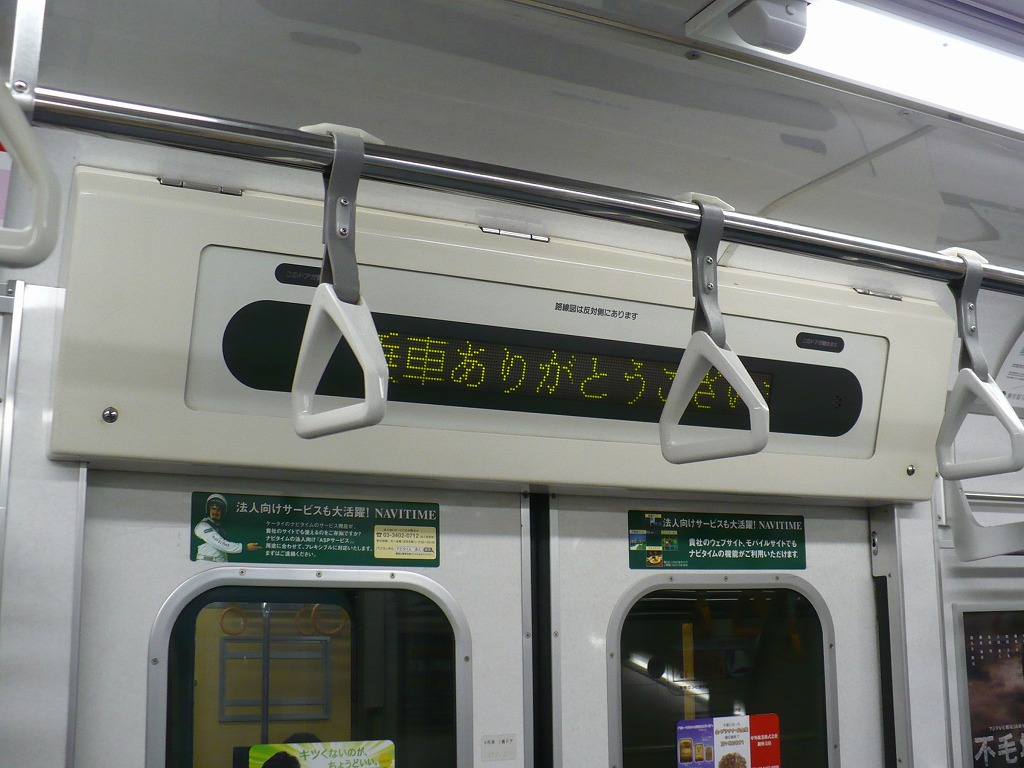
Above-door LED information display

== History ==
The 5300 series was introduced on 31 March 1991 to fulfill capacity requirements brought on by the commencement of Hokuso Kodan Line (now known as the Hokuso Line) through services onto the Asakusa Line, and to replace the ageing Toei 5000 series trains which had been used on the line since its opening in 1960. Sets built from 1994 onwards (5315 onward) featured a lengthened front-end skirt.

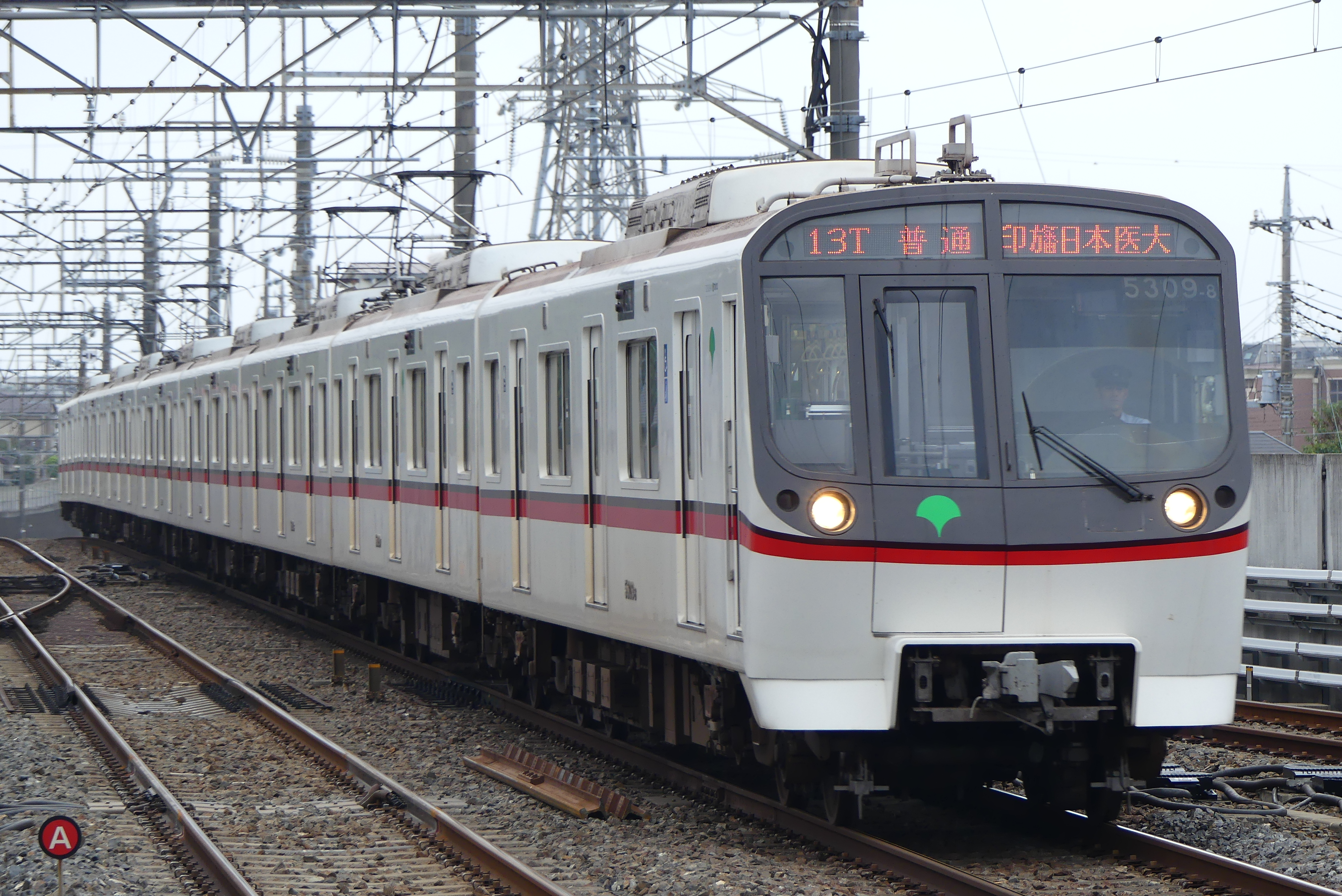
Original front-end styling

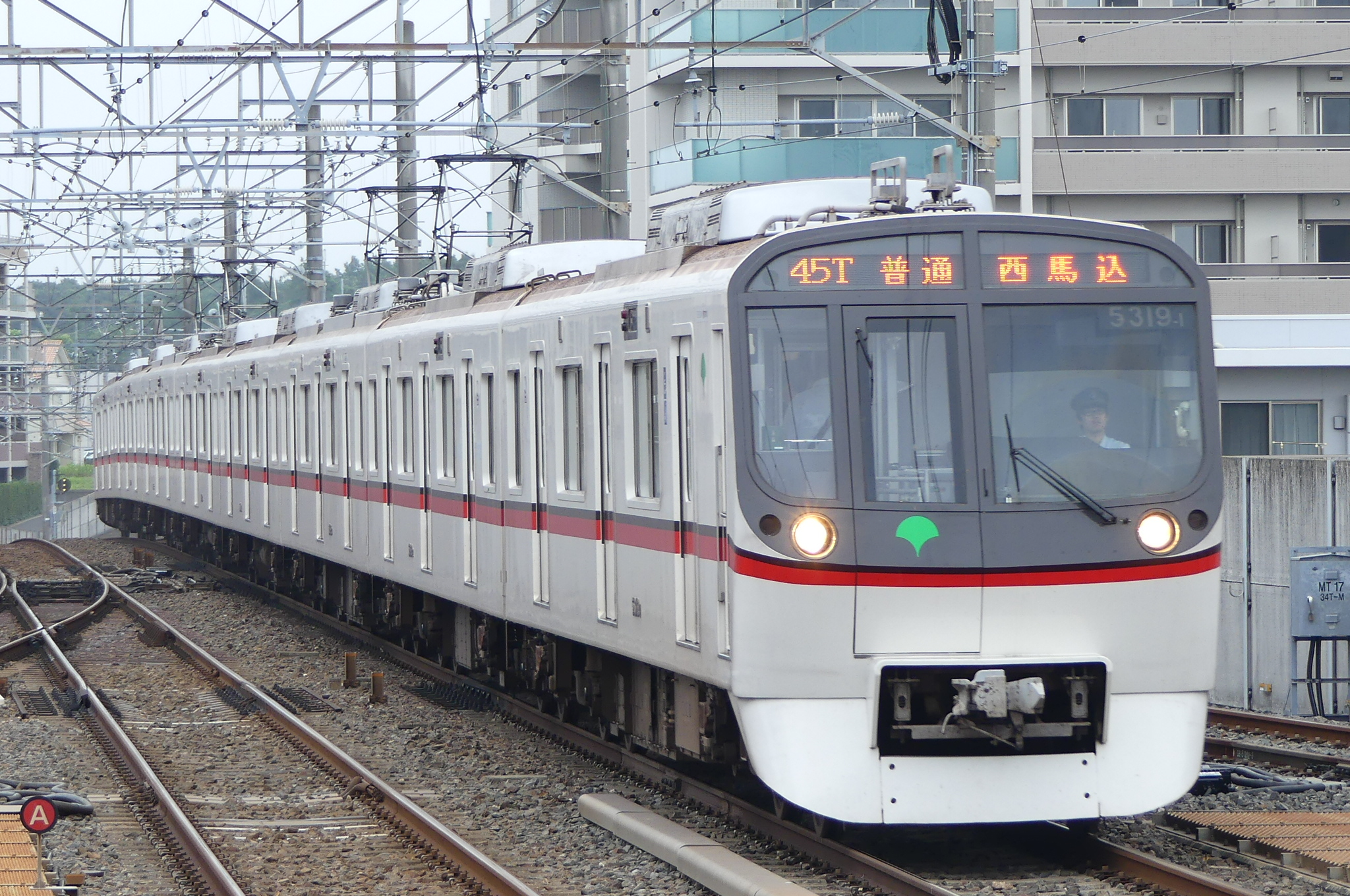
Later front-end styling

After the speed limit of the Keikyu Line was raised to allow for 120-kilometre-per-hour (75 mph) operation between Shinagawa and Yokohama stations in 1995, a 5300 series set (5327) entered service in 1998 with uprated traction motors (to 180 kW or 240 hp) to support such operation. Plans existed to modify the rest of the fleet accordingly, but they never came to fruition.

=== Retirement ===
Following the introduction of new Toei 5500 series trainsets, withdrawals commenced on 27 July 2018, with set 5301 being the first to be withdrawn; it was scrapped on 1 August of that year. Set 5320, the last trainset in operation, made its final trip in revenue service in February 2023.

== Gallery ==
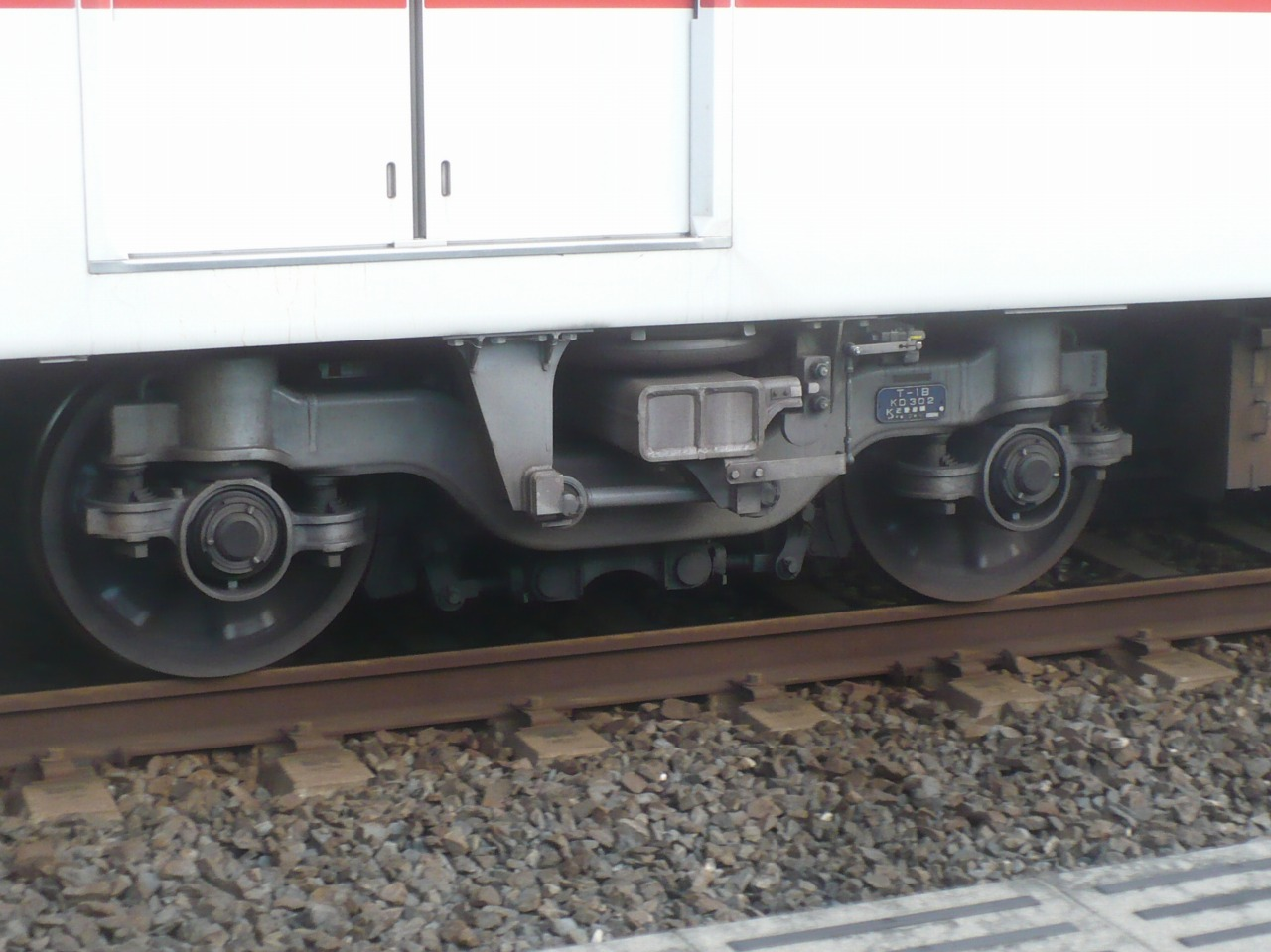
Bogie of a 5300 series

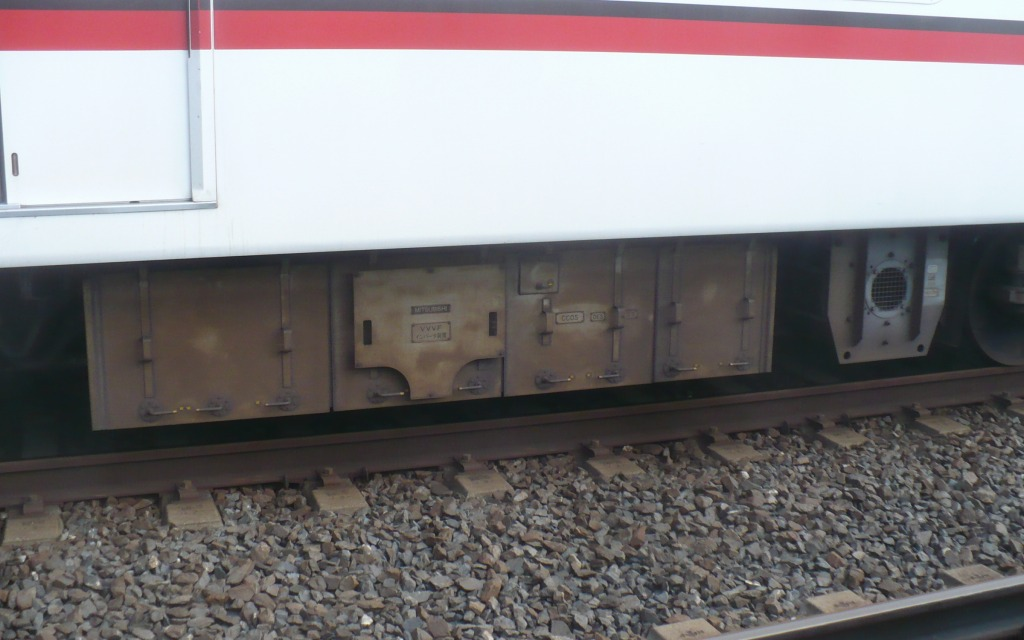
VVVF inverter as used on the 5300 series

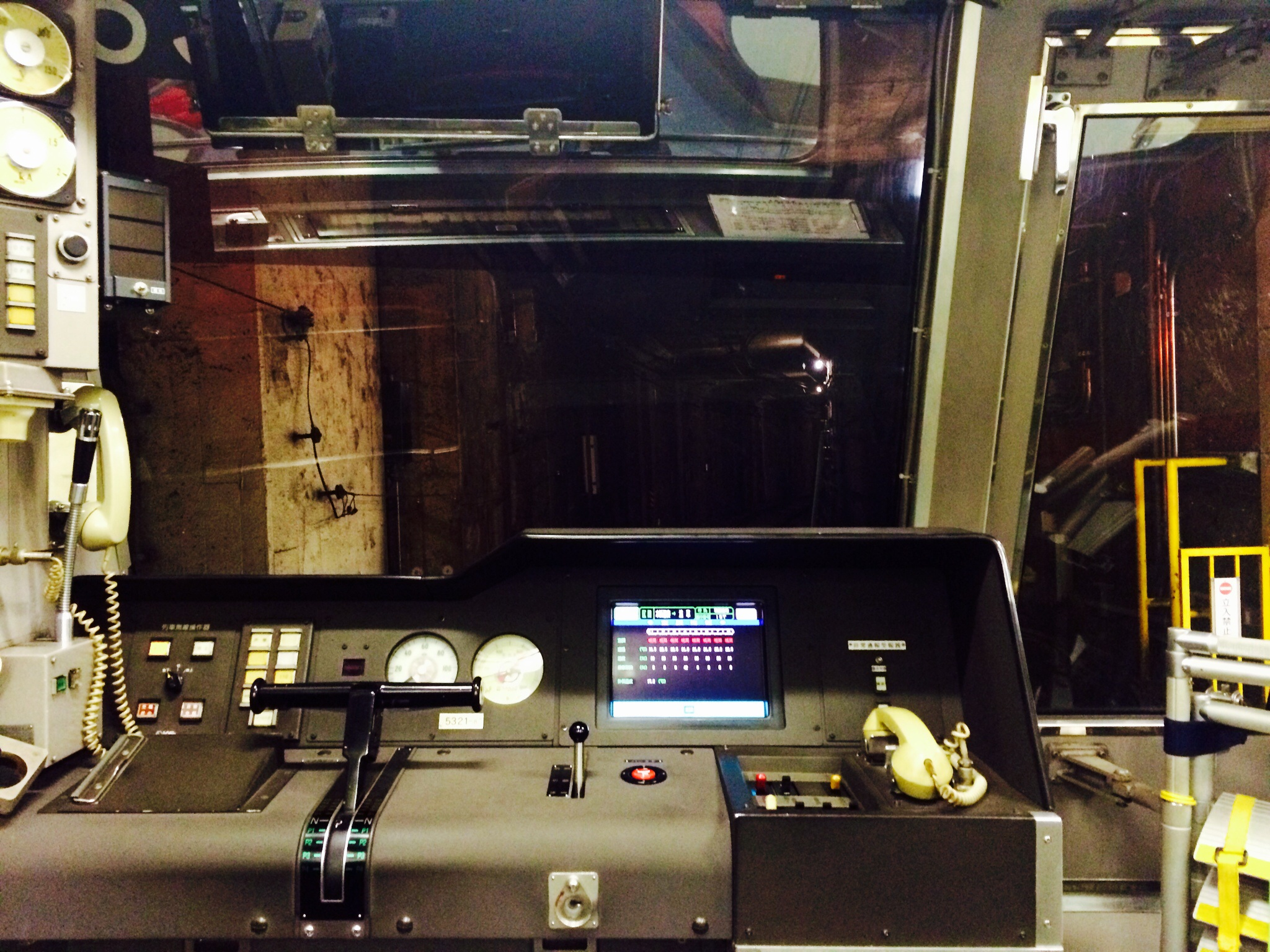
Driver's cab of the 5300 series

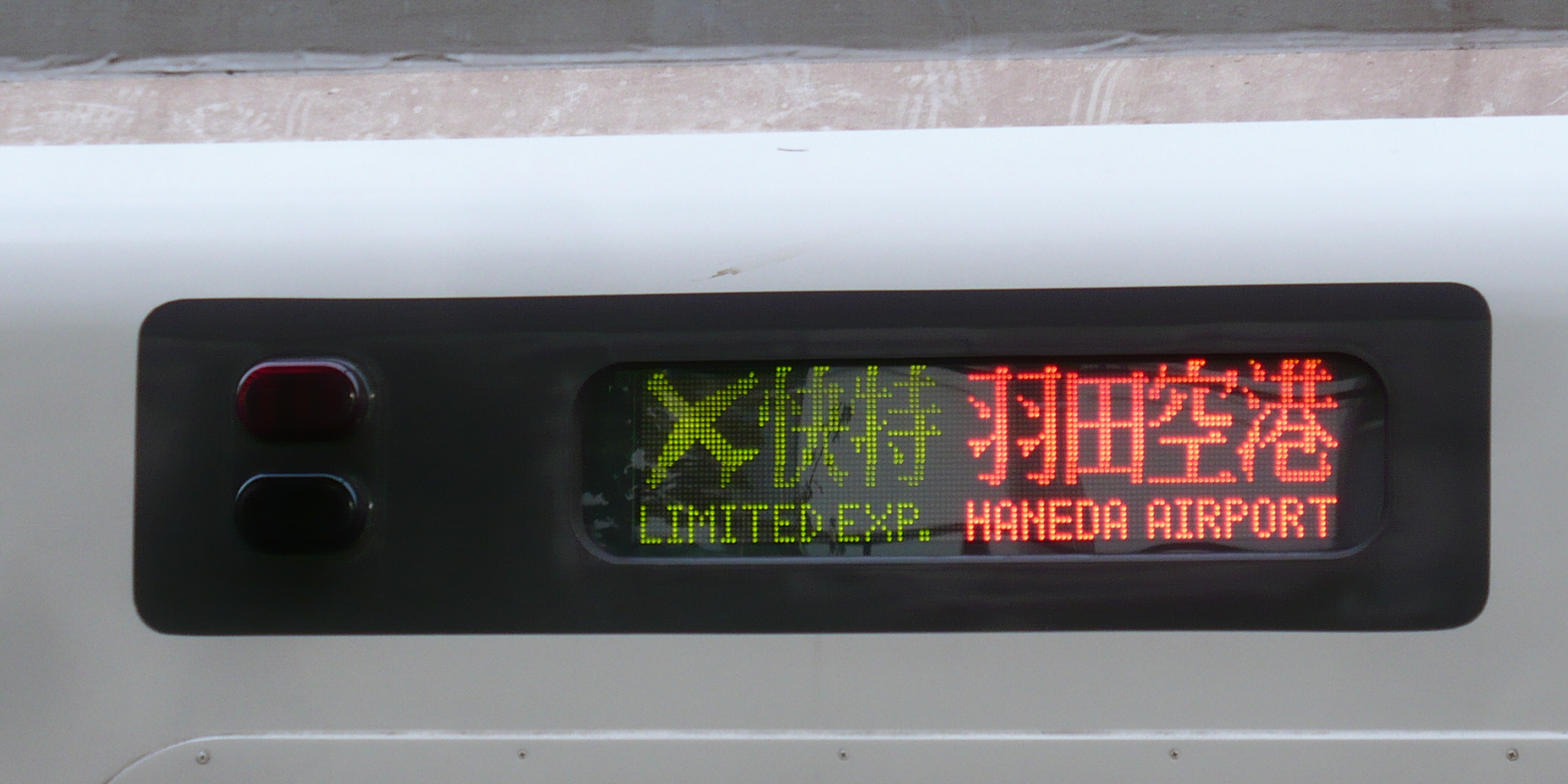
LED display depicting a 5300 series on an Airport Limited Express service to Haneda Airport

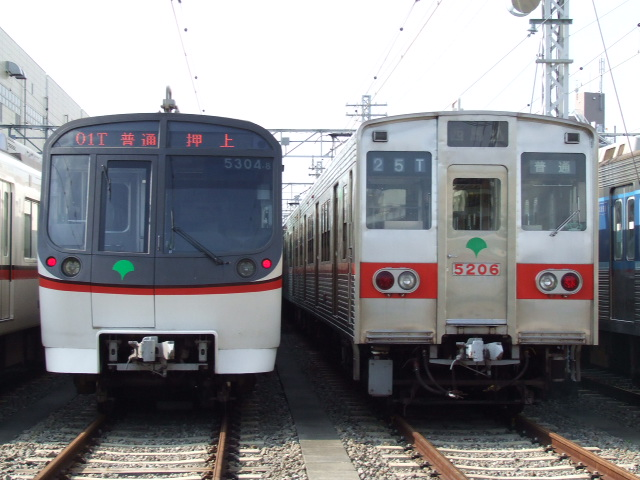
An early batch Toei 5300 series and an older Toei 5200 series. The 5200 series was retired in 2006.

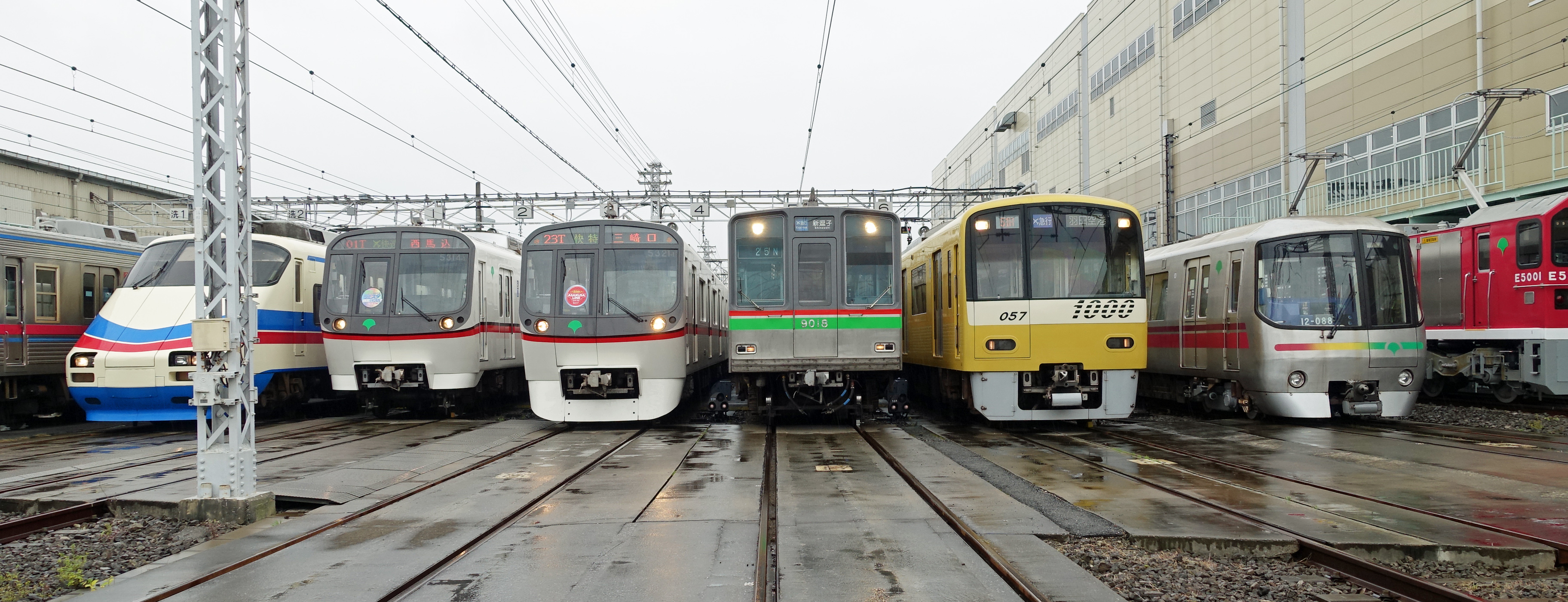
Two 5300 series EMUs at Magome Depot during the 2015 Toei Festival. The trains here are (from left) a Keisei AE100 series, two 5300 series, a Chiba New Town Railway 9000 series, a Keikyu N1000 series and a Toei 12-000 series.
