= 9800 series =

9800 series may refer to:

- Chiba New Town Railway 9800 series, a Japanese train type
- HP 9800 series
- PC-9800 series
