= Hokuso 7300 series =

Japanese electric multiple unit train type

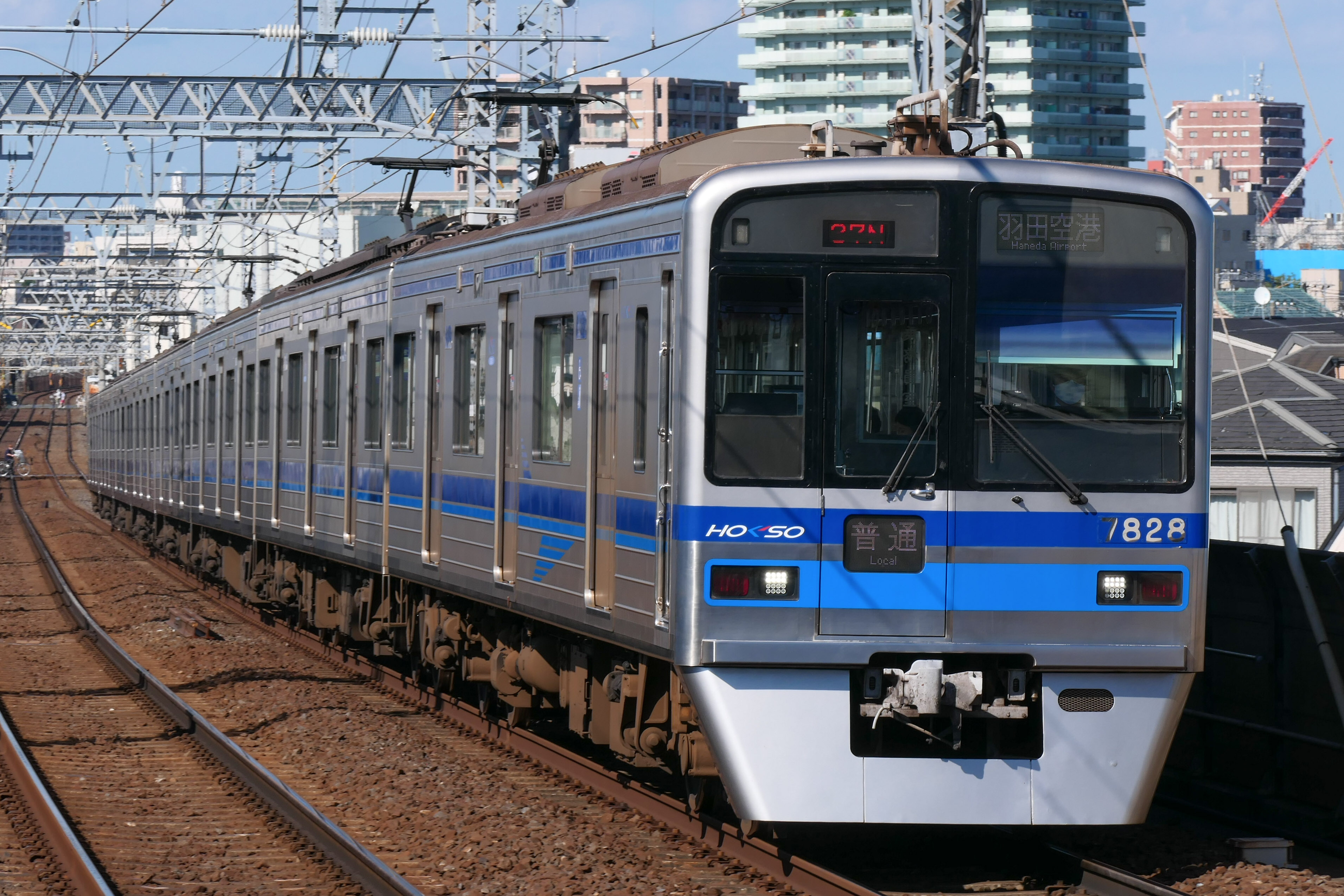
- Set 7828 in July 2021
- Entered service: 1992
- Number built: 48 vehicles (6 sets)
- Number in service: 40 vehicles (5 sets)
- Formation: 8 cars per trainset
- Fleet numbers: 7308–7318, 7808–7838
- Operator: Hokuso Railway
- Lines served: Hokuso Line; Keisei Main Line; Keisei Oshiage Line; Toei Asakusa Line; Keikyu Main Line; Keikyu Airport Line

Specifications
- Car body construction: Stainless steel
- Car length: 18 m (59 ft 1 in)
- Doors: 3 pairs per side
- Maximum speed: 120 km/h (75 mph)
- Power supply: 1,500 V
- Current collection: Overhead catenary
- Safety system: C-ATS
- Track gauge: 1,435 mm (4 ft 8 1/2 in)

The Hokuso 7300 series (北総鉄道7300形) is an electric multiple unit (EMU) commuter train type operated by the Hokuso Railway on the Hokuso Line in Japan since 1992.

== Design ==
Based on the Keisei 3700 series design, two eight-car sets were introduced in 1992. Four further sets, numbered 7808–7838, were added from 2003, modified from former Keisei 3700 series sets.

== Formation ==
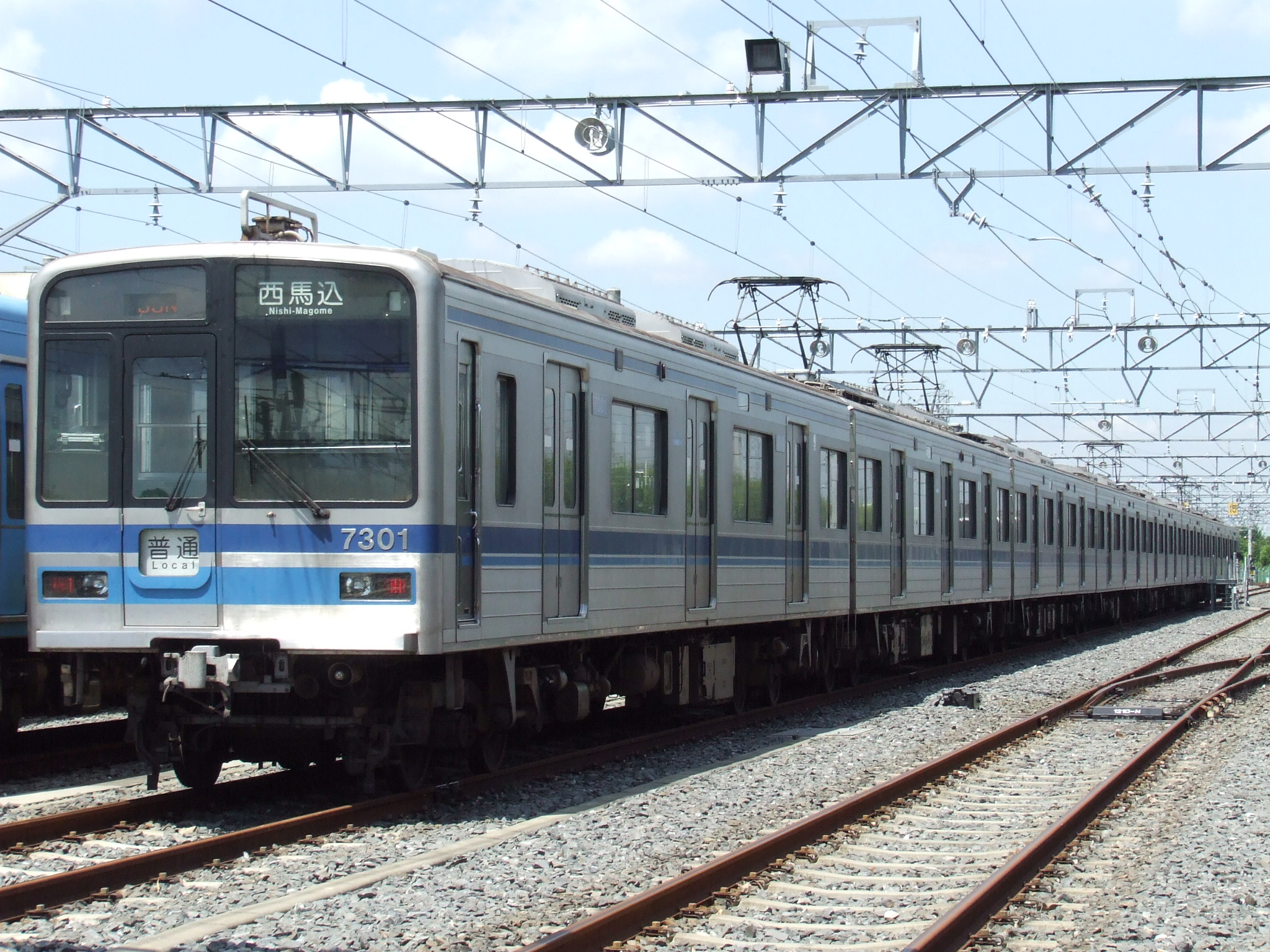
7300 series set 7308 in August 2007

As of 3 March 2022, the fleet consists of two eight-car 7300 series sets and three eight-car 7800 series sets formed as shown below, with six motored (M) cars and two trailer (T) cars, and car 1 at the southern end.

Car No.	1	2	3	4	5	6	7	8
Designation	M2c	M1	T	M1'	M2	T	M1	M2c
Numbering	73x8	73x7	73x6	73x5	73x4	73x3	73x2	73x1

The 7800 series set cars are numbered in the "78xx" series. The two M1 cars each have two single-arm pantographs, and the M1' car has one.

== Former identities ==
The 7800 series sets were formerly numbered as follows.

Set No.	Former Keisei set No.	Notes
7808	3808	
7818	3748	Transferred back to Keisei in December 2021; two cars removed
7828	3778	
7838	3768	

== Incidents ==
On 12 June 2020, the seventh car of set 7818 derailed while manoeuvering at Aoto Station. According to witnesses, the pantograph on the derailed car had detached from the train and became entangled with the overhead wire.

== Special liveries ==
On 19 September 2026, set 7318 was given a special livery with red and green stripes, evoking the former livery carried by the former 9000 series that operated until 2017.

== See also ==
- Chiba New Town Railway 9800 series, a similar design owned by the Chiba New Town Railway
