= 3700 series =

3700 series may refer to:

== Train types ==
- Keisei 3700 series electric multiple unit
- Meitetsu 3700 series electric multiple unit
