= Toei 5500 series =

Japanese train type

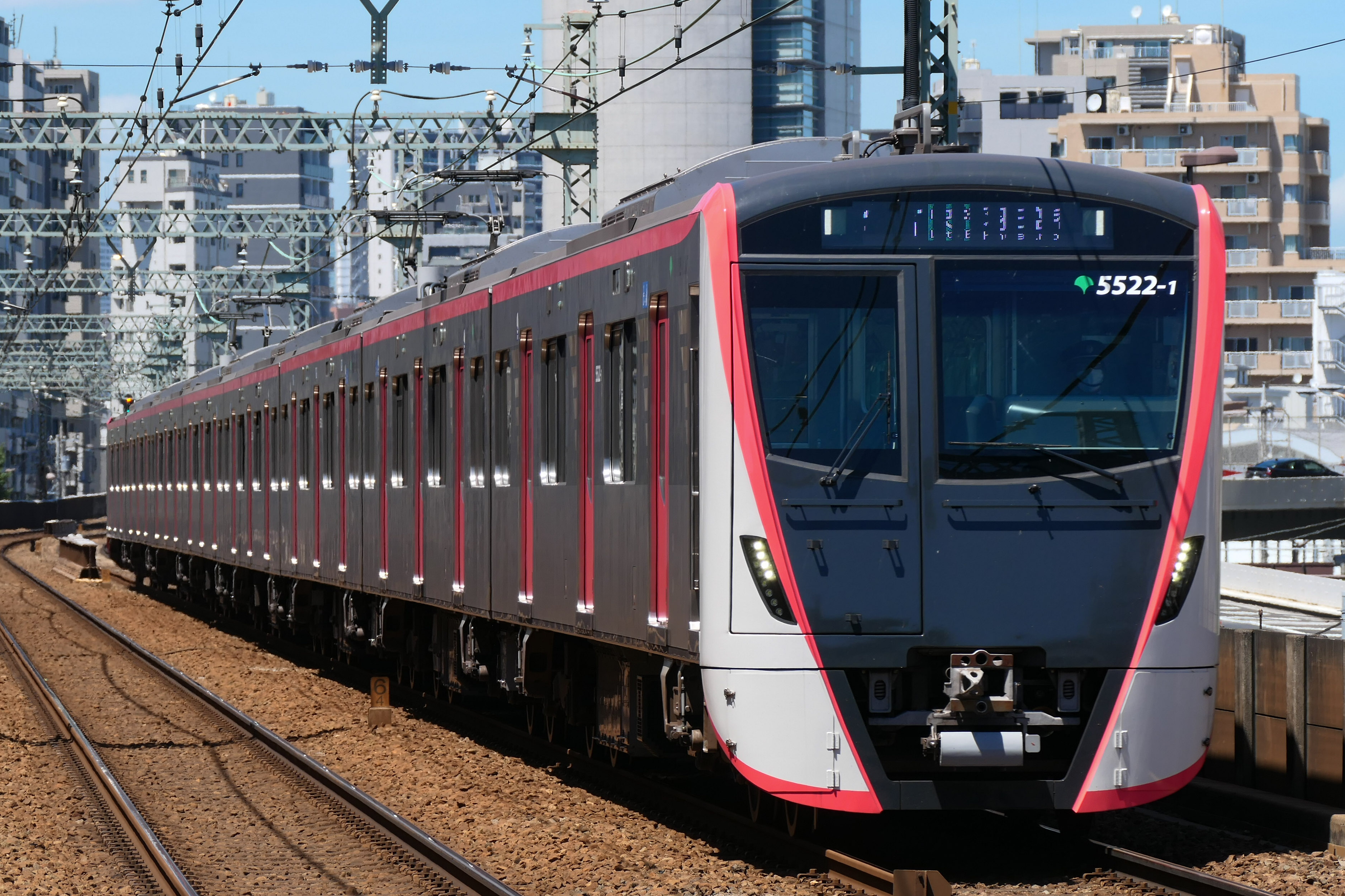
- Set 5522, July 2021
- In service: June 2018 – Present
- Manufacturer: J-TREC
- Built at: Yokohama, Kanagawa
- Family name: Sustina S13
- Replaced: Toei 5300 series
- Constructed: 2017–2021
- Entered service: 30 June 2018
- Number built: 216 vehicles (27 sets)
- Number in service: 216 vehicles (27 sets)
- Formation: 8 cars per trainset
- Fleet numbers: 5501–5527
- Operator: Tokyo Metropolitan Bureau of Transportation
- Lines served: Toei Asakusa Line; Keisei Main Line; Keisei Oshiage Line; Narita Sky Access Line; Hokuso Line; Keikyu Main Line; Keikyu Airport Line

Specifications
- Car body construction: Stainless steel
- Car length: 18 m (59 ft 1 in)
- Width: 2.76 m (9 ft 1 in)
- Height: 4,036 mm (13 ft 2.9 in) (4,045 mm (13 ft 3.3 in) with pantograph raised)
- Floor height: 1.13 m (3 ft 8 in)
- Doors: 3 pairs per side
- Maximum speed: 120 km/h (75 mph)
- Weight: 28.5–33.6 tonnes (28.0–33.1 long tons; 31.4–37.0 short tons) per car
- Traction system: Mitsubishi TINV-1B 2-level SiC-MOSFET–VVVF
- Traction motors: 4 × 155 kW (208 hp) 3-phase AC induction motor
- Power output: 3.72 MW (4,990 hp)
- Transmission: 83:14 (5.93:1) gear ratio
- Acceleration: 0.92 m/s^{2} (2.1 mph/s)
- Deceleration: 1.1 m/s^{2} (2.5 mph/s) (service); 1.3 m/s^{2} (2.9 mph/s) (emergency)
- Electric systems: Overhead line, 1,500 V DC
- Current collection: Pantograph
- Safety system: C-ATS
- Coupling system: Shibata
- Track gauge: 1,435 mm (4 ft 8 1/2 in) standard gauge

The Toei 5500 series (都営5500形, Toei 5500-gata) is an electric multiple unit (EMU) train type owned by Tokyo Metropolitan Bureau of Transportation (Toei) for use on Toei Asakusa Line services in Japan from June 2018.

== Design ==
The 5500 series were built by Japan Transport Engineering Company (J-TREC) as part of its "Sustina S13 Series" family of 18-metre (59 ft 1 in)-long, three-door stainless steel-bodied trains. The new trains have a maximum operating speed of 120 km/h (75 mph), compared to 110 km/h (68 mph) on the majority of the earlier Toei 5300 series fleet. In addition, they use energy-efficient three-phase induction motors controlled by two-level variable frequency drives using silicon carbide-based MOSFETs.

== Operations ==
They are used on the Toei Asakusa Line, Keikyu Main Line, Keikyu Airport Line, the Hokuso Line and the Keisei Line through services since 30 June 2018. They were introduced on Narita Sky Access Line services on 26 February 2022.

== Formation ==
As of July 2021, the fleet consists of 27 eight-car trainsets. The formations consist of 6 motored ("M") cars, and two non-powered trailer ("T") cars. Car 1 is on the south end.

Car No.	1	2	3	4	5	6	7	8
Designation	M1c	M2	M3	T4	T5	M6	M7	M8c
Numbering	55xx-1	55xx-2	55xx-3	55xx-4	55xx-5	55xx-6	55xx-7	55xx-8

- Cars 3 and 6 each have two single-arm type pantographs.

== Interior ==
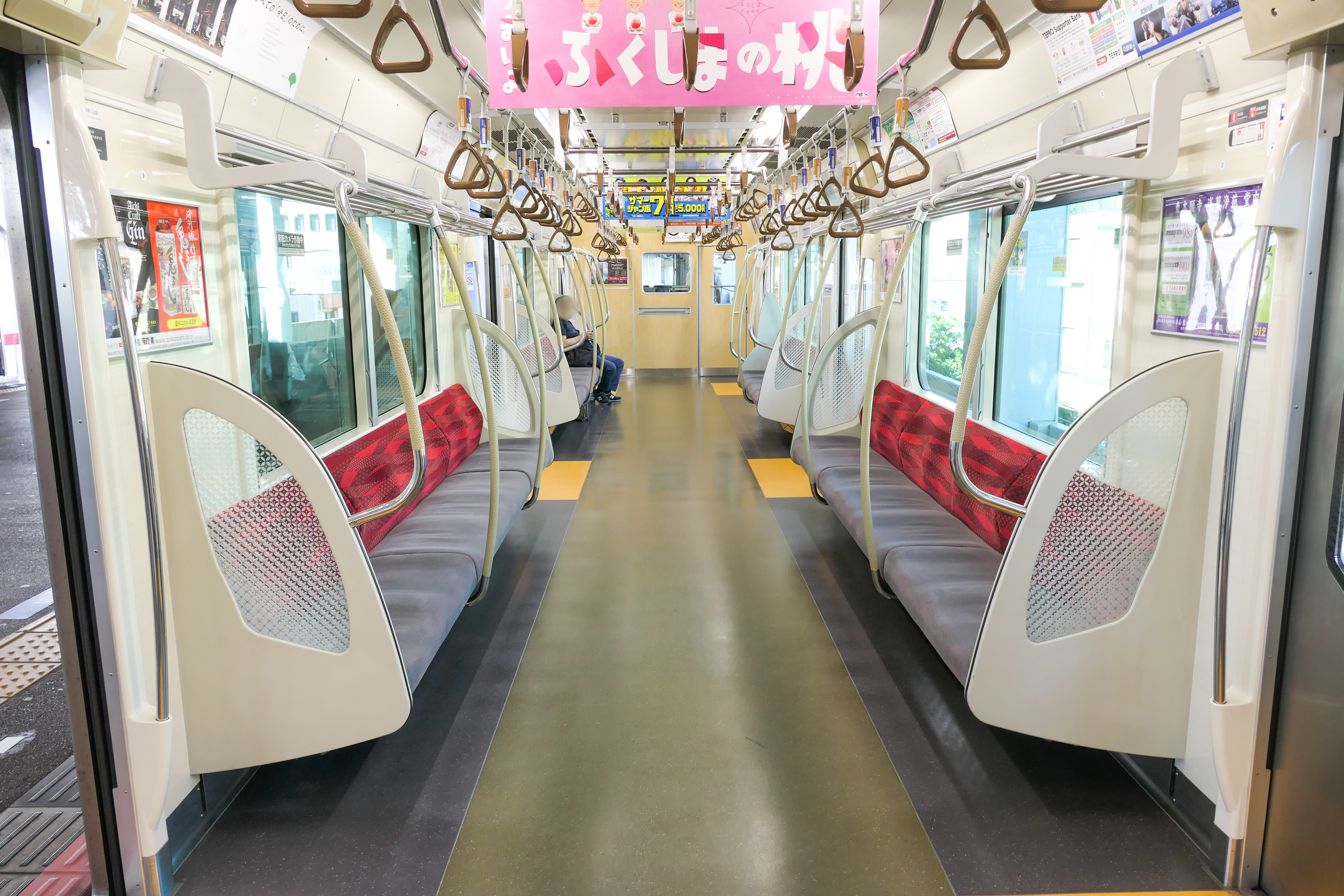
Interior view

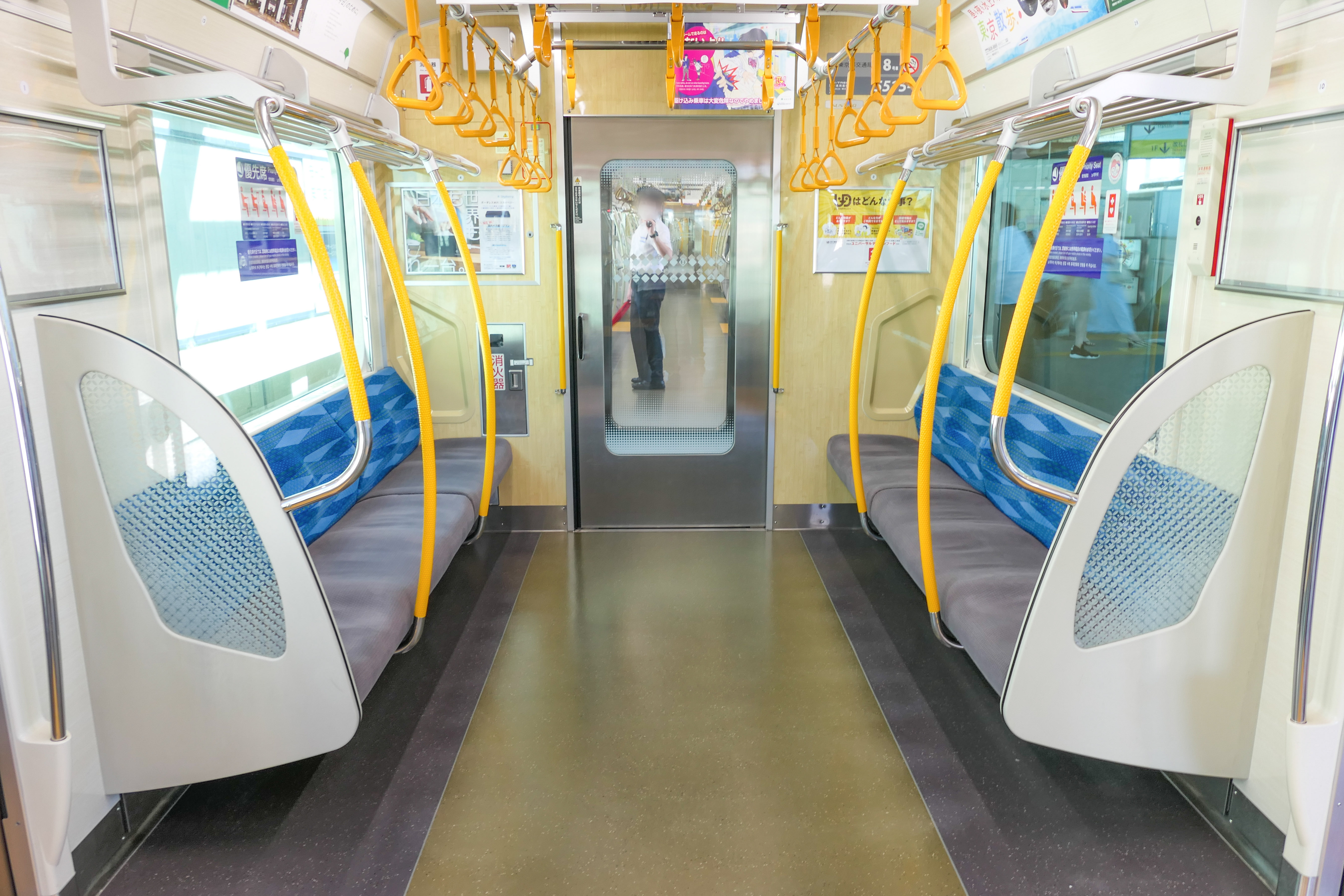
Priority seating

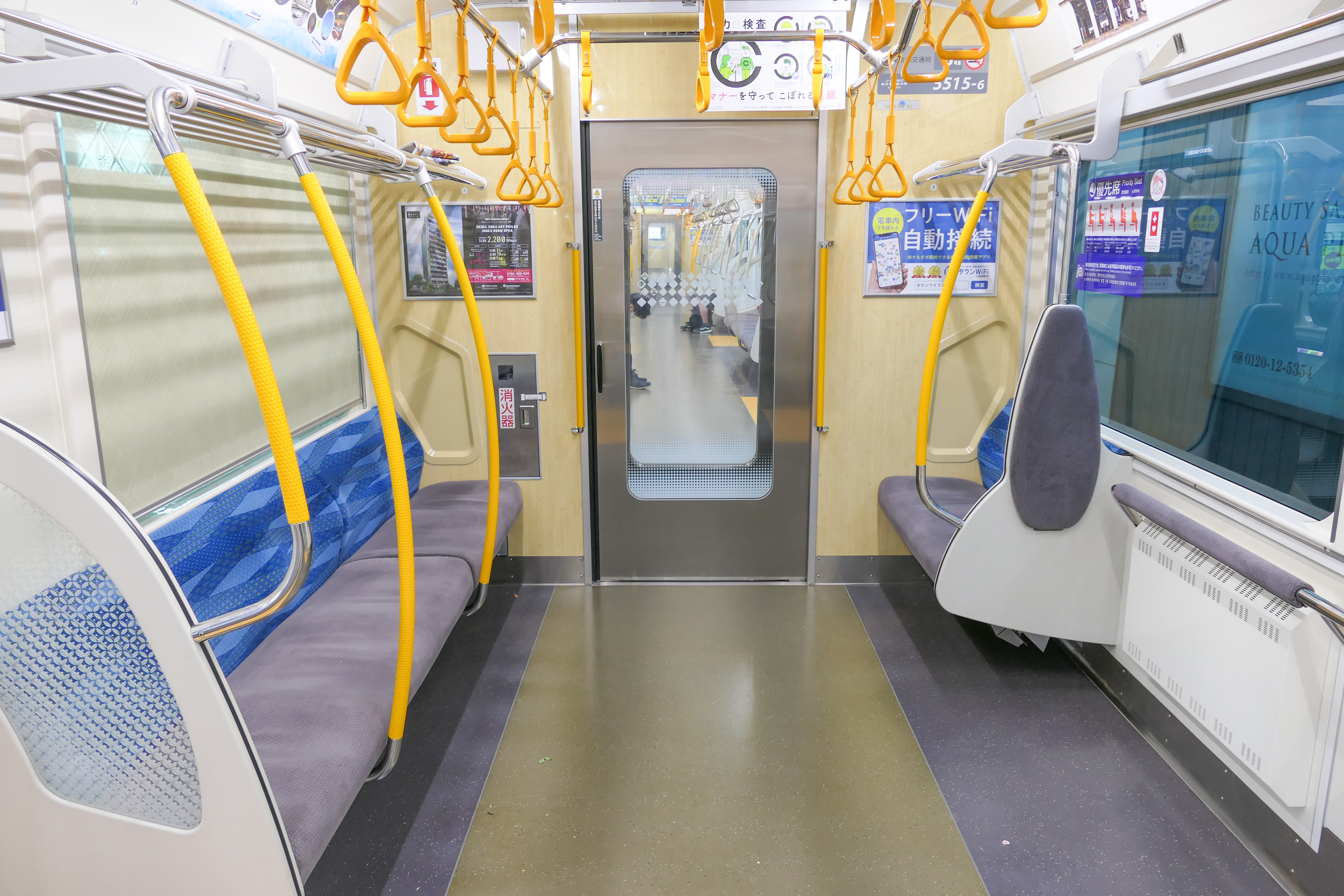
Priority seating with wheelchair space

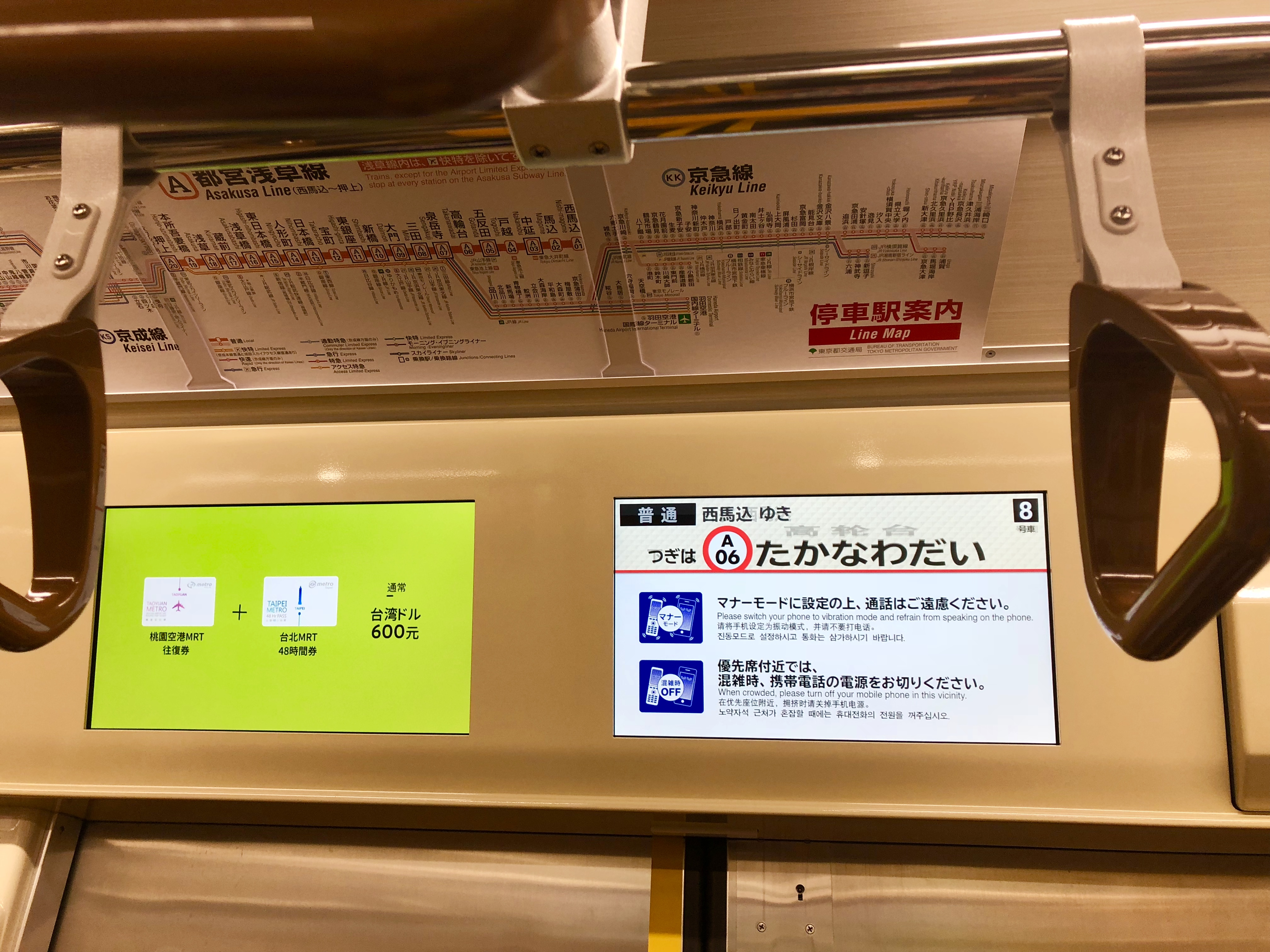
Twin LCD as used inside the Toei 5500 series

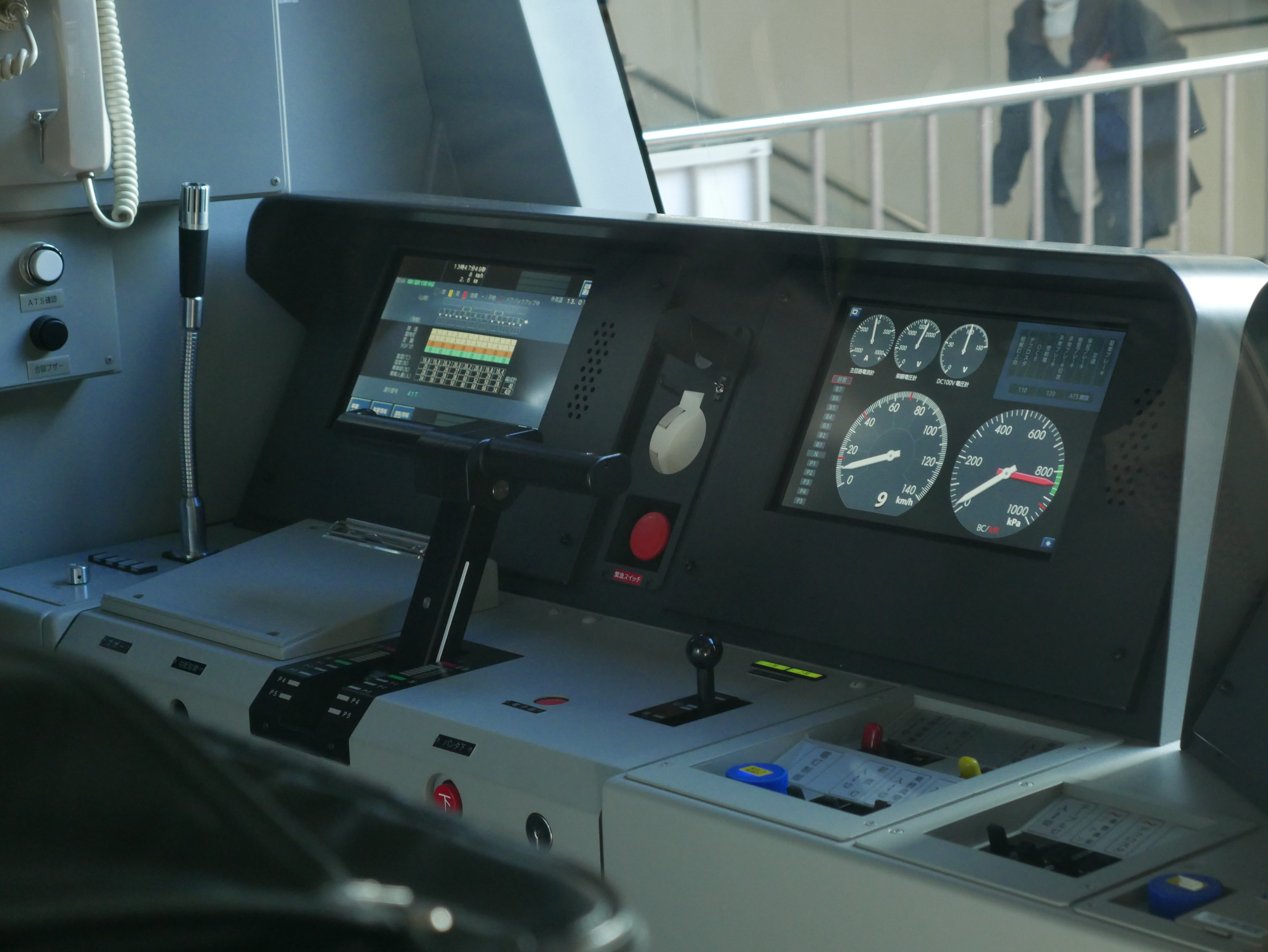
Driver's cab of the 5500 series

== History ==
Toei officially announced initial details of the new trains on 6 December 2016.

One eight-car set was delivered during fiscal 2017, and was to enter service in fiscal spring 2018. This will be followed by seven more sets in fiscal 2018, with 19 further sets delivered in subsequent years.

The trains entered service on 30 June 2018.

== Gallery ==
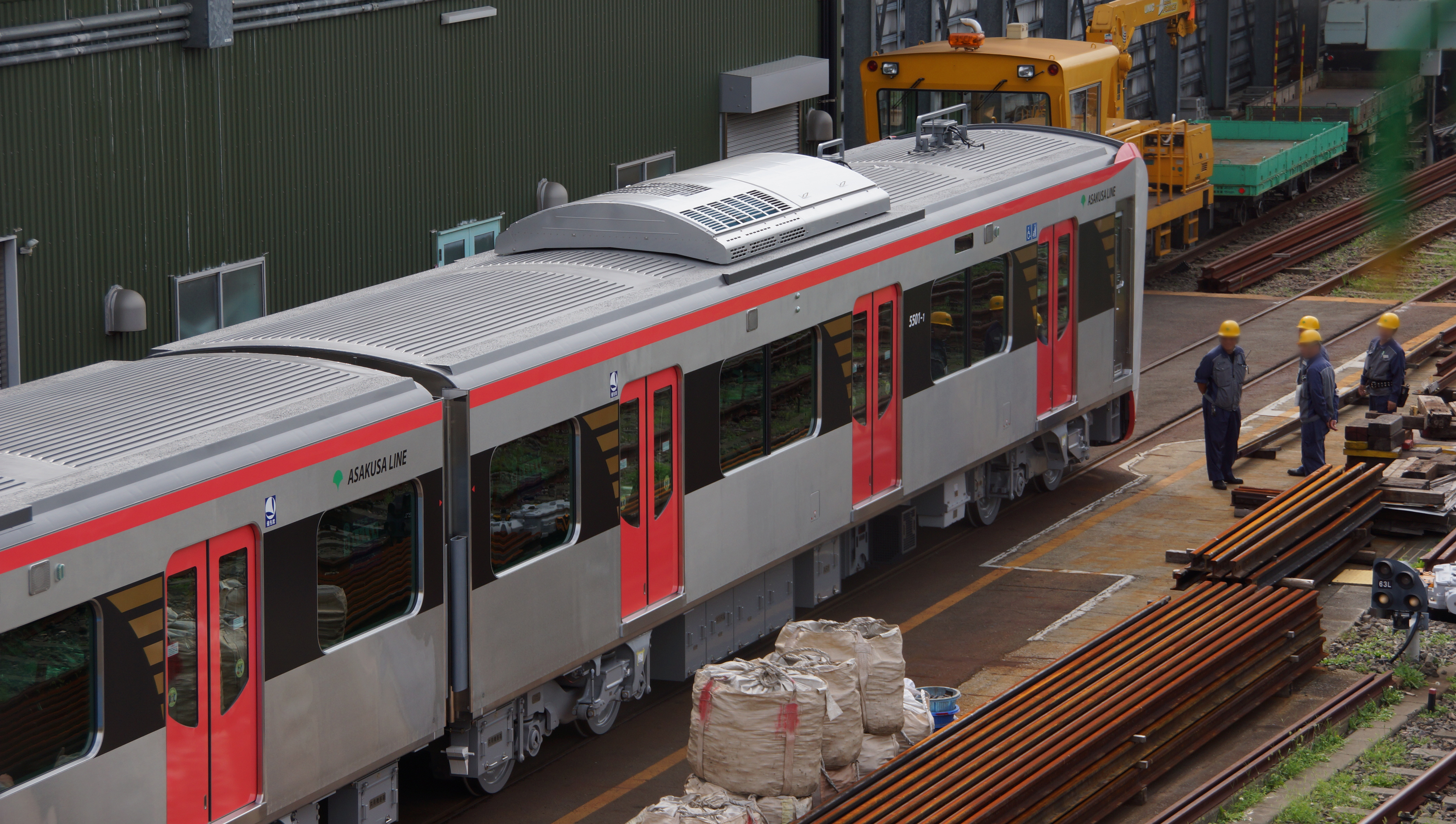
Toei 5500 series at Magome Depot, 2017
