= Keisei 3700 series =

Japanese train type

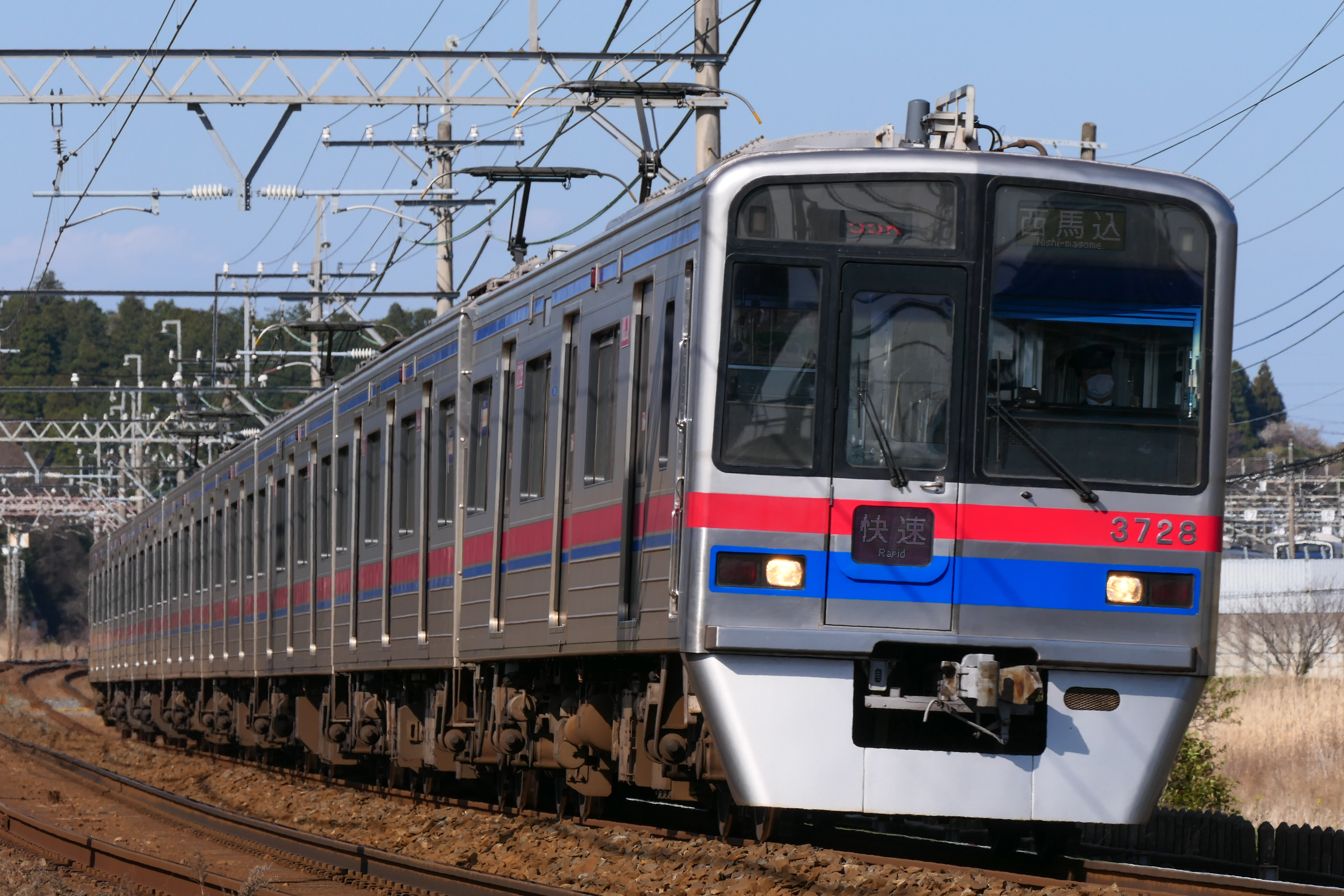
- 8-car set 3728 in March 2021
- Manufacturers: Nippon Sharyo, Tokyu Car Corporation
- Replaced: 3000 series
- Constructed: 1991–2001
- Entered service: 1991
- Number built: 132 vehicles (17 sets)
- Number in service: 98 vehicles (13 sets)
- Formation: 8/6 cars per set (6M2T/4M2T)
- Fleet numbers: 3708–3868
- Operator: Keisei Electric Railway
- Lines served: Keisei Main Line; Keisei Chiba Line; Keisei Chihara Line; Toei Asakusa Line; Keikyu Main Line; Keikyu Airport Line; Keikyu Kurihama Line

Specifications
- Car body construction: Stainless steel
- Doors: 3 pairs per side
- Maximum speed: 120 km/h (75 mph)
- Traction system: Variable frequency (GTO) (SiC)
- Electric systems: Overhead line, 1,500 V DC
- Current collection: Pantograph
- Track gauge: 1,435 mm (4 ft 8 1/2 in)

The Keisei 3700 series (京成3700形) is a commuter electric multiple unit (EMU) train type operated by the private railway operator Keisei Electric Railway in the Tokyo area of Japan since 1991.

== Operations ==
The 3700 series eight-car sets operate on the Keisei Main Line between Keisei Ueno and Narita Airport, including inter-running services over the Toei Asakusa Line and Keikyu Main Line to and from Haneda Airport through the Keikyu Airport Line, with occasional use on services on the Keikyu Kurihama Line. As of November 2014, the six-car sets are used solely on the Keisei Main Line.

== Formations ==
As of 1 March 2022, the fleet consists of 10 eight-car sets and three six-car sets. The sets are formed as follows, with car 1 at the Narita Airport end.

=== 6-car sets ===
Six-car sets 3828 and 3838 are formed as shown below, with four motored ("M") cars and two non-powered trailer ("T") cars.

Car No.	1	2	3	4	5	6
Designation	M2c	M1	T	T	M1	M2c
Numbering	38x1	38x2	38x3	38x4	38x5	38x6

The two M1 cars are each fitted with two single-arm pantographs.

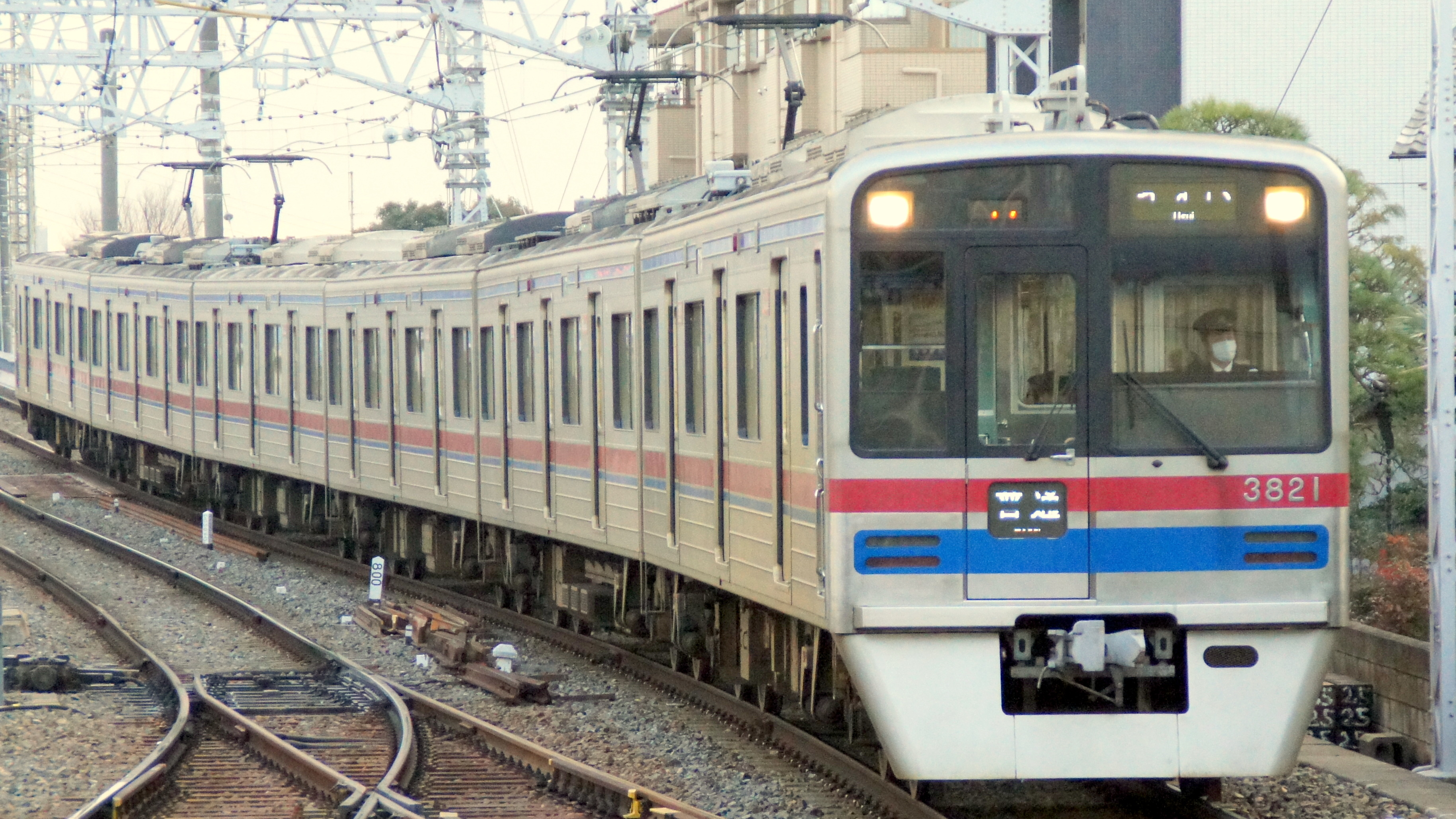
Six-car set 3828 in March 2012

=== 8-car sets ===
The eight-car sets are formed as shown below, with six motored ("M") cars and two non-powered trailer ("T") cars.

Car No.	1	2	3	4	5	6	7	8
Designation	M2c	M1	T	M2	M1'	T	M1	M2c
Numbering	3xx1	3xx2	3xx3	3xx4	3xx5	3xx6	3xx7	3xx8

The two M1 cars are each fitted with two pantographs, and the M1' car is fitted with one pantograph (cross-arm type for sets 3708 to 3818 and single-arm type for sets 3848 to 3868).

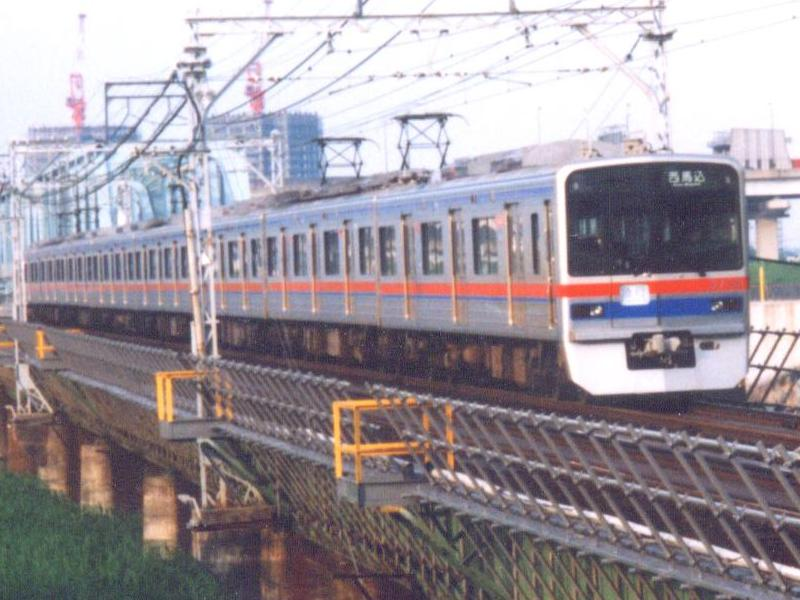
Eight-car set 3738 with hexagonal skirt in May 1995

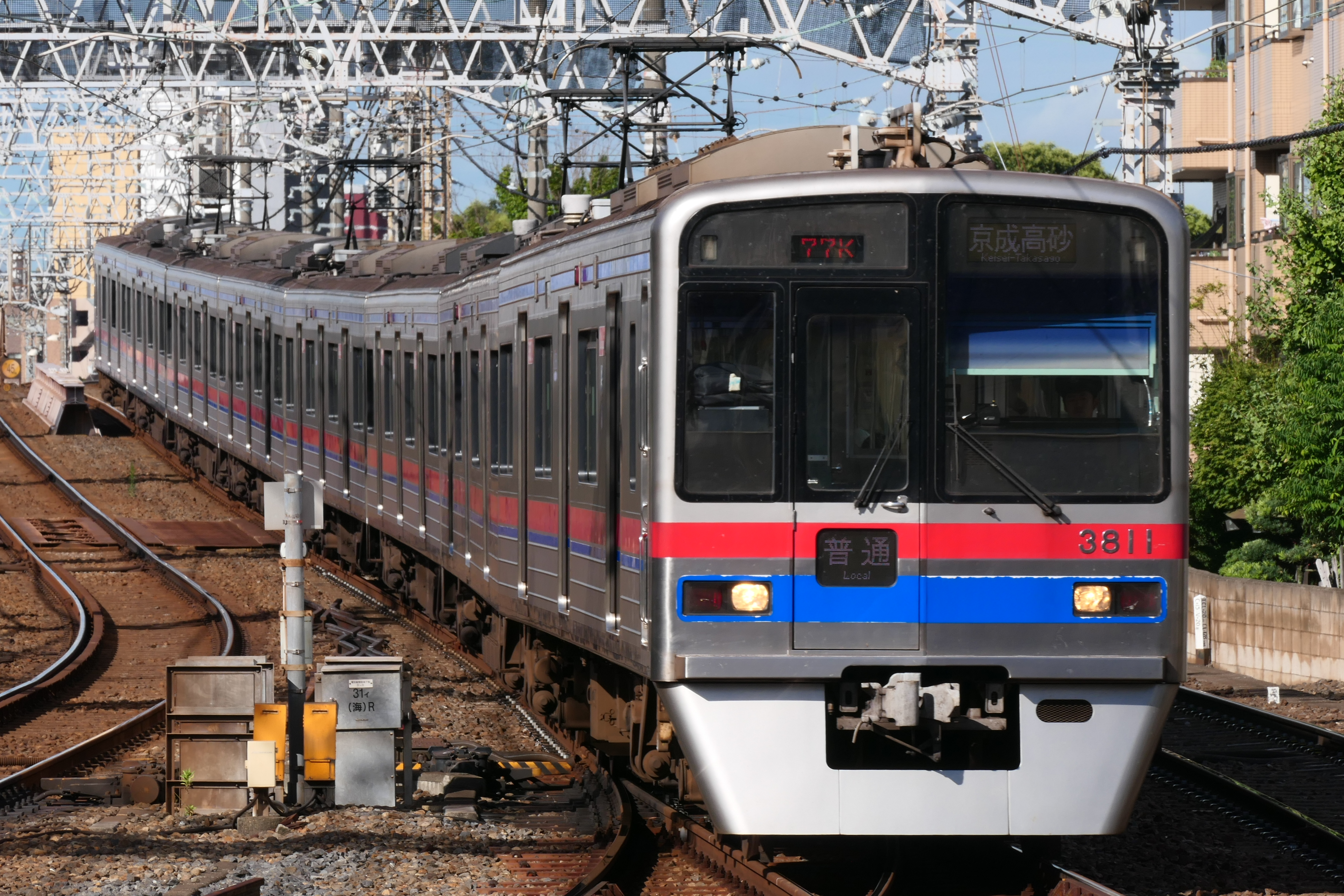
Eight-car set 3811 with original style front end in September 2020

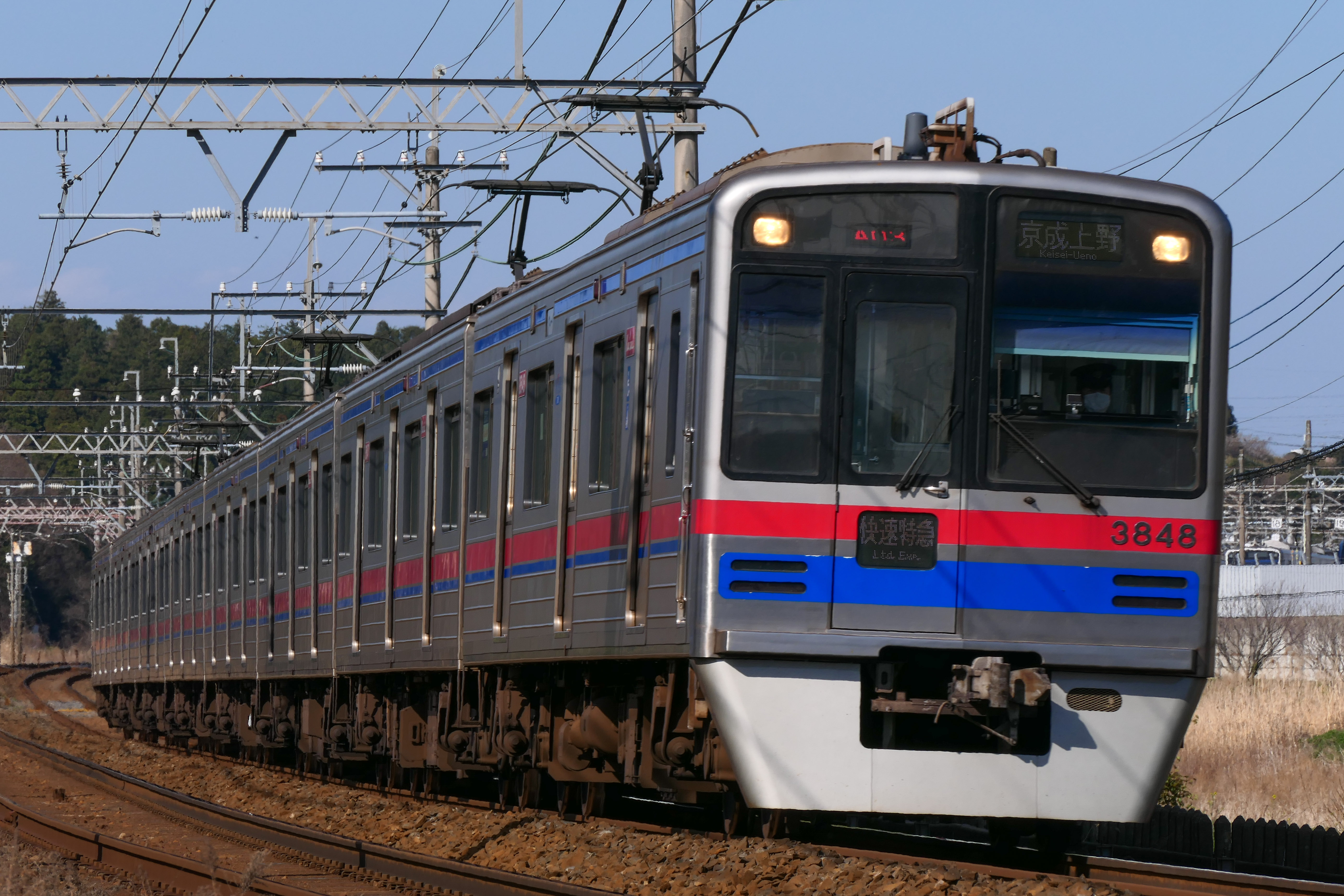
Eight-car set 3848 with later style front end in March 2021

== Interior ==
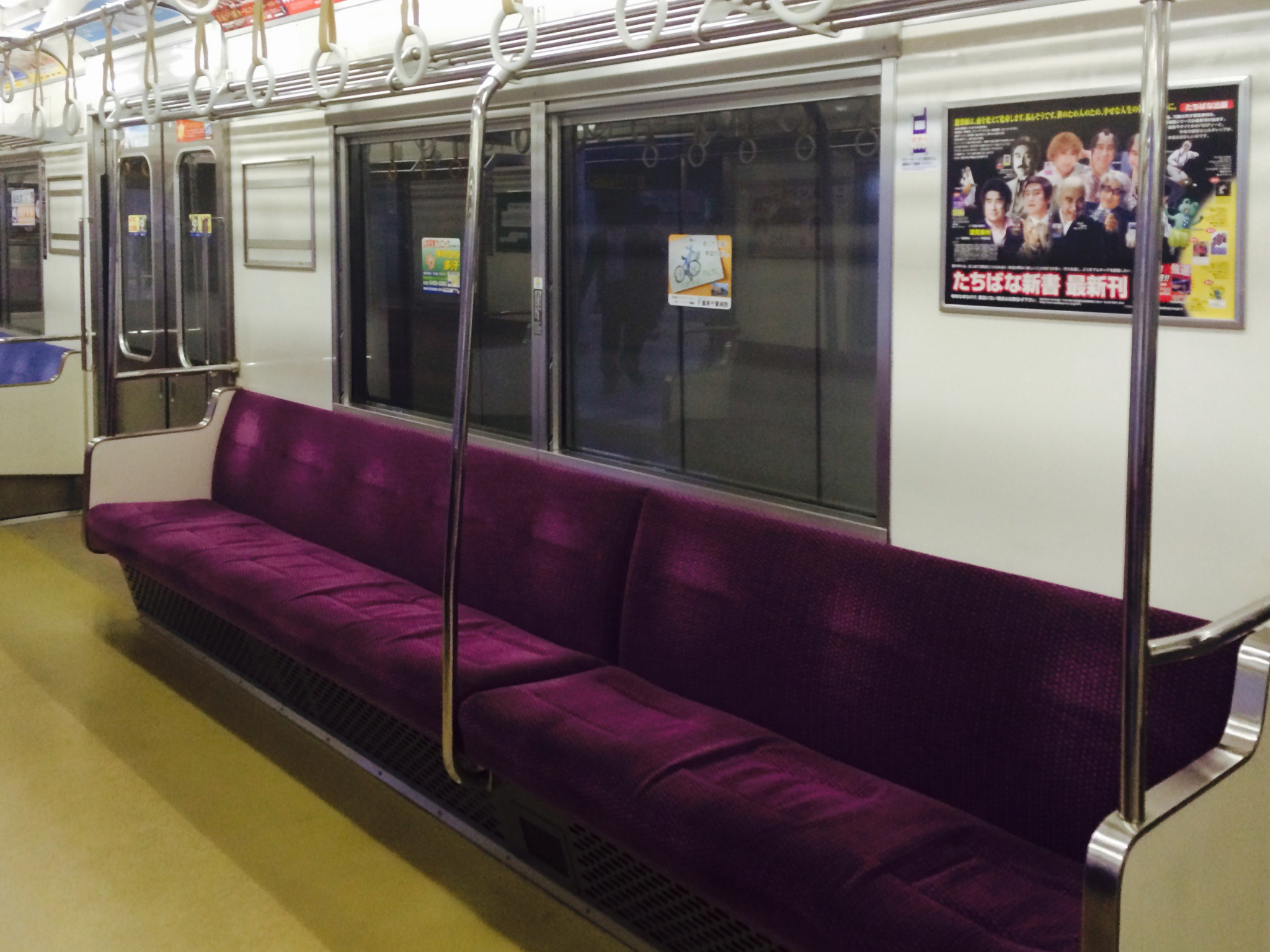
Longitudinal bench seating inside a 3700 series set in November 2014

Seating consists of longitudinal bench seating throughout.

== History ==
The first 3700 series sets were introduced in 1991, replacing the original 3000 series trains. The first six-car sets were delivered in 2000. Sets from the 6th batch onward (set 3828 onward) had restyled front ends with the headlights located near the roof. Two eight-car sets (3808 and 3748) were leased to the Hokuso Railway becoming Hokuso 7300 series sets 7808 and 7818, supplementing the two 7300 series sets owned by the Hokuso Railway.

In 2017, eight-car set 3738 was converted and renumbered to become Chiba New Town Railway 9800 series set 9808, owned by the Chiba New Town Railway and operated by the Hokuso Railway.

Eight-car set 3778 was transferred to the Hokuso Railway, becoming 7300 series set 7828. The transferred set began revenue service with the Hokuso Railway on 26 February 2018.

In December 2021, eight-car set 3768 was leased to the Hokuso Railway and became 7300 series set 7838. In addition, 7300 series set 7818 was returned to Keisei; it regained its original set number (3748) and was shortened to a six-car formation.

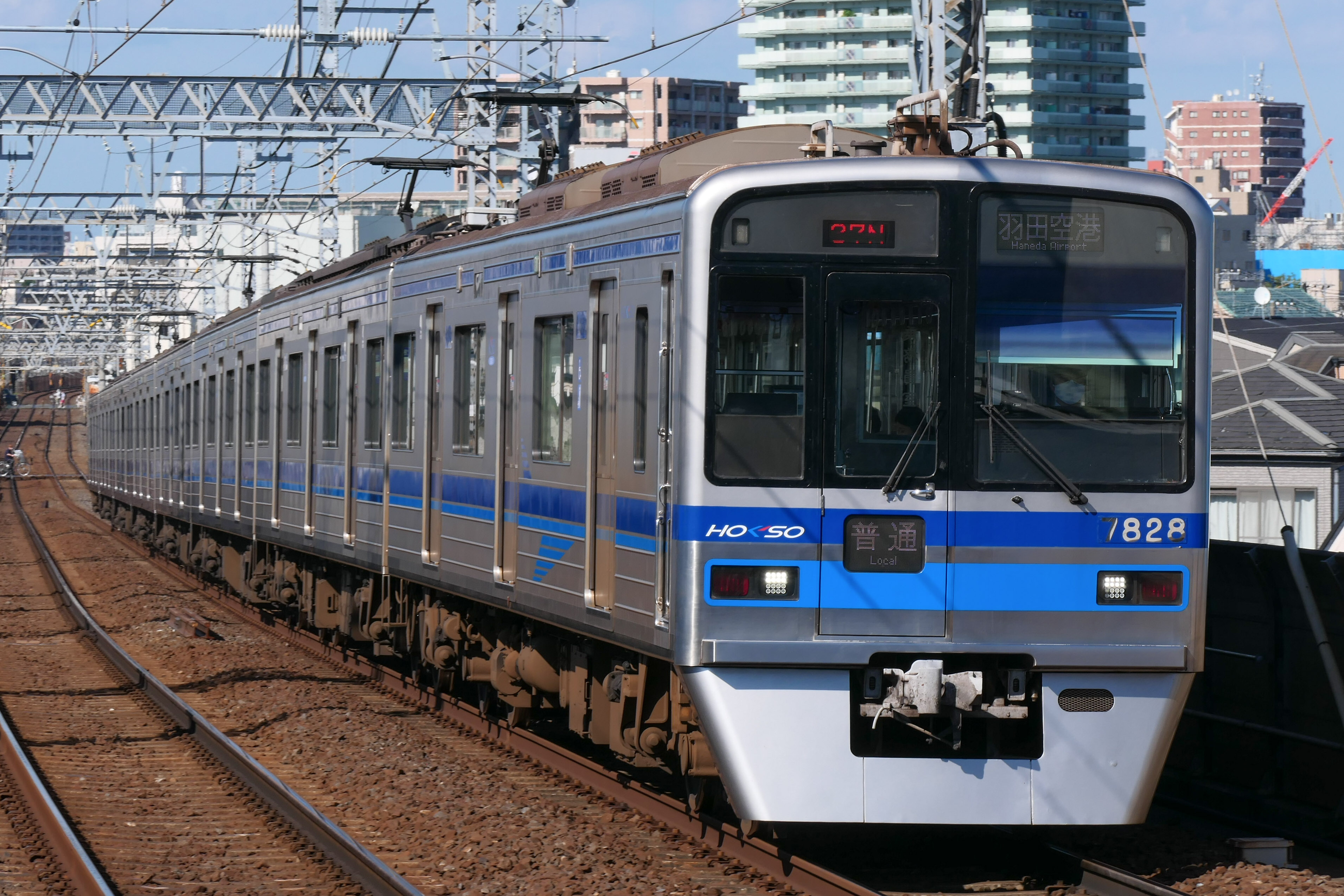
Hokuso Railway 7300 series set 7828, formerly Keisei 3700 series set 3778, in July 2021

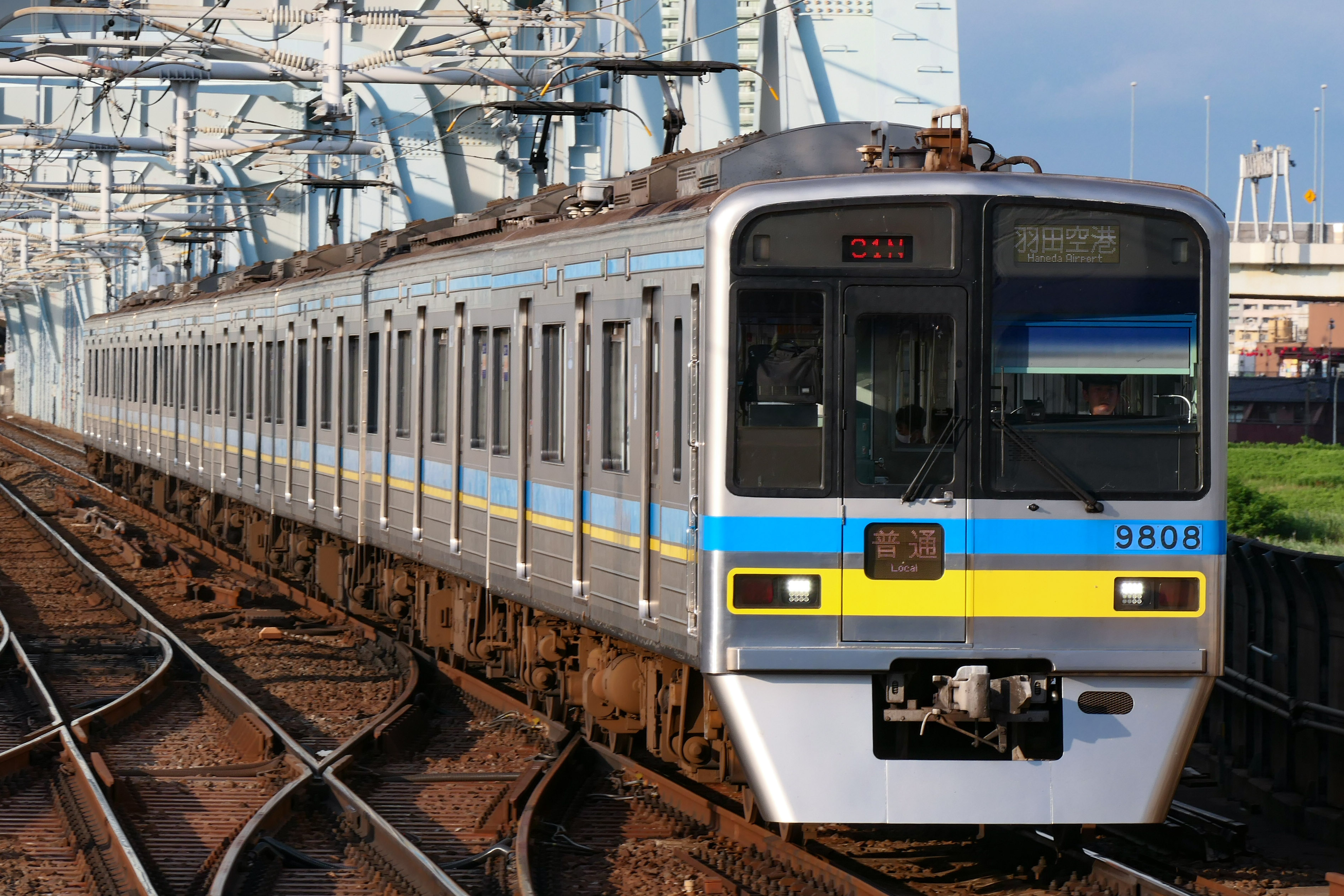
Chiba New Town Railway 9800 series set 9808, formerly Keisei 3700 series set 3738, in July 2021
