= Chiba New Town Railway 9800 series =

Class of 1 Japanese 8-car electric multiple unit

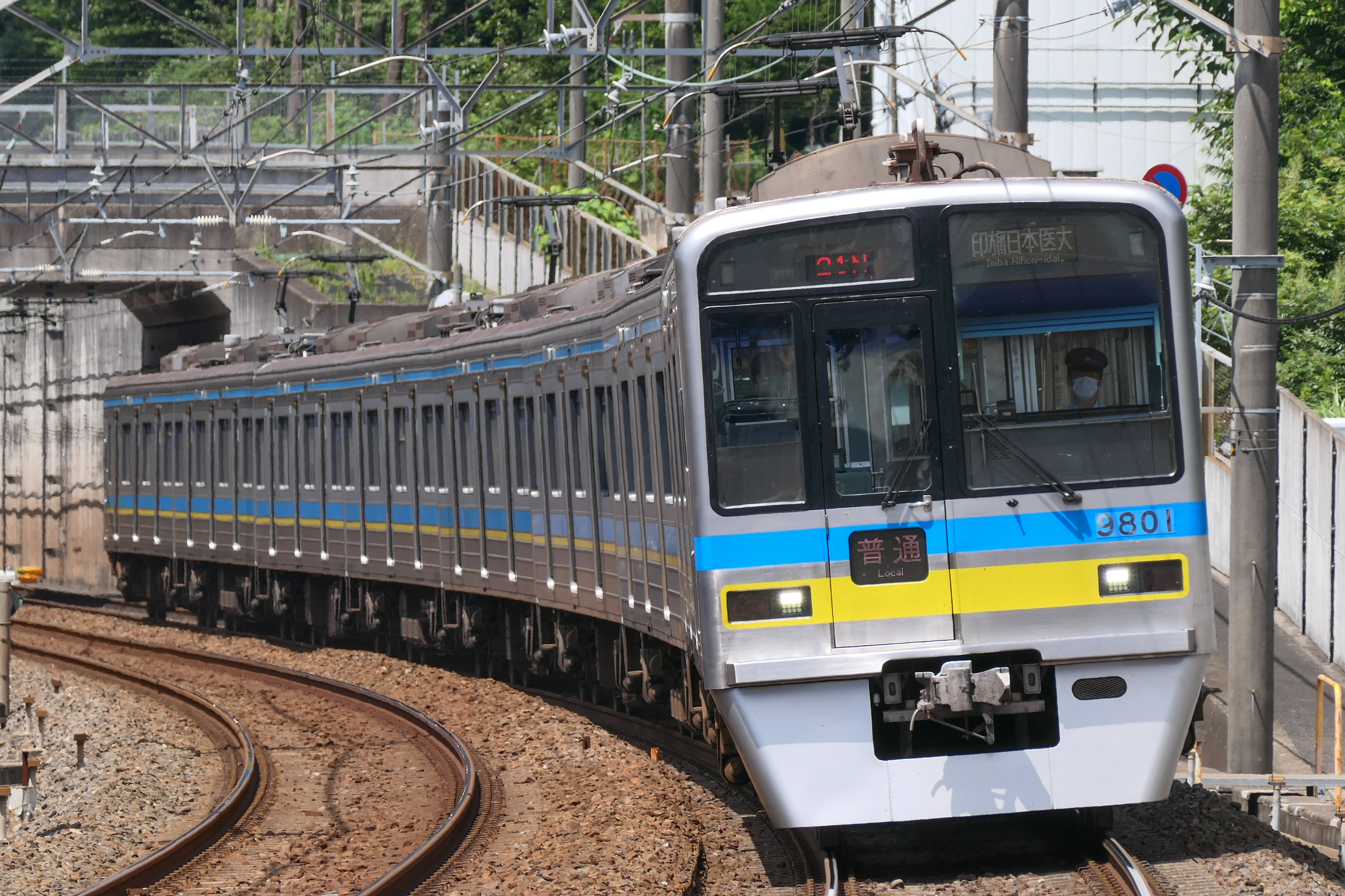
- Set 9808 in July 2021
- Replaced: Chiba New Town Railway 9000 series
- Entered service: 21 March 2017
- Number built: 8 vehicles (1 set)
- Number in service: 8 vehicles (1 set)
- Formation: 8 cars per trainset
- Fleet numbers: 9808
- Owner: Chiba New Town Railway
- Operator: Hokuso Railway
- Depot: Inba
- Lines served: Hokuso Line; Keisei Main Line; Keisei Oshiage Line; Toei Asakusa Line; Keikyu Main Line; Keikyu Airport Line

Specifications
- Car body construction: Stainless steel
- Car length: 18 m (59 ft 1 in)
- Doors: 3 pairs per side
- Maximum speed: 120 km/h (75 mph)
- Electric system: 1,500 V DC
- Current collection: Overhead catenary
- Track gauge: 1,435 mm (4 ft 8 1/2 in)

The Chiba New Town Railway 9800 series (千葉ニュータウン鉄道9800形) is a commuter electric multiple unit (EMU) train type owned by the third-sector railway company Chiba New Town Railway and operated by the Hokuso Railway on the Hokuso Line in Japan since 21 March 2017. The sole eight-car trainset, 9808, was converted and renumbered from former Keisei 3700 series EMU set 3738 to replace the former Chiba New Town Railway 9000 series EMU withdrawn following its last day in service on 20 March 2017.

== Formation ==
As of 1 April 2017, the fleet consists of a single eight-car set formed as shown below, with six motored (M) cars and two trailer (T) cars, and car 1 at the southern end.

Car No.	1	2	3	4	5	6	7	8
Designation	M2c	M1	T	M1'	M2	T	M1	M2c
Numbering	9808	9807	9806	9805	9804	9803	9802	9801

The two M1 cars each have two single-arm pantographs, and the M1' car has one.

== See also ==
- Hokuso 7300 series, a similar type owned by Hokuso Railway
