= Chiba New Town Railway 9000 series =

Japanese train type

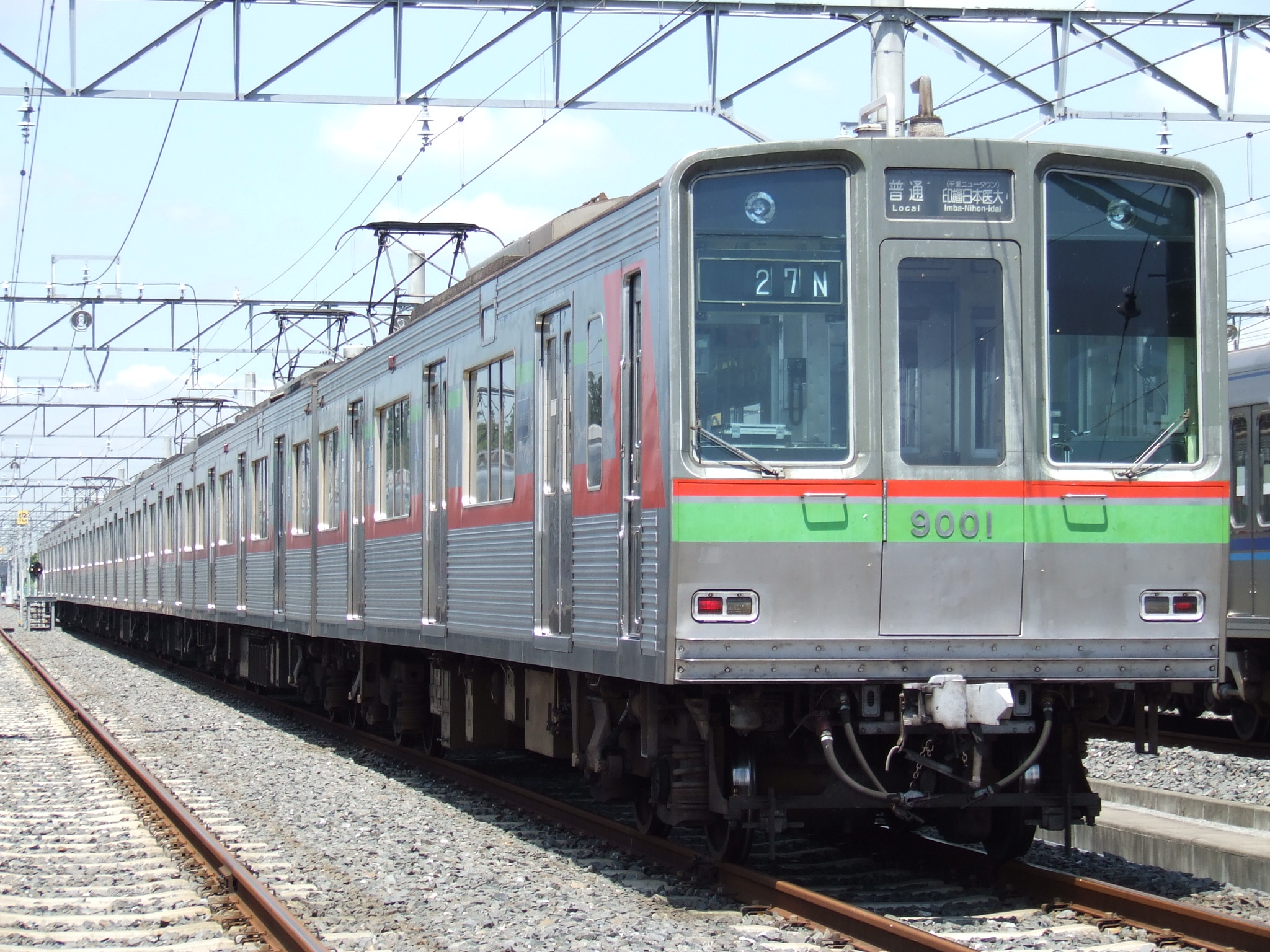
- Set 9008 in August 2007
- In service: 1984 - 2017
- Entered service: 1984
- Scrapped: 2013 - 2017
- Number built: 16 vehicles (2 sets)
- Number in service: None
- Number preserved: None
- Number scrapped: 16 vehicles
- Formation: 8 cars (formerly 6 cars) per trainset
- Fleet numbers: 9008, 9018
- Operators: Hokuso Railway
- Lines served: Hokuso Line, Keisei Main Line, Toei Asakusa Line, Keikyu Main Line

Specifications
- Car body construction: Stainless steel
- Car length: 18 m (59 ft 1 in)
- Doors: 3 pairs per side
- Traction system: Field chopper
- Electric system(s): 1,500 V DC
- Current collection: Overhead catenary
- Track gauge: 1,435 mm (4 ft 8 1/2 in)

The Chiba New Town Railway 9000 series (千葉ニュータウン鉄道9000形) was a commuter electric multiple unit (EMU) train type formerly owned by the third-sector railway company Chiba New Town Railway and operated by the Hokuso Railway on the Hokuso Line in Japan from 1984 until 20 March 2017.

== Formation ==
The two eight-car trains, 9008 and 9018, were formed as follows, with six motored ("M") cars and two non-powered trailer ("T") cars.

Designation	M2c	M1	T	M2'	M1'	T	M1	M2c
Numbering	90xx	90xx	90xx	90xx	90xx	90xx	90xx	90xx

The cars of set 9008 were numbered in sequence from 9001 to 9008, and the cars of set 9018 were numbered in sequence from 9011 to 9018. The two M1 cars each had two lozenge-type pantograph, while the M1' car had one.

== History ==
The trains were introduced in 1984, coinciding with the opening of the section of the Hokuso Line between Komuro and Chiba New Town Chūō. The trains were initially classified as "2000 series", and formed as six-car sets. The two six-car train sets were lengthened to eight cars each in 1991, coinciding with the start of inter-running services to and from the Toei Asakusa Line. In 1994, the trains were reclassified 9000 series to avoid confusion with the Keikyu 2000 series trains on the Keikyu Main Line, over which the trains also inter-ran.

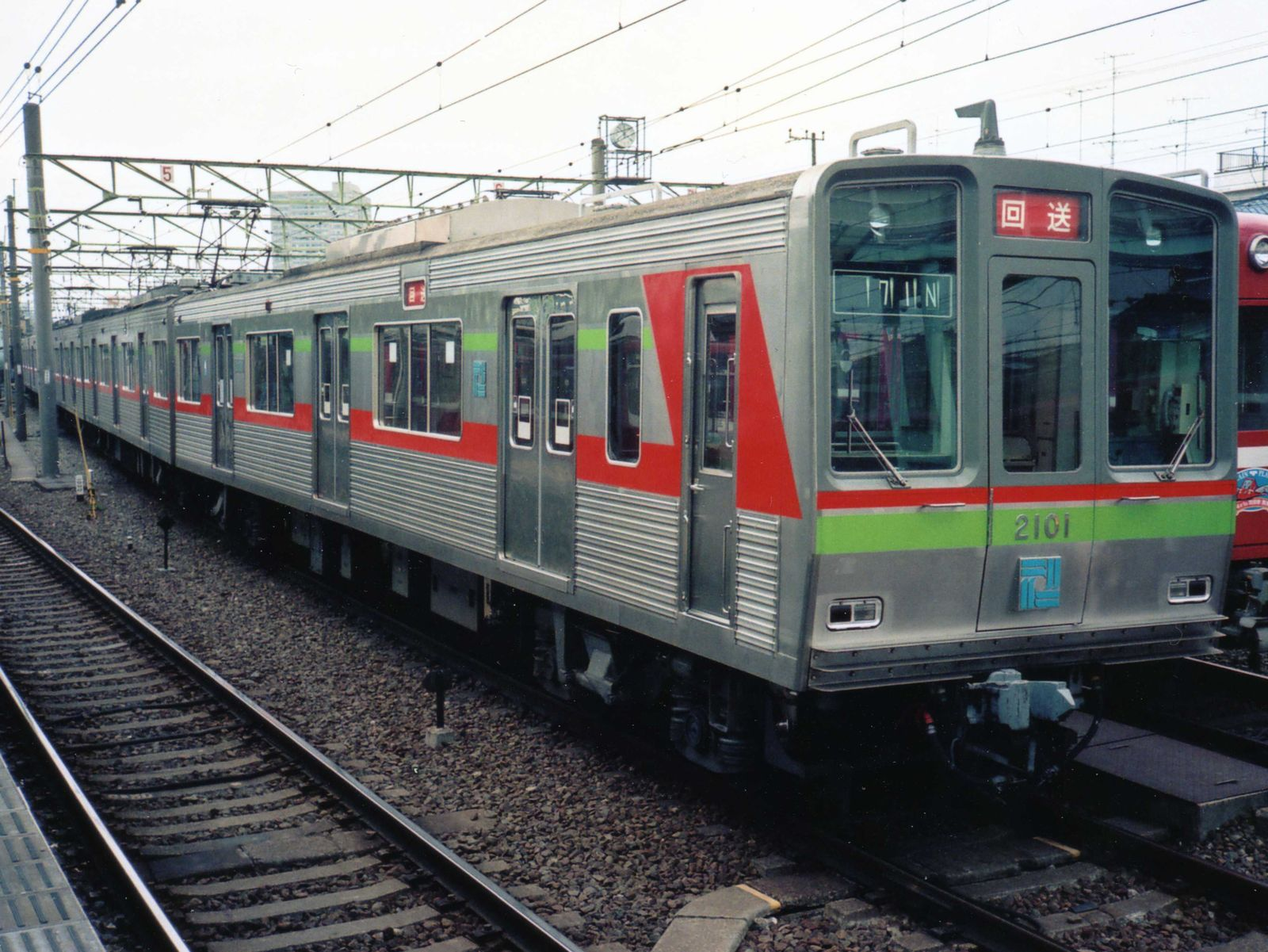
Set 2001 (later set 9008) in 1993

=== Withdrawal ===
Set 9008 was withdrawn in 2013, and set 9018 was withdrawn following its last day in service on 20 March 2017, replaced by 9800 series set 9808.
