= Shin-Shibamata Station =

Railway station in Tokyo, Japan

HS01 Shin-Shibamata Station 新柴又駅
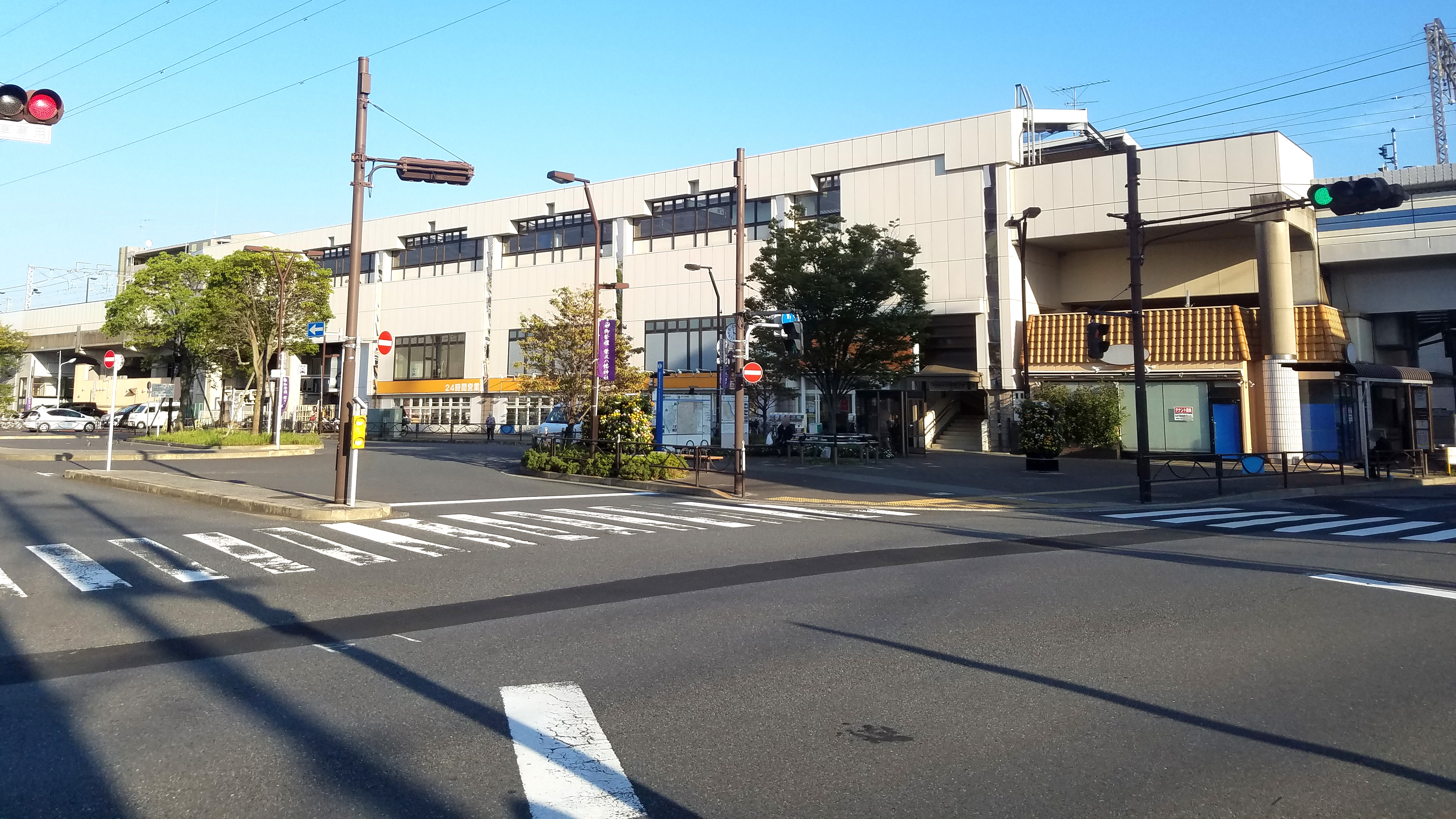
- Shin-Shibamata Station in October 2019

General information
- Location: 5-7-1 Shibamata, Katsushika City, Tokyo; Japan
- Coordinates: 35.7511°N 139.8793°E
- Operator: Hokusō Railway
- Line: Hokusō Line
- Platforms: 2 side platforms
- Tracks: 2

Other information
- Station code: HS01
- Website: www.hokuso-railway.co.jp/railway/station/shinshibamata.html

History
- Opened: March 31, 1991

Passengers
- FY2016: 4,336 daily

Services
Preceding station	Hokusō Railway	Following station
Keisei Takasago KS10 Terminus	Hokusō Line Local	Yagiri HS02 towards Imba Nihon-idai
Location
- Location within Tokyo Location within Japan

Shin-Shibamata Station (新柴又駅, Shin-Shibamata-eki) is a railway station in Katsushika, Tokyo, Japan, operated by Hokusō Railway.

== Lines ==
- Hokusō Railway
  - Hokusō Line

== Layout ==
This elevated station consists of two side platforms serving two tracks.

=== Platforms ===
1	Hokusō Line	for Keisei-Takasago; Keisei Oshiage Line for Oshiage; Toei Asakusa Line for Nihombashi and Nishi-magome; Keikyū Main Line for Shinagawa, Haneda Airport (International Terminal and Domestic Terminal), and Misakiguchi
2	Hokusō Line	for Higashi-Matsudo, Shin-Kamagaya, and Imba Nihon-idai

== Surrounding area ==
- Edogawa River
- Yakiri-no-watashi (Yagiri-no-watashi) Ferry
- Shibamata Taishakuten
- Shibamata Station ( Keisei Kanamachi Line)
