= Keisei Kanamachi Station =

Railway station in Tokyo, Japan

KS51 Keisei Kanamachi Station 京成金町駅
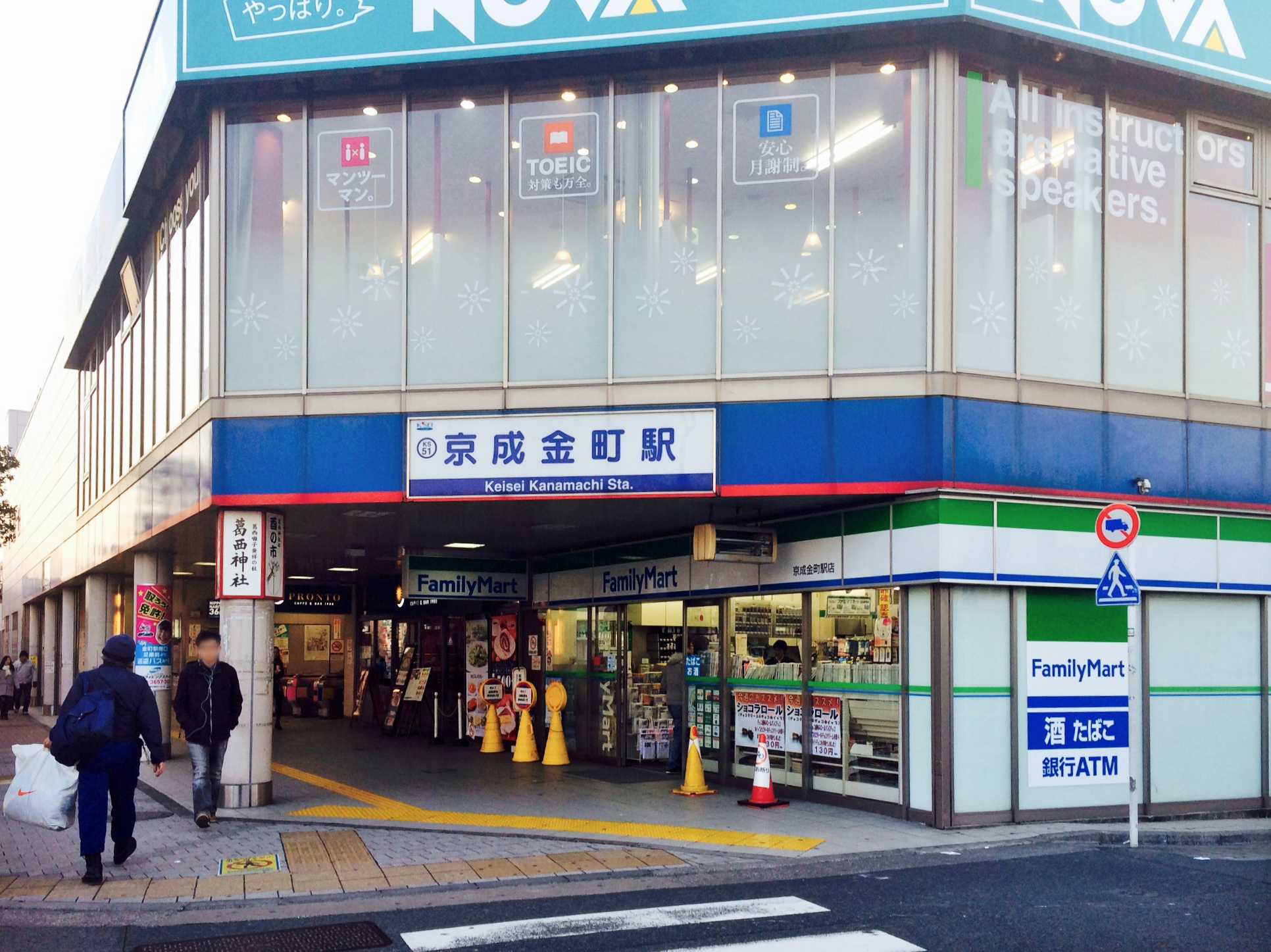
- The station entrance in January 2016

General information
- Location: Kanamachi, Katsushika-ku, Tokyo; Japan
- Coordinates: 35°46′6.6″N 139°52′13.7″E
- Operator: Keisei Electric Railway
- Line: Keisei Kanamachi Line
- Distance: 2.5 km from Keisei Takasago
- Platforms: 1 side platform
- Tracks: 1
- Connections: JL21 Kanamachi Station; Bus stop

Construction
- Structure type: Ground-level

Other information
- Station code: KS51

History
- Opened: 21 October 1913
- Former names: Kanamachi (until 1931)

Services
Preceding station	Keisei	Following station
Shibamata KS50 towards Keisei Takasago	Kanamachi Line	Terminus
Location

Keisei Kanamachi Station (京成金町駅, Keisei Kanamachi-eki) is a railway station on the Keisei Kanamachi Line in Katsushika, Tokyo, Japan, operated by the private railway operator Keisei Electric Railway. The station is located adjacent to Kanamachi Station on the Joban Line operated by JR East.

== Lines ==
Keisei Kanamachi Station is the terminus of the 2.5 km Keisei Kanamachi Line from Keisei Takasago.

== Station layout ==
The terminus station is composed of a single platform serving one track.

=== Platform ===
Keisei Kanamachi Line	for Keisei-Takasago

== History ==
Keisei Kanamachi station opened on 21 October 1913, initially named Kanamachi Station. The station was renamed Keisei Kanamachi Station on 18 November 1931.

Station numbering was introduced to all Keisei Line stations on 17 June 2010. Keisei Kanamachi was assigned station number KS51.

== Surrounding area ==
- Kanamachi Station (Joban Line)
- Mizumoto Park
- Edogawa River
- National Route 6

== See also ==
- List of railway stations in Japan
