= Yagiri Station =

Railway station in Matsudo, Chiba Prefecture, Japan

HS02 Yagiri Station 矢切駅
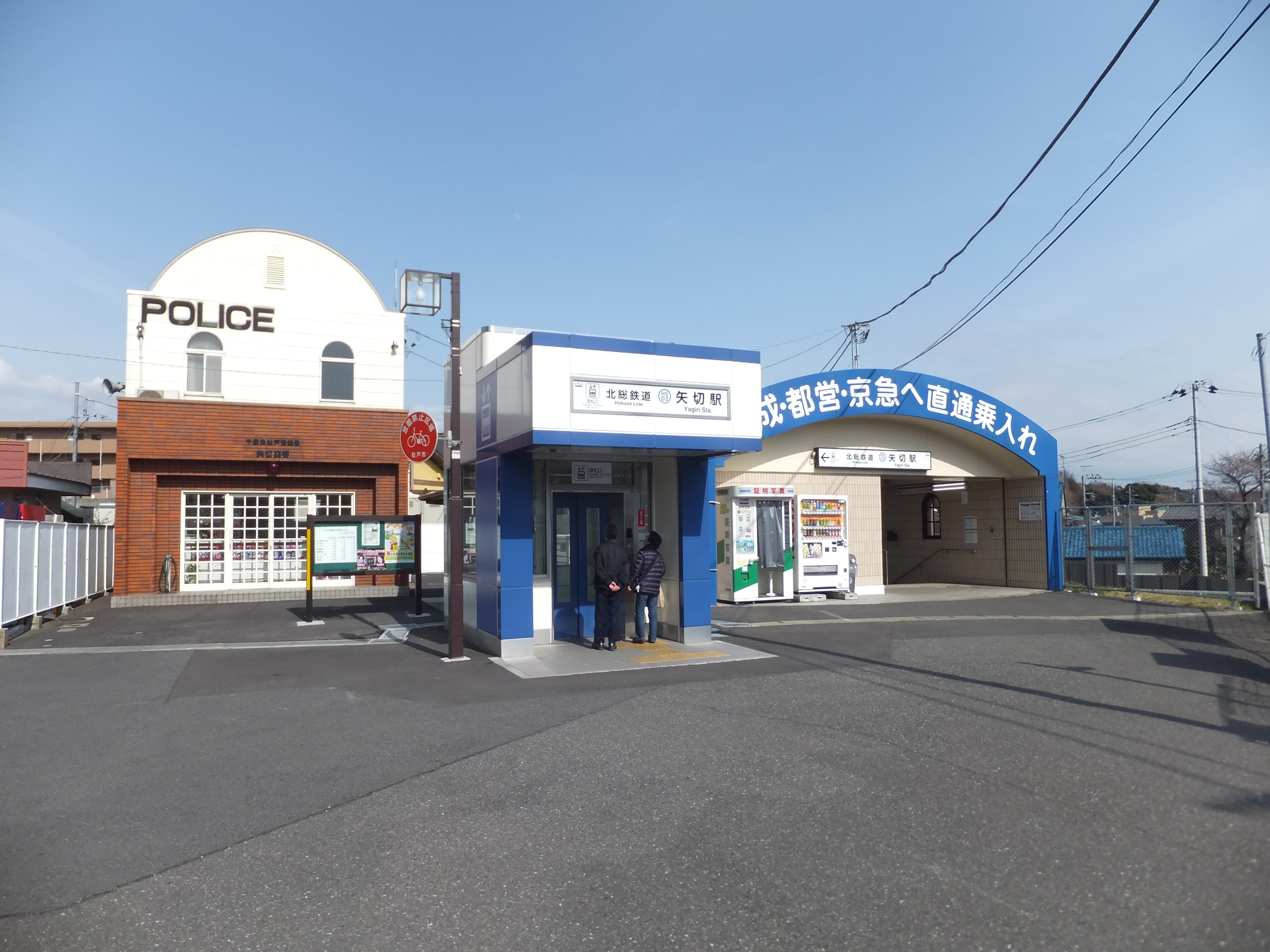
- Yagiri Station, April 2012

General information
- Location: 120 Shimo-yakiri, Matsudo-shi, Chiba-ken 271-0096; Japan
- Coordinates: 35.7575°N 139.8998°E
- Operator: Hokusō Railway
- Line: Hokusō Line
- Distance: 3.2 km from Keisei-Takasago
- Platforms: 2 island platforms
- Tracks: 4

Other information
- Station code: HS02
- Website: Official website

History
- Opened: 31 March 1991

Passengers
- FY2018: 8056

Services
Preceding station	Hokusō Railway	Following station
Shin-Shibamata HS01 towards Keisei Takasago	Hokusō Line Local	Kita-Kokubun HS03 towards Imba Nihon-idai
Location
- Location within Chiba Prefecture Location within Japan

Yagiri Station (矢切駅, Yagiri-eki) is a passenger railway station in the city of Matsudo, Chiba, Japan, operated by the third sector Hokusō Railway.

== Lines ==
Yagiri Station is served by the Hokusō Line and is located 3.2 kilometers from the terminus of the line at Keisei-Takasago.

== Station layout ==
This underground station consists of two island platforms serving four tracks.

=== Platforms ===
1-2	Hokusō Line	for Keisei-Takasago; Keisei Oshiage Line for Oshiage; Toei Asakusa Line for Nishi-magome; Keikyū Main Line for Shinagawa and Haneda Airport (International Terminal and Domestic Terminal)
3-4	Hokusō Line	for Higashi-Matsudo, Shin-Kamagaya, and Imba Nihon-idai

== History ==
Yagiri Station was opened on 31 March 1991. On 17 July 2010 a station numbering system was introduced to the Hokusō Line, with the station designated HS02.

== Passenger statistics ==
In fiscal 2018, the station was used by an average of 8056 passengers daily.

== Surrounding area ==
- Matsudo-Yagiri Post Office
- Matsudi City Hall – Yagiri branch office
- Yagiri ferry
- Tokyo Medical and Dental University
- Wayo Women's University
- Chiba University of Commerce

== See also ==
- List of railway stations in Japan
