= Kita-Kokubun Station =

Railway station in Ichikawa, Chiba Prefecture, Japan

HS03 Kita-Kokubun Station 北国分駅
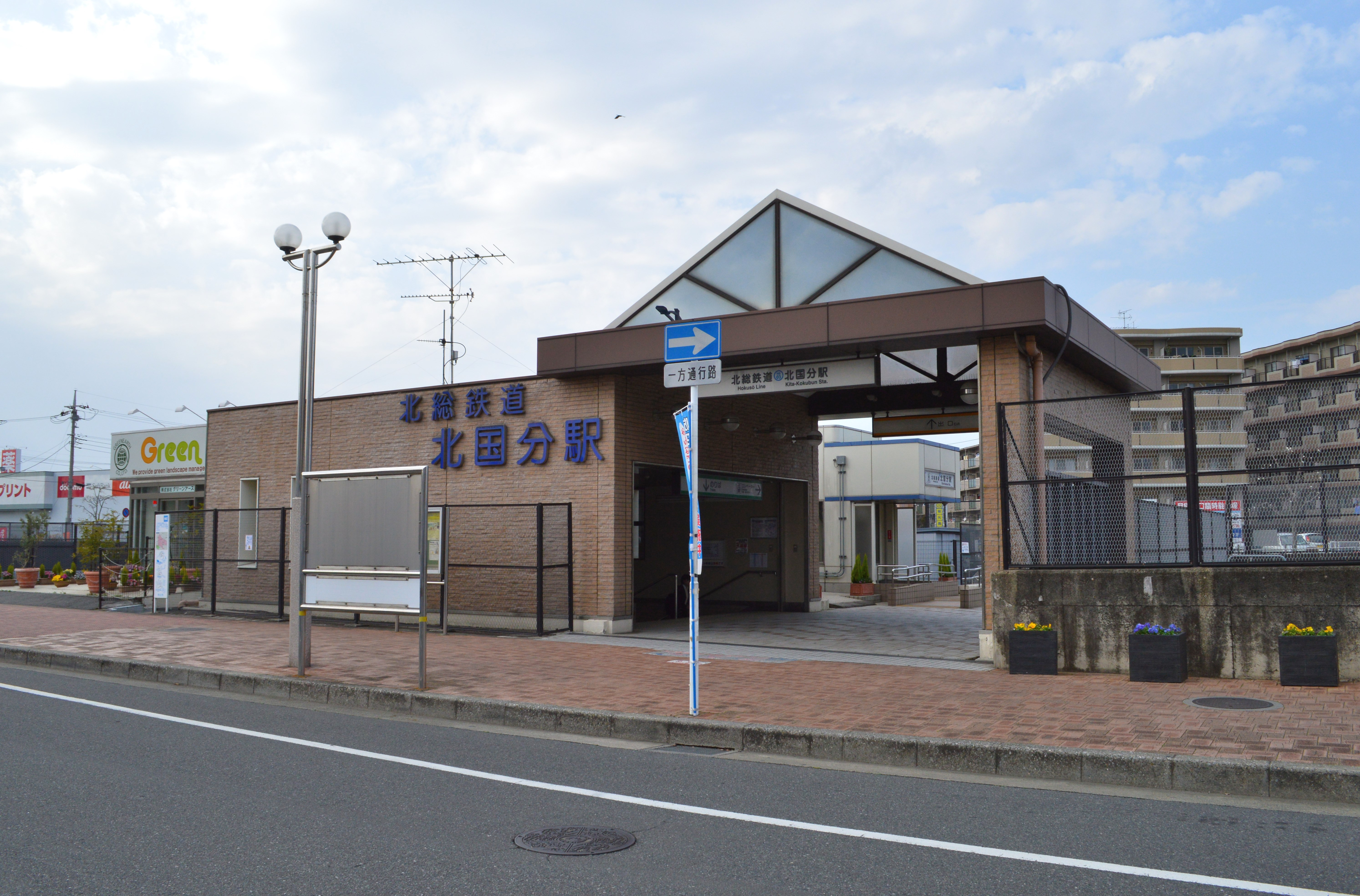
- Kita-Kokubun Station in March 2016

General information
- Location: 3-21-1 Horinouchi, Ichihara-shi, Chiba-ken 272-0837; Japan
- Coordinates: 35.7627°N 139.9143°E
- Operator: Hokusō Railway
- Line: Hokusō Line
- Distance: 4.7 km from Keisei-Takasago
- Platforms: 2 side platforms
- Tracks: 2

Other information
- Station code: HS03
- Website: Official website

History
- Opened: 31 March 1991

Passengers
- FY2018: 4235

Services
Preceding station	Hokusō Railway	Following station
Yagiri HS02 towards Keisei Takasago	Hokusō Line Local	Akiyama HS04 towards Imba Nihon-idai
Location
- Location within Chiba Prefecture

Kita-Kokubun Station (北国分駅, Kita-Kokubun-eki) is a passenger railway station in the city of Ichikawa, Chiba, Japan, operated by the third sector Hokusō Railway.

== Lines ==
Kita-Kokubun Station is served by the Hokusō Line and is located 4.7 kilometers from the starting point of the line at Keisei-Takasago.

== Station layout ==
This station consists of two opposing side platforms serving two tracks, located in a cutting below ground level, with the station building at ground level above.

=== Platforms ===
1	■ Hokusō Line	for Keisei-Takasago, Oshiage, Ueno, Shinagawa, and Haneda Airport Domestic Terminal
2	■ Hokusō Line	for Higashi-Matsudo, Shin-Kamagaya , Imba Nihon-idai, and Narita Airport

== History ==
Kita-Kokubun Station opened on 31 March 1991. On 17 July 2010, a station numbering system was introduced to the Hokusō Line, with the station designated HS03.

== Passenger statistics ==
In fiscal 2018, the station was used by an average of 4235 passengers daily.

== Surrounding area ==
- Ichikawa History Museum
- Chiba University – Gardening Department

== See also ==
- List of railway stations in Japan
