= Mizumoto Park =

Park and town in Katsushika, Tokyo, Japan

Coordinates: 35°47′10.8″N 139°52′9.3″E

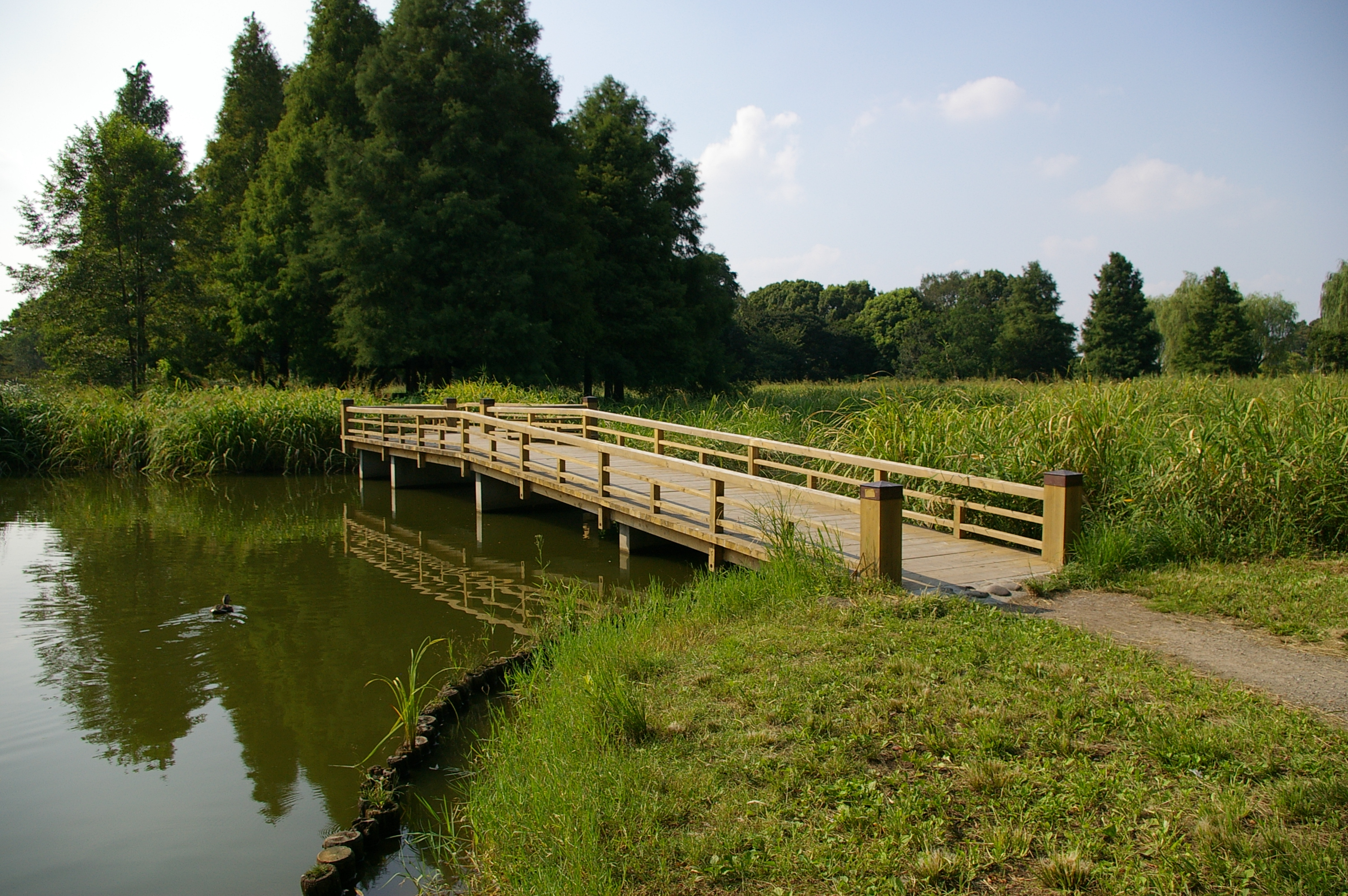
- Interactive map of Mizumoto Park
- Location: Katsushika, Tokyo and Misato, Saitama, Japan
- Area: 921,539 square metres (227.717 acres)
- Created: April 1, 1965

Mizumoto Park (水元公園, Mizumoto Kōen) is a park in Katsushika ward, Tokyo, Japan. It is the biggest park within the 23 special wards of Tokyo. It is known for its diverse plants and wild birds, and as an attraction spot during the Hanami season. Locals have said that it is home to a haunted phone booth.

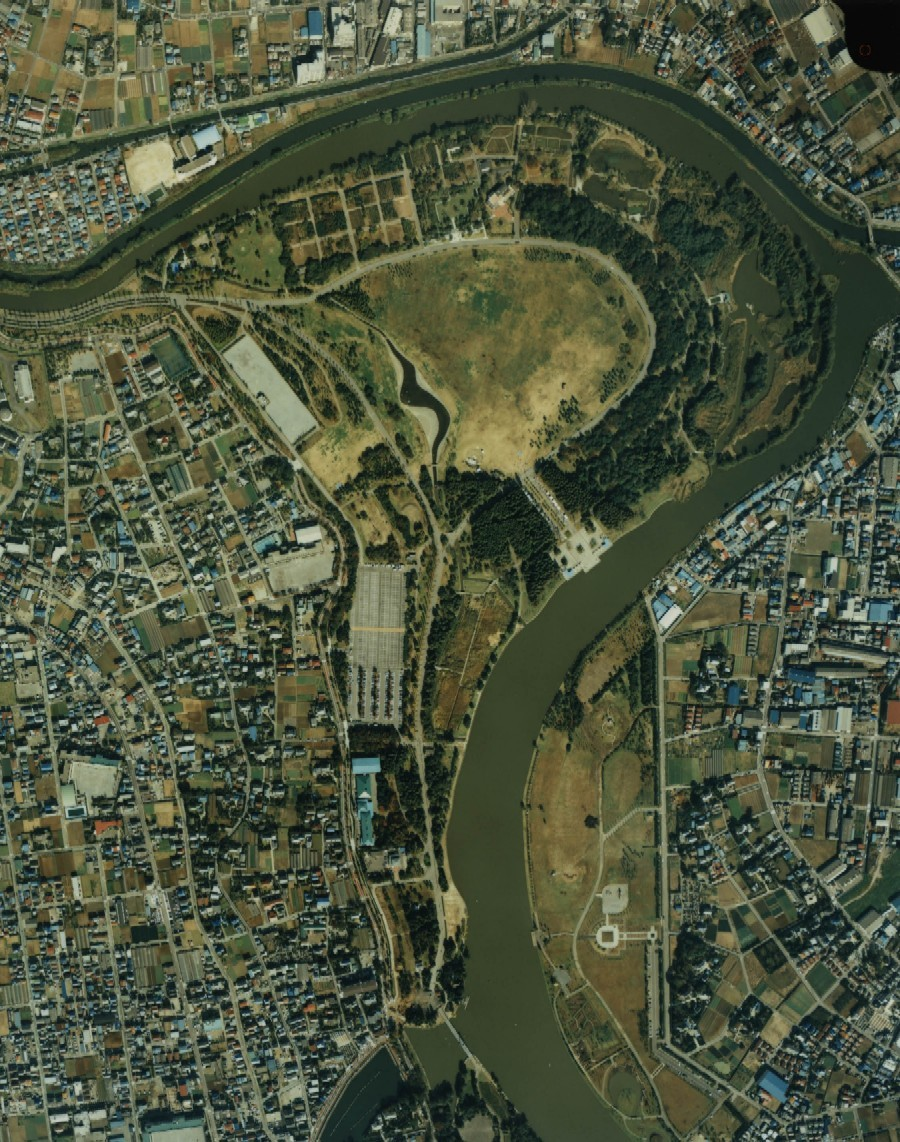
Aerial view in 1989

Inside the park, 2021

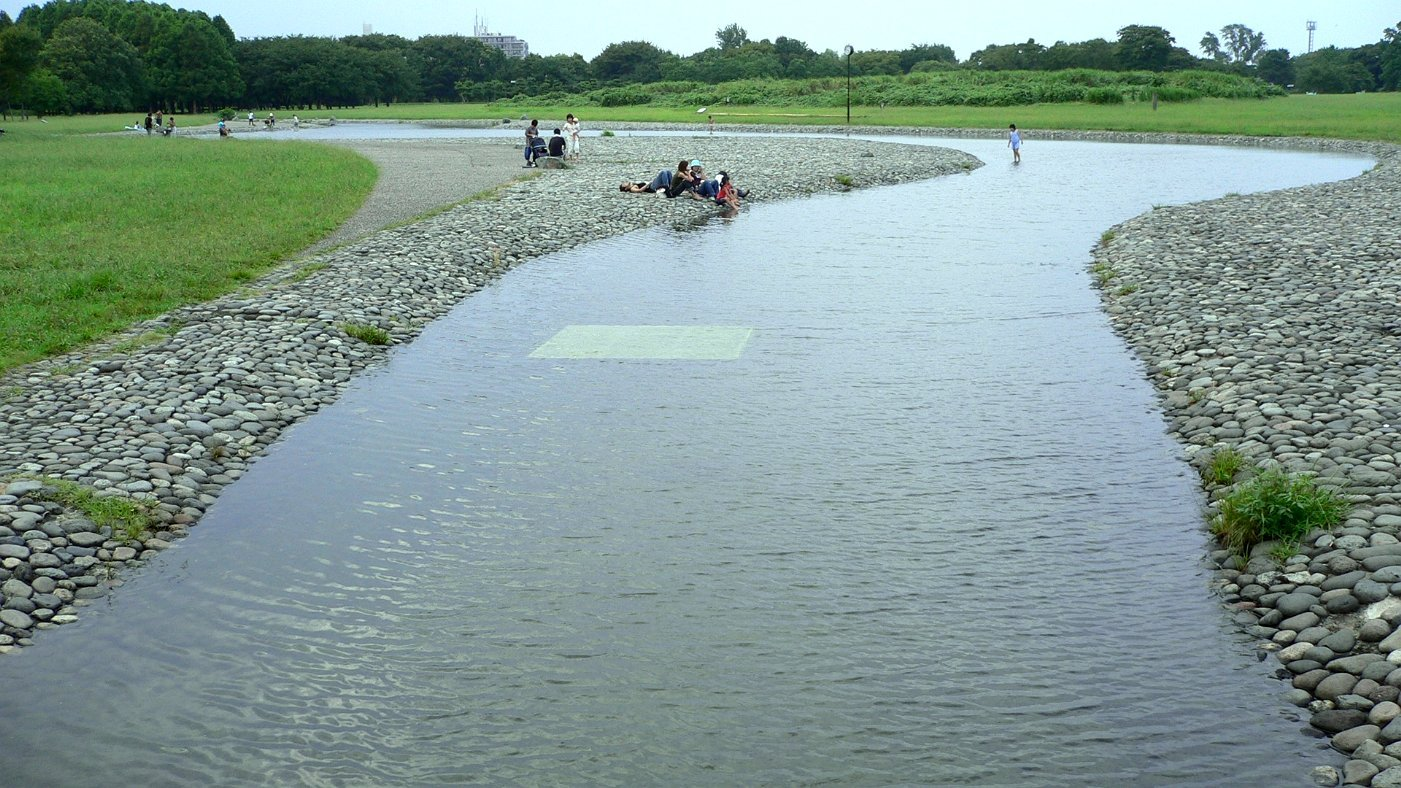
Summer, 2013

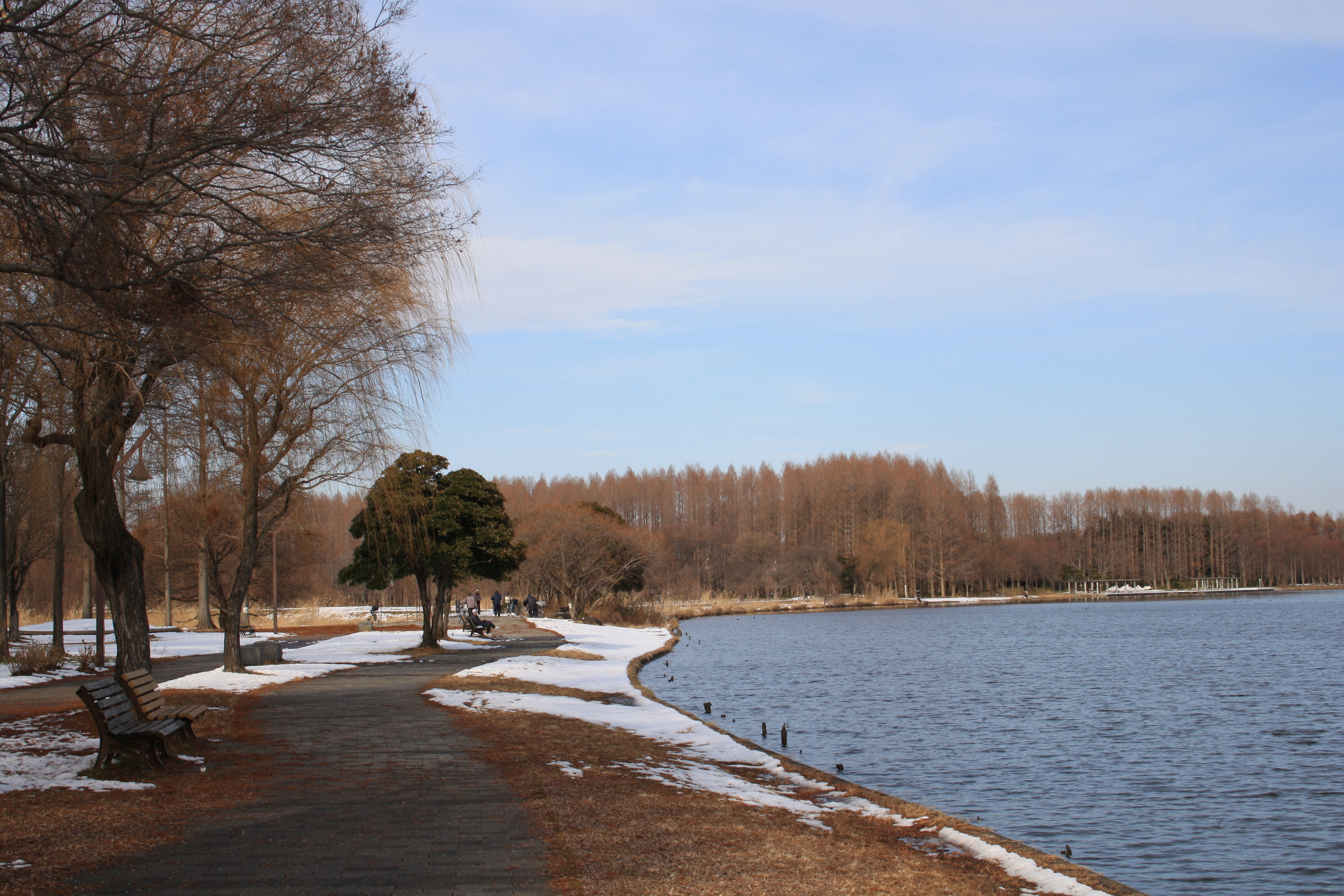
Winter, 2013

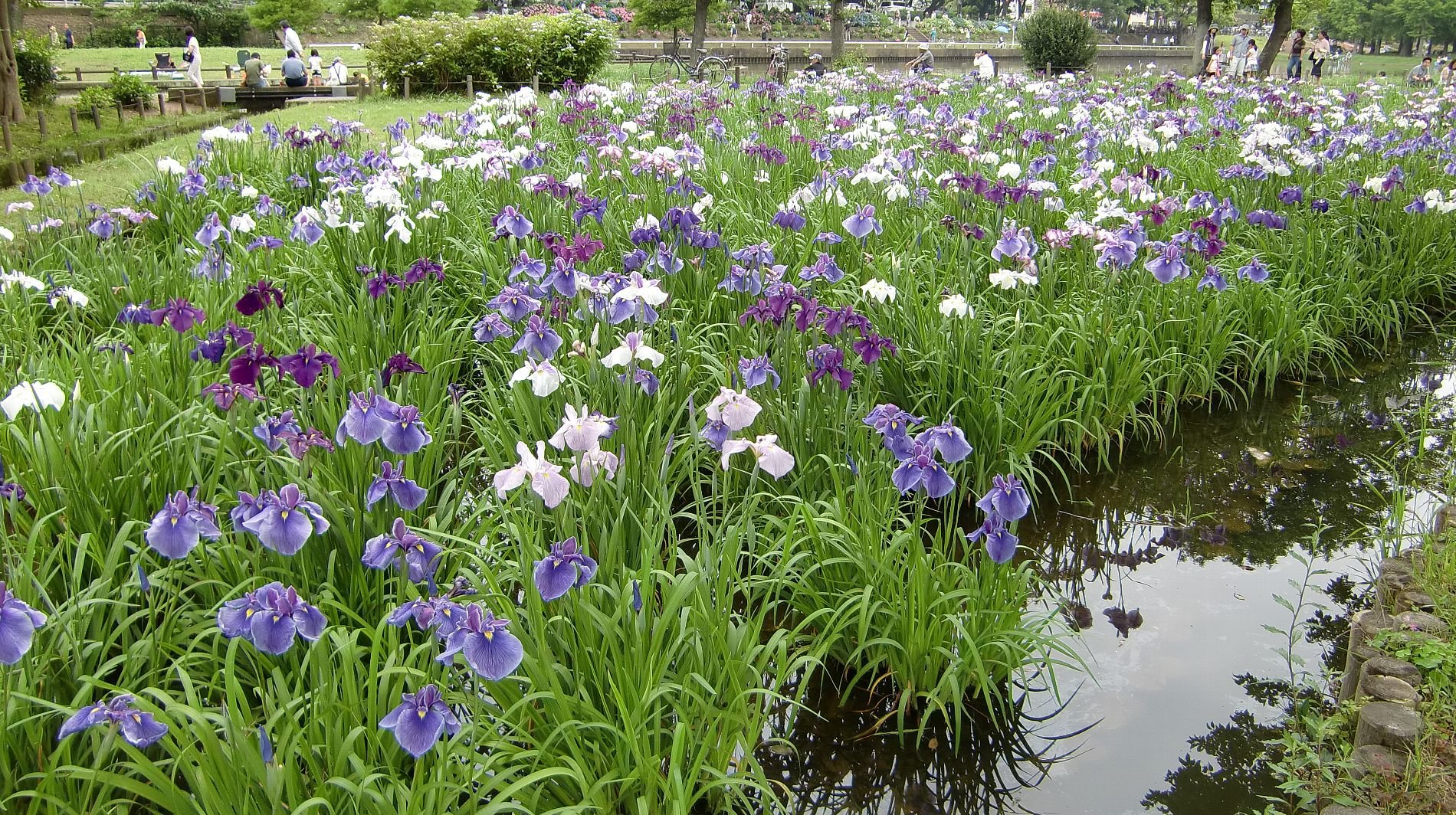
Iris Garden, 2013

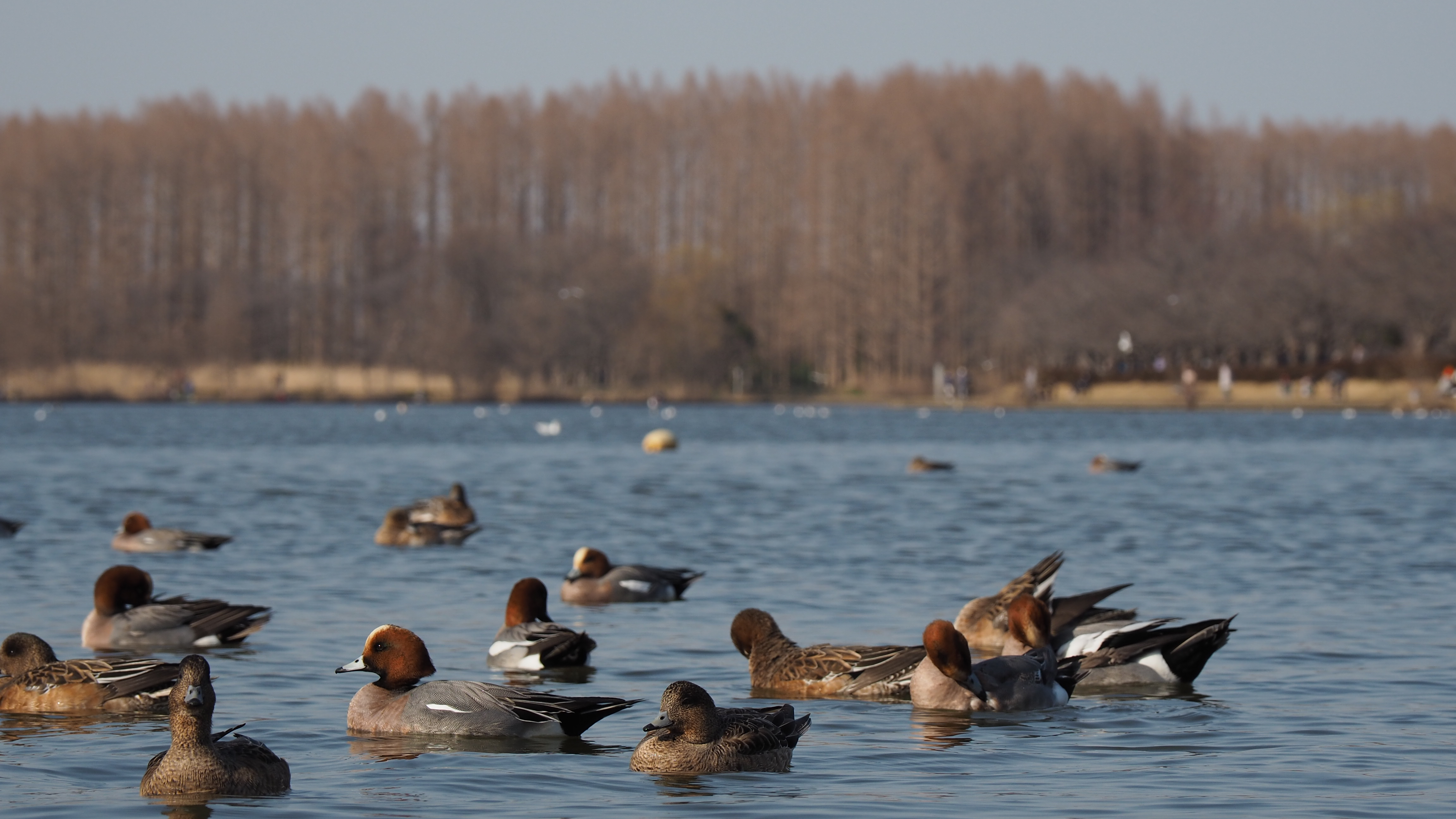
Winter, 2020

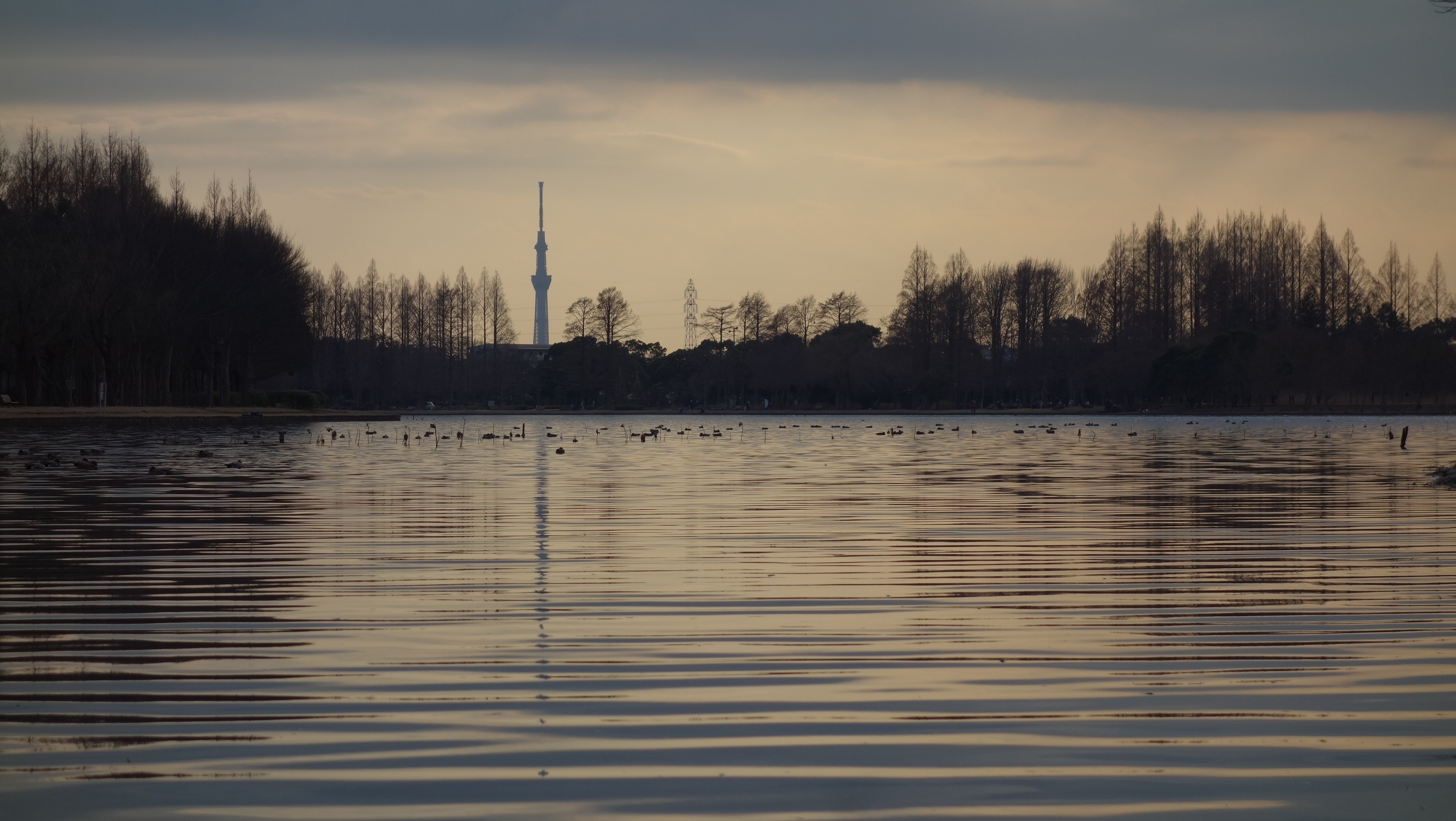
Winter, 2018

== Data ==
- Date opened: April 1, 1965
- Area: 921,539 m^{2} (227.717 acres)
- Nearest station: About 2 km (1.2 mi) from Kanamachi Station (JR Jōban Line); a bus service to the park is available.

== Festival ==
The Katsushika Iris Festival (Shōbu Matsuri) is an annual event held in Katsushika Ward, Tokyo, mainly at Horikiri Iris Garden and Mizumoto Park between late May and mid-June. During the festival, a temporary bus service operated by Keisei Bus runs on weekends and public holidays in June, linking Kanamachi Station, Shibamata Taishakuten, and Horikiri-Shōbuen Station. The fare is 220 yen.

== Education ==
Katsushika City Board of Education operates area public elementary and junior high schools.

2-8-ban are zoned to Higashi-Mizumoto Elementary School (東水元小学校) while 1-ban is zoned to Handa Elementary School (半田小学校).

3-8-ban are zoned to Mizumoto Junior High School (水元中学校) while 1-2-ban are zoned to Higashi Kanamachi Junior High School (東金町中学校).
