= Keisei Kanamachi Line =

Railway line in Tokyo, Japan

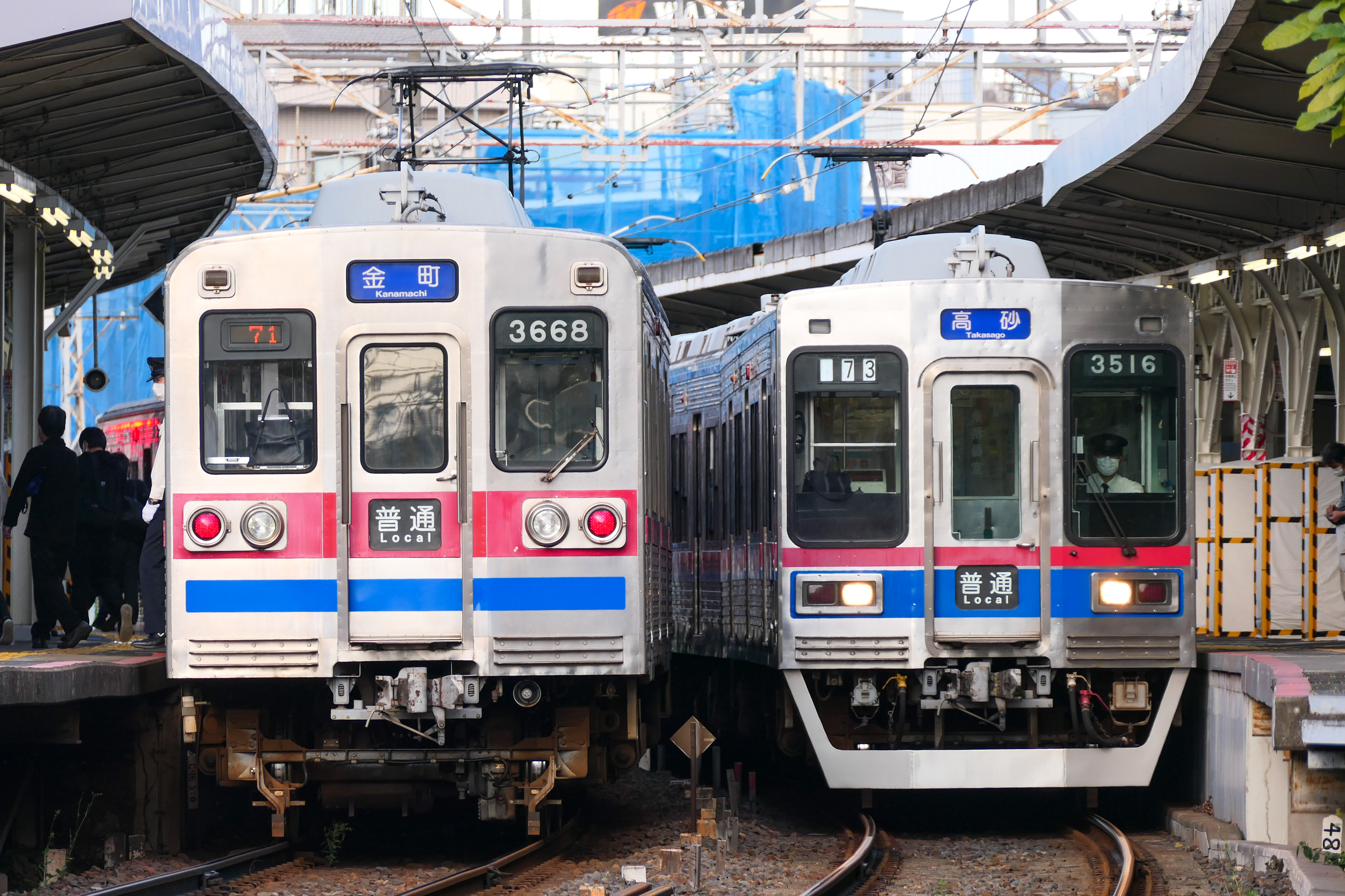
- 3500 Series set (right) and 3600 series set (left) on the Kanamachi Line in October 2020

Overview
- Owner: Keisei Electric Railway
- Locale: Katsushika City, Tokyo
- Termini: Keisei-Takasago; Keisei Kanamachi
- Stations: 3

History
- Opened: 21 October 1913; 113 years ago

Technical
- Line length: 2.5 km (1.6 mi)
- Num of tracks: 1
- Track gauge: 1,435 mm (4 ft 8 1/2 in) standard gauge
- Minimum radius: 160 m (520 ft)
- Electrification: Overhead line, 1,500 V DC
- Operating speed: 85 km/h (53 mph)
- Signalling: Automatic closed block
- Train protection system: C-ATS

The Keisei Kanamachi Line (Japanese: 京成金町線, Hepburn: Keisei-Kanamachi sen) is a 2.5-kilometre (1.6 mi) railway line in Katsushika, Tokyo, Japan, operated by the Keisei Electric Railway. The line services visitors to the Shibamata Taishakuten, a Buddhist temple founded in 1629, as well as the surrounding suburbs. The station numbering letter initial for this line is KS.

== Description ==
The Keisei Kanamachi Line is one of the few single-tracked passenger lines in Tokyo. The line is built in a packed residential area, and buildings are located very close to the track. In between Shibamata and Keisei Kanamachi Station, the track runs parallel to the street of Shibamata and is perfectly straight. There are only 3 stations on the line, and the only intermediate station, Shibamata Station, is close to the Shibamata Taishakuten and Katsushika Shibamata Torasan Memorial, thus being used often by tourists. Although being a very short line, it connects the Keisei Main Line, Keisei Sky Access Line, Hokuso Line and JR Joban Line together, and it is connected to the city center at both stations at both ends, so the line is crowded with commuters both up and down in the morning and evening.

== History ==
The first railway on this alignment was a 610 mm (2 ft) gauge human powered line opened in 1899. It had 64 carriages, each seating six passengers and pushed by one person.

The Keisei company acquired the line in 1912 and rebuilt it as an electrified 1,372 mm (4 ft 6 in) gauge line. The line was regauged to 1,435 mm (4 ft 8 1/2 in) standard gauge in 1959.

== Stations ==
No.	Station	Distance in km (mi)		Transfers	Location
No.	Station	Between stations	Total	Transfers	Location
KS10	Keisei-Takasago 京成高砂	—N/a	0 (0)	Keisei Main Line; Narita Sky Access Line; Hokusō Line	Katsushika, Tokyo
KS50	Shibamata 柴又	1.0 (0.62)	1.0 (0.62)		Katsushika, Tokyo
KS51	Keisei-Kanamachi 京成金町	1.5 (0.93)	2.5 (1.6)	Jōban Line (Local) (Kanamachi: JL21)	Katsushika, Tokyo
