= Kanamachi Station =

Railway station in Tokyo, Japan

Coordinates: 35.7697°N 139.8704°E

JL21 Kanamachi Station 金町駅
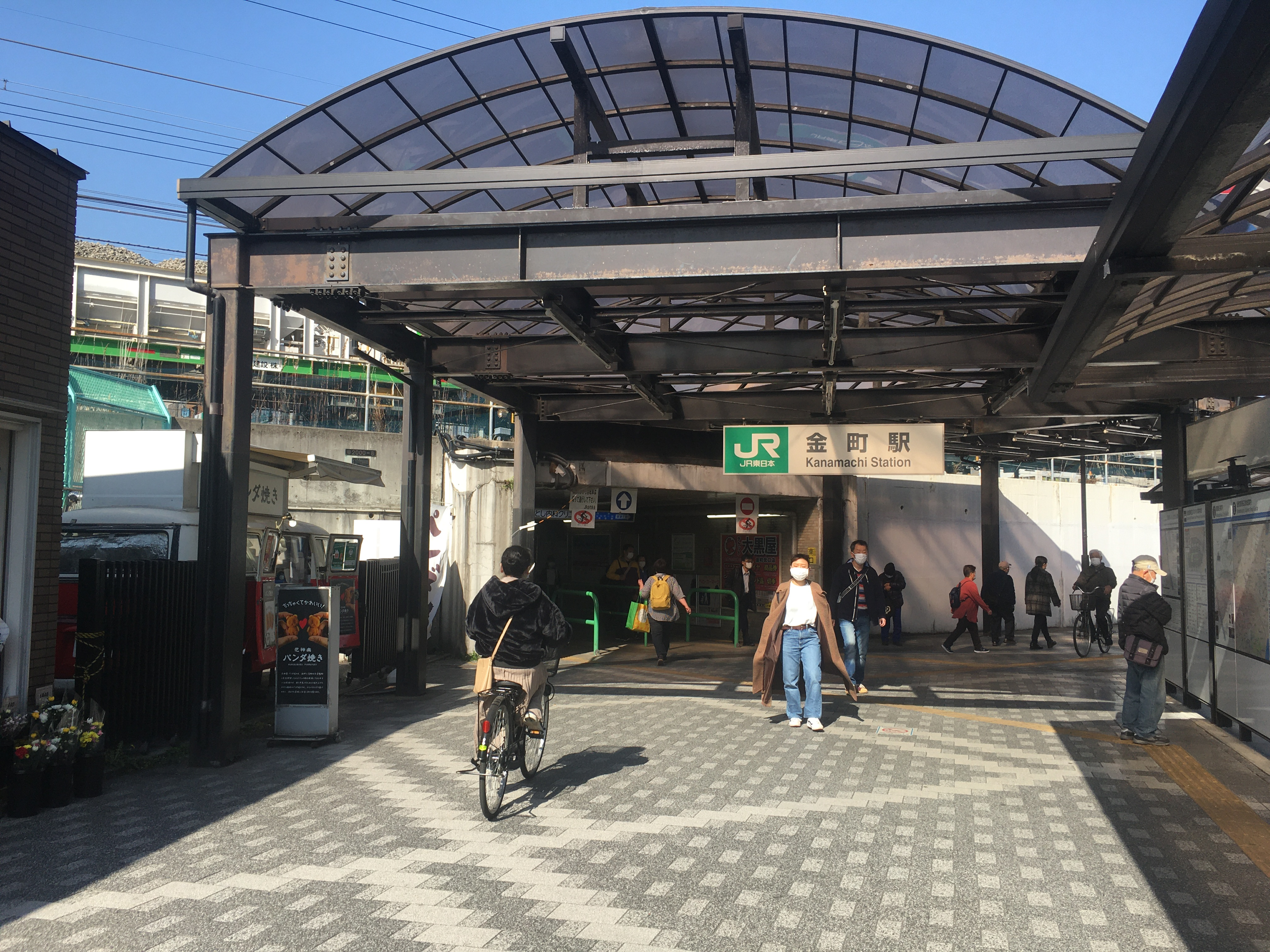
- The south entrance in March 2021

General information
- Location: 6 Kanamachi, Katsushika-ku, Tokyo; Japan
- Operator: JR East
- Line: Jōban Line (Local)
- Platforms: 1 island platform
- Connections: KS51 Keisei Kanamachi Station; Bus stop

Other information
- Station code: JL21

History
- Opened: 1897

Passengers
- FY2010: 43,971 daily

Services
Preceding station	JR East	Following station
Kameari JL20 towards Ayase	Jōban Line (Local) Local-Kankō	Matsudo JL22 towards Toride
Location
- Location within Tokyo

Kanamachi Station (金町駅, Kanamachi-eki) is a railway station on the Jōban Line in Katsushika, Tokyo, Japan, operated by East Japan Railway Company (JR East). The station is adjacent to Keisei Kanamachi Station operated by the Keisei Electric Railway.

== Lines ==
Kanamachi Station is served by Jōban Line local services with through services to and from the Tokyo Metro Chiyoda Line.

== Station layout ==
The station consists of an island platform serving two tracks for local services. There are also two tracks for Rapid services and three for freight services.

The station has a Midori no Madoguchi ticket office and a View Plaza travel agency.

=== Platforms ===
1	Jōban Line (Local)	for Matsudo, Kashiwa, Abiko, and Toride
2	Jōban Line (Local)	for Ayase; Tokyo Metro Chiyoda Line for Kita-senju, Nishi-nippori and Yoyogi-uehara

== History ==
Kanamachi Station opened on 27 December 1897.

== Passenger statistics ==
In fiscal 2010, the station was used by an average of 43,971 passengers daily (boarding passengers only).

== Surrounding area ==
- Keisei Kanamachi Station (Keisei Kanamachi Line)
- Mizumoto Park
- Edogawa River
- National Route 6

== See also ==
- List of railway stations in Japan
