= Shibamata =

Town in Katsushika, Tokyo, Japan

Shibamata 柴又
- Town block
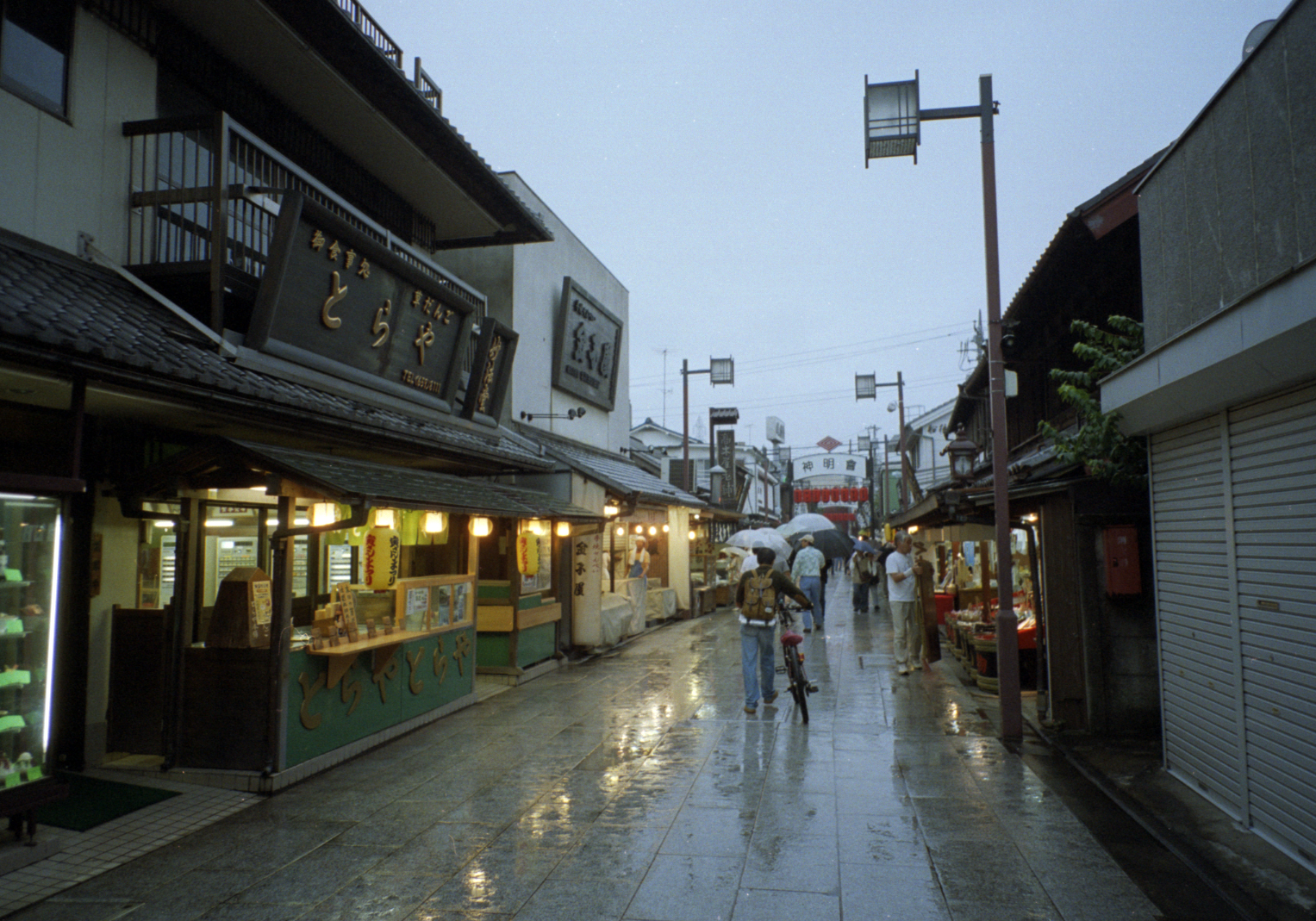
- Shibamata in 2008

- Location within Special wards of Tokyo Location within Tokyo Location within Japan
- Coordinates: 35°45′31″N 139°52′42″E
- Country: Japan
- City: Tokyo
- Ward: Katsushika

Area
  - Total: 1.74 km^{2} (0.67 sq mi)

Population (2023)
  - Total: 22,907
  - Urban density: 13,164.9/km^{2} (34,097/sq mi)
- Postal code: 125-0052
- Area code: +81 03

Shibamata (Japanese: 柴又) is a town block in Katsushika Ward, Tokyo. The current addresses within the neighbourhood are Shibamata 1 to 7 chome. The neighbourhood is the family home of Tora-san in the Otoko wa Tsurai yo film series. Attractions include the Shibamata Taishakuten Buddhist temple.

== See also ==
- Shibamata Station
- Murder of Junko Kobayashi
