= Shibamata Station =

Railway station in Tokyo, Japan

Coordinates: 35.7561°N 139.8750°E

KS50 Shibamata Station 柴又駅
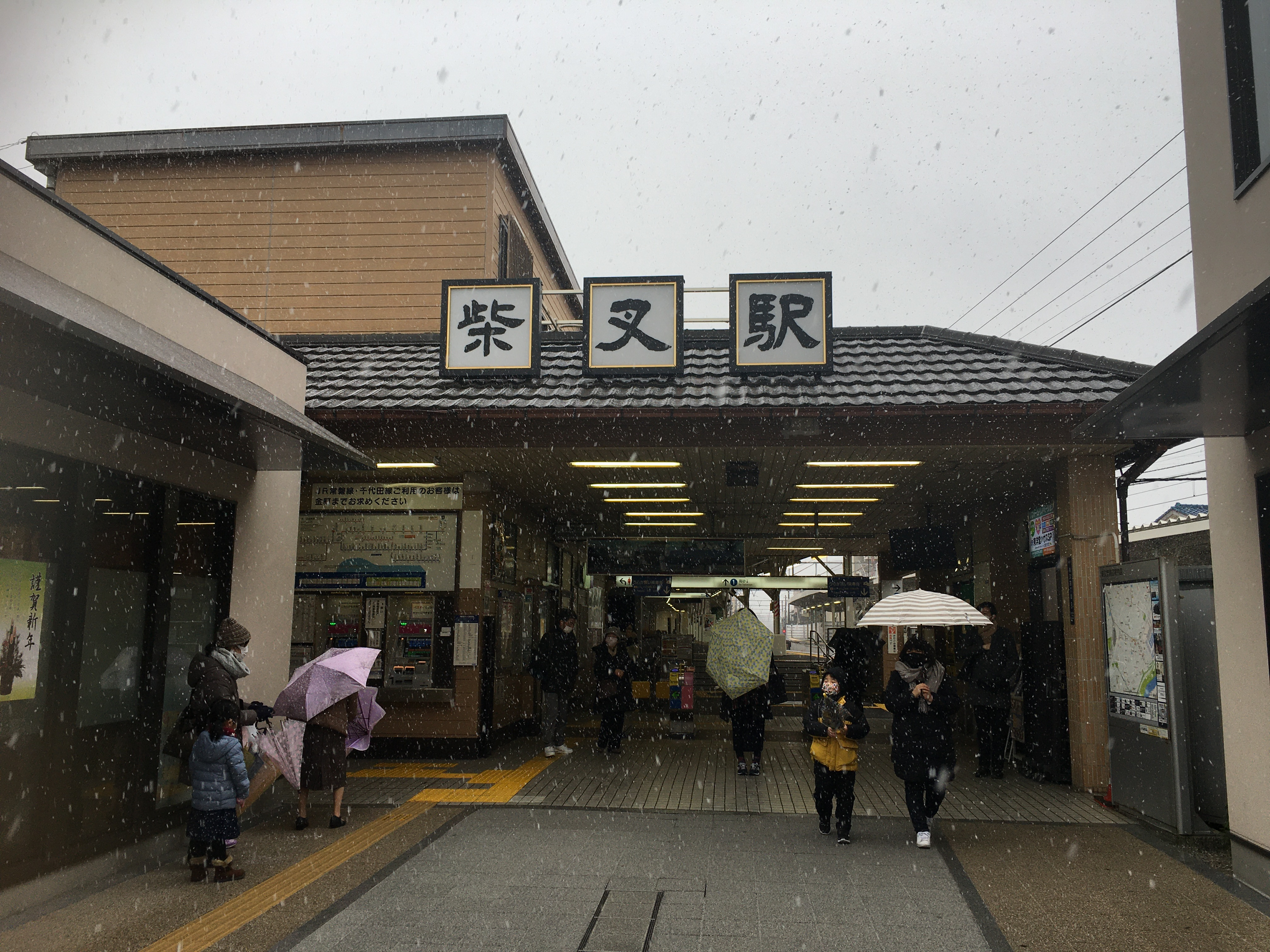
- The station entrance on a snowy day in January 2022

General information
- Location: 4-8-14 Shibamata, Katsushika, Tokyo （東京都葛飾区柴又四丁目8-14） Japan
- Operator: Keisei Electric Railway
- Line: Keisei Kanamachi Line

Construction
- Structure type: Ground level
- Accessible: Ramps to platform level

Other information
- Station code: KS50

History
- Opened: 1912

Passengers
- FY2009: 10,153 daily

Services
Preceding station	Keisei	Following station
Keisei Takasago KS10 Terminus	Kanamachi Line	Keisei Kanamachi KS51 Terminus
Location

Shibamata Station (柴又駅, Shibamata-eki) is a railway station on the Keisei Kanamachi Line in Shibamata, Katsushika, Tokyo, Japan, operated by the private railway operator Keisei Electric Railway.

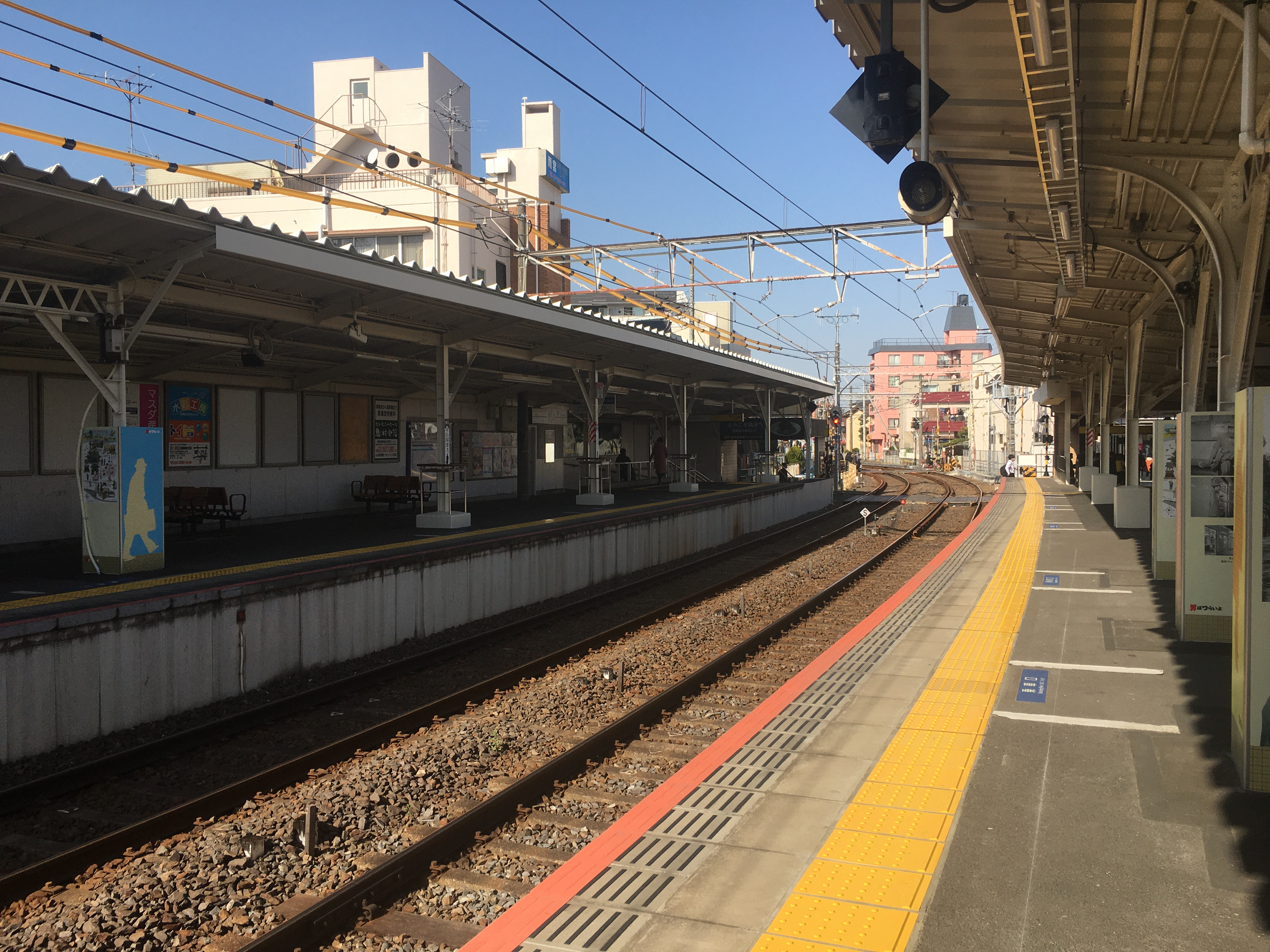
Station platforms, 2021

== Lines ==
Shibamata Station is served by the Keisei Kanamachi Line.

== Station layout ==
This station consists of two opposed side platforms serving two tracks.

== History ==
The Station opened on 3 November 1912.

Station numbering was introduced to all Keisei Line stations on 17 June 2010. Shibamata was assigned station number KS50.

== Surrounding area ==
In front of the station, there is a bronze statue of actor Kiyoshi Atsumi as Tora-san, the main character of the Otoko wa Tsurai yo film and TV series. The statue was erected in 1999, after the death of Atsumi, and the end of the Series.

Most of the series took place in Shibamata, and the Statue has become a hotspot for tourists who are fans of the series.

- Shibamata Taishakuten
- Edogawa River

== See also ==
- List of railway stations in Japan
