= Murder of Junko Kobayashi =

1996 Japanese murder case

Junko Kobayashi
- 小林 順子
- Born: Before 9 September 1975; Japan
- Died: 9 September 1996 (aged 21); Shibamata, Katsushika Ward, Tokyo, Japan
- Cause of death: Murder (stabbing)
- Occupation: 4th Year University Student

Murder of Junko Kobayashi
- Location: Japan
- Date: 9 September 1996
- Attack type: Murder
- Weapon: Knife (8cm blade)
- Victims: Junko Kobayashi, aged 21
- Perpetrator: Unknown

Junko Kobayashi (Japanese: 小林 順子, romanized: Kobayashi Junko; 1975 – 9 September 1996) was a female Japanese university student who was murdered inside her own house in Shibamata, Tokyo on 9 September 1996. Her house was subsequently set on fire and burned down. The official case name given by the Tokyo Metropolitan Police Department is "The murder-arson case of a Shibamata 3-chome Female College Student" (柴又三丁目女子大生殺人・放火事件). The investigation continues till this day, but the case remains unsolved.

== Murder ==
At around 4:30 pm on 9 September 1996, a fire broke out in a private house in Shibamata 3-chome, Katsushika-ku, Tokyo. The fire was extinguished about two hours later, and the body of a female university student (21 years old at the time), a fourth year student at Sophia University, was found in the burnt ruins. The victim was preparing to study abroad in the USA two days later. The body was bound with adhesive tape over the mouth and hands, and pantyhose over the legs, and the neck was stabbed with a sharp blade, so the police ruled it a murder case.

On the day of the incident, it had been raining intermittently since the morning and started to fall harder after midday, becoming even heavier after 15:00 hrs. Shortly before 15:50, the victim came downstairs from her room to go to the bathroom. She asked her mother, who was getting ready to go to work, "Are you going out on your bicycle even though it's raining like this?" This was the last conversation they had.

- 15:50 - The mother left the house for work and left the front door unlocked.
- 16:15 - Neighbourhood passer-by said there was no fire.
- 16:35 - Fire started.
- 16:39 - Neighbour calls 119.
- around 18:00 - The interior is completely destroyed and the fire is finally extinguished.

Firefighters found the victim on the second floor and immediately took her to the hospital, where she was pronounced dead on arrival due to blood loss from stabbing. Investigators determined Junko Kobayashi had been dead before the fire started, due to lack of smoke particles in her lungs.

=== Crime scene ===
The victim was lying on her side on her father's duvet in her parents' bedroom on the second floor, with a summer quilt over her head. The left and right edges of the duvet were tucked under her body. The victim was stabbed intensively in six places on the right side of her neck and bled to death. Her mouth was covered with adhesive tape. Both arms were also bound with adhesive tape. There were several wounds on her hands, which appeared to have been caused by considerable resistance, and adhesive tape was wrapped over them, so it is believed that her hands were bound after the killing. Her legs were tied in a karage knot with stockings. Karage knots are used in landscaping, scaffolding, kimono dressing, stage costumes, waste paper collection, electrical work and civil engineering. In the landscaping industry, it is also known as the "kagari knot". There was no disturbance of the clothing. The absence of soot on the trachea suggests that the fire was set after the murder.

A match from a Buddhist altar was used to set fire to a wardrobe in a 6-mat Japanese-style room on the east side of the first floor. A computer on the first floor was also set on fire. The father's slippers, which he usually wore and left at the front door, were left on the second floor in an assortment.

== Investigation ==
Based on the circumstances of the crime scene and the fact that Junko's father's slippers seemed to have been worn, it was thought to be the work of a known acquaintance of the victim.

In September 2006, ten years after the incident, it was disclosed that both legs had been tied in a special method known as a "karage knot" and that DNA from a non-family member was found in matchbox residue left at the scene. In September 2014, it was reported that the DNA type of the suspected murderer was detected in blood on the bedding hanging over the body on the second floor, which also matched the DNA type on the matchbox found on the first floor.

In addition, the case is subjected to a special investigation reward system (public reward system).

== Memorial ==
The building of the victim's house, the scene of the incident, no longer exists, but a jizo named after the victim is enshrined at the site.
