= Keisei Takasago Station =

Railway station in Tokyo, Japan

Coordinates: 35.750966°N 139.866927°E

KS10 Keisei Takasago Station 京成高砂駅
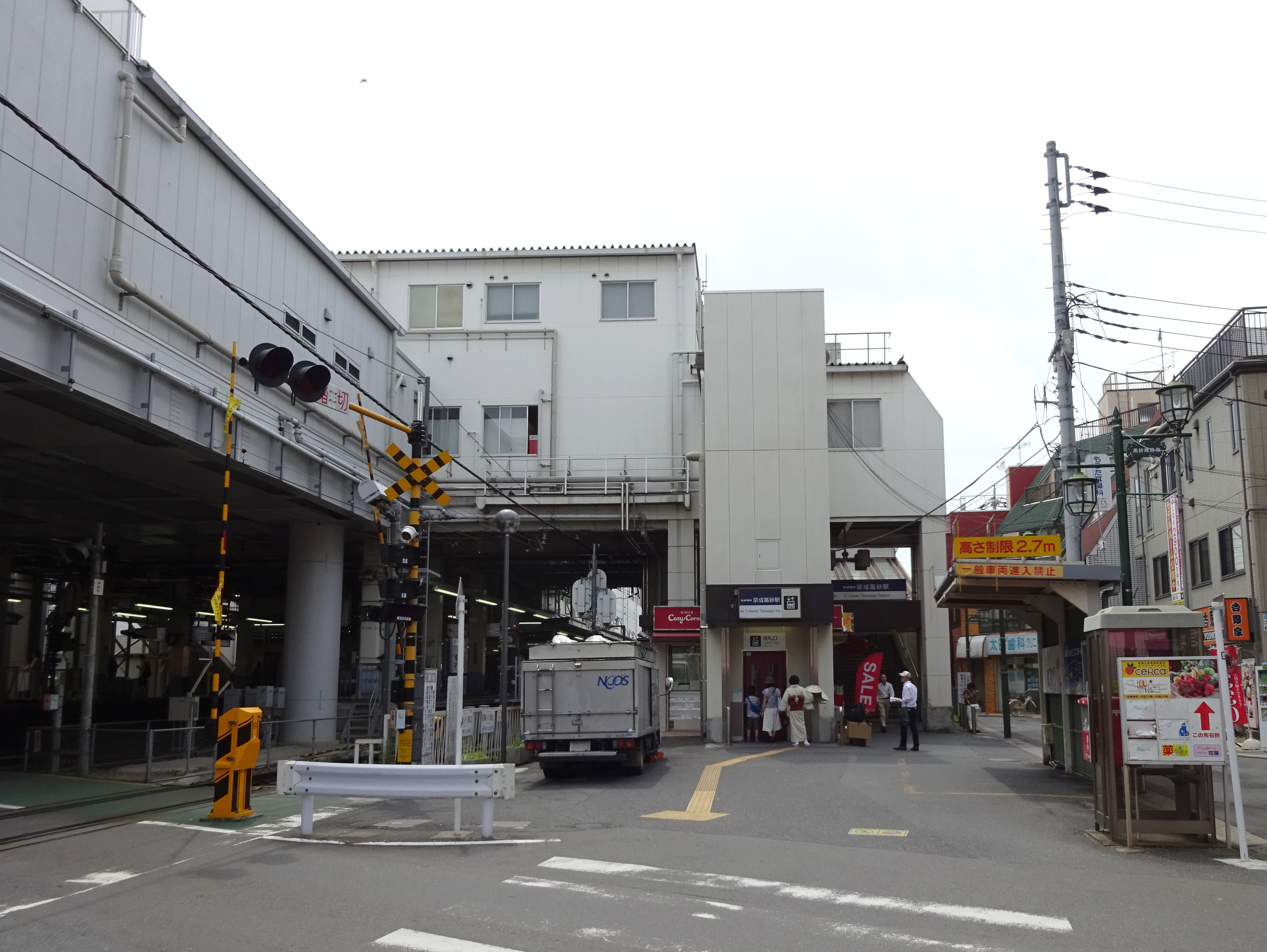
- The north entrance to the station in June 2016

General information
- Location: 5-28-1 Takasago, Katsushika-ku, Tokyo; Japan
- Operator: Keisei Electric Railway; Hokuso Railway
- Lines: Keisei Main Line; Keisei Kanamachi Line; Narita Sky Access Line; Hokuso Line
- Distance: 12.7 km from Keisei Ueno
- Platforms: 2 island platforms + 1 side platform
- Tracks: 5

Other information
- Station code: KS10

History
- Opened: 3 November 1912
- Former names: Magarikane (1912-1913); Takasago (1913-1931)

Passengers
- FY2015: 98,982 daily

Services
Preceding station	Keisei	Following station
Aoto KS09 towards Keisei Ueno	Main Line Rapid Limited Express	Keisei Yawata KS16 towards Narita Airport Terminal 1
Aoto KS09 towards Keisei Ueno	Main Line Access Express	through to Narita Sky Access Line
Aoto KS09 towards Keisei Ueno	Main Line Limited Express Commuter Express	Keisei Yawata KS16 towards Narita Airport Terminal 1
Aoto KS09 towards Keisei Ueno	Main Line Rapid Local	Keisei Koiwa KS11 towards Narita Airport Terminal 1
through to Main Line	Kanamachi Line	Shibamata KS50 towards Keisei Kanamachi
through to Main Line	Narita Sky Access Line Access Express	Higashi-Matsudo HS05 towards Narita Airport Terminal 1
Preceding station	Hokusō Railway	Following station
through to Keisei Main Line	Hokusō Line Limited Express	Higashi-Matsudo HS05 towards Imba Nihon-idai
through to Keisei Main Line	Hokusō Line Local	Shin-Shibamata HS01 towards Imba Nihon-idai
Location
- Location within Tokyo

Keisei Takasago Station (京成高砂駅, Keisei Takasago-eki) is a railway station in Katsushika, Tokyo, Japan, operated by the private railway operator Keisei Electric Railway and Hokuso Railway.

== Lines ==
Keisei Takasago Station is served by the following lines.

- Keisei Main Line
- Keisei Kanamachi Line
- Narita Sky Access Line
- Hokuso Line

It lies 12.7 km (7.9 mi) from the starting point of the Keisei Main Line at Keisei Ueno Station.

== Layout ==
There are two island platforms serving four tracks (Nos. 1–4) on the ground level and one elevated side platform (No. 5) for the Keisei Kanamachi Line. The elevated Kanamachi Line platform opened on 5 July 2010.

=== Platforms ===
1-2	Keisei Main Line	for Nippori, Keisei Ueno, and Oshiage; Toei Asakusa Line for Nihombashi and Nishi-magome; Keikyu Main Line for Haneda Airport (Terminal 3 and Terminal 1·2) and Misakiguchi
3-4	Keisei Main Line	for Keisei Funabashi, Keisei Chiba, Keisei Narita, and Narita Airport (Terminal 2·3 and Terminal 1)
3-4	Hokusō Line	for Shin-Kamagaya and Imba Nihon-idai
3-4	Narita Sky Access Line	for Shin-Kamagaya, Imba Nihon-idai, and Narita Airport
5	Keisei Kanamachi Line	for Shibamata and Keisei Kanamachi

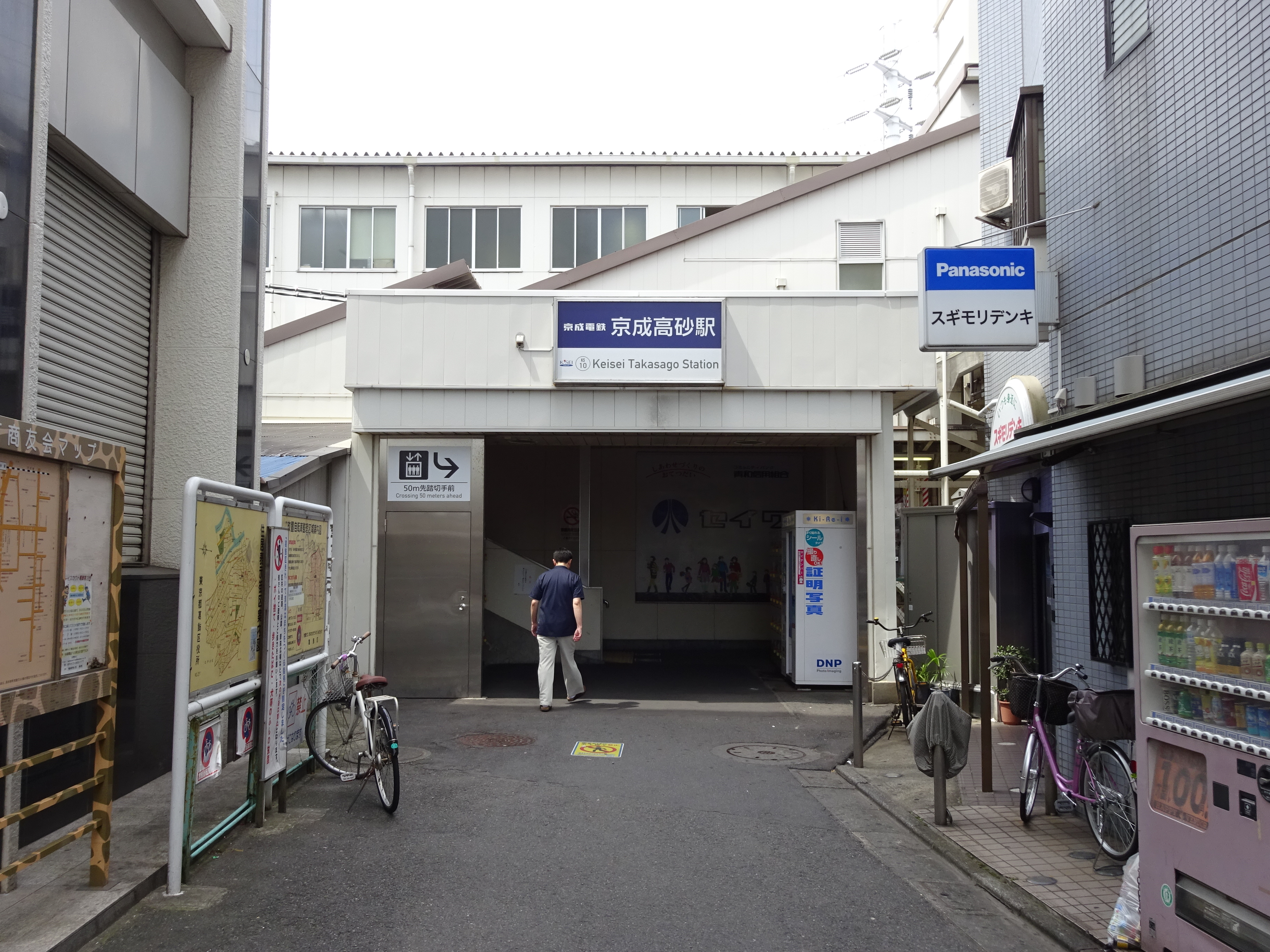
The south entrance in June 2016

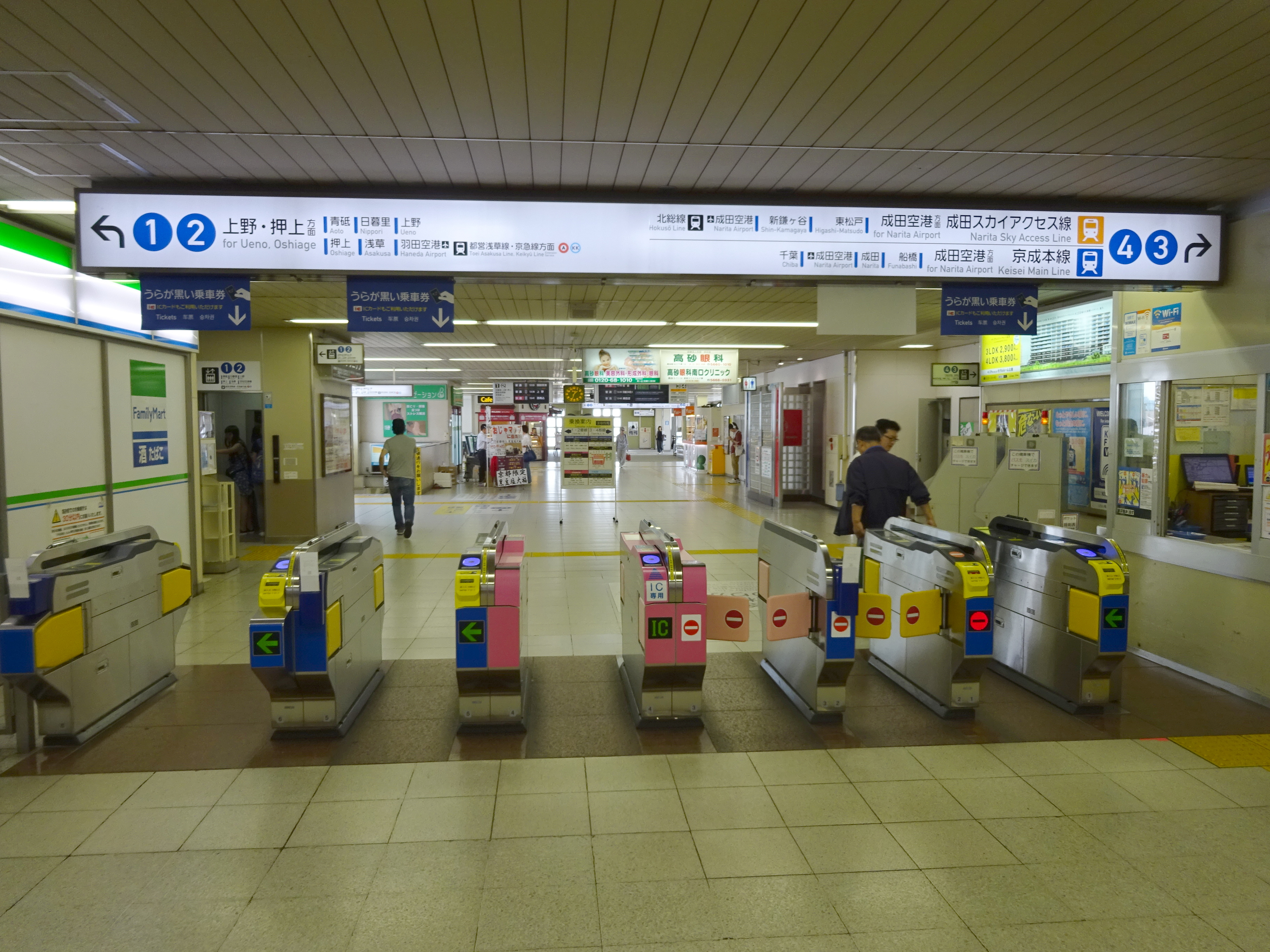
The ticket barriers in June 2016

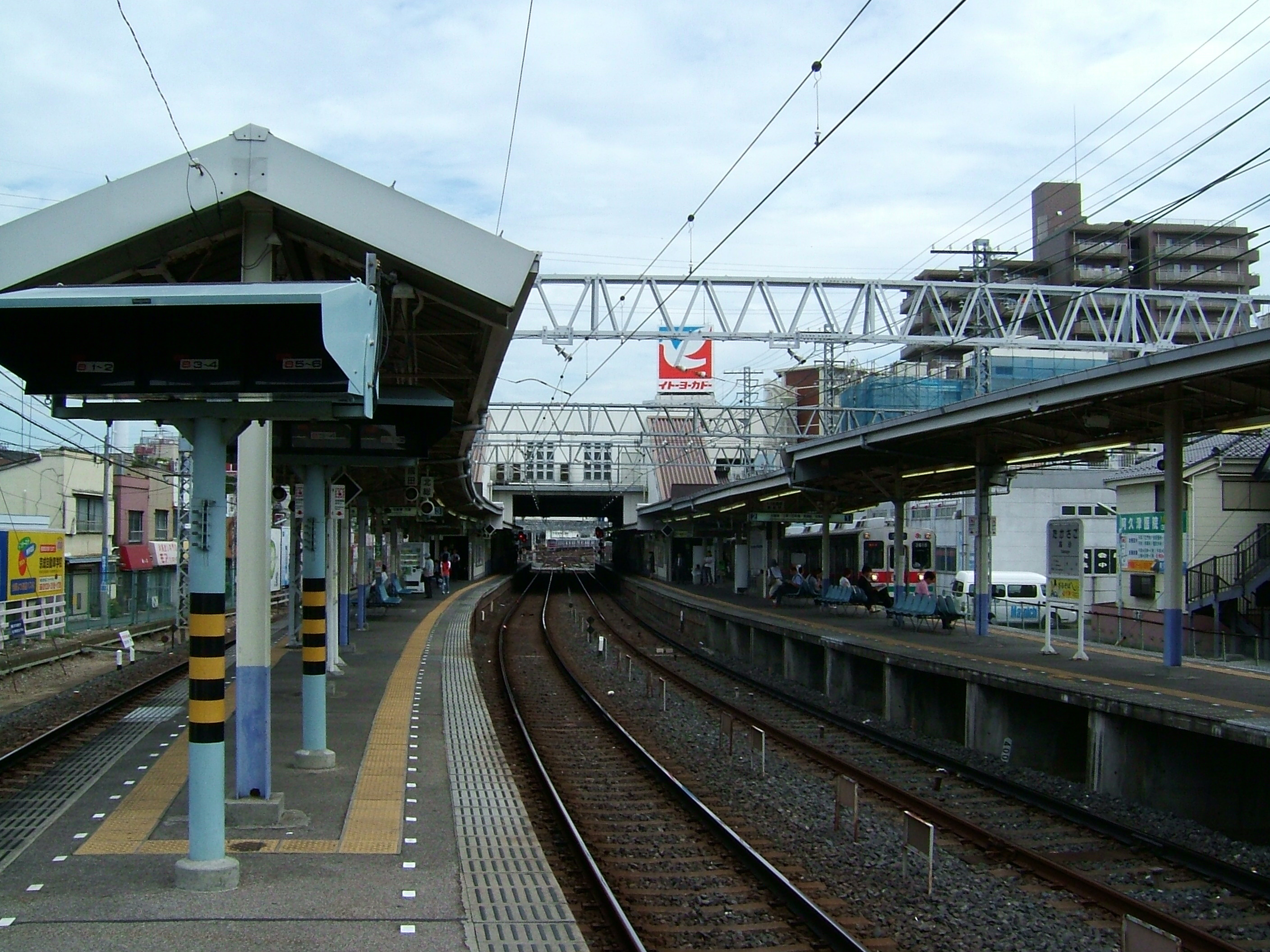
Platforms 1 to 4 in September 2004

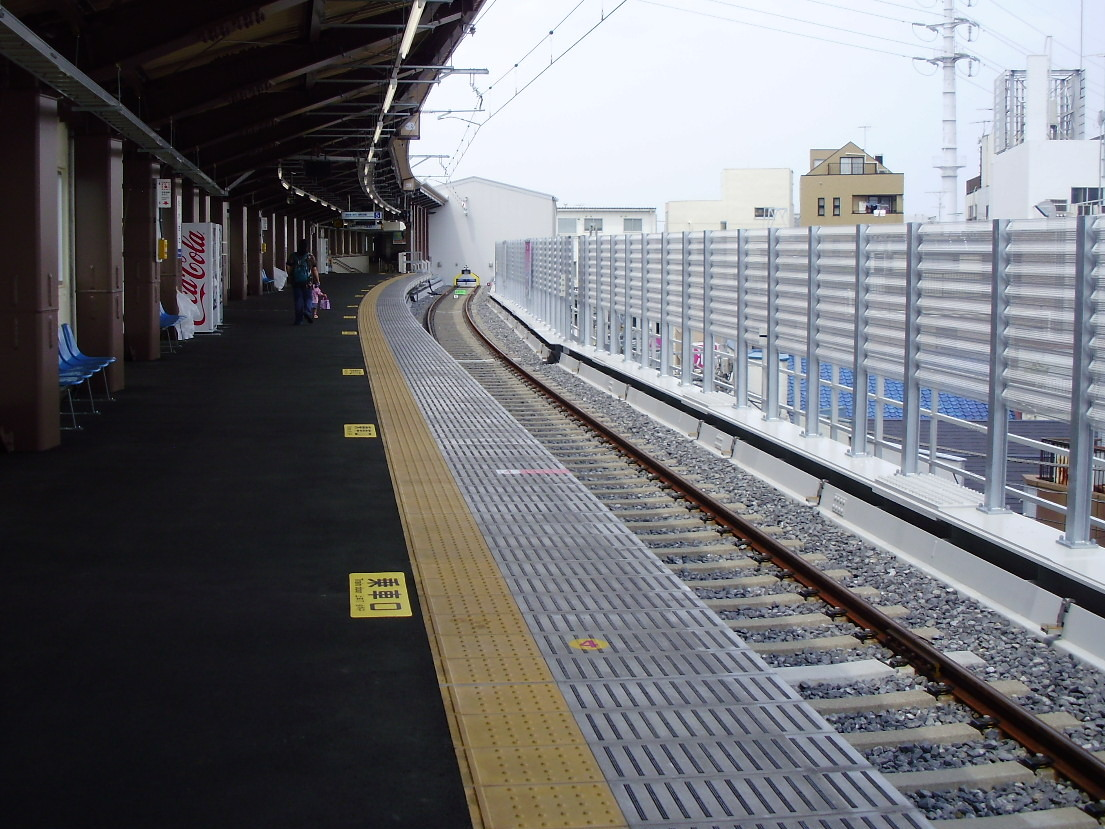
The Keisei Kanamachi Line platform (platform 5) in July 2010

== History ==
The station opened on 3 November 1912 as Magarikane Station (曲金駅). It was renamed Takasago Station (高砂駅) on 26 June 1913, and became Keisei Takasago from 18 November 1931.

The Hokuso Railway opened on 31 March 1991, and the Narita Sky Access Line opened on 17 July 2010. On the same day in 2010, station numbering was introduced to all Keisei Line stations; Keisei Takasago was assigned station number KS10.

== See also ==
- List of railway stations in Japan
