= Shibamata Taishakuten =

Kyōei-zan Daikyō-ji 経栄山 題経寺
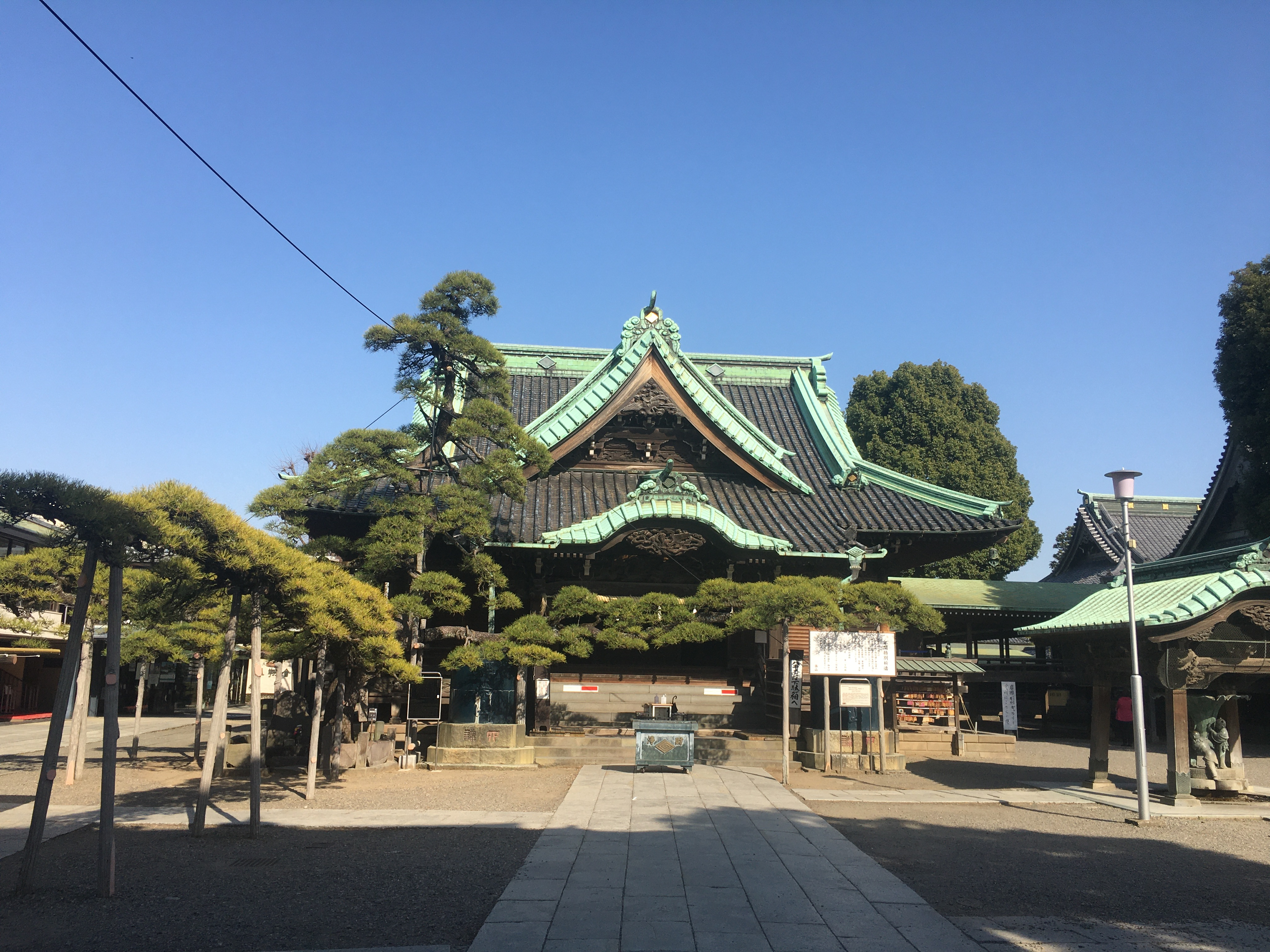

- Location within Japan

Religion
- Affiliation: Buddhist
- Sect: Nichiren-shū
- Deity: Mandala Gohonzon; Taishakuten

Location
- Location: 7-10-3 Shibamata, Katsushika, Tokyo
- Country: Japan
- Interactive map of Kyōei-zan Daikyō-ji 経栄山 題経寺
- Coordinates: 35°45′30″N 139°52′42″E

Architecture
- Founder: Nicchū, Nichiei
- Completed: 1629 (Kan'ei 6)

Website
- www.taishakuten.or.jp

Daikyō-ji (題経寺), popularly known as Shibamata Taishakuten (柴又帝釈天), is a Nichiren-shū Buddhist temple in the Shibamata neighbourhood of Katsushika, Tokyo, Japan. Founded in 1629, the main image is of Taishakuten. In 1996 the Ministry of the Environment designated the temple and its ferryboat as one of the 100 Soundscapes of Japan. In 2009 the temple and its ferryboat were selected as one of the 100 Landscapes of Japan (Heisei era).

== Access ==
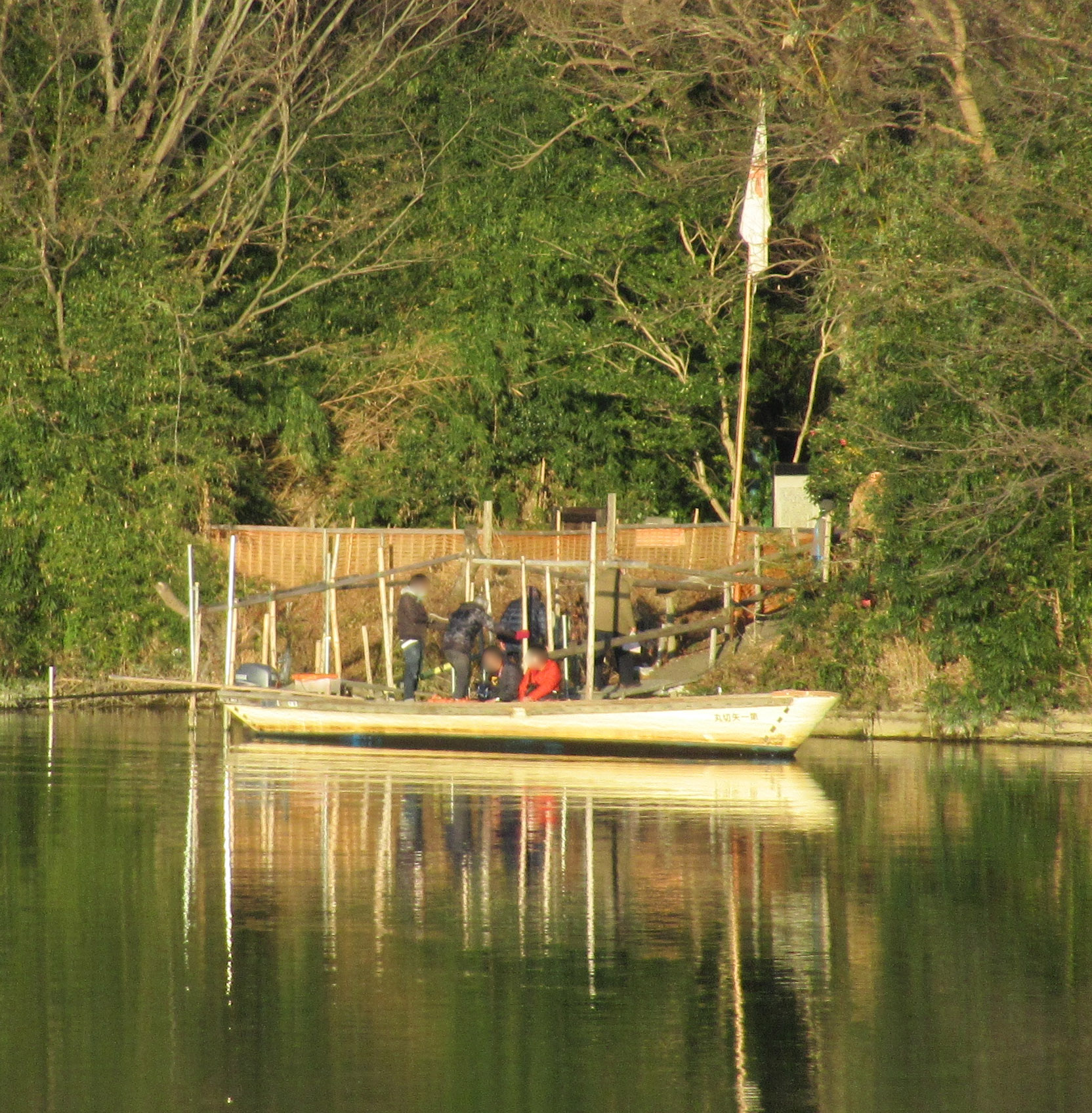
A boat which is named as Daiichi Yagiri-maru of Yagiri no Watashi

=== Yagiri-no-Watashi ===
It costs 200 yen to travel from Shibamata Taishakuten to Yagiri-no-Watashi iriguchi bus stop for 5 minutes.

== Gallery ==
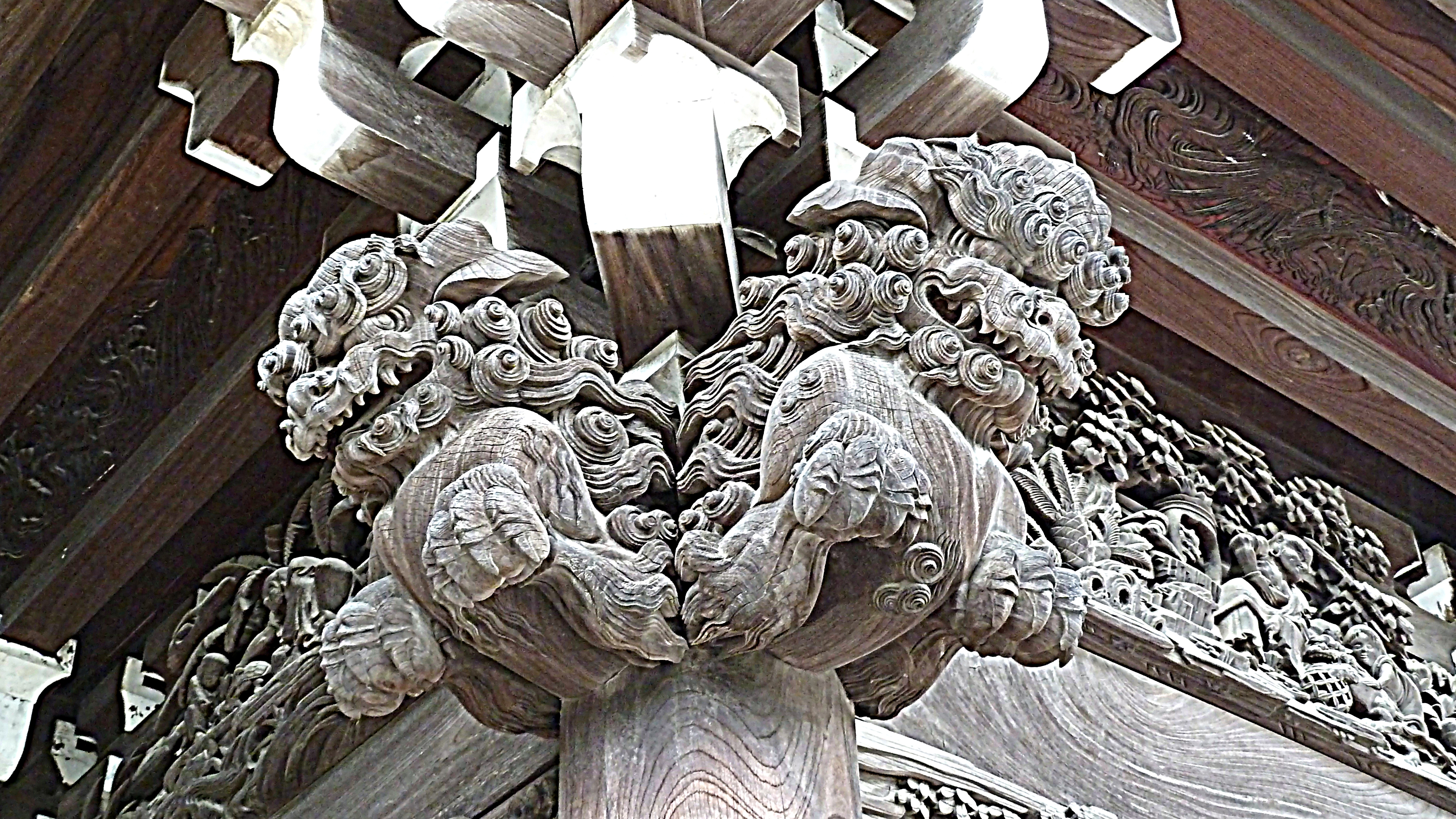

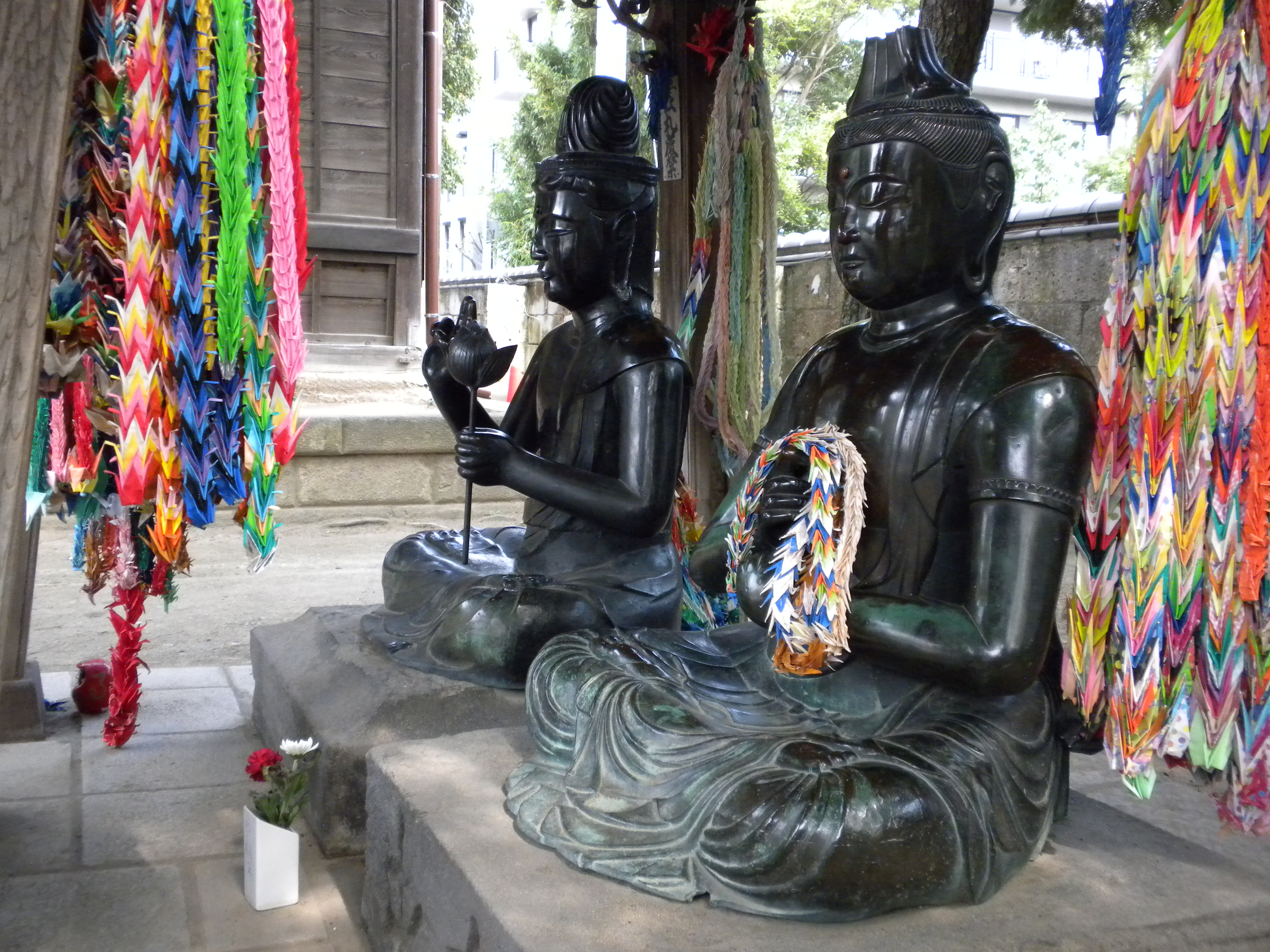
Guanyin

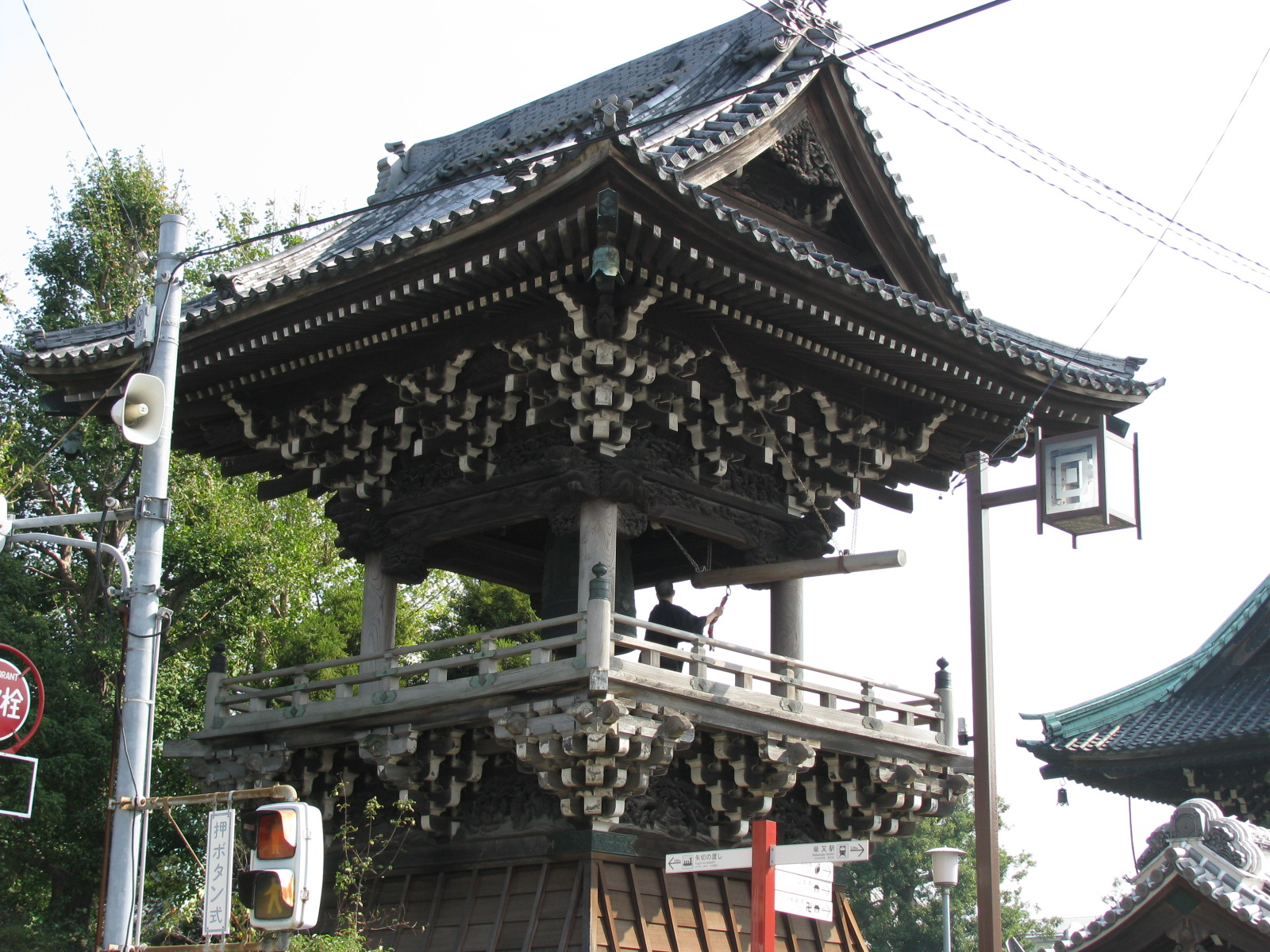

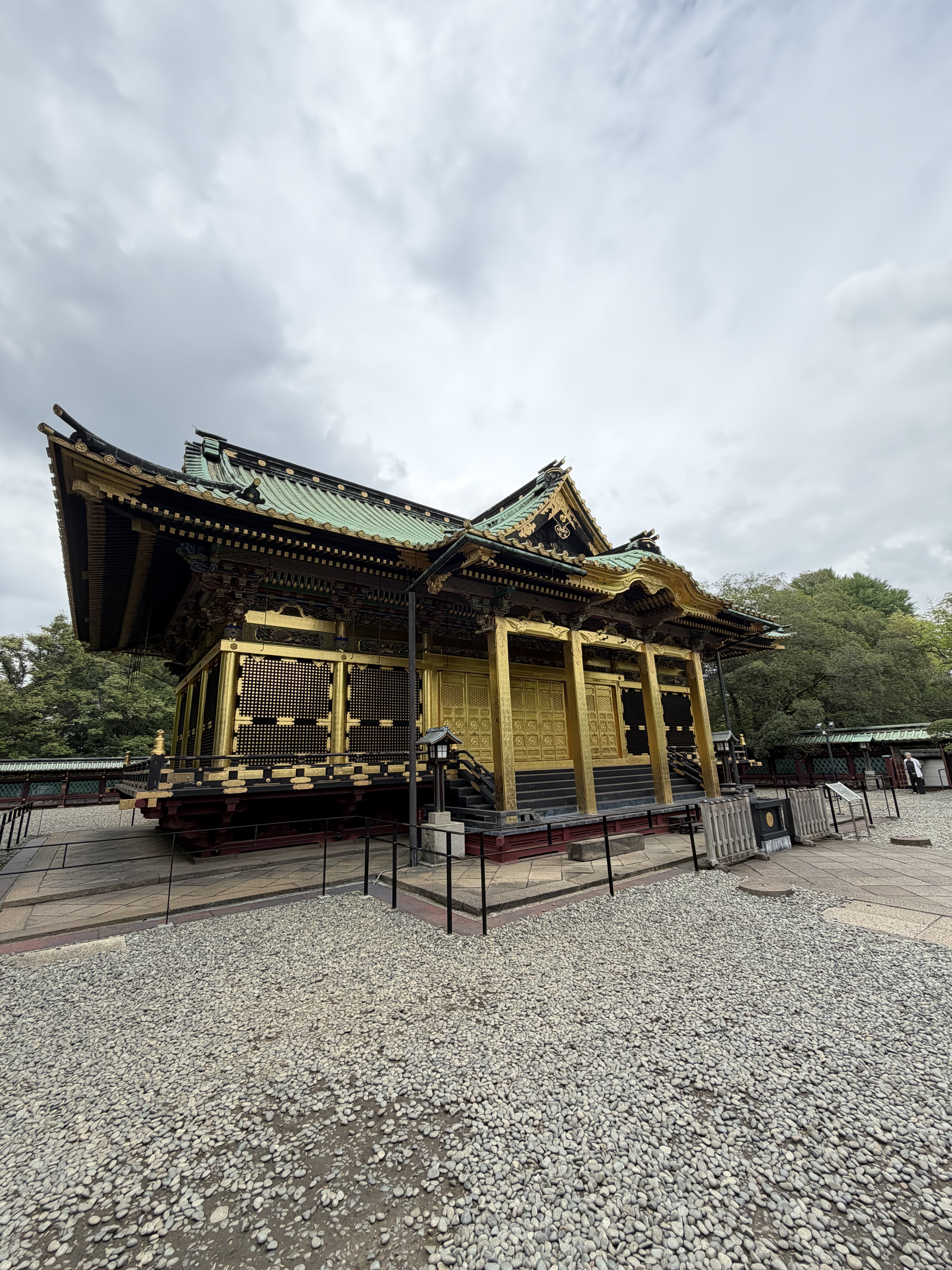
Front entrance of Shibamata Taishakuten from inside the gates

== See also ==
- Otoko wa Tsurai yo, a film series
