= Chibadera Station =

Railway station in Chiba, Japan

KS61 Chibadera Station 千葉寺駅
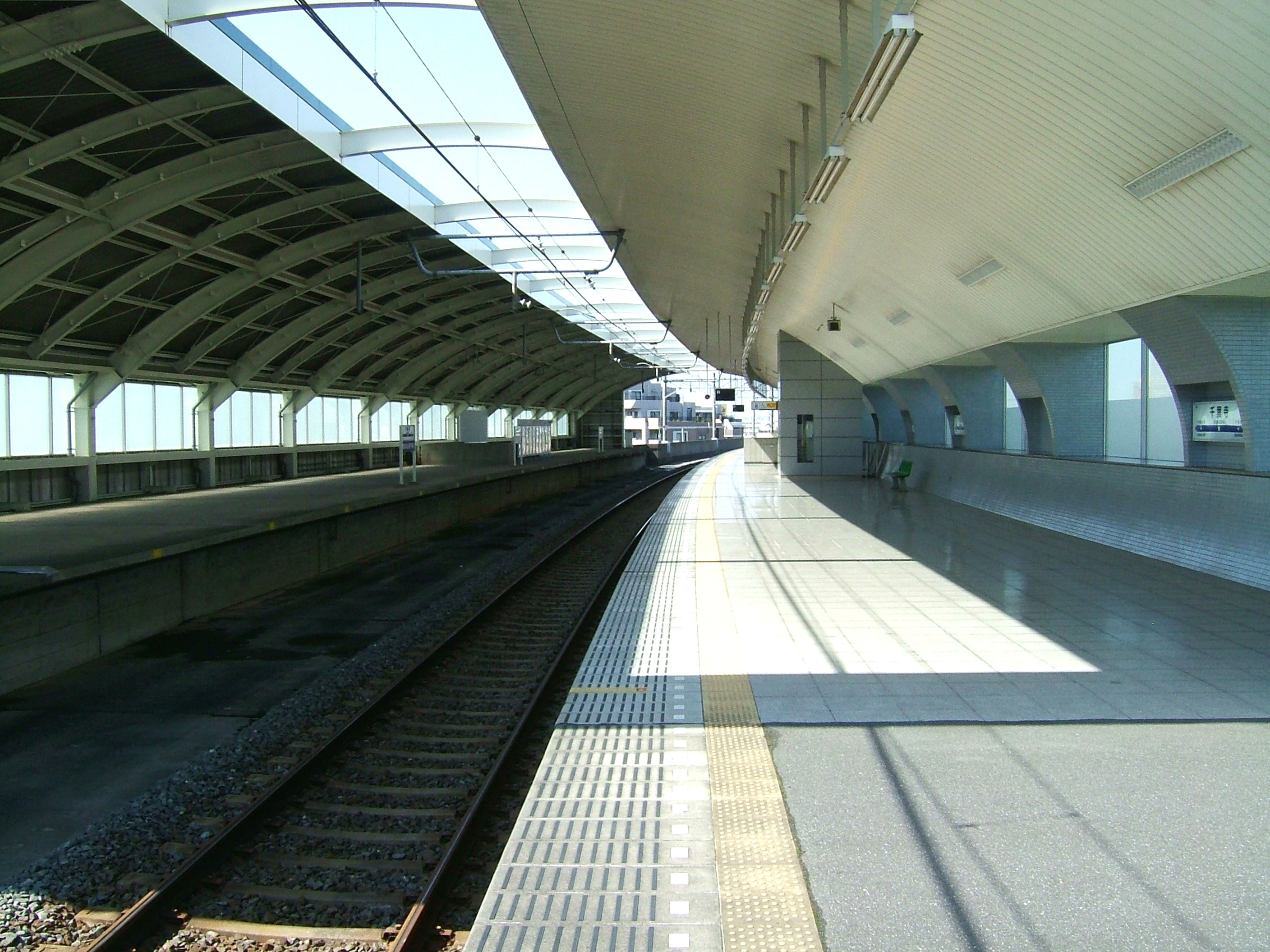
- Chibadera Station

General information
- Location: 912-1 Chibadera-cho, Chūō, Chiba, Chiba; Japan
- Coordinates: 35.5903°N 140.1322°E
- Operator: Keisei Electric Railway
- Line: Keisei Chihara Line
- Distance: 2.5 km from Chiba-Chūō
- Platforms: 1 side platform
- Tracks: 1

Other information
- Station code: KS61

History
- Opened: 1992

Passengers
- FY2016: 4,747 daily

Services
Preceding station	Keisei	Following station
Chiba-Chūō KS60 Terminus	Chihara Line	Ōmoridai KS62 towards Chiharadai
Location
- Location within Chiba Prefecture

Chibadera Station (千葉寺駅, Chibadera-eki) is a railway station operated by the Keisei Electric Railway located in Chūō-ku, Chiba Japan. It is 2.5 kilometers from the terminus of the Keisei Chihara Line at Chiba-Chūō Station.

== Lines ==
- Keisei Electric Railway
  - Keisei Chihara Line

== Layout ==
Chibadera Station has two elevated side platforms. However, only one platform is in use serving bidirectional traffic.

=== Platform ===
1	Keisei Chihara Line	for Chiba-Chūō, Keisei Chiba, and Keisei Tsudanuma
1	Keisei Chihara Line	for Chiharadai

== History ==
Chibadera Station was opened on 1 April 1992.

Station numbering was introduced to all Keisei Line stations on 17 July 2010; Chibadera Station was assigned station number KS61.

== Surrounding area ==
- Senyō-ji temple
- Aobanomori Park (see List of stadiums in Japan)
