= 1992 in rail transport =

This article lists events related to rail transport that occurred in 1992.

== Events ==
=== January events ===
- January 1 – After Estonia regained its independence, the national railway company Eesti Raudtee is established.

=== March events ===
- March 3 – The Podsosenka train disaster near Nelidovo, Tver Oblast in Russia kills 43.

=== April events ===
- April 1 – Opening of the Keisei Chihara Line from Keisei Chiba Station to Ōmoridai Station.
- April 3 – The Goderich Exeter Railway begins operations in Ontario, Canada.
- April 3 – The new light rail system in Baltimore, Maryland, USA, opens for service on a very limited basis, running only on days with baseball games at a new Camden Yards stadium station it serves, and only for a period of about 2 hours before and after each game (see May 17).
- April 6 – The first section of Manchester Metrolink, in Manchester, England, opens.
- April 14 - The Madrid-Seville AVE line opens

=== May events ===
- May 12 – Republika Srpska Railways formally established.
- May 17 – Regular service begins on the new Baltimore Light Rail system (see April 3).

=== July events ===
- July 1 – JR East introduces the Yamagata Shinkansen, the first mini-shinkansen service, on the Ōu Main Line connecting Fukushima and Yamagata.

=== August events ===
- August 27 – The 3200-series rapid transit cars (3201–3457), built by Morrison-Knudsen of Hornell, New York, are placed in service on the Chicago "L" system, retiring the last of the old 6000-series cars from the 1950s. The 3200-series cars are operated on the Ravenswood Line, and eventually, the upcoming Midway Airport Line the following year.

=== October events ===
- October 26 – Southern California's Metrolink opens.
- October – Public rail transport in Jamaica ceases operation.

=== December events ===
- December 20 – Western Australian Premier Carmen Lawrence opens three stations on the new Joondalup line, an extension to the Transperth rail network.
- December 23 – Nuevo Central Argentino is granted a concession to operate freight trains over former Ferrocarriles Argentinos tracks in and around Buenos Aires.

=== Unknown date events ===
- General Motors Electro-Motive Division introduces the EMD SD70.
- Paul Tellier is appointed to the presidency of Canadian National.
- Wisconsin & Calumet Railroad is acquired by the Wisconsin & Southern Railroad
- Amtrak commissions three prototype RoadRailers for testing behind regular revenue passenger trains.
- South African Railways ceases use of steam locomotives (other than Outeniqua Choo Tjoe tourist operation).
- Indian Railways introduces 'women only' trains on Mumbai Western and Central suburban lines
- Voralpen Express in Switzerland given this name.
- Buses replace streetcars along the Girard Avenue Line in Philadelphia – rail service would not be restored for thirteen years.

== Deaths ==
=== October deaths ===
- October 19 – H. Reid, prominent railroad photographer and historian (b. 1925).
