= Kemigawa Station =

Railway station in Chiba, Japan

KS54 Kemigawa Station 検見川駅
- Kemigawa Station in February 2026

General information
- Location: 1-791 Kemigawacho, Hanamigawa Ward, Chiba City, Chiba Prefecture; Japan
- Coordinates: 35.6523°N 140.0666°E
- Operator: Keisei Electric Railway
- Line: Keisei Chiba Line
- Distance: 5.3 km from Keisei-Tsudanuma
- Platforms: 2 side platforms
- Tracks: 2

Other information
- Station code: KS54

History
- Opened: 17 July 1921

Passengers
- FY2009: 3,596 daily

Services
Preceding station	Keisei	Following station
Keisei Makuhari KS53 towards Keisei Tsudanuma	Chiba Line	Keisei Inage KS55 towards Chiba-Chūō
Location
- Location within Chiba Prefecture Location within Japan

Kemigawa Station (検見川駅, Kemigawa-eki) is a railway station on the Keisei Chiba Line operated by the private railway operator Keisei Electric Railway in Kemigawacho, Hanamigawa Ward, Chiba City, Chiba Prefecture, Japan.

== Lines ==
Kemigawa Station is served by the Keisei Chiba Line, and lies 5.3 kilometers from the terminus of the line at Keisei-Tsudanuma Station.

== Layout ==
Kemigawa Station has two opposed side platforms connected by a level crossing.

=== Platforms ===
1	Keisei Chiba Line	for Keisei Tsudanuma, Aoto, and Keisei Ueno; Keisei Matsudo Line for Matsudo
2	Keisei Chiba Line	for Keisei Chiba and Chiharadai

== History ==
Kemigawa Station opened on July 17, 1921.

Station numbering was introduced to all Keisei Line stations on 17 July 2010; Kemigawa Station was assigned station number KS54.

== See also ==
- List of railway stations in Japan
