= Shin-Chiba Station =

Railway station in Chiba, Japan

Coordinates: 35.6122°N 140.1083°E

KS58 Shin-Chiba Station 新千葉駅
- Shin-Chiba Station Platforms

General information
- Location: 2-10-15 Nobuto, Chūō, Chiba, Chiba （千葉県千葉市中央区登戸2-10-15） Japan
- Operator: Keisei Electric Railway
- Line: Keisei Chiba Line

Other information
- Station code: KS58

History
- Opened: 1923

Passengers
- 2009: 1,375 daily

Services
Preceding station	Keisei	Following station
Nishi-Nobuto KS57 towards Keisei Tsudanuma	Chiba Line	Keisei Chiba KS59 towards Chiba-Chūō
Location

Shin-Chiba Station (新千葉駅, Shin-Chiba-eki) is a railway station operated by the Keisei Electric Railway located in Chūō-ku, Chiba Japan. It is 11.7 kilometers from the terminus of the Keisei Chiba Line at Keisei-Tsudanuma Station.

== History ==
Shin-Chiba Station was opened on 24 July 1923.

Station numbering was introduced to all Keisei Line stations on 17 July 2010; Shin-Chiba Station was assigned station number KS58.

== Lines ==
- Keisei Electric Railway
  - Keisei Chiba Line

== Layout ==
Shin-Chiba Station has two elevated opposed side platforms with the station building underneath.

=== Platforms ===
1	Keisei Chiba Line	for Keisei Tsudanuma, Aoto, and Keisei Ueno; Keisei Matsudo Line for Matsudo
2	Keisei Chiba Line	for Keisei Chiba and Chiharadai
