= Gakuemmae Station (Chiba) =

Railway station in Chiba, Japan

KS63 Gakuemmae Station 学園前駅
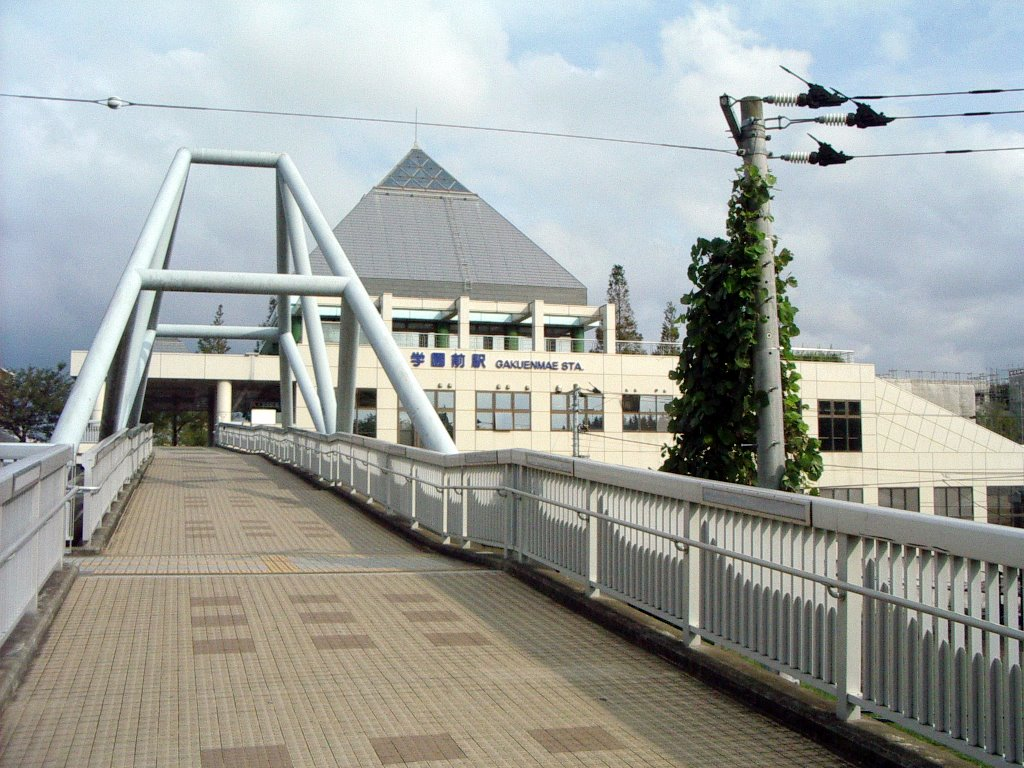
- Gakuemmae Station

General information
- Location: 1-14-2 Oyumino-Chūō, Midori, Chiba, Chiba （千葉県千葉市緑区おゆみ野中央1-14-2） Japan
- Coordinates: 35°33′39″N 140°09′30″E
- Operator: Keisei Electric Railway
- Line: Keisei Chihara Line

Other information
- Station code: KS63

History
- Opened: 1995

Passengers
- 2009: 4,115 daily

Services
Preceding station	Keisei	Following station
Ōmoridai KS62 towards Chiba-Chūō	Chihara Line	Oyumino KS64 towards Chiharadai
Location

Gakuemmae Station (学園前駅, Gakuenmae-eki) is a railway station operated by the Keisei Electric Railway located in Midori-ku, Chiba Japan. It is 7.3 kilometers from the terminus of the Keisei Chihara Line at Chiba-Chūō Station.

== History ==
Gakuemmae Station was opened on 1 April 1995.

Station numbering was introduced to all Keisei Line stations on 17 July 2010; Gakuemmae Station was assigned station number KS63.

== Lines ==
- Keisei Electric Railway
  - Keisei Chihara Line

== Layout ==
Gakuemmae Station has two elevated opposed side platforms, with a station building underneath.

=== Platforms ===
1	■ Keisei Chihara Line	Keisei-Tsudanuma ・ Chiba-Chūō
2	■ Keisei Chihara Line	Chiharadai
