= Oyumino Station =

Railway station in Chiba, Japan

Coordinates: 35.5499°N 140.1663°E

KS64 Oyumino Station おゆみ野駅
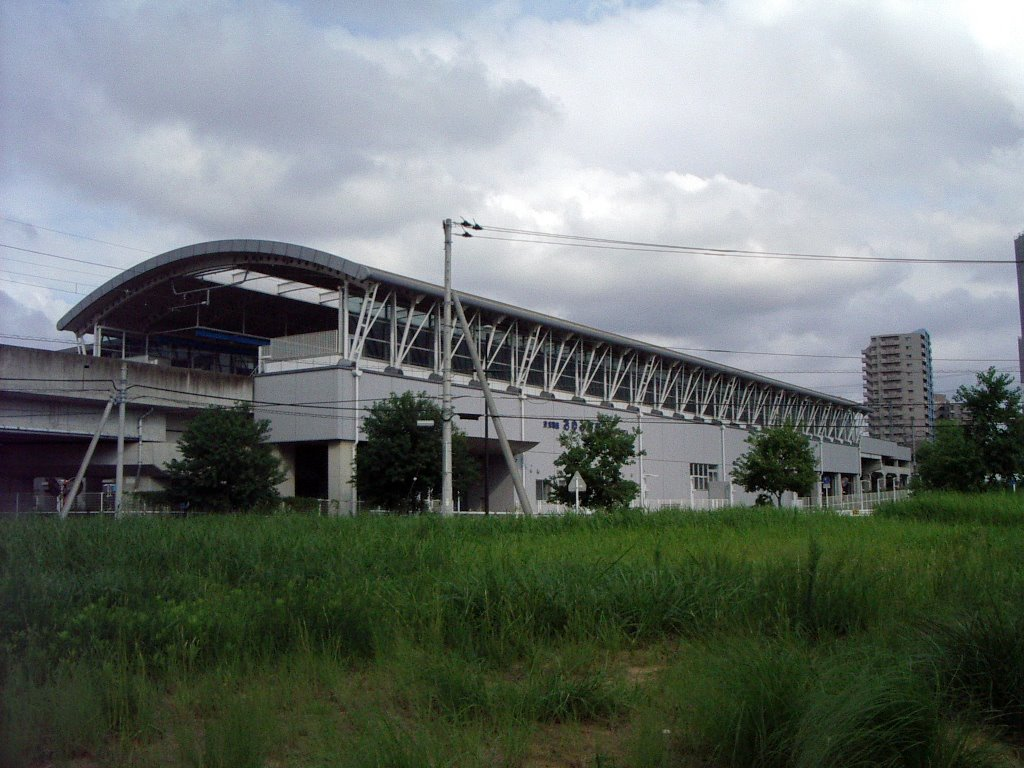
- Oyumino Station

General information
- Location: 3-27-1 Oyumino-Nishi, Midori, Chiba, Chiba （千葉県千葉市緑区おゆみ野南3-27-1） Japan
- Operator: Keisei Electric Railway
- Line: Keisei Chihara Line

Other information
- Station code: KS64

History
- Opened: 1995

Passengers
- 2009: 4,060 daily

Services
| Preceding station | Keisei | Following station |
|---|---|---|
| Gakuemmae KS63 towards Chiba-Chūō | Chihara Line | Chiharadai KS65 Terminus |
Location

Oyumino Station (おゆみ野駅, Oyumino-eki) is a railway station operated by the Keisei Electric Railway located in Midori-ku, Chiba Japan. It is 8.8 kilometers from the terminus of the Keisei Chihara Line at Chiba-Chūō Station.

== History ==
Oyumino Station was opened on 1 April 1995.

Station numbering was introduced to all Keisei Line stations on 17 July 2010. Oyumino was assigned station number KS64.

== Lines ==
- Keisei Electric Railway
  - Keisei Chihara Line

== Layout ==
Oyumino Station has two elevated opposed side platforms, with a station building underneath. However, only one of the platforms is in use.

=== Platforms ===
| 1 | ■ Keisei Chihara Line | Keisei-Tsudanuma ・ Chiba-Chūō |
| 2 | ■ Keisei Chihara Line | unused |

== Gallery ==
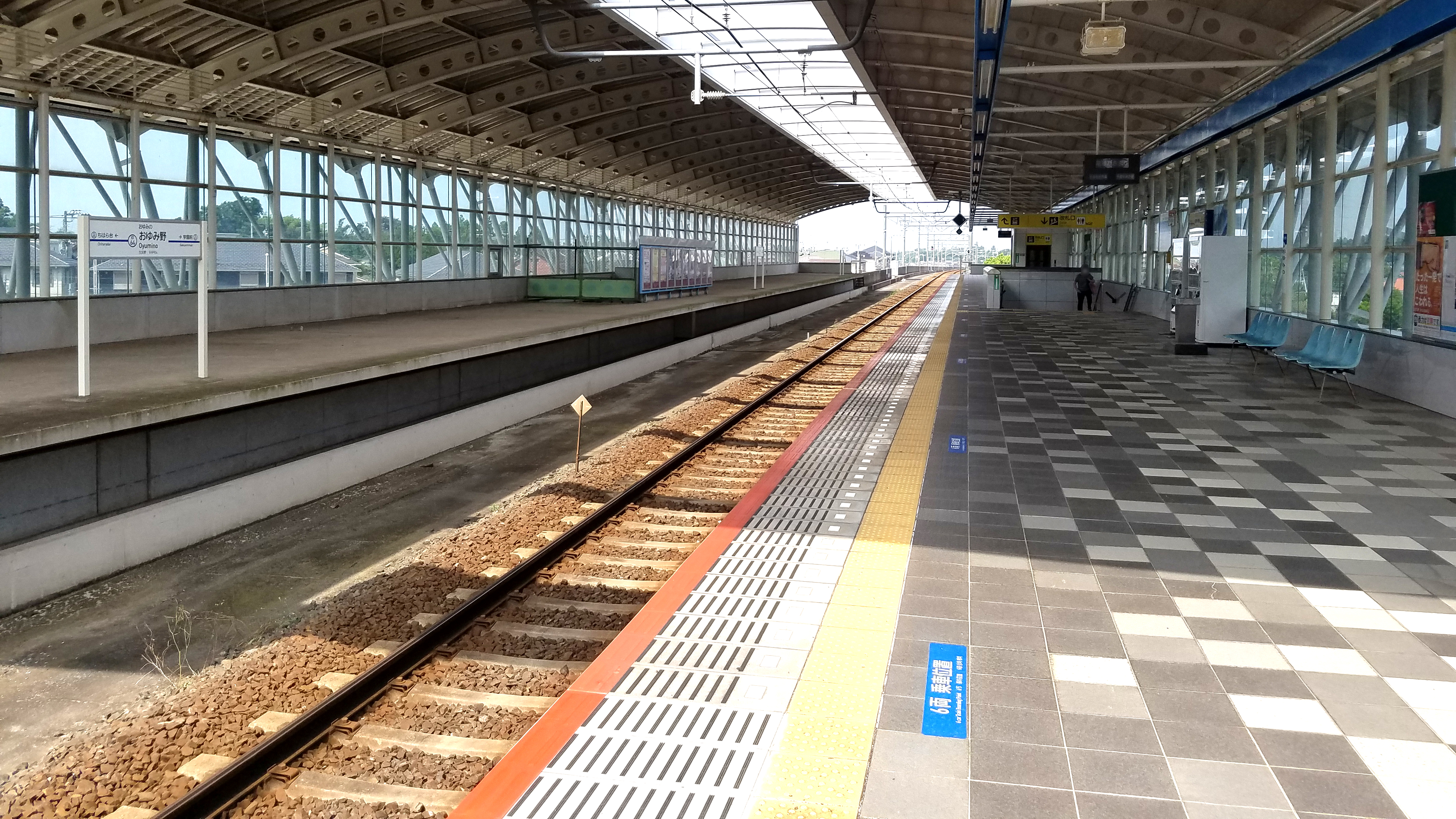
Track level with unused platform on opposite side

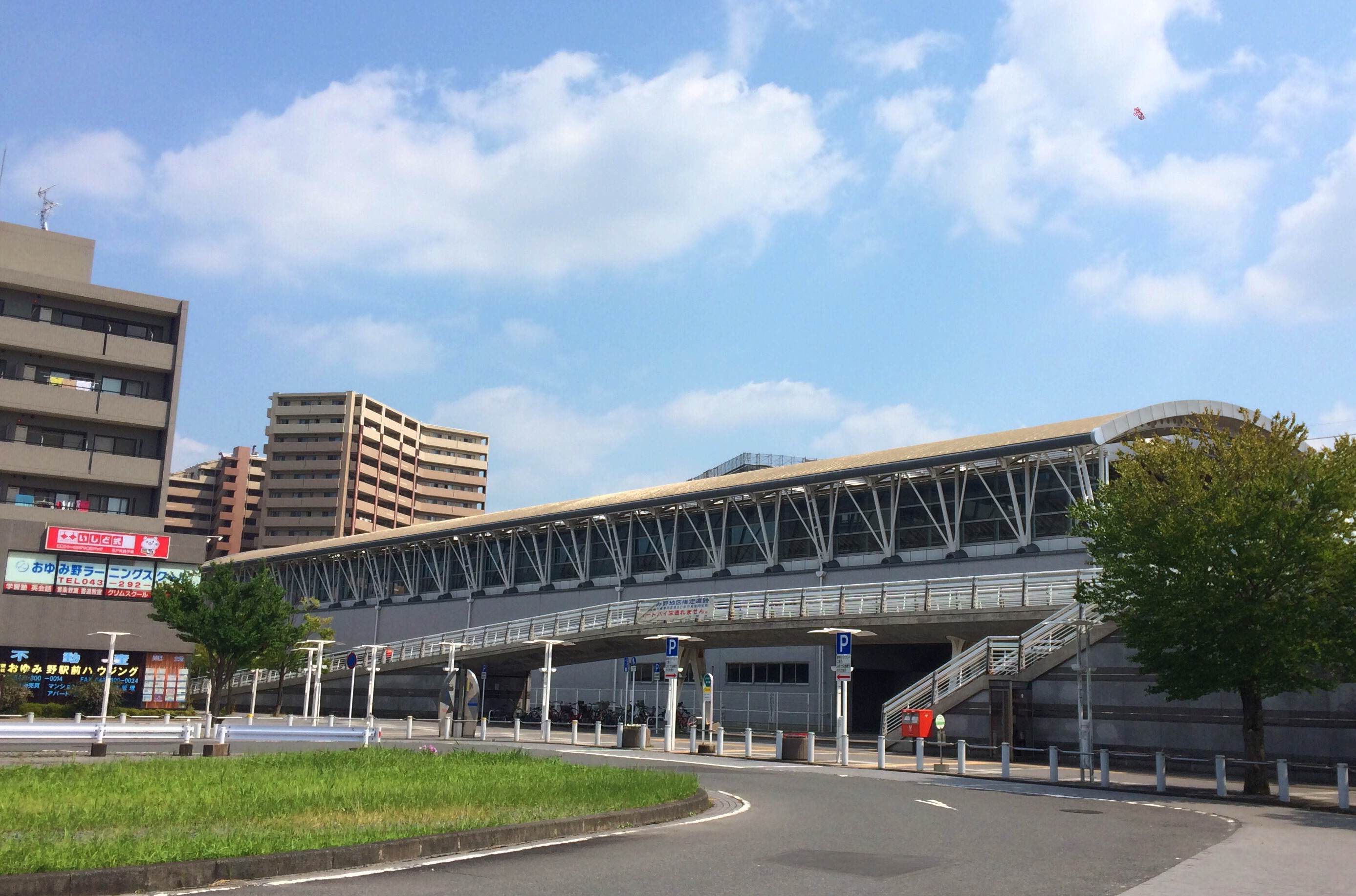
Station building from the north side
