= Gakuen-mae Station =

Gakuen-mae Station may refer to:

- Gakuen-mae Station (Chiba) - in Chiba Prefecture
- Gakuen-mae Station (Hokkaido) - in Hokkaidō
- Gakuen-mae Station (Nara) - in Nara Prefecture
