= Keisei Chiba Line =

Railway line in Chiba Prefecture, Japan

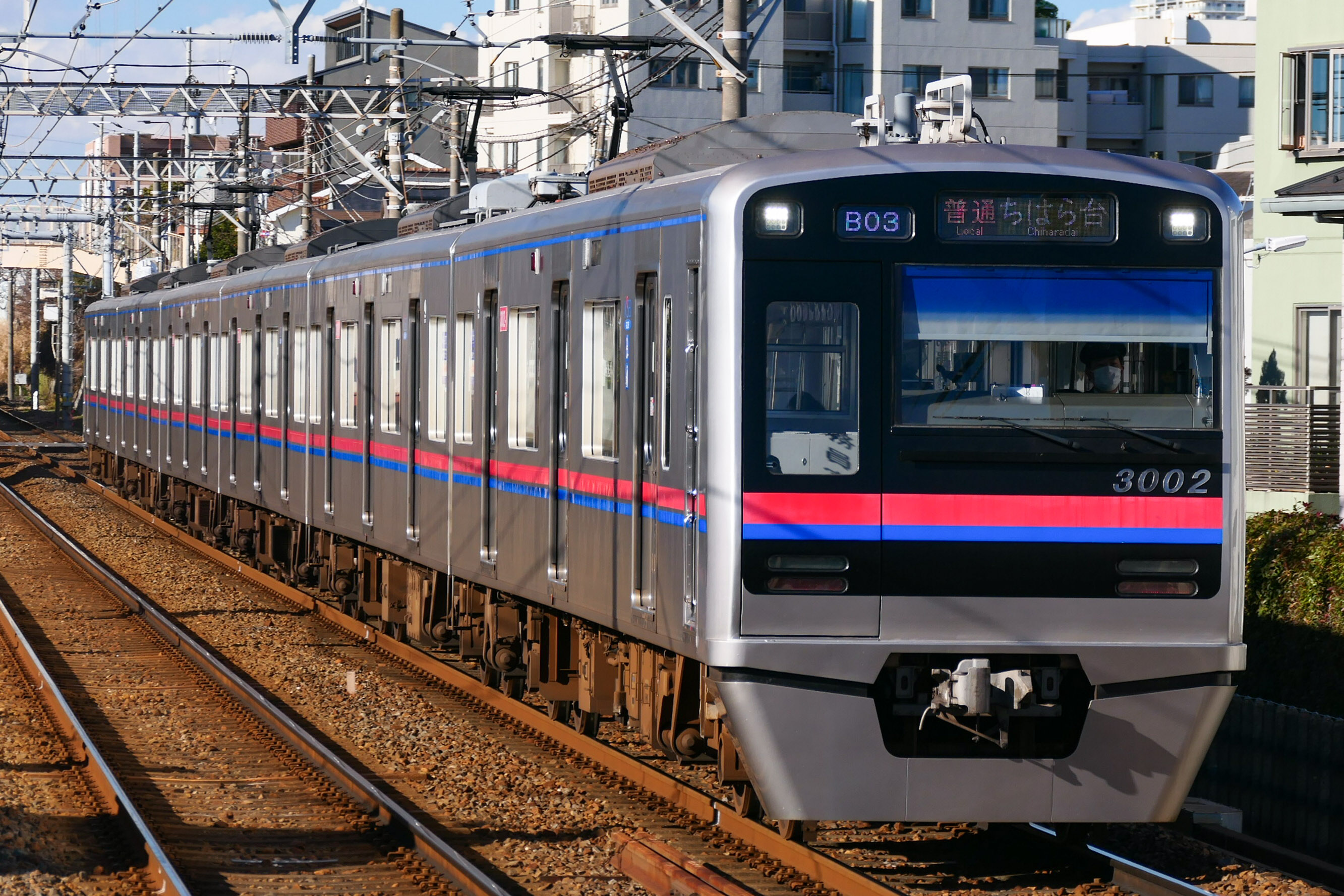
- Keisei 3000 series EMU on the Chiba Line, January 2025

Overview
- Native name: 京成千葉線
- Locale: Chiba Prefecture
- Termini: Keisei Tsudanuma; Chiba Chūō
- Stations: 10

Service
- Type: Heavy rail
- Operator: Keisei Electric Railway

History
- Opened: 17 July 1921; 105 years ago

Technical
- Line length: 12.9 km (8.0 mi)
- Track gauge: 1,435 mm (4 ft 8 1/2 in) standard gauge
- Electrification: Overhead line, 1,500 V DC
- Operating speed: 95 km/h (59 mph)

The Keisei Chiba Line (Japanese: 京成千葉線, Hepburn: Keisei Chiba-sen) is a railway line in Chiba Prefecture, Japan, operated by the private railway operator Keisei Electric Railway. It branches from the Keisei Main Line at Keisei Tsudanuma Station and connects to Chiba Chūō Station. At Chiba Chūō Station, the line is connected to the Chihara Line.

== History ==
The entire line opened on 17 July 1921 as an electrified, dual-track, 1,372 mm (4 ft 6 in) gauge branch line. On 10 October 1959, the line was regauged to 1,435 mm (4 ft 8 1/2 in) in conjunction with the regauging of the Main Line.

Shin-Keisei Line (Keisei Matsudo Line from April 2025) through services commenced on 10 December 2006.

== Stations ==
All stations are in Chiba Prefecture. All trains are local trains that stop at all stations.

No.	Station	Distance in km (mi)		Transfers	Location
No.	Station	Between stations	Total	Transfers	Location
↑ Through-running to/from Keisei-Ueno via the Main Line (mornings/evenings) or Matsudo via the Matsudo Line (daytime) ↑
KS26	Keisei Tsudanuma 京成津田沼	—N/a	0 (0)	Main Line (some through services); Matsudo Line (some through services)	Narashino
KS52	Keisei Makuharihongō 京成幕張本郷	2.1 (1.3)	2.1 (1.3)	Chūō–Sōbu Line (Makuharihongō: JB34)	Hanamigawa, Chiba
KS53	Keisei Makuhari 京成幕張	1.9 (1.2)	4.0 (2.5)	Chūō–Sōbu Line (Makuhari: JB35)	Hanamigawa, Chiba
KS54	Kemigawa 検見川	1.3 (0.81)	5.3 (3.3)		Hanamigawa, Chiba
KS55	Keisei Inage 京成稲毛	2.8 (1.7)	8.1 (5.0)		Inage, Chiba
KS56	Midori-dai みどり台	1.8 (1.1)	9.9 (6.2)		Inage, Chiba
KS57	Nishi-Nobuto 西登戸	1.0 (0.62)	10.9 (6.8)		Chūō, Chiba
KS58	Shin-Chiba 新千葉	0.8 (0.50)	11.7 (7.3)		Chūō, Chiba
KS59	Keisei Chiba 京成千葉	0.6 (0.37)	12.3 (7.6)	Chūō–Sōbu Line (Chiba: JB39); Sōbu Line (Chiba: JO28); ■ Uchibō Line (Chiba); ■ Sotobō Line (Chiba); ■ Narita Line (Chiba); ■ Sōbu Main Line (Chiba); Chiba Urban Monorail (Chiba: CM03)	Chūō, Chiba
KS60	Chiba-Chūō 千葉中央	0.6 (0.37)	12.9 (8.0)	Chihara Line (some through services)	Chūō, Chiba
↓ Through-running to/from Chiharadai via the Chihara Line ↓

=== Operation Pattern ===
In the daytime, trains from Keisei Tsudanuma to Chiharadai station and Shin-Keisei through services from Matsudo to Chiba-Chuo run at 20-minute intervals. On the Keisei Chiba Line, trains operate at 10-minute intervals. All trains are at most 6 cars long due to the platform length restriction at the intermediate stops between Keisei Tsudanuma Station and Keisei Chiba Station. Four-car trains were also used on the line, but they were discontinued at the start of the 8 December 2018 timetable revision.

There are also trains to and from Keisei Ueno Station on the Main Line during mornings and evenings. In the morning, trains towards Keisei Tsudanuma operate at the same 10-minute interval as other trains, and trains towards Chiba Chuo operate every 6 to 10 minutes.
