= Ōmoridai Station =

Railway station in Chiba, Japan

Coordinates: 35.5841°N 140.1492°E

KS62 Ōmoridai Station 大森台駅
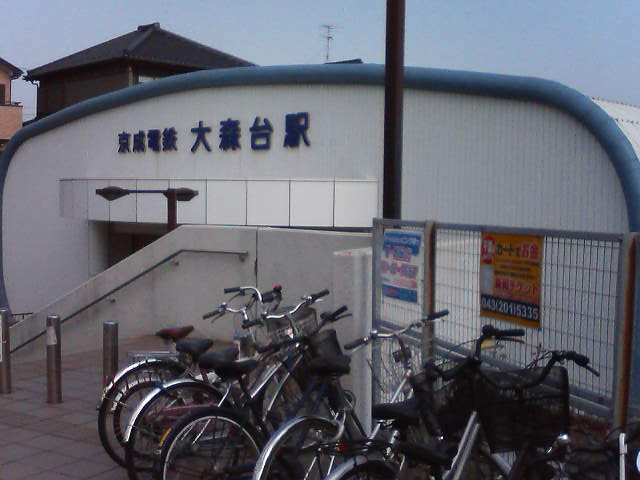
- Ōmoridai Station

General information
- Location: 463-2 Ōmori-cho, Chūō, Chiba, Chiba （千葉県千葉市中央区大森町４６３－３） Japan
- Operator: Keisei Electric Railway
- Line: Keisei Chihara Line

Other information
- Station code: KS62

History
- Opened: 1992

Passengers
- 2009: 2,730 daily

Services
Preceding station	Keisei	Following station
Chibadera KS61 towards Chiba-Chūō	Chihara Line	Gakuemmae KS63 towards Chiharadai
Location

Ōmoridai Station (大森台駅, Ōmoridai-eki) is a railway station operated by the Keisei Electric Railway located in Chūō-ku, Chiba Japan. It is 4.2 kilometers from the terminus of the Keisei Chihara Line at Chiba-Chūō Station.

== History ==
Ōmoridai Station was opened on 1 April 1992 as the initial terminal station of the Chihara Line. The line was extended to Chiharadai Station by 1 April 1995.

Station numbering was introduced to all Keisei Line stations on 17 July 2010; Ōmoridai Station was assigned station number KS62.

== Lines ==
- Keisei Electric Railway
  - Keisei Chihara Line

== Layout ==
Ōmoridai Station is an underground railway station with two opposed side platforms.

=== Platforms ===
1	■ Keisei Chihara Line	For Chiba-Chūō and Keisei-Tsudanuma
2	■ Keisei Chihara Line	For Chiharadai
