= Oyumi Domain =

Japanese domain

Oyumi Domain 生実藩
- under Tokugawa shogunate Japan
- 1627–1871
- Capital: Oyumi jin'ya
- Government
  - Type: Daimyō
- Historical era: Edo period
  - Established: 1627
  - Disestablished: 1871
- Today part of: part of Chiba Prefecture

The Oyumi Domain (Japanese: 生実藩, Hepburn: Oyumi-han) was a Japanese domain of the Edo period, located in Shimōsa Province (modern-day Chiba Prefecture), Japan. The site of the Oyumi jin'ya is now under a residential area of the city of Chiba. The domain was ruled through its entire history by the Morikawa clan.

== History ==
The Oyumi Domain was created in February 1627, when Morikawa Shigetoshi, a hatamoto in the service of Shōgun Tokugawa Hidetada acquired holdings in Sagami, Kazusa and Shimōsa Provinces with revenues exceeding the 10,000 koku necessary to qualify as a daimyō. He was allowed to build a jin'ya on the site of the Sengoku period Oyumi Castle. He later rose to the post of rōjū, and committed junshi on the death of Tokugawa Hidetada. His successors continued to rule the Oyumi Domain until the Meiji Restoration.

== Holdings at the end of the Edo period ==
As with most domains in the han system, Oyumi Domain consisted of several discontinuous territories calculated to provide the assigned kokudaka, based on periodic cadastral surveys and projected agricultural yields. The domain was centered on what is now Chuo Ward and Midori Ward of the city of Chiba.

- Shimōsa Province
  - 19 villages in Chiba District
  - 3 villages in Sōsa District
  - 1 village in Kaijō District
- Kazusa Province
  - 1 village in Nagara District
  - 1 village in Musha District
- Sagami Province
  - 1 village in Kamakura District
  - 3 villages in Osumi District

== List of daimyō ==
- Morikawa clan (fudai) 1627-1871

#	Name	Tenure	Courtesy title	Court Rank	revenues
1	Morikawa Shigetoshi (森川重俊)	1627–1632	Dewa-no-kami (出羽守)	Lower 5th (従五位下)	10, 000 koku
2	Morikawa Shigemasa (森川重政)	1632–1663	Iga-no-kami (伊賀守)	Lower 5th (従五位下)	10,000 koku
3	Morikawa Shigenobu (森川重信)	1663–1692	Dewa-no-kami (出羽守)	Lower 5th (従五位下)	10,000 koku
4	Morikawa Shigetane (森川俊胤)	1692–1732	Dewa-no-kami (出羽守)	Lower 5th (従五位下)	10,000 koku
5	Morikawa Shigetsune (森川俊常)	1732–1734	Naizen-no-kami (内膳正)	Lower 5th (従五位下)	10,000 koku
6	Morikawa Shigenori (森川俊令)	1734–1764	Naizen-no-kami (内膳正)	Lower 5th (従五位下)	10,000 koku
7	Morikawa Shigetaka (森川俊孝)	1764–1788	Kii-no-kami (紀伊守)	Lower 5th (従五位下)	10, 000 koku
8	Morikawa Shigetomo (森川俊知)	1788–1838	Naizen-no-kami (内膳正)	Lower 5th (従五位下)	10,000 koku
9	Morikawa Shigetami (森川俊民)	1838–1855	Dewa-no-kami (出羽守)	Lower 5th (従五位下)	10,000 koku
10	Morikawa Shigehira (森川俊位)	1855–1858	Dewa-no-kami (出羽守)	Lower 5th (従五位下)	10,000 koku
11	Morikawa Shigenori (森川俊徳)	1858–1862	Dewa-no-kami (出羽守)	Lower 5th (従五位下)	10,000 koku
12	Morikawa Shigekata (森川俊方)	1862–1871	Naizen-no-kami (内膳正)	Lower 5th (従五位下)	10,000 koku
