= Midori-ku, Chiba =

Midori 緑区
- Ward
- Midori Ward
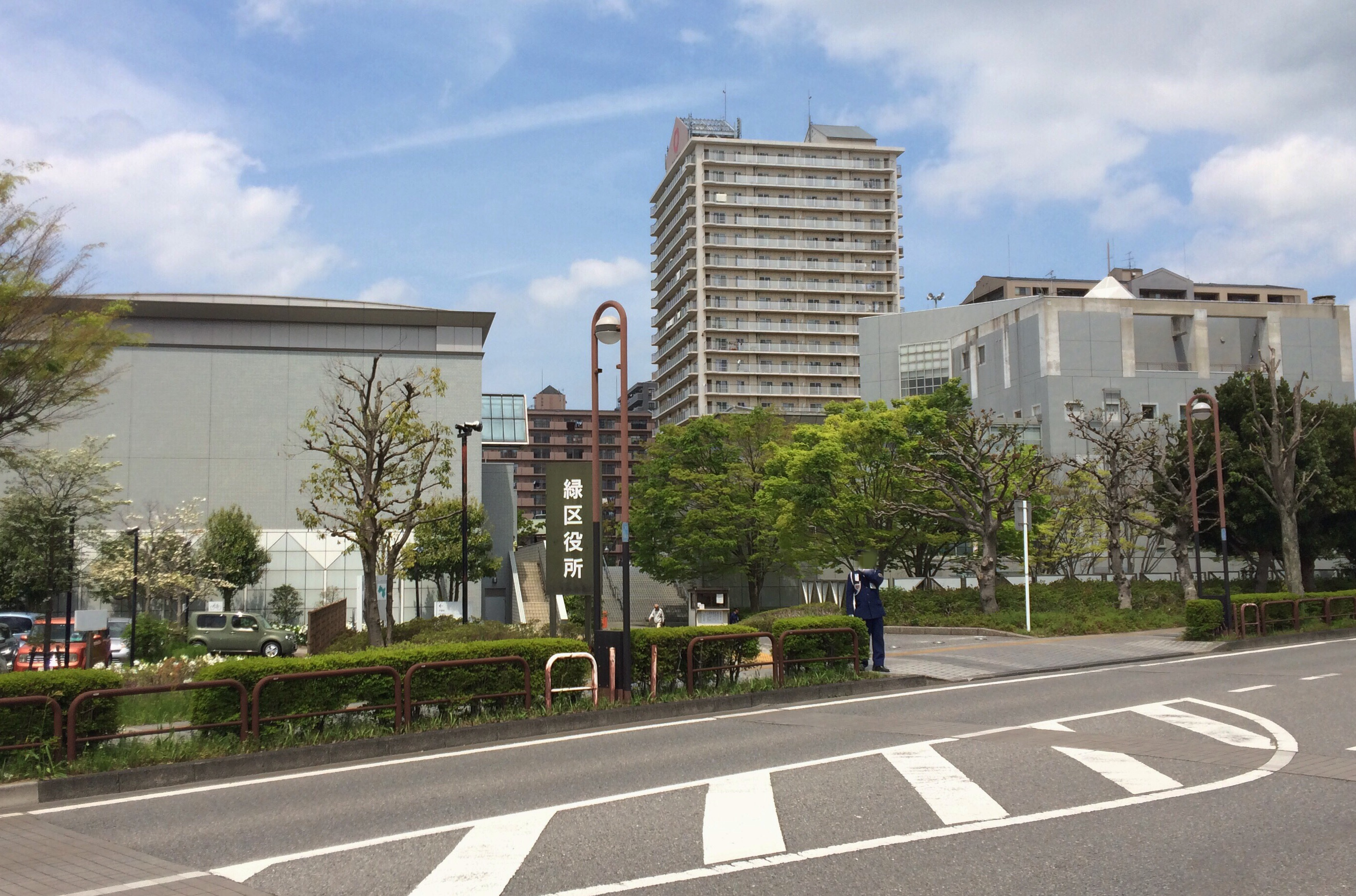
- Midori Ward Office, Chiba

- Flag Seal

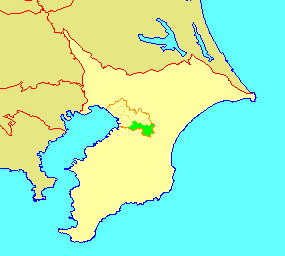
- Location of Midori in Chiba

- Coordinates: 35°33′38″N 140°10′34″E
- Country: Japan
- Region: Kantō
- Prefecture: Chiba
- City: Chiba

Area
  - Total: 66.25 km^{2} (25.58 sq mi)

Population (February 2016)
  - Total: 127,368
  - Density: 1,920/km^{2} (5,000/sq mi)
- Time zone: UTC+9 (Japan Standard Time)
- Address: 3-15-3 Oyumino, Midori-ku Chiba-shi, Chiba-ken 266-0031
- Website: www.city.chiba.jp/midori/index.html

Midori Ward (緑区, Midori-ku) is one of the six wards of the city of Chiba in Chiba Prefecture, Japan. As of February 2016, the ward had an estimated population of 127,368 and a population density of 1920 persons per km^{2}. The total area was 66.25 square kilometres (25.58 sq mi).

== Geography ==
Ward within Chiba

Midori Ward is located in an inland area of southeastern Chiba city.

=== Surrounding municipalities ===
Chiba Prefecture

- Wakaba Ward
- Chūō Ward
- Tōgane
- Ichihara
- Mobara
- Ōamishirasato

== History ==
During the Edo period, Midori-ku was the location of the jin'ya of Oyumi Domain, a feudal domain ruled by the Morikawa clan from 1627 until 1871 under the Tokugawa shogunate. After the Meiji Restoration, the area was divided on April 1, 1889, into the villages of Shiina, Honda and Oihama within Chiba District, and Toke Town in Sanbu District. Oihama became a town on November 10, 1928. On February 11, 1955, the city of Chiba annexed Oihama, Shiina and Honda. On July 15, 1969, the town of Toke merged into the city of Chiba as well. With the promotion of Chiba to a designated city with additional autonomy from Chiba prefecture and the central government on April 1, 1992, Midori Ward was created as an administrative unit.

== Economy ==
Midori Ward is largely a regional commercial center and bedroom community for central Chiba and Tokyo.

== Education ==
Municipal elementary and junior high schools are operated by the Chiba City Board of Education (千葉市教育委員会).

Municipal junior high schools:

- Ariyoshi (有吉中学校)
- Honda (誉田中学校)
- Izumiya (泉谷中学校)
- Ochi (越智中学校)
- Oji (大椎中学校)
- Oyumino Minami (おゆみ野南中学校)
- Toke (土気中学校)
- Toke Minami (土気南中学校)

Municipal elementary schools:

- Ariyoshi (有吉小学校)
- Asumigaoka (あすみが丘小学校)
- Hirayama (平山小学校)
- Honda (誉田小学校)
- Honda Higashi (誉田東小学校)
- Izumiya (泉谷小学校)
- Kanezawa (金沢小学校)
- Koyatsu (小谷小学校)
- Ochi (越智小学校)
- Ogida (扇田小学校)
- Oji (大椎小学校)
- Okido (大木戸小学校)
- Oyumino Minami (おゆみ野南小学校)
- Shiina (椎名小学校)
- Toke (土気小学校)
- Toke Minami (土気南小学校)

== Culture ==
- Hoki Museum

== Transportation ==
=== Railroads ===
- JR East – Sotobō Line
  - Kamatori - Honda - Toke
- Keisei – Chihara Line
  - Gakuenmae - Oyumino

=== Highways ===
- Chiba-Tōgane Road

== Noted people from Midori Ward ==
- Kōsuke Fujishima – manga artist
- Kōichi Tokita – manga artist
- Tetsuya Harada – Grand Prix motorcycle racer
