= Chiba Meitoku College =

Private junior college in Chūō-ku, Chiba, Chiba Prefecture, Japan

Coordinates: 35°39′09.81″N 140°01′48.97″E

- 千葉明徳短期大学; Chiba meitoku tanki daigaku
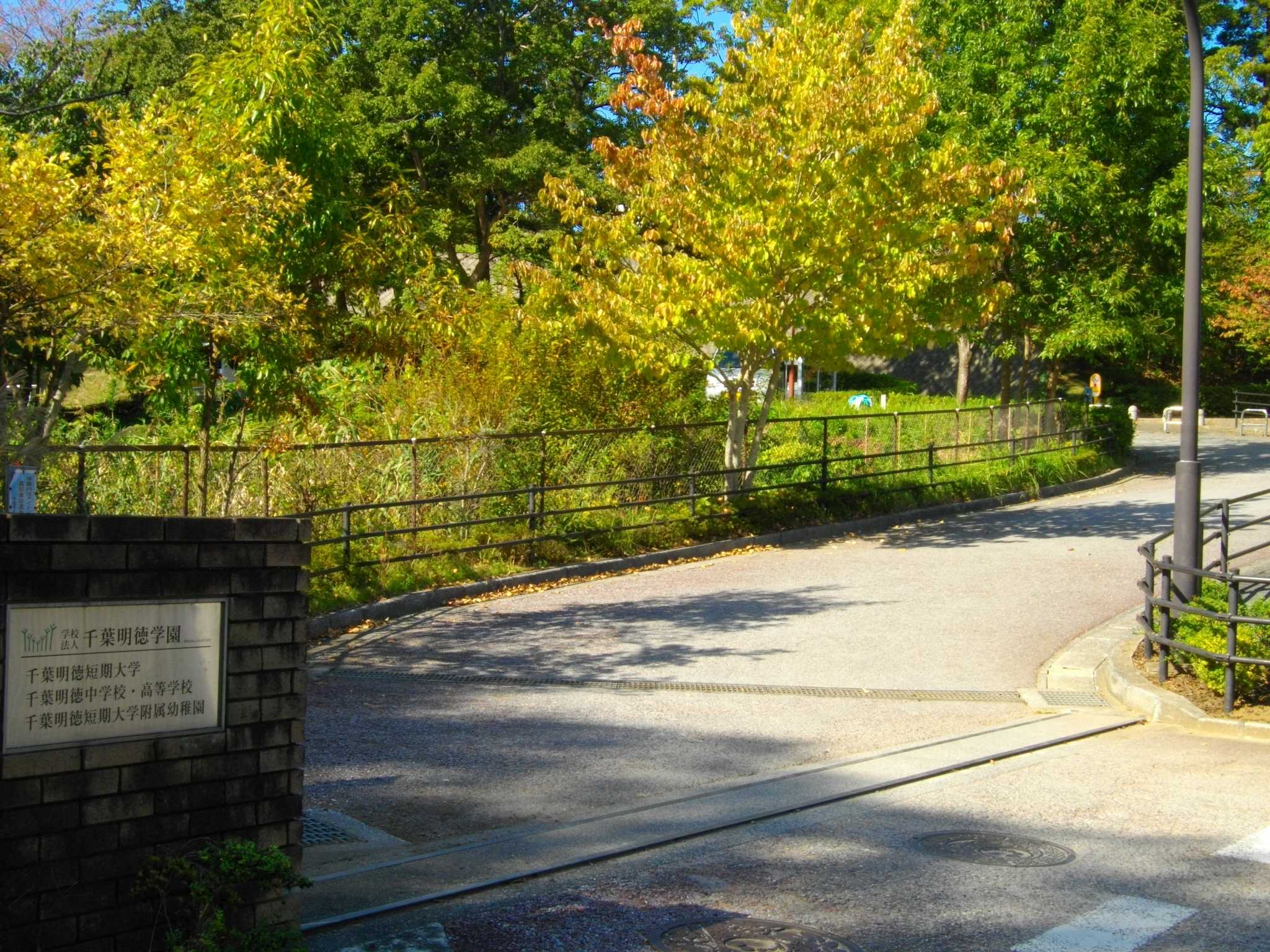
- Type: Private
- Established: 1925
- Location: Chūō-ku, Chiba, Chiba, Japan
- Website: www.chibameitoku.ac.jp/tandai.html

Chiba Meitoku College (千葉明徳短期大学, Chiba meitoku tanki daigaku) is a private junior college in Chūō-ku, Chiba, Chiba Prefecture, Japan, established in 1970. The predecessor of the school, a women's college, was founded in 1925.
