= Chiba-dera =

Buddhist temple in Chiba, Japan

- 千葉寺
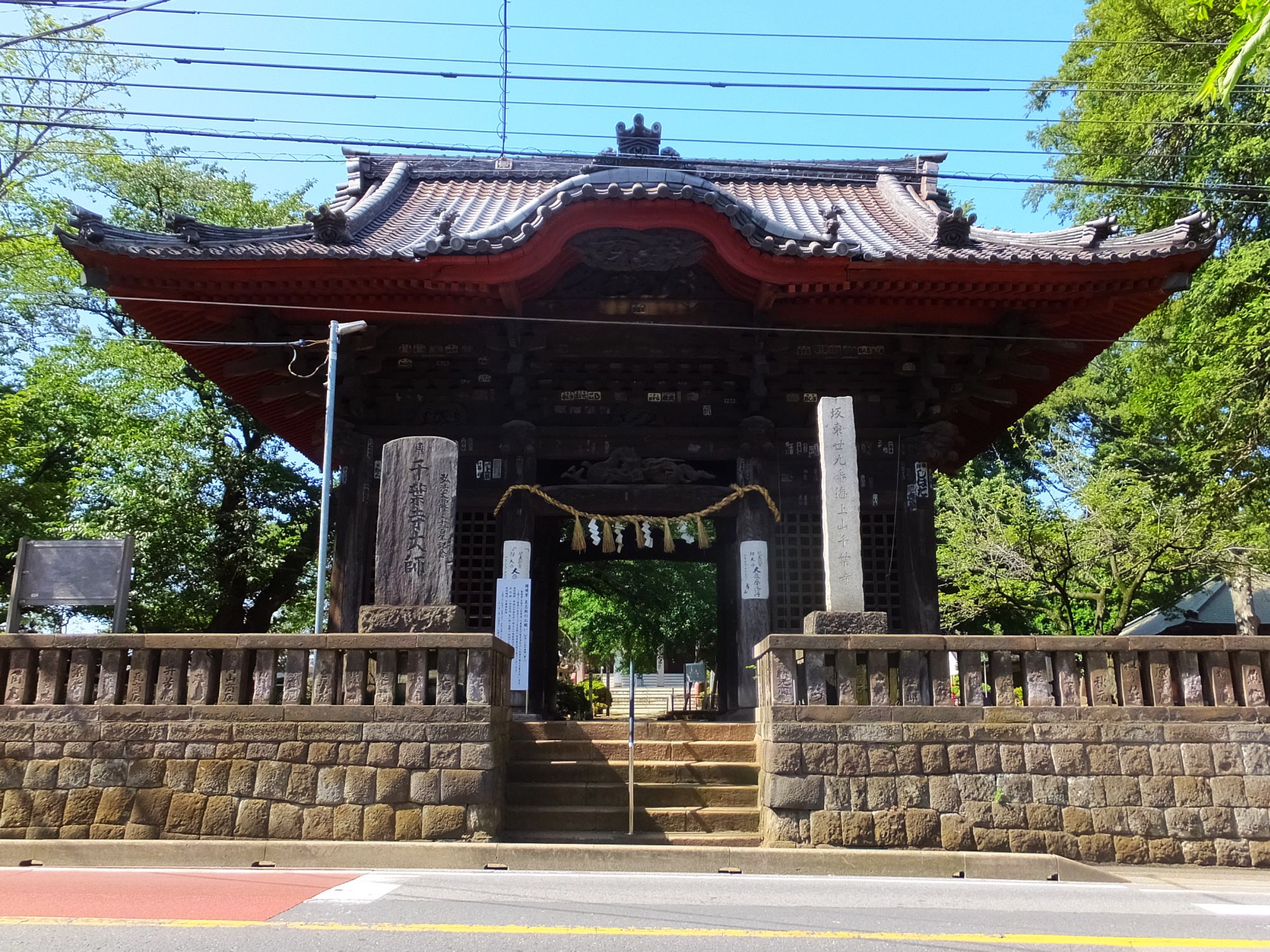
- Niōmon Gate of Chiba-dera

- Location within Chiba Prefecture Location within Japan

Religion
- Affiliation: Buddhist
- Deity: Jūichimen Kannon Bosatsu
- Rite: Shingon-shu Buzan-ha
- Status: functional

Location
- Location: 161 Chiba-dera, Chūō-ku, Chiba-shi, Chiba-ken 260-0844
- Country: Japan
- Interactive map of Chiba-dera
- Coordinates: 35°35′42.5″N 140°7′54.1″E

Architecture
- Founder: c.Emperor Shōmu
- Completed: c.709

Chiba-dera (千葉寺, Chiba-dera), also known as Senyō-ji (千葉寺), is a Buddhist temple in the city of Chiba, Chiba Prefecture, Japan. The temple is located in the central Chūō District in the city of Chiba. Chiba-dera is one of many Buddhist temples in the region that, according to tradition, was established by the priest Gyōki (668–749). Chiba-dera is a temple of the Shingon-shu Buzan-ha, and its honzon is a Jūichimen Kannon Bosatsu. The temple is the 29th stop on the Bandō Sanjūsankasho pilgrimage route.

== History ==
=== Founding ===
The site of Chiba-dera has been used as a Buddhist temple since the early 8th century. Glazed kawara roof tiles from Buddhist structures have been uncovered within the keidai temple precinct of Chiba-dera that date to the early Nara period (710–794). Archaeological excavations in the 1950s estimated the former temple grounds to be approximately 126 square meters. By temple legend the priest Gyōki (660–721) visited the temple site, which was then in the village of Ikeda, Chiba District, Shimōsa Province, in the reign of the Empress Genmei. Gyōki was moved by the large lotus flowers, an important symbol in the Buddhist tradition, and rested at the spot. The priest had a vision of the Kannon Boddhisatva, and carved and enshrined two statues of the Jūichimen Kannon at the spot in 709. This marks the traditional date of the founding of the temple. Gyōki reported this story to the Emperor Shōmu (701–756), a vigorous patron of the Buddhist faith, who then ordered the construction of a shichidō garan complete temple complex with a monks' quarters (僧坊, sōbō) on the site. The Emperor Shōmu named the temple Kaishōzan Kanki-in Shōren Senyō-ji (海照山歡喜院青蓮千葉寺)

=== Heian to Edo periods ===
Archaeological evidence suggest the site was used for burials from the early Heian period, and sutra mounds from this period reveal 経筒 (kyōzutsu) containers to hold hand-copied Buddhist scripture, fragments of white porcelain, Buddhist statuary, and glass beads produced in China during the Song dynasty (960–1279). The temple's buildings were destroyed by fire in 1160. Due to its proximity to Inohana Castle (also known as Chiba Castle), the stronghold of the local Chiba clan, the temple became the clan's bodaiji. According to the Chiba-shū, the history of the clan, the Chiba clan used Chiba-dera as a place to conduct rites and rituals related to the clan. Chiba-dera further benefited from the patronage of Minamoto no Yoritomo, (1147–1199). Yoritomo, after his defeat at the Battle of Ishibashiyama in 1180, sought allies in the Kantō region. Yoritomo prayed daily at Chiba-dera while forging an alliance with the Chiba clan. In recognition of the fulfillment of his prayers for military success and the aid of the Chiba clan, Yoritomo commissioned an extensive renovation of Chiba-dera in 1182 with the establishment of the Kamakura shogunate. The Chiba clan also commissioned structures and Buddhist implements over its long association with the temple, some of which survive and have been designated National Treasures of Japan. The clan invited numerous Buddhist priests and scholars to Chiba-dera, especially from the Tendai sect. In this period the temple became known as a regional center of learning. The clan continued to maintain the temple, but were destroyed in the Sengoku period after siding against Toyotomi Hideyoshi at the Siege of Odawara in 1590.

=== Edo period ===
Chiba-dera declined greatly after the fall of the Chiba clan. Tokugawa Ieyasu (1543–1616), recognizing that the temple was near collapse in the disorder of the period, restored the temple and rebuilt the burnt buildings Members of the Tokugawa clan visited and worshiped at Chiba-dera, and the temple received a 100 koku stipend in the early 17th century. Tokugawa Hidetada (1579–1632), the second Tokugawa shōgun, built a new large-scale Kannon-dō (観音堂) main hall in 1623. Despite this patronage Chiba-dera suffered numerous disastrous fires and subsequent reconstruction in the Edo period (1603–1868), notably in 1689, 1806, and 1852. The current Sanmon gate dates from 1842.

=== Modern history ===
Chiba-dera fell into steep decline after the Meiji Restoration in 1868. The temple lost its rice stipend, its main source of income. Property was confiscated from Chiba-dera in 1869 under Shinbutsu bunri laws mandating the separation of Shintoism from Buddhism. The temple had no resident priest for much of the Meiji period (1868–1912). Supporters of the temple slowly restored Chiba-dera in the early 20th century. The temple was nearly completely destroyed by fire in World War II. Aerial bombings of Chiba City was carried by the United States as part of the wider bombing of Tokyo in 1945. On August 6, 1945, the temple was significantly damaged by aerial bombardments, and the Kannon-dō built by Tokugawa Hidetada in 1623 was completely destroyed. In 1976 the temple celebrated the construction and opening of the current Kannon-dō.

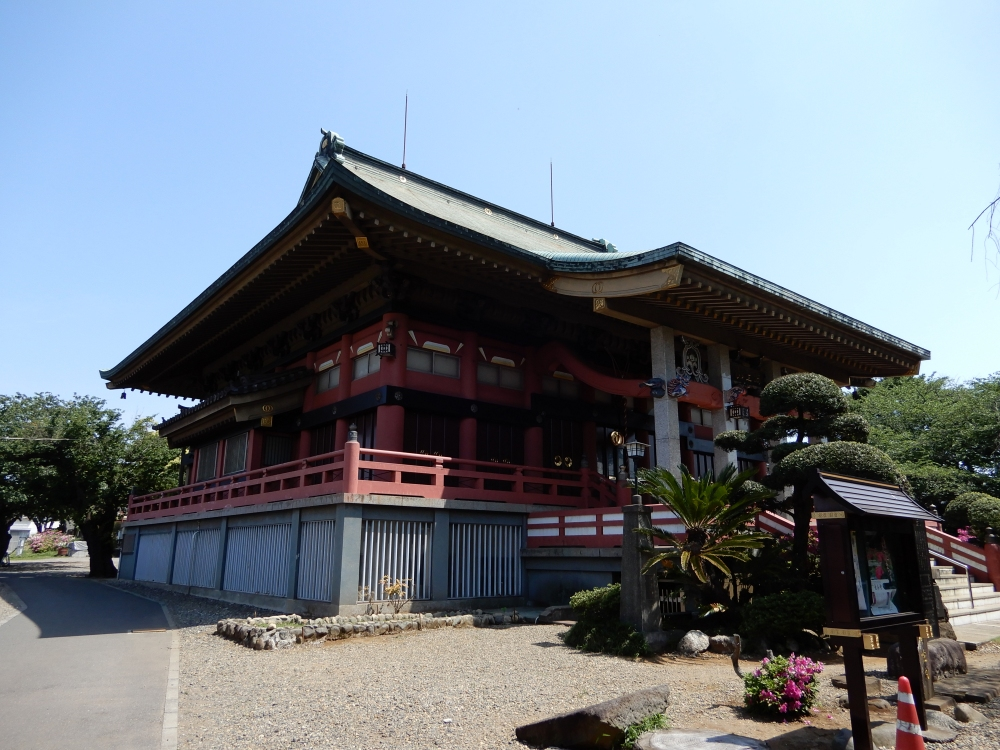
Hondo

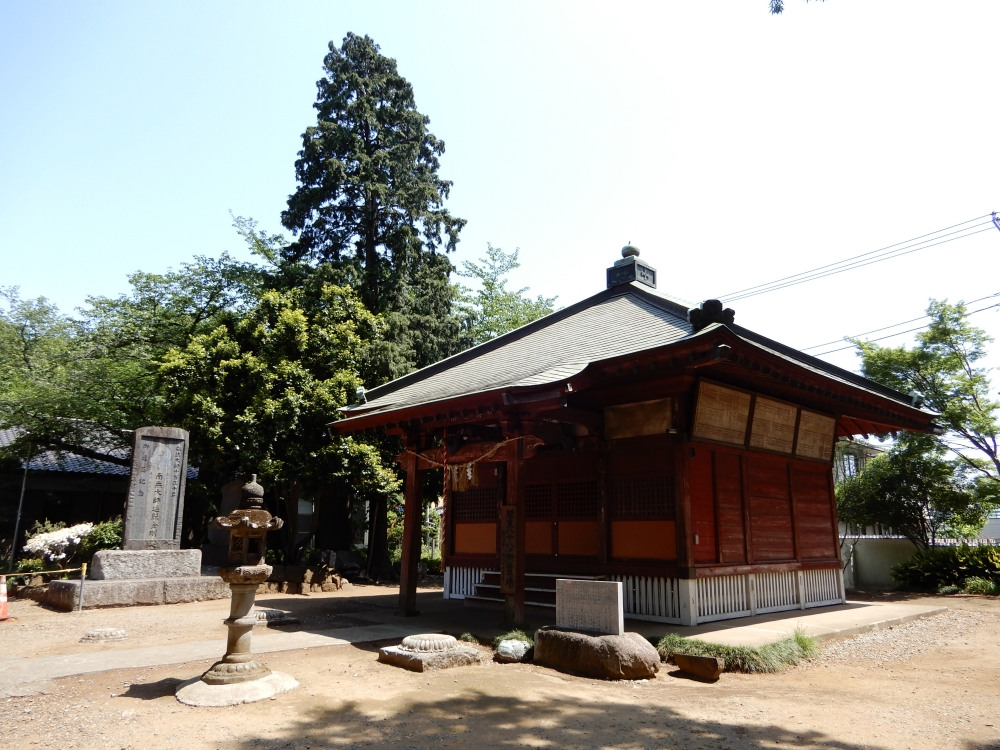
Taishi-dō

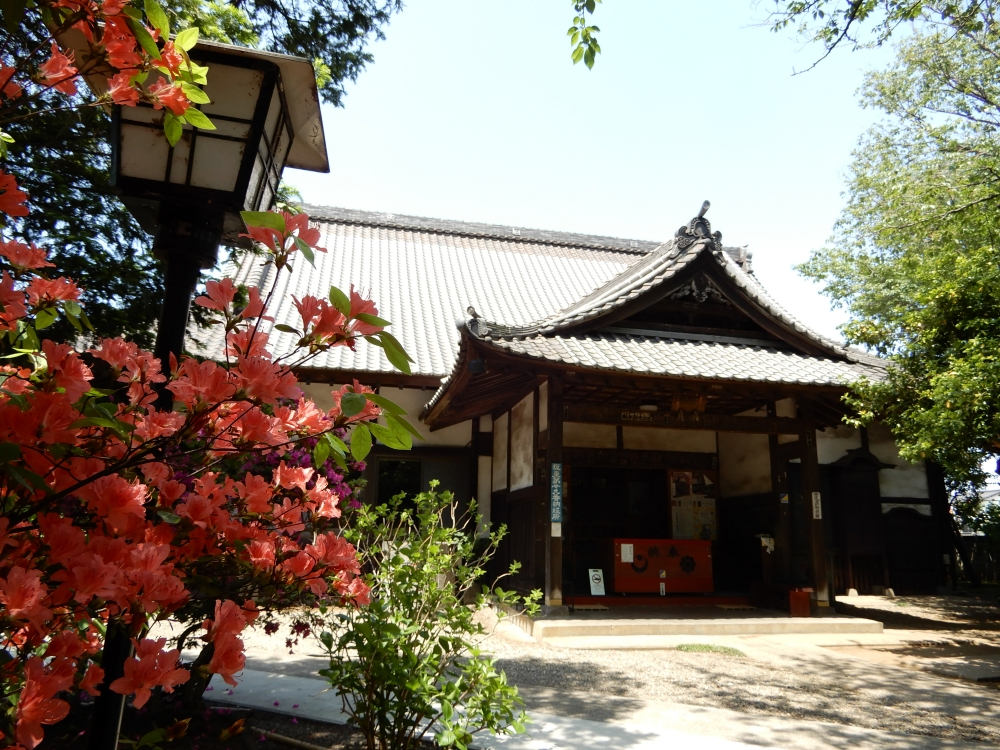
Sutra library

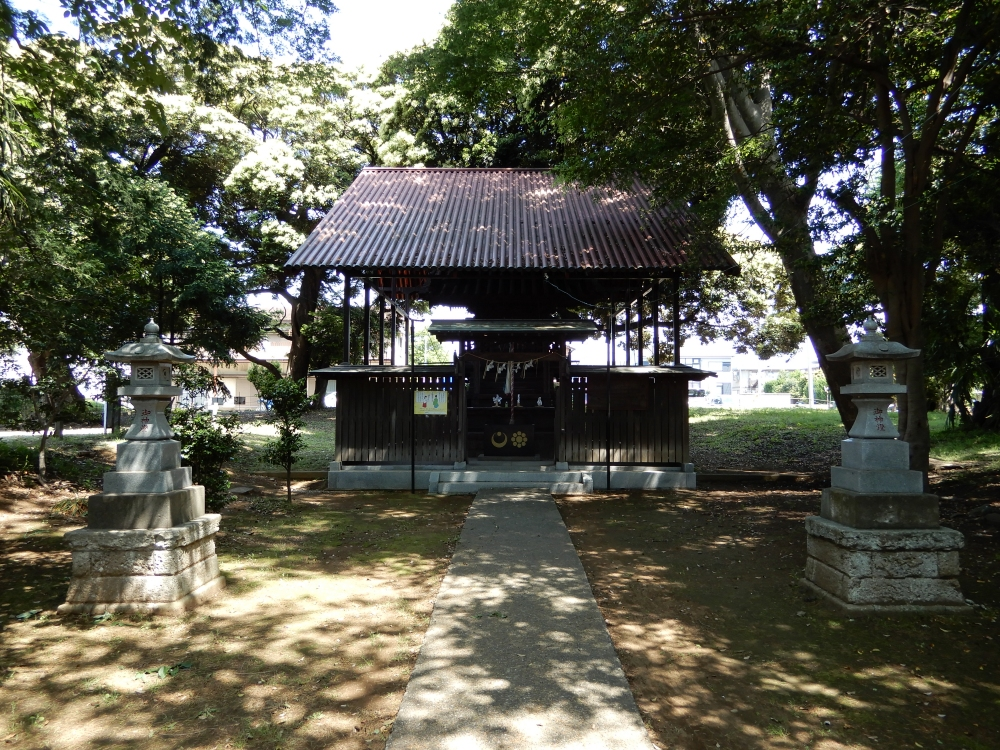
Ryūzō Jinja

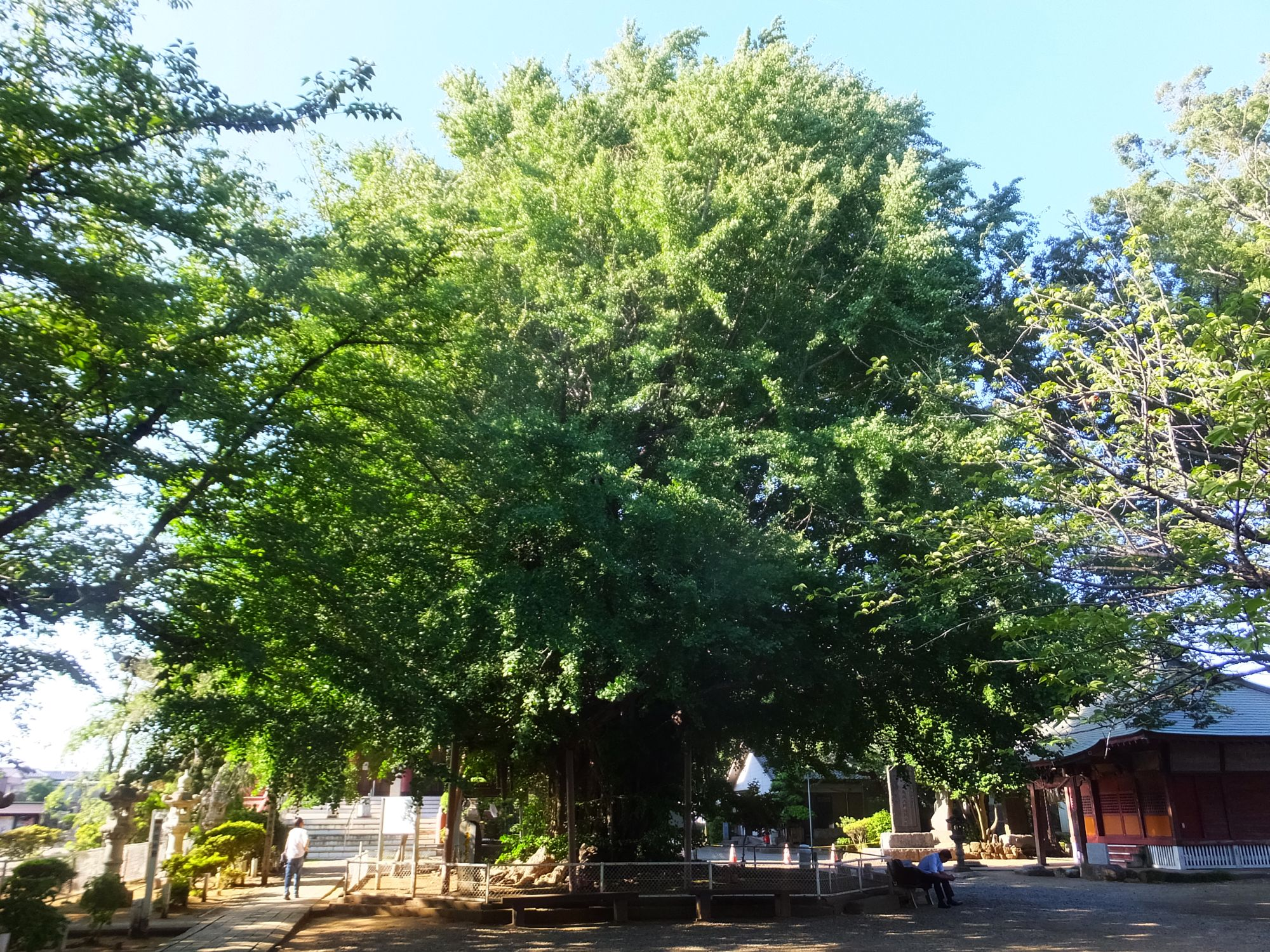
Chiba-dera Ginkgo tree

== Chiba-dera in folklore ==
=== Chiba-warai ===
In the Edo period a local custom existed whereby local residents donned masks on New Year's Eve, gathered at Chiba-dera, and called out complaints and used abusive languages in reference to local administrators and merchants. Chiba-warai was performed by people of all classes, men and women, young and old. Sarcastic comments were followed by loud laughter, hence the name Chiba-warai (千葉笑い). At midnight the Chiba-warai ended and villagers would begin the New Year celebration. Tomokiyo Oyamada (1783–1847) described the practice in the Sōma nikki. The practice of Chiba-warai existed into the Meiji period.

The poet Kobayashi Issa (1763–1827) wrote a haiku on the Chiba-warai.

千葉寺や 隅に子どもも むり笑ひ
Chibadera ya sumini kodomo mo muriwarai
Chiba-dera / In corners even children / Laughing irrationally

=== Modori-gane ===
The "Modori-gane" (Return Bell) is said to have been found in the temple's shōrō, bearing an inscription dated December 22, 1261. The "Soma Diary" states, "When it was sent to Edo for recasting, it began to ring by itself, yelling, 'Chiba-dera, Chiba-dera,' so it was returned in fear, and so it came to be called the "Modori-gane" (Return Bell)." The bell's whereabouts became unknown after the Bunka era (1804-1817).

== Cultural Properties ==
=== Chiba Prefetural Natural Monument ===
Chiba-dera is home to a large ginkgo tree. It stands at over 30 m (98 ft) tall and the trunk has a width of 8 m (26 ft). The ginkgo of Chiba-dera is estimated to be 1,000 years old. The tree has been designated a Natural Monument (天然記念物, tennen kinenbutsu) of Chiba Prefecture.
