= Sakaechō Station (Chiba) =

Monorail station in Chiba, Japan

CM16 Sakaechō Station 栄町駅
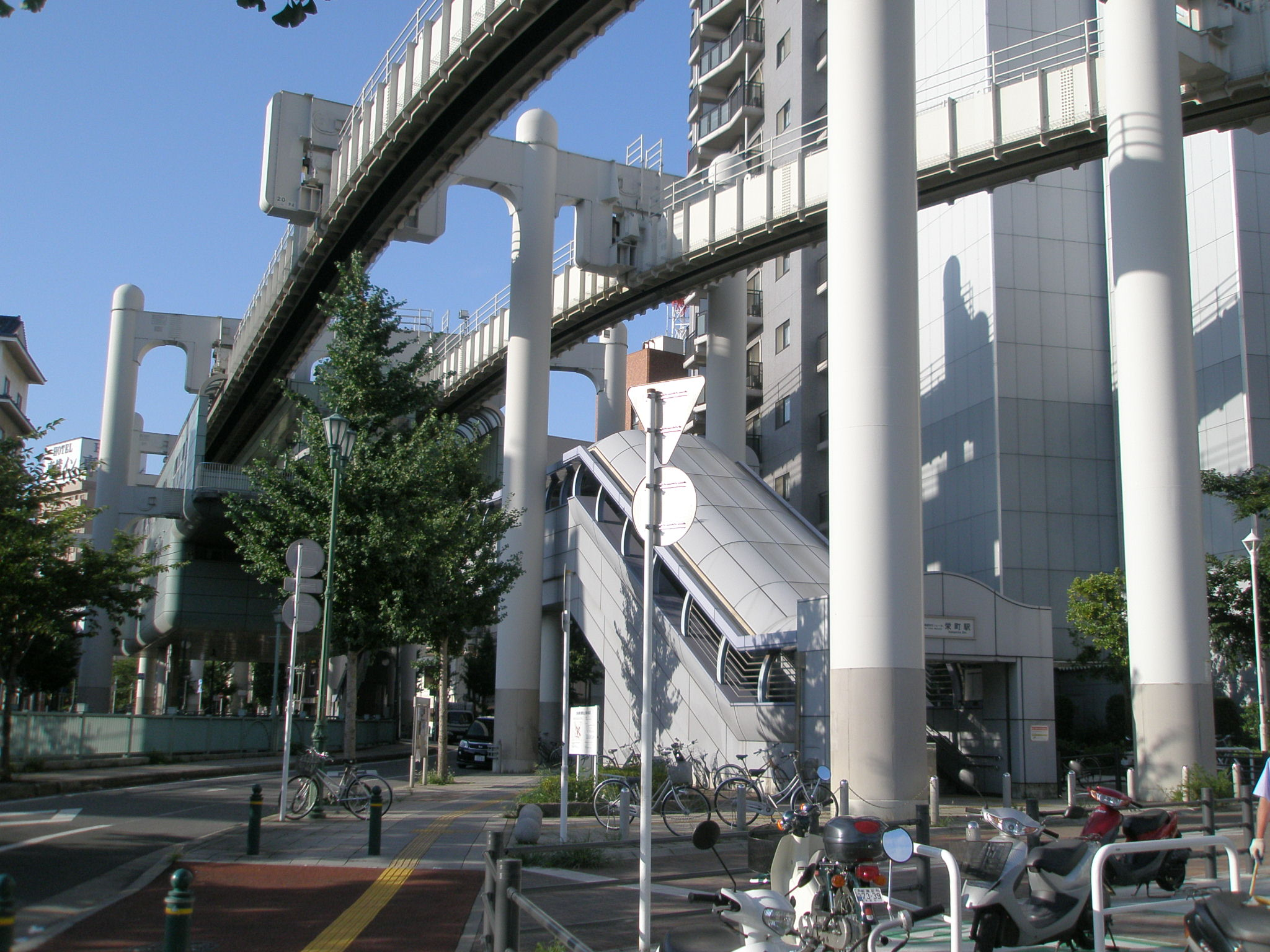
- Sakaechō Station in August 2008

General information
- Location: 29-9 Sakaechō, Chūō-ku, Chiba-shi, Chiba-ken; Japan
- Coordinates: 35°36′46.8″N 140°07′07.0″E
- Operator: Chiba Urban Monorail
- Line: Chiba Urban Monorail Line 1

History
- Opened: 24 March 1999

Passengers
- FY2009: 208 daily

Services
| Preceding station | Chiba Urban Monorail | Following station |
|---|---|---|
| Chiba CM03 towards Chiba-Minato | Line 1 | Yoshikawa-kōen CM17 towards Kenchō-mae |
Location
- Location within Chiba Prefecture Location within Japan

Sakaechō Station (栄町駅, Sakaechō-eki) is a monorail station on the Chiba Urban Monorail in Chūō-ku in the city of Chiba, Chiba Prefecture, Japan. It is located 2.0 kilometers from the terminus of the line at Chiba Station.

== Lines ==
- Chiba Urban Monorail Line 1

== Station layout ==
Sakaechō Station is an elevated station with one island platform serving two tracks.

=== Platforms ===
| 1 | ■ Chiba Urban Monorail Line 1 | for Kenchō-mae |
| 2 | ■ Chiba Urban Monorail Line 1 | for Chiba and Chiba-Minato |

== History ==
Sakaechō Station opened on March 24, 1999.

== See also ==
- List of railway stations in Japan
