= Shukutoku University =

Private university in Chūō-ku, Chiba, Japan

Coordinates: 35°34′25.79″N 140°08′40.70″E

- 淑徳大学
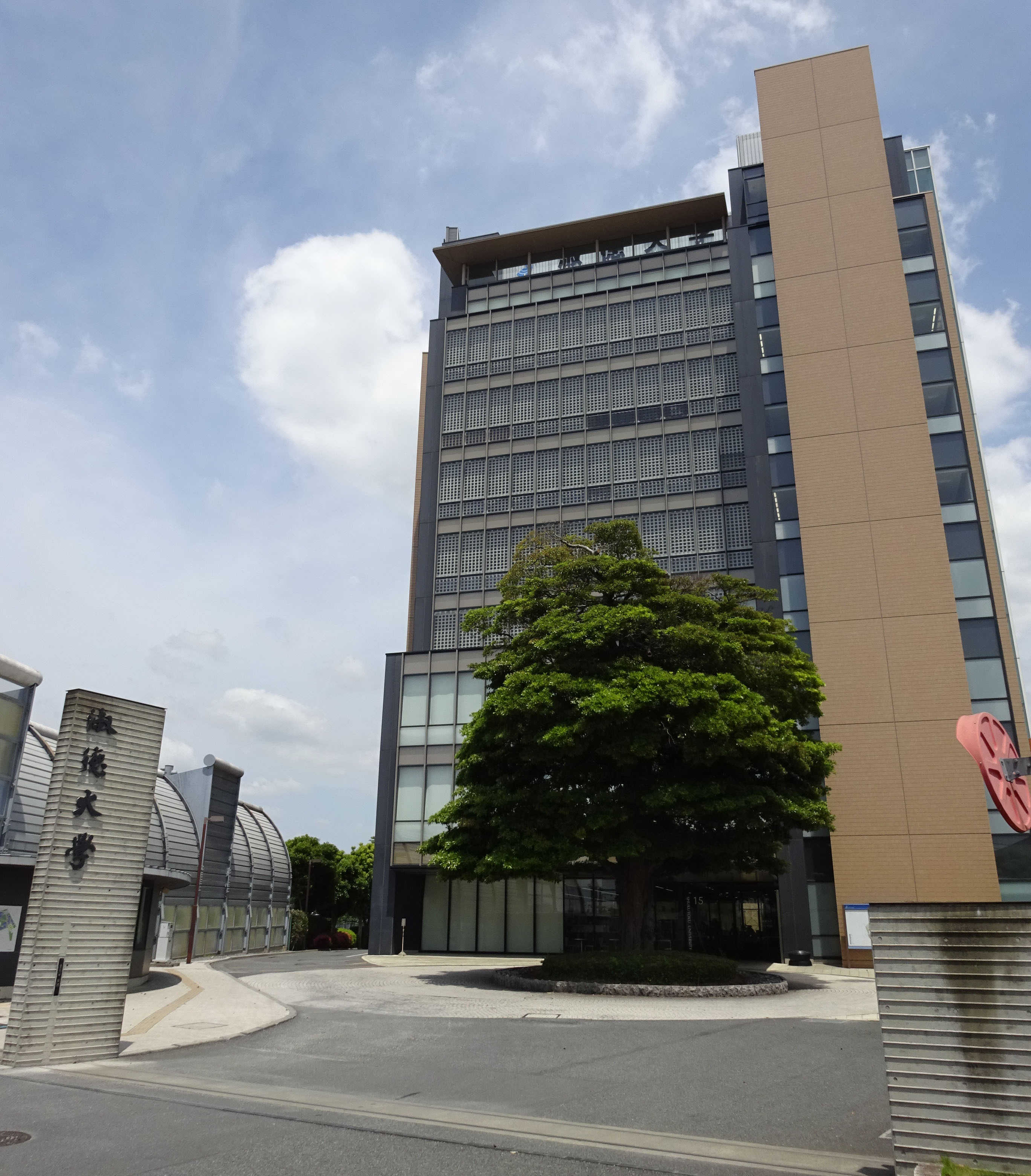
- Type: Private
- Established: 1965
- Location: Chūō-ku, Chiba, Chiba, Japan
- Website: www.shukutoku.ac.jp/english/information/index.html

Shukutoku University (淑徳大学, Shukutoku daigaku) is a private university in Chūō-ku, Chiba, Japan, established in 1965. Ryoshin Hasegawa was the university's first president.
