= Keisei Chiba Station =

Railway station in Chiba, Japan

Coordinates: 35.6117°N 140.1144°E

KS59 Keisei Chiba Station 京成千葉駅
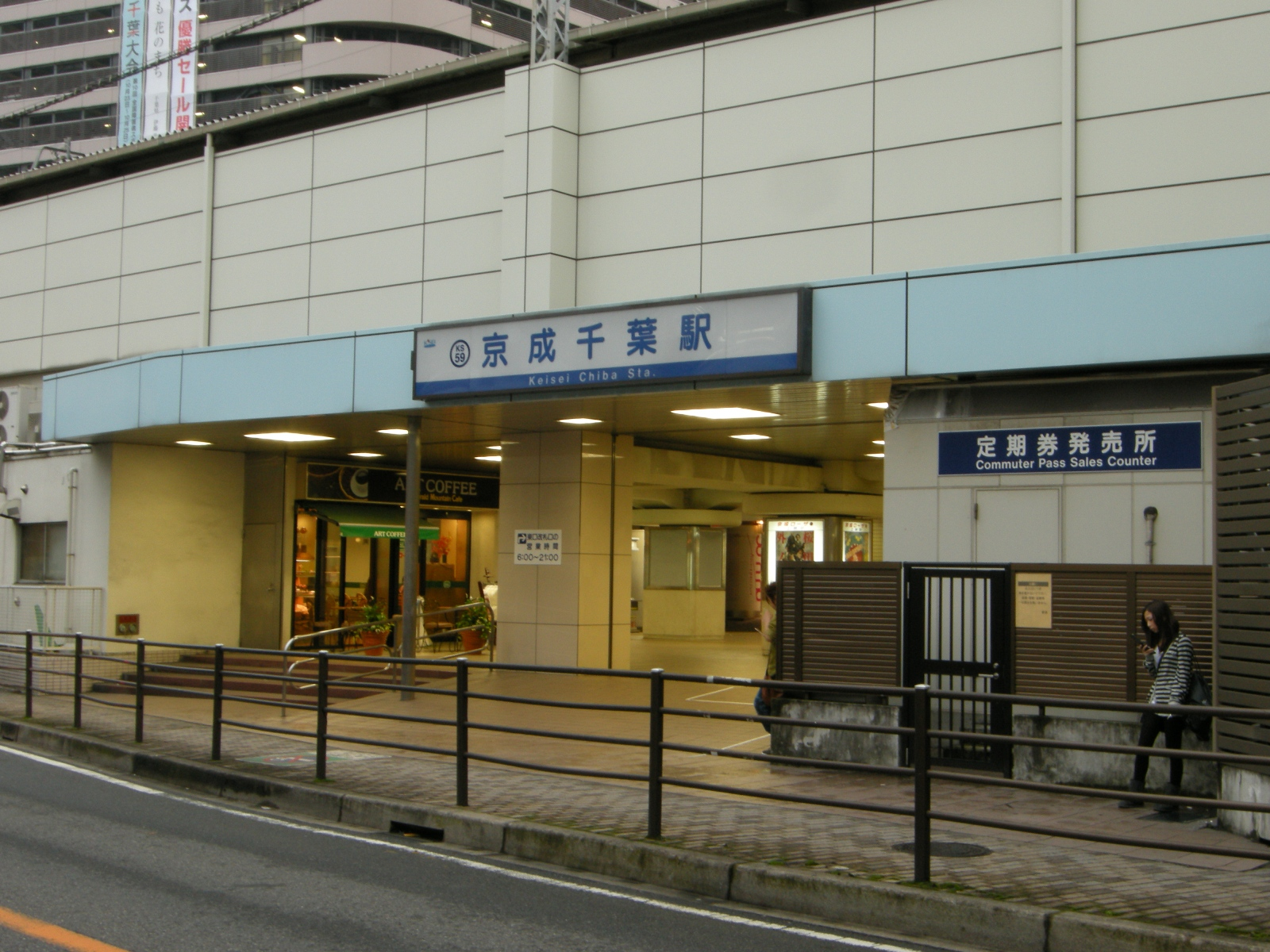
- Keisei Chiba Station

General information
- Location: 250-3 Shinmachi, Chūō-ku, Chiba City, Chiba Prefecture; Japan
- Operator: Keisei Electric Railway
- Line: Keisei Chiba Line
- Connections: Chiba Station

Other information
- Station code: KS59

History
- Opened: 1967
- Former names: Kokutetsu Chiba-eki Mae (until 1987)

Passengers
- FY2008: 24,428 daily

Services
Preceding station	Keisei	Following station
Shin-Chiba KS58 towards Keisei Tsudanuma	Chiba Line	Chiba-Chūō KS60 Terminus
Location

Keisei Chiba Station (京成千葉駅, Keisei Chiba-eki) is a railway station in Chūō-ku, Chiba, Japan, operated by the Keisei Electric Railway.

== Lines ==
Keisei Chiba Station is served by the Keisei Chiba Line, and is 12.3 km from the terminus of the line at Keisei-Tsudanuma Station. It is also connected by escalators and a moving walkway to the Chiba Urban Monorail.

== Station layout ==
Keisei Chiba Station has two elevated opposed side platforms with the station building underneath.

=== Platforms ===
1	Keisei Chiba Line	for Keisei Tsudanuma, Keisei Ueno and Keisei Matsudo Line
2	Keisei Chiba Line	for Chiba-Chūō and Chiharadai

== History ==
Keisei Chiba Station was opened on 1 December 1967 as Kokutetsu Chiba-eki mae Station (国鉄千葉駅前駅, Kokutetsu Chiba-eki mae Station). The station was renamed to its present name on 1 April 1987. The Chiba Express Line (now Keisei Chihara Line) began operations from April 1992.

Station numbering was introduced to all Keisei Line stations on 17 July 2010; Keisei Chiba Station was assigned station number KS59.

== Surrounding area ==
- Chiba Station (JR Lines and Chiba Urban Monorail)
