= Podsosenka train disaster =

1992 train collision in Russia

Details
- Date: 3 March 1992; 5:15 Moscow Standard Time
- Location: Nelidovo, Tver Oblast
- Coordinates: 56°13′48″N 32°34′56″E
- Country: Russia
- Cause: Signal passed at danger

Statistics
- Deaths: 43
- Injured: 108

The Podsosenka train disaster happened on March 3, 1992, at 5:15 (local time) near Nelidovo, Tver Oblast, in Russia.

Passenger train No. 004 en route from Riga to Moscow failed to stop at a restrictive signal, and collided with oncoming freight train No. 3455 at Podsosenka station. The collision of the two diesel locomotives caused a fire, which spread to the passenger cars. Forty-three people were killed and 108 injured.
