= Keisei Chihara Line =

Railway line in Chiba prefecture, Japan

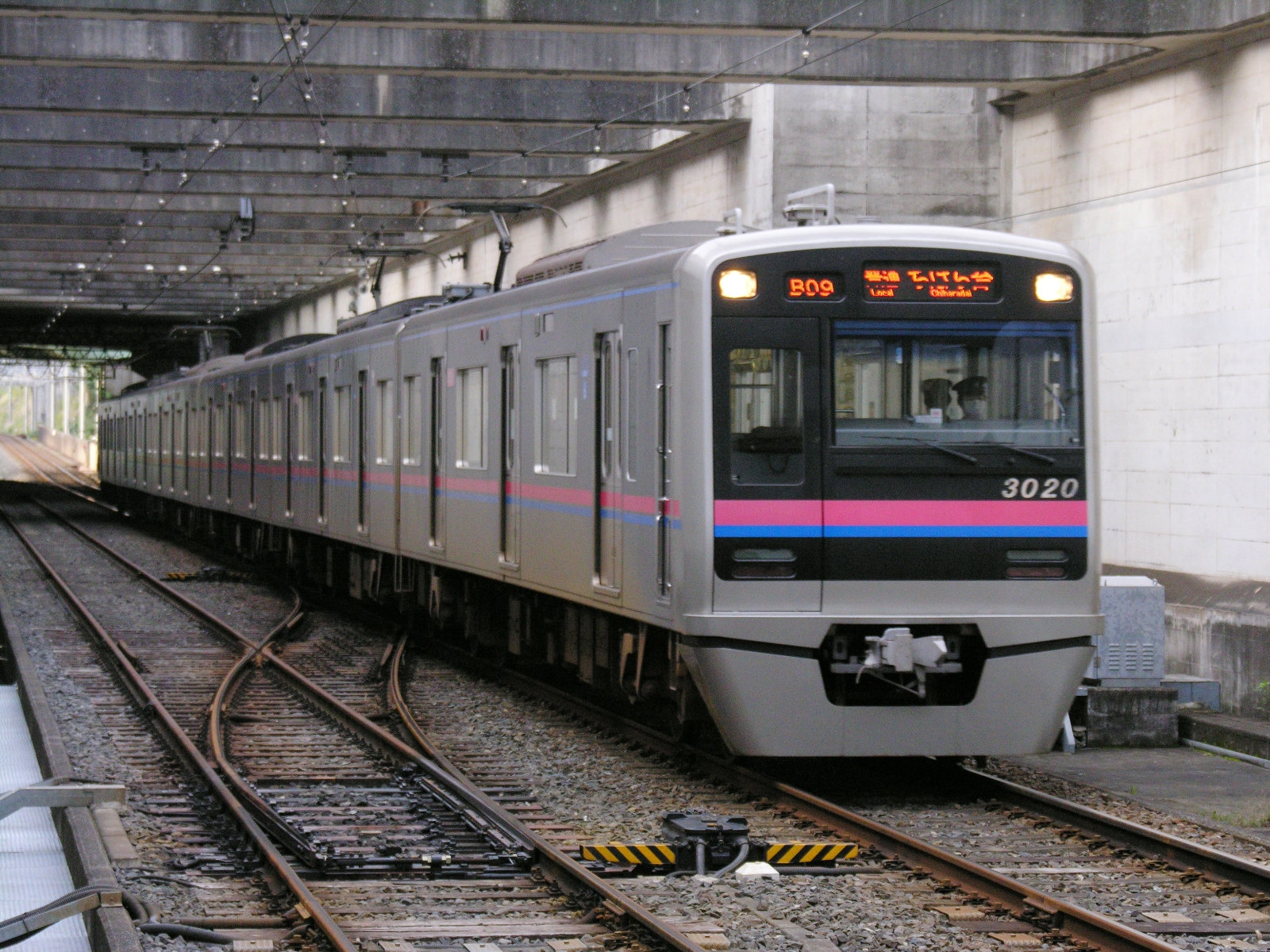
- Keisei 3000 series EMU on the Chihara Line, October 2010

Overview
- Native name: 京成千原線
- Owner: Keisei Electric Railway
- Locale: Chiba Prefecture
- Termini: Chiba-Chūō; Chiharadai
- Stations: 6

Service
- Type: Heavy rail

History
- Opened: April 1, 1992; 34 years ago

Technical
- Line length: 10.9 km (6.8 mi)
- Track gauge: 1,435 mm (4 ft 8 1/2 in) standard gauge
- Electrification: Overhead line, 1,500 V DC

The Keisei Chihara Line (Japanese: 京成千原線, Hepburn: Keisei Chihara-sen) is a railway line in Chiba Prefecture, Japan, operated by the Keisei Railway. The line (with direct services to and from the Keisei Main Line and Keisei Chiba Line) starts from Chiba-Chūō Station and ends at Chiharadai Station.

== Stations ==
All stations are in Chiba Prefecture. All trains are local trains that stop at all stations.

Trains can pass one another at stations marked "◇", "∨", and "∧" and cannot pass at stations marked "|".

No.	Station	Distance in km (mi)		Transfers	Track layout	Location
No.	Station	Between stations	Total	Transfers	Track layout	Location
↑ Through-running to/from Keisei-Ueno via the Chiba and Main lines (mornings/evenings) or Matsudo via the Chiba and Matsudo lines (daytime) ↑
KS60	Chiba-Chūō 千葉中央	—N/a	0 (0)	Chiba Line (through services)	∨	Chūō-ku, Chiba
KS61	Chibadera 千葉寺	2.5 (1.6)	2.5 (1.6)		|	Chūō-ku, Chiba
KS62	Ōmoridai 大森台	1.7 (1.1)	4.2 (2.6)		◇	Chūō-ku, Chiba
KS63	Gakuenmae 学園前	3.1 (1.9)	7.3 (4.5)		◇	Midori-ku, Chiba
KS64	Oyumino おゆみ野	1.5 (0.93)	8.8 (5.5)		|	Midori-ku, Chiba
KS65	Chiharadai ちはら台	2.1 (1.3)	10.9 (6.8)		∧	Ichihara

== History ==
The line was originally planned by Kominato Railway, which obtained the government license for the new line between Hon-Chiba Station in central Chiba and Amaariki Station on the existing Kominato Railway Line in December 1957. Following years of suspension of the project, in December 1975, the license was transferred to Chiba Kyūkō Dentetsu (千葉急行電鉄), which was jointly established by Keisei Electric Railway and the Kominato Railway receiving investment from local governments and other sources.

By the 1970s, the need for the railway had been increasing as the development of Chiba Ichihara New Town was in progress along the planned route. The plan was changed to make connection with the Keisei Chiba Line at Chiba-Chūō Station. Construction of the line began in August 1977 for the section between Chiba-Chūō Station and Chiharadai Station (10.91 km).

Chiba Kyūkō opened the new line between Chiba-Chūō Station and Ōmoridai Station (4.2 km) on April 1, 1992. The line to Chiharadai Station was completed on April 1, 1995. The entire line is single track, but the formation allows for duplication if and when required.

Due to its poor financial condition, Chiba Kyūkō was dissolved and the railway was sold to Keisei Electric Railway on October 1, 1998. Keisei named it the "Chihara Line".
