= Bombing of Chiba in World War II =

The bombing of Chiba (千葉空襲, Chiba kūshū) was part of the strategic bombing air raids on Japan campaign waged by the United States of America against military and civilian targets and population centers during the Japan home islands campaign in the closing stages of the Pacific War, and included two separate air raids in 1945. The second, and larger, air raid of July 6, 1945 is also referred to as the “Tanabata Air Raid”, as it occurred on the night of a traditional festival.

== Background ==
The city of Chiba is a seaport and population center on the eastern fringe of the Tokyo Metropolis. In terms of military significance, it is a prefectural capital and a major regional transportation hub. Its major military targets included a large steel mill operated by Kawasaki Heavy Industries and an aircraft plant operated by Hitachi Aircraft Company. The city had suffered minor damage on April 18, 1942, when it was bombed by one of the B-25 Mitchell bombers of the Doolittle Raid; however, it was bypassed during the Great Tokyo Air Raid of March 10, 1945.

== Air raids ==
=== Air Raid of June 10, 1945 ===
On the morning of June 10, 1945, 100 B-29 Superfortress bombers attacked the Hitachi Aircraft plant in southern Chiba. This plant produced primarily training aircraft for the Imperial Japanese Navy, and aircraft engines, and was also involved in research and design work. The bombers arrived over target at 0745, bombing by radar through cloud cover. The resultant bombing killed 324 civilians in central and southern Chiba, many of whom were children at the Chiba Prefectural Women's High School, which was totally destroyed by the attack.

=== Air Raid of July 6, 1945 ===
On the night of July 6, 1945, 129 B-29 Superfortress from the USAAF 58th Bombardment Wing departed from Saipan. Five aircraft were forced back, but the remaining 124 aircraft arrived over Chiba at 0139 hours and commenced a firebombing attack with 889 tons of E-46 230 kilograms (500 lb) incendiary cluster bombs and 230 kilograms (500 lb) T4E4 fragmentation cluster bombs on the central part of the city from an altitude of 3,000 to 3,500 metres (9,900 to 11,500 ft), lasting until 0305 hours. The E46 incendiary bombs were set to open at 1,500 metres (5,000 ft), releasing incendiary devices on the largely wooden city. The resultant firestorm destroyed 43.5% of the city. The estimated civilian casualties in the July 6 raid was 1,204 killed. The B-29 bombers returned to the Mariana Islands without damage or loss, although 14 aircraft were forced to divert to Iwo Jima due to mechanical problems.

A year after the war, the United States Army Air Forces's Strategic Bombing Survey (Pacific War) reported that 43.5 percent of the city had been totally destroyed by both raids combined.

== See also ==
- Evacuations of civilians in Japan during World War II
