= Chūō-ku, Chiba =

Chūō 中央区
- Ward
- Chūō Ward
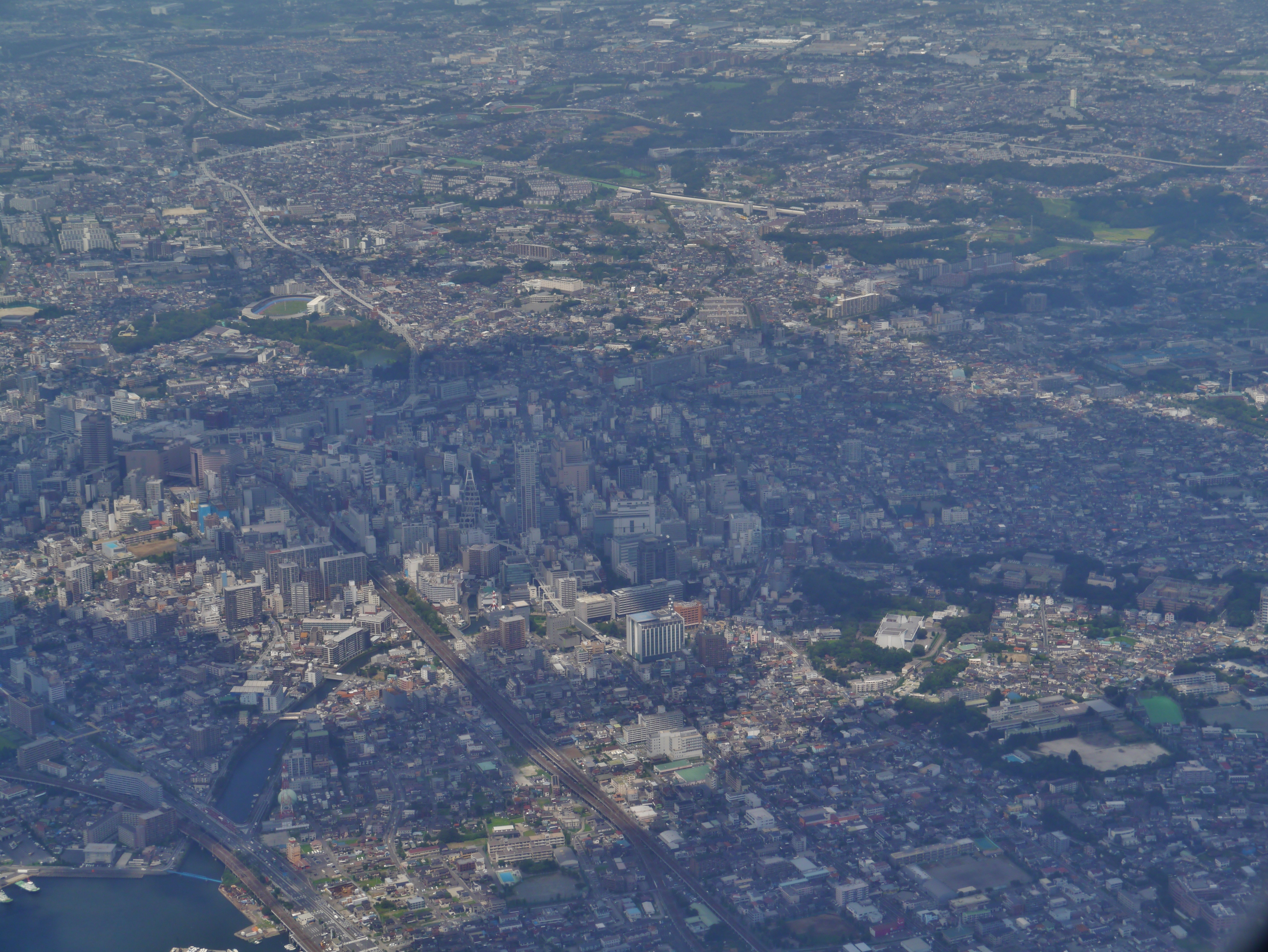
- Aerial photo of Chūō-ku

- Flag Seal

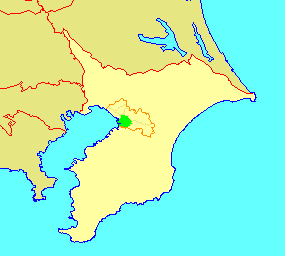
- Location of Chūō in Chiba

- Coordinates: 35°37′14″N 140°08′09″E
- Country: Japan
- Region: Kantō
- Prefecture: Chiba
- City: Chiba

Area
  - Total: 44.81 km^{2} (17.30 sq mi)

Population (April 2012)
  - Total: 200,157
  - Density: 4,467/km^{2} (11,570/sq mi)
- Time zone: UTC+9 (Japan Standard Time)
- Address: 4-5-1 Chūō, Chūō-ku Chiba-shi, Chiba-ken; 260-8733
- Website: Official website of Chūō-ku

Chūō Ward within Chiba

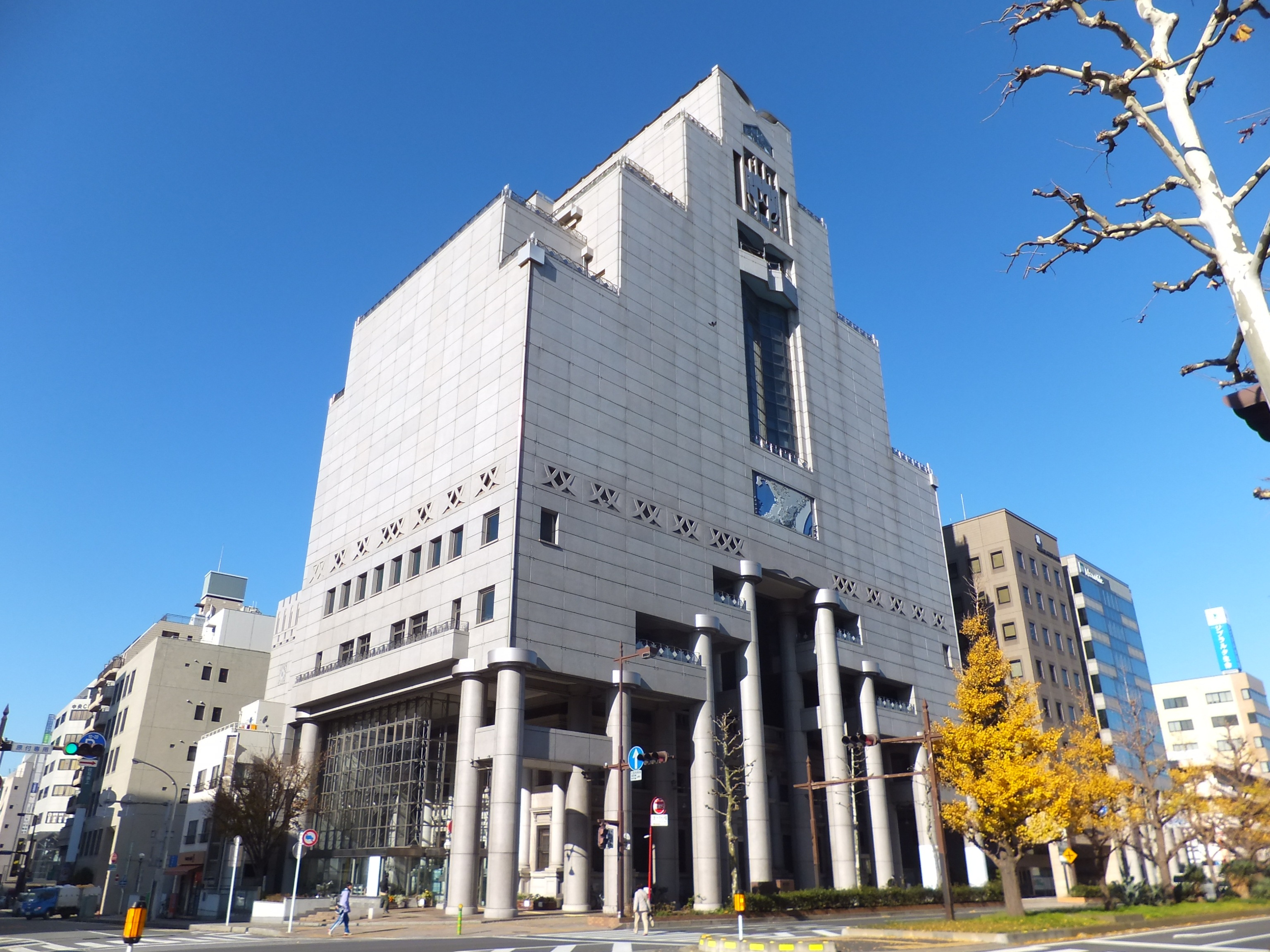
Chūō Ward Office (Dec 10, 2011)

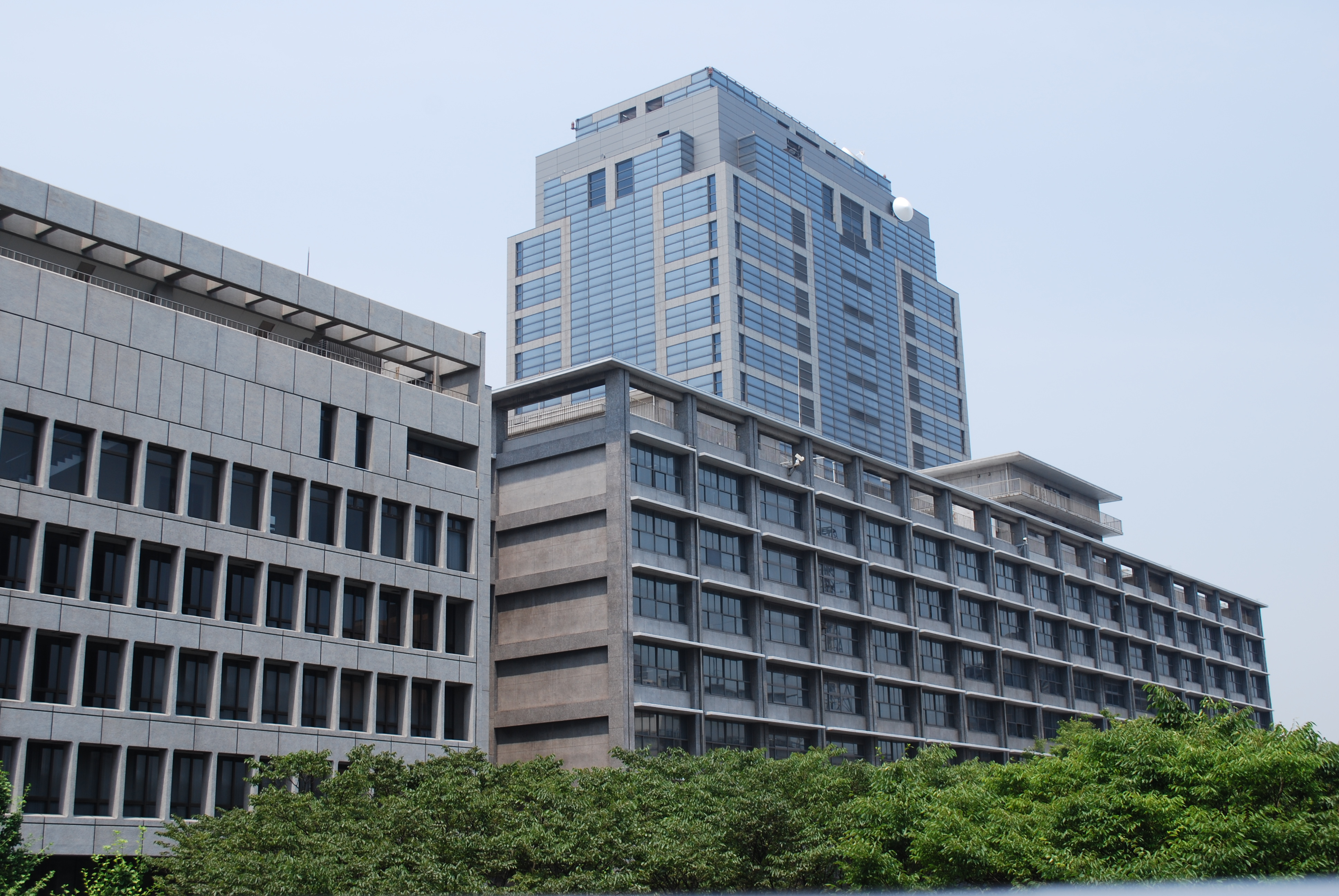
Chiba prefectural offices

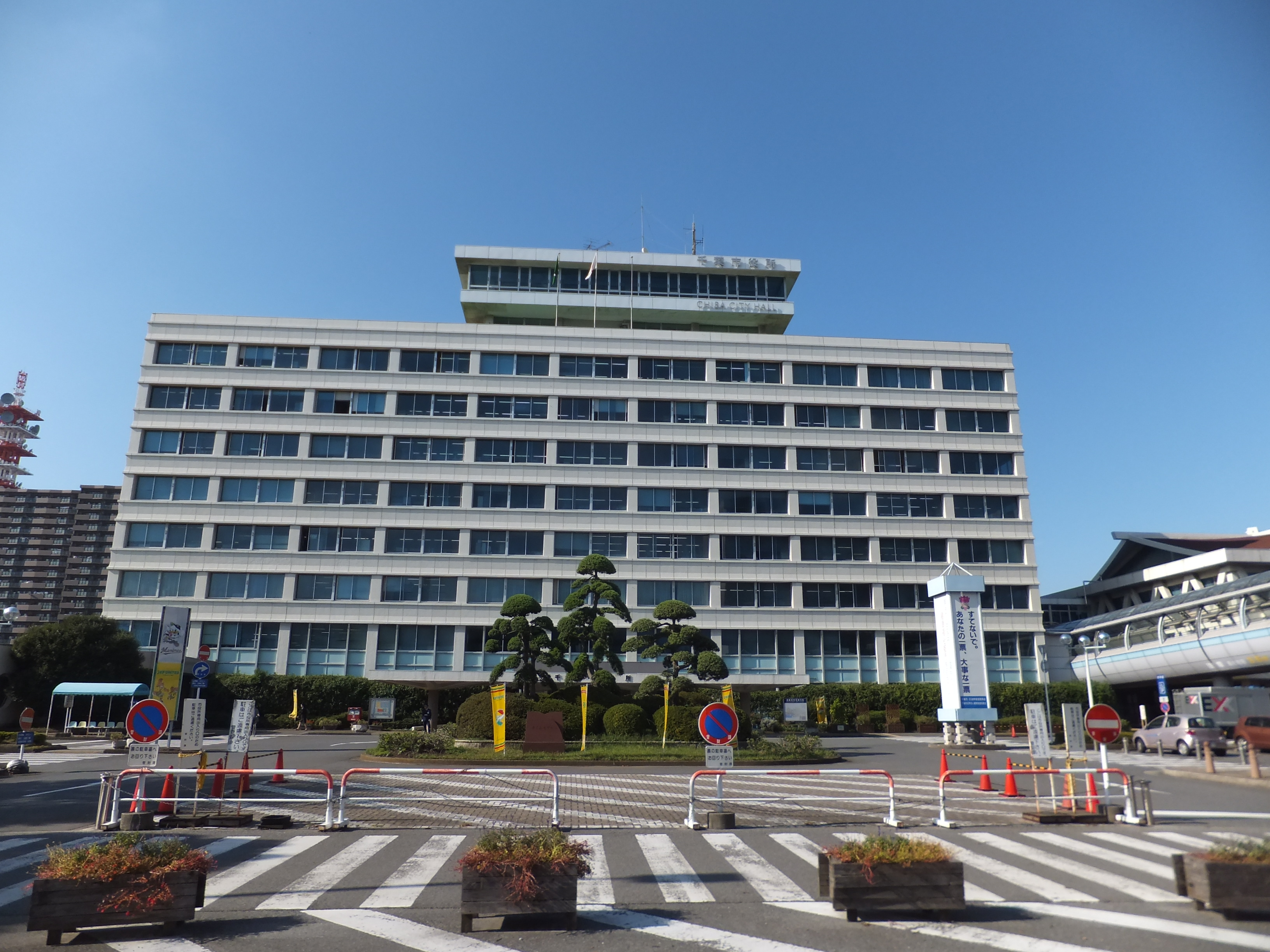
Chiba city office

Chūō Ward (中央区, Chūō-ku) is one of the six wards of the city of Chiba in Chiba Prefecture, Japan, and is the seat of the city government, and the location of the prefectural government offices for Chiba Prefecture. It is also the commercial center of Chiba. As of April 2012, the ward had an estimated population of 200,157 and a population density of 4,470 persons per km^{2}. The total area was 44.81 km^{2}, making it the most populous of the six wards of Chiba city.

== Geography ==
Chūō Ward is located in southwestern Chiba city, facing Tokyo Bay. Much of the coastal area of the ward is built on reclaimed land.

=== Surrounding municipalities ===
- Inage Ward
- Mihama Ward
- Midori Ward
- Wakaba Ward
- Ichihara, Chiba

== History ==
The fortified residence (Inohana Castle) of the Chiba clan was located in the area of present-day Chūō Ward during the Kamakura period. The area was controlled by the Satomi clan during the Sengoku period, and was mostly tenryo territory ruled directly by the Tokugawa shogunate during the Edo period.

After the Meiji Restoration, the area of present-day Chūō Ward was divided on April 1, 1889, into the town of Chiba and villages of Soga, Miyako, Chishiro, and Oihama within Chiba District. Soga was raised to town status on May 23, 1890, and Chiba Town became Chiba City on January 1, 1921. On November 10, 1928, Oihama was raised to town status. The city of Chiba annexed Soga and Miyako on February 11, 1937, followed by Chishiro on February 11, 1944, and Oihama on February 11, 1955.

With the promotion of Chiba to a designated city with additional autonomy from Chiba prefecture and the central government on April 1, 1992, the city was divided into six wards, with the central ward designed Chūō Ward.

== Economy ==
Chūō Ward is the center for industry and commerce for Chiba City. During the post-war era, the area developed largely as a company town to the neighboring steel works of Kawasaki Steel (JFE Steel Corporation).

== Transportation ==
=== Railroads ===
- JR East – Sōbu Line
  - Nishi-Chiba • Chiba • Higashi-Chiba
- JR East – Uchibō Line
  - Soga • Hamano
- JR East – Sotobō Line
  - Chiba • Hon-Chiba • Soga
- JR East – Keiyō Line
  - Chiba-Minato • Soga
- Keisei Electric Railway – Keisei Chiba Line
  - Nishi-Nobuto - Shin-Chiba - Keisei Chiba - Chiba-Chūō
- Keisei Electric Railway – Keisei Chihara Line
  - Chiba-Chūō -Chibadera -Ōmoridai
- Chiba Urban Monorail – Line 1
  - Chiba-Minato - Shiyakusho-mae - Chiba - Sakaechō - Yoshikawa-kōen - Kenchō-mae
- Chiba Urban Monorail – Line 2
  - Chiba • Chiba-kōen

=== Highways ===
- Japan National Route 14
- Japan National Route 16
- Japan National Route 51
- Japan National Route 126
- Japan National Route 357

== Education ==
- Chiba University
- Shukutoku University
- Chiba Meitoku College

Municipal elementary and junior high schools are operated by the Chiba City Board of Education (千葉市教育委員会).

Municipal junior high schools:

- Hoshikuki (星久喜中学校)
- Katsuragi (葛城中学校)
- Kawado (川戸中学校)
- Matsugaoka (松ケ丘中学校)
- Oihama (生浜中学校)
- Shinjuku (新宿中学校)
- Soga (蘇我中学校)
- Suehiro (末広中学校)
- Tsubakimori (椿森中学校)

Municipal elementary schools:

- Benten (弁天小学校)
- Daiganji (大巌寺小学校)
- Honcho (本町小学校)
- Hoshikuki (星久喜小学校)
- Innai (院内小学校)
- Kawado (川戸小学校)
- Matsugaoka (松ケ丘小学校)
- Miyako (都小学校)
- Miyazaki (宮崎小学校)
- Nitona (仁戸名小学校)
- Nobuto (登戸小学校)
- Oihama (生浜小学校)
- Oihama Higashi (生浜東小学校)
- Oihama Nishi (生浜西小学校)
- Omori (大森小学校)
- Samugawa (寒川小学校)
- Shinjuku (新宿小学校)
- Soga (蘇我小学校)
- Tsurusawa (鶴沢小学校)

== Local attractions ==
- Chiba Shrine
- Fukuda Denshi Arena
- Chiba Velodrome
- Kaientai Dojo

== Noted people from Chūō Ward ==
- Yoshinobu Takahashi – professional baseball player
- Toshiyuki Nagashima – actor
- Keiichi Tsuruoka – former mayor
