= Chiba-Chūō Station =

Railway station in Chiba, Japan

Coordinates: 35°36′27″N 140°07′04″E

KS60 Chiba-Chūō Station 千葉中央駅
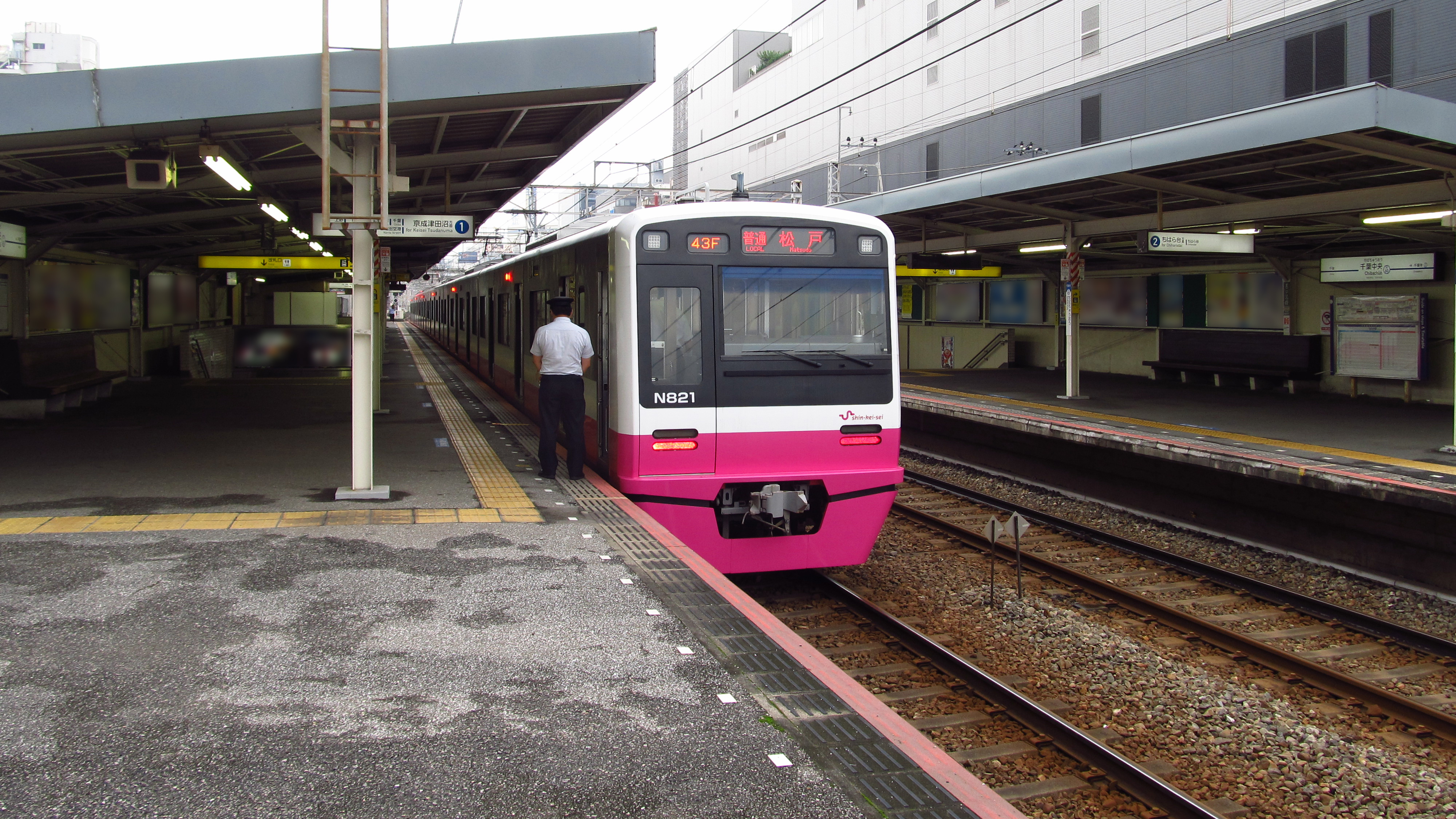
- The platforms in July 2019

General information
- Location: 15-1 Honchiba-chō, Chūō, Chiba, Chiba （千葉県千葉市中央区本千葉町15番1号） Japan
- Operator: Keisei Electric Railway
- Lines: Keisei Chiba Line; Keisei Chihara Line

Other information
- Station code: KS60

History
- Opened: 1921
- Former names: Keisei Chiba (until 1987)

Passengers
- 2008: 15,210 daily

Services
| Preceding station | Keisei | Following station |
|---|---|---|
| Keisei Chiba KS59 towards Keisei Tsudanuma | Chiba Line | through to Chihara Line |
| through to Chiba Line | Chihara Line | Chibadera KS61 towards Chiharadai |
Location

Chiba-Chūō Station (千葉中央駅, Chiba-Chūō-eki) is a railway station operated by the Keisei Electric Railway located in Chūō-ku, Chiba Japan. It is 12.9 kilometers (8.0 mi) from the terminus of the Keisei Chiba Line at Keisei-Tsudanuma Station and is a terminal station for the Keisei Chihara Line.

== History ==
Chiba-Chūō Station was opened on July 17, 1921, as Chiba Station (千葉駅, Chiba-eki). This was renamed Keisei-Chiba Station (京成千葉駅, Keisei-Chiba-eki) on 18 November 1931. The station burned down during the Chiba Air Raid of July 6, 1945. On February 10, 1958, the station was relocated to its present location as part of the post-war reconstruction plan for central Chiba. The tracks were elevated in December 1967 and the station was renamed to its present name on April 1, 1987. The Chihara Line began operations from April 1992.

Station numbering was introduced to all Keisei Line stations on 17 July 2010; Chiba-Chūō Station was assigned station number KS60.

== Lines ==
- Keisei Electric Railway
  - Keisei Chiba Line
  - Keisei Chihara Line

== Layout ==
Chiba-Chūō Station has two elevated opposed side platforms with the station building underneath.

=== Platforms ===
| 1 | Keisei Chiba Line | for Keisei Chiba, Keisei Tsudanuma, and Keisei Ueno; Keisei Matsudo Line for Matsudo |
| 2 | Keisei Chihara Line | for Ōmoridai and Chiharadai |
