= Keisei-Tsudanuma Station =

Railway station in Narashino, Chiba Prefecture, Japan

KS26 Keisei-Tsudanuma Station 京成津田沼駅
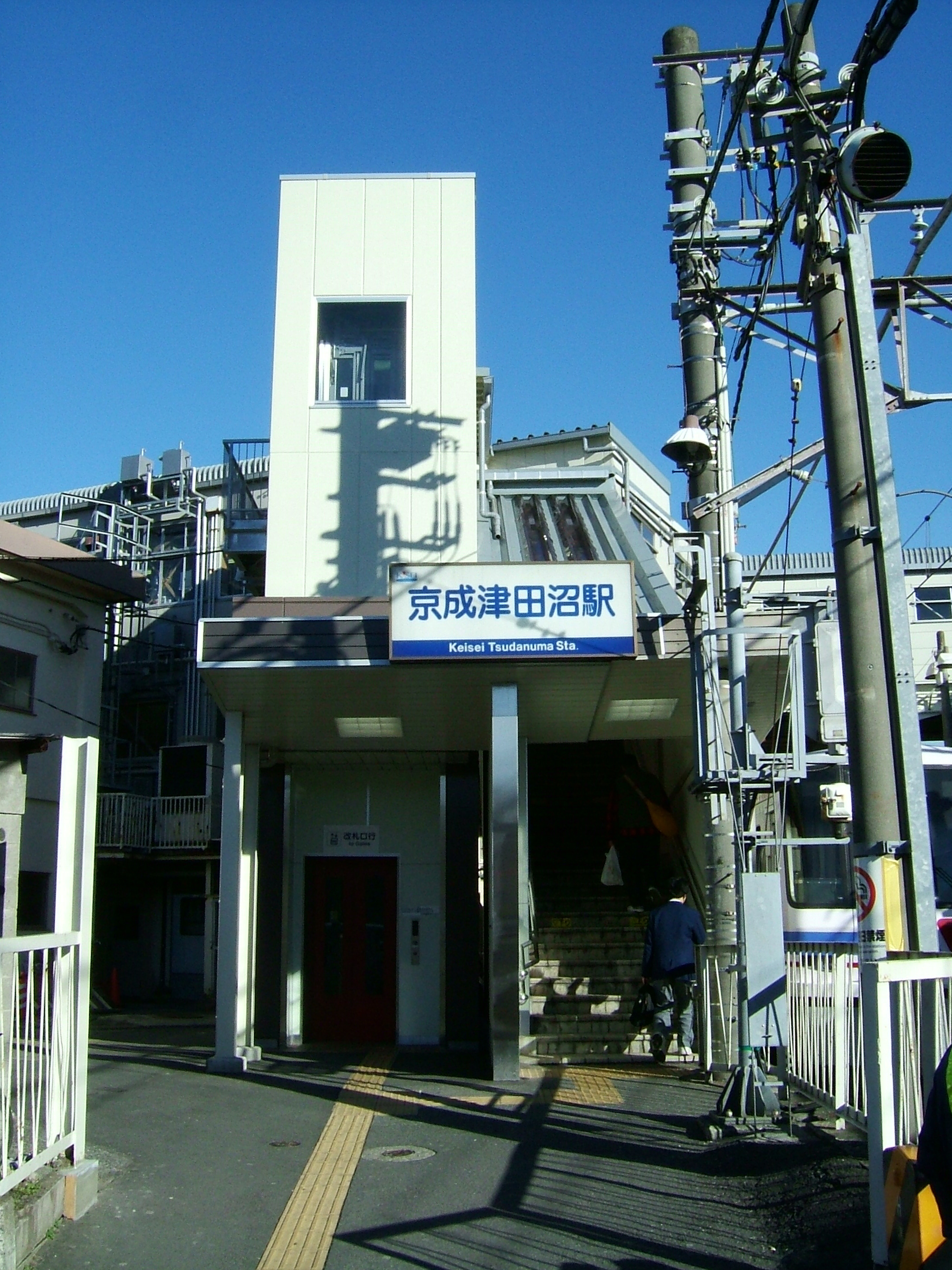
- The north entrance in February 2007

General information
- Location: 3-1-1 Tsudanuma, Narashino-shi, Chiba-ken 275-0016; Japan
- Coordinates: 35.683645°N 140.024459°E
- Operator: Keisei Electric Railway
- Lines: Keisei Main Line; Keisei Chiba Line; Keisei Matsudo Line
- Distance: 29.7 km from Keisei Ueno; 26.5 km from Matsudo
- Platforms: 3 island platforms
- Tracks: 6

Other information
- Station code: KS26
- Website: Official website

History
- Opened: 17 July 1921
- Former names: Tsudanuma (until 1931)

Passengers
- FY2019: 60,394 daily

Services
Preceding station	Keisei	Following station
Keisei Funabashi KS22 towards Keisei Ueno	Main Line Rapid Limited Express Limited Express Commuter Express	Yachiyodai KS29 towards Narita Airport Terminal 1
Funabashikeibajō KS24 towards Keisei Ueno	Main Line Rapid	Keisei Ōkubo KS27 towards Narita Airport Terminal 1
Yatsu KS25 towards Keisei Ueno	Main Line Local	Keisei Ōkubo KS27 towards Narita Airport Terminal 1
through to Main Line & Matsudo Line	Chiba Line	Keisei Makuharihongō KS52 towards Chiba-Chūō
Shin-Tsudanuma KS66 towards Matsudo	Matsudo Line	through to Chiba Line
Former services
Preceding station	Shin-Keisei	Following station
Shin-Tsudanuma SL23 towards Matsudo	Shin-Keisei Line	through to Keisei Chiba Line
Location
- Location within Chiba Prefecture

Keisei-Tsudanuma Station (京成津田沼駅, Keisei-Tsudanuma-eki) is a junction passenger railway station in the city of Narashino, Chiba Prefecture, Japan, operated by the private railway operator Keisei Electric Railway.

== Lines ==
Keisei-Tsudanuma Station is served by the following lines.

- Keisei Main Line
- Keisei Chiba Line
- Keisei Matsudo Line

It is located 29.7 km from the Tokyo terminus of the Keisei Main Line at Keisei Ueno Station, and 26.5 km from the terminus of the Keisei Matsudo Line at Matsudo Station. Keisei-Tsudanuma also forms the terminus of the Keisei Chiba Line.

== Station layout ==
The station consists of three island platforms with an elevated station building.

=== Platforms ===
1, 2	Keisei Main Line	for Keisei Funabashi, Aoto, Oshiage, and Keisei Ueno
3, 4	Keisei Main Line	for Yachiyodai, Keisei Sakura, Keisei Narita, and Narita Airport (Terminal 2·3 and Terminal 1)
3, 4	Keisei Chiba Line	for Chiba-Chūō and Chiharadai
5	Keisei Matsudo Line	for Kita-Narashino, Shin-Kamagaya, and Matsudo
5	Keisei Chiba Line	for Chiba-Chūō, and Chiharadai
6	Keisei Matsudo Line	for Kita-Narashino, Shin-Kamagaya, and Matsudo

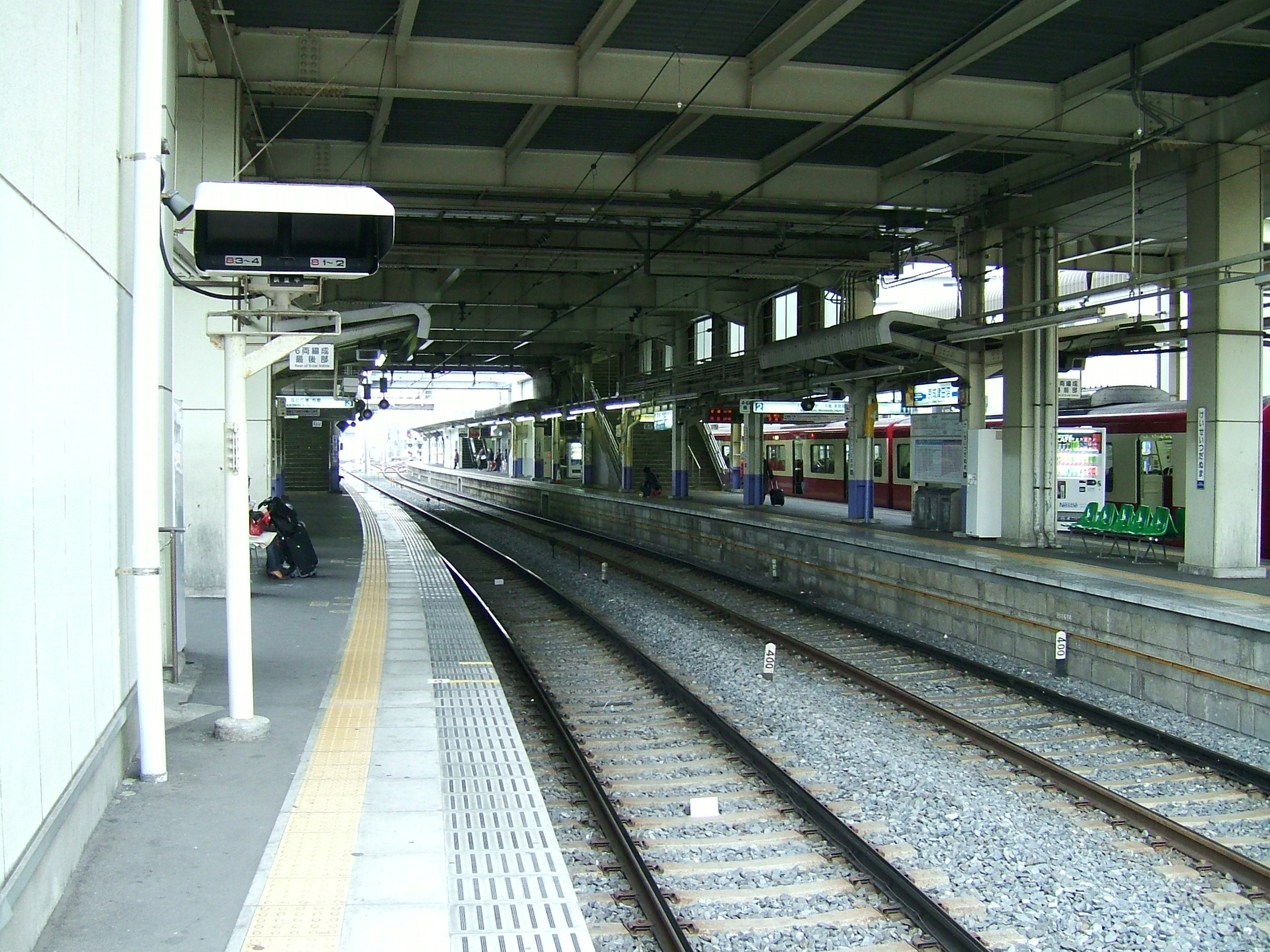
The Keisei platforms in February 2007

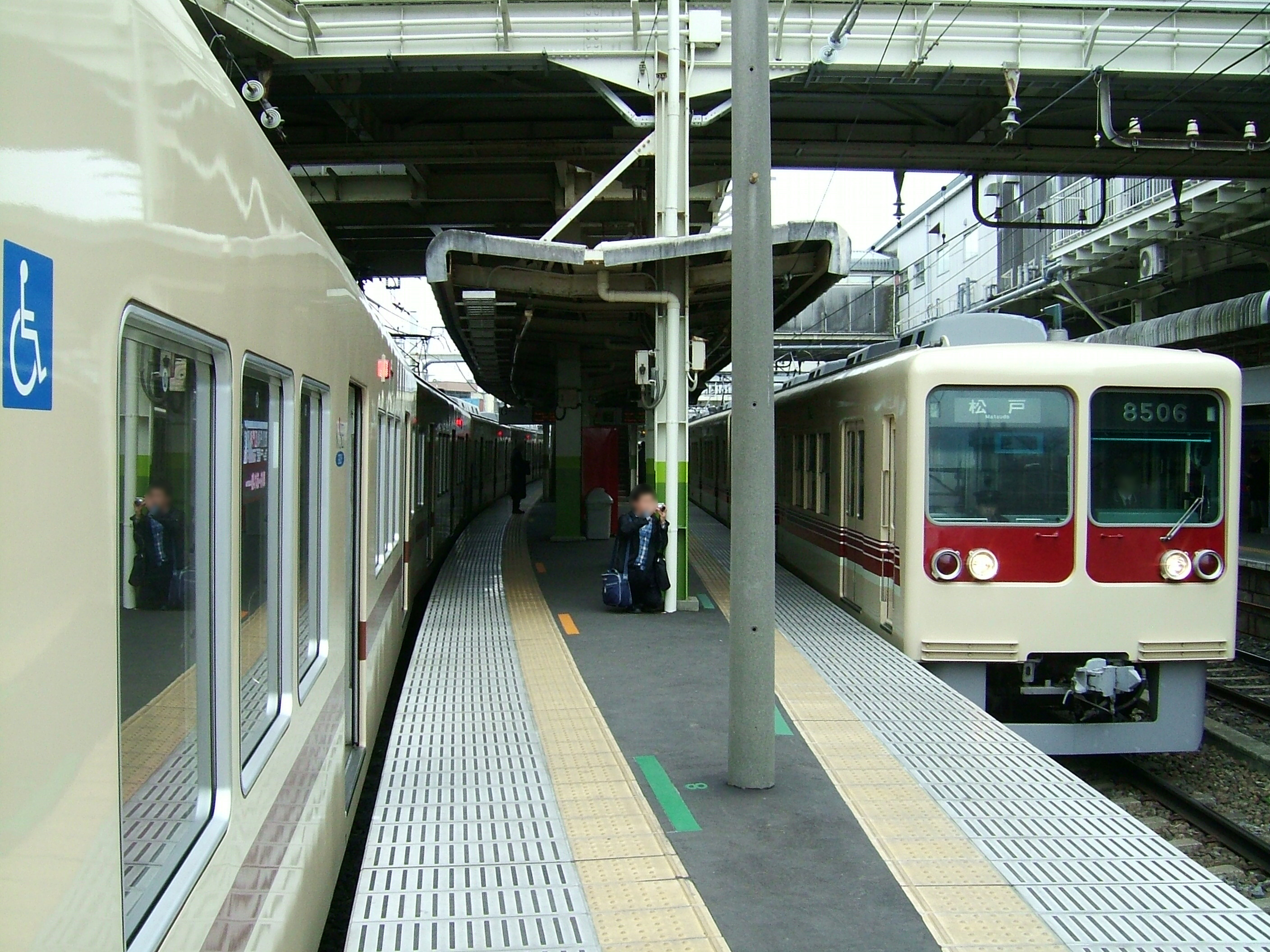
The Shin-Keisei Line platforms in February 2007

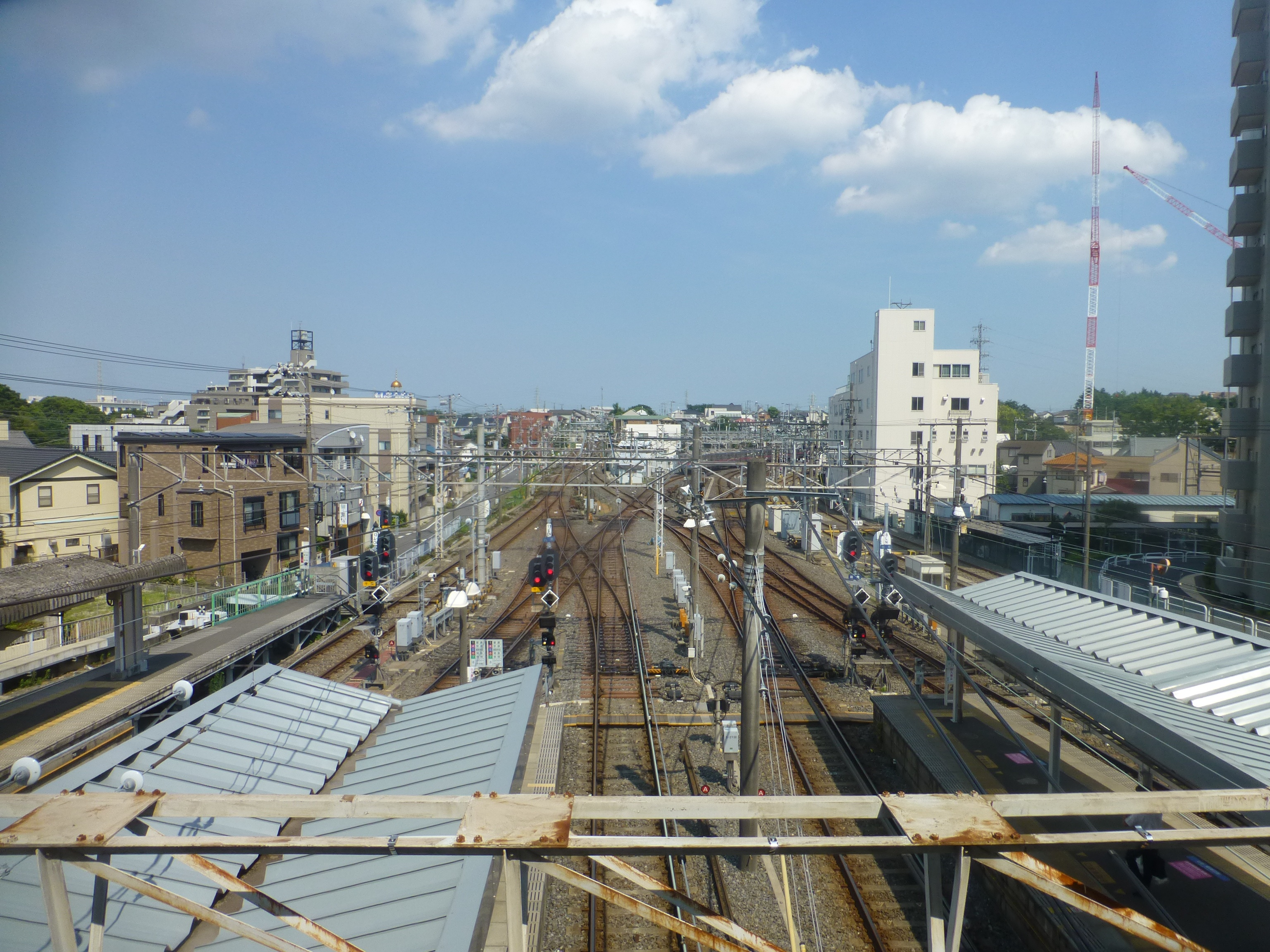
The view from the station looking east in July 2016

== History ==
The station opened on 17 July 1921 as Tsudanuma Station (津田沼駅). It was renamed Keisei-Tsudanuma on 18 November 1931. From 1 November 1953, the Shin-Keisei Electric Railway began operations to the station using the existing platforms, and from October 1957 to its own platform.

Station numbering was introduced to all Keisei Line stations on 17 July 2010; Keisei-Tsudanuma Station was assigned station number KS26.

Effective April 2025, the platforms for the Shin-Keisei Line came under the aegis of Keisei Electric Railway as the result of the buyout of the Shin-Keisei Railway. The move was completed on 1 April 2025.

== Passenger statistics ==
In fiscal 2019, the station was used by an average of 60,394 passengers daily.

== Surrounding area ==
- Narashino City Office

== See also ==
- List of railway stations in Japan
