= Chiharadai Station =

Railway station in Ichihara, Chiba Prefecture, Japan

KS65 Chiharadai Station ちはら台駅
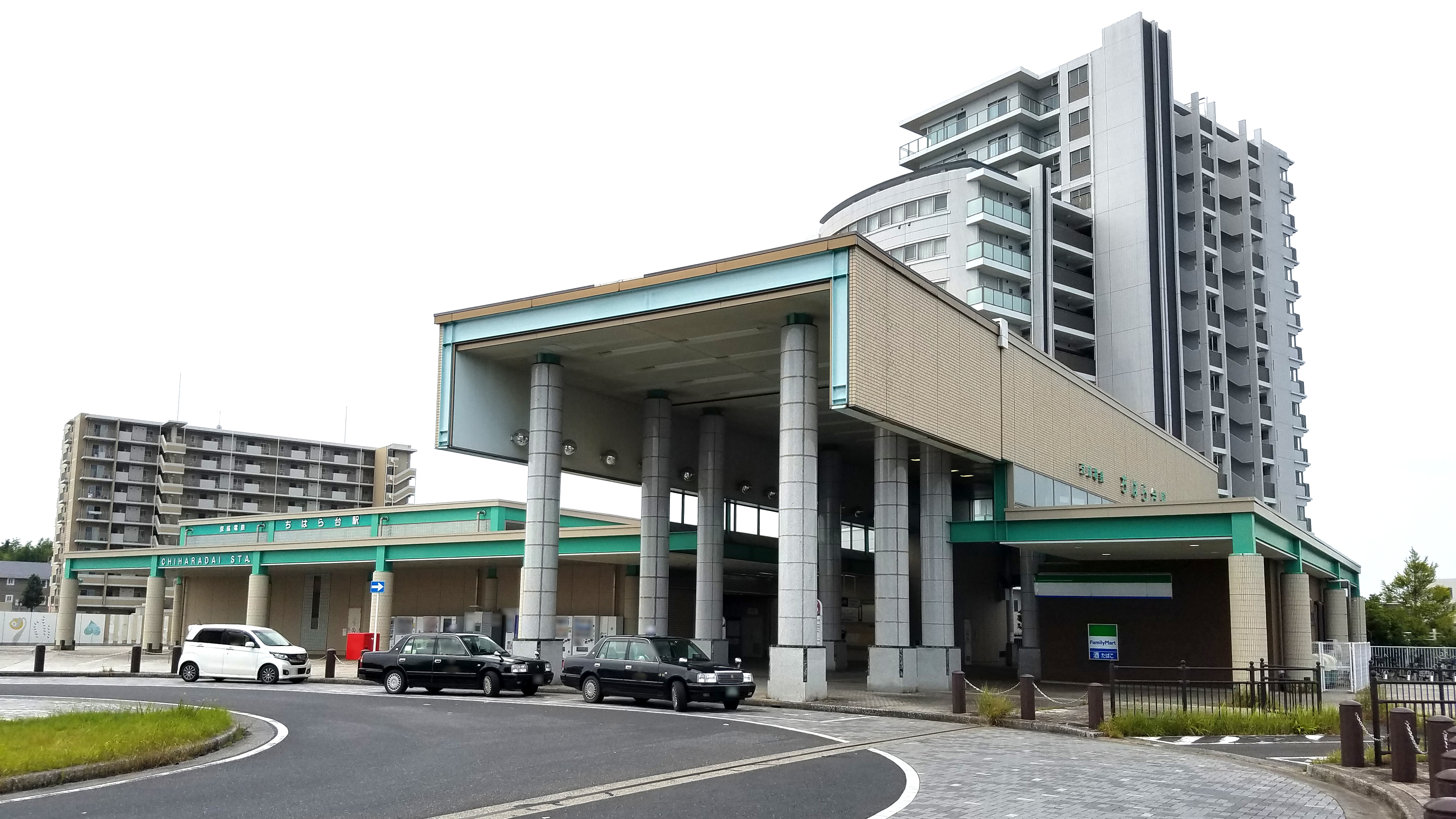
- Chiharadai Station in August 2020

General information
- Location: 7-87 Chiharadai-Nishi, Ichihara-shi, Chiba-ken 290-0143; Japan
- Coordinates: 35.5343°N 140.1705°E
- Operator: Keisei Electric Railway
- Line: Keisei Chihara Line
- Platforms: 1 island platforms

Other information
- Station code: KS65
- Website: Official website

History
- Opened: April 1, 1995

Passengers
- FY2019: 5948 daily

Services
Preceding station	Keisei	Following station
Oyumino KS64 towards Chiba-Chūō	Chihara Line	Terminus
Location
- Location within Chiba Prefecture Location within Japan

Chiharadai Station (ちはら台駅, Chiharadai-eki) is a passenger railway station in the city of Ichihara, Chiba, Japan, operated by the Keisei Electric Railway.

== Lines ==
Chiharadai Station is a terminus of the Keisei Chihara Line, and is located 10.9 km from the opposing terminus of the line at Chiba-Chūō Station.

== Station layout ==
Chiharadai Station has a single island platform located in a cutting, with the ground-level station built overhead. The station is staffed.

=== Platforms ===
1	Keisei Chihara Line	for Chiba-Chūō and Keisei Tsudanuma
2	Keisei Chihara Line	for Chiba-Chūō and Keisei Tsudanuma

== History ==
Chiharadai Station opened on 1 April 1995.

Station numbering was introduced to all Keisei Line stations on 17 July 2010. Chiharadai was assigned station number KS65.

== Passenger statistics ==
In fiscal 2019, the station was used by an average of 5948 passengers daily.

== Surrounding area ==
- Ichihara City Hall Chiharadai Branch
- Kusakari Community Center
- Teikyo Heisei University Chiharadai Campus
- Tachiharadai Nishi Junior High School
- Chiharadaiminami Junior High School
- Minami Junior High School

== See also ==
- List of railway stations in Japan
