= Keisei Bus =

Japanese bus company based in Tokyo and Chiba

Keisei Dentetsu Bus Holdings Co. Ltd.
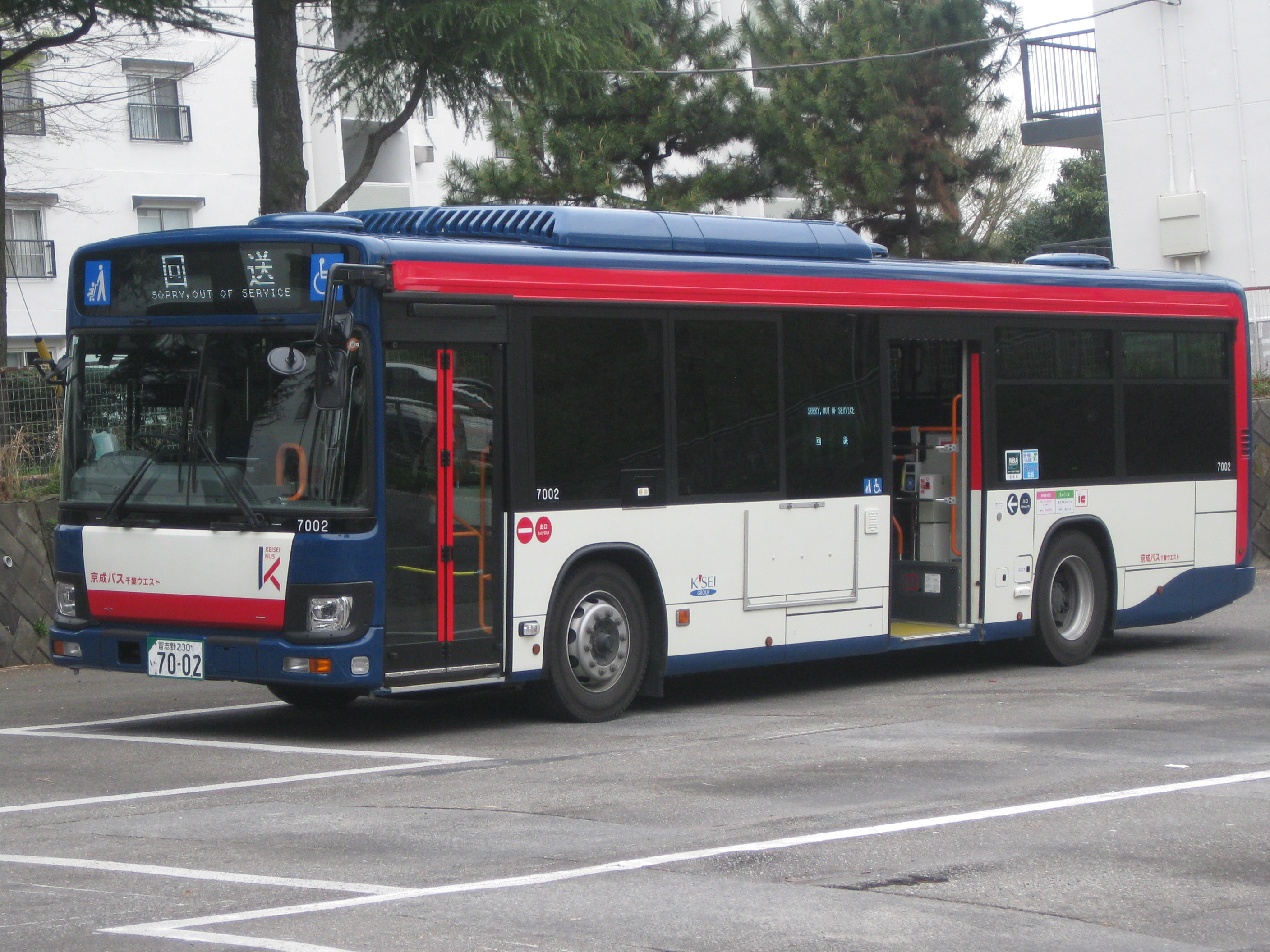
- A Keisei Bus Chiba West bus
- Parent: Keisei Electric Railway
- Founded: 1930 (as Kesei Passenger Car Co.); 2003 (spun off from Kesei Electric Railway); 2024(Current company)
- Headquarters: 3-3-1 Yawata, Ichikawa, Chiba, Japan
- Service area: Tokyo and Chiba
- Service type: Bus
- Fleet: 834 buses (as of July 2017)
- Website: https://www.keiseibus.co.jp/

The Keisei Dentetsu Bus Holdings Co. Ltd. (京成電鉄バスホールディングス株式会社, Keisei Dentetsu Basu Holdings Kabushiki-gaisha) was one of the companies of the Keisei Group, and its subsidiaries are bus companies operating in Chiba Prefecture and eastern Tokyo.

== Keisei Bus ==
The Keisei Bus Co. Ltd. (京成バス株式会社, Keisei Basu Kabushiki-gaisha) is one of the bus companies of the Keisei Group that existed in the past It was established on 1 October 2003 to inherit all business of the Keisei Electric Railway bus department.

In April 2026, due to the reorganization of the Keisei Bus Group, the company as Keisei Bus was absorbed into Keisei Bus Tokyo (formerly Keisei Town Bus) and disappeared. Currently, it operates as Keisei Bus Tokyo, Keisei Bus Chiba West, Keisei Bus Chiba Central and Keisei Bus Chiba East.

At prent, business of this company is that manages capital and property of subsidiaries including Tokyo BRT.

== Subsidiaries of Keisei Bus after restracture ==
=== Keisei Bus Tokyo ===
Keisei Bus Tokyo Inc.

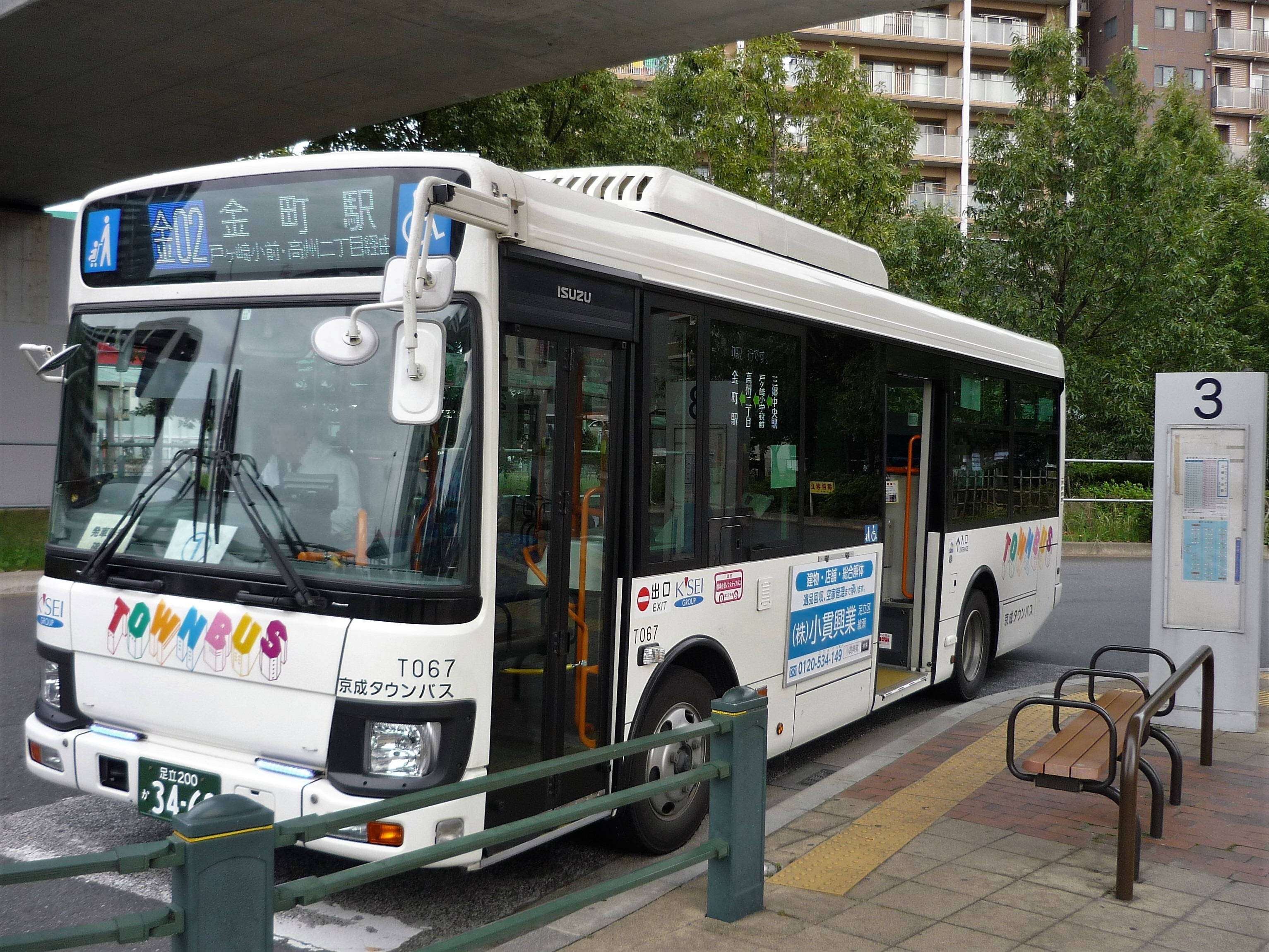
- Parent: Keisei Dentetsu Bus Holdings
- Founded: 12 May 2000
- Headquarters: 2-6-10 Okuto, Katsushika, Tokyo, Japan (東京都葛飾区奥戸2丁目6番10号)
- Service area: Tokyo
- Service type: Bus
- Routes
- Chief executive: 檜山雅紀
- Website: (in Japanese)

The Keisei Bus Tokyo Inc. (京成バス東京株式会社, Keisei Basu Toukyou Kabushiki-gaisha) is a bus company that renamed from the Keisei Town Bus.

==== Outline ====
This company was established on 12 May 2000 by splitting from Keisei Electric Railway, and started operating bus routes transferred from Keisei Bus on 16 February 2001.

In 2025, by the reorganization of the Keisei bus group, Keisei Town Bus became the Keisei Bus Tokyo.

==== Office ====
- Katsushika Office (Former name: Head Office)
- Okudo Office
- Kanamachi Office
- Edogaw Office

==== Routes ====
All bus routes are operated around Katsushika-ku, Tokyo; Edogawa-ku, Tokyo; and Taito-ku, Tokyo.

- Asakusa Kotobukicho・Horikiri Shobuen Station・Kameari Station
- Kameari Station・Kanamachi Station
- Kanamachi Station・Misato-chuo Station
- Kameari Station・Ayase Station
- Asakusa Kotobukicho・Shin-Koiwa Station
- Yotsugi Station・Shin-Koiwa Station
- Komatsugawa Police Office・Ichinoe Station
- Keisei Koiwa Station・Koiwa Station・Ichinoe Station
- Koiwa Station・Keisei Koiwa Station・Shiabamata Taishakuten・Kanamachi Station
- Koiwa Station・Ichikawa Station

=== Keisei Bus Chiba East ===
Keisei Bus Chiba East Co. Ltd.
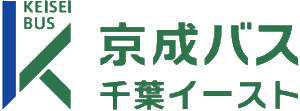

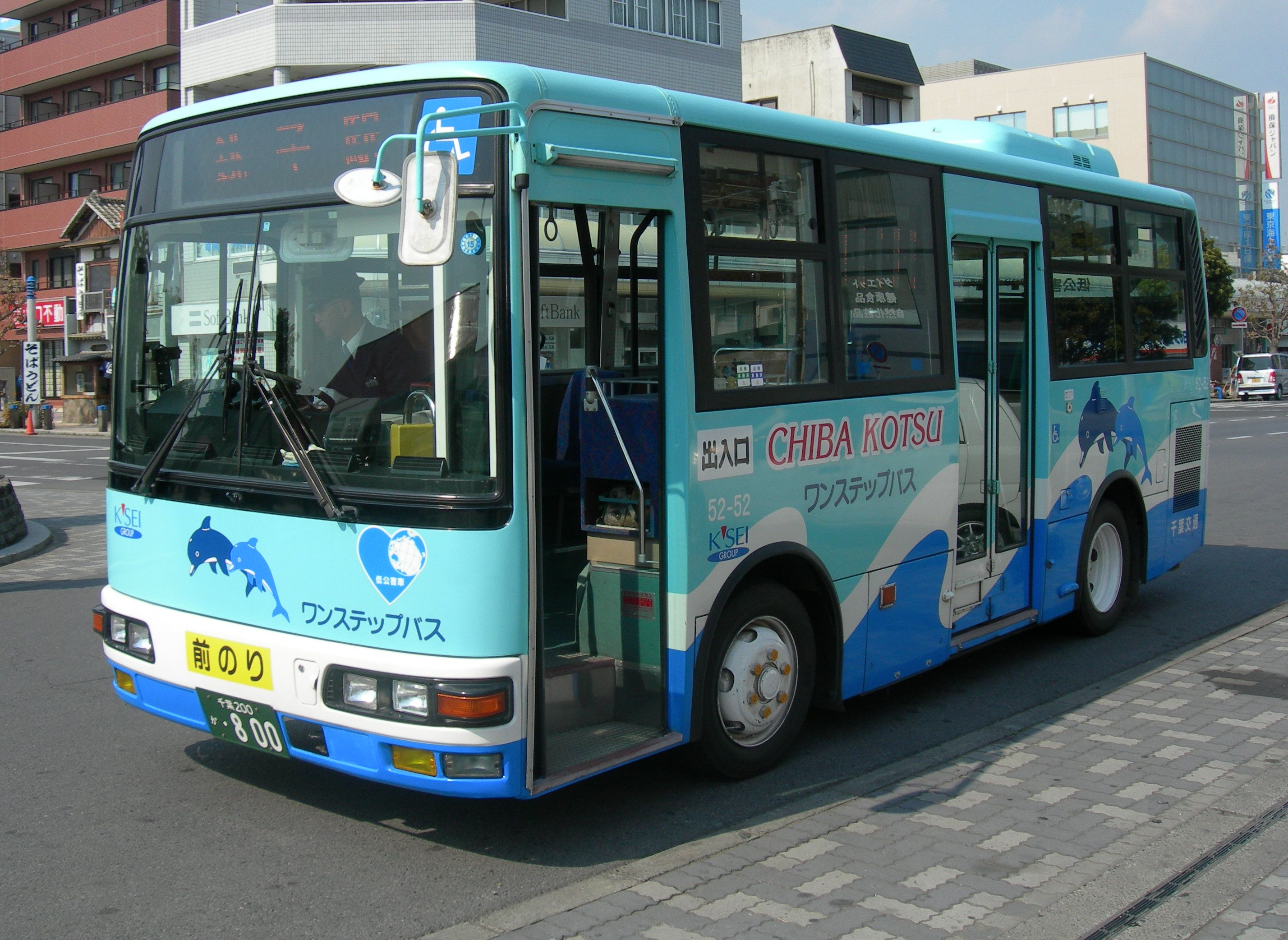
- Mitsubishi Fuso Aero Midi
- Parent: Keisei Dentetsu Bus Holdings
- Founded: 1 April 2025
- Headquarters: 750-1 Hanasakicho, Narita, Chiba, Japan (千葉県成田市花崎町750-1)
- Service area: Chiba
- Service type: Bus
- Chief executive: Takeshi Miyamoto
- Website: Keisei Bus (in Japanese)

The Keisei Bus Chiba East Co., Ltd. (京成バス千葉イースト株式会社, Keisei Bus Chiba East Kabushiki-gaisha) is a bus company that was born in the reorganization of the Keisei Bus Group in April 2025. It operates in the eastern part of Chiba Prefecture (Chiba City, Yotsukaido City, Sakura City, Narita City, Choshi City, etc.). The predecessor of this company is Chiba Kotsu, it established on 16 November 1906 as a bus department of the former Seiso Electric Railway. The tram lines of Seiso Electric Railway were an affiliated company of Keisei Electric Railway (Keisei Group).

Chiba Kotsu was the parent company of Choshi Electric Railway from 1960 until 1990.

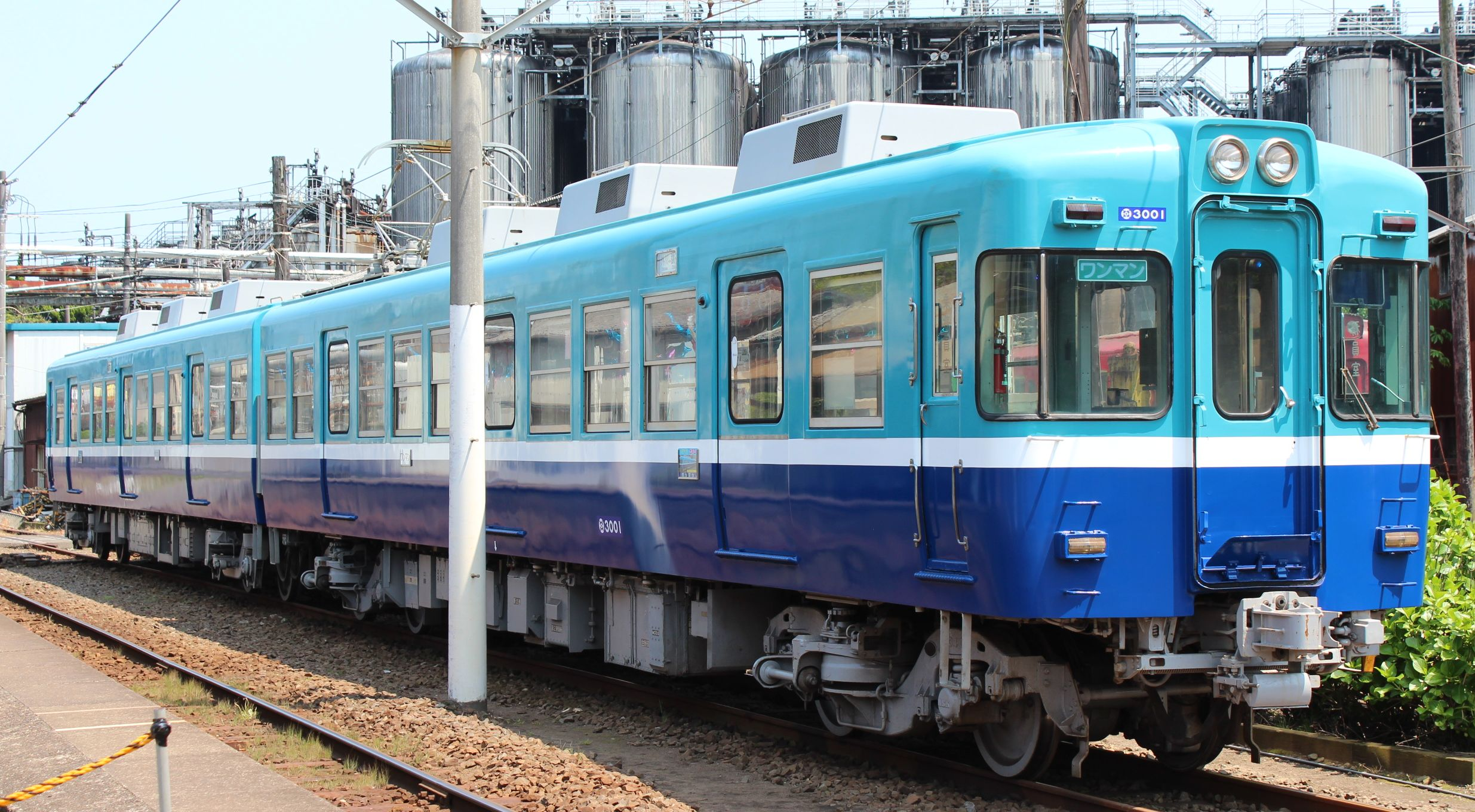
Former Keisei group company Choshi Electric Railway

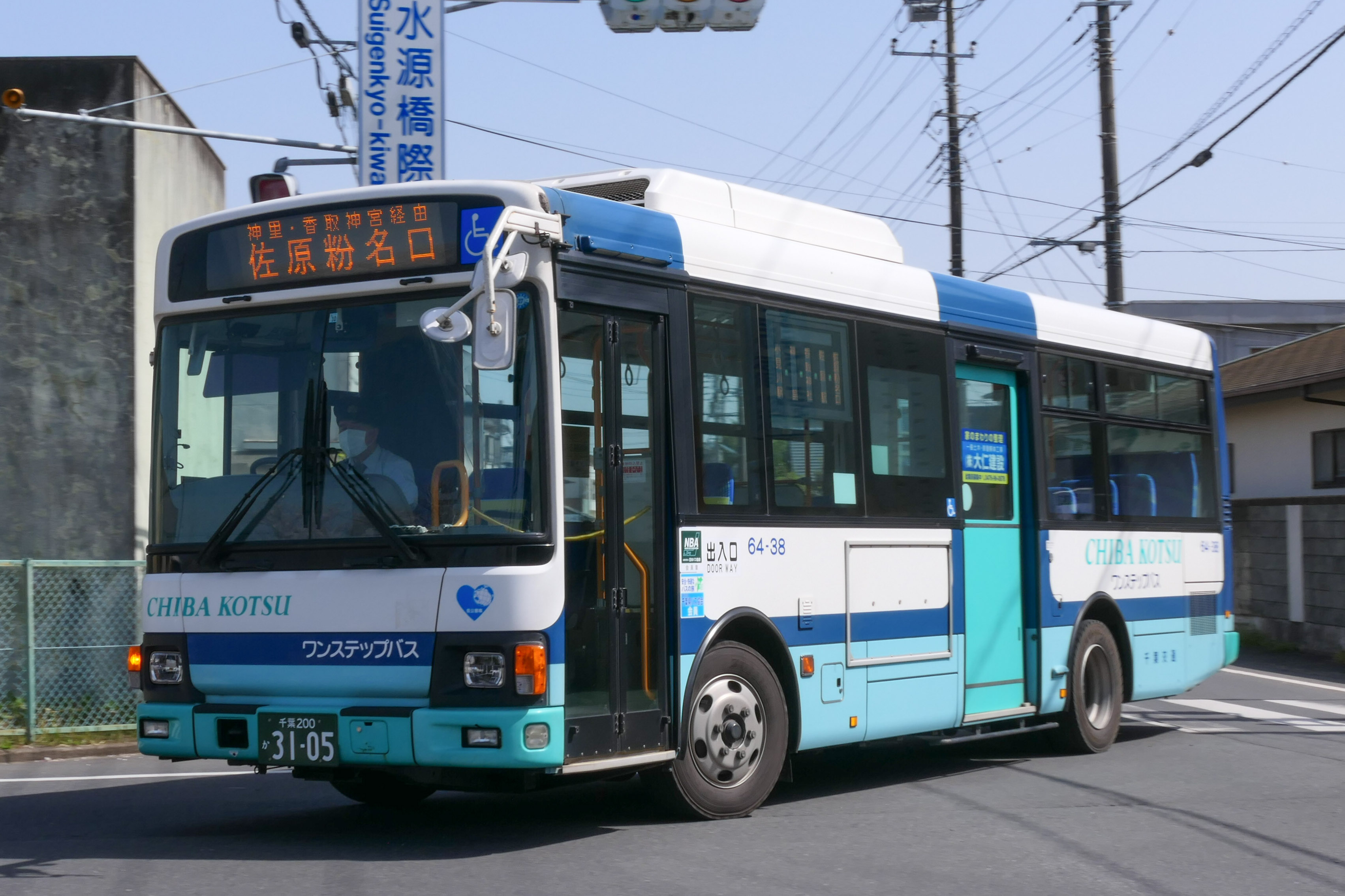
Chiba Kotsu color

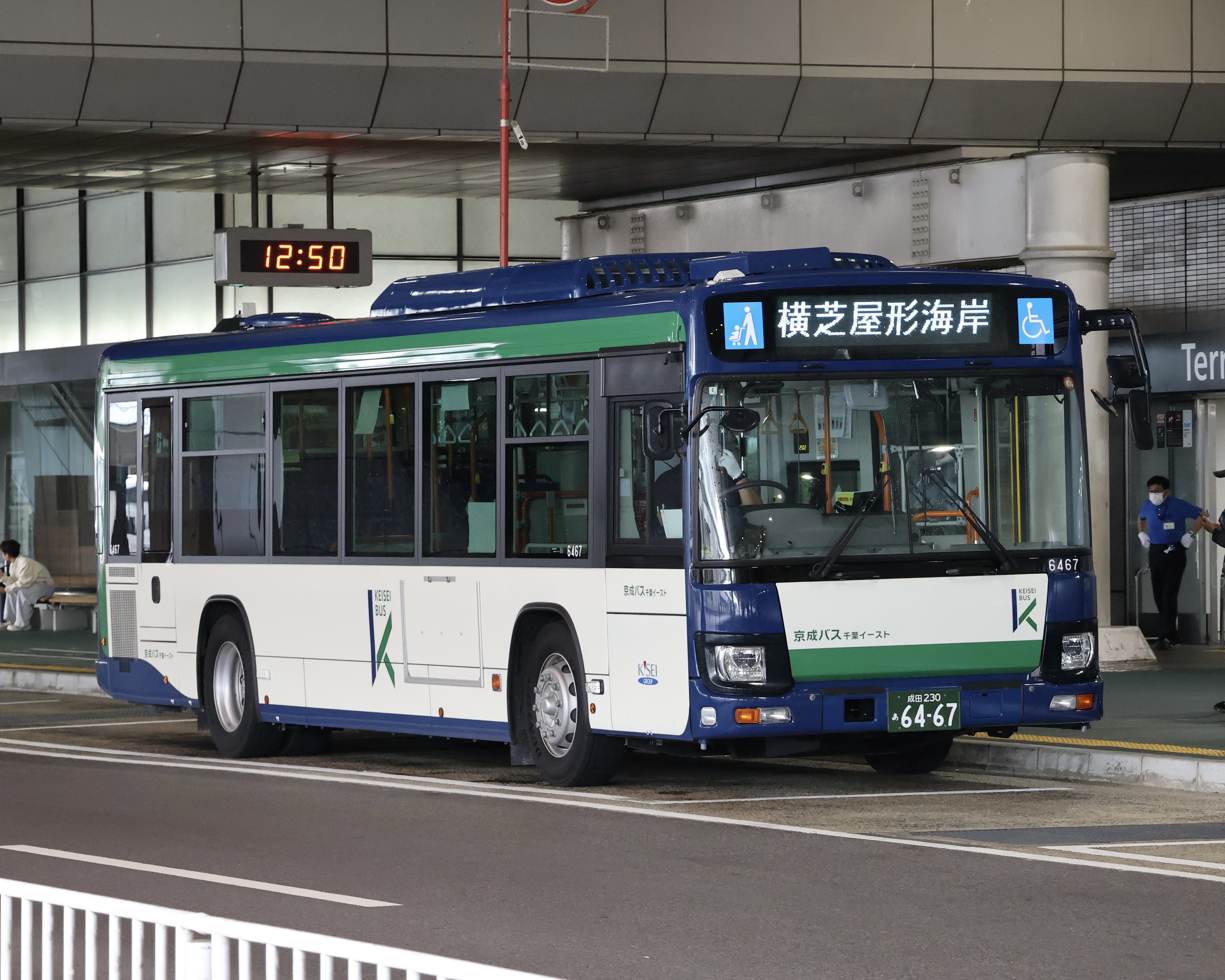
New color of Keisei Bus Chiba East

==== Office ====
- Narita Office
- Tako Office
- Choshi Office
- Chiba Higashi Office
- Chiba Minami Office
- Onodai Office
- Nakano Office
- Naruto Office
- Shinminato Office
- Yotsukaido Office
- Sakura Office
- Narita Airport Office

==== Bus routes ====
- Choshi Station・Asahi Station (Chiba)
- Keisei Narita Station・Narita Yukawa Station
- Keisei Narita Station・Sawara Station
- Keisei Narita Station・Sogo Reido
- Keisei Narita Station・Yachimata Station
- Keisei Narita Station・Yokaichiba Station
- Chiba Station・Naruto Station

==== Expressway bus ====
- Tokyo Station・Sawara Station・Choshi Station
- Namba Station・Choshi Station

=== Keisei Bus Chiba Central ===
Keisei Bus Chiba Central Inc.
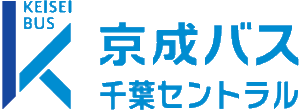

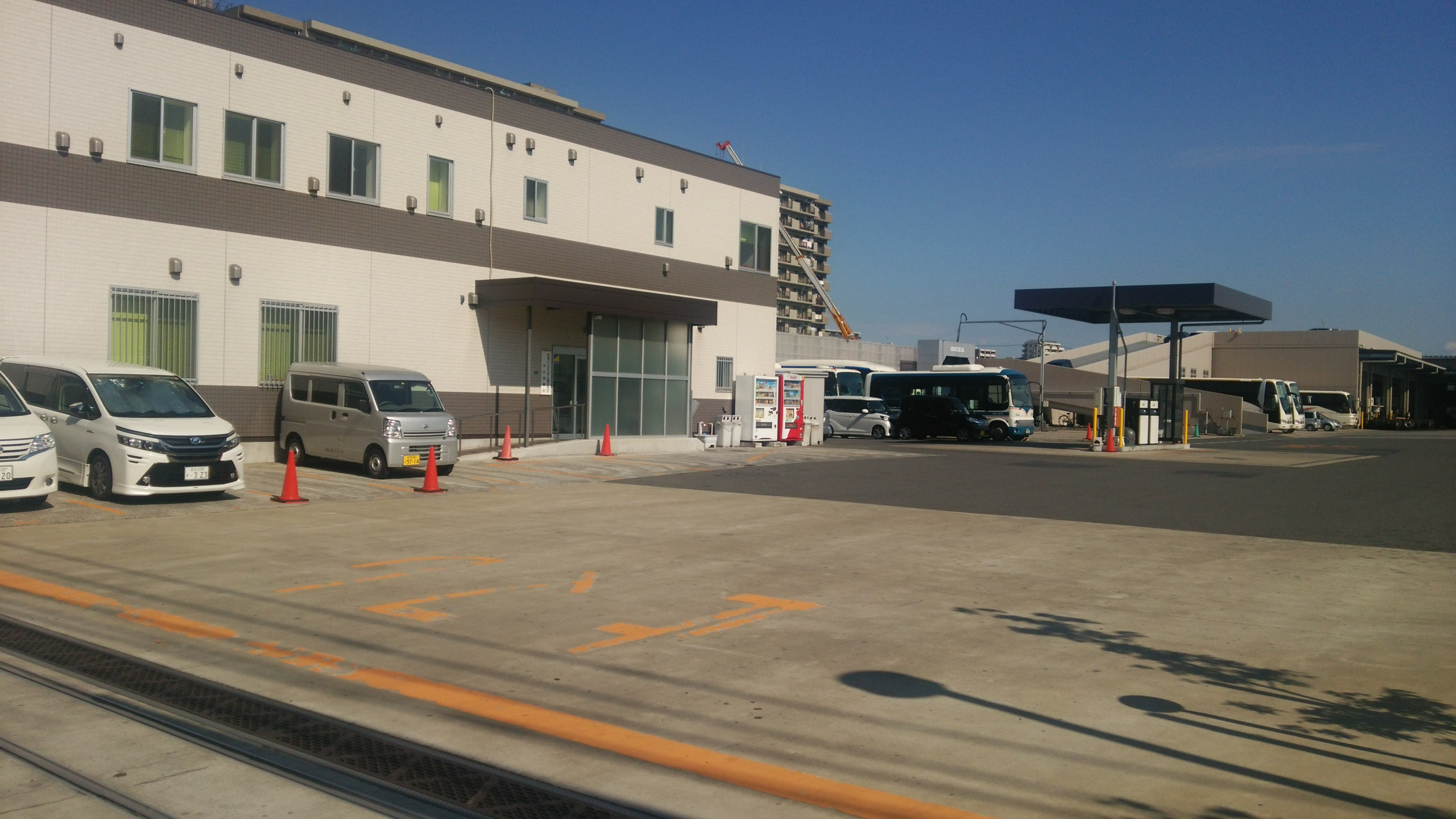
- Parent: Keisei Dentetsu Bus Holdings
- Founded: 10 October 1998(as Chiba Rainbow Bus)
- Headquarters: 1-10-10 Sakaemachi, Funabashi, Chiba, Japan (千葉県船橋市栄町1丁目10番10)
- Service area: Chiba
- Service type: Bus
- Routes
- Chief executive: 原一彰
- Website: (in Japanese)

==== Outline ====
In Appril 2025, Chiba Kaihin Kotsu, Keisei Bus, Keisei Bus System were merged into Chiba Rainbow Bus. At that time, Chiba Rainbow Bus renamed Keisei Bus Chiba Central.

==== Office ====
Office		Locate	Note
Headoffice		1-10-10, Sakaemachi, Funabashi	
Shin-Narashino Highwaybus Office		3-7-4, Akanehama, Narashino	
Shin-Toshin Office		2-7-3, Shibazono, Narashino, Chiba	
Narashino-nishi Office		4-16-20, Narashino, Funabashi	
Narashino-higashi Office		4-15-15, Narashino, Funabashi	
Takahama Office		2-3-1, Takahama, Mihama-ku, Chiba	
Naganuma Office	Kusano Garage	332-2, Naganumacho, Inage-ku, Chiba	
Naganuma Office	Hanamigawa Garage	2-1-76, Sakushidai, Hanamigawa-ku, Chiba	
Inzai Office	Funao Garage	1377, Funao, Inzai, Chiba	
Inzai Office	Shiroi Garage	Shishiba, Shiroi, Chiba	

=== Keisei Bus Chiba West ===
Keisei Bus Chiba West Inc.
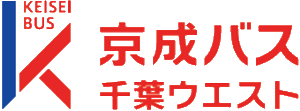

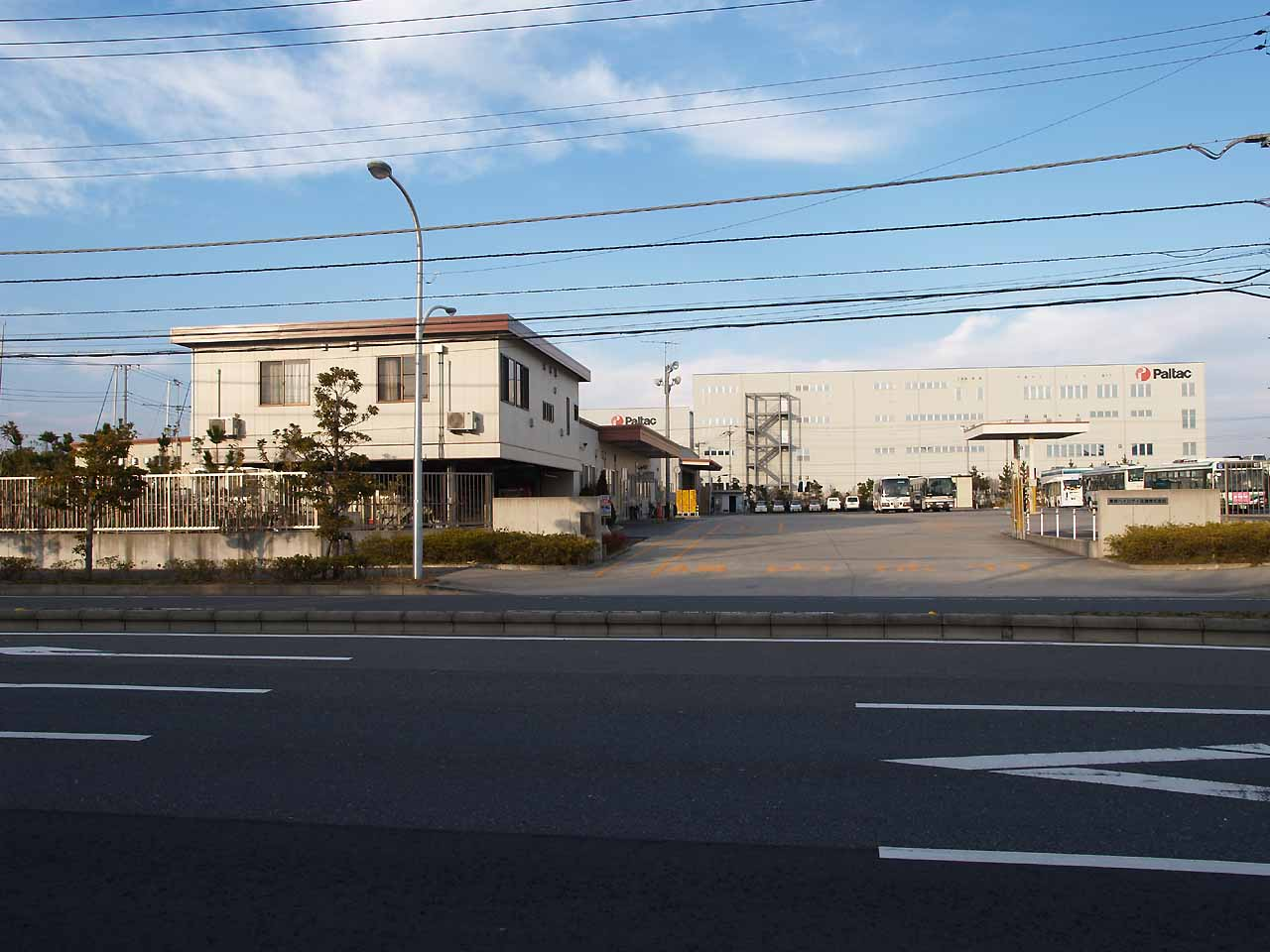
- Parent: Keisei Dentetsu Bus Holdings and Oriental Land Company
- Founded: 2 February 1998(as Keisei Transit Bus)
- Headquarters: 12-5, Chidori, Urayasu, Chiba, Japan (千葉県浦安市千鳥12番5号)
- Service area: Chiba
- Service type: Bus
- Routes
- Chief executive: 藤本剛弘
- Website: (in Japanese)

==== Outline ====
In Appril 2025, Keisei Transit Bus, Tokyo Bay City Bus, Keisei Bus, Matsudo Shin-Keisei Bus were merged into this company.

==== Office ====
Office		Locate	Note
Headoffice		12-5, Chidori, Urayasu	The former Tokyo Bay City Bus headquarters
Maihama Office		15-35, Chidori, Urayasu	The former Keisei Transit Bus Chidori Office
Shiohama Office		2-17-4, Shiohama, Ichikawa	The former Keisei Transit Bus headquarters
Ichikawa Office		4-271-2, Kashiwaicho, Ichikawa	The former Keisei Bus Ichikawa Office
Matsudo Office		101, Kogasaki, Matsudo	The former Keisei Bus Matsudo Office
Matsudo-higashi Office	Kamishiki Garage	96-36, Kamishiki, Matsudo	The former Matsudo Shin-Keisei Bus Matsudo Office
Matsudo-higashi Office	Koganebara Garage	6-3, Koganebara, Matsudo	The former Matsudo Shin-Keisei Bus Matsudo Office
Kamagaya Office		1-8-2, Kamagaya, Kamagaya, Chiba	The former Funabashi Shin-Keisei Bus Kamagaya Office

== Information ==
=== Tickets ===
==== IC Card Tokyo One-Day Pass ====
This pass (Note: Available on PASMO and Suica IC cards.) provides passengers unlimited use of all Keisei Bus Tokyo buses in Tokyo, including 金61 (Note: This connects Kanamachi Station with Yashio Station.) in Saitama, as well as Arakawa City and Sumida City community buses. It is not valid for expressway and midnight bus routes.

- Fare
  - 520 yen (adults)
  - 260 yen (child)

==== Keisei Bus Chiba East One Day Pass ====
This pass provides passengers unlimited use of all route buses from the Chiba Minami Office and Onodai Office of Keisei Bus Chiba East. It is only sold within the application.

- Fare
  - 850 yen (adults)
  - 430 yen (child)

== Group companies in the past ==
The following companies demerged from Keisei Electric Railway and Keisei Bus between 1990 and 2000.

Due to the reorganization in 2025, all of the following companies will not exist.

=== Chiba Flower Bus ===
Chiba Flower Bus Co., Ltd.
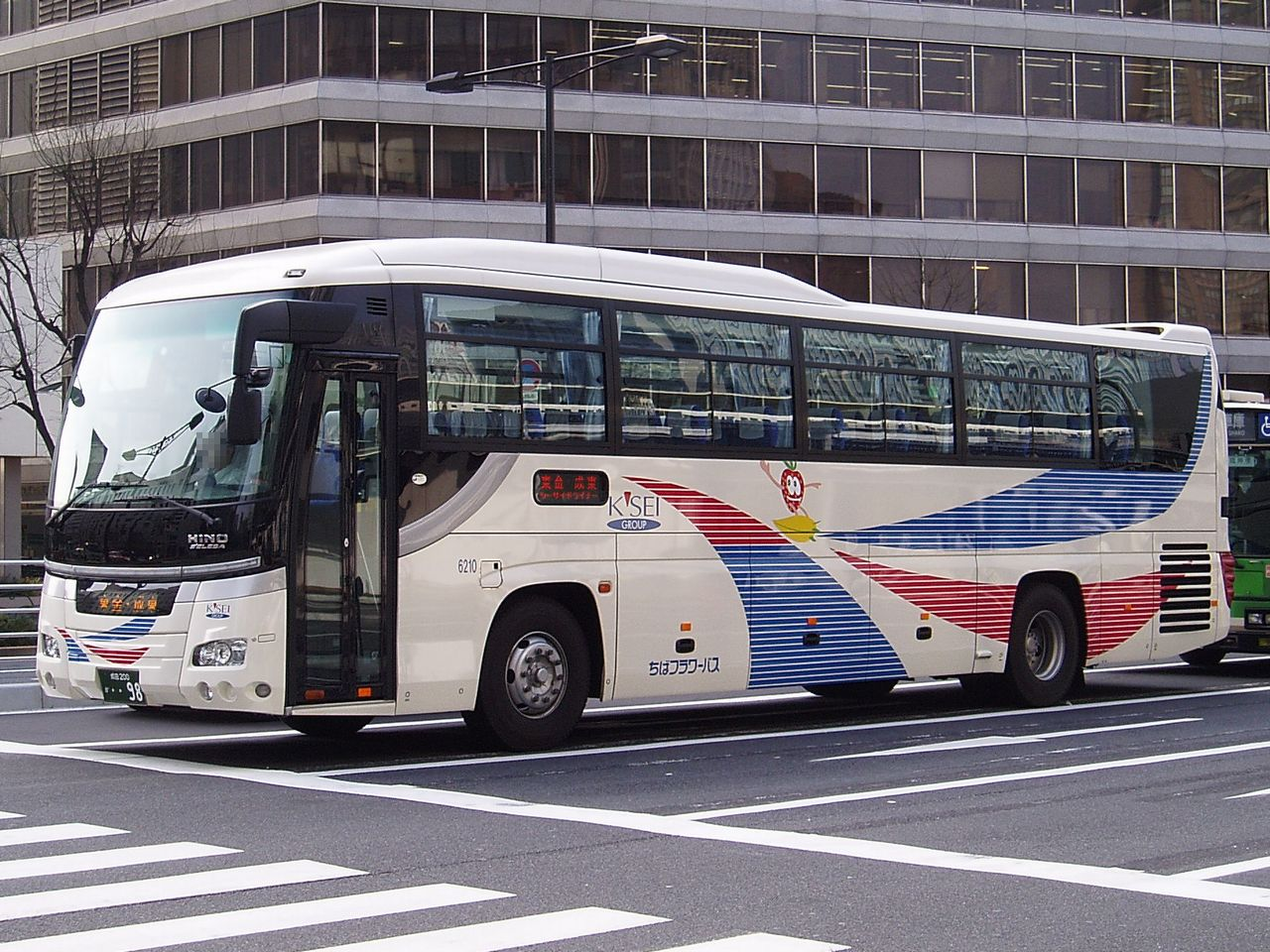
- Hino Selega bus featuring the Chiba Flower Bus branding on the side
- Parent: Keisei Bus, Keisei Electric Railway
- Founded: 2 October 1991 (renamed Reinetsu Service in 1994)
- Headquarters: 47 Tsube, Sanmu, Chiba, Japan (千葉県山武市津辺47)
- Service area: Chiba
- Service type: Bus
- Routes: Route map Expressway buses: Strawberry Liner; Seaside Liner; Flower Liner
- Fleet: 50
- Website: Chiba Flower Bus (in Japanese)

The Chiba Flower Bus Co., Ltd. (ちばフラワーバス株式会社, Chiba Fulawā Basu Kabushiki-gaisha) is a bus company that demerged from the Naruto Office.

==== Outline ====
Initially named the 'Reinetsu Service', the bus company was established on 2 October 1991. It was renamed 'Chiba Flower Bus' on 2 August 1994, and started operating many bus routes which were transferred from Keisei Electric Railway on 1 May 1995. (Note: This company is demerged from bus department of Keisei Electric Railway for the first time.) Over time, bus routes with low usage were discontinued or unified, and bus routes within Narutō were established around Narutō Station and Chiba Station by a community-based company.

In 2025, by the reorganization of the Keisei bus group, Chiba Flower Bus was merged and become the Keisei Bus Chiba East.

==== Office ====
- Narutō Office (Former name: Head Office) , located at the Narutō Garage, a 5-minute walk from Narutō Station.
- Nakano Office

==== Routes ====
- Bus route map
- Community Buses
  - Yachimata City Community Bus
  - Sanmu City Community Bus

The expressway buses run via Chiba-Tōgane Road.

Chiba Flower Bus – Expressway Buses
Name	Terminus	Via	Terminus	Note
Seaside Liner	Tokyo Station	Okayama Elementary School・Tōgane Station・Saibansho・Tama Chuo Koen・Narutō High School	Narutō Station Garage	It is not possible to get on and off at bus stops between Okayama Junior High School and Narutō Garage.
Seaside Liner	Tokyo Station	Okayama Elementary School・Tōgane Station・Saibansho・Togane Commercial High School	Narutō Station Garage	It is not possible to get on and off at bus stops between Okayama Junior High School and Narutō Garage.
Flower Liner	Chiba Station	Tōgane Station	Narutō Station Garage	
Flower Liner	Chiba Station	Togane Junior High School・Gumyo Station・Musada・Shirahata-Yotsukado	Narutō Station Garage	
Flower Liner	Chiba Station	Higashi-chiba Medical Center・Tōgane Station	Narutō Station Garage	
Strawberry Liner	AEON MALL Makuhari-Shintoshin	Kaihimmakuhari Station・Okayama Elementary School・Ojagaike・Daikata 1 chome・Sanazato・Oshibori・Minami-kamijuku・Togane Junior High School・Katagai Kendo Kosaten・Tama Newtown Iriguchi・Azuma Junior High School・Sanaoshi・Gumyo Station・Josai International University・Bypass Himejima・Heta・Azumacho	Narutō Station Garage	Only operates on holidays

=== Chiba Rainbow Bus ===
Chiba Rainbow Bus Co., Ltd.
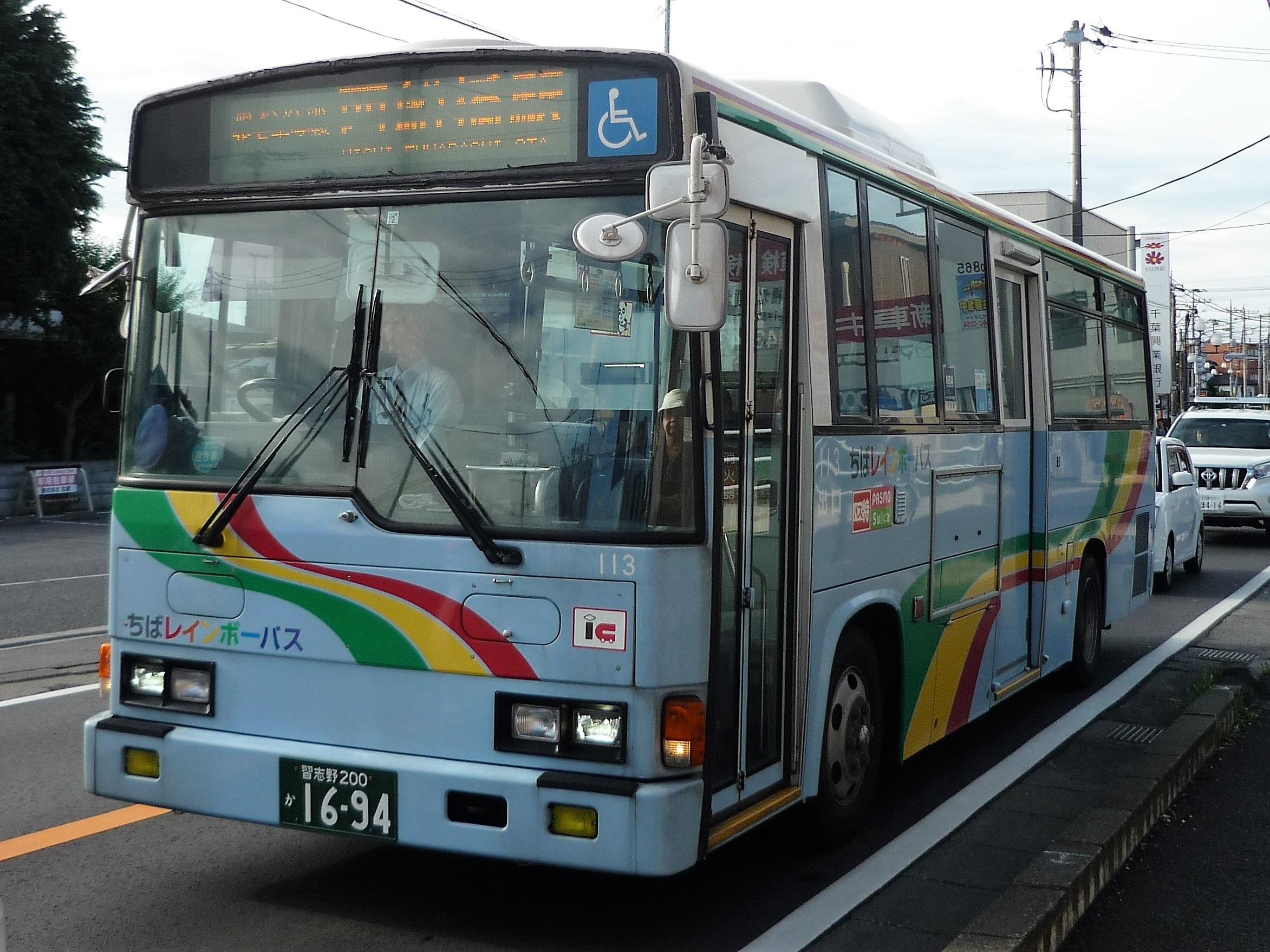
- Hino Rainbow bus with Chiba Rainbow Bus branding
- Parent: Keisei Bus, Keisei Electric Railway
- Founded: 1 June 1998
- Headquarters: 1337 Funao, Inzai, Chiba, Japan (千葉県印西市船尾1377番地)
- Service area: Chiba
- Service type: Bus
- Routes: Route map
- Fleet: 77
- Website: Chiba Rainbow Bus (in Japanese)

The Chiba Rainbow Bus Co., Ltd. (ちばレインボバス株式会社, Chiba Reinbo Basu Kabushiki-gaisha) is a bus company that demerged from the Funabashi Office (Funao Garage) and the Matsudo Office (Shiroi Garage).

==== Outline ====
This company was established on 1 June 1998. Many of its bus routes were transferred from Keisei Electric Railway.

In 2025, by the reorganization of the Keisei bus group, Chiba Rainbow Bus was merged and become the Keisei Bus Chiba Central Inzai Office.

==== Office ====
- Head Office (Funao Garage)
- Shiroi Office

==== Bus routes ====
Chiba Rainbow Bus – Bus Routes
Name	Terminus	Via	Terminus	Note
Kanzaki Line	Tsudanuma Station	Yachiyo-Midorigaoka Station・Funao Garage・Chiba New Town Chuo Station	Kioroshi Station	
Shiroi Line	Nishi-Funabashi Station	Hoten・Magomezawa Station・Kamagaya-Daibutsu Station・Shiroi Station	Shiroi Garage (Note: It is possible to transfer onto the Shimosa Airbase Line bound for Goko Station or Takayanagi Station, and onto the Nishi-Shiroi Line bound for Shin-Kamagaya Station.)	

==== Expressway buses ====
The company does not have any expressway bus routes.

==== Community buses ====
- Shiroi City Community Bus
- Kamagaya City Community Bus

=== Chiba City Bus ===
Chiba City Bus Co., Ltd.
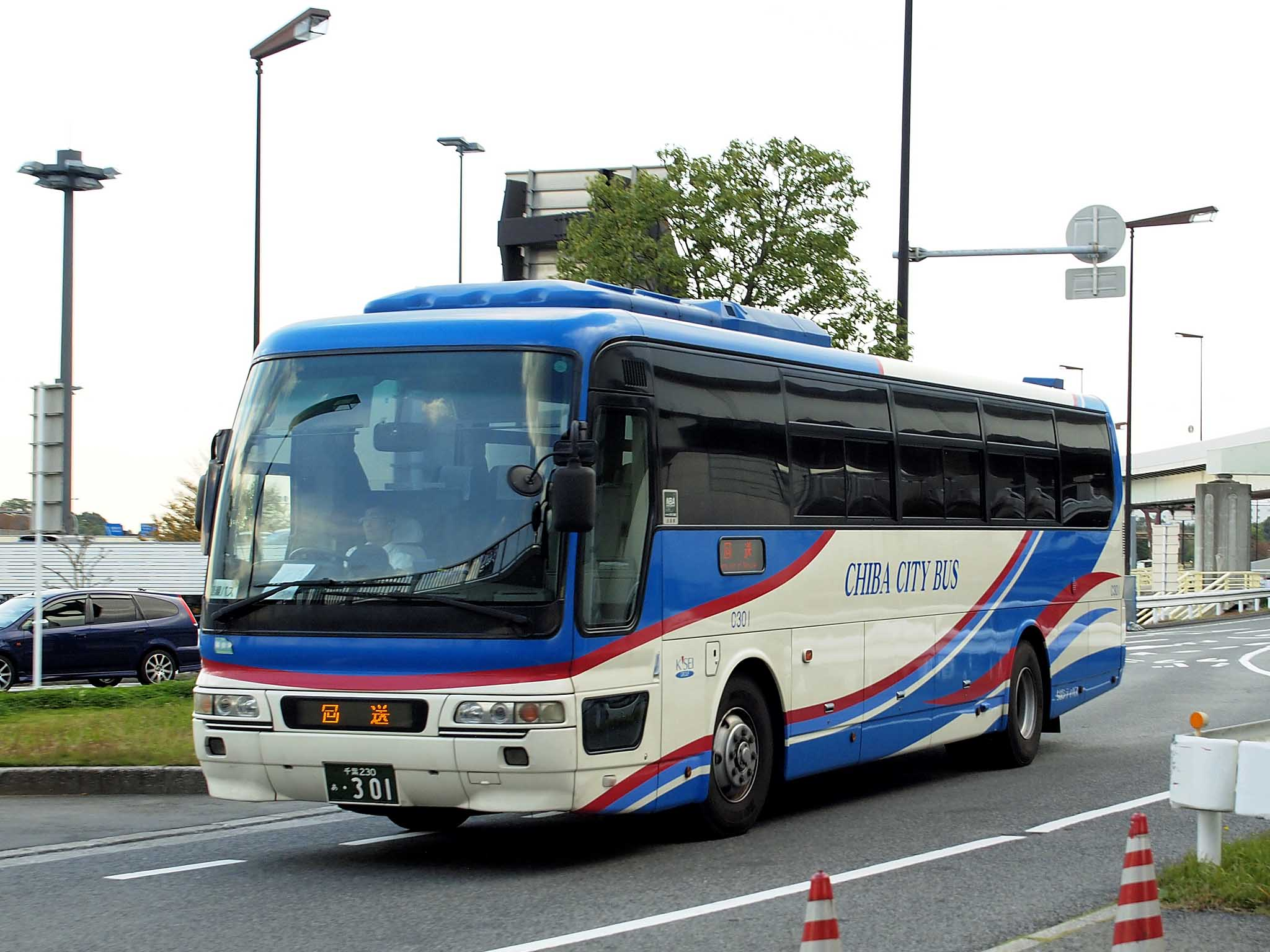
- Mitsubishi Fuso Aero Bus with the Chiba City Bus branding
- Parent: Keisei Bus, Keisei Electric Railway
- Founded: February 1999
- Headquarters: 32-12 Shinminato, Mihama, Chiba, Chiba, Japan (千葉県千葉市美浜区新港32-12)
- Service area: Chiba
- Service type: Bus
- Routes: Route map Expressway buses: Haneda Airport; Narita Airport; Tateyama Line
- Fleet: 54
- Website: Chiba City Bus (in Japanese)

The Chiba City Bus Co., Ltd. (ちばシティバス株式会社, Chiba Shiti Basu Kabushiki-gaisha) is a bus company that demerged from the Chiba Office (Shinjuku Garage).

==== Outline ====
This company was established in February 1999 and started to operate on 16 January 2000 with two initial bus routes: the Pride City line, and the Saiwaicho Danchi line. These have now expanded to 11 routes in Chiba, especially around Chiba Station, as well as airport bus routes.

In 2025, by the reorganization of the Keisei bus group, Chiba City Bus was merged and become the Keisei Bus Chiba East Shinminato Office.

==== Office ====
- Head Office (Shinminato Garage)

It is located a 25-minute walk from Nishi-Nobuto Station and Midori-dai Station.

==== Routes ====
Local bus routes

Chiba City Bus – Expressway Buses
Name	Terminus	Via	Terminus	Note
Nanso Satomi	Chibaminato Station	Chiba Station・Tateyama Station (Chiba)	Awa-Shirahama Bus Terminal	Operated with Nitto Kotsu
Narita Airport Line	Inagekaigan Station	Kemigawa Station・Kaihimmakuhari Station	Narita Airport	Operated with Narita Airport Transport
Haneda Airport Line	Chiba-Chūō Station	Chiba Station・Kaihimmakuhari Station	Haneda Airport	Operated with Keihin Kyuko Bus and Airport Transport Service

=== Chiba Green Bus ===
Chiba Green Bus Co., Ltd.
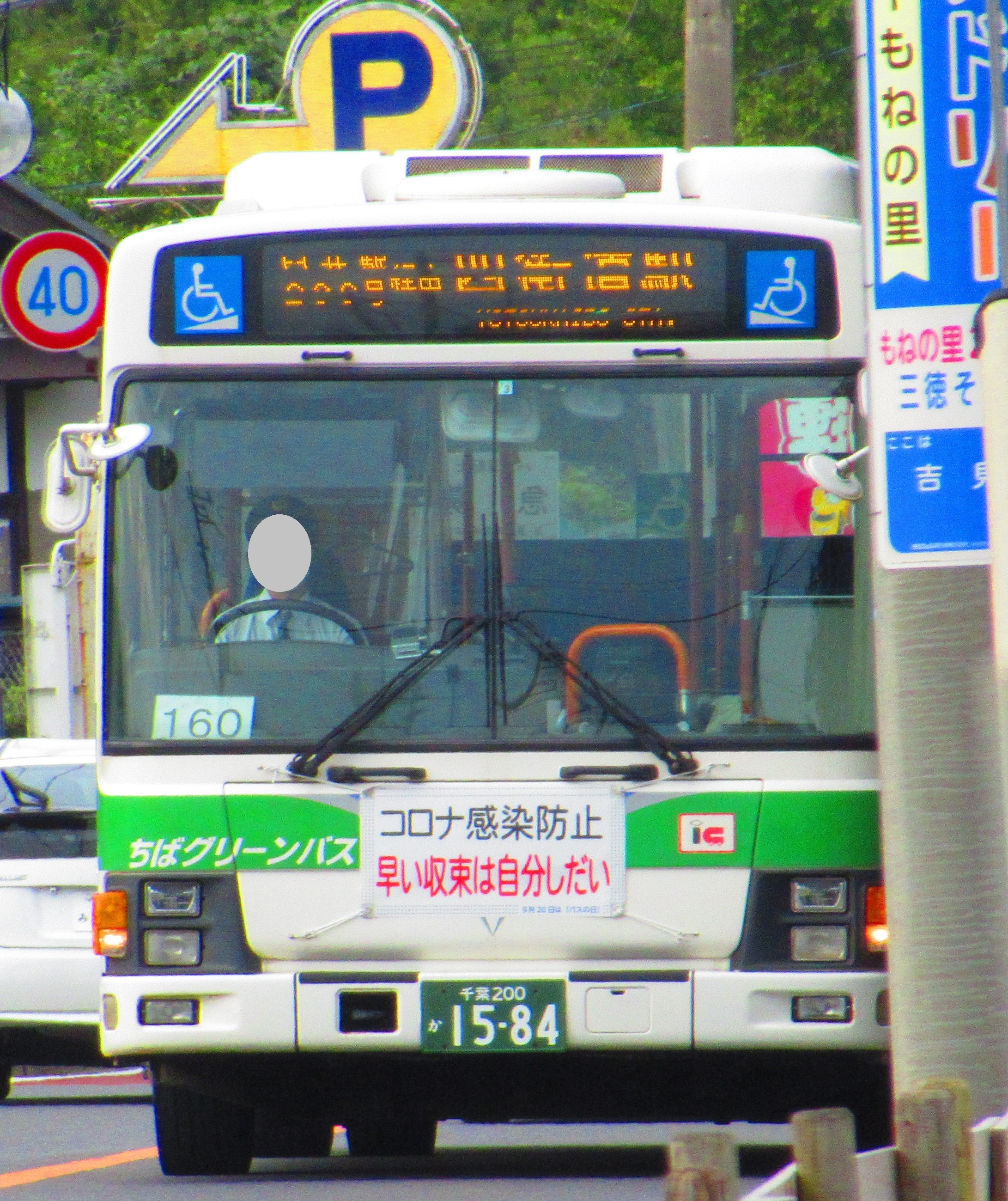
- Isuzu Erga (used on many routes）
- Parent: Keisei Bus, Keisei Electric Railway
- Founded: 9 February 2000
- Headquarters: 1474-１ Kakurai, Sakura, Chiba, Japan
- Service area: Chiba
- Service type: Bus
- Routes: Route map
- Chief executive: 勝田 佳男
- Website: Chiba Green Bus (in Japanese)

The Chiba Green Bus Co., Ltd. (ちばグリーンバス株式会社, Chiba Gurīn Basu Kabushiki-gaisha) is a bus company that demerged from the Sakura Office.

==== Outline ====
This company was established on 9 February 2000, and started operating bus routes transferred from Keisei Electric Railway on 16 July 2000. Bus routes with low earning rate were discontinued or unified, while specialized bus routes in the city of Sakura were established around Sakura Station by a community-based company.

Since 2010, Chiba Green Bus has operated the MyTown Direct bus, an expressway and midnight bus for commuters and from/to Tokyo.

In 2025, by the reorganization of the Keisei bus group, Chiba Green Bus was merged and become the Keisei Bus Chiba East Sakura Office.

==== Office ====
- Sakura Office, located near Keisei Sakura Station; nearby is the Tamachi Garage (Sakura Office)
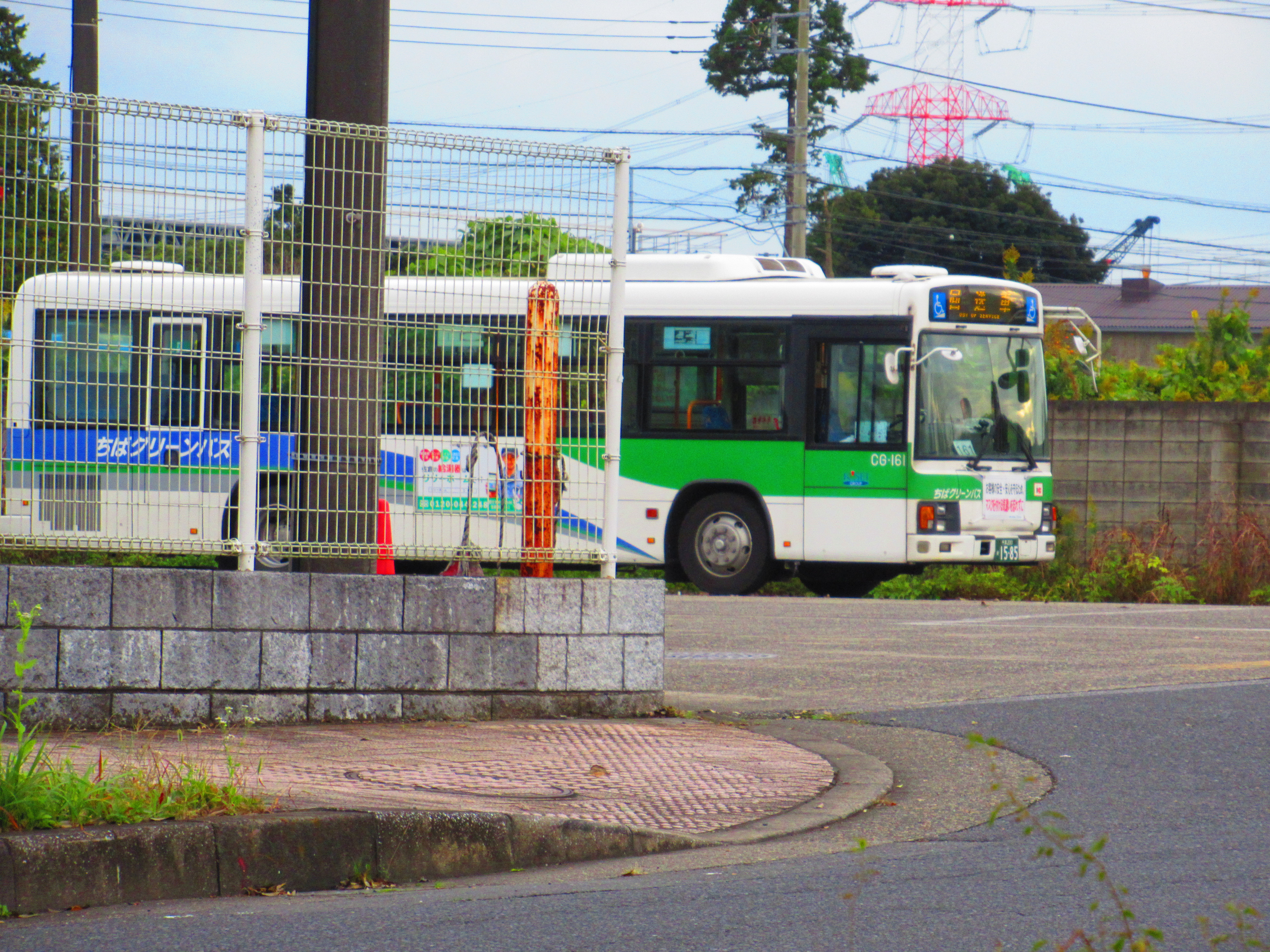
A Chiba Green Bus stops at Someino Turnaround, in a residential area near Keisei Usui Station

==== Bus routes ====
- Route map
- Community bus route map (routes consigned from the city of Sakura)

Chiba Green Bus – Expressway buses
Name	Terminus	Via	Terminus	Note
MyTown Direct	Yūkarigaoka	Yūkarigaoka Station・Keisei Usui Station・Chiyoda Danchi・Tokyo Station・Kokusai-Tenjijō Station	Shinonome Garage	
MyTown Direct	National Museum of Japanese History	Kawamura Memorial DIC Museum of Art・Tokyo Station	Shinonome Garage	

Chiba Green Bus – Midnight buses
No.	Terminus	Via	Terminus	Note
1	Shimbashi Station	Yūrakuchō Station★・Funabashi Station★・Tsudanuma Station★・Yachiyodai Station★・Katsutadai Station★・Shizu Station・Yūkarigaoka Station・Keisei Usui Station★・Sakura Station★・Shisui Station★・Kozunomori Station★・Narita Station★	Narita Airport	Runs only on Fridays, except holidays. Passengers can board from bus stops marked "★".
2	Shimbashi Station	Yūrakuchō Station★・Funabashi Station★・Tsudanuma Station★・Yachiyodai Station★・Keisei Owada Station・Katsutadai Station★・Shizu Station・Yūkarigaoka Station・Keisei Usui Station★	Keisei Sakura Station	Runs only on weekdays. Passengers can board from bus stops marked "★".

=== Keisei Bus System ===
Keisei Bus System Co., Ltd.
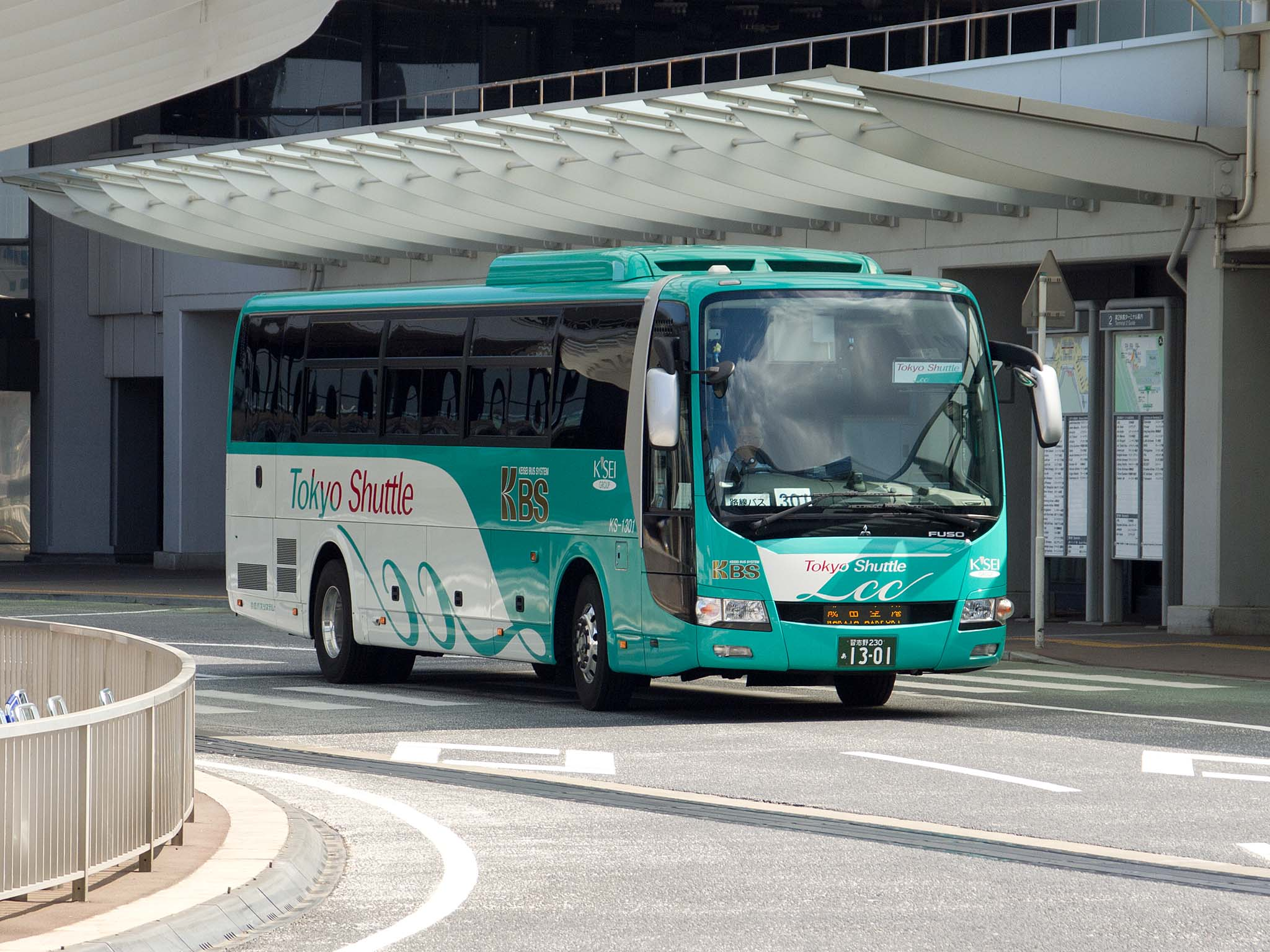
- Mitsubishi Fuso Aero Ace (used for many airport buses)
- Parent: Keisei Bus, Keisei Electric Railway
- Founded: 22 November 2005
- Headquarters: 1-10-10 Sakaemachi, Funabashi, Chiba, Japan (千葉県船橋市栄町1丁目10番10号)
- Service area: Chiba
- Service type: Bus
- Routes: Route map Expressway route map
- Fleet: 75
- Chief executive: Takashi Miyamoto
- Website: Keisei Bus System (in Japanese); Airport Bus TYO-NRT

The Keisei Bus System Co., Ltd. (京成バスシステム株式会社, Keisei Basu Shisutemu Kabushiki-gaisha) is a bus company that demerged from the Funabashi Office.

==== Outline ====
This company was established on 22 November 2005 to manage charted buses and courtesy of companies in Funabashi, and started operating many bus routes transferred from Keisei Bus on 1 December 2007. In 2012, the Kashiwai Line, Shinai Line, and Higashi–Funabashi Line were transferred to this company when the Keisei Bus Hanawa Garage closed.

In 2025, by the reorganization of the Keisei bus group, Keisei Bus System was merged and become the Keisei Bus Chiba Central.

==== Office ====
- Funabashi Office (Former name: Head Office)

==== Routes ====
Keisei Bus System – Expressway Buses
Name	Terminus	Via	Terminus	Note
Airport Bus TYO-NRT	Tokyo Station	Non-stop	Narita Airport	See below for notes on seat reservations.
Airport Bus TYO-NRT	Kajibashi Parking	Non-stop	Narita Airport	See below for notes on seat reservations.
Airport Bus TYO-NRT	Ginza Station	Non-stop	Narita Airport	See below for notes on seat reservations.
Airport Bus TYO-NRT	Shinonome Garage	Non-stop	Narita Airport	See below for notes on seat reservations.

Airport Bus TYO-NRT seat reservations

Seat reservations are not enabled on TYO-NRT services (excluding some services departing from Kajibashi Parking). When departing from Kajibashi Parking, board the buses 20 minutes prior to departure. Some services departing from Ginza Station do not stop at Tokyo Station.

Seat reservations are required on buses departing from Narita Airport. Reservations can be made at the tickets counter of Narita Airport. However, for early morning and the late evening buses, fares are paid with cash or IC Card when boarding the bus.

== See also ==
- Keisei Electric Railway
- Kanto Railway
- Tokyo BRT
