= Katsutadai Station =

Railway station in Yachiyo, Chiba Prefecture, Japan

KS31 Katsutadai Station 勝田台駅
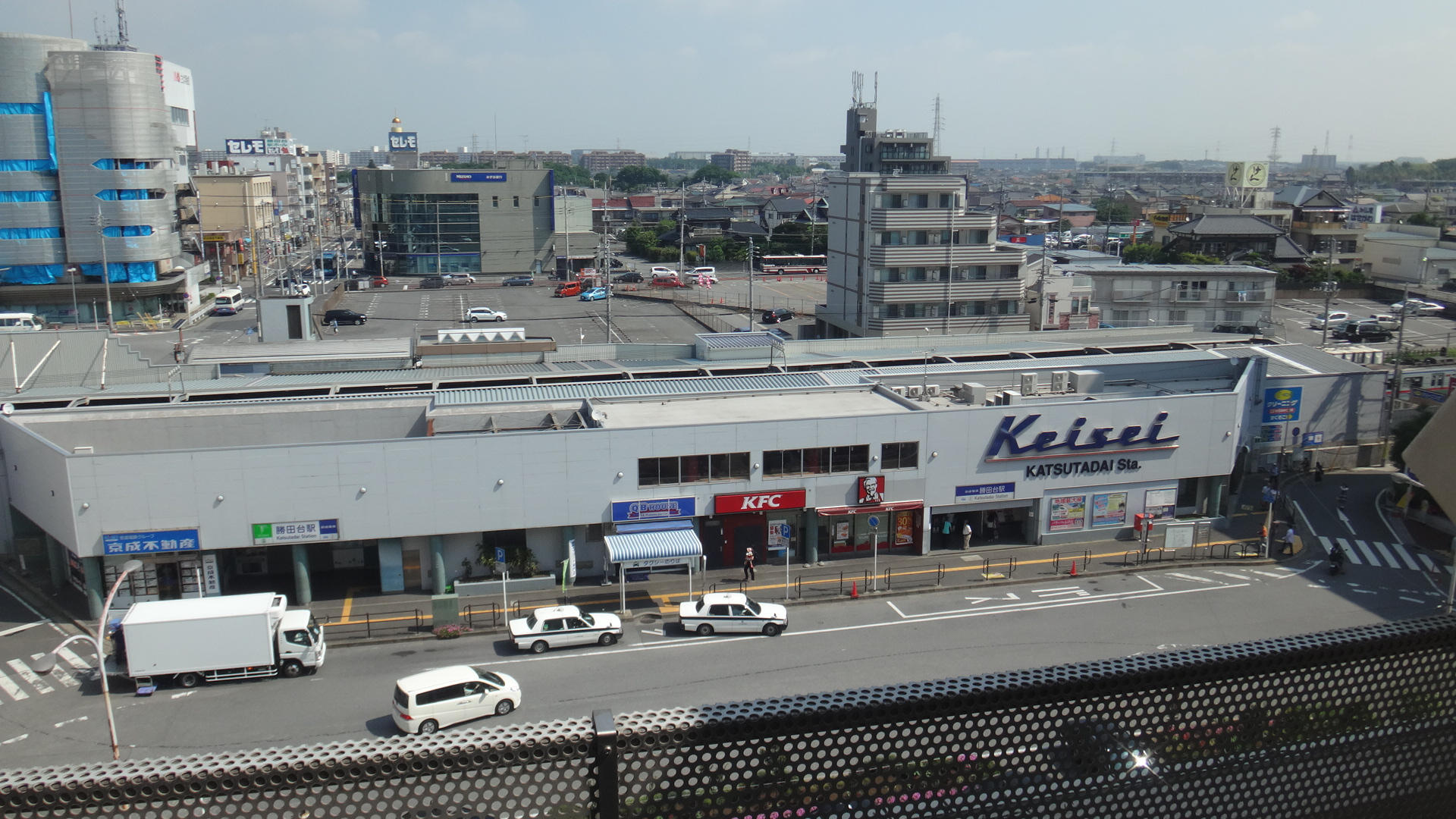
- Katsutadai Station entrance and forecourt, May 2015

General information
- Location: 1-8-1 Katsutadai, Yachiyo-shi, Chiba-ken 276-0023; Japan
- Coordinates: 35.715350°N 140.126324°E
- Operator: Keisei Electric Railway
- Line: Keisei Main Line
- Platforms: 2 side platforms
- Connections: TR09 Tōyō-Katsutadai Station

Other information
- Station code: KS31
- Website: Official website

History
- Opened: May 1, 1968

Passengers
- FY2019: 52,882 daily

Services
Preceding station	Keisei	Following station
Yachiyodai KS29 towards Keisei Ueno	Main Line Rapid Limited Express Limited Express	Keisei Sakura KS35 towards Narita Airport Terminal 1
Yachiyodai KS29 towards Keisei Ueno	Main Line Commuter Express	Shizu KS32 towards Narita Airport Terminal 1
Keisei Ōwada KS30 towards Keisei Ueno	Main Line Rapid Local	Shizu KS32 towards Narita Airport Terminal 1
Location
- Location within Chiba Prefecture Location within Japan

Katsutadai Station (勝田台駅, Katsutadai-eki) is a passenger railway station in the city of Yachiyo, Chiba, Japan, operated by the private railway operator Keisei Electric Railway.

== Lines ==
Katsutadai Station is served by the Keisei Main Line, and is 40.3 km from the Tokyo terminus at Keisei-Ueno Station. The station is connected to Tōyō-Katsutadai Station on the Tōyō Rapid Railway.

== Station layout ==
The station has two opposed side platforms connected by underpasses to the station building underneath.

=== Platforms ===
1	Keisei Main Line	for Keisei Funabashi, Aoto, Nippori, Keisei Ueno, and Oshiage
2	Keisei Main Line	for Keisei Narita, and Narita Airport (Terminal 2·3 and Terminal 1)

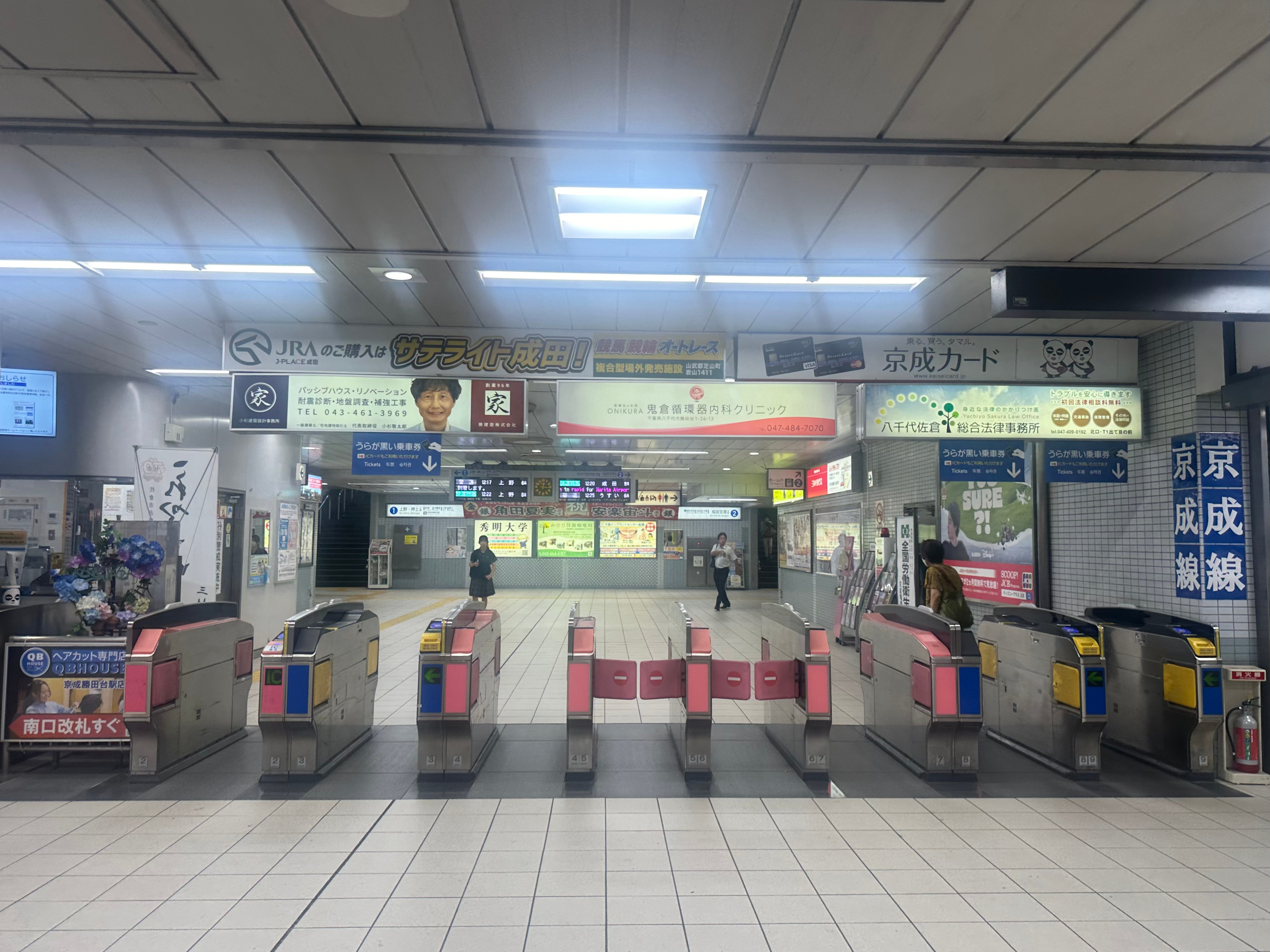
The ticket barriers, September 2024

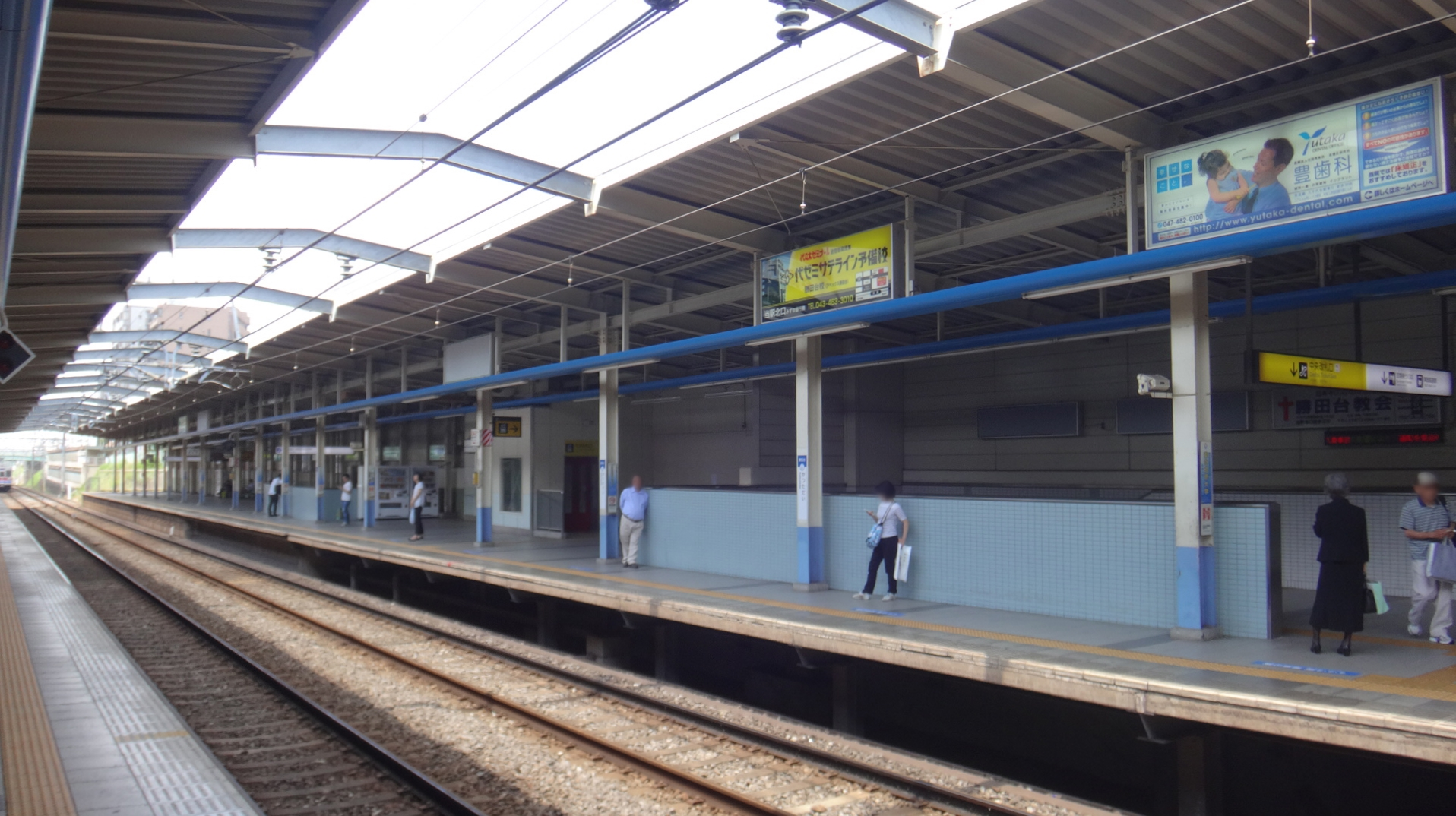
The platforms, looking west, May 2015

== History ==
Katsutadai Station opened on 1 May 1968. An underground passage was built to Tōyō-Katsutadai Station in 1997.

Station numbering was introduced to all Keisei Line stations on 17 July 2010. Keisei-Ōwada Station was assigned station number KS31.

== Passenger statistics ==
In fiscal 2019, the station was used by an average of 52,882 passengers daily.

== Buses ==
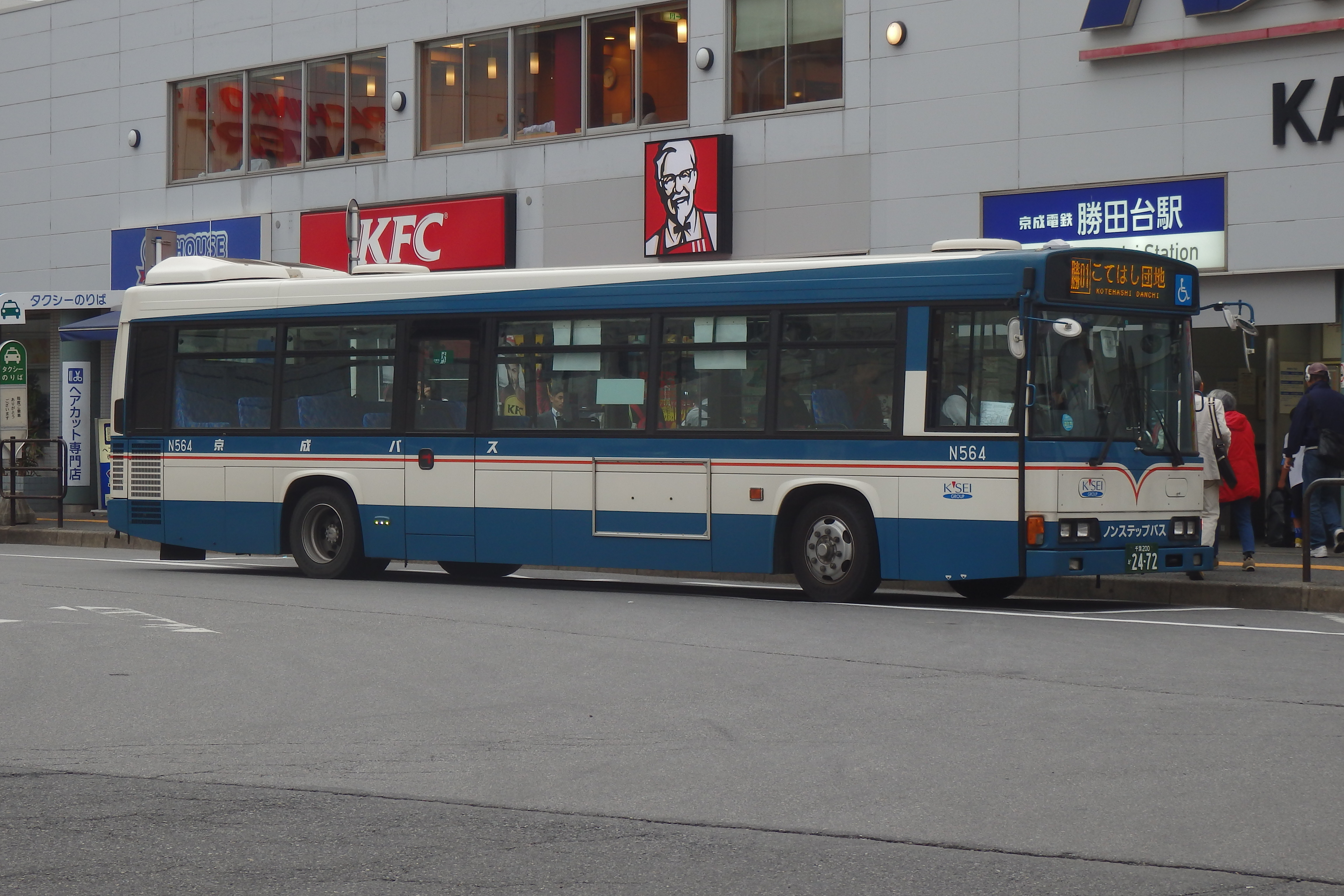
Keisei Bus Hino Rainbow（20 May 2014）

The bus routes are operated by Keisei Bus、Chiba Nairiku Bus、Tōyō Bus (Chiba) and most bus routes are bound for apartment complex.

Northern Exit

Bus stop	No	Via	Destination	Company	Note
1	Miyanodai Line[71] (circular-route)	Miyanodai	Katsutadai Station	Tōyō Bus (Chiba)	
1	Miyanodai Line[72]		Nishi-Yatsu Park	Tōyō Bus (Chiba)	Runs only during night
1	Midnight Express Bus	Keisei Usui Station・Sakura Station (Chiba)・Shisui Station・Kōzunomori Station・Narita Station	Narita Airport	Chiba Green Bus	
2	Iwato Line[23]	Kamitakano Kōgyō Danchi	Murakami Barn	Tōyō Bus	Runs only in the morning
2	Iwato Line[64]	Kamitakano Kōgyō Danchi・Yachiyo Golf Club mae	Moegino Barn (Tokyo Seitoku University)	Tōyō Bus	
2	Iwato Line[66]	Kamitakano Kōgyō Danchi・Aso Elementary School mae・Moegino Barn	Asō-bashi	Tōyō Bus	Runs only 4 services on weekdays.
3	Murakami Danchi Line[21]	Murakami Danchi Iriguchi	Murakami Danchi the first building (Murakami Danchi Daiichi)	Tōyō Bus	Midnight bus also runs on weekdays.

Southern Exit

Bus stop	No	Via	Destination	Company	Note
1	Kotehashi Danchi Line[勝01]	Shimoyokoto・Kotehashi Danchi Iriguchi	Kotehashi Danchi	Keisei Bus	Midnight bus also runs on weekdays.
1	Enokido Line[勝22]	Shimoyokoto・Kotehashi Danchi Iriguchi・Naganuma	Kusano Barn	Keisei Bus	Runs on 2 services on 1day
1	Yokodo Line[勝22]	Shimoyokoto・Kotehashi Danchi Iriguchi・Naganuma・Kusano Barn	Sports Center Station (Chiba)	Chiba Nairiku Bus	
2	Yonemoto Danchi Line[11]	Shimoichiba・Chiba Eiwa Highschool・Yachiyo Shōin Highschool	Yonemoto Danchi	Tōyō Bus	
3	[勝11] (circular-route)	Katsutadai Danchi	Katsutadai Station	Chiba Nairiku Bus	
Lawson mae	Miharuno Line[K31]	Nishi-Shizu Elementary School	Miharuno-Minami・Unaya Ryūtsū Danchi	Chiba Nairiku Bus	
Lawson mae	Shikatsu Line[Y40]	Nishi-Shizu Elementary School・Dainichi Chūō・Kotehashi Dai	Yotsukaido Station	Chiba Nairiku Bus	
Lawson mae	Miharuno・Shikatsu Line[K32深夜]	Unaya Ryūtsū Danchi	Yotsukaido Station	Chiba Nairiku Bus	Runs only for the direction of Yotsukaido Station on weekdays night.

== Surrounding area ==
- Tōyō-Katsutadai Station (Tōyō Rapid Railway Line)
- Yachiyo City Office
- Chiba Prefectural Yachiyo High School
- National Route 16
- National Route 296

== See also ==
- List of railway stations in Japan
