= Keisei Inage Station =

Railway station in Chiba, Japan

Coordinates: 35.6376°N 140.0857°E

KS55 Keisei Inage Station 京成稲毛駅
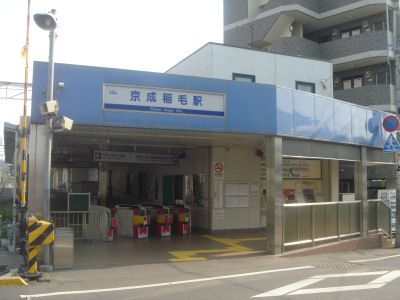
- Keisei Inage Station

General information
- Location: 3-1-17 Inage, Inage, Chiba, Chiba （千葉県千葉市稲毛区稲毛3丁目1番17号） Japan
- Operator: Keisei Electric Railway
- Line: Keisei Chiba Line

Other information
- Station code: KS55

History
- Opened: 1921
- Former names: Inage (until 1931)

Passengers
- 2009: 6,247 daily

Services
Preceding station	Keisei	Following station
Kemigawa KS54 towards Keisei Tsudanuma	Chiba Line	Midoridai KS56 towards Chiba-Chūō
Location

Keisei Inage Station (京成稲毛駅, Keisei Inage-eki) is a railway station in Inage-ku, Chiba, Japan, operated by the Keisei Electric Railway.

== Lines ==
Keisei Inage Station is served by the Keisei Chiba Line. It is located 8.1 km from the terminus of the line at Keisei-Tsudanuma Station.

== Station layout ==
Keisei Inage Station has two opposed side platforms connected by a level crossing.

=== Platforms ===
1	Keisei Chiba Line	for Keisei Tsudanuma, Aoto, and Keisei Ueno; Keisei Matsudo Line for Matsudo
2	Keisei Chiba Line	for Keisei Chiba and Chiharadai

== History ==
Keisei Inage Station opened on 17 July 17, 1921 as Inage Station (稲毛駅, Inage-eki). On 18 October 1931, it was renamed Keisei Inage Station.

Station numbering was introduced to all Keisei Line stations on 17 July 2010; Keisei Inage Station was assigned station number KS55.
