= Keisei Ōwada Station =

Railway station in Yachiyo, Chiba Prefecture, Japan

KS30 Keisei-Ōwada Station 京成大和田駅
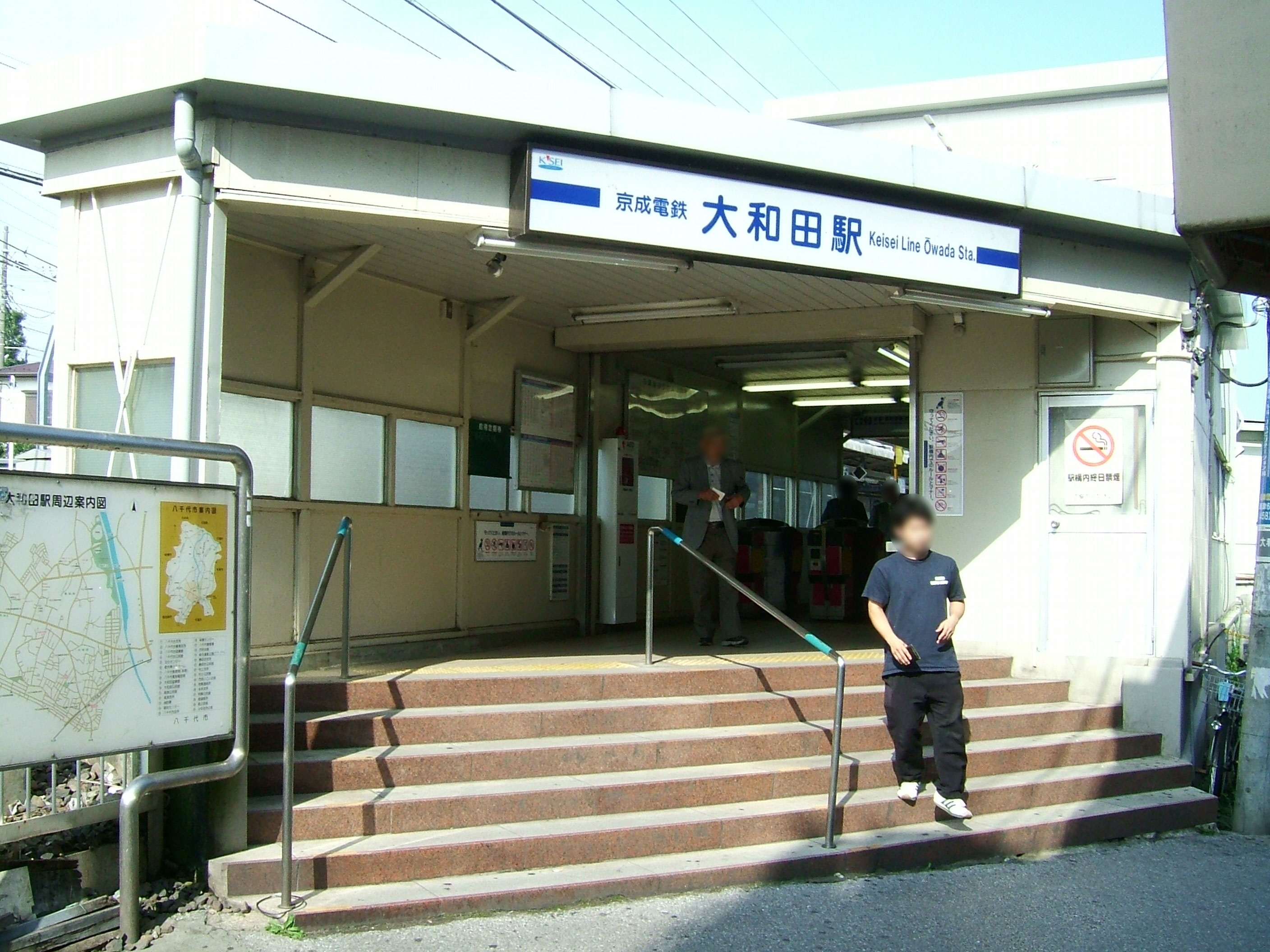
- Keisei-Ōwada Station

General information
- Location: 308 Ōwada, Yachiyo-shi, Chiba-ken 276-0045; Japan
- Coordinates: 35.7125°N 140.1087°E
- Operator: Keisei Electric Railway
- Line: Keisei Main Line
- Distance: 38.7 km from Keisei-Ueno
- Platforms: 2 side platforms

Other information
- Station code: KS30
- Website: Official website

History
- Opened: December 9, 1926

Passengers
- 2019: 12,638 daily

Services
Preceding station	Keisei	Following station
Yachiyodai KS29 towards Keisei Ueno	Main Line Rapid Local	Katsutadai KS31 towards Narita Airport Terminal 1
Location
- Location within Chiba Prefecture Location within Japan

Keisei-Ōwada Station (京成大和田駅, Keisei-Ōwada-eki) is a passenger railway station in the city of Yachiyo, Chiba, Japan, operated by the private railway operator Keisei Electric Railway.

== Lines ==
Keisei-Ōwada Station is served by the Keisei Main Line, and is 38.7 km from the Tokyo terminus at Keisei-Ueno Station.

== Station layout ==
Keisei-Ōwada Station has two opposed side platforms connected by an elevated station building.

=== Platforms ===
1	■ Keisei Main Line	For Keisei-Tsudanuma・Keisei-Takasago・Nippori・Keisei-Ueno
2	■ Keisei Main Line	For Higashi-Narita・Keisei-Narita・Narita Airport

== History ==
Keisei-Ōwada Station was opened on 9 December 1926.

Station numbering was introduced to all Keisei Line stations on 17 July 2010. Keisei-Ōwada Station was assigned station number KS30.

== Passenger statistics ==
In fiscal 2019, the station was used by an average of 12,638 passengers daily.

== Surrounding area ==
- Yachiyo City Hall
- Yachiyo High School

== See also ==
- List of railway stations in Japan
