= Keisei-Usui Station =

Railway station in Sakura, Chiba Prefecture, Japan

KS34 Keisei Usui Station 京成臼井駅
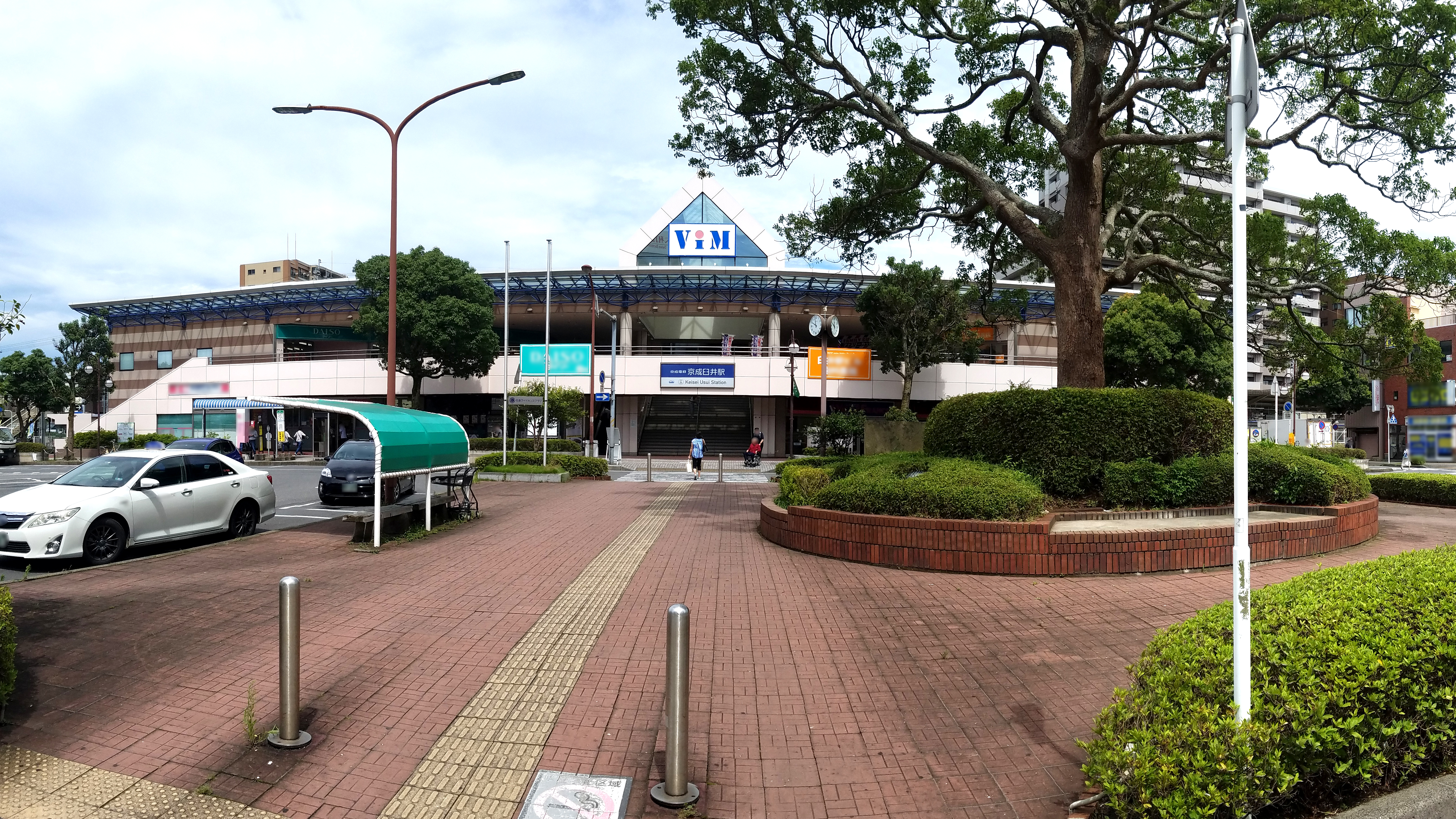
- Keisei Usui Station in July 2020

General information
- Location: 3-30-3 Ojidai, Sakura-shi, Chiba-ken 285-0863; Japan
- Coordinates: 35.7302°N 140.1806°E
- Operator: Keisei Electric Railway
- Line: Keisei Main Line
- Platforms: 2 side platforms

Other information
- Station code: KS34
- Website: Official website

History
- Opened: December 9, 1926

Passengers
- FY2019: 19,787 daily

Services
Preceding station	Keisei	Following station
Yūkarigaoka KS33 towards Keisei Ueno	Main Line Commuter Express Rapid Local	Keisei Sakura KS35 towards Narita Airport Terminal 1
Location
- Location within Chiba Prefecture Location within Japan

Keisei Usui Station (京成臼井駅, Keisei Usui-eki) is a passenger railway station in the city of Sakura, Chiba Prefecture, Japan, operated by the private railway operator Keisei Electric Railway.

== Lines ==
Keisei Usui Station is served by the Keisei Main Line, and lies 45.7 kilometers from the Tokyo terminus of the line at Keisei-Ueno Station. Local, Rapid, and Commuter Express trains stop at this station. Some Commuter Express trains going towards Keisei Takasago Station in the weekday mornings have a dedicatedWomen-only passenger car in car 8. Most of the Local trains during daytime begin service from this station.

== Station layout ==
Keisei Usui Station has two opposed elevated side platforms connected by underpasses to a station building underneath.

=== Platforms ===
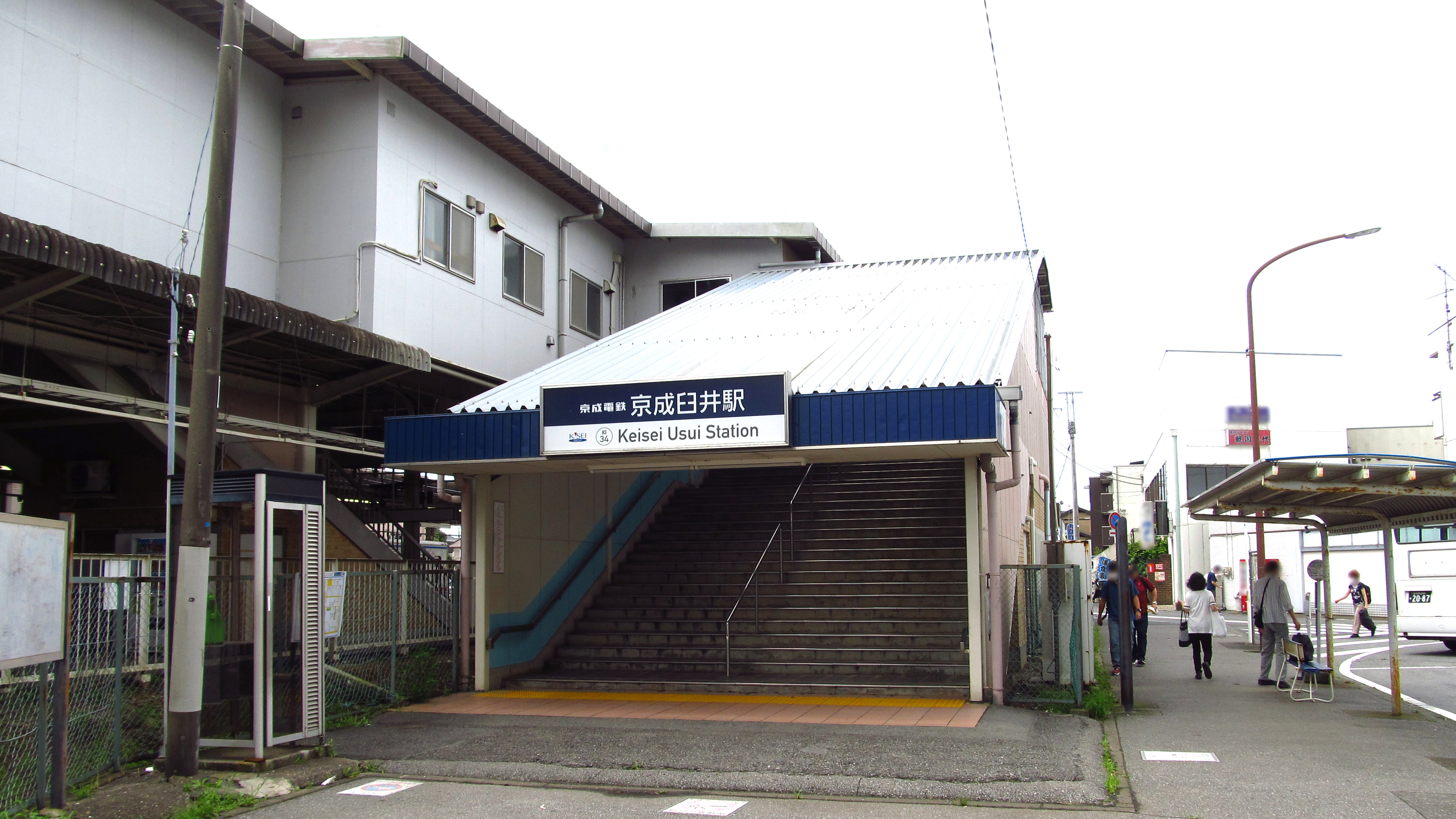
North Entrance

1	Keisei Main Line	for Keisei Tsudanuma, Aoto, Nippori, Keisei Ueno, and Oshiage; Toei Asakusa Line for Nihombashi and Sengakuji; Keikyū Main Line for Haneda Airport (International Terminal and Domestic Terminal)
2	Keisei Main Line	for Keisei Narita and Narita Airport (Terminal 2·3 and Terminal 1)

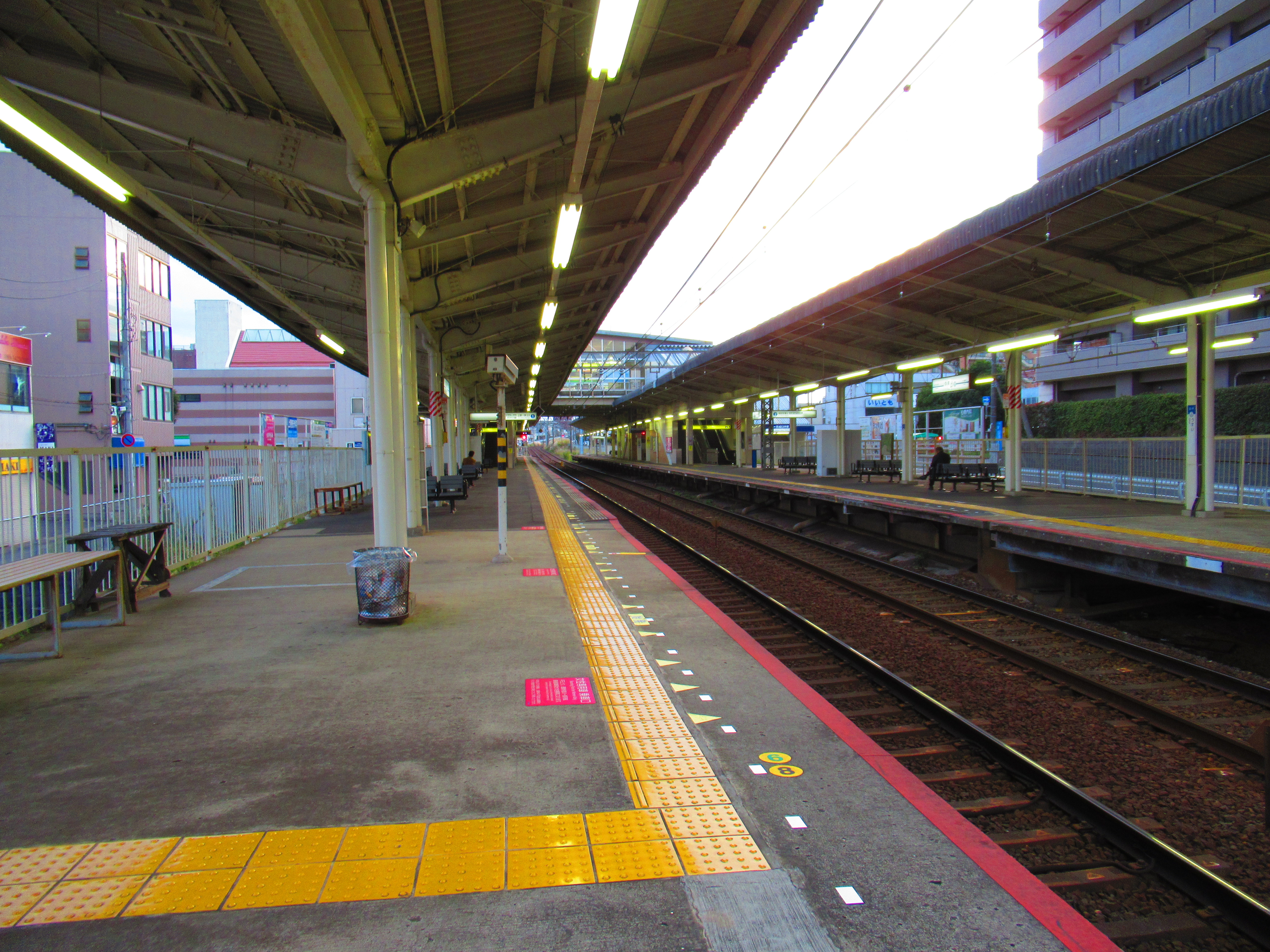
Platforms

== History ==
Keisei Usui Station was opened on 9 December 1926. The station was rebuilt in October 1978, during which time it was physically relocated 580 meters towards Shizu Station. The shopping complex in the station building opened in 1996.

Station numbering was introduced to all Keisei Line stations on 17 July 2010. Keisei Usui Station was assigned station number KS34.

== Buses ==
=== Highway buses ===
Bus stop	Name	Via	Destination	Company	Note
South Exit	Usui・Yūkarigaoka・ShizuーTokyo Line	Tokyo Station・Kokusai-Tenjijō Station	Shinonome Station (Tokyo)	Keisei Bus	Each the highwaybus on weekdays and that on Holidays is only one service departs from this station at 9 a.m. . Fare costs 1050 yen (IC card/ adult). There are facilities that Wi-Fi at free and W・C in the car.

== Passenger statistics ==
In fiscal 2019, the station was used by an average of 19,787 passengers daily.

== Surrounding area ==
- Sakura City Usui Nishi Junior High School
- Sakura City Usui Elementary School

== See also ==
- List of railway stations in Japan
