= Nishi-Nobuto Station =

Railway station in Chiba, Japan

Coordinates: 35.6174°N 140.1027°E

KS57 Nishi-Nobuto Station 西登戸駅
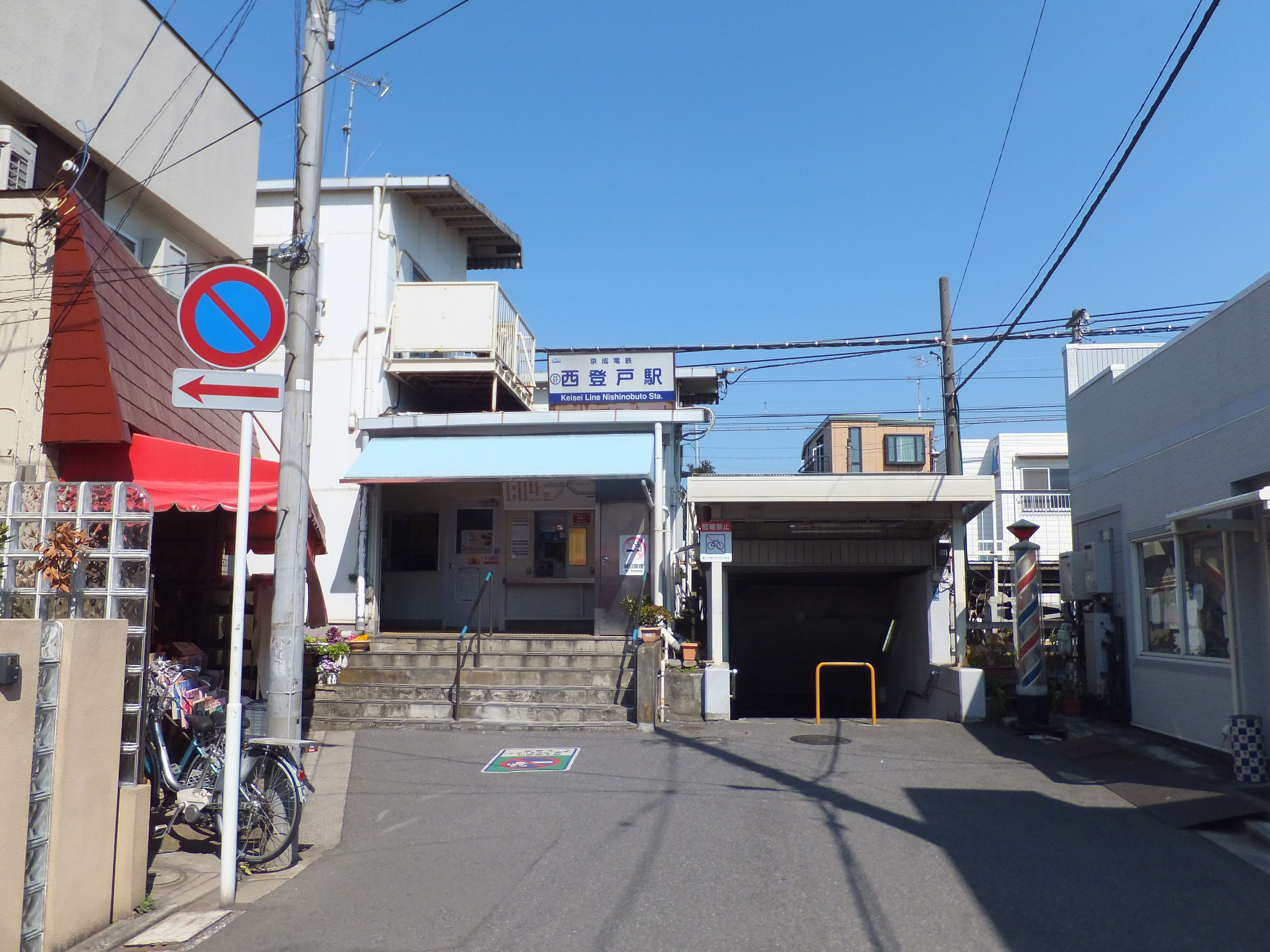
- Nishi-Nobuto Station (March 15, 2012)

General information
- Location: 4-9-1 Nobuto, Chūō-ku, Chiba city, Chiba Prefecture; Japan
- Operator: Keisei Electric Railway
- Line: Keisei Chiba Line

Other information
- Station code: KS57

History
- Opened: 18 March 1922
- Former names: Chiba Kaigan (until 1967)

Passengers
- 2009: 2,213 daily

Services
Preceding station	Keisei	Following station
Midoridai KS56 towards Keisei Tsudanuma	Chiba Line	Shin-Chiba KS58 towards Chiba-Chūō
Location

Nishi-Nobuto Station (西登戸駅, Nishi-Nobuto-eki) is a railway station operated by the Keisei Electric Railway located in Chūō-ku, Chiba city, Chiba Prefecture Japan. It is 10.9 kilometers from the terminus of the Keisei Chiba Line at Keisei Tsudanuma Station.

== History ==
Nishi-Nobuto Station was opened on 18 March 1922 as Chiba Kaigan Station (千葉海岸駅, Chiba-Kaigan-eki). After land reclamation projects altered the shoreline, the station was renamed to its present name on 1 April 1967.

Station numbering was introduced for all Keisei Line stations on 17 July 2010; Nishi-Nobuto Station was assigned station number KS56.

== Lines ==
- Keisei Electric Railway
  - Keisei Chiba Line

== Layout ==
Nishi-Nobuto Station has two opposed side platforms connected by an overpass.

=== Platforms ===
1	Keisei Chiba Line	for Keisei Tsudanuma, Aoto, and Keisei Ueno; Keisei Matsudo Line for Matsudo
2	Keisei Chiba Line	for Keisei Chiba and Chiharadai
