= Yachiyodai Station =

Railway station in Yachiyo, Chiba Prefecture, Japan

KS29 Yachiyodai Station 八千代台駅
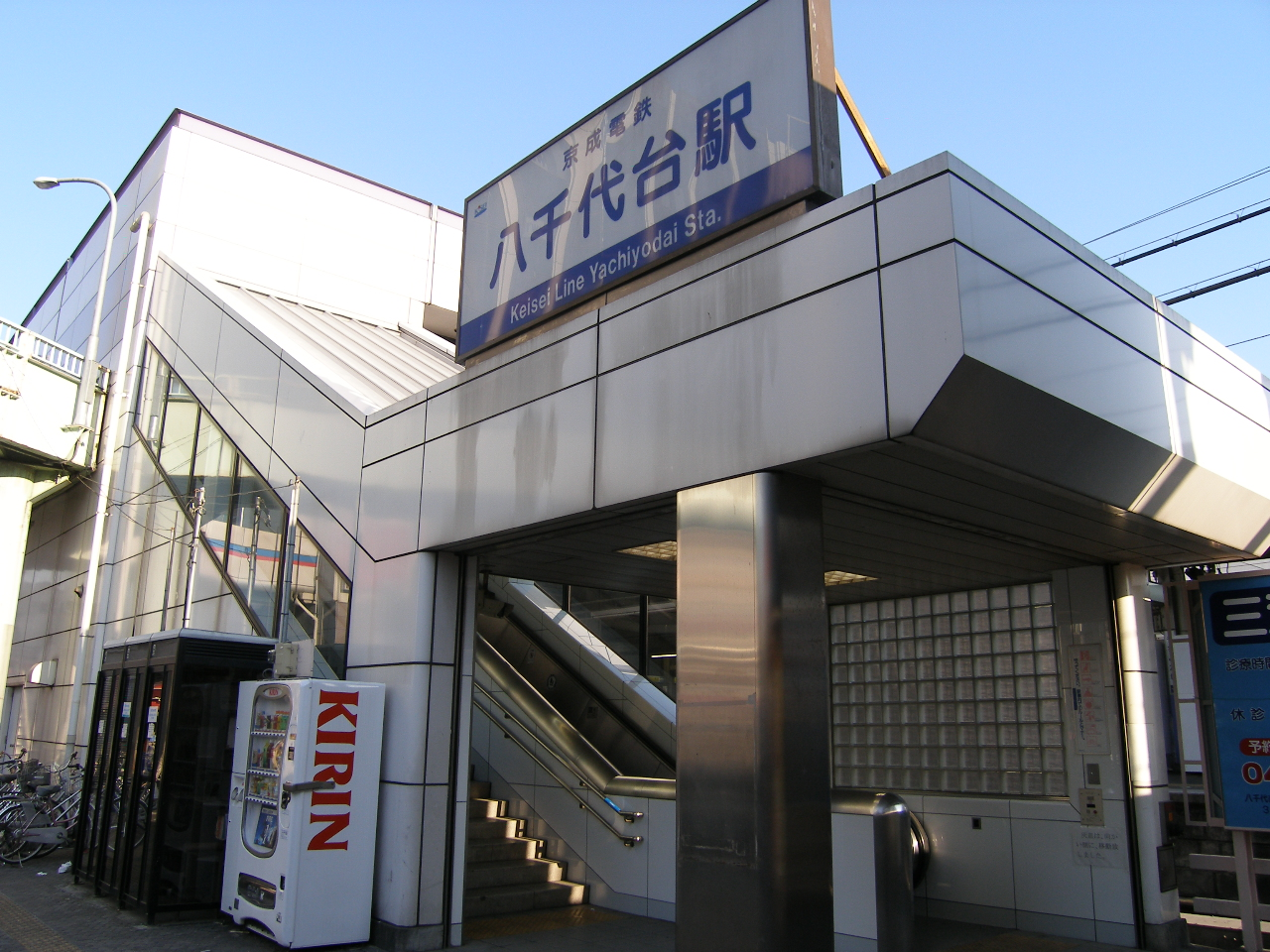
- West entrance of Yachiyodai station

General information
- Location: 1-0 Yachiyodai-Kita, Yachiyo-shi, Chiba-ken 276-0031; Japan
- Coordinates: 35.701420°N 140.090870°E
- Operator: Keisei Electric Railway
- Line: Keisei Main Line
- Distance: 36.6 km from Keisei-Ueno
- Platforms: 2 island platforms

Other information
- Station code: KS29
- Website: Official website

History
- Opened: March 20, 1956

Passengers
- FY2019: 45,975 daily

Services
Preceding station	Keisei	Following station
Keisei Funabashi KS22 towards Keisei Ueno	Morningliner; Eveningliner	Keisei Sakura KS35 towards Narita Airport Terminal 1
Keisei Tsudanuma KS26 towards Keisei Ueno	Main Line Rapid Limited Express Limited Express Commuter Express	Katsutadai KS31 towards Narita Airport Terminal 1
Mimomi KS28 towards Keisei Ueno	Main Line Rapid Local	Keisei Ōwada KS30 towards Narita Airport Terminal 1
Location
- Location within Chiba Prefecture Location within Japan

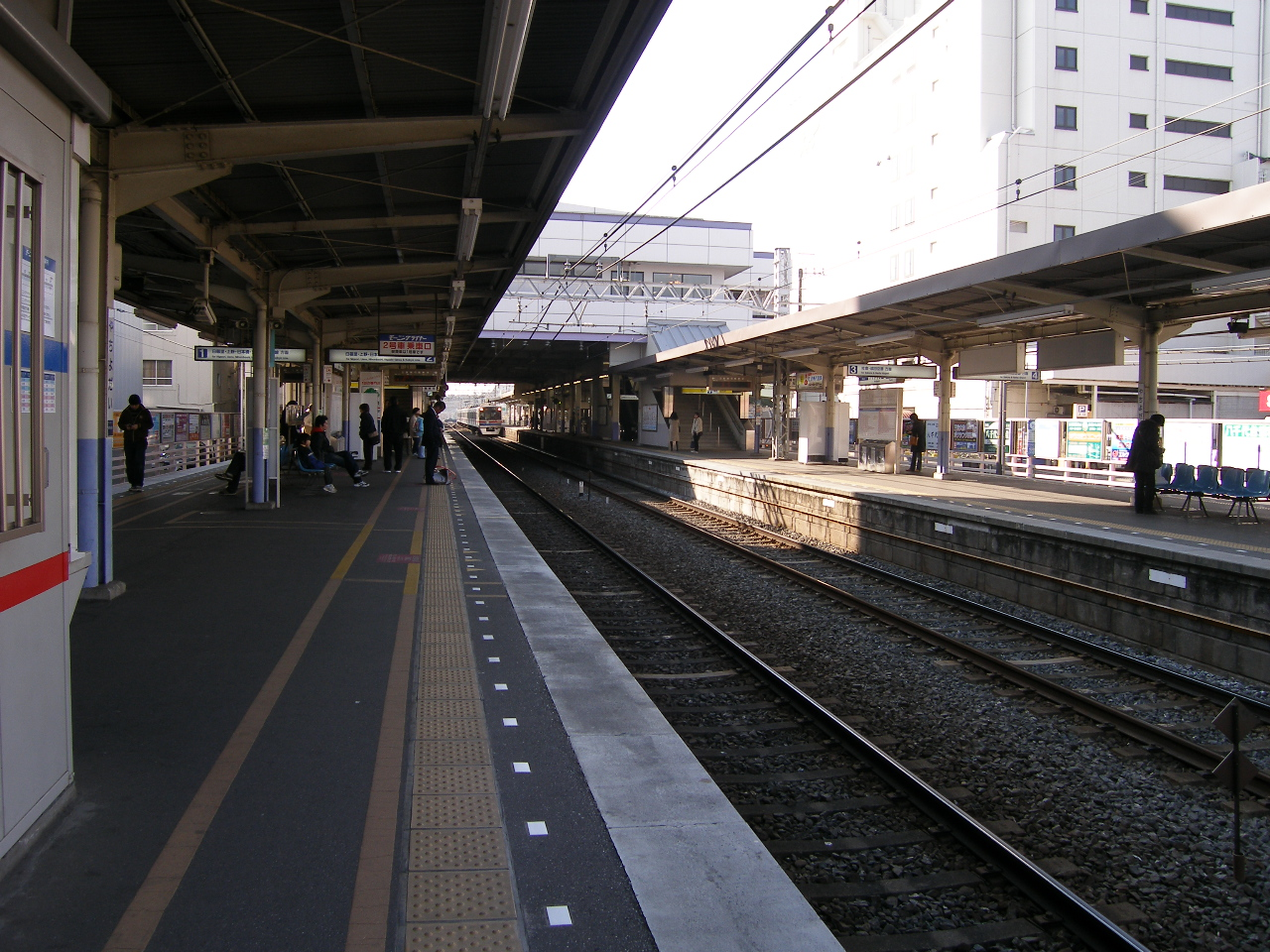
Platforms of Yachiyodai

Yachiyodai Station (八千代台駅, Yachiyodai-eki) is a passenger railway station in the city of Yachiyo, Chiba, Japan, operated by the private railway operator Keisei Electric Railway.

== Lines ==
Yachiyodai Station is served by the Keisei Main Line, and is located 36.6 km from the Tokyo terminus of the Keisei Main Line at Keisei-Ueno Station.

== Station layout ==
The station has two island platforms connected by an elevated station building.

=== Platforms ===
1, 2	Keisei Main Line	for Keisei Funabashi, Aoto, Nippori, Keisei Ueno, and Oshiage
3, 4	Keisei Main Line	for Katsutadai, Keisei Narita, and Narita Airport (Terminal 2·3 and Terminal 1)

== History ==
Yachiyodai Station opened on 20 March 1956. The East Exit of the station was completed in 1968, and the new elevated station building in 1969. The station building was renovated in 1993.

Station numbering was introduced to all Keisei Line stations on 17 July 2010. Yachiyodai Station was assigned station number KS29.

== Passenger statistics ==
In fiscal 2019, the station was used by an average of 45,975 passengers daily.

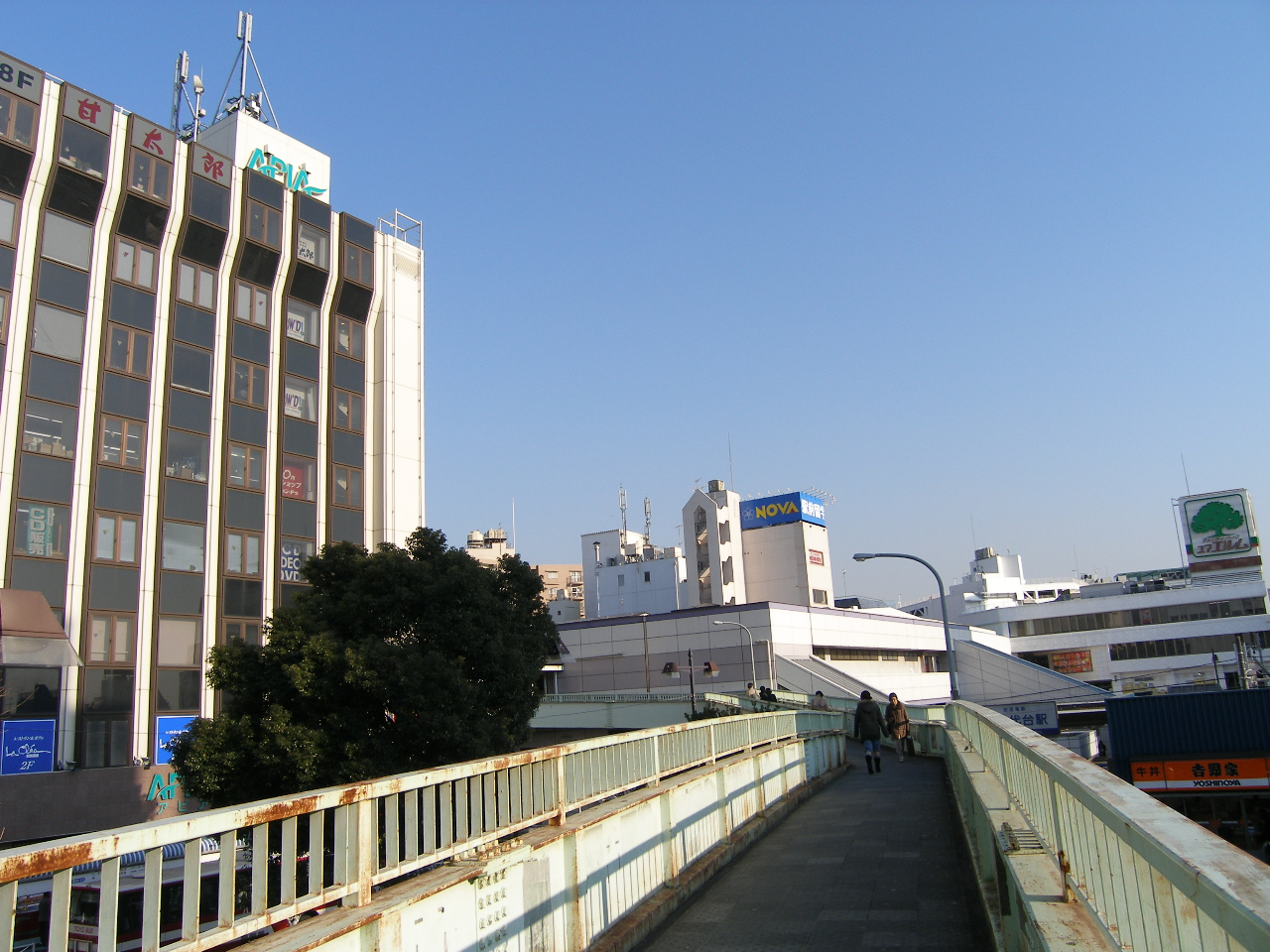
Station plaza on the west side

== Surrounding area ==
- Yachiyo City Office, Yachiyodai sub-office

== See also ==
- List of railway stations in Japan
