= Midori-dai Station =

Railway station in Chiba, Japan

KS56 Midoridai Station みどり台駅
- Midoridai Station

General information
- Location: 1-7-1 Midori-cho, Inage, Chiba, Chiba （千葉県千葉市稲毛区緑町1-7-1） Japan
- Coordinates: 35.6250°N 140.0976°E
- Operator: Keisei Electric Railway
- Line: Keisei Chiba Line

Other information
- Station code: KS56

History
- Opened: 1923
- Former names: Kurosuna; Hama-Kaigan; Teidai Kogakubu-mae; Kogakubu-mae (until 1971)

Passengers
- FY2010: 6,579 daily

Services
Preceding station	Keisei	Following station
Keisei Inage KS55 towards Keisei Tsudanuma	Chiba Line	Nishi-Nobuto KS57 towards Chiba-Chūō
Location

Midoridai Station (みどり台駅, Midoridai-eki) is a railway station in Inage-ku, Chiba, Japan, operated by the Keisei Electric Railway.

== Lines ==
Midoridai Station is served by the Keisei Chiba Line, and is located 9.9 km from the terminus of the line at Keisei-Tsudanuma.

== Station layout ==
Midoridai Station has two opposed side platforms connected by an overpass.

=== Platforms ===
1	Keisei Chiba Line	for Keisei Tsudanuma, Aoto, and Keisei Ueno; Keisei Matsudo Line for Matsudo
2	Keisei Chiba Line	for Keisei Chiba and Chiharadai

== History ==
Midoridai Station was opened on 22 February 1922 as Hama Kaigan Station (浜海岸駅, Hama-Kaigan-eki). On 1 April 1942, it changed its name to Teidai Kogakubu-mae (帝大工学部前駅, Teidai Kogakubu-mae eki), after the engineering campus of Tokyo Imperial University located nearby. After World War II, university dropped the name "Imperial", and the station was renamed Kogakubu-mae (工学部前駅, Kogakubu-mae-eki) accordingly. It was renamed once again on 1 May 1951 to Kurosuna Station (黒砂駅, Kurosuna-eki). It assumed its present name on 1 October 1971.

Station numbering was introduced to all Keisei Line stations on 17 July 2010; Midoridai Station was assigned station number KS56.
