= Keisei Sakura Station =

Railway station in Sakura, Chiba Prefecture, Japan

KS35 Keisei-Sakura Station 京成佐倉駅
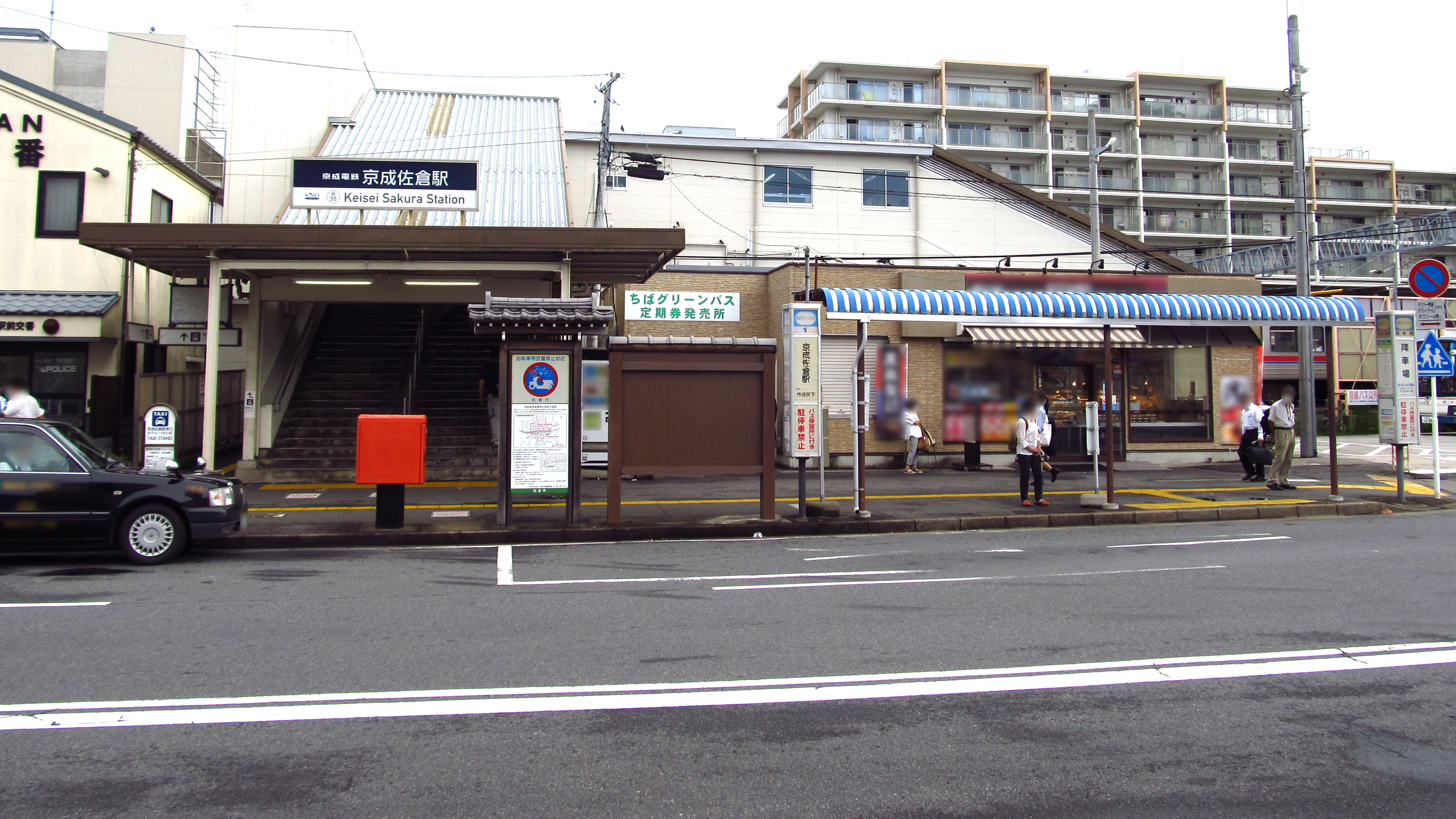
- The south-side entrance to the station in July 2020

General information
- Location: 1001-5 Sakae-cho, Sakura-shi, Chiba-ken 285-0014; Japan
- Coordinates: 35.725176°N 140.229718°E
- Operator: Keisei Electric Railway
- Line: Keisei Main Line
- Distance: 51.0 km from Keisei-Ueno
- Platforms: 2 island platforms

Other information
- Station code: KS35
- Website: Official website

History
- Opened: December 9, 1926

Passengers
- FY2019: 18,305 daily

Services
Preceding station	Keisei	Following station
Yachiyodai KS29 towards Keisei Ueno	Morningliner; Eveningliner	Keisei Narita KS40 towards Narita Airport Terminal 1
Katsutadai KS31 towards Keisei Ueno	Main Line Rapid Limited Express	Keisei Narita KS40 towards Narita Airport Terminal 1
Katsutadai KS31 towards Keisei Ueno	Main Line Limited Express	Ōsakura KS36 towards Narita Airport Terminal 1
Keisei Usui KS34 towards Keisei Ueno	Main Line Commuter Express Rapid Local	Ōsakura KS36 towards Narita Airport Terminal 1
Location
- Location within Chiba Prefecture Location within Japan

Keisei-Sakura Station (京成佐倉駅, Keisei-Sakura-eki) is a passenger railway station in the city of Sakura, Chiba Prefecture, Japan, operated by the private railway operator Keisei Electric Railway.

== Lines ==
Keisei-Sakura Station is served by the Keisei Main Line, and lies 51.0 kilometers from the Tokyo terminus of the line at Keisei-Ueno Station.

== Station layout ==
The station consists of two island platforms connected to an elevated station building.

=== Platforms ===
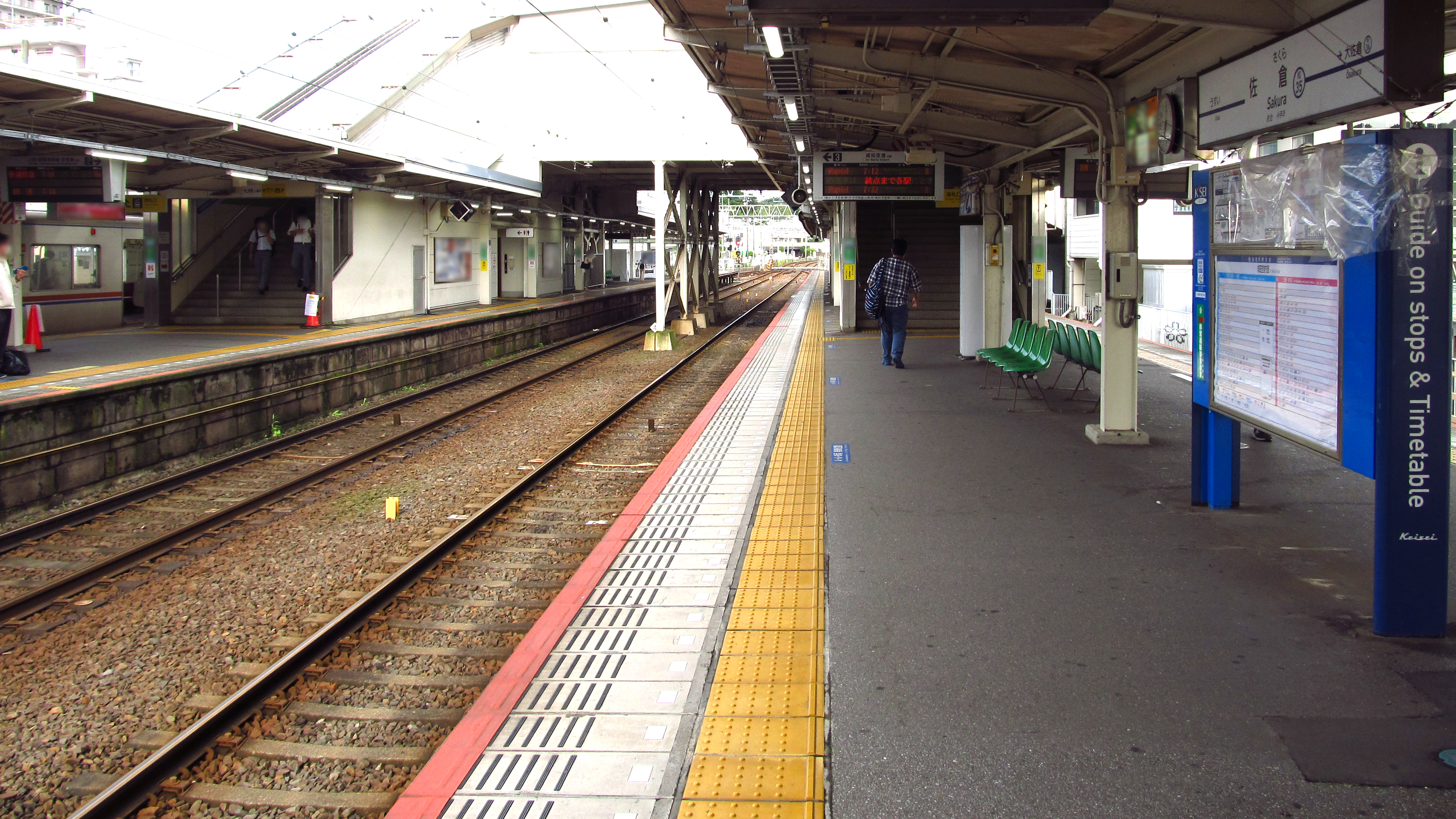
Platforms in July 2020

1, 2	Keisei Main Line	for Keisei Funabashi, Aoto, Nippori, Keisei Ueno, and Oshiage
3, 4	Keisei Main Line	for Keisei Narita and Narita Airport (Terminal 2·3 and Terminal 1)

== History ==
Keisei-Sakura Station was opened on 9 December 1926, slightly to the south of its present location. The station was rebuilt in its present location in 1962.

Station numbering was introduced to all Keisei Line stations on 17 July 2010. Keisei-Sakura Station was assigned station number KS35.

== Passenger statistics ==
In fiscal 2019, the station was used by an average of 18,305 passengers daily.

== Surrounding area ==
- Sakura City Hall
- Chiba Inba Government Building

== See also ==
- List of railway stations in Japan
