= Makuhari =

Area in Chiba City, Japan

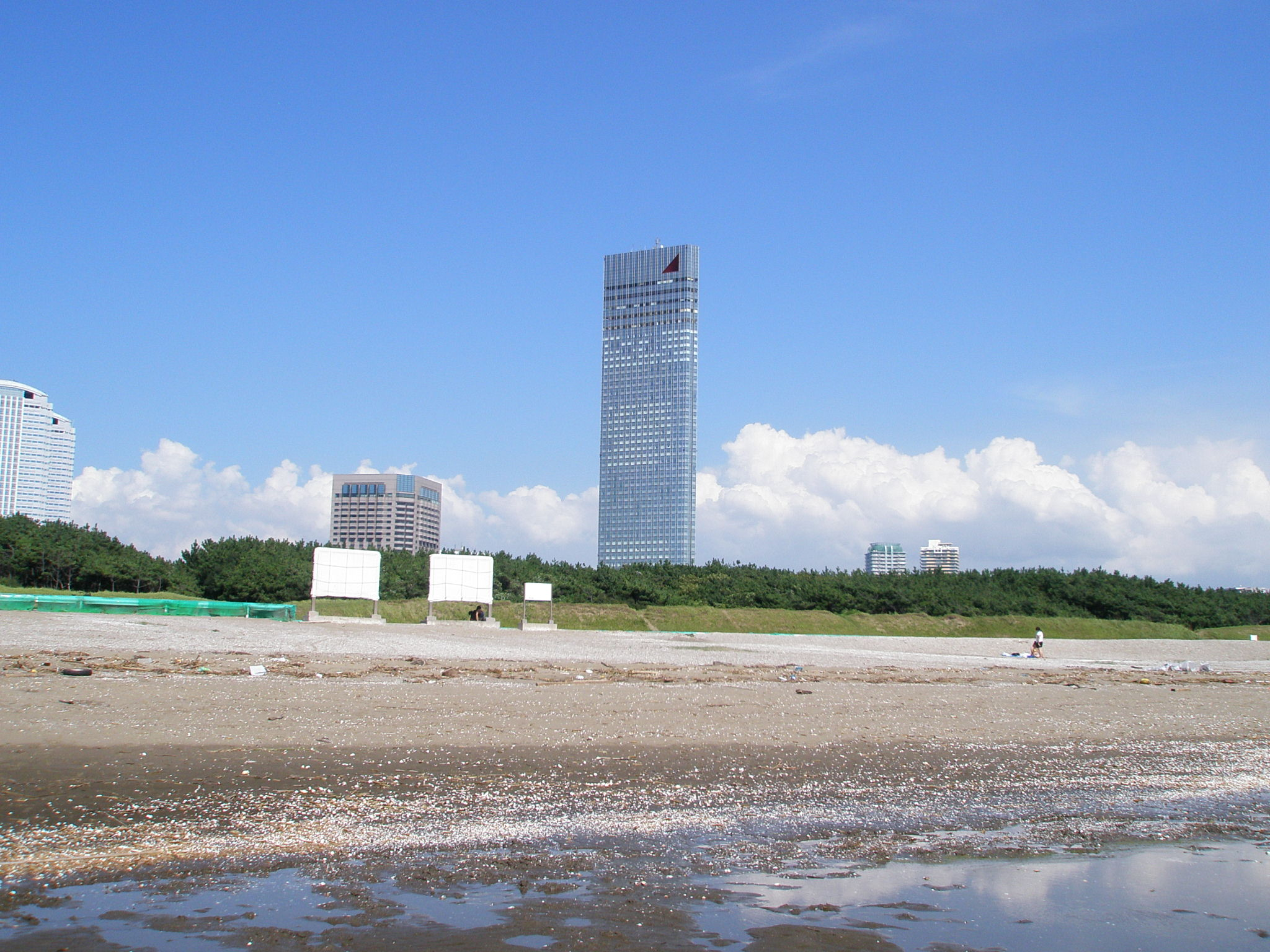
Beach of Makuhari

Makuhari (幕張) is a community in Chiba City, Chiba Prefecture, Japan. It is within Hanamigawa-ku and Mihama-ku.

The seaside area of Makuhari was reclaimed from the sea. The district was constructed in a span of 10 years. Steven Poole, author of Trigger Happy, described it as "Japan's own vision of the future now". Poole added that is a "shrine to techno-optimism" that "looks just like a city out of a video game".

== History and Geography ==
Historically, the Shimosa Plateau formed sea cliffs along Tokyo Bay In the Edo period villages appeared in the valleys of the small rivers that cut the plateau. From the west, these villages were Yatsu Village, Kuguta Village (at the Kikuta River), Saginuma Village which is now Narashino City, Makuwari Village (at the Hamada River), Kemigawa Village (at the Hanami River), Inage Village, and Kurosuna Village (near present-day Inage just west of Chiba City center). The Makurahi area is bounded by medium-sized alluvial plains, from the Ebi River estuary lowland at the center of Funabashi City in the west to the Miyako River estuary lowland near the center of Chiba City in the east.

Makuhari Village was formed when Maga Village, centered in the valley of the Hamada River, merged with the villages of Takeshi, Amado, Chosaku, and Mimomi upstream. Makuhari Village cultivated rice paddies in the lowlands of the Hamada River valley and field crops on the surrounding plateaus. Sand dunes spread between the mouths of the Hamada River and the Hanami River to the east. This area was once known for producing high-quality carrots, most famously the "Makuhari Carrots" brand. Today, only a few fields remain on the plateau on the west bank of the Hamada River and on the sand dunes on the east bank. The soil on the west bank near Makuhari Hongo Station is reddish brown, typical of the Kanto Loam layer, while the fields on the east bank near Makuhari Station are a whitish sand color, showing the different characteristics of the fields in the two areas.

During the 1960s and 1970s, land was reclaimed along Tokyo Bay including what is now the Makuhari area of Mihama Ward. The area centered on the Hamada River, from the border between Chiba City and Narashino City in the west, to the Hanami River in the east, was originally named the "Makuhari Landfill".

Makuharihongo Station on the Japan Railways Sobu Line is located on a plateau just to the west of the lowland area of the Hamada River valley. Makuhari Station is located on a sand dune to the east. At the top of the sand dunes on the south side of Keisei Makuhari Station is the Kon'yo Shrine.

== Attractions ==
- Makuhari Messe
- Chiba Marine Stadium
- Tokyo Disney Resort is a 20-minute train ride from Kaihimmakuhari Station; the area's six hotels are a popular lodging spot for visitors to the resort.

== Transport ==
- Makuhari Station
- Makuharihongō Station
- Kaihimmakuhari Station
- Makuharitoyosuna Station
- Keisei Makuhari Station
- Keisei Makuharihongō Station

== Places ==
=== Hanamigawa Ward ===
- Makuharicho
- Makuharihongo

=== Mihama Ward ===
- Makuhari-nishi
- Hamada
- Toyosuna
- Wakaba
- Nakase
- Hibino
- Utase
- Mihama

== Education ==
- Chiba Prefectural University of Health Sciences
- Kanda University of International Studies
- The Open University of Japan
- Tohto University
- Makuhari Junior and Senior High School, a private school operated by Shibuya Kyouiku Gakuen, opened in 1983 as the Makuhari Senior High School.
- Makuhari Sohgoh High School
- Showa Gakuin Shuei Junior and Senior High School
- Makuhari International School, a private international school
