= Aoki Konyō =

Confucian scholar

- 青木昆陽
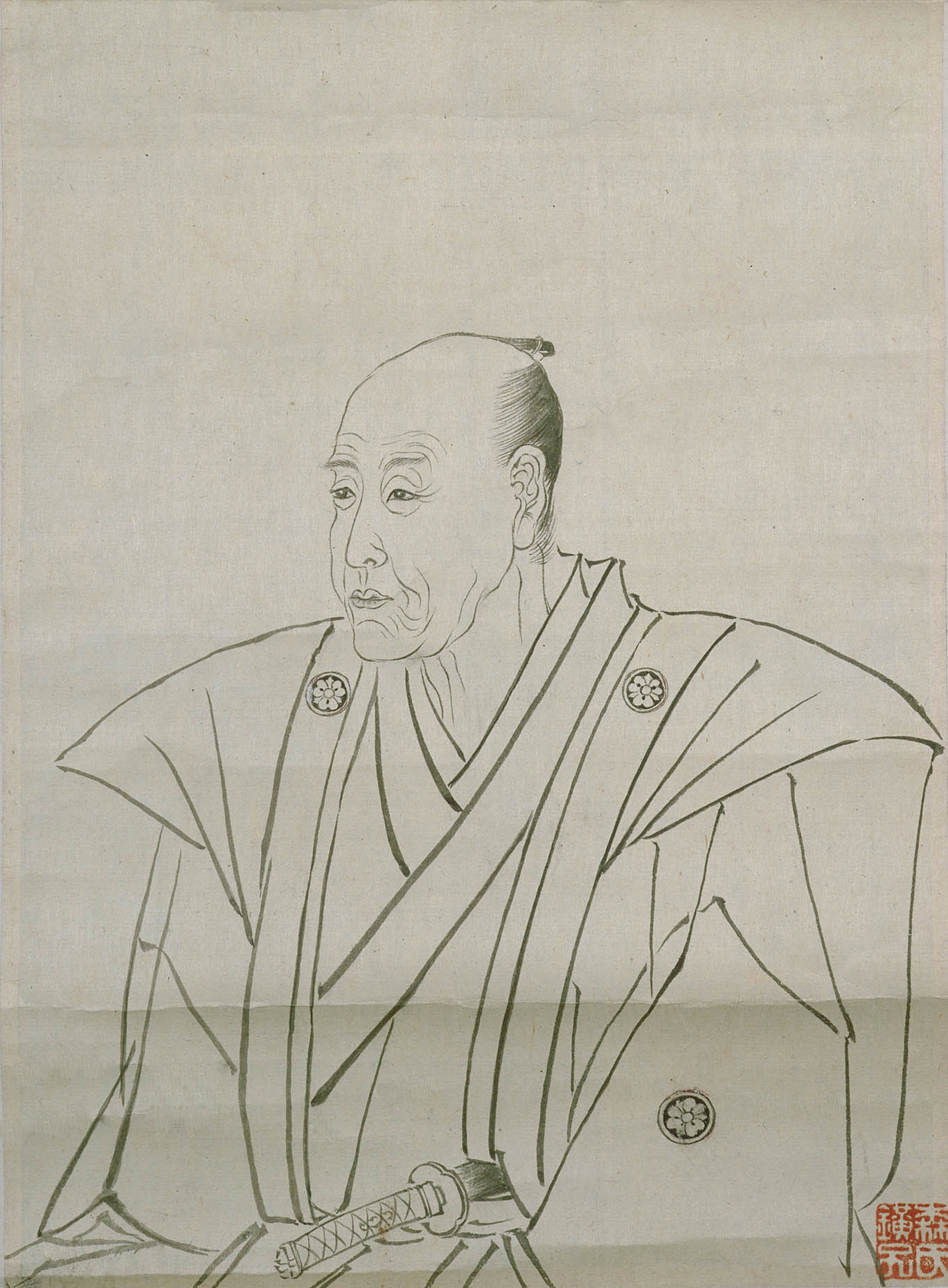
- Born: June 19, 1689; Nihonbashi, Edo, Japan
- Died: November 9, 1769 (aged 80); Shimomeguro, Edo, Japan
- Occupations: Confucian scholar, agronomist

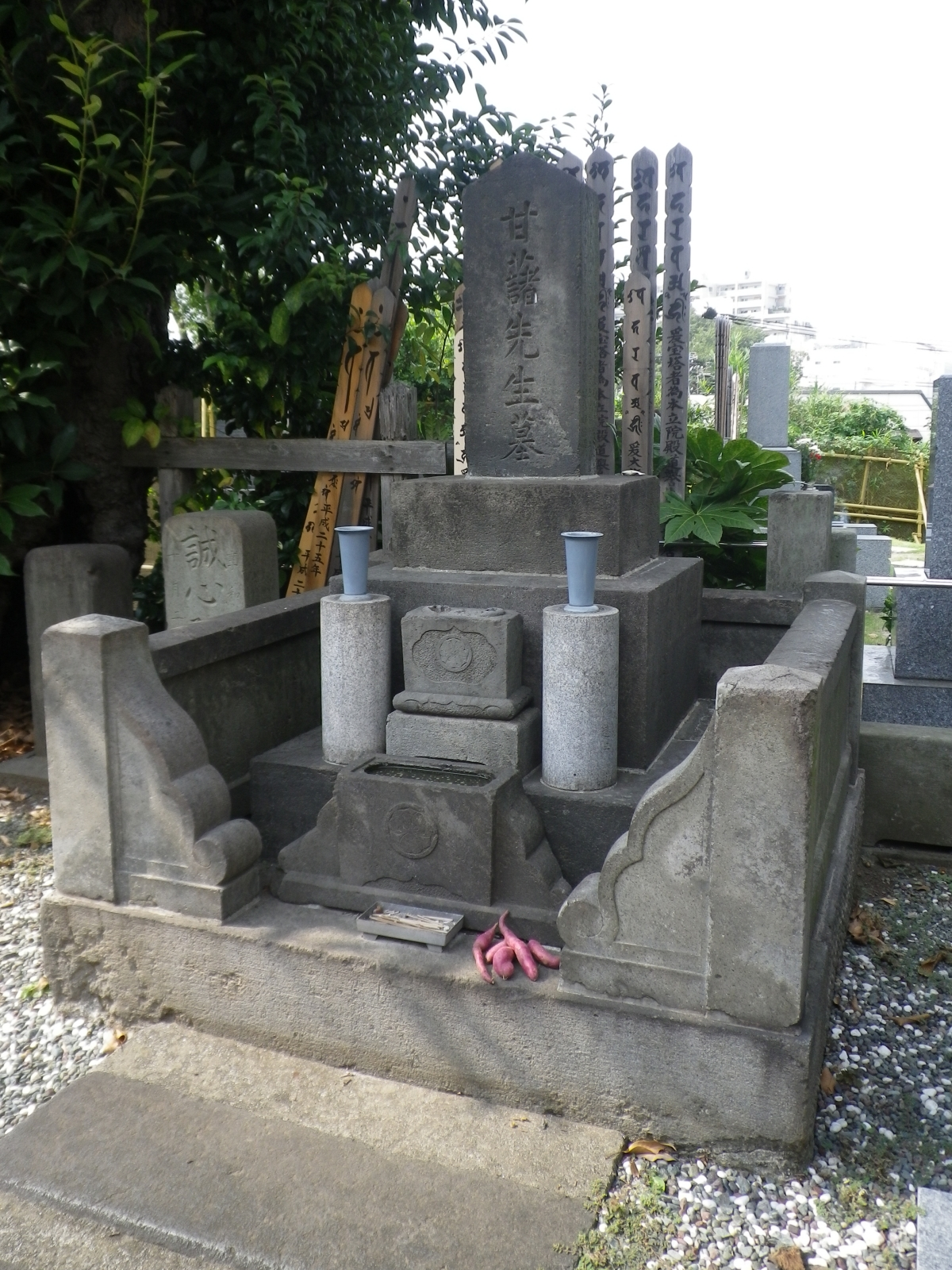
Aoki Konyō grave at Ryusen-ji, Tokyo

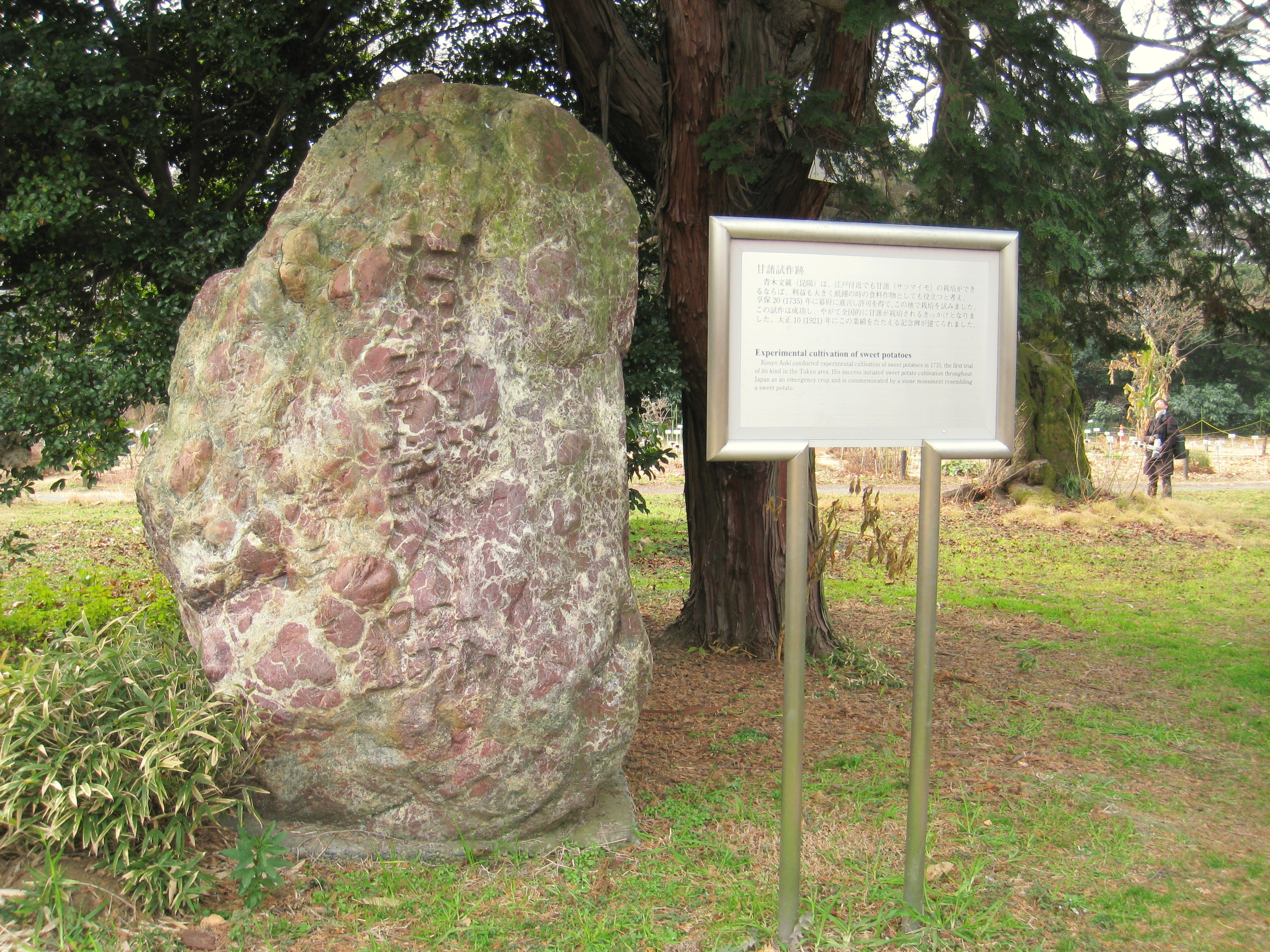
Sweet Potato Monument at Koishikawa Botanical Gardens

Aoki Konyō (青木昆陽; June 19, 1689 – November 9, 1769) was a Confucian scholar, minor hatamoto and pioneer rangaku scholar in early Edo period Japan. He is also credited with introducing the cultivation of sweet potato to many parts of Japan.

== Biography ==
Aoki was born in the Nihonbashi district of Edo, as the first son of a fishmonger Tsukudaya Han’emon. Nothing is known about his childhood or early education. He later studied Confucianism in Kyoto under Itō Tōgai, the son and successor of the famous Confucian philosopher Itō Jinsai. After his return in Edo, he was given access to the Tokugawa shogunate's library, the Momijiyama-bunko, within Edo Castle in 1733 through the intercession of Ōoka Tadasuke, the Edo machi-bugyō. During the middle of the Edo period, Japan frequently suffered from crop failures caused by inclement weather and natural disasters, resulting in widespread famine and political and social unrest. This included the Kyōhō famine of 1732 to 1733, which resulted in a population loss of 20% in some areas of western Japan. However, it came to Aoki's attention that the island of Ōmishima in the Seto Inland Sea had largely escaped the effects of the famine as the islanders had planted a new type of sweet potato which had been grown in Satsuma Province since 1711. This new Satsuma-imo had arrived in Ming China from South America via the Philippines and to Satsuma from their overlordship over the Ryūkyū islands. Aoki wrote a treatise called "Thoughts on the Barbarian Yams" describing the new food source, which caught the attention of senior officials. He was appointed to an official post as "Satsuma-imo commissioner", thus making a change in status from a commoner to a samurai. In his new position he oversaw the successful cultivation of the new crop at the government's Koishikawa Botanical Garden and at experimental fields at villages called Makuwari (present day Hanamigawa-ku, Chiba) and Fudōdō (present day Kujūkuri, Chiba). The new crop proved to be an invaluable source of food in later famines. The village of Makuwari is now called Makuhari in what is now Chiba Prefecture, and the site of the experimental sweet potato field is a Chiba Prefectural Historic Site

In 1739, Aoki was entrusted with the acquisition of books and writings for the Momijiyama-bunko, and in this position he gathered historical documents from Kai, Shinano, Mikawa Province, and other locations, which he copied and annotated under the title "Ancient writings in some provinces" (Shoshū komonjo).

In 1740, together with the doctor and herbalist Noro Genjō (野呂元丈, 1693–1761), he was assigned to learn the Dutch language. Since the middle of the 17th century, translation and interpretation between the Japanese and Dutch East India Company post at Dejima in Nagasaki has been a monopoly held by a small group of hereditary "Dutch interpreters" who were appointed and supervised by the local governor. Under the Shogun Tokugawa Yoshimune this monopoly was broken, and the official policy of the government changed to more intensively acquire and disseminate European technology. Aoki moved to Nagasaki for a short time and was able to master Dutch to the extent that he wrote introductions to the Dutch language and script and produced fragmentary translations from Dutch works on natural science and herbology. Although he did not get beyond comparatively rudimentary language skills and rough translations, he became a model for other scholars and the forerunner of the field of study which was later termed rangaku.

In 1744 Aoki was appointed fire guard of the Momijiyama-bunko library. Three years later he was transferred to the Hyōjōsho, the senior council within the shogunal administration. In 1767 he was appointed administrator of the Momijiyama-bunko library. Aoki died in 1769 during an influenza epidemic at the age of 80.

His grave at the temple of Ryūsen-ji in Meguro, Tokyo was designated a National Historic Site in 1943.

== Bibliography ==
- Shoshū komonjo, 諸州古文書
- Banshokō, 1735 蕃薯考
- Oranda bunyaku, 和蘭文訳
- Sōro zatsudan, 1738 草盧雑談
- Oranda moji ryakkō, 和蘭文字略考
- Keizai sanyō, 経済纂要
- Kansho no ki, 1745 『甘藷記』延享2年刊
