= Makuharicho =

Makuharicho 幕張町
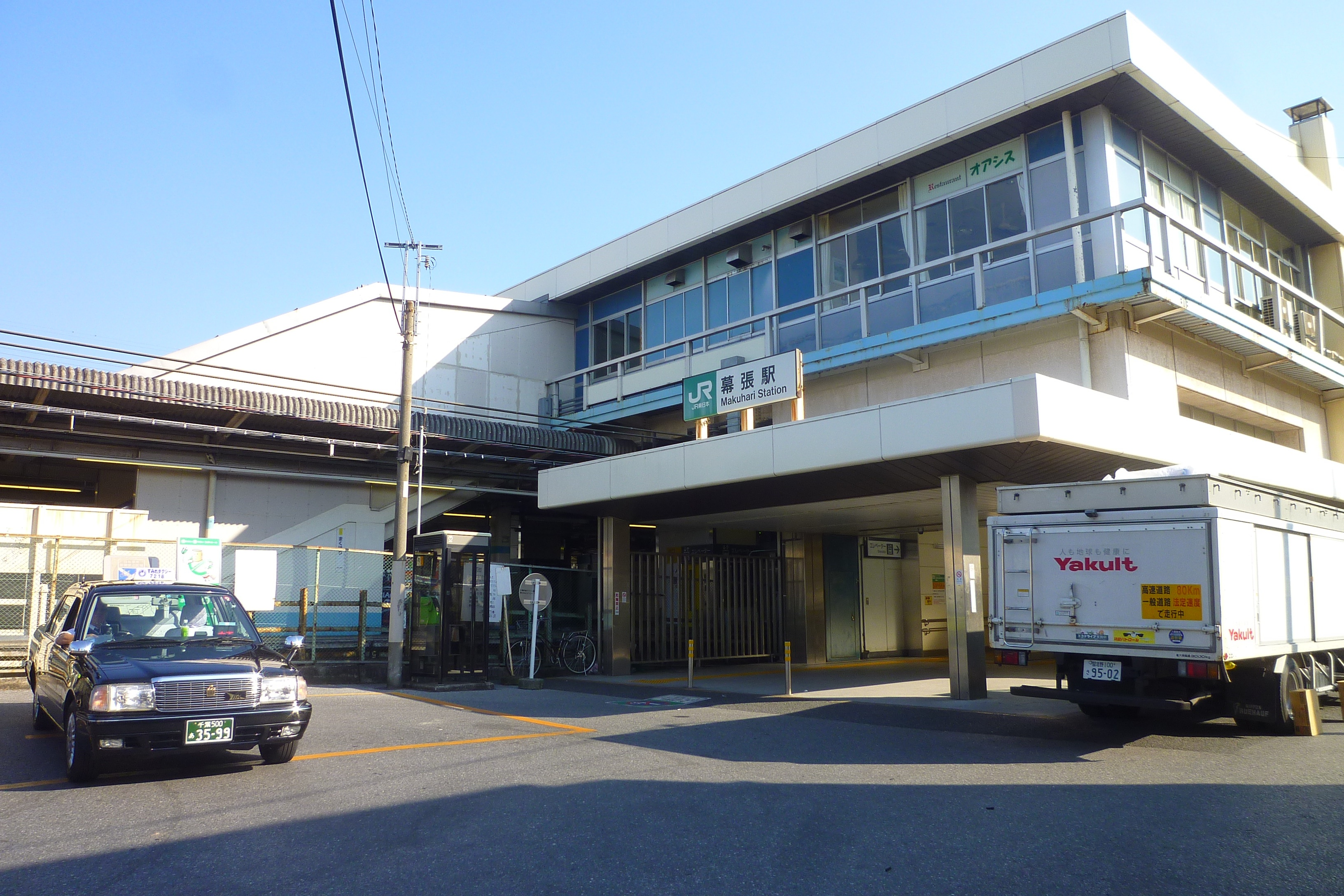
- Makuhari Station

- Location within Chiba Prefecture
- Coordinates: 35.6592°N 140.0554°E
- Country: Japan
- Prefecture: Chiba Prefecture
- City: Chiba City
- Ward: Hanamigawa Ward

Population (December 2017)
  - Total: 28,729
- Time zone: UTC+9 (Japan Standard Time)
- Postal code: 262-0032
- Area code: 043
- Vehicle registration: Chiba

Makuharicho (幕張町, Makuhari-chō) is a district of Hanamigawa Ward, Chiba City, Chiba Prefecture, Japan, consisting of 1-chōme to 6-chōme.

== Transportation ==
=== Railroads ===
- JR East – Chūō-Sōbu Line
  - Makuhari
- Keisei Electric Railway – Keisei Chiba Line
  - Keisei Makuhari

== See also ==
- Makuhari
- Makuharihongo
- Makuhari-nishi
