= Makuhari-nishi =

District in Chiba city, Japan

Makuhari-nishi 幕張西
- Location within Chiba Prefecture
- Coordinates: 35.6638°N 140.0358°E
- Country: Japan
- Prefecture: Chiba Prefecture
- City: Chiba City
- Ward: Mihama Ward

Area
  - Total: 0.93 km^{2} (0.36 sq mi)

Population (March 2018)
  - Total: 8,099
  - Density: 8,700/km^{2} (23,000/sq mi)
- Time zone: UTC+9 (Japan Standard Time)
- Postal code: 261-0026
- Vehicle registration: Chiba

Makuhari-nishi (幕張西) is a district of Mihama Ward, Chiba City, Chiba Prefecture, Japan, consisting of 1-chōme to 6-chōme. The district entirely consists of reclaimed land from Tokyo Bay. In 1-chōme to 4-chōme the newer Jūkyo-hyōji (住居表示) style is adopted, while in 5-chōme and 6-chōme the older chiban (地番) style is adopted.

== Geography ==
The district is located on the western part of Mihama Ward.

=== Surrounding districts ===
Mihama Ward, Chiba City

- Hamada

Hanamigawa Ward, Chiba City

- Makuharicho
- Makuharihongo

Narashino City

- Kasumi
- Sodegaura

== Demographics ==
The population as of March 2018 is shown below.

Chōme	Population	Density (/km^{2})
1-chōme	1,490	9,186
2-chōme	1,555	7,889
3-chōme	1,627	12,310
4-chōme	1,737	14,630
5-chōme	618	7,943
6-chōme	1,072	4,430
Total	8,099	8,709

== Transportation ==
- Keiyo Road Makuhari IC

=== Bus service ===
- Keisei Bus
  - Makuhari-nishi 2-chome - Makuhari-nishi 3rd Park
  - Makuhari-nishi 2-chome - Makuhari-nishi Junior High School - Makuhari-nishi 2nd Park
  - Makuhari-nishi 2-chome - Makuhari-nishi Junior High School - Makuhari Kopo-mae - Makuhari-nishi 5-chome - Makuhari-nishi 6-chome

== Education ==
- Chiba City Makuhari-nishi Junior High School
- Chiba City Makuhari-nishi Elementary School

== See also ==
- Makuhari
