= Kemigawacho =

Kemigawacho 検見川町
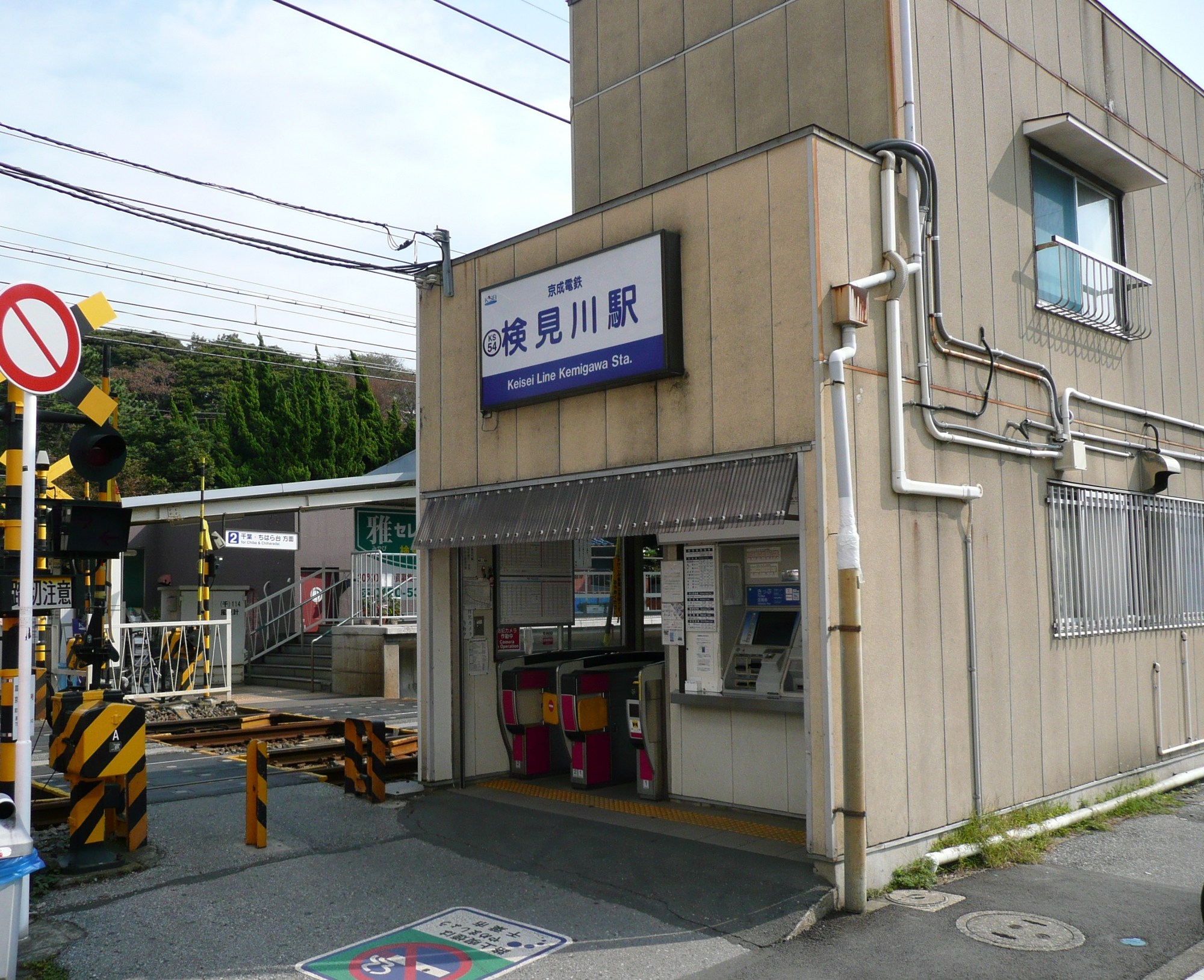
- Kemigawa Station

- Location within Chiba Prefecture
- Coordinates: 35.6514°N 140.0662°E
- Country: Japan
- Prefecture: Chiba Prefecture
- City: Chiba City
- Ward: Hanamigawa Ward

Population (December 2017)
  - Total: 11,494
- Time zone: UTC+9 (Japan Standard Time)
- Postal code: 262-0023
- Area code: 043
- Vehicle registration: Chiba

Kemigawacho (検見川町, Kemigawa-chō) is a district of Hanamigawa Ward, Chiba City, Chiba Prefecture, Japan, consisting of 1-chōme to 3-chōme, and 5-chōme.

== Demographics ==
The number of households and population as of December 2017 are shown below.

| Chōme | Households | Population |
|---|---|---|
| 1-chōme | 616 | 1,145 |
| 2-chōme | 723 | 1,329 |
| 3-chōme | 2,622 | 5,428 |
| 5-chōme | 1,695 | 3,592 |
| Total | 5,656 | 11,494 |

== Transportation ==
=== Railroads ===
- Keisei Electric Railway – Keisei Chiba Line
  - Kemigawa
