= Makuharihongo =

Makuharihongo 幕張本郷
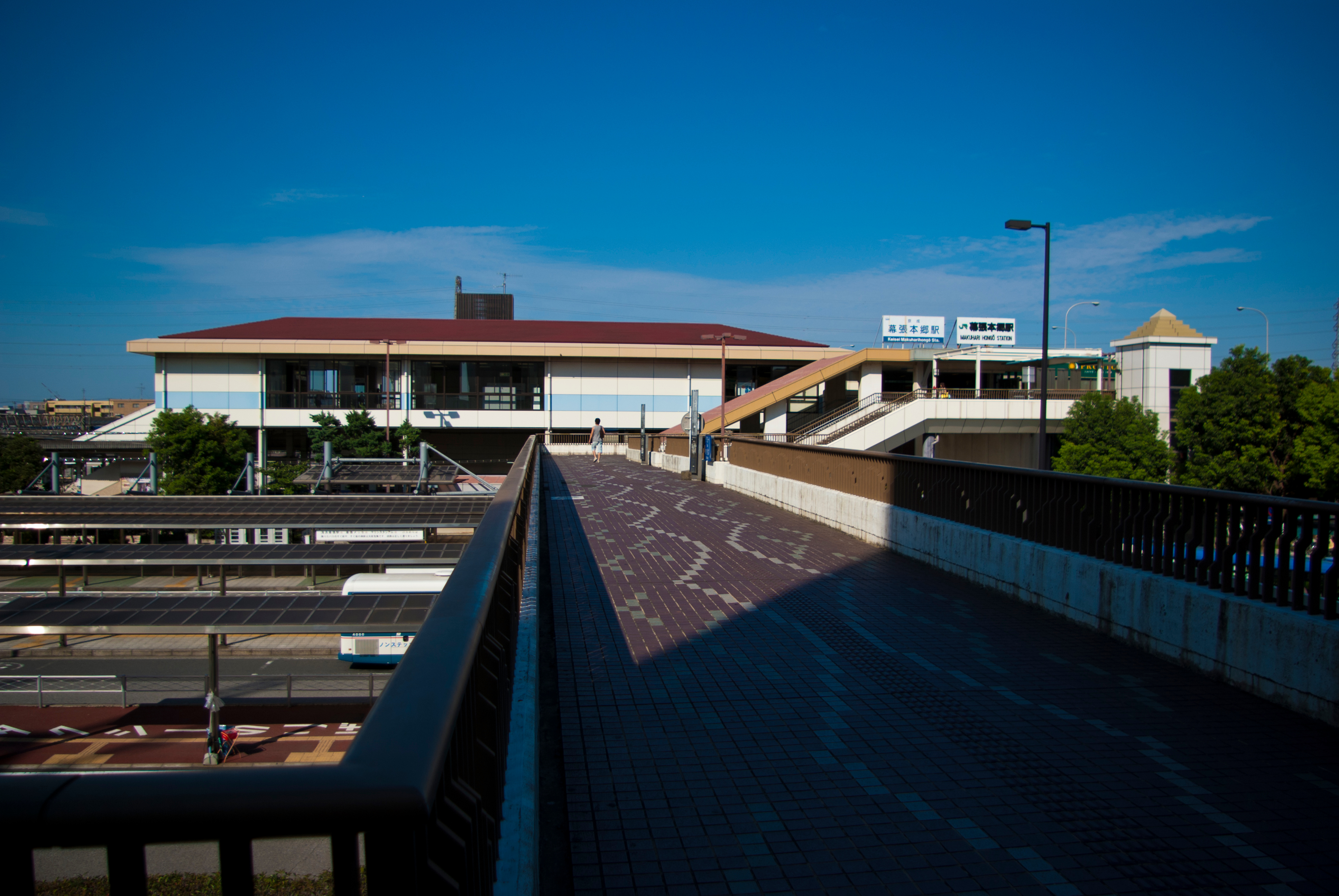
- Makuharihongō Station

- Location within Chiba Prefecture
- Coordinates: 35.6724°N 140.0418°E
- Country: Japan
- Prefecture: Chiba Prefecture
- City: Chiba City
- Ward: Hanamigawa Ward

Area
  - Total: 1.5765 km^{2} (0.6087 sq mi)

Population (January 2018)
  - Total: 21,295
  - Density: 13,508/km^{2} (34,985/sq mi)
- Time zone: UTC+9 (Japan Standard Time)
- Postal code: 262-0033
- Area code: 043
- Vehicle registration: Chiba

Makuharihongo (幕張本郷, Makuharihongō) is a district of Hanamigawa Ward, Chiba City, Chiba Prefecture, Japan, consisting of 1-chōme to 7-chōme.

== History ==
The newer Japanese addressing system (住居表示, Jūkyo-hyōji) was adopted in a part of Makuharicho on 1 March 1982 and on 1 January 1985, which was respectively renamed Makuharihongo 4-chōme to 7-chōme and 1-chōme to 3-chōme.

Current	Adoption date	Former
Makuharihongo 1-chōme	1 January 1985	part of Makuharicho 1-chōme
Makuharihongo 2-chōme	1 January 1985	part of Makuharicho 1-chōme
Makuharihongo 3-chōme	1 January 1985	part of Makuharicho 1-chōme and 2-chōme
Makuharihongo 4-chōme	1 March 1982	part of Makuharicho 1-chōme and 2-chōme
Makuharihongo 5-chōme	1 March 1982	part of Makuharicho 1-chōme and 2-chōme
Makuharihongo 6-chōme	1 March 1982	part of Makuharicho 1-chōme
Makuharihongo 7-chōme	1 March 1982	part of Makuharicho 1-chōme and 2-chōme

== Geography ==
The district is located on the western part of Hanamigawa Ward. It borders Makuharicho to the east, Makuhari-nishi to the south, Saginuma and Saginumadai to the west, Hanasaki and Yashiki to the north.

== Demographics ==
The number of households and population as of January 2018 are shown below.

Chōme	Households	Population	Density (/km^{2})
1-chōme	1,516	2,943	11,730
2-chōme	2,301	4,298	14,790
3-chōme	1,764	3,850	18,810
4-chōme	503	1,086	7,066
5-chōme	1,217	2,399	11,260
6-chōme	1,073	2,053	10,100
7-chōme	2,061	4,666	17,940
Total	10,435	21,295	13,508

== Transportation ==
- Keiyo Road Makuhari IC

=== Railroads ===
- JR East – Chūō-Sōbu Line
  - Makuharihongō
- Keisei Electric Railway – Keisei Chiba Line
  - Keisei Makuharihongō

=== Buses ===
- Keisei Bus
  - Makuharihongō Station - Makuharihongō 5-chōme - Makuharihongō 7-chōme

== Education ==
- Chiba Municipal Nishinoya Elementary School (1-chōme to 3-chōme)
- Chiba Municipal Uenodai Elementary School (4-chōme to 7-chōme)
- Chiba Municipal Makuharihongo Junior High School

== Historical sites ==
- Teppotsuka kofun (鉄砲塚古墳)
- Higashi-Teppotsuka kofun (東鉄砲塚古墳)
- Higashi-Teppotsuka kofun group (東鉄砲塚古墳群)
- Uenodai site (上ノ台遺跡)
- Miyanodai site (宮ノ台遺跡)

== See also ==
- Makuhari
