= Makuharihongō Station =

Railway station in Chiba, Japan

Coordinates: 35.6728°N 140.0424°E

Makuharihongō Station Keisei Makuharihongō Station 幕張本郷駅 京成幕張本郷駅
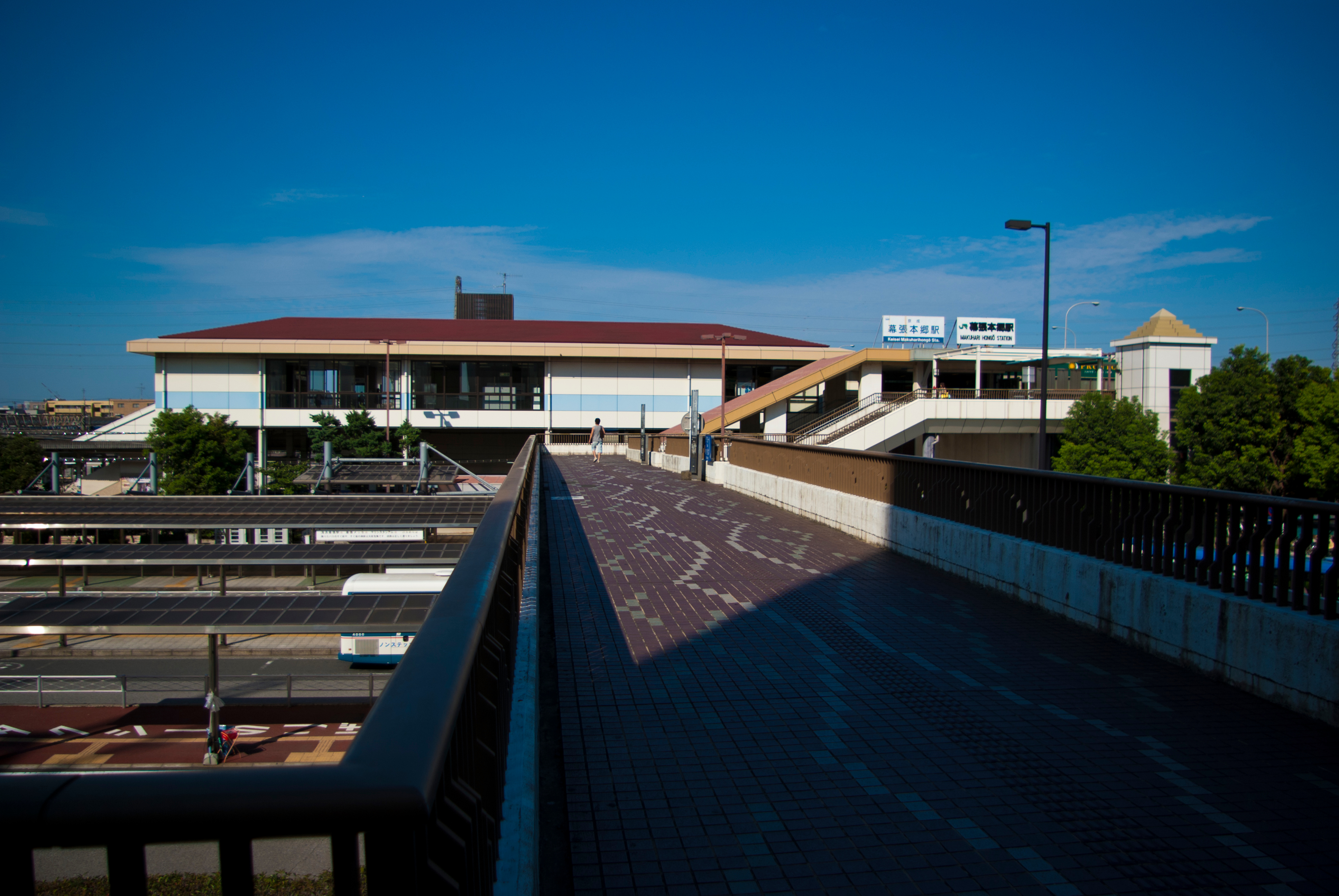
- South entrance in 16 August 2009

General information
- Location: Makuharihongo, Hanamigawa Ward, Chiba City, Chiba Prefecture; Japan
- Operator: JR East; Keisei Electric Railway
- Lines: ■ Sobu Main Line; Keisei Chiba Line
Location
- Location within Chiba Prefecture

Makuharihongō Station (幕張本郷駅, Makuharihongō-eki) is a railway station in Makuharihongo, Hanamigawa Ward, Chiba City, Chiba Prefecture, Japan, operated by East Japan Railway Company (JR East) and the private railway operator Keisei Electric Railway. The Keisei section of the station is officially named Keisei Makuharihongō Station (京成幕張本郷駅, Keisei Makuharihongō-eki).

== Lines ==
- JR East - Makuharihongō Station
  - Sōbu Main Line (Chūō-Sōbu Line local service)
- Keisei - Keisei Makuharihongō Station
  - Chiba Line

== Station layout ==
Makuharihongō Station consists of two separate sections. The northern section is operated by JR East, and the southern is operated by Keisei Electric Railway. The station building is elevated and located above the platforms, connected to the Teppozuka Overbridge.

=== JR East ===
JB34 Makuharihongō Station 幕張本郷駅
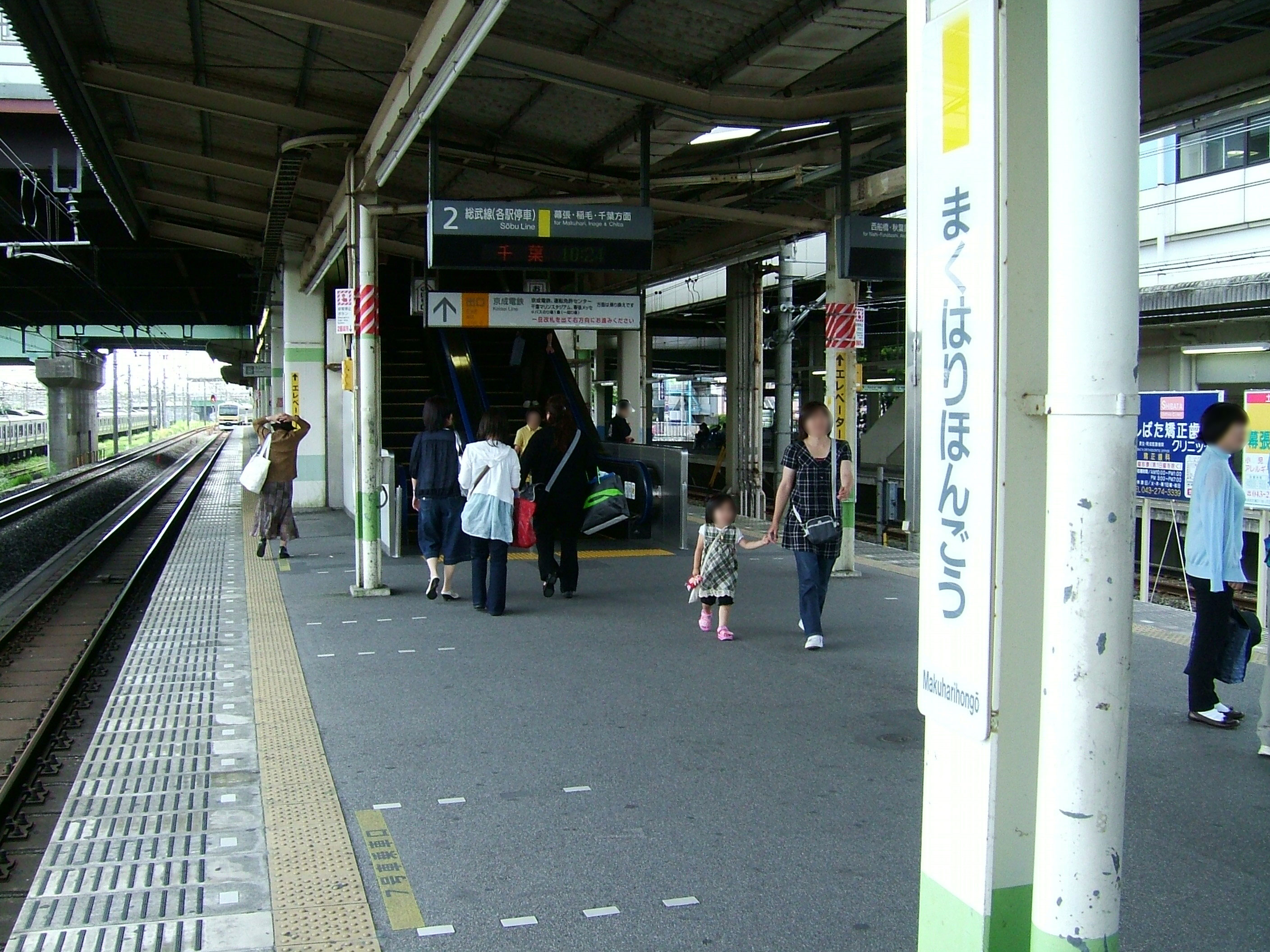
- The JR East platforms

General information
- Location: 1-1-1 Makuharihongo, Hanamigawa Ward, Chiba City, Chiba Prefecture; Japan
- Operator: JR East
- Line: Chūō-Sōbu Line
- Distance: 29.6 km from Tokyo
- Platforms: 1 island platform
- Tracks: 2

Other information
- Station code: JB34
- Website: www.jreast.co.jp/estation/station/info.aspx?StationCd=1424

History
- Opened: 1 October 1981

Passengers
- FY2018: 29,796 daily

Services
Preceding station	JR East	Following station
Tsudanuma JB33 towards Mitaka	Chūō–Sōbu Line	Makuhari JB35 towards Chiba
Location

The JR East station consists of a single island platform serving two tracks. The station has reserved seat ticket machines.

==== Platforms ====
1	Chūō-Sōbu Line	for Tsudanuma, Nishi-Funabashi and Akihabara
2	Chūō-Sōbu Line	for Chiba

=== Keisei ===
KS52 Keisei Makuharihongō Station 京成幕張本郷駅
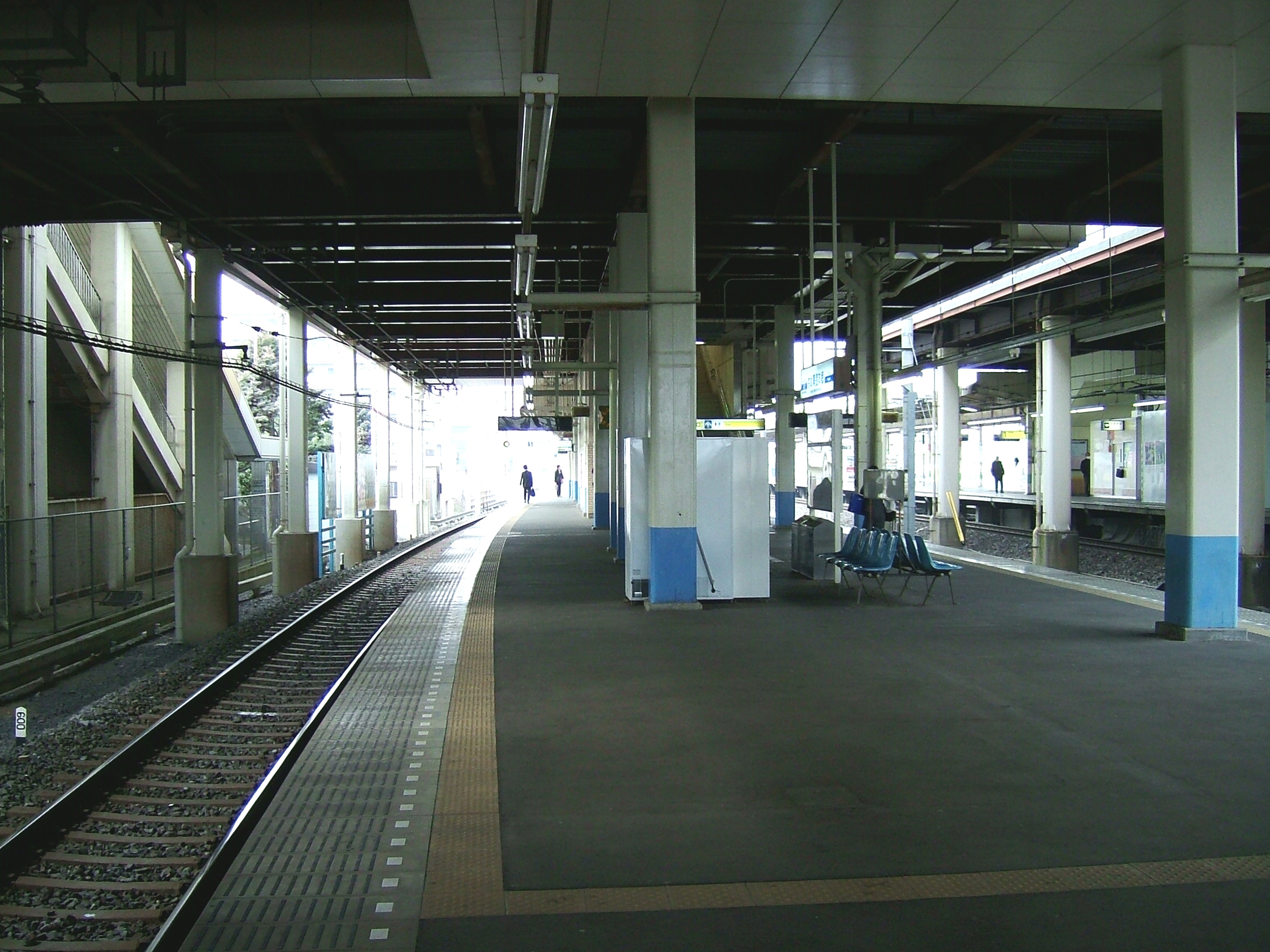

General information
- Location: 1-1-3 Makuharihongo, Hanamigawa Ward, Chiba City, Chiba Prefecture; Japan
- System: Keisei station
- Operator: Keisei Electric Railway
- Line: Keisei Chiba Line
- Distance: 2.1 km from Keisei Tsudanuma
- Platforms: 1 island platform
- Tracks: 2

Other information
- Station code: KS52

History
- Opened: 7 August 1991

Passengers
- FY2018: 8,225 daily

Services
Preceding station	Keisei	Following station
Keisei Tsudanuma KS26 Terminus	Chiba Line	Keisei Makuhari KS53 towards Chiba-Chūō
Location

The Keisei section of the station consists of a single island platform serving two tracks.

==== Platforms ====
1	Keisei Chiba Line	for Keisei Tsudanuma and Keisei Ueno; Keisei Matsudo Line for Matsudo
2	Keisei Chiba Line	for Keisei Chiba and Chiharadai

== History ==
The JR East station opened on October 1, 1981. The Keisei section opened on August 7, 1991.

Station numbering was introduced to all Keisei Line stations on 17 July 2010; Keisei Makuharihongō Station was assigned station number KS52.

== Passenger statistics ==
In fiscal 2018, the JR East station was used by an average of 29,796 passengers daily (boarding passengers only).

Fiscal year	Daily average (JR)
2000	27,117
2001	26,891
2002	26,333
2003	25,682
2004	25,657
2005	25,498
2006	25,815
2007	26,093
2008	26,084
2009	25,821
2010	25,985
2011	25,933
2012	25,873
2013	26,981
2014	27,329
2015	27,655
2016	28,297
2017	29,017
2018	29,796

In fiscal 2018, the Keisei station was used by an average of 8,225 passengers daily (boarding passengers only).

== Surrounding area ==
- JR East Makuhari Depot
- Keiyō Road Makuhari Interchange
- Ōnomatsu stable
- Kaihimmakuhari Station — A 14-minute bus ride from Makuharihongō Station.
- Makuhari Messe — A three-minute walk from the NTT bus stop, which is a nine-minute bus ride from Makuharihongō Station.

== Connecting bus services ==
Keisei Bus and Chiba Seaside Bus operate local bus services from the following Makuharihongō Station bus stops.

Stop No.	Japanese	Reading	For	Via	Operator
0, 1	幕01	Makuharihongō 01	Drivers License Center, Kaihimmakuhari Station, Makuhari Messe, ZOZO Marine Stadium, Medical Center	Drivers License Center	Keisei Bus
0, 1	幕01急行	Makuharihongō 01 Express	Kaihimmakuhari Station (Note: runs non-stop to Fujitsu)		Keisei Bus
0, 1	幕03	Makuharihongō 03	Kaihimmakuhari Station	High-tech Street	Keisei Bus
0, 1	幕03急行	Makuharihongō 03 Express	Techno Garden (Note: runs non-stop to Sharp・SII)	High-tech Street	Keisei Bus
0, 1	幕04	Makuharihongō 04	Wakaba 3-chōme	High-tech Street	Keisei Bus
4	津61	Tsudanuma 61	Tsudanuma Station		Keisei Bus
4	津62	Tsudanuma 62	Tsudanuma Station	Keisei Ōkubo Station Minamiguchi (South Entrance)	Keisei Bus
4	幕66	Makuharihongō 66	Keisei Ōkubo Station Minamiguchi		Keisei Bus
5	イオン36	Aeon Mall 36	Makuharitoyosuna Station	Aeon Mall Makuhari Shintoshin Aeon Style Entrance	Keisei Bus
6	幕11	Makuharihongō 11	Shin-Narashino Station		Keisei Bus
6	幕21	Makuharihongō 21	Gakuen Loop Line		Keisei Bus
6	幕22	Makuharihongō 22	Hamada Ryokuchi (Hamada Park), Kaihimmakuhari Station	Columbus City	Keisei Bus
6	幕23	Makuharihongō 23	KUIS	Columbus City	Keisei Bus
8			JR Makuhari Station	Makuhari 2-chōme	Chiba Seaside Bus

== See also ==
- List of railway stations in Japan
