= Makuhari Station =

Railway station in Chiba, Japan

JB35 Makuhari Station 幕張駅
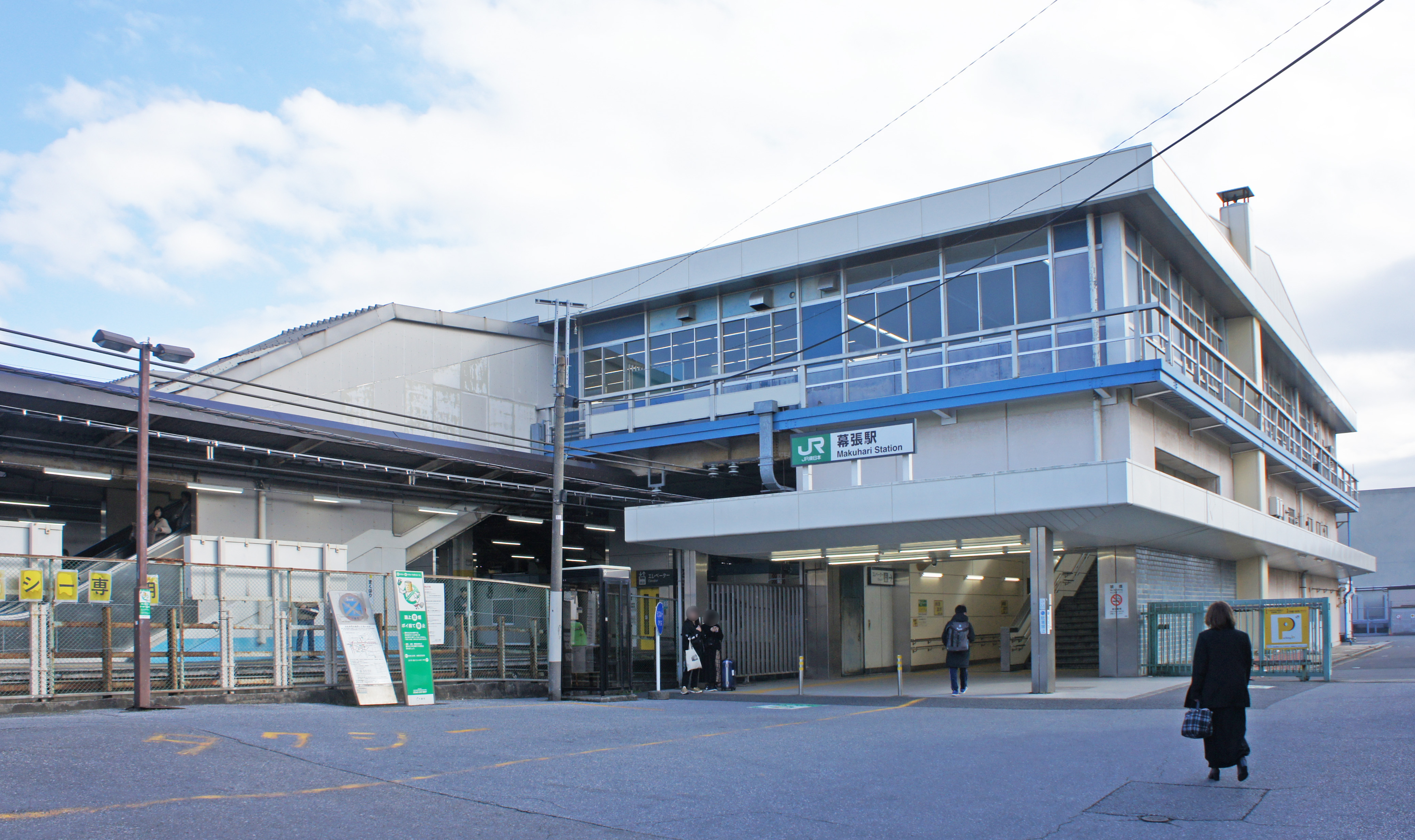
- The south side of the station, December 2019

General information
- Location: 5-121 Makuharicho, Hanamigawa-ku, Chiba-shi, Chiba-ken 262-0032; Japan
- Coordinates: 35.6594°N 140.0577°E
- Operator: JR East
- Line: Chūō-Sōbu Line (the official line name: Sōbu Main Line)
- Distance: 31.6 km from Tokyo
- Platforms: 2 island platforms
- Tracks: 3

Other information
- Station code: JB35
- Website: www.jreast.co.jp/estation/station/info.aspx?StationCd=1423

History
- Opened: 9 December 1894

Passengers
- FY2019: 15,944 daily

Services
Preceding station	JR East	Following station
Makuharihongō JB34 towards Mitaka	Chūō–Sōbu Line	Shin-Kemigawa JB36 towards Chiba
Location
- Location within Chiba Prefecture Location within Japan

Makuhari Station (幕張駅, Makuhari-eki) is a passenger railway station located in Makuharicho, Hanamigawa-ku, Chiba, Japan, operated by East Japan Railway Company (JR East).

== Lines ==
Makuhari Station is served by the Chūō-Sōbu Line (local service) and is located 7.6 kilometers from Chiba Station and 31.6 kilometers from the starting point of the line at Tokyo Station.

== Station layout ==
The station consists of an island platform serving two tracks with an elevated station building located above the platform and tracks. The station is staffed. Tracks for non-stop Sōbu Line (Rapid) services are situated on the north side of the platforms.

=== Platforms ===
1-2	Chūō-Sōbu Line	for Tsudanuma, Akihabara, Shinjuku, and Mitaka
3-4	Chūō-Sōbu Line	for Inage and Chiba

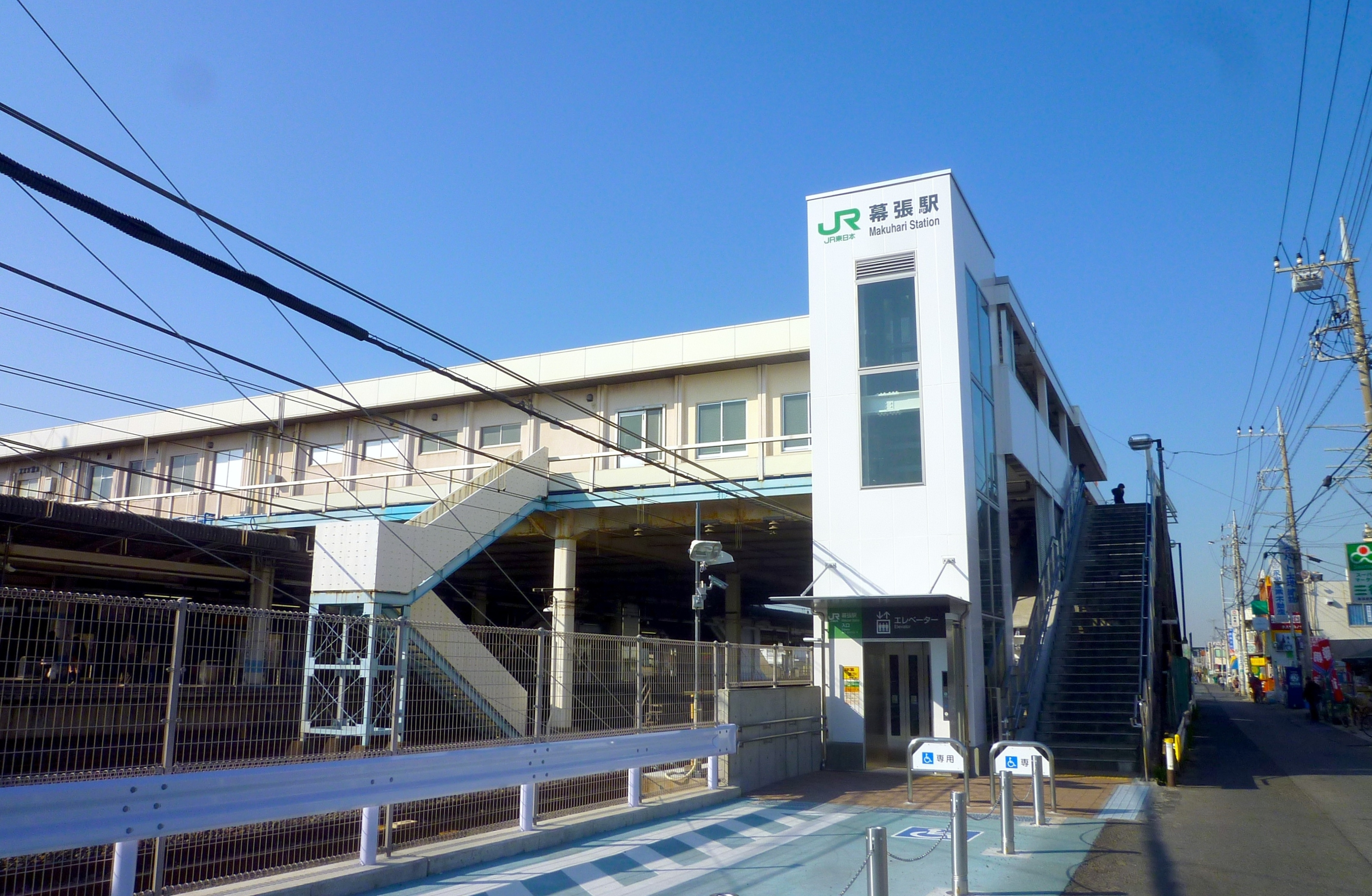
The north entrance in December 2011

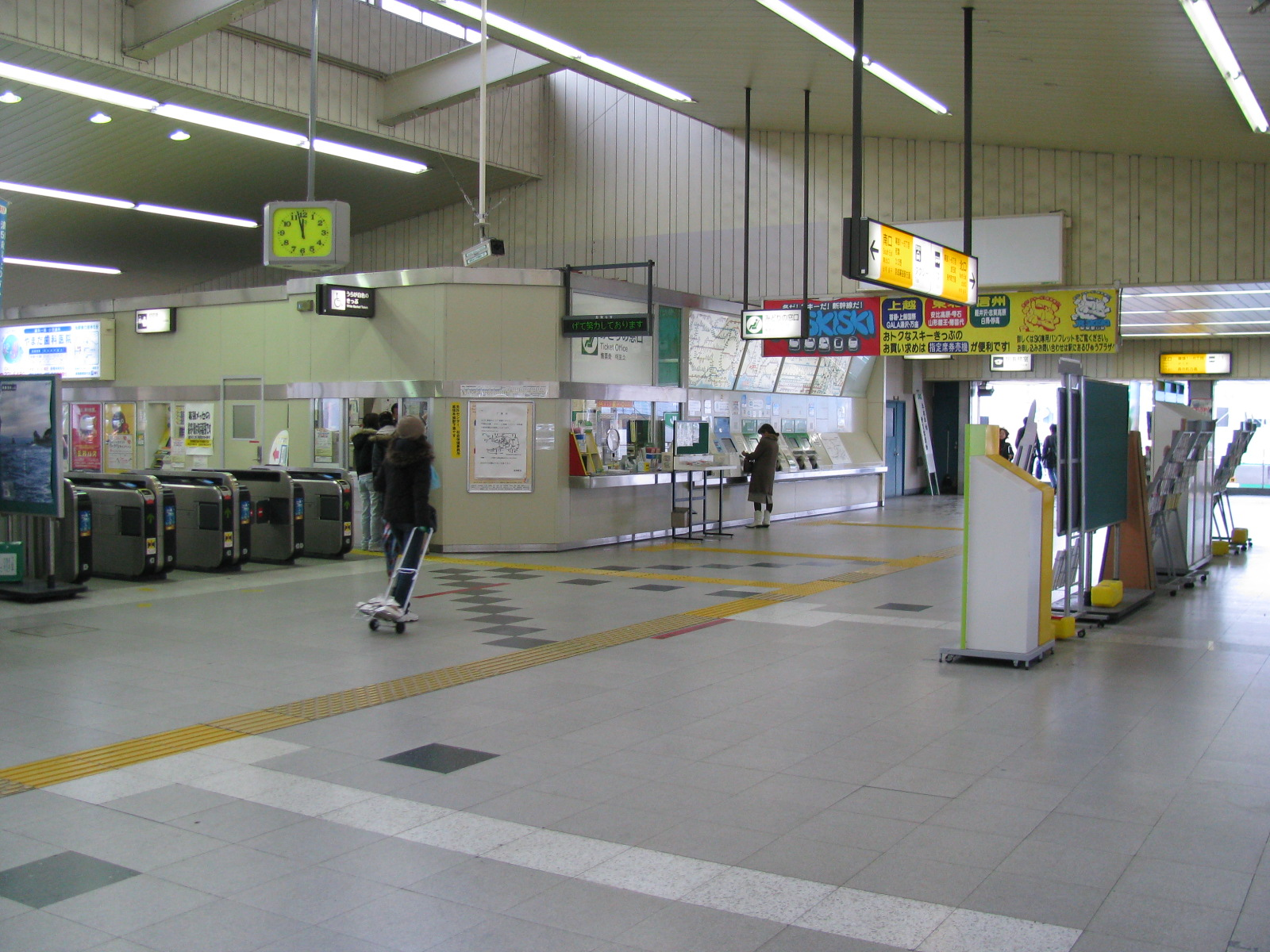
The ticket barriers, December 2007

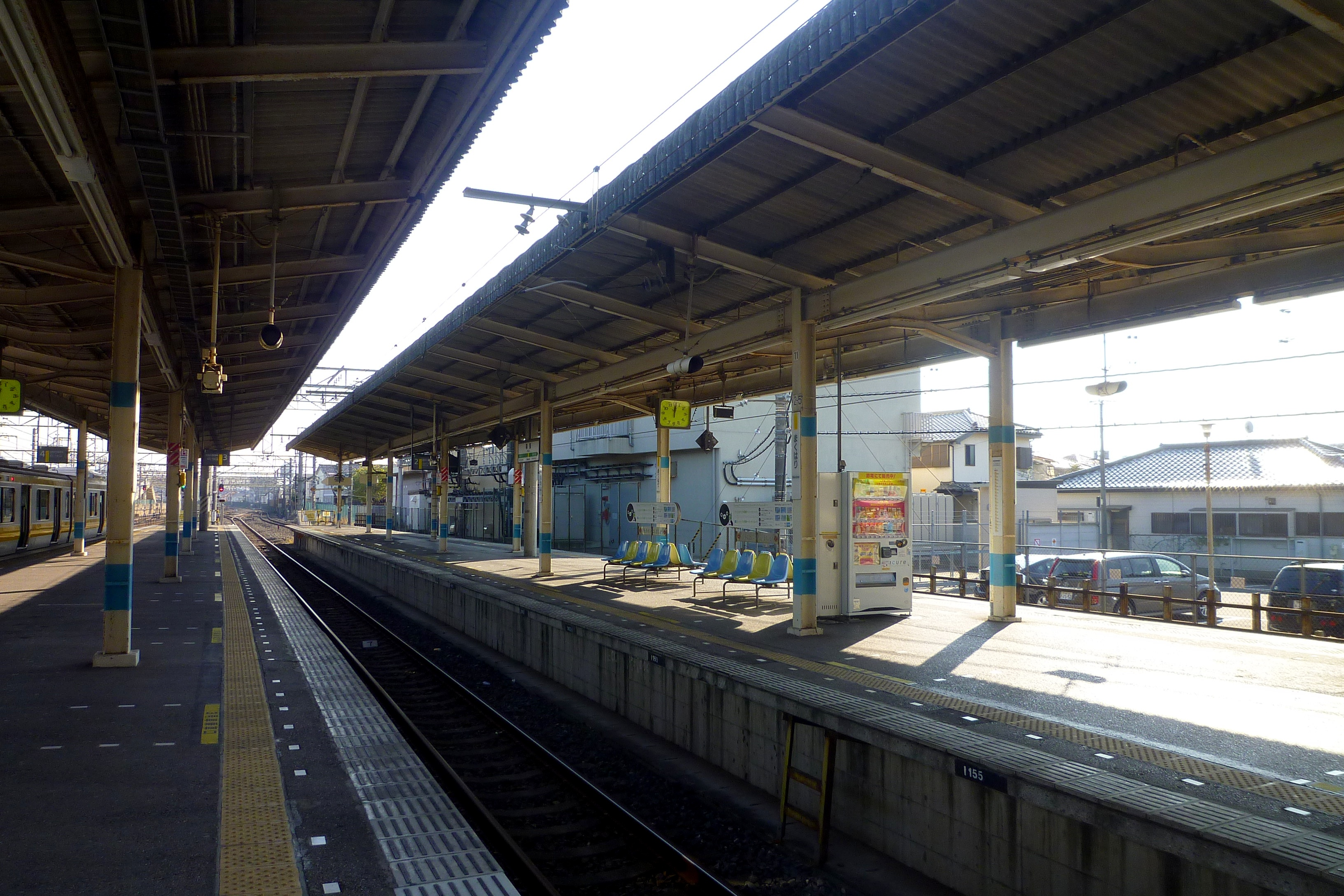
The platforms, December 2011

== History ==
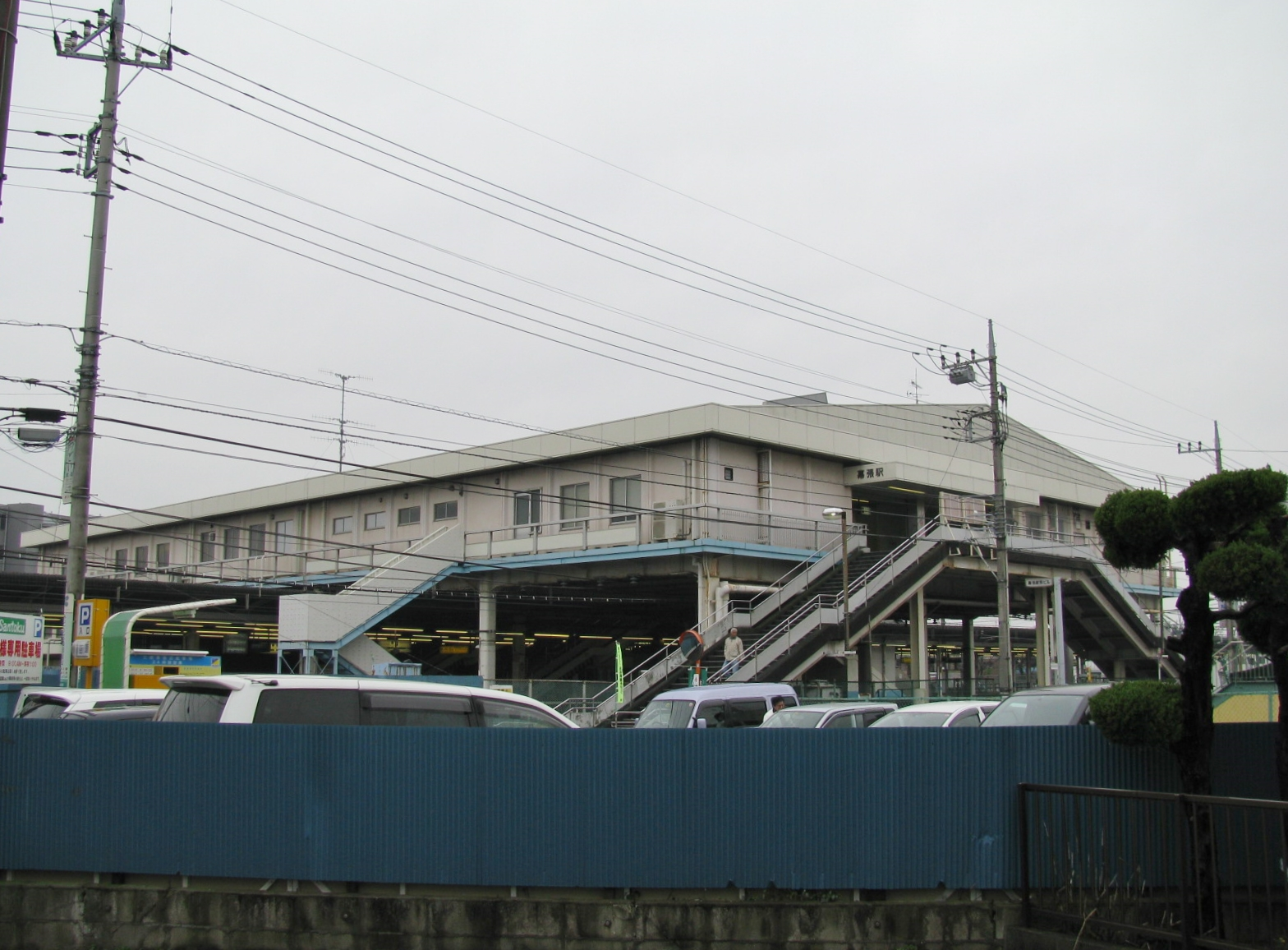
The north side in December 2007, before the addition of a passenger lift

The station opened on 9 December 1894. With the privatization of Japanese National Railways (JNR) on 1 April 1987, the station came under the control of JR East.

== Passenger statistics ==
In fiscal 2019, the station was used by an average of 15,944 passengers daily (boarding passengers only).

== Surrounding area ==
- Keisei Makuhari Station (on the Keisei Chiba Line)
- JR East Makuhari Depot

== See also ==
- List of railway stations in Japan
