= Hanami River =

Coordinates: 35°38′25″N 140°3′47″E

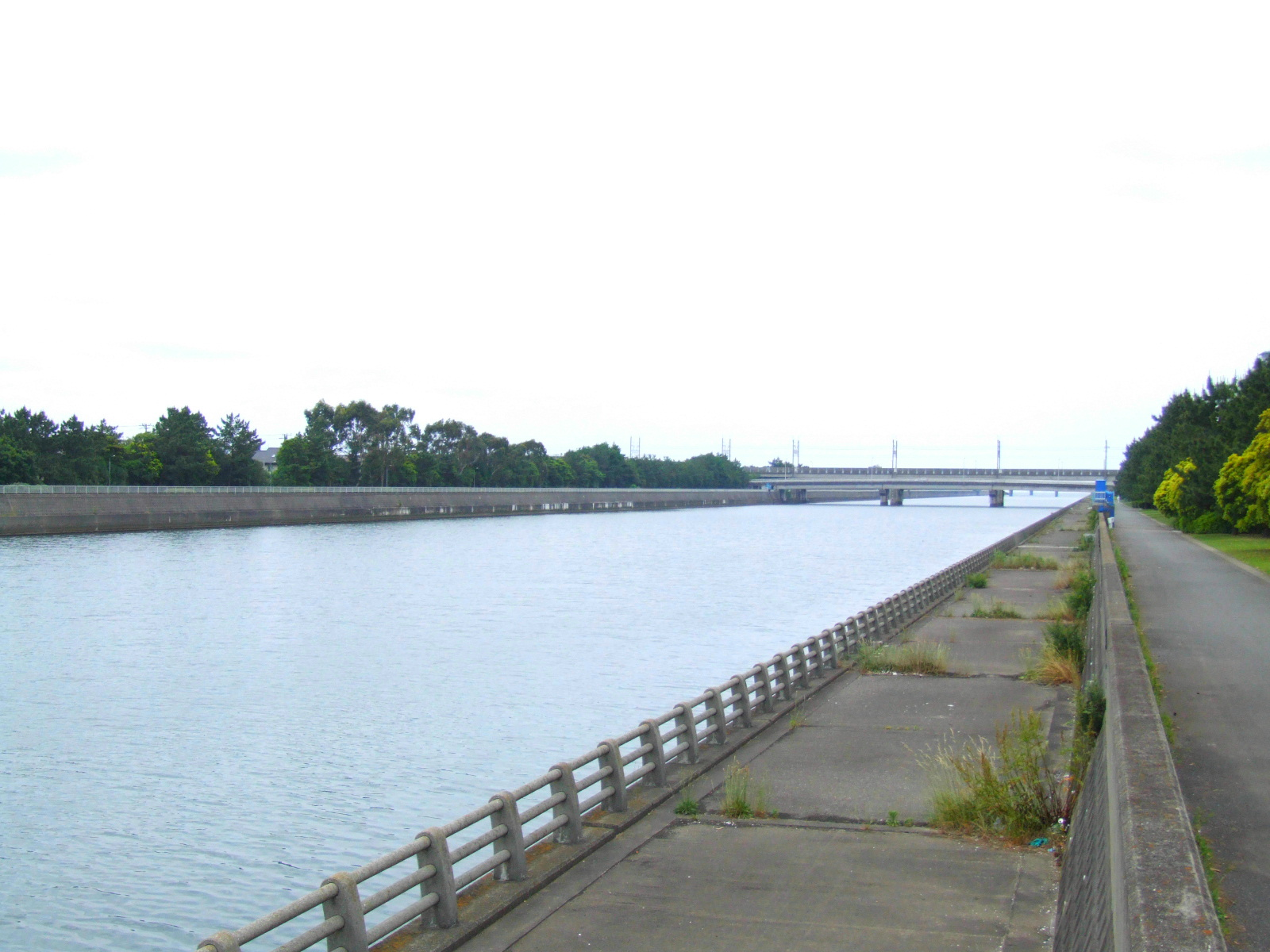
- Hanamigawa Ward, Chiba, Chiba Prefecture, Japan

- Native name: 花見川 (Japanese)

Location
- Country: Japan

Physical characteristics
- Source
  - location: Yachiyo, Chiba Prefecture
- Mouth
  - location: Tokyo Bay, City of Chiba
  - elevation: 0 m (0 ft)
- Length: 18.9 km (11.7 mi)
- Basin size: 94.5 km^{2} (36.5 sq mi)

The Hanami River (花見川, Hanami-gawa) is a river in Yachiyo and Chiba, Chiba Prefecture, Japan. The river is 18.9 kilometers (11.7 mi) in length and has a drainage area of 94.5 square kilometers (36.5 sq mi). The Hanami is one part of the Inba Discharge Channel (印旛放水路, Inba Hōsuiro). The upper part of the drainage facility is designated as the Shin River. The lower part, the Hanami, ranges from the Ōwada Drainage Pump Station in Yachiyo City, and drains into Tokyo Bay in the Mihama Ward of Chiba City. The lower part of the river where the Hanami empties into Tokyo Bay is known as the Kemi River (検見川, Kemi-gawa). Numerous sluices have been built on the Hanami to protect the surrounding area from damage due to high tides and typhoons.

== History ==
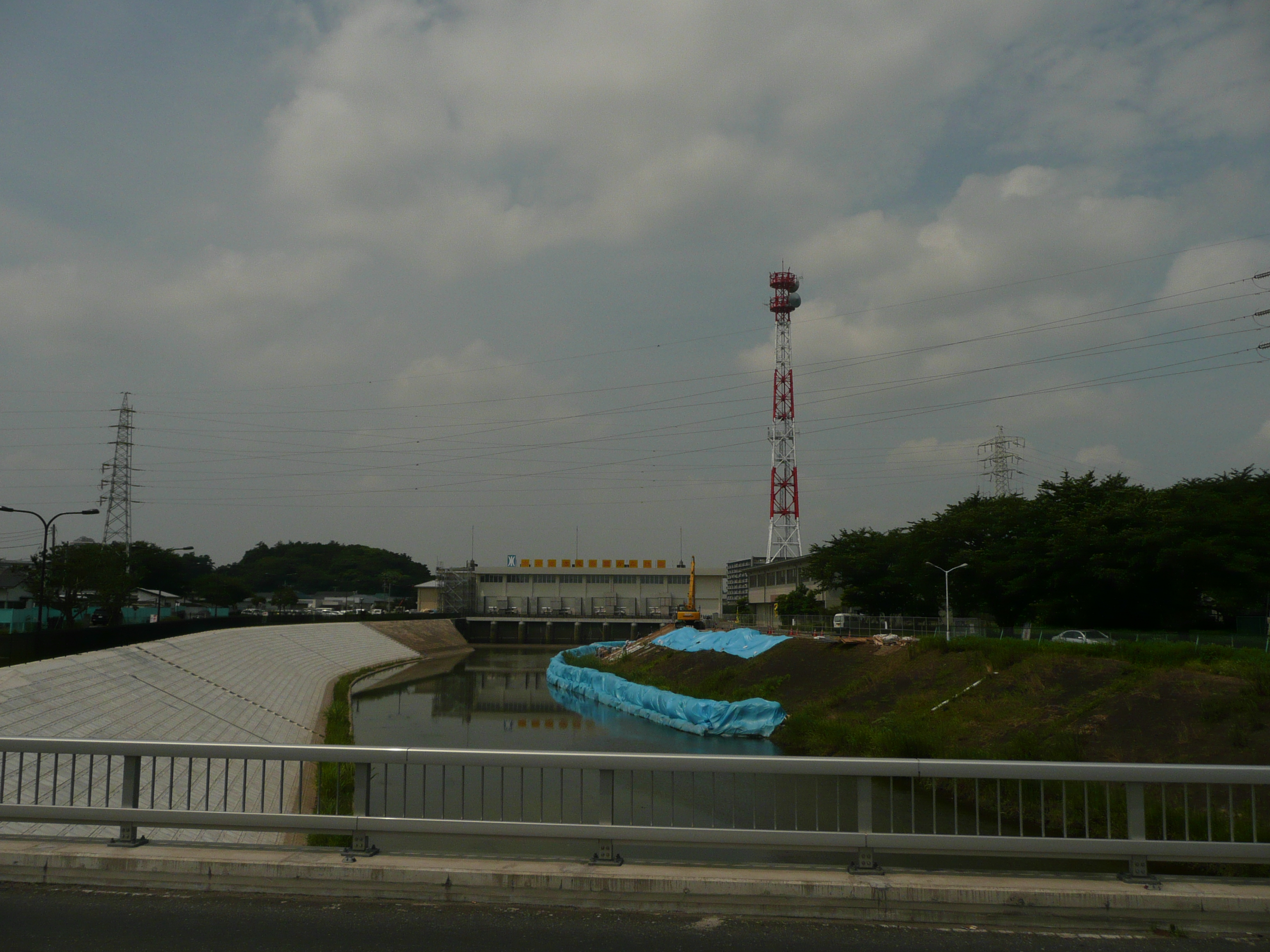
Ōwada Drainage Pump Station viewed from Hanami River

The Hanami River was developed as a canal in the 18th century to connect the Tone River to Tokyo Bay, control flooding in the Lake Inba marsh area, and facilitate the construction of new rice paddy areas in Shimōsa Province. The first attempt at building a canal was in 1724, but funds provided by the Tokugawa shogunate to the chief of Hirato Village, now part of Yachiyo, dried up and the project was abandoned. In 1844 final work on the canal was completed. Within two years shallow riverboats carried rice and sweet potatoes from the Tone River area to Kemigawa Harbor, and in turn returned fertilizer up the canal to agricultural areas in its upper reaches of the Hanami. Shipping along the Hanami River declined greatly by the end of the Tokugawa period due to the construction of roads along the river. The transport of sweet potatoes for starch production in the Kemigawa area continued, however, until 1952.

== Tributaries ==
- Katta River (3.59 square kilometers (1.39 sq mi))
- Takatsu River

== Recreation ==
A large-scale bicycle path, the Inbanuma Bicycle Path, is under construction to span the entirety of the Inba Discharge Channel. The section of the path along the Hanami River has been designated as the Hanami Cycling Road. It is not yet complete and unpaved portions remain in Kashiwaimachi in Ichikawa and Yokoto in Chiba City.
