= Keisei Makuhari Station =

Railway station in Chiba, Japan

Coordinates: 35.6607°N 140.0557°E

KS53 Keisei Makuhari Station 京成幕張駅
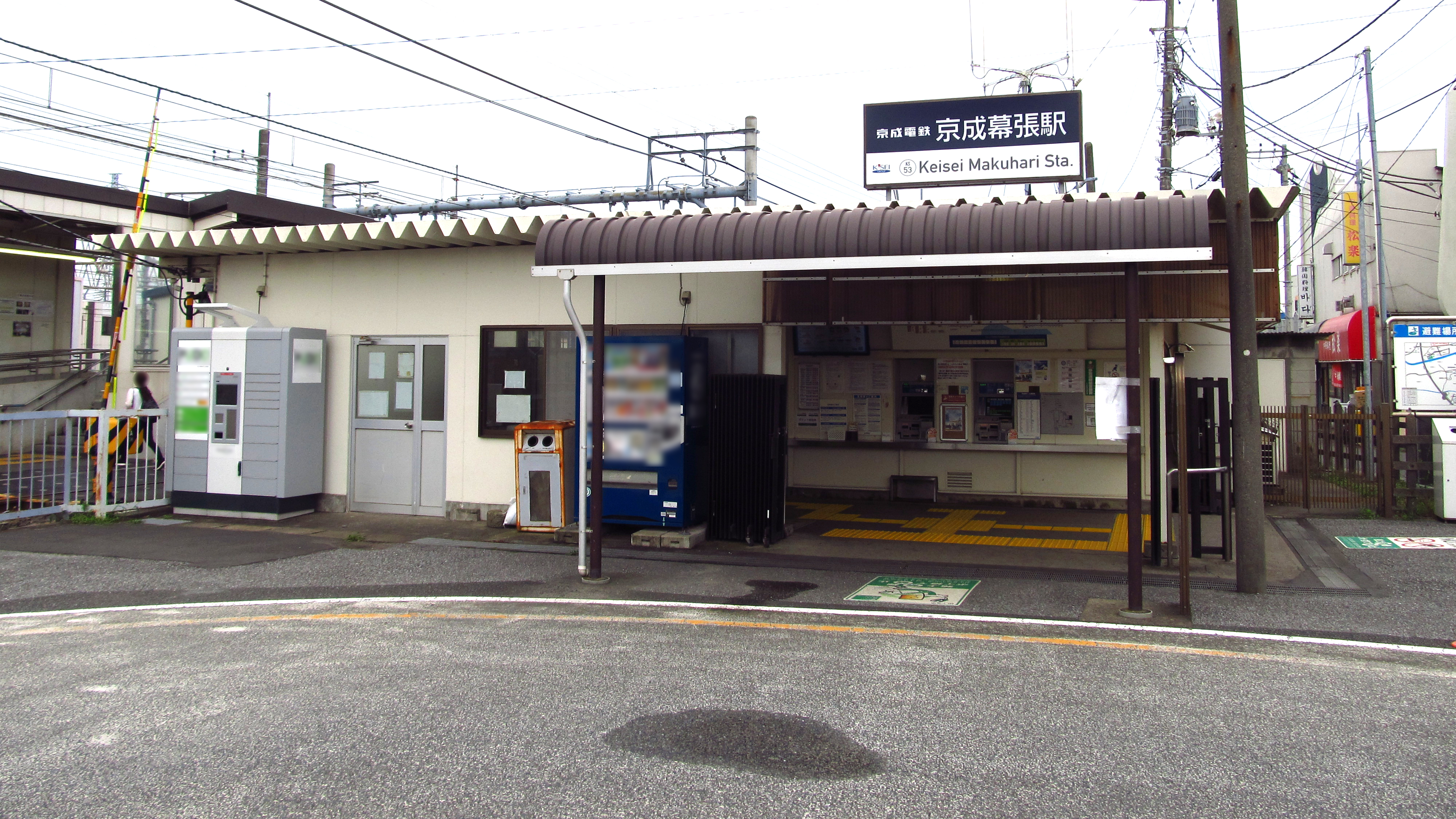
- The station building in July 2020

General information
- Location: 4-601 Makuharicho, Hanamigawa, Chiba, Chiba （千葉県千葉市花見川区幕張町四丁目601番） Japan
- Operator: Keisei Electric Railway
- Line: Keisei Chiba Line

Other information
- Station code: KS53

History
- Opened: 1921

Passengers
- 2009: 7,240 daily

Services
Preceding station	Keisei	Following station
Keisei Makuharihongō KS52 towards Keisei Tsudanuma	Chiba Line	Kemigawa KS54 towards Chiba-Chūō
Location
- Location within Chiba Prefecture

Keisei Makuhari Station (京成幕張駅, Keisei Makuhari-eki) is a railway station operated by the Keisei Electric Railway located in Hanamigawa-ku, Chiba Japan. It is 4.0 kilometers from the terminus of the Keisei Chiba Line at Keisei-Tsudanuma Station.

== History ==
Keisei Makuhari Station was opened on 17 July 1921.

Station numbering was introduced to all Keisei Line stations on 17 July 2010; Keisei Makuhari Station was assigned station number KS53.

== Lines ==
- Keisei Electric Railway
  - Keisei Chiba Line

== Layout ==
Keisei Makuhari Station has a single island platform connected by a level crossing to the station building.

=== Platforms ===
1	Keisei Chiba Line	for Keisei Tsudanuma, Aoto, and Keisei Ueno; Keisei Matsudo Line for Matsudo
2	Keisei Chiba Line	for Keisei Chiba and Chiharadai

== Surrounding area ==
- Makuhari Station ( Chūō-Sōbu Line)

== Connecting bus services ==
Keisei Bus operates local bus services from Keisei Makuhari Station.

Japanese	Reading	For	Via	Operator
海51	Kaihimmakuhari 51	Kaihimmakuhari Station	High-tech street	Keisei Bus
海52	Kaihimmakuhari 52	Kaihimmakuhari Station		Keisei Bus
海53	Kaihimmakuhari 53	ZOZO Marine Stadium		Keisei Bus
