= Hanamigawa-ku =

Hanamigawa 花見川区
- Ward
- Hanamigawa Ward
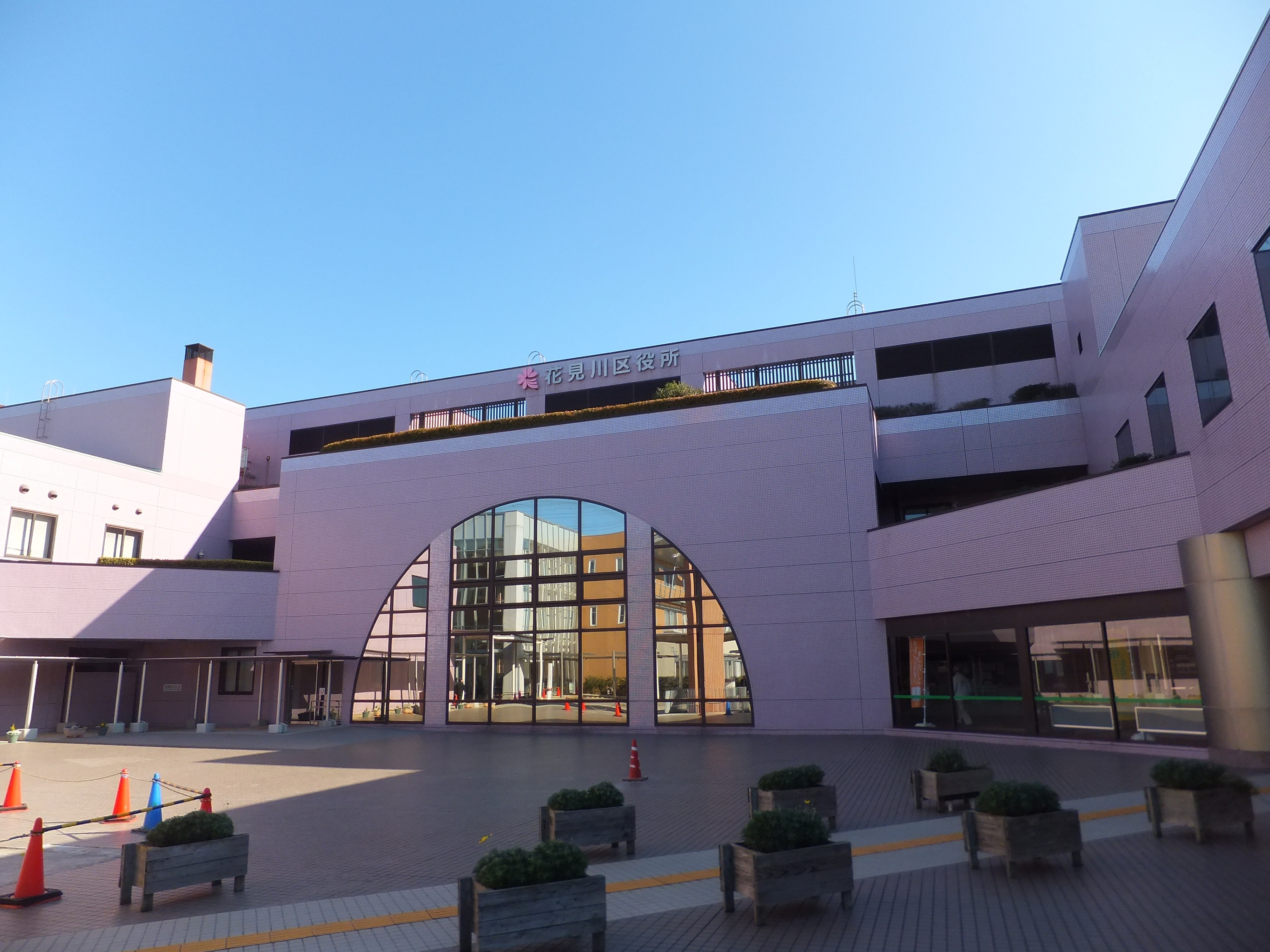
- Hanamigawa Ward Office

- Flag Seal

- Location of Hanamigawa Ward in Chiba

- Coordinates: 35°39′46″N 140°04′09″E
- Country: Japan
- Region: Kantō
- Prefecture: Chiba
- City: Chiba

Area
  - Total: 34.24 km^{2} (13.22 sq mi)

Population (April 2012)
  - Total: 179,770
  - Density: 5,250/km^{2} (13,600/sq mi)
- Time zone: UTC+9 (Japan Standard Time)
- Address: 1-1 Mizuho, Hanamigawa-ku Chiba-shi, Chiba-ken; 262-8733
- Website: Official website of Hanamigawa-ku

Hanamigawa Ward (花見川区, Hanamigawa-ku) is one of the six wards of the city of Chiba in Chiba Prefecture, Japan. As of April 2012, the ward has an estimated population of 179,770 and a population density of 5,250 persons per km^{2}. The total area is 34.24 km^{2}.

== Geography ==
Hanamigawa Ward is located inland in the northernmost part of the city of Chiba. The ward takes its name from the Hanami River, which flows through the ward.

== Places ==
- Amadocho
- Asahigaoka
- Asahigaokacho
- Chigusacho
- Dainichicho
- Hanamigawa
- Hanashimacho
- Hanazono
- Hanazonocho
- Hatamachi
- Kashiwai
- Kashiwaicho
- Kemigawacho
- Kotehashicho
- Kotehashidai
- Makuharicho
- Makuharihongo
- Miharuno
- Minami-Hanazono
- Miyanogidai
- Mizuho
- Nagasakucho
- Nagasakudai
- Naniwacho
- Nishi-Konakadai
- Sakushindai
- Sankakucho
- Satsukigaoka
- Takeishicho
- Uchiyamacho
- Unayacho
- Yokodocho
- Yokododai

== Transportation ==
=== Railroads ===
- JR East – Sōbu Line
  - Makuharihongō - Makuhari - Shin-Kemigawa
- Keisei Electric Railway – Chiba Line
  - Keisei Makuharihongō - Keisei Makuhari - Kemigawa

== Education ==
Municipal elementary and junior high schools are operated by the Chiba City Board of Education (千葉市教育委員会).

Municipal junior high schools:

- Amado (天戸中学校)
- Asahigaoka (朝日ケ丘中学校)
- Hanamigawa (花見川中学校)
- Hanazono (花園中学校)
- Kotehashi (犢橋中学校)
- Kotehashidai (こてはし台中学校)
- Makuhari (幕張中学校)
- Makuhari Hongo (幕張本郷中学校)
- Midorigaoka (緑が丘中学校)
- Satsukigaoka (さつきが丘中学校)

Former junior high schools

- Hamamigawa No. 1 (花見川第一中学校)
- Hamamigawa No. 2 (花見川第二中学校)

Municipal elementary schools:

- Asahigaoka (朝日ケ丘小学校)
- Hanamigawa (花見川小学校)
- Hanamigawa No. 3 (花見川第三小学校)
- Hanashima (花島小学校)
- Hanazono (花園小学校)
- Hata (畑小学校)
- Kashiwai (柏井小学校)
- Kemigawa (検見川小学校)
- Kotehashi (犢橋小学校)
- Kotehashidai (こてはし台小学校)
- Makuhari (幕張小学校)
- Makuhari Higashi (幕張東小学校)
- Makuhari Minami (幕張南小学校)
- Mizuho (瑞穂小学校)
- Nagasaku (長作小学校)
- Nishikonakadai (西小中台小学校)
- Nishinoya (西の谷小学校)
- Sakushin (作新小学校)
- Satsukigaoka Higashi (さつきが丘東小学校)
- Satsukigaoka Nishi (さつきが丘西小学校)
- Uenodai (上の台小学校)
- Yokodo (横戸小学校)

Former elementary schools:

- Hanamigawa No. 1 (花見川第一小学校)
- Hanamigawa No. 2 (花見川第二小学校)
- Hanamigawa No. 4 (花見川第四小学校)
- Hanamigawa No. 5 (花見川第五小学校)

The Chiba Korean Primary and Junior High School, a North Korea-aligned Korean international school, is located in Hamamigawa-ku.

== Noted people from Hanamigawa Ward ==
- Masaki Aiba – singer, actor
- Hitori Gekidan - comedian, actor
- Matsuko Deluxe - TV personality
- Yasuyuki Kataoka - professional baseball player
- Akira Narahashi – professional soccer player
- Akinori Otsuka - professional baseball player
- Fuminori Yokogawa - professional baseball player
- Kotofuji Takaya - sumo wrestler
