= Mimomi =

Mimomi 実籾
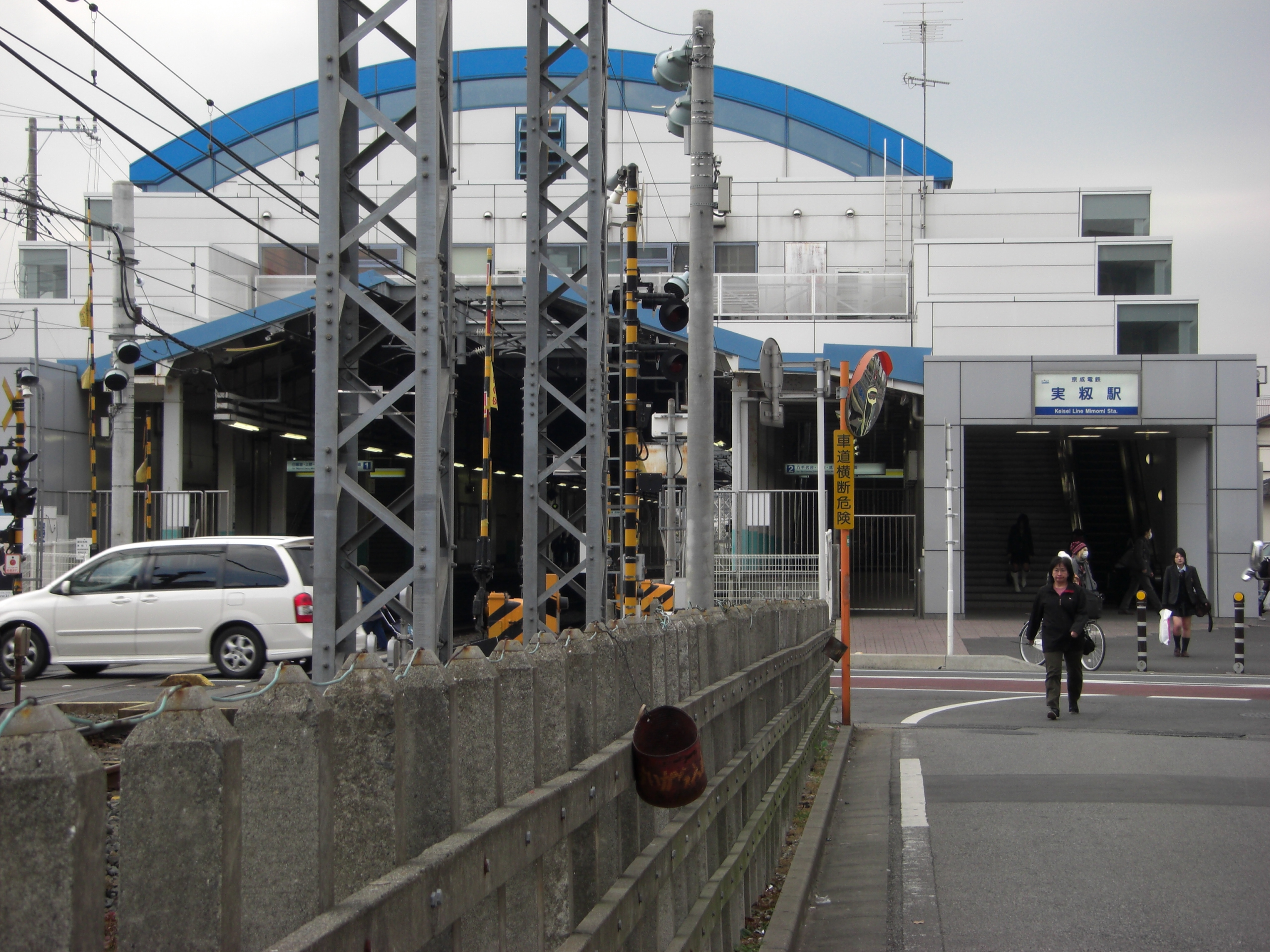
- Mimomi Station

- Location within Chiba Prefecture
- Coordinates: 35.6867°N 140.0695°E
- Country: Japan
- Prefecture: Chiba Prefecture
- City: Narashino City

Area
  - Total: 1.539 km^{2} (0.594 sq mi)

Population (September 2018)
  - Total: 9,871
  - Density: 6,414/km^{2} (16,610/sq mi)
- Time zone: UTC+9 (Japan Standard Time)
- Postal code: Mimomi 1-chōme to 6 chōme: 275-0002; Mimomi Hongo: 275-0003
- Area code: 047
- Vehicle registration: Narashino

Mimomi (実籾) is a district of Narashino City, Chiba Prefecture, Japan, consisting of 1-chōme to 6-chōme and Hongo (本郷, Hongō).

== Geography ==
The district is located on the eastern part of Narashino City.

=== Surrounding districts ===
Narashino City

- Higashi-Narashino
- Yashiki
- Moto-Okubo
- Okubo
- Shin-ei

Funabashi City

- Miyama

Hanamigawa Ward, Chiba City

- Nagasakucho
- Makuharicho

== Demographics ==
The population as of September 2018 is shown below.

Chōme	Population	Density (/km^{2})
1-chōme	1,683	8,053
2-chōme	2,373	6,573
3-chōme	835	3,523
4-chōme	1,827	10,940
5-chōme	1,532	12,350
6-chōme	1,153	9,529
Hongo	468	1,463
Total	9,871	6,414

== Transportation ==
=== Rail service ===
- Keisei Electric Railway - Keisei Main Line
  - KS28 Mimomi Station

=== Bus service ===
- Keisei Bus - Mimomi Line
  - Mimomi Station - Chiba Bank - Mimomi Koban - Higashi-Narashino 2-chōme
- Narashino City Happy Bus - Keisei Ōkubo Station Route
  - Tōbu Hoken-fukushi Center - Mimomi High School - Mimomi Hongo Iriguchi

== Education ==
- Narashino City Mimomi Elementary School
- Narashino City Daini Junior High School
- Chiba Prefecture Mimomi High School
