= Yatsu Station (Chiba) =

Railway station in Narashino, Chiba Prefecture, Japan

KS25 Yatsu Station 谷津駅
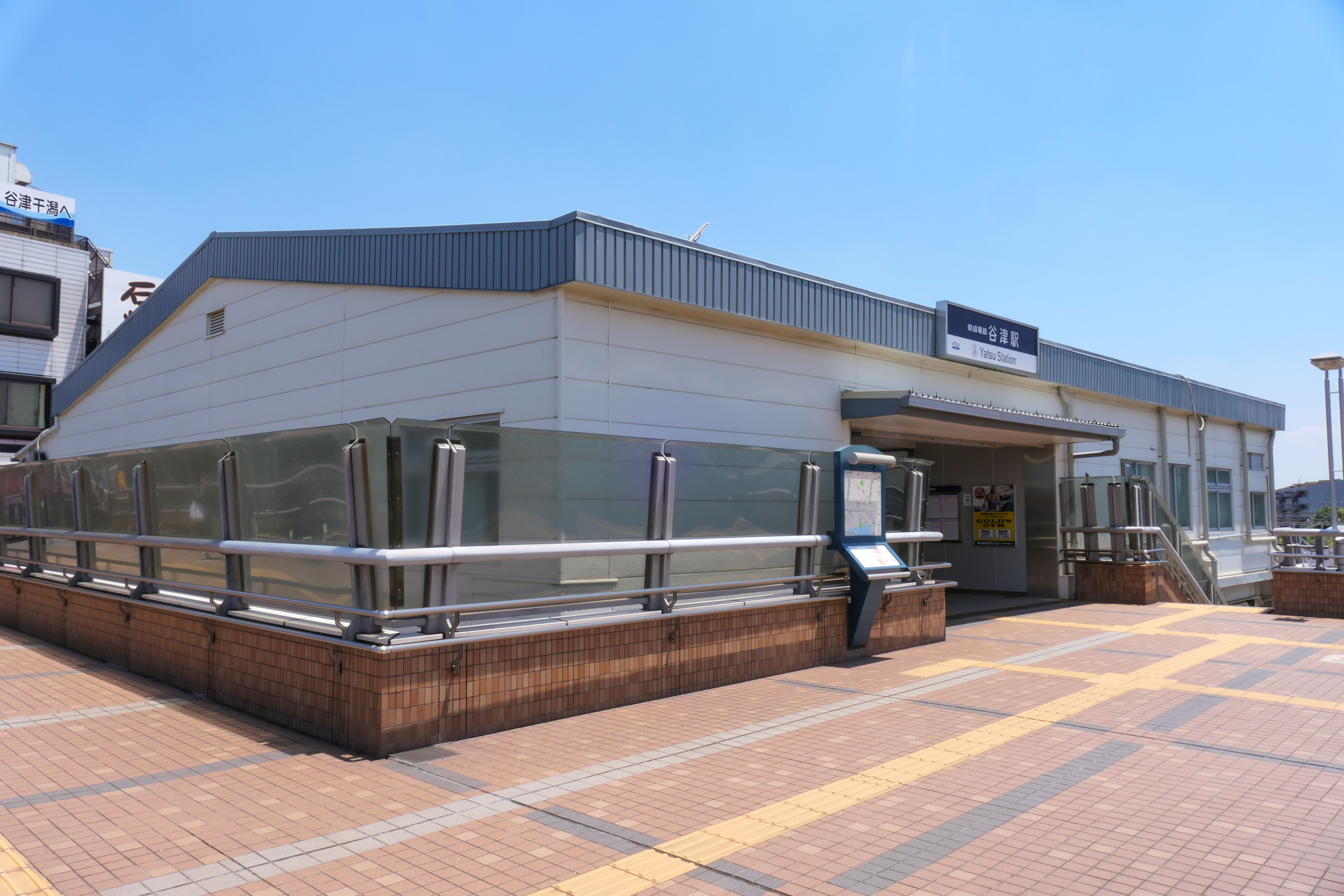
- North exit Yatsu Station, 2021

General information
- Location: 5-4-5 Yatsu, Narashino-shi, Chiba-ken 275-0026; Japan
- Coordinates: 35.6850°N 140.0075°E
- Operator: Keisei Electric Railway
- Line: Keisei Main Line
- Distance: 28.4 km from Keisei-Ueno
- Platforms: 1 island platform

Other information
- Station code: KS25
- Website: Official website

History
- Opened: July 17, 1921
- Former names: Yatsu-Kaigan; Yatsu-Yūen (until 1984)

Passengers
- FY2019: 11,033 daily

Services
Preceding station	Keisei	Following station
Funabashikeibajō KS24 towards Keisei Ueno	Main Line Local	Keisei Tsudanuma KS26 towards Narita Airport Terminal 1
Location
- Location within Chiba Prefecture Location within Japan

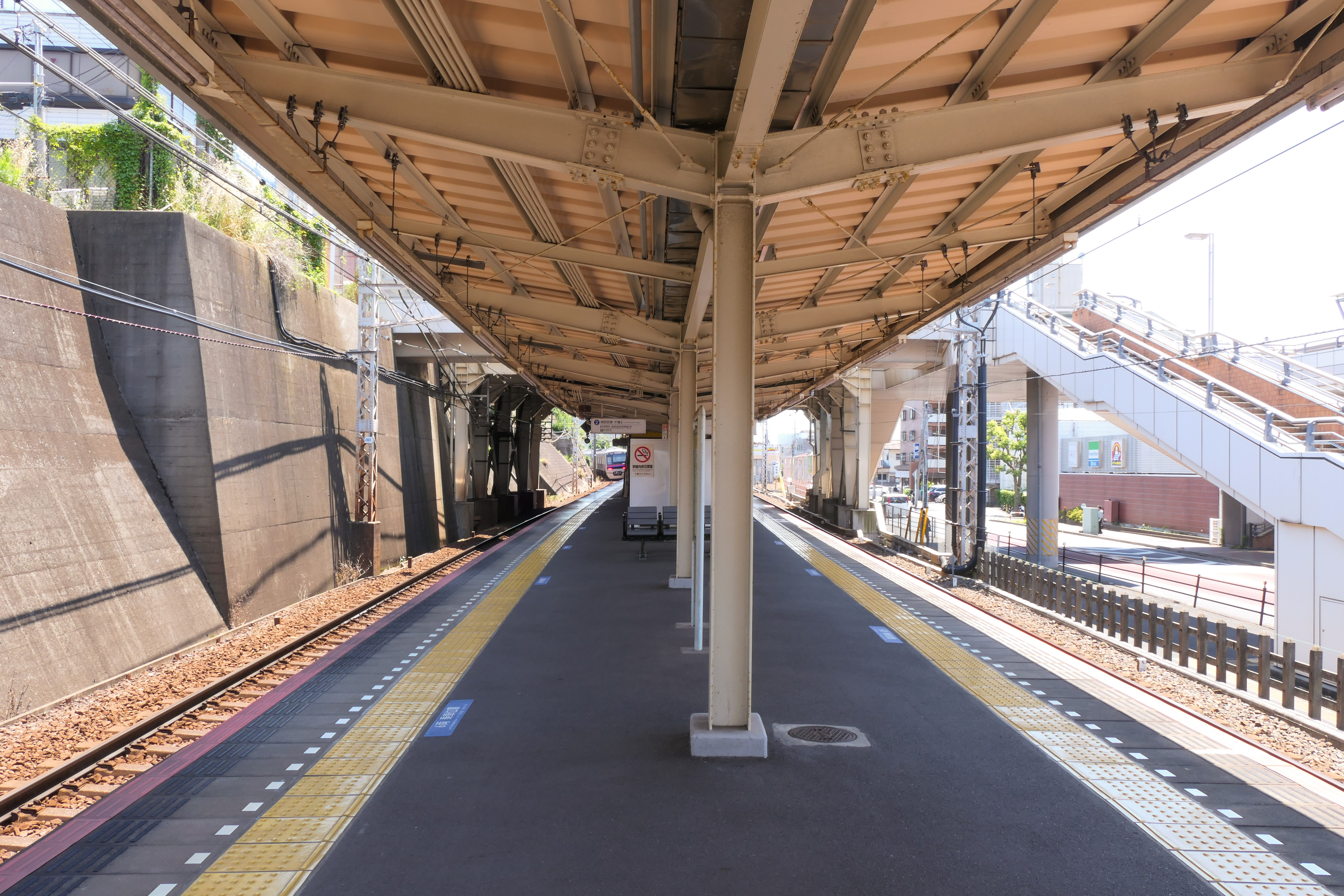
Station platforms, 2021

Yatsu Station (谷津駅, Yatsu-eki) is a passenger railway station located in the city of Narashino, Chiba Prefecture Japan, operated by the private railway company, Keisei Electric Railway.

== Lines ==
Yatsu Station is served by the Keisei Main Line, and is located 28.4 km from the official starting point of the line at Keisei-Ueno Station.

== Station layout ==
Yatsu Station has a single island platform connected by a footbridge to the elevated station building.

=== Platforms ===
1	Keisei Main Line	for Keisei Funabashi, Keisei Takasago, Nippori, and Keisei Ueno
2	Keisei Main Line	for Keisei Tsudanuma, Keisei Chiba, Chiharadai, Keisei Narita, and Narita Airport (Terminal 2·3 and Terminal 1)

== History ==
Yatsu Station was opened on 17 July 1921, as Yatsu Kaigan Station (谷津海岸駅, Yatsu Kaigan-eki). The station was renamed to Yatsu-Yūen Station (谷津遊園駅, Yatsu-Yūen-eki) on 10 April 1936, after a nearby amusement park. The name reverted to Yatsu Kaigain in 1939, as part of the Japanese government's austerity measures in the early stages of World War II, and reverted to Yatsu-Yūen Station on 1 April 1948. Yatsu-Yūen Amusement Park ceased operation on 24 November 1984, and the station was renamed to its current name. From 1985, the station ceased to be served by express trains.

Station numbering was introduced to all Keisei Line stations on 17 July 2010; Yatsu Station was assigned station number KS25.

== Passenger statistics ==
In fiscal 2019, the station was used by an average of 11,033 passengers daily (boarding passengers only).

== Surrounding area ==
- Yatsu Higata Tidal Flat

== See also ==
- List of railway stations in Japan
