= Keisei Ōkubo Station =

Railway station in Narashino, Chiba Prefecture, Japan

KS27 Keisei-Ōkubo Station 京成大久保駅
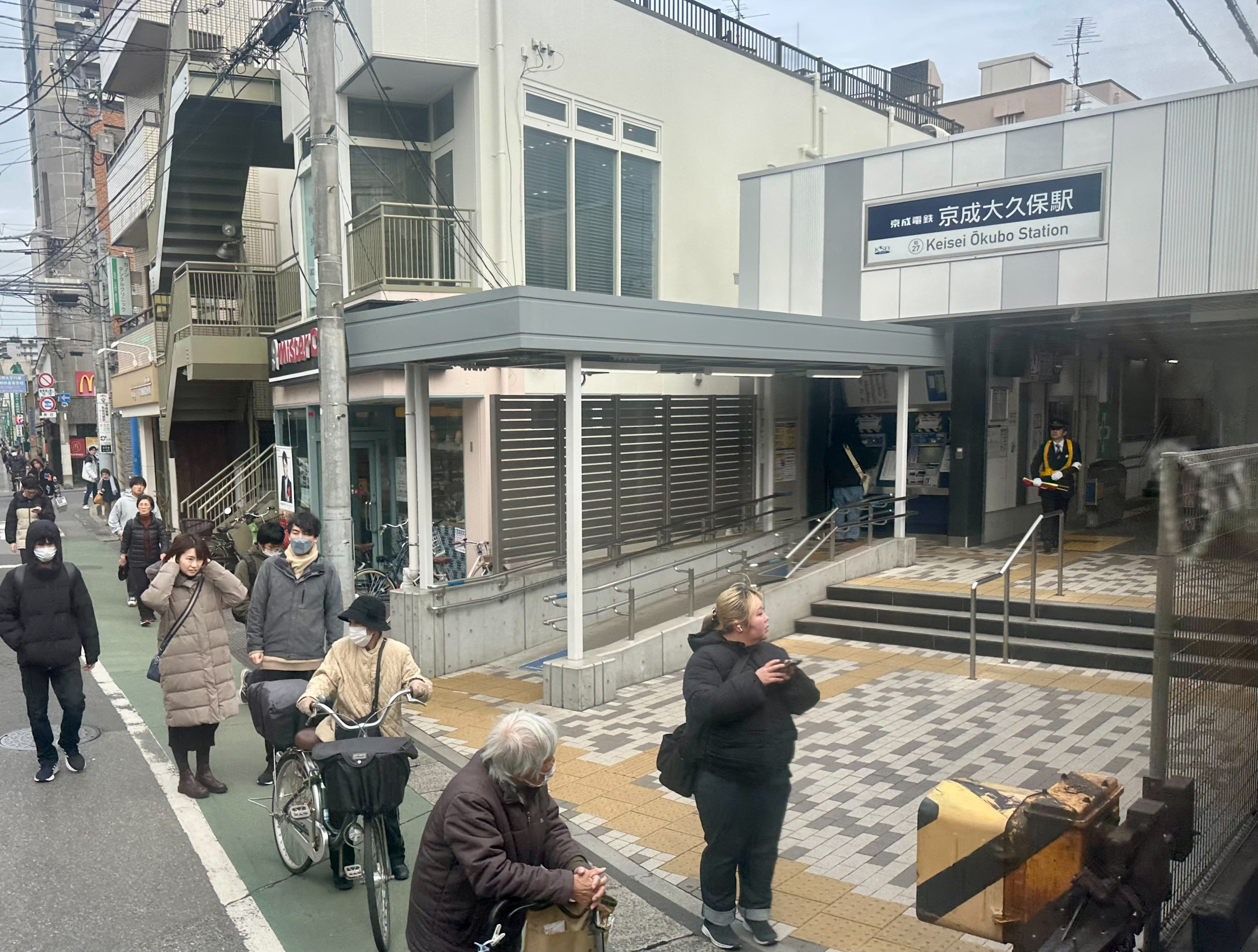
- Keisei-Ōkubo Station, 2025

General information
- Location: 3-10-1 Moto-Ōkubo, Narashino, Chiba-ken 275-0012; Japan
- Coordinates: 35.6862°N 140.0488°E
- Operator: Keisei Electric Railway
- Line: Keisei Main Line
- Distance: 32.1 km from Keisei-Ueno
- Platforms: 2 island platforms

Other information
- Station code: KS27
- Website: Official website

History
- Opened: December 9, 1926
- Former names: Ōkubo Station (to 1931)

Passengers
- FY2019: 35,157 daily

Services
Preceding station	Keisei	Following station
Keisei Tsudanuma KS26 towards Keisei Ueno	Main Line Rapid Local	Mimomi KS28 towards Narita Airport Terminal 1
Location
- Location within Chiba Prefecture Location within Japan

Keisei-Ōkubo Station (京成大久保駅, Keisei-Ōkubo-eki) is a passenger railway station in the city of Narashino, Chiba Prefecture, Japan, operated by the private railway operator Keisei Electric Railway.

== Lines ==
Keisei-Ōkubo Station is served by the Keisei Main Line, and is located 32.1 km from the Tokyo terminus of the Keisei Main Line at Keisei-Ueno Station.

== Station layout ==
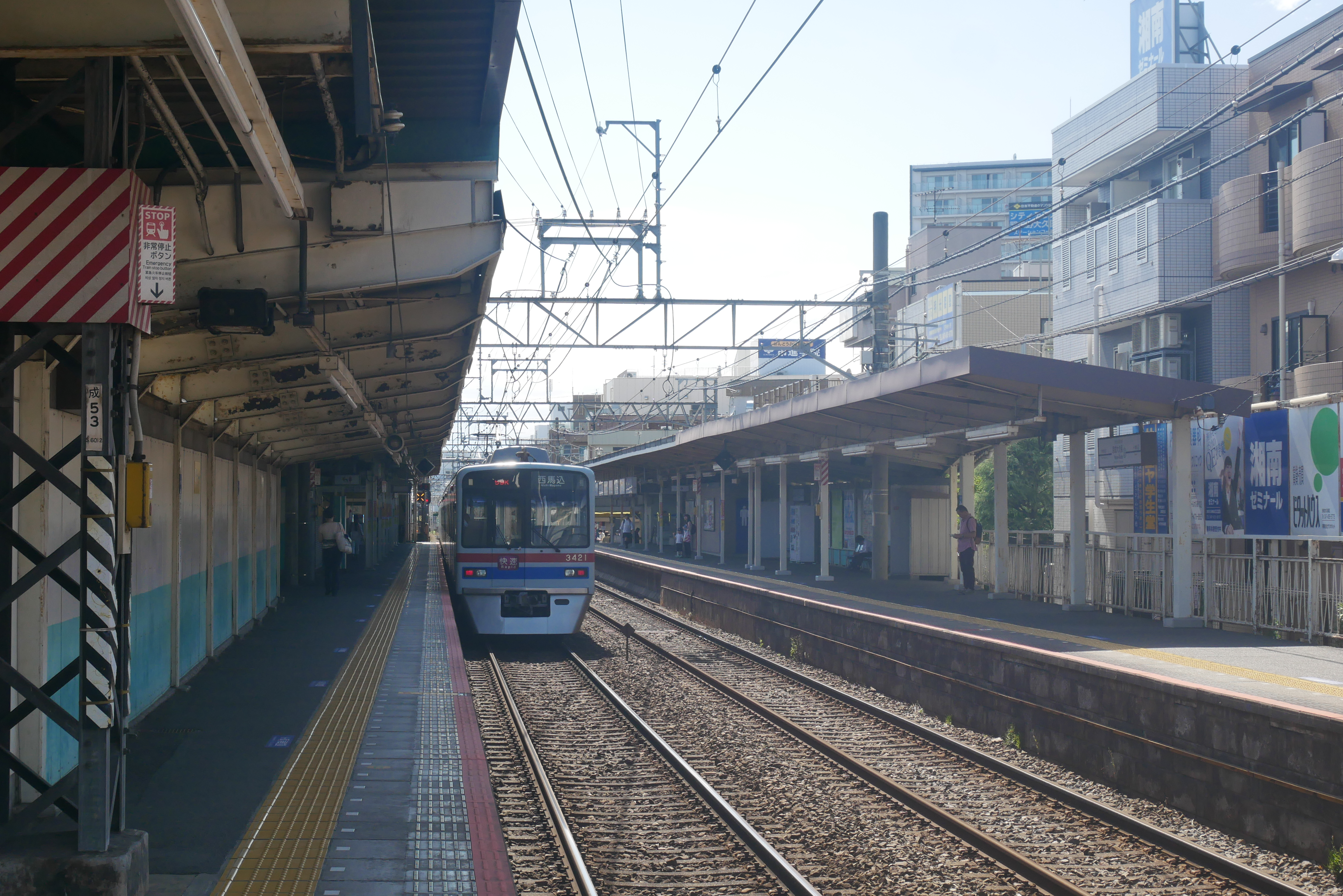
Platforms and train

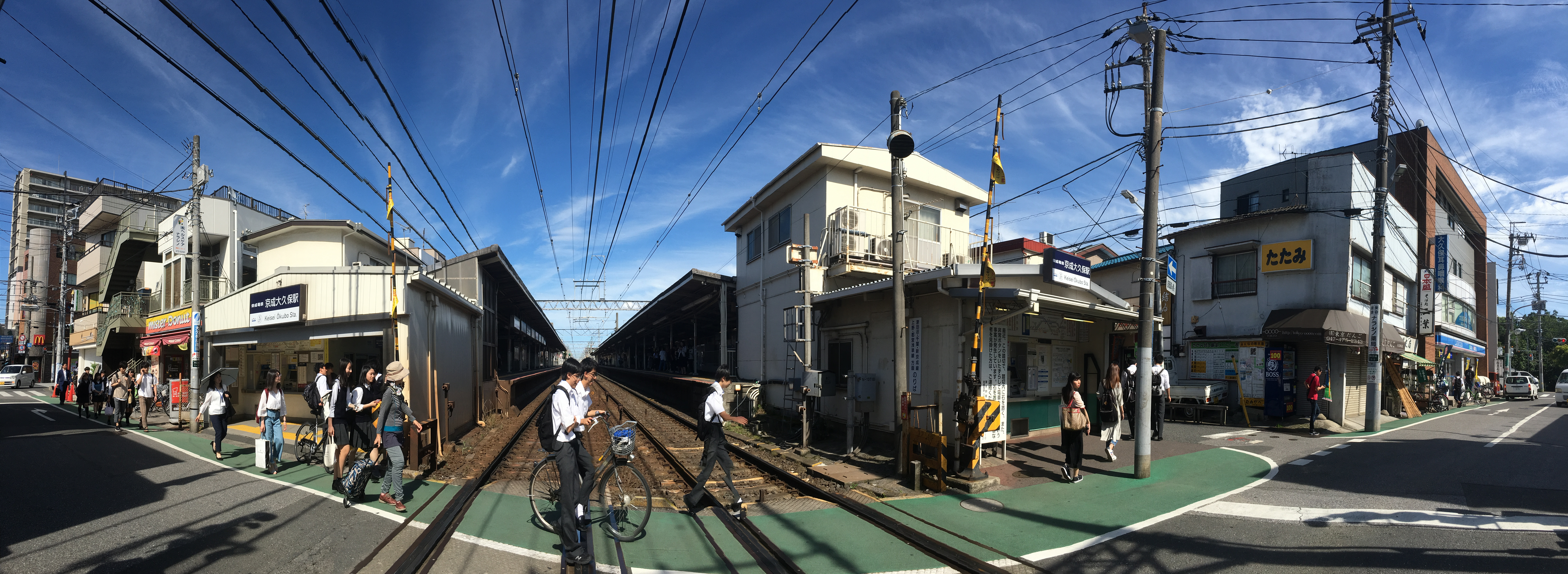
Panorama of both train entrances and tracks

The station consists of two opposed side platforms connected by a level crossing.

=== Platforms ===
1	Keisei Main Line	for Keisei Tsudanuma, Keisei Funabashi, Keisei Takasago, Nippori, Keisei Ueno, and Oshiage; Toei Asakusa Line for Nihombashi, Sengakuji, and Nishi-magome; Keikyu Main Line for Shinagawa and Haneda Airport (International Terminal and Domestic Terminal)
2	Keisei Main Line	for Keisei Narita, and Narita Airport (Terminal 2·3 and Terminal 1)

== History ==
Keisei-Ōkubo Station opened on December 9, 1926 as Ōkubo Station (大久保駅, Ōkubo-eki). It was renamed to its present name on November 18, 1931.

Station numbering was introduced to all Keisei Line stations on 17 July 2010. Keisei-Ōkubo Station was assigned station number KS27.

== Passenger statistics ==
In fiscal 2019, the station was used by an average of 35,157 passengers daily.

== Surrounding area ==
- Okubo, Narashino

== See also ==
- List of railway stations in Japan
