= Daijingūshita Station =

Railway station in Funabashi, Chiba Prefecture, Japan

KS23 Daijingūshita Station 大神宮下駅
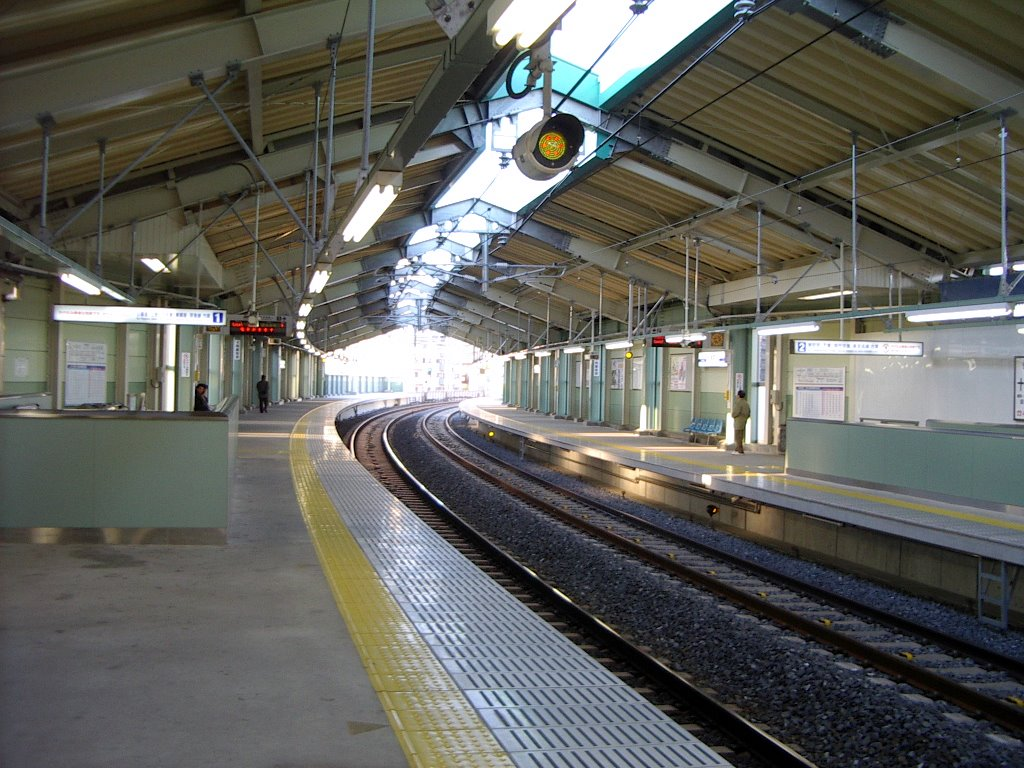
- A view of the platforms

General information
- Location: 2-9-9 Miyamoto, Funabashi-shi, Chiba-ken 273-0003; Japan
- Coordinates: 35.6941°N 139.9916°E
- Operator: Keisei Electric Railway
- Line: Keisei Main Line
- Distance: 26.4 km from Keisei Ueno
- Platforms: 2 side platforms
- Tracks: 2

Other information
- Station code: KS23
- Website: Official website

History
- Opened: December 17, 1921

Passengers
- FY2019: 5,071

Services
Preceding station	Keisei	Following station
Keisei Funabashi KS22 towards Keisei Ueno	Main Line Local	Funabashikeibajō KS24 towards Narita Airport Terminal 1
Location
- Location within Chiba Prefecture Location within Japan

Daijingūshita Station (大神宮下駅, Daijingūshita-eki) is a passenger railway station in the city of Funabashi, Chiba Prefecture, Japan, operated by the private railway operator Keisei Electric Railway.

== Lines ==
Daijingūshita Station is served by the Keisei Main Line, and is located 26.4 km from the terminus of the line at Keisei Ueno Station.

== Station layout ==
The station consists of two elevated opposed side platforms connected via an underpass to the station building underneath.

=== Platforms ===
1	Keisei Main Line	for Keisei Funabashi, Aoto, Nippori, and Keisei Ueno
2	Keisei Main Line	for Keisei Tsudanuma, Keisei Chiba, Chiharadai, Keisei Narita, and Narita Airport (Terminal 2·3 and Terminal 1)

== History ==
Daijingūshita Station was opened on 17 December 1921. In 2004, Platform 1 was elevated, and in 2006, platform 2 was elevated.

Station numbering was introduced to all Keisei Line stations on 17 July 2010. Daijingūshita was assigned station number KS23.

== Passenger statistics ==
In the 2015 data available from Japan’s Ministry of Land, Infrastructure, Transport and Tourism, Daijingūshita was one of the train segments among Tokyo's most crowded train lines during rush hour.

In fiscal 2019, the station was used by an average of 5,071 passengers daily.

== Surrounding area ==
- Funabashi-Daijingū Shrine

== See also ==
- List of railway stations in Japan
