= Tsudanuma =

Tsudanuma 津田沼
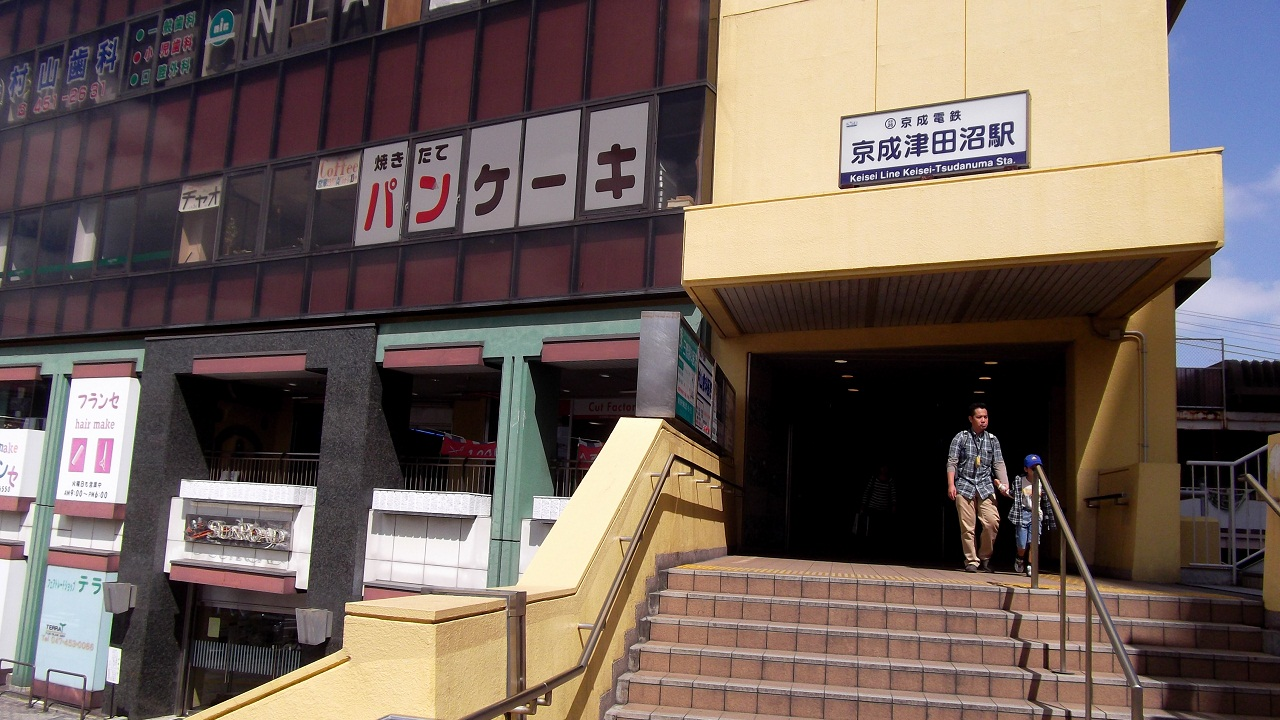
- Keisei Tsudanuma Station

- Location within Chiba Prefecture
- Coordinates: 35.6823°N 140.0229°E
- Country: Japan
- Prefecture: Chiba Prefecture
- City: Narashino City

Population (September 2017)
  - Total: 15,736
- Time zone: UTC+9 (Japan Standard Time)
- Postal code: 275-0016
- Area code: 047
- Vehicle registration: Narashino

Tsudanuma (津田沼) is a district of Narashino City, Chiba Prefecture, Japan, consisting of 1-chōme to 7-chōme. The name “Tsudanuma” is also used to refer to the area around Tsudanuma Station ranging over Narashino and Funabashi cities.

== Etymology ==
The name Tsudanuma came from kanji characters of three villages: Yatsu (谷津), Kuguta (久々田), and Saginuma (鷺沼).

== Character ==
Tsudanuma is a residential area, largely by virtue of being a commuter suburb of Tokyo. It is mentioned in Haruki Murakami's novels 1Q84, Hard-Boiled Wonderland and the End of the World, and Sputnik Sweetheart.

== Demographics ==
The population as of October 31st 2017 is shown below.

Chōme	Households	Population
1-chōme	673	1,188
2-chōme	1,679	3,337
3-chōme	1,947	3,782
4-chōme	612	1,212
5-chōme	1,012	2,010
6-chōme	853	1,851
7-chōme	1,139	2,386
Total	7,917	15,766

== Transportation ==
=== Rail service ===
The Tsudanuma area is directly served by three stations:

- Tsudanuma Station (JR East Sōbu Main Line)
- Keisei Tsudanuma Station ( Keisei Main Line, Keisei Chiba Line, and Keisei Matsudo Line)
- Shin-Tsudanuma Station ( Keisei Matsudo Line)

=== Bus service ===
There is a fleet of Shin-Keisei buses which depart from JR Tsudanuma station.

=== Taxi service ===
Taxis are available at all three railway stations.

== Commerce ==
Shops and department stores surround JR Tsudanuma station.

- Aeon Mall Tsudanuma (Tsudanuma 1-chōme)
- Ito Yokado Tsudanuma (Tsudanuma 1-chōme)
- Kanadenomori Forte (Kanadenomori 2-chōme)
- Mina Tsudanuma (Tsudanuma 1-chōme)
- Morisia Tsudanuma (Yatsu 1-chōme)
- Tsudanuma Parco (Maebara-Nishi 2-chōme, Funabashi City)

== Education ==
There are a number of public schools in the area as well as the Chiba Institute of Technology and O-Hara Graduate School. For continuing education, Narashino Bunka Hall (習志野文化ホール) is located on the south exit of JR Tsudanuma station.
