= Funabashikeibajō Station =

Railway station in Funabashi, Chiba Prefecture, Japan

KS24 Funabashikeibajō Station 船橋競馬場駅
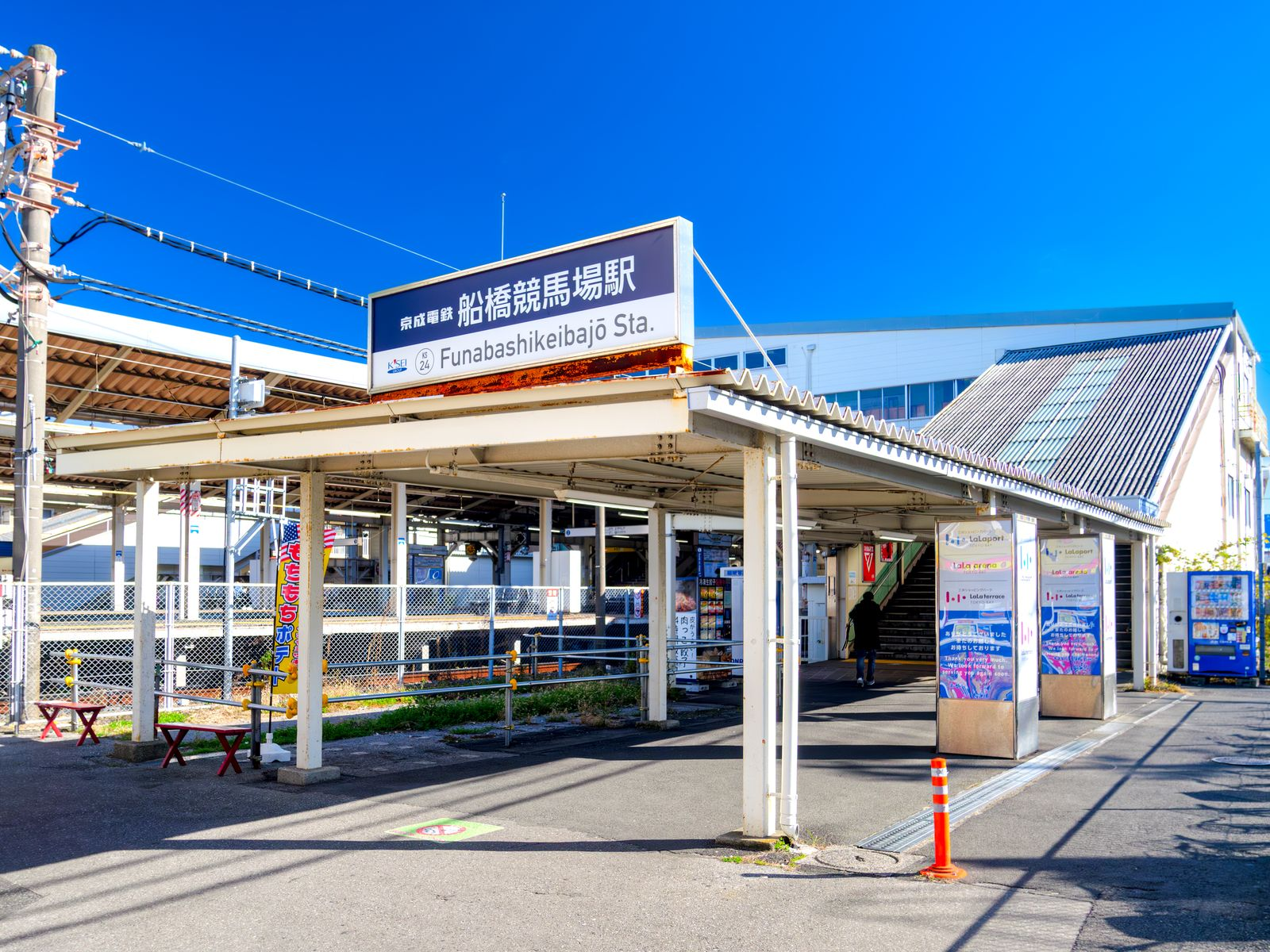
- The south entrance to Funabashikeibajō Station in December 2024

General information
- Location: 8-42-1 Miyamoto, Funabashi-shi, Chiba-ken 273-0003; Japan
- Coordinates: 35°41′23.11″N 139°59′52.49″E
- Operator: Keisei Electric Railway
- Line: Keisei Main Line
- Distance: 27.2 km from Keisei Ueno
- Platforms: 2 island platforms
- Tracks: 4

Other information
- Station code: KS24
- Website: Official website

History
- Opened: 22 August 1927
- Former names: Hanawa (to 1931), Keisei Hanawa (to 1950), Center-Keibajō-mae (until 1987)

Passengers
- FY2019: 20,709 daily

Services
Preceding station	Keisei	Following station
Keisei Funabashi KS22 towards Keisei Ueno	Main Line Rapid	Keisei Tsudanuma KS26 towards Narita Airport Terminal 1
Daijingūshita KS23 towards Keisei Ueno	Main Line Local	Yatsu KS25 towards Narita Airport Terminal 1
Location
- Location within Chiba Prefecture Location within Japan

Funabashikeibajō Station (船橋競馬場駅, Funabashikeibajō-eki) is a passenger railway station in the city of Funabashi, Chiba Prefecture, Japan, operated by the private railway operator Keisei Electric Railway.The station name refers to the nearby Funabashi Racecourse.

== Lines ==
Funabashikeibajō Station is served by the Keisei Main Line, and is located 27.2 km from the terminus of the line at Keisei Ueno Station.

== Station layout ==
The station consists of two island platforms connected by a footbridge to the elevated station building.

=== Platforms ===
1-2	Keisei Main Line	for Keisei Funabashi, Keisei Takasago, Nippori, Keisei Ueno, and Oshiage; Toei Asakusa Line for Nihombashi, Sengakuji, and Nishi-magome; Keikyu Main Line for Shinagawa and Haneda Airport (International Terminal and Domestic Terminal)
3-4	Keisei Main Line	for Keisei Tsudanuma, Keisei Chiba, Chiharadai, Keisei Narita, and Narita Airport (Terminal 2·3 and Terminal 1)

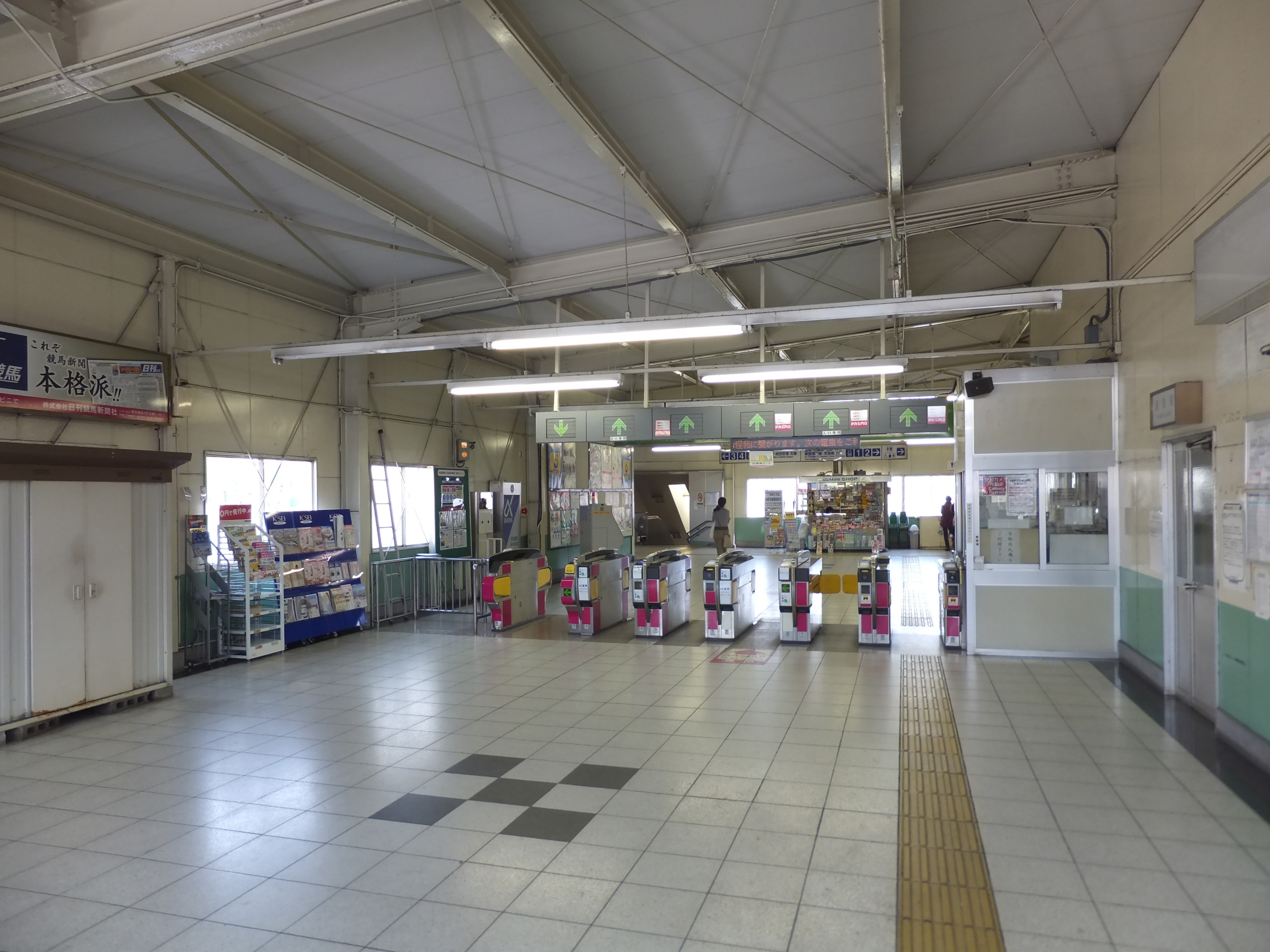
The ticket barriers in April 2012

== History ==
The station opened on 22 August 1927 as Hanawa Station (花輪駅). It was renamed Keisei Hanawa Station (京成花輪駅) on 18 November 1931, becoming Funabashi-Keibajō (船橋競馬場駅) on 5 July 1950, and then Center-Keibajō-mae (センター競馬場前駅) on 1 December 1963. The station was renamed Funabashikeibajō Station on 1 April 1987.

Station numbering was introduced to all Keisei Line stations on 17 July 2010. Funabashikeibajō was assigned station number KS24.

== Passenger statistics ==
In fiscal 2019, the station was used by an average of 20,709 passengers daily.

== Surrounding area ==
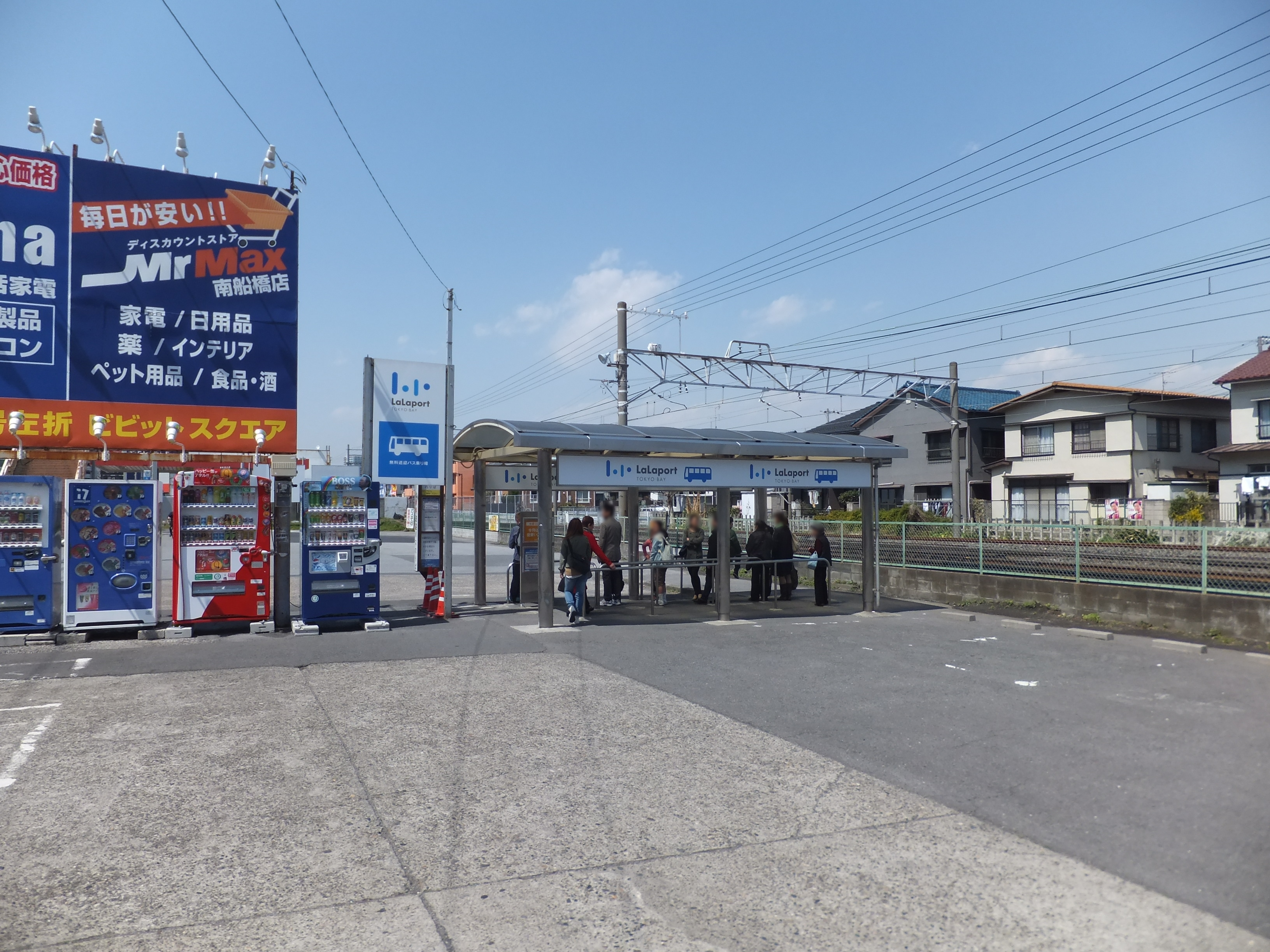
The bus stop near the station for buses to the LaLaport shopping mall

- Funabashi Racecourse
- LaLaport Tokyo Bay shopping mall

== See also ==
- List of railway stations in Japan
