= Narashino =

Narashino 習志野市
- City
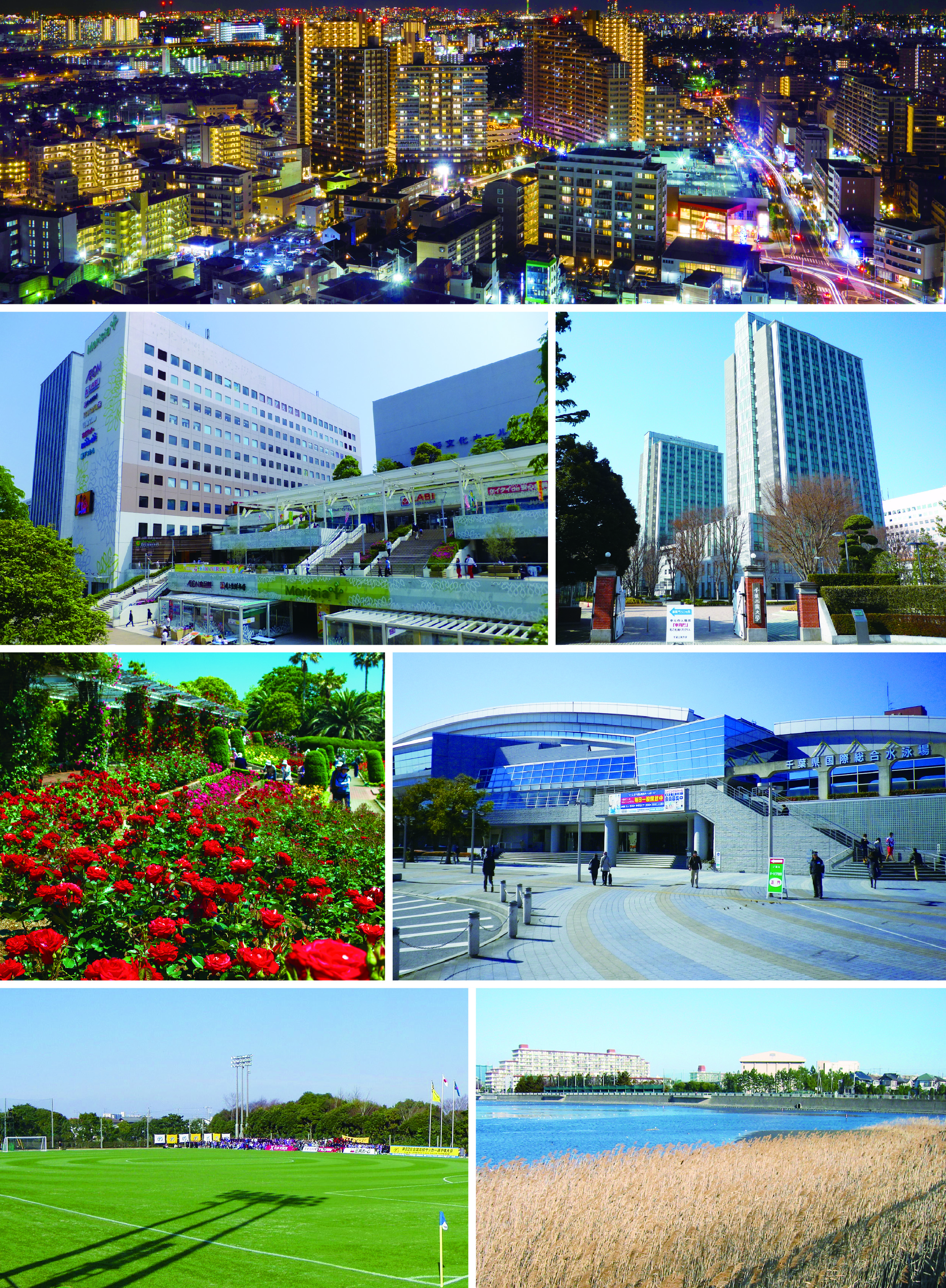
downtown at night
Morisia Tsudanuma	Chiba Institute of Technology
Yatsu Rose Garden	Chiba International Swimming Center
Frontier Soccer Field	Yatsu-higata
- Flag Seal

- Location of Narashino in Chiba Prefecture

- Coordinates: 35°40′49.4″N 140°01′35.4″E
- Country: Japan
- Region: Kantō
- Prefecture: Chiba

Government
  - Mayor: Taisuke Miyamoto (since May 2011)

Area
  - Total: 20.97 km^{2} (8.10 sq mi)

Population (November 30, 2020)
  - Total: 175,292
  - Density: 8,359/km^{2} (21,650/sq mi)
- Time zone: UTC+9 (Japan Standard Time)
- Tree: Acacia
- Flower: Hydrangea
- Phone number: 047-451-1151
- Address: 2-1-1 Saginuma, Narashino-shi, Chiba-ken 275-8601
- Website: Official website

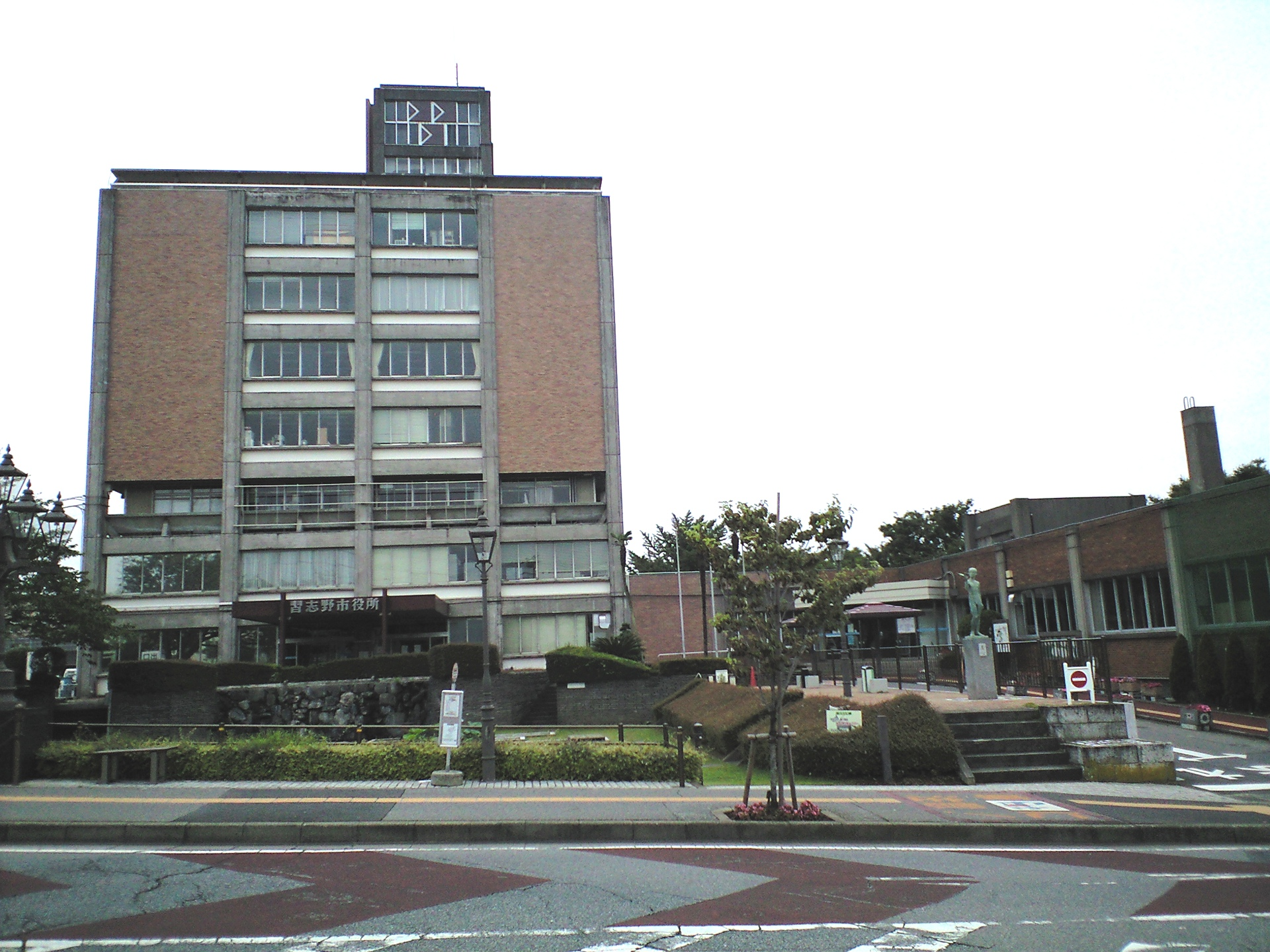
Narashino City Hall

Narashino (習志野市, Narashino-shi) is a city located in Chiba Prefecture, Japan. As of 30 November 2020, the city had an estimated population of 175,292 in 81,985 households and a population density of 8400 persons per km^{2}. The total area of the city is 20.97 square kilometres (8.10 sq mi)

== Geography ==
Narashino is located in far northwestern Chiba Prefecture, bordered by Tokyo Bay to the southwest, and the prefectural capital of Chiba to the east. It is approximately 20 to 30 kilometers from central Tokyo.

The city is located on the Shimōsa Plateau and reclaimed land fill on Tokyo Bay, with a large difference in elevation from the inland area to the coastal area.

=== Surrounding municipalities ===
Chiba Prefecture

- Chiba
- Funabashi
- Yachiyo

=== Climate ===
Narashino has a humid subtropical climate (Köppen Cfa) characterized by warm summers and cool winters with light to no snowfall. The average annual temperature in Narashino is 15.4 °C. The average annual rainfall is 1410 mm with September as the wettest month. The temperatures are highest on average in August, at around 26.9 °C, and lowest in January, at around 4.9 °C.

== Demographics ==
Per Japanese census data, the population of Narashino increased rapidly between 1950 and 1990 and has grown at a slower pace since.

Historical population
Year	Pop.	±%
1950	28,667	—
1960	42,167	+47.1%
1970	99,995	+137.1%
1980	125,155	+25.2%
1990	151,471	+21.0%
2000	154,036	+1.7%
2010	164,530	+6.8%
2020	176,167	+7.1%

== History ==
The area around Narashino has been inhabited since prehistoric times. Archaeologists have found shell middens and numerous other remains from Jōmon period, as well as burial tumuli from the Kofun period. However, for most of its history, the area was a sparsely populated wetland and swamp along the northern shore of Edo Bay.

After the Meiji Restoration, Tsudanuma (津田沼村, Tsudanuma-mura) was founded within Chiba District on April 1, 1889 on the merger of five small hamlets with a total population of 4500 people. The area only began to develop with the coming of the railway, and Tsudanuma was raised to town status on March 3, 1903, with a population of 6000.

The Narashino area of Tsudanuma was used for cavalry maneuvers by the Imperial Guard and the early Imperial Japanese Army, and was visited by the Meiji Emperor early in the Meiji period (1868 – 1912). A prisoner of war camp was built in 1904 to house POWs from the Russo-Japanese War of 1904-1905 and World War I. The Imperial Japanese Army Narashino School was the main training school for cavalry, and later for tank warfare.

On August 1, 1954, Tsudanuma merged with a portion of the neighboring city of Chiba (the former town of Makuhari) to form the new city of Narashino.

== Neighborhoods ==
- Akanehama
- Akitsu
- Fujisaki
- Hanasaki
- Higashi-Narashino
- Izumicho
- Kanadenomori
- Kasumi
- Mimomi
- Moto-Okubo
- Okubo
- Saginuma
- Saginumadai
- Shibazono
- Shin-ei
- Sodegaura
- Tsudanuma
- Yashiki
- Yatsu
- Yatsumachi

== Government ==
Narashino has a mayor-council form of government with a directly elected mayor and a unicameral city council of 30 members. Narashino contributes two members to the Chiba Prefectural Assembly. In terms of national politics, the city is part of Chiba 2nd district of the lower house of the Diet of Japan.

== Economy ==
Narashino is a regional commercial center and a bedroom community for nearby Chiba and Tokyo, with 32,7% of the residents commuting to Tokyo per the 2010 census, and 11.7% to Funabashi and 10.5% to Chiba. The coastal area, mostly on reclaimed land is part of the Keiyō Industrial Zone and is home to much heavy industry, especially related to chemical processing.

== Transportation ==
=== Railways ===
JR East – Sōbu Main Line

■ Tsudanuma

JR East – Keiyō Line

■Shin-Narashino -

Keisei Electric Railway - Main Line

■Yatsu - Keisei Tsudanuma - Keisei Ōkubo - Mimomi

Keisei Electric Railway - Chiba Line

■ Keisei Tsudanuma

Keisei Electric Railway - Matsudo Line

■ Keisei Tsudanuma - Shin-Tsudanuma

=== Highways ===
- Keiyō Road
- Higashi-Kantō Expressway
- National Route 126
- National Route 357

== Education ==
- Chiba Institute of Technology
- Narashino has 16 public elementary schools and eight public middle schools operated by the city government, and four public high schools operated by the Chiba Prefectural Board of Education.

== Local attractions ==
- Akitsu Baseball Stadium
- Chiba International General Swimming Center
- Frontier Soccer Field (naming rights from April 1, 2015 to March 31, 2018), formerly known as Akitsu Soccer Stadium.
- Ōnomatsu stable

== Notable places ==
- Yatsu-higata (谷津干潟), a Ramsar Site and protected wetlands for migratory birds. The spring and summer months see an increase of jellyfish and small crabs to the wetlands.
- Yatsu Rose Garden (谷津バラ園), a rose garden which displays over 6,000 individual blossoms in May and October. The garden was founded with Yatsu Yūen (谷津遊園), an amusement park which was managed by Keisei Electric Railway and closed in 1982. When the park was closed, the city bought the garden, and has managed it since that time.

== Sister cities ==
- Tuscaloosa, Alabama, United States

== Noted people from Narashino ==
- Daiki Arioka, Hey! Say! JUMP
- Kazuya Fukuura, professional baseball player for the Chiba Lotte Marines (1994–present)
- Kota Hattori, professional soccer player
- Hideaki Kitajima,– professional soccer player for Kashiwa Reysol (1997-2002, 2006-2012)
- Makoto Sunakawa, professional soccer player
- Daichi Suzuki, swimmer, Olympic gold medalist in 100m backstroke at 1988 Summer Olympics
- Masaaki Takada, professional soccer player
- Hōō Umagorō, sumo wrestler
