= Yatsu-higata =

Tidal flat in Narashino, Chiba Prefecture, Japan

Coordinates: 35°40′N 140°00′E

Designations

Ramsar Wetland
- Designated: 10 June 1993
- Reference no.: 615

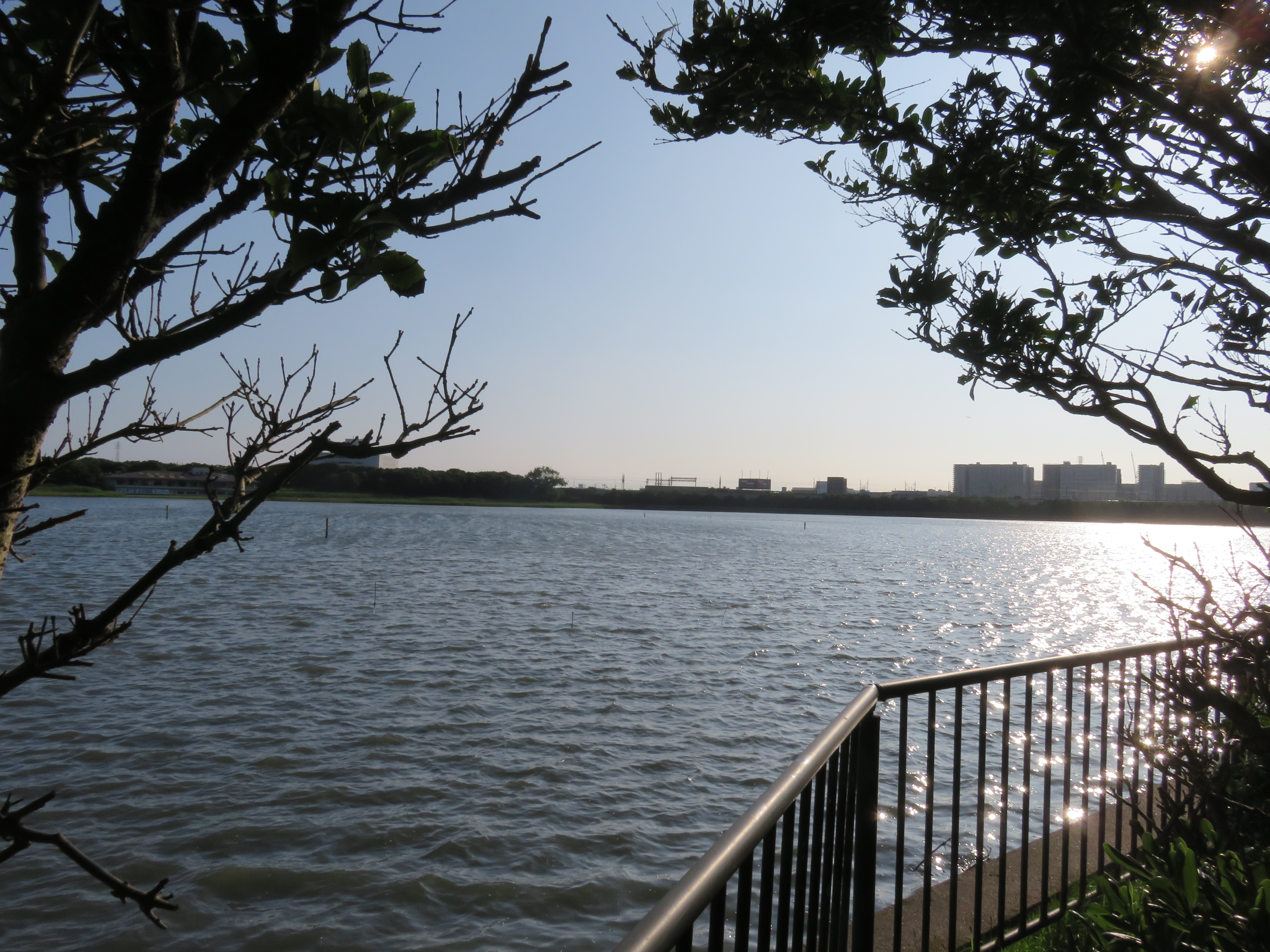

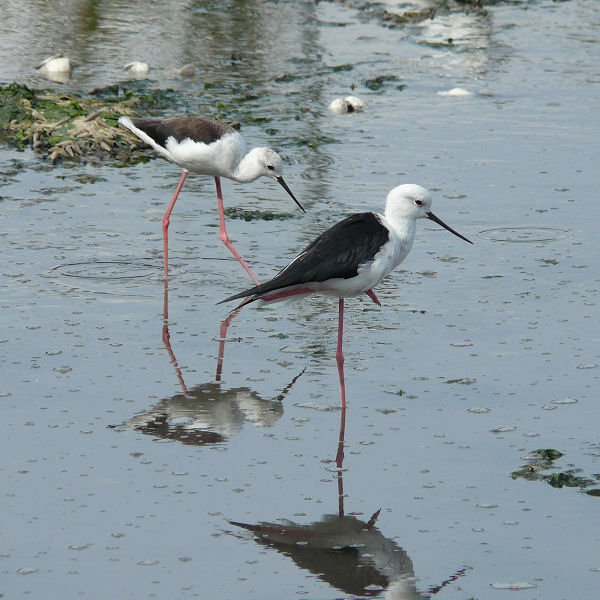
Black-winged stilts in Yatsu-higata tidal flats near Tokyo Bay

Yatsu-higata (谷津干潟) is a tidal flat in Narashino, Chiba Prefecture, Japan, 2 km from Tokyo Bay. Once a part of the largest tidal flats in Japan, much of the area has been reclaimed. Forty hectares of wetland were designated a Ramsar Site in 1993.

== Access ==
- From KEISEI LINE Station Yatsu.

25 minutes walk toward the South. Walk through the shopping road and along the periphery of the tidal flat.

- From JR KEIYO LINE Station Minami Funabashi.

20 minutes walk toward the East. Walk through the pedestrian bridge ROUTE 357 and along the periphery of the tidal flat.

- From JR SOUBU LINE Station Tsudanuma.

Bus (No. 10) to "Tsudanuma Koukou". 10 min. walk toward the West. Bus (No. 9) to "Yatsu Higata" (Terminal stop) 15 min. walk toward the South.

- By Car

Parking lot accommodates 100 cars. VIA ROUTE 357 from the West (from Tokyo to Chiba) Pass the intersection Wakamatsu. Parking gate on the left after 1 km. In the case of highway leave at the interchange (Wangan Chiba).

== See also ==
- Ramsar Sites in Japan
