= Okubo, Narashino =

Okubo 大久保
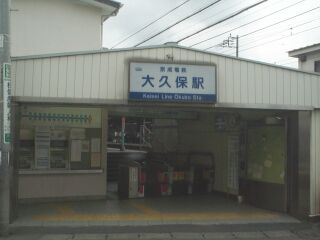
- Keisei Ōkubo Station, in Moto-Okubo, Narashino

- Location within Chiba Prefecture
- Coordinates: 35.6879°N 140.0493°E
- Country: Japan
- Prefecture: Chiba Prefecture
- City: Narashino City

Area
  - Total: 0.667 km^{2} (0.258 sq mi)

Population (September 2018)
  - Total: 9,298
  - Density: 13,900/km^{2} (36,100/sq mi)
- Time zone: UTC+9 (Japan Standard Time)
- Postal code: 275-0011
- Area code: 047
- Vehicle registration: Narashino

Okubo (大久保, Ōkubo) is a district of Narashino City, Chiba Prefecture, Japan, consisting of 1-chōme to 4-chōme. The name “Okubo” is also used to refer to the area around Keisei Ōkubo Station.

== Etymology ==
The name Okubo came from a sunken place (Kubo) of a tributary of the Hamada River or Okubo clan, a hatamoto of the neighborhood in the Edo period.

== Demographics ==
The population as of September 2018 is shown below.

Chōme	Population	Density (/km^{2})
1-chōme	3,095	13,520
2-chōme	2,794	15,880
3-chōme	1,888	17,160
4-chōme	1,521	10,010
Total	9,298	13,940

== Transportation ==
=== Rail service ===
- Keisei Electric Railway - Keisei Main Line
  - KS27 Keisei Ōkubo Station

=== Bus service ===
- Narashino City Happy Bus - Keisei Ōkubo Station Route
  - Okubo 1-chōme - Keisei Ōkubo Station North Entrance

== Commerce ==
Commercial area locates to the north of Keisei Ōkubo Station.

- Okubo Shopping District
- Maruetsu Okubo-ekimae

== Education ==
- Narashino City Okubo-Higashi Elementary School
