= Mimomi Station =

Railway station in Narashino, Chiba Prefecture, Japan

KS28 Mimomi Station 実籾駅
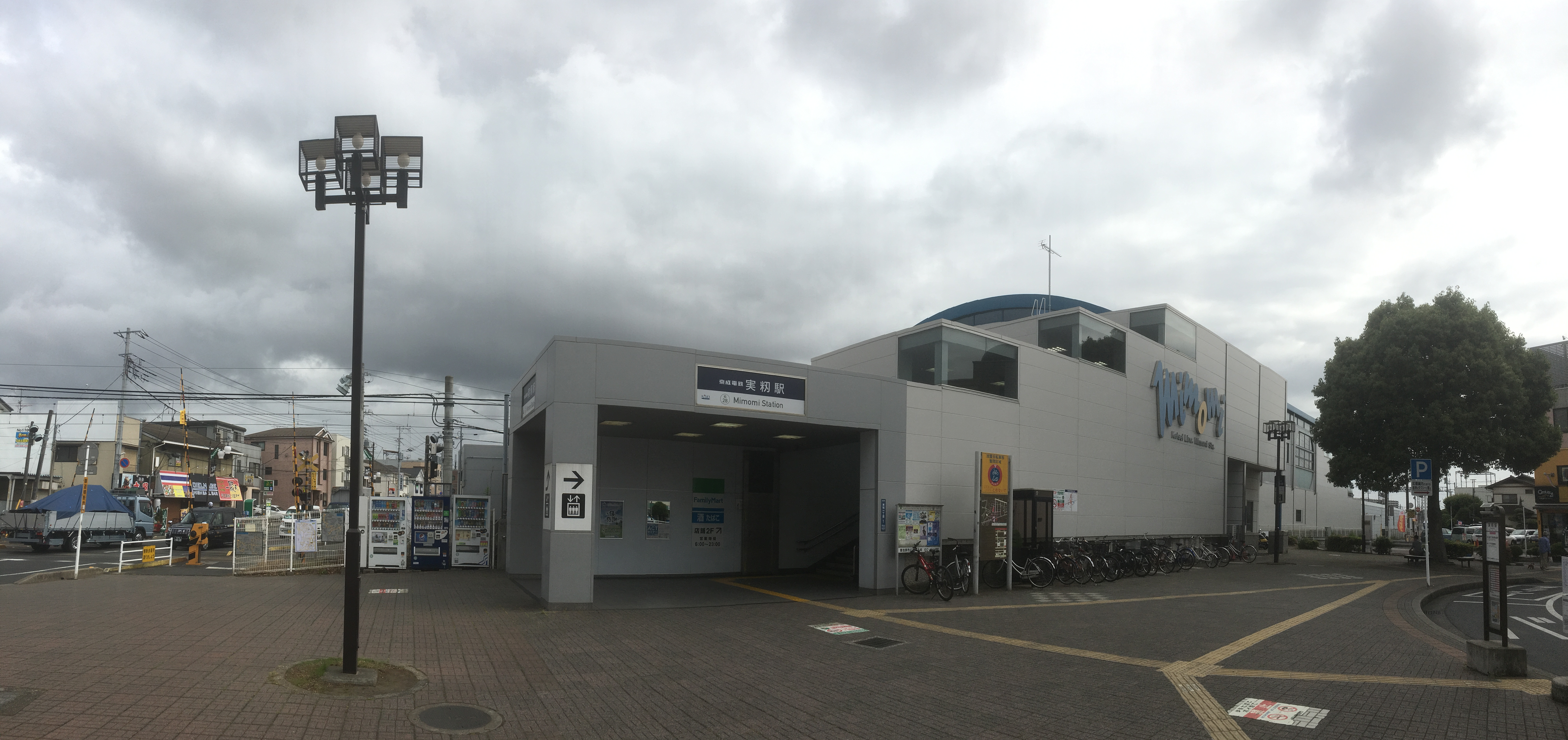
- Mimomi Station, North Exit (2019)

General information
- Location: 1-1-1 Mimomi, Narashino-shi, Chiba-ken 275-0002; Japan
- Coordinates: 35.6866°N 140.0685°E
- Operator: Keisei Electric Railway
- Line: Keisei Main Line
- Distance: 34.0 km from Keisei-Ueno
- Platforms: 2 side platforms

Other information
- Station code: KS28
- Website: Official website

History
- Opened: December 9, 1926

Passengers
- FY2019: 24,299

Services
Preceding station	Keisei	Following station
Keisei Ōkubo KS27 towards Keisei Ueno	Main Line Rapid Local	Yachiyodai KS29 towards Narita Airport Terminal 1
Location
- Location within Chiba Prefecture Location within Japan

Mimomi Station (実籾駅, Mimomi-eki) is a passenger railway station located in the city of Narashino, Chiba Prefecture Japan, operated by the private railway company, Keisei Electric Railway.

== Lines ==
Mimomi Station is served by the Keisei Main Line and is located 34.0 km from the official starting point of the line at Keisei-Ueno Station.

== Station layout ==
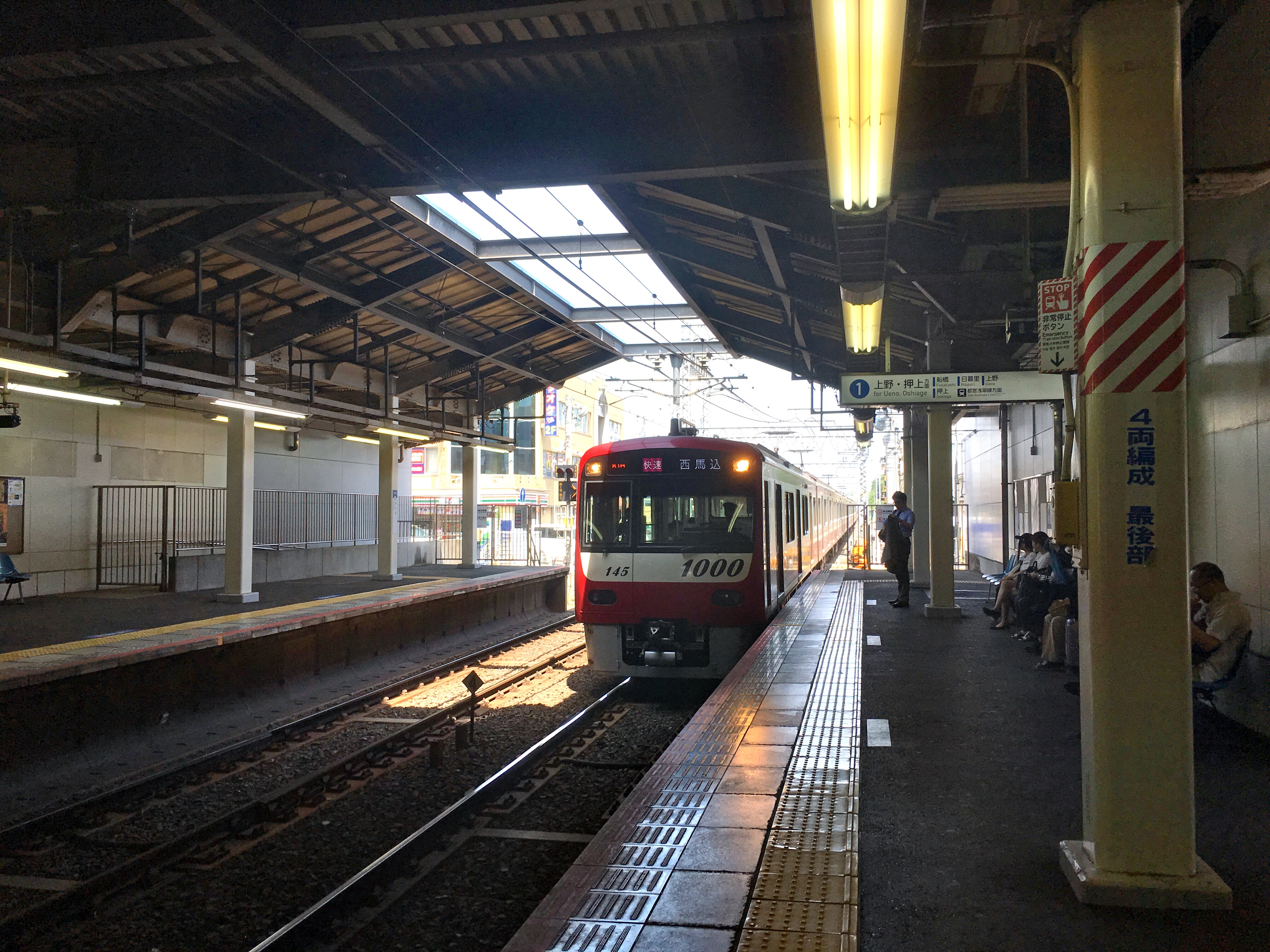
Platforms, 2019

Mimomi Station has two opposed side platforms connected by a footbridge to the elevated station building.

=== Platforms ===
1	■ Keisei Main Line	For Keisei-Tsudanuma・Keisei-Takasago・Nippori・Keisei-Ueno
2	■ Keisei Main Line	For Higashi-Narita・Keisei-Narita・Narita Airport

== History ==
Mimomi Station was opened on 9 December 1926.

Station numbering was introduced to all Keisei Line stations on 17 July 2010. Mimomi Station was assigned station number KS28.

== Passenger statistics ==
In fiscal 2019, the station was used by an average of 24,299 passengers daily (boarding passengers only).

== Surrounding area ==
- Narashino Municipal Narashino High School
- Toho Junior and Senior High School
- Narashino City Fourth Junior High School
- Narashino City Second Junior High School
- Narashino City Mimomi Elementary School
- Narashino City Higashinarashino Elementary School

== See also ==
- List of railway stations in Japan
