= Keisei Funabashi Station =

Railway station in Funabashi, Chiba Prefecture, Japan

KS22 Keisei Funabashi Station 京成船橋駅
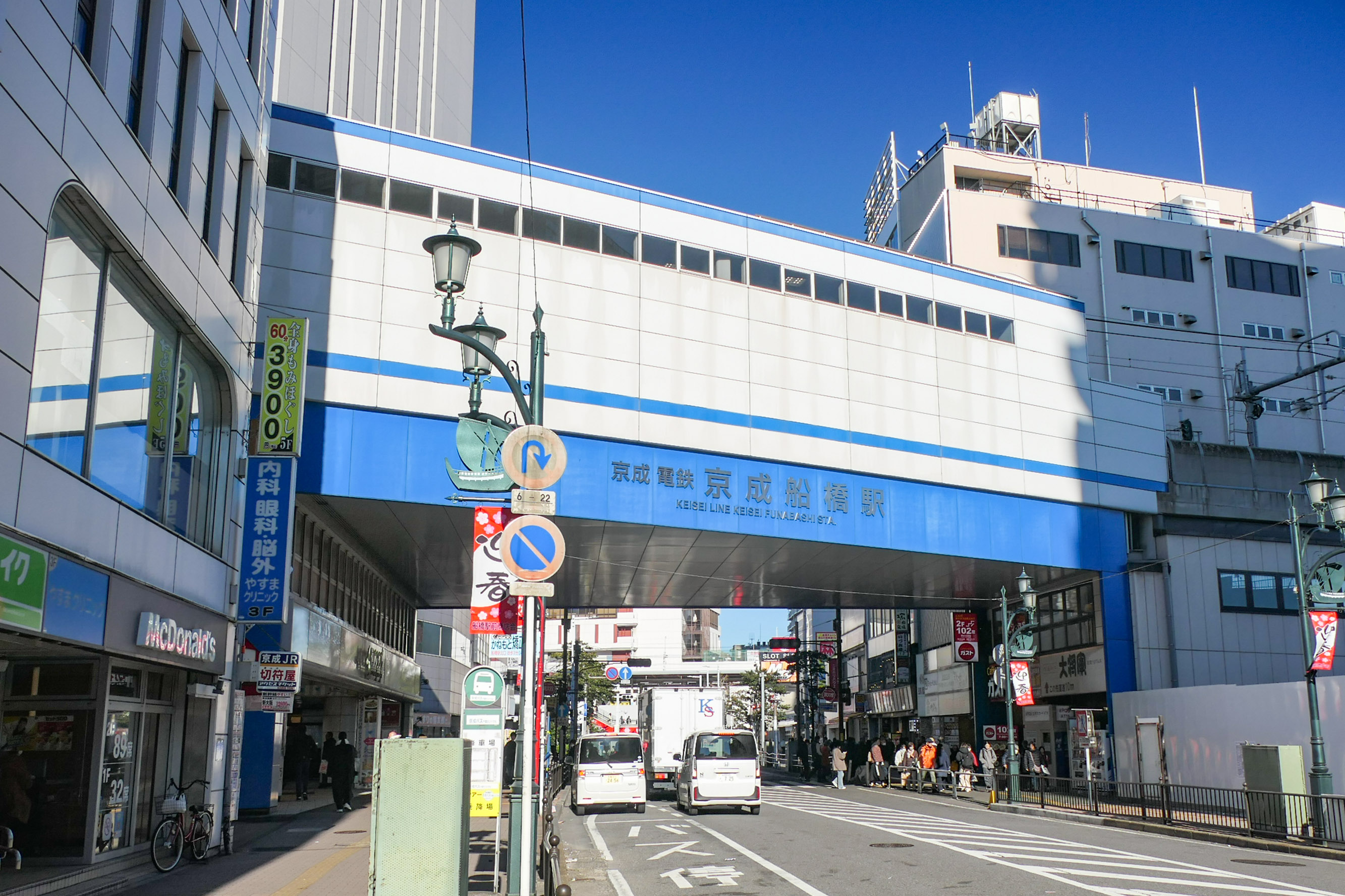
- Main station entrance, December 2025

General information
- Location: 1-5-1 Honchō, Funabashi-shi, Chiba-ken 273-0005; Japan
- Coordinates: 35.699948°N 139.985132°E
- Operator: Keisei Electric Railway
- Line: Keisei Main Line
- Distance: 25.1 km from Keisei Ueno
- Platforms: 2 side platforms
- Tracks: 2
- Connections: JO25 JB31 TD35 Funabashi Station

Construction
- Structure type: Elevated
- Accessible: Yes

Other information
- Station code: KS22
- Website: Official website

History
- Opened: December 30, 1916
- Former names: Funabashi (until 1931)

Passengers
- FY2019: 93,281 daily

Services
Preceding station	Keisei	Following station
Aoto KS09 towards Keisei Ueno	Morningliner; Eveningliner	Yachiyodai KS29 towards Narita Airport Terminal 1
Keisei Yawata KS16 towards Keisei Ueno	Main Line Rapid Limited Express Limited Express Commuter Express	Keisei Tsudanuma KS26 towards Narita Airport Terminal 1
Higashi-Nakayama KS19 towards Keisei Ueno	Main Line Rapid	Funabashikeibajō KS24 towards Narita Airport Terminal 1
Kaijin KS21 towards Keisei Ueno	Main Line Local	Daijingūshita KS23 towards Narita Airport Terminal 1
Location
- Location within Chiba Prefecture

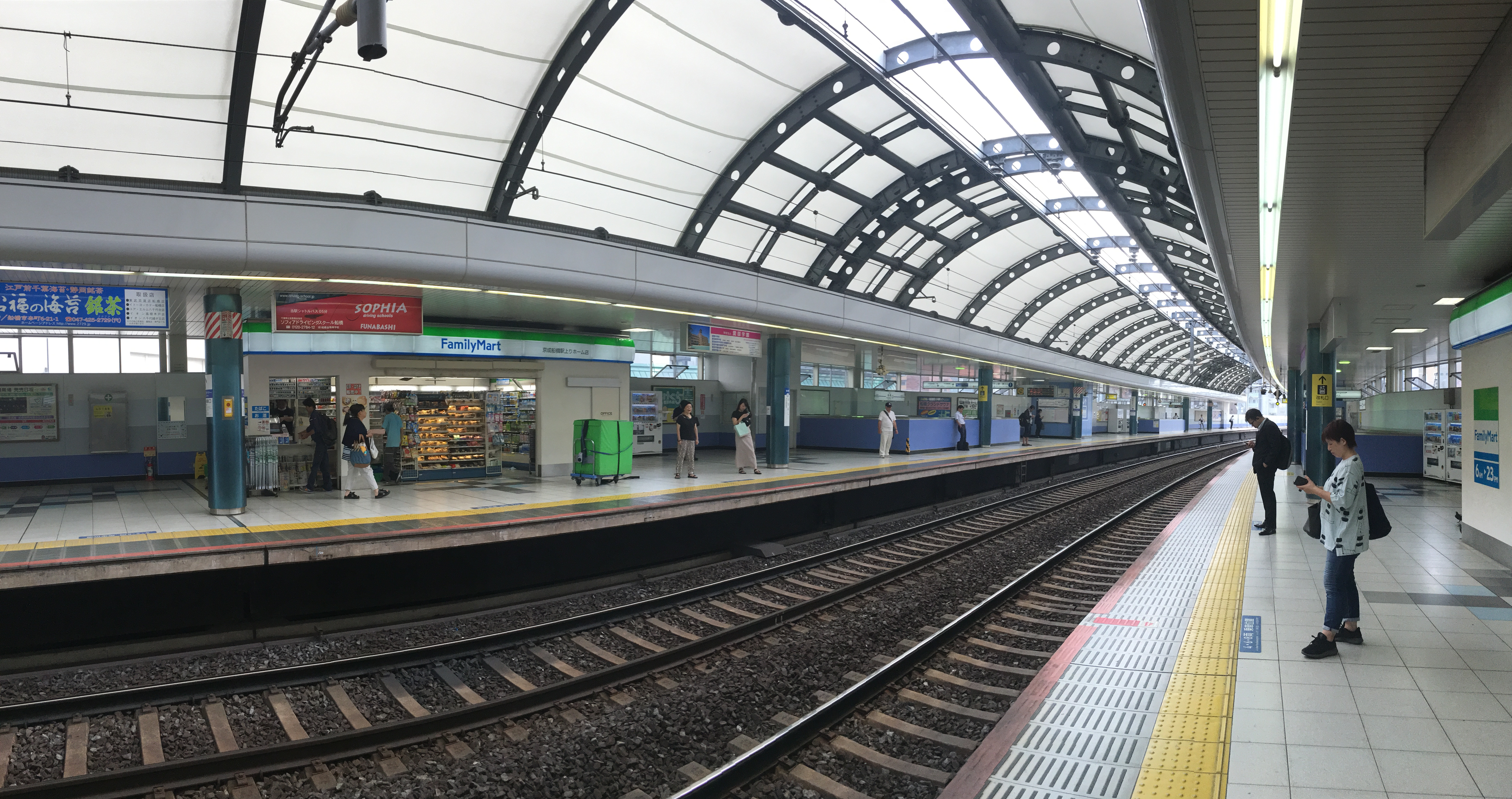
Station platforms, 2019

Keisei Funabashi Station (京成船橋駅, Keisei-Funabashi-eki) is a passenger railway station in the city of Funabashi, Chiba Prefecture, Japan, operated by the private railway operator Keisei Electric Railway.

== Lines ==
Keisei Funabashi Station is served by the Keisei Main Line, and is located 25.1 km from the Tokyo terminus at Keisei Ueno Station. Passengers can also transfer to the JR Sōbu Main Line and Tōbu Urban Park Line via a pedestrian passage.

== Station layout ==
The station consists of two elevated opposed side platforms serving two platforms. The platforms are connected via an underpass to the station building.

=== Platforms ===
1	Keisei Main Line	for Aoto, Nippori, Keisei Ueno, and Oshiage; Toei Asakusa Line for Nihombashi and Nishi-magome; Keikyū Main Line for Haneda Airport (Terminal 3 and Terminal 1·2)
2	Keisei Main Line	for Keisei Tsudanuma, Keisei Chiba, Keisei Narita, and Narita Airport (Terminal 2·3 and Terminal 1)

== History ==
The station opened on 30 December 1916, initially named simply Funabashi Station (船橋駅). This was renamed Keisei Funabashi from 18 November 1931. The station was elevated from November 2006. From 2006, the station became a stop on the Skyliner limited express train service. When the Skyliner moved to the Narita Sky Access Line in July 2010, Keisei Funabashi became a stop on the replacement Cityliner service between Ueno and Narita Airport (later truncated to Keisei-Narita). Since the timetable revision on 5 December 2015, the station has become a stop on the Morningliner and Eveningliner train services.

Station numbering was introduced to all Keisei Line stations on 17 July 2010. Keisei Funabashi was assigned station number KS22.

== Passenger statistics ==
In fiscal 2019, the station was used by an average of 20,709 passengers daily.

== Surrounding area ==
- Funabashi Station (JR Sōbu Main Line and Tōbu Urban Park Line)
- Funabashi FACE

== See also ==
- List of railway stations in Japan
