= Toei Subway rolling stock =

Passenger trains that run in the Toei Subway

The Asakusa Line, Mita Line and Shinjuku Line operate through services onto lines owned by other railway companies. The rolling stock listed below includes both trains owned by Toei Subway and trains operated by other railway companies on through services onto Toei Subway lines.

== Asakusa Line ==
Toei Asakusa Line trains are 18 m long 8-car formations, with three doors per side. They are also of standard gauge (1435mm) as opposed to the 1067mm gauge used on most Japanese rail lines.

=== Present ===
Toei

- Toei 5500 series (since June 2018)

Keisei Electric Railway, Hokusō Railway, Chiba New Town Railway and Shibayama Railway

- Keisei 3000 series (II) (since 2003)
- Keisei 3050 series (II) (since 2010)
- Keisei 3100 series (II) (since 26 October 2019)
- Keisei 3400 series (since 1993)
- Keisei 3600 series (since 1982)
- Keisei 3700 series (since 1991)
- Hokuso 7300 series (since 1991)
- Hokuso 7500 series (since 2006)
- Chiba New Town Railway 9100 series "C-flyer" (since 1994)
- Chiba New Town Railway 9200 series (since 2013)
- Chiba New Town Railway 9800 series (since 21 March 2017)

Keikyu Corporation

- Keikyu 1500 series (since 1985)
- Keikyu 600 series (since 1994)
- Keikyu N1000 series (since 2002)
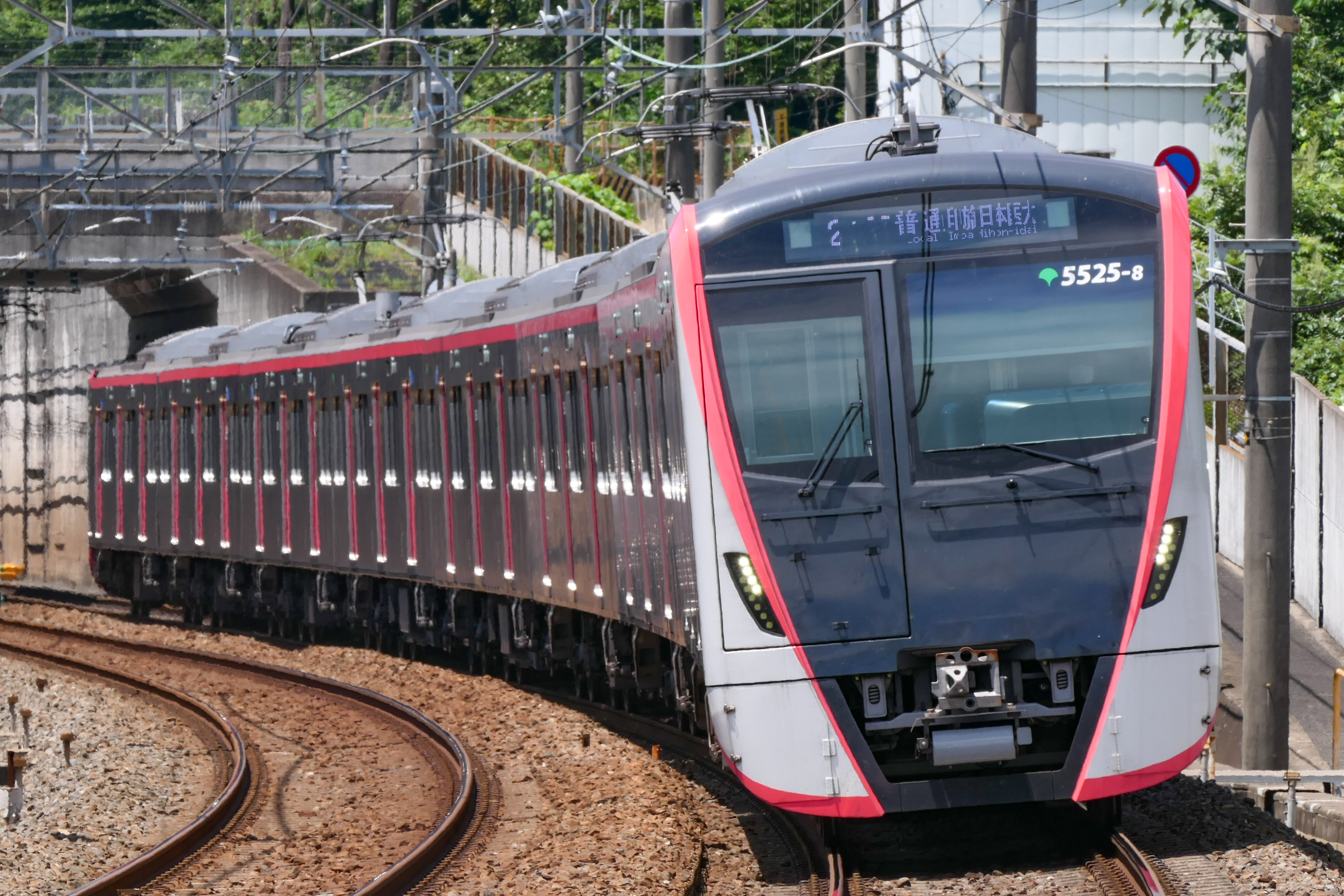
Toei 5500 series

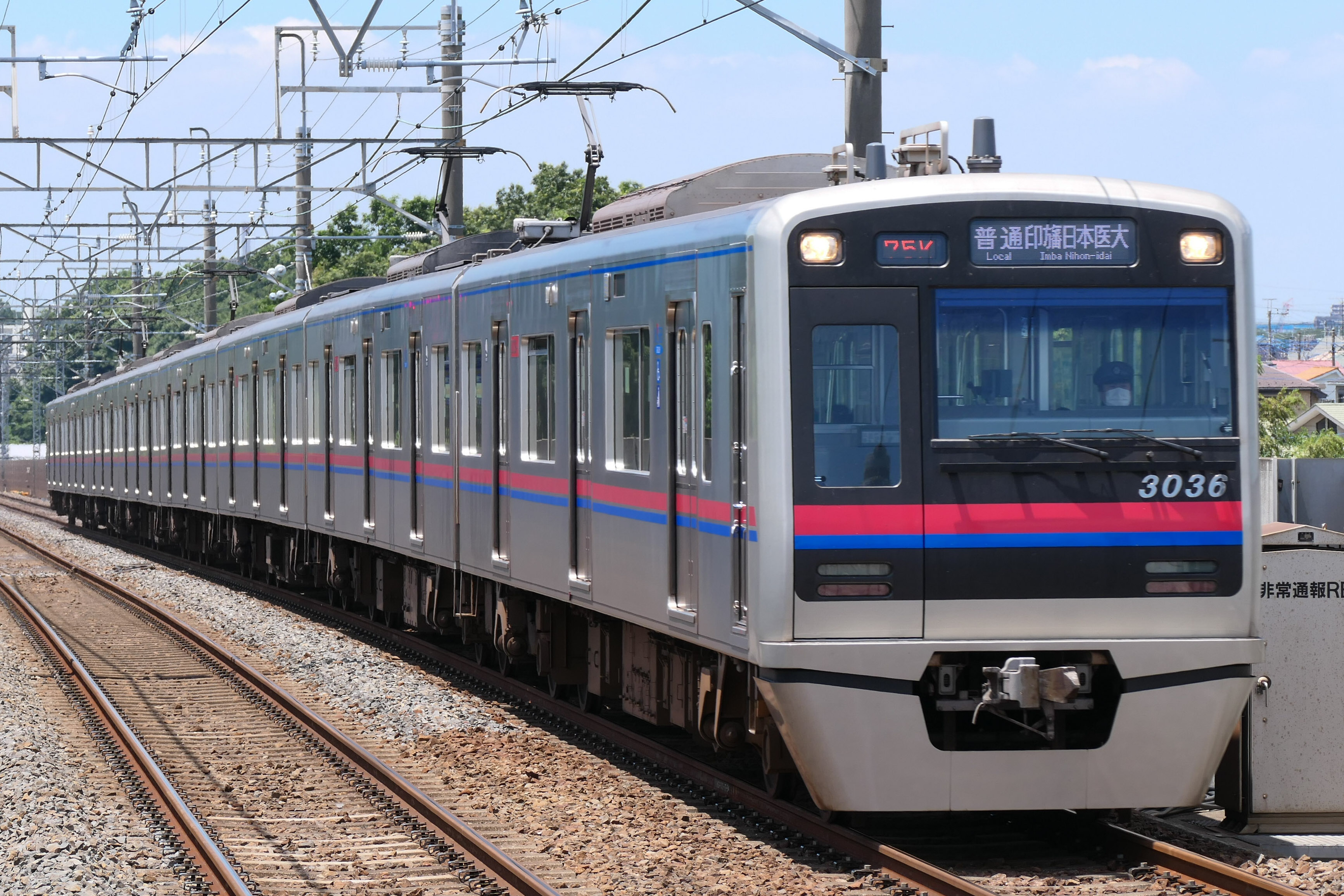
Keisei 3000 series (II)

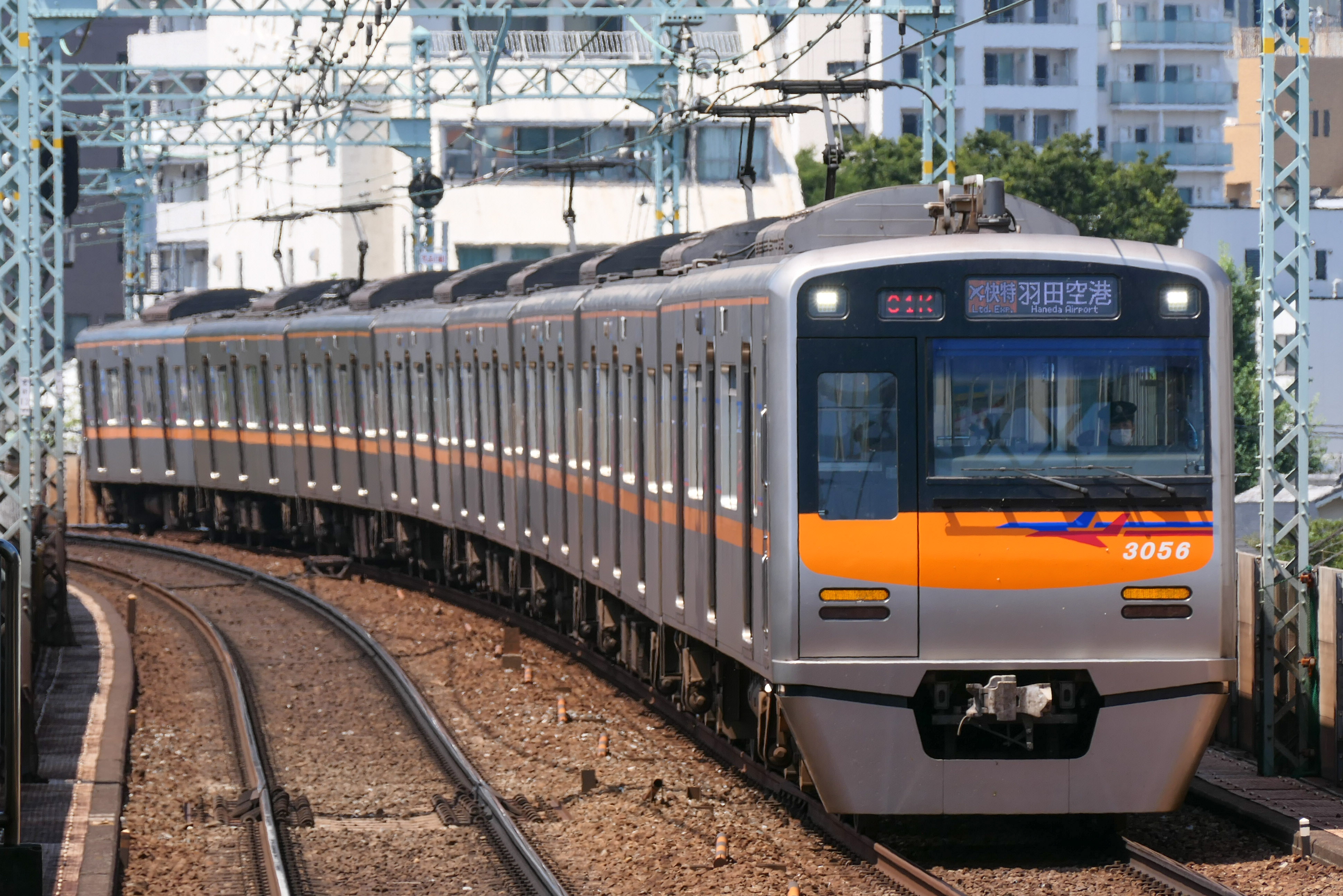
Keisei 3050 series (II)

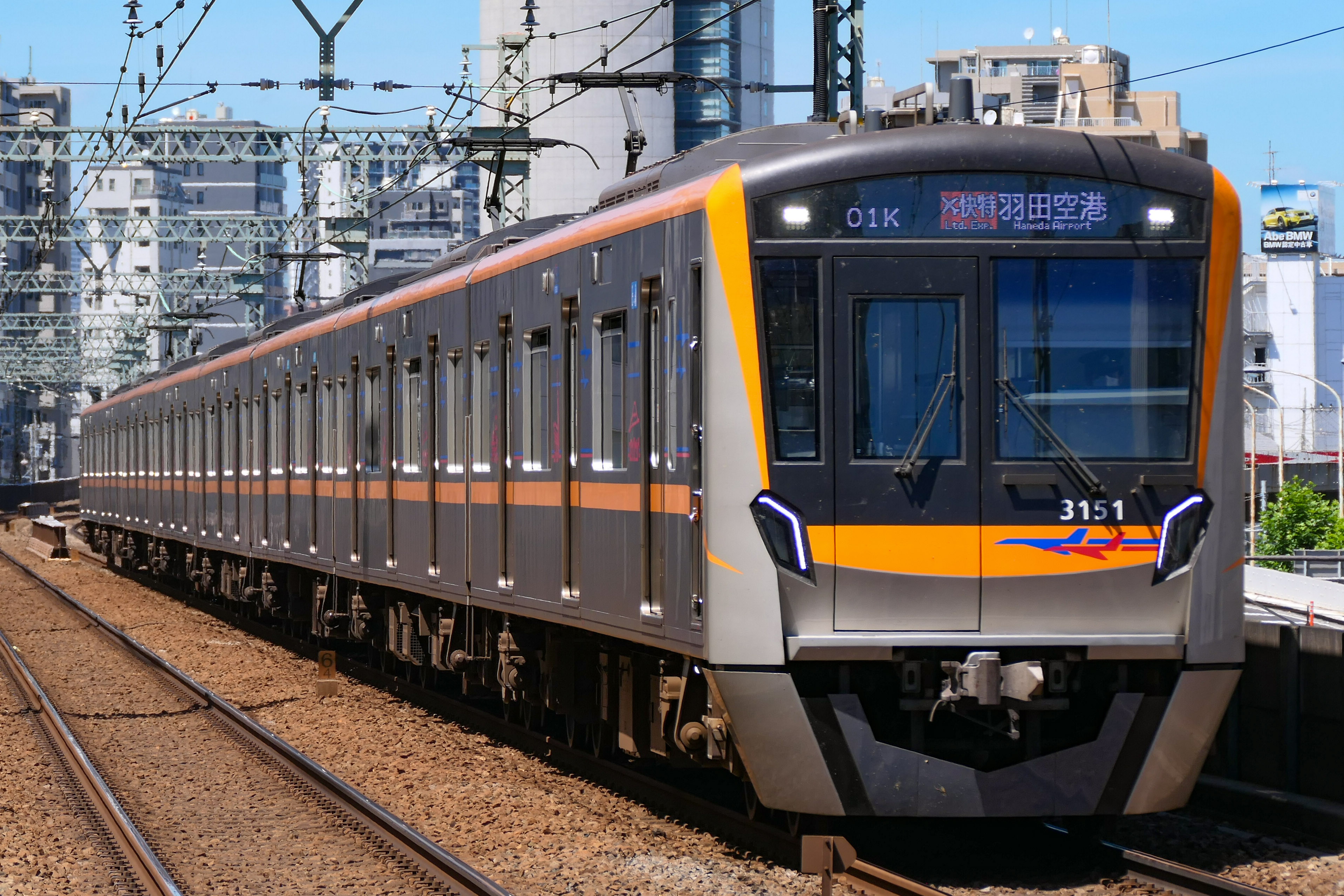
Keisei 3100 series (II)

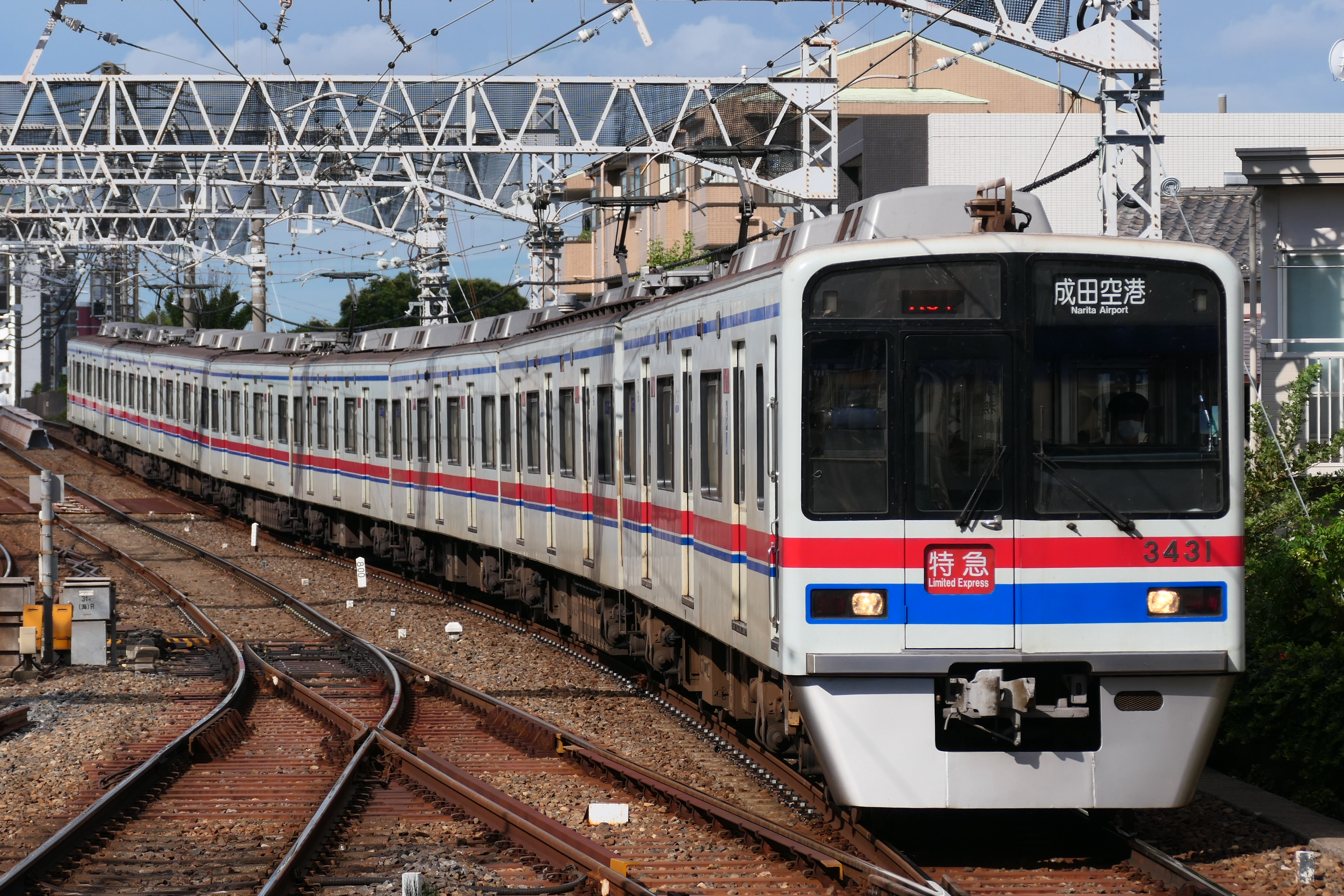
Keisei 3400 series

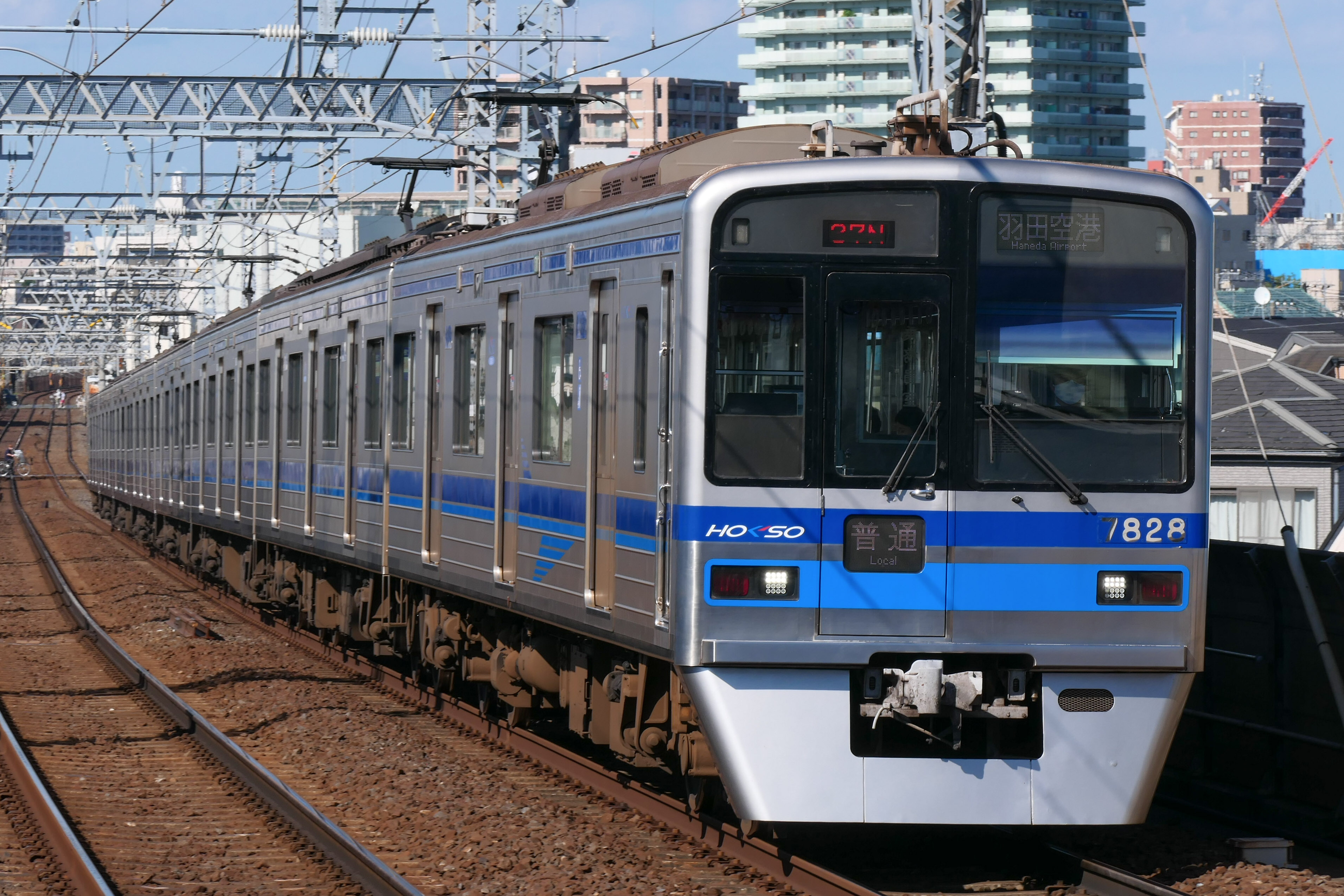
Hokuso 7300 series

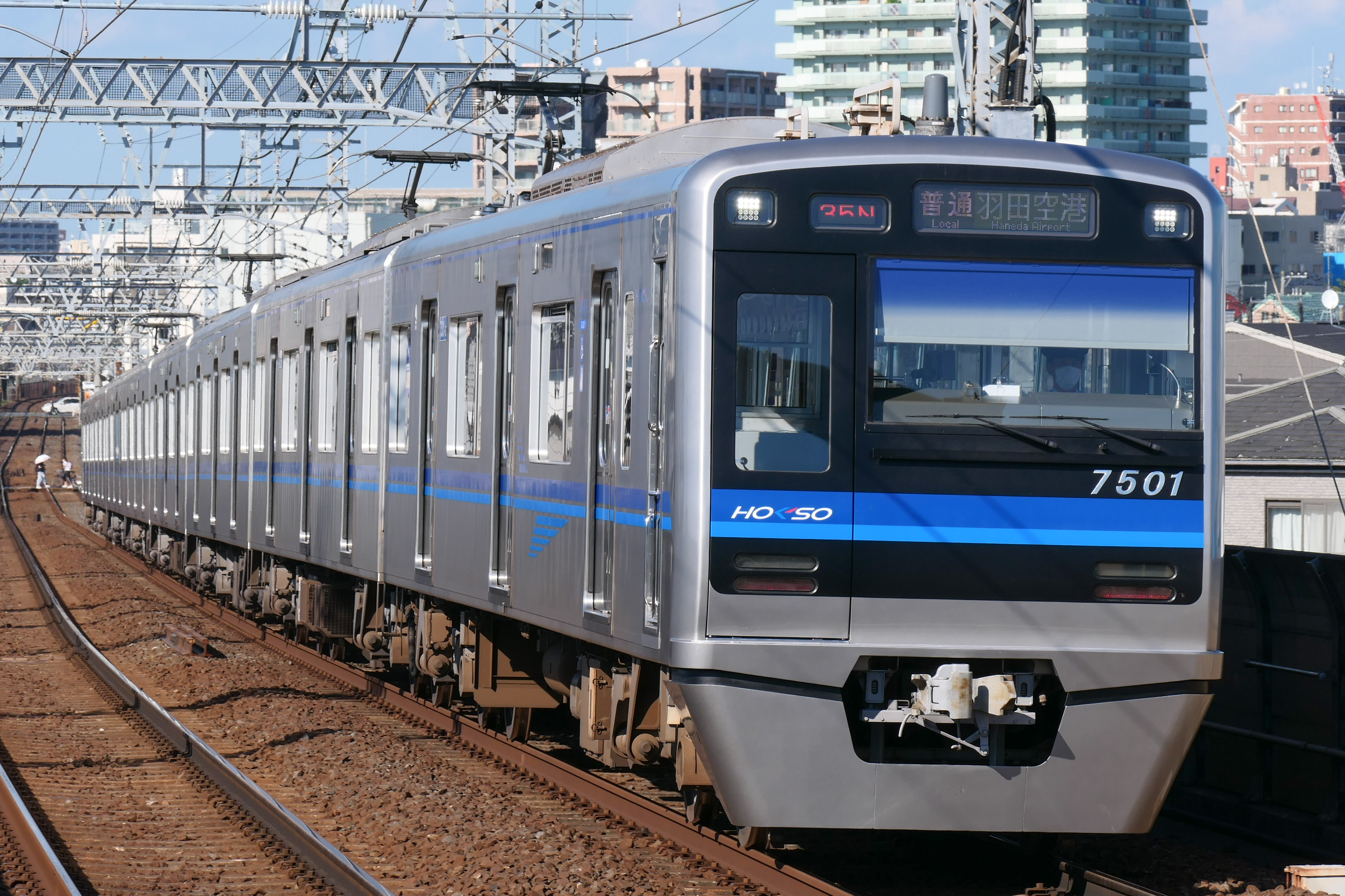
Hokuso 7500 series

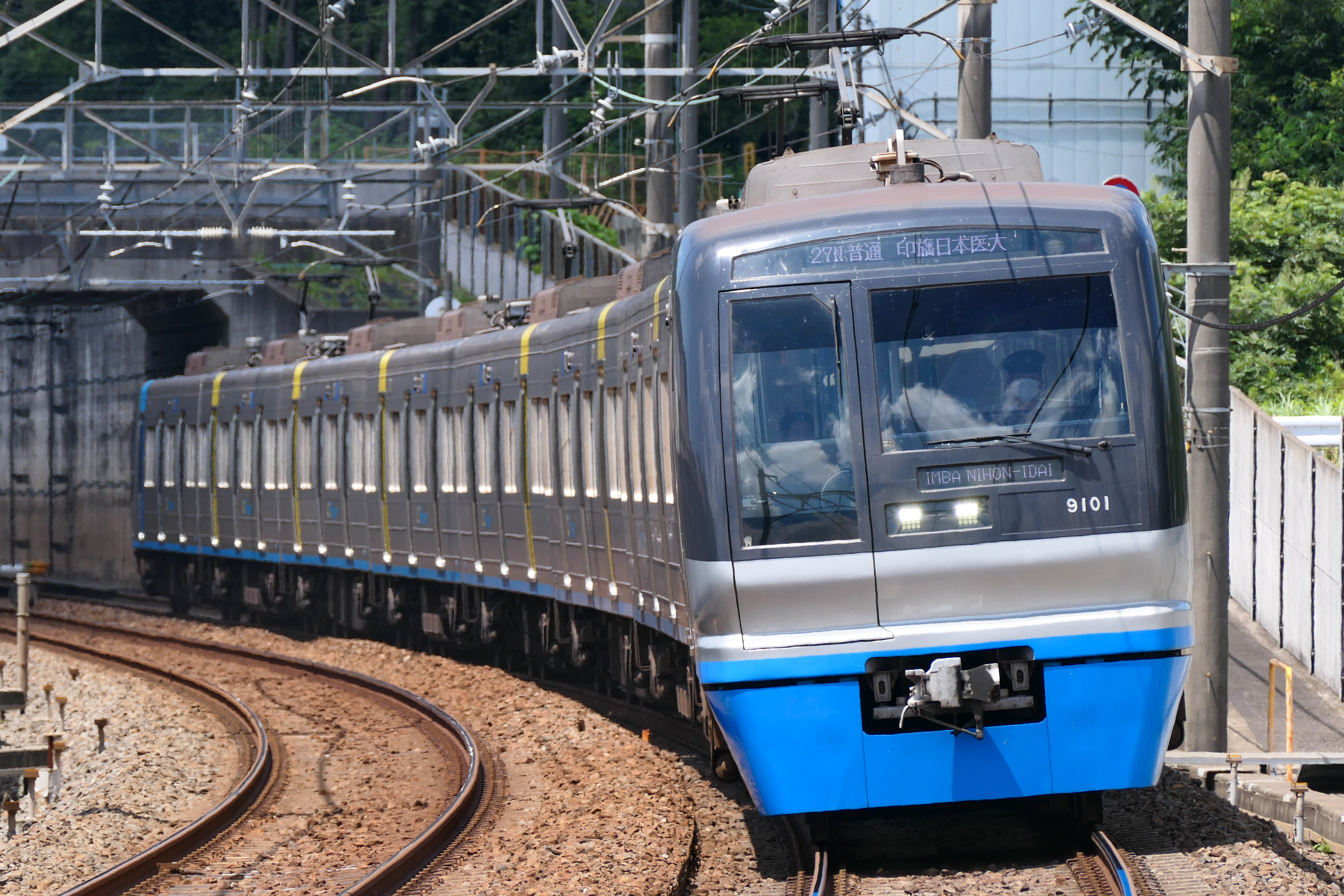
Chiba New Town Railway 9100 series "C-flyer"

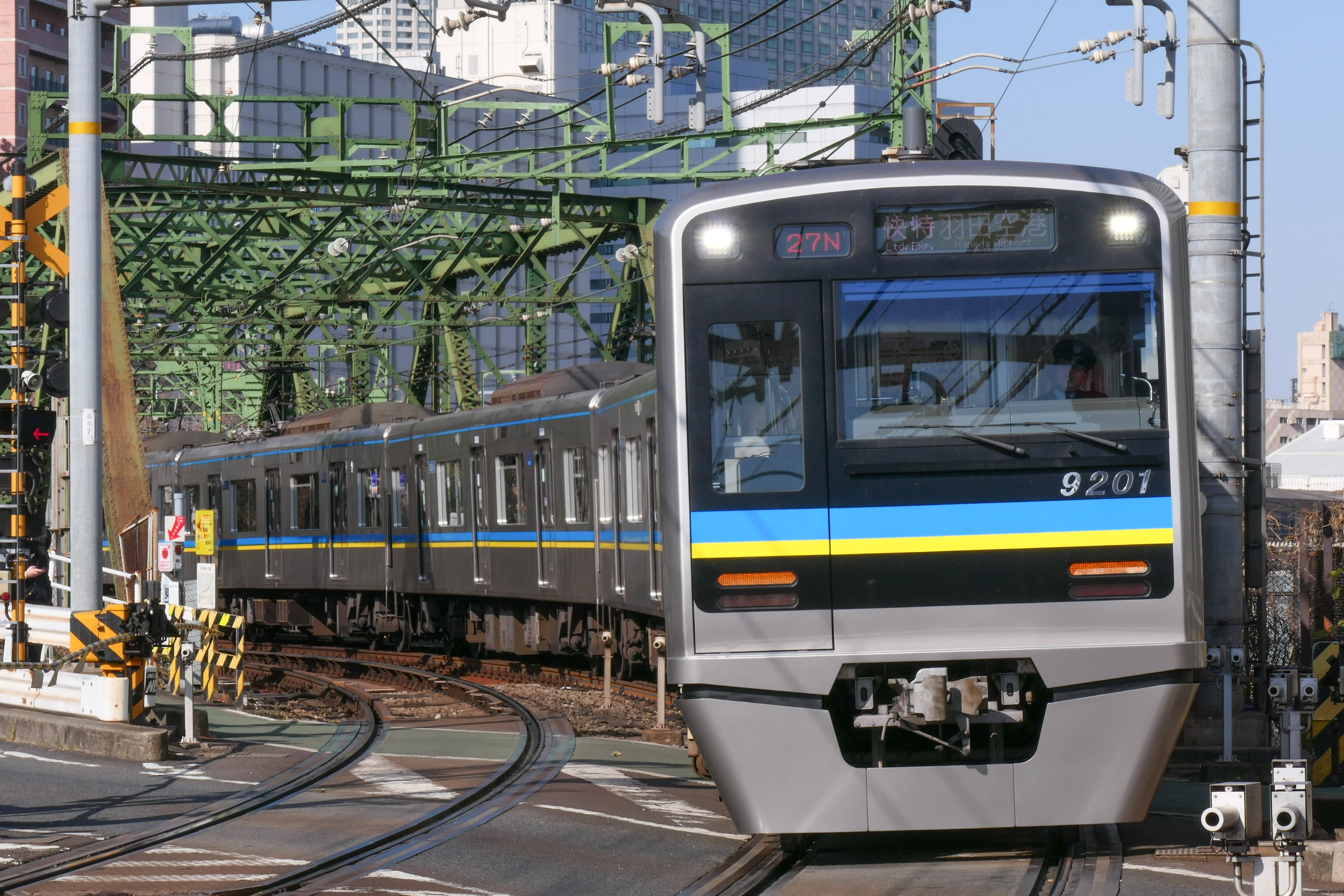
Chiba New Town Railway 9200 series

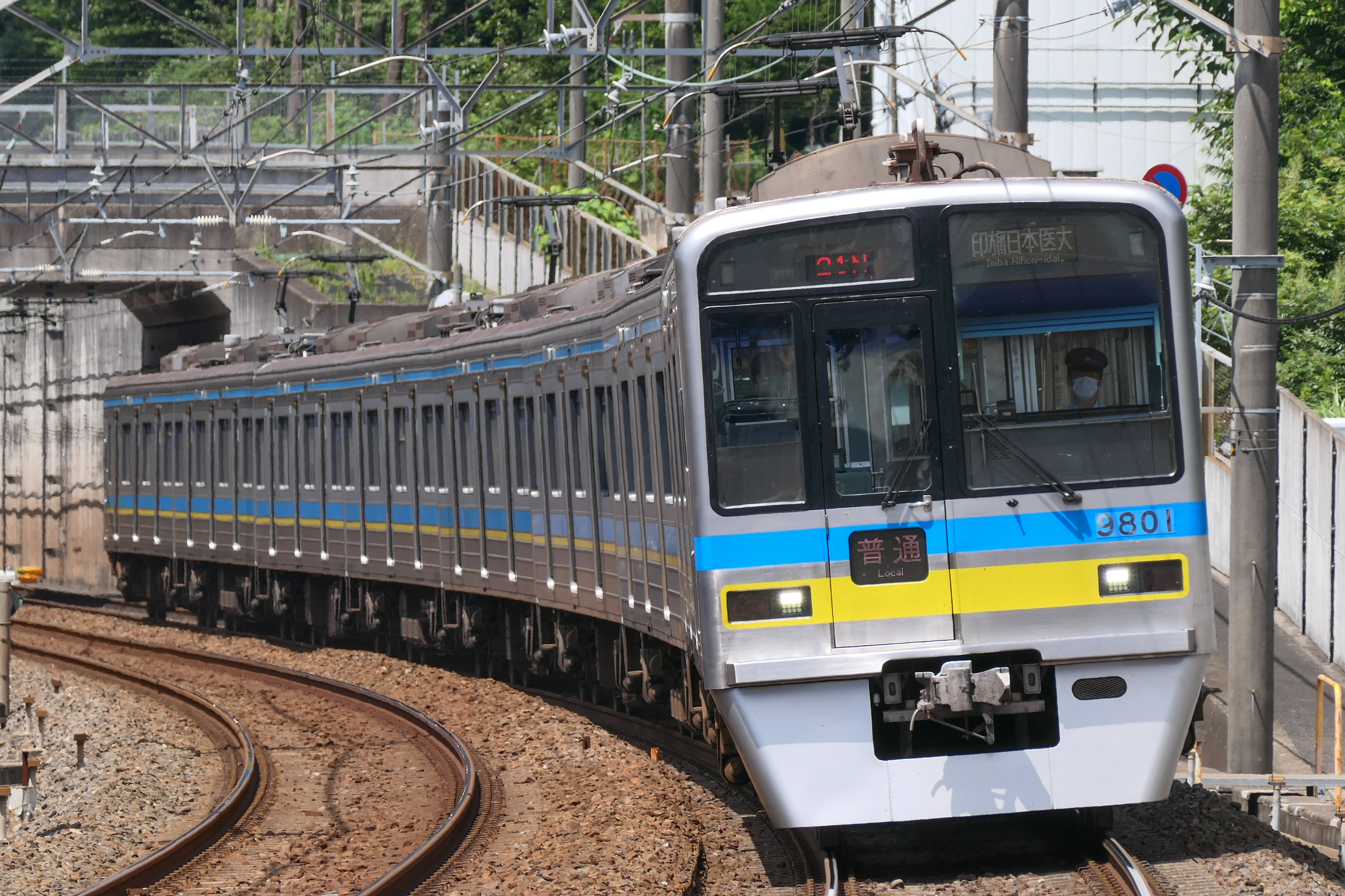
Chiba New Town Railway 9800 series

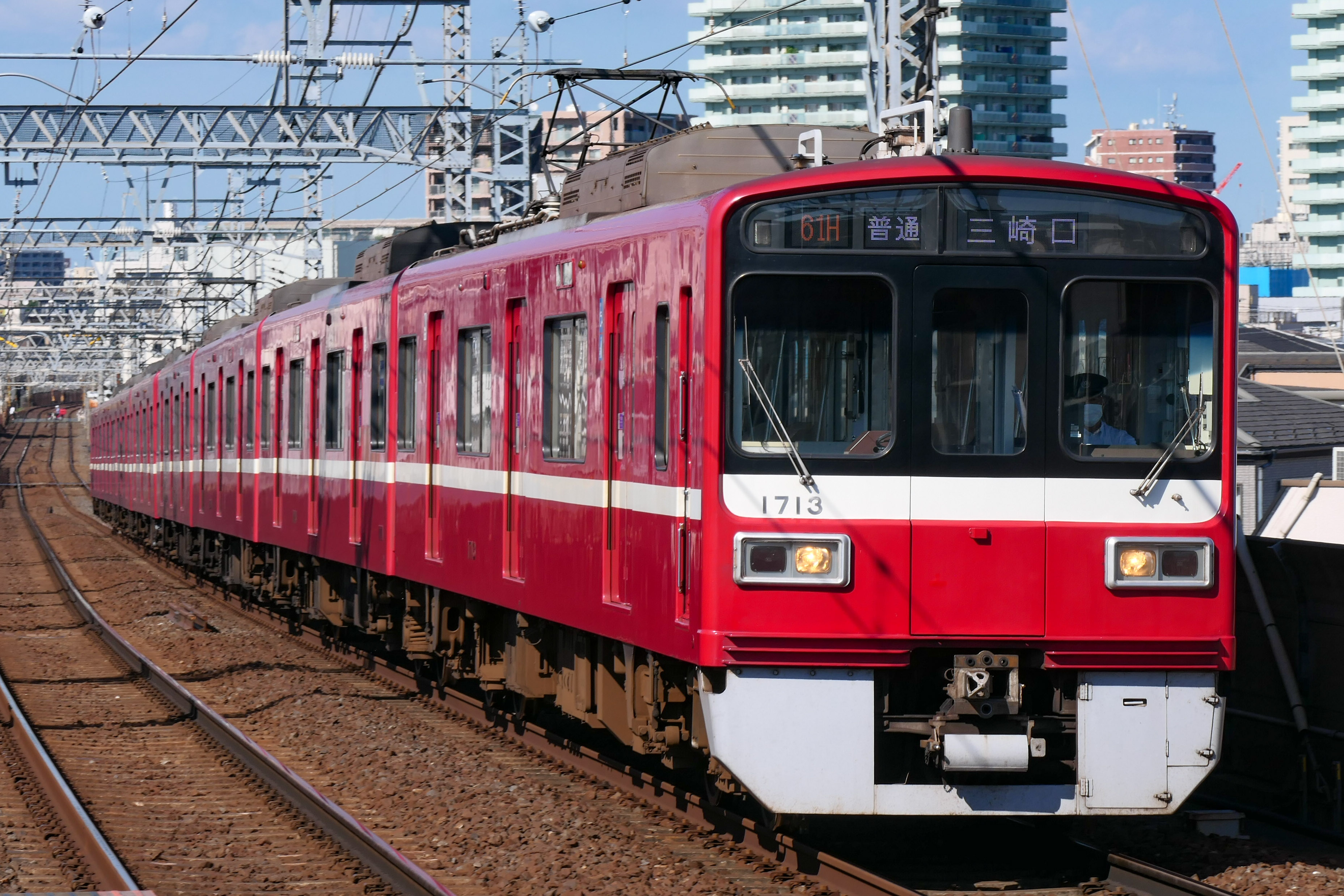
Keikyu 1500 series

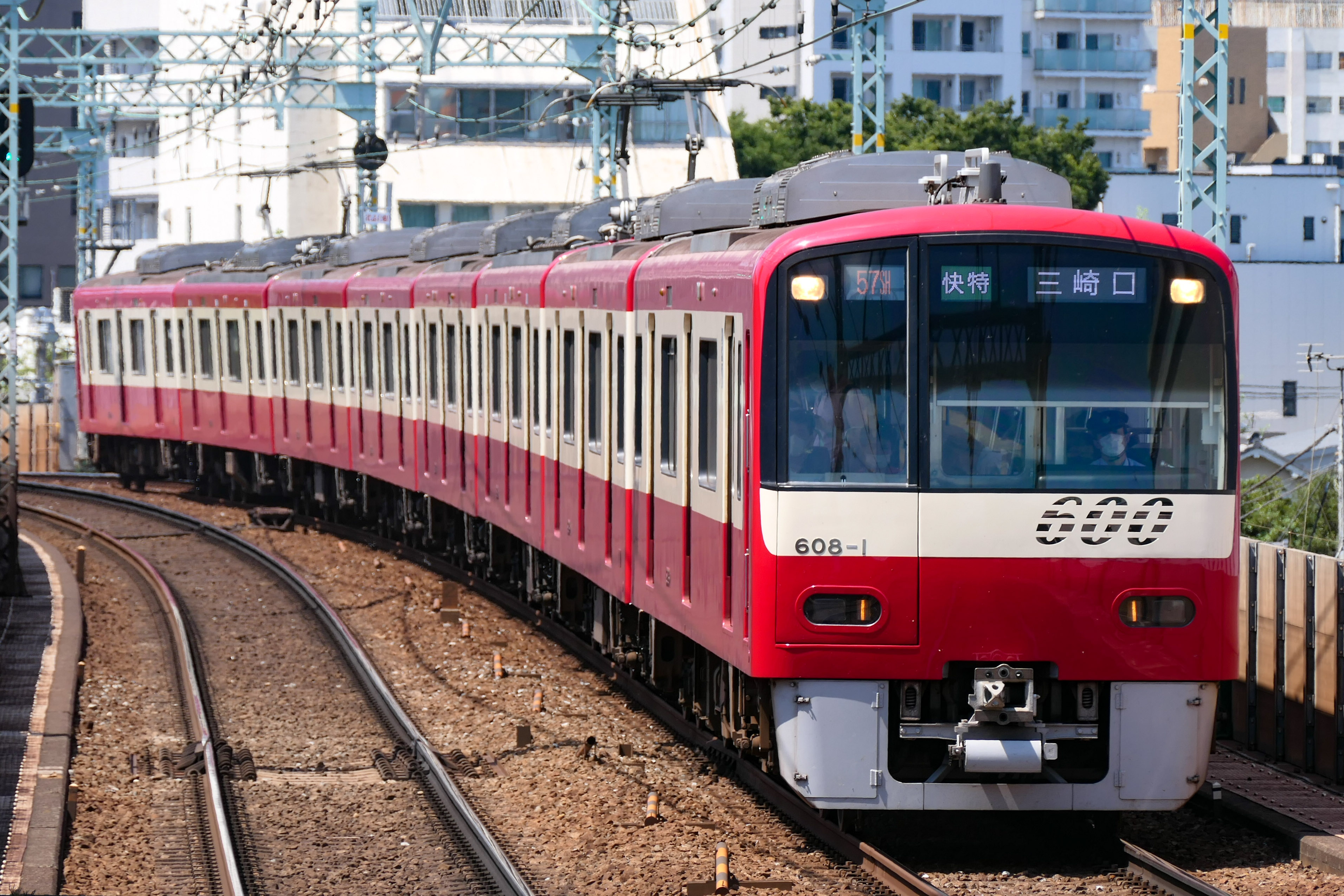
Keikyu 600 series

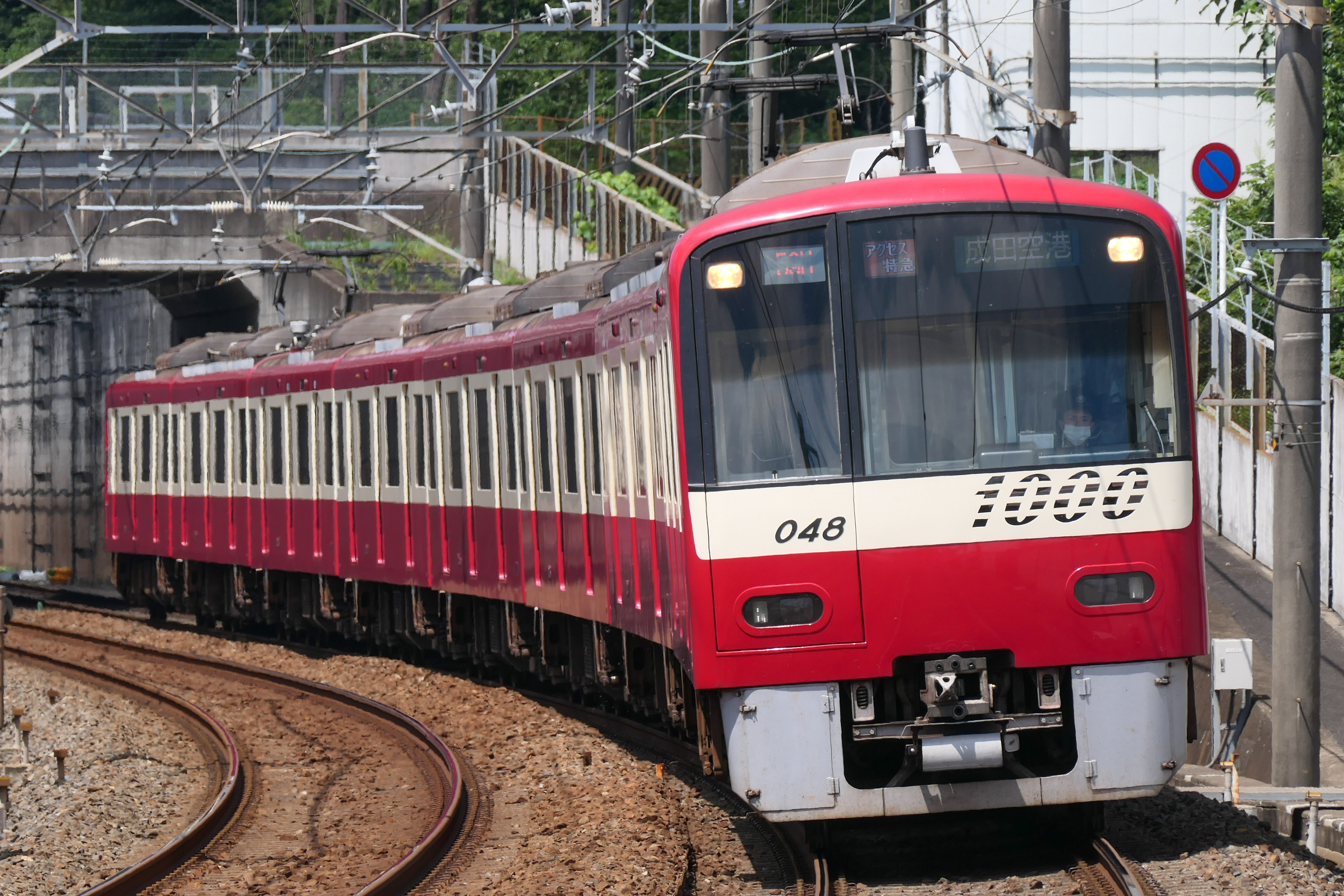
Keikyu N1000 series (aluminium body)

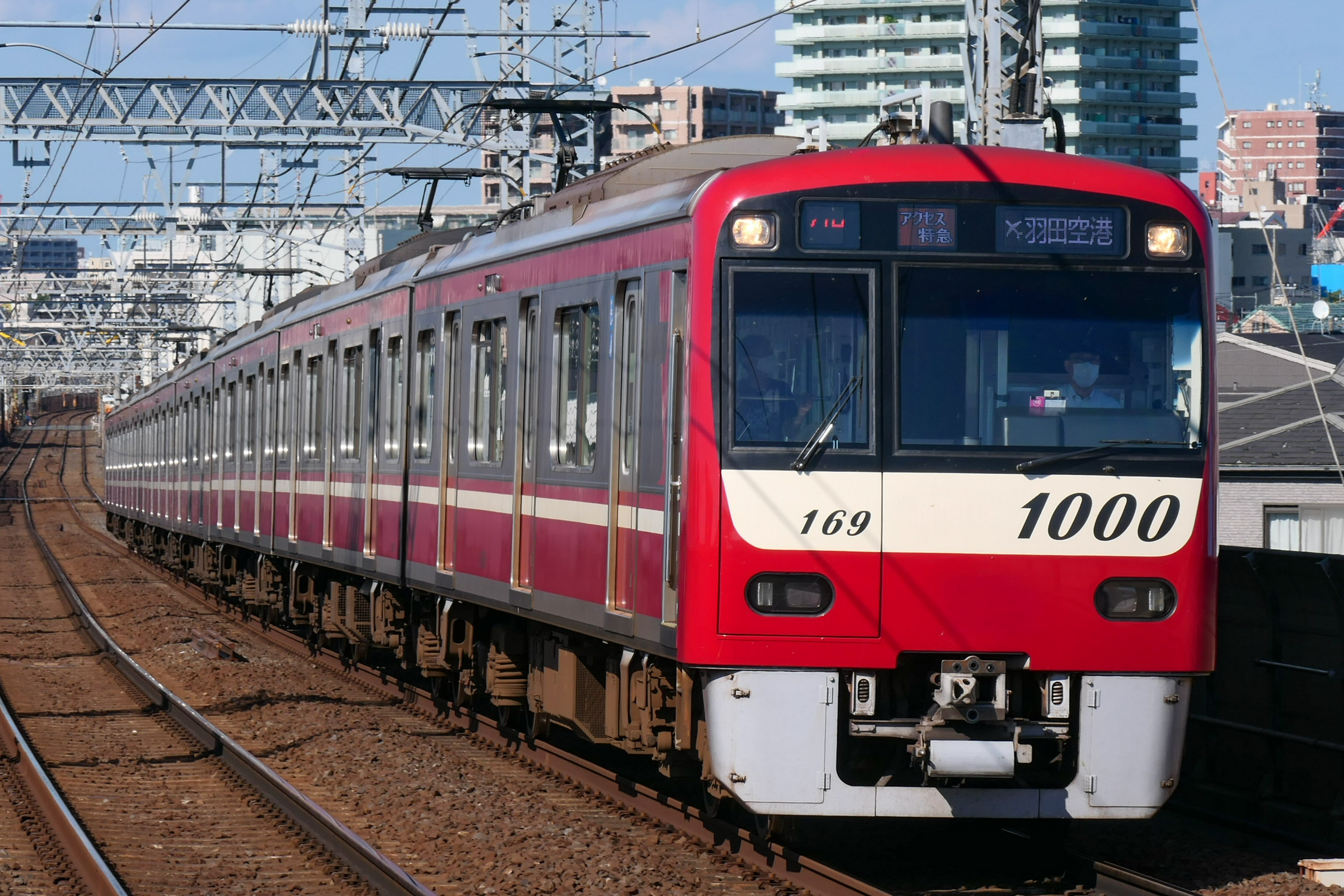
Keikyu N1000 series (stainless steel body)

=== Former ===
Toei

- Toei 5000 series (from 1960 until 1995)
- Toei 5200 series (from 1976 until 2006)
- Toei 5300 series (from 1991 until February 2023)

Keisei Electric Railway, Hokusō Railway, Chiba New Town Railway and Shibayama Railway

- Keisei 1000 series (from 1988 until 1991)
- Keisei 3000 series (I) (from 1960 until 1991)
- Keisei 3050 series (I) (from 1960 until 1993)
- Keisei 3100 series (I) (until 1995)
- Keisei 3150 series (until 1998)
- Keisei 3200 series (until 2007)
- Keisei 3300 series (until 2008)
- Keisei 3500 series (from 1972 until 2015)
- Keisei 3600 series (from 1982 until 2020)
- Hokuso 7050 series (from 1995 until 2003)
- Hokuso 7150 series (from 1991 until 1997)
- Hokuso 7000 series (from 1991 until 2007)
- Hokuso 7250 series (from 2003 until 2006)
- Hokuso 7260 series (from 2006 until 2015)
- Chiba New Town Railway 9000 series (from 1991 until 2017)
- Shibayama Railway 3600 series (from 2002 until 2013)

Keikyu Corporation

- Keikyu 1000 series (from 1968 until 2008)
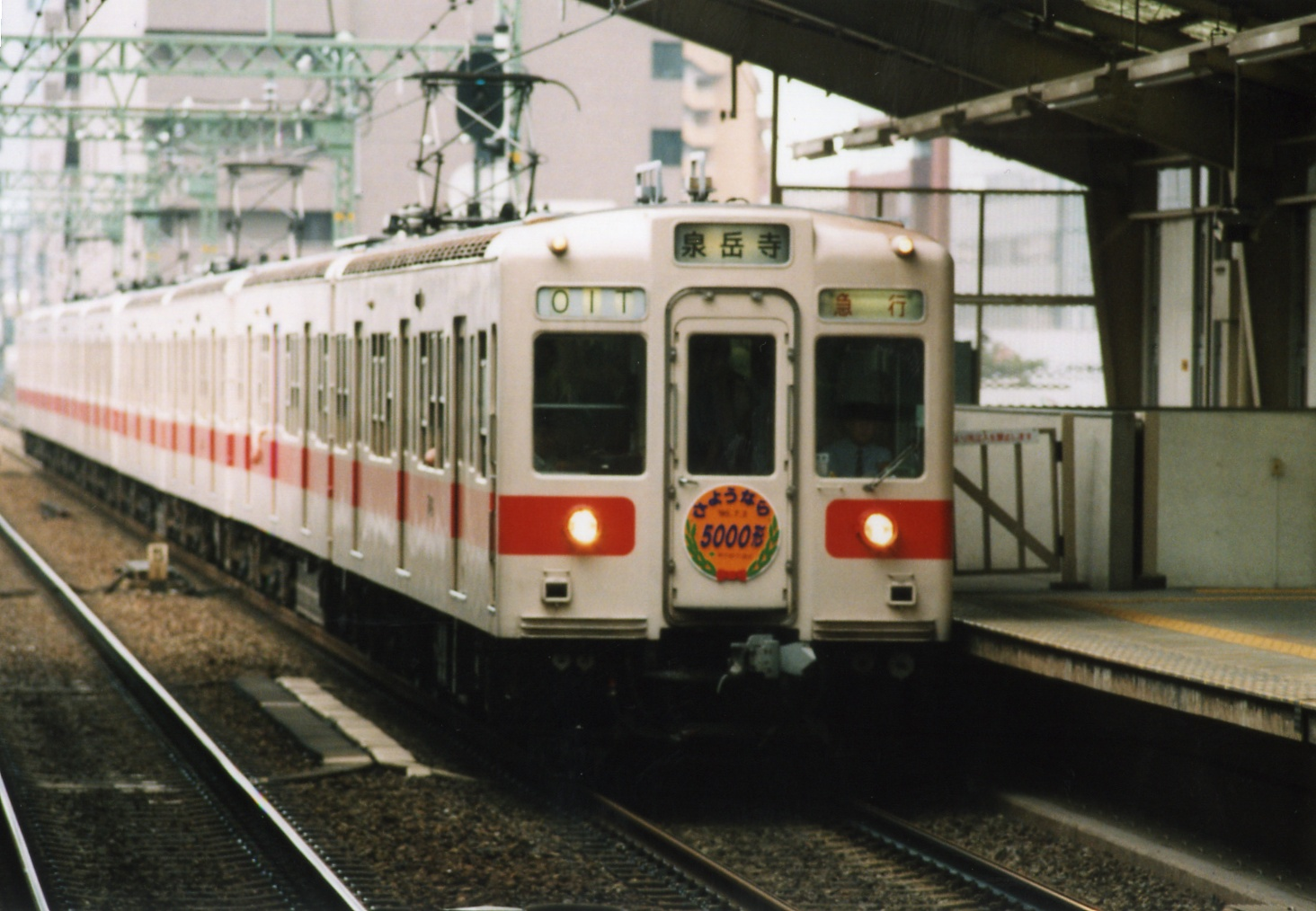
Toei 5000 series

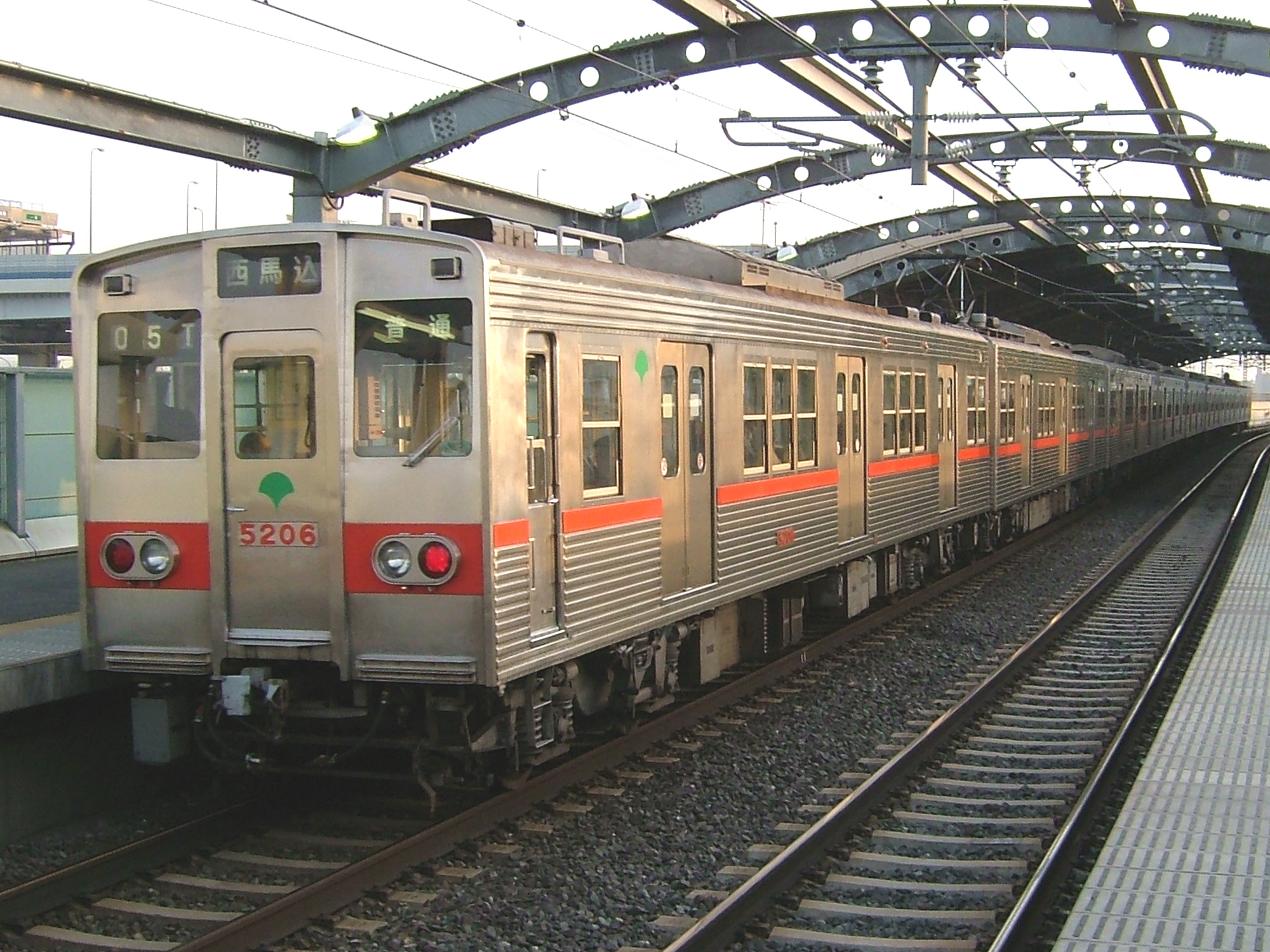
Toei 5200 series

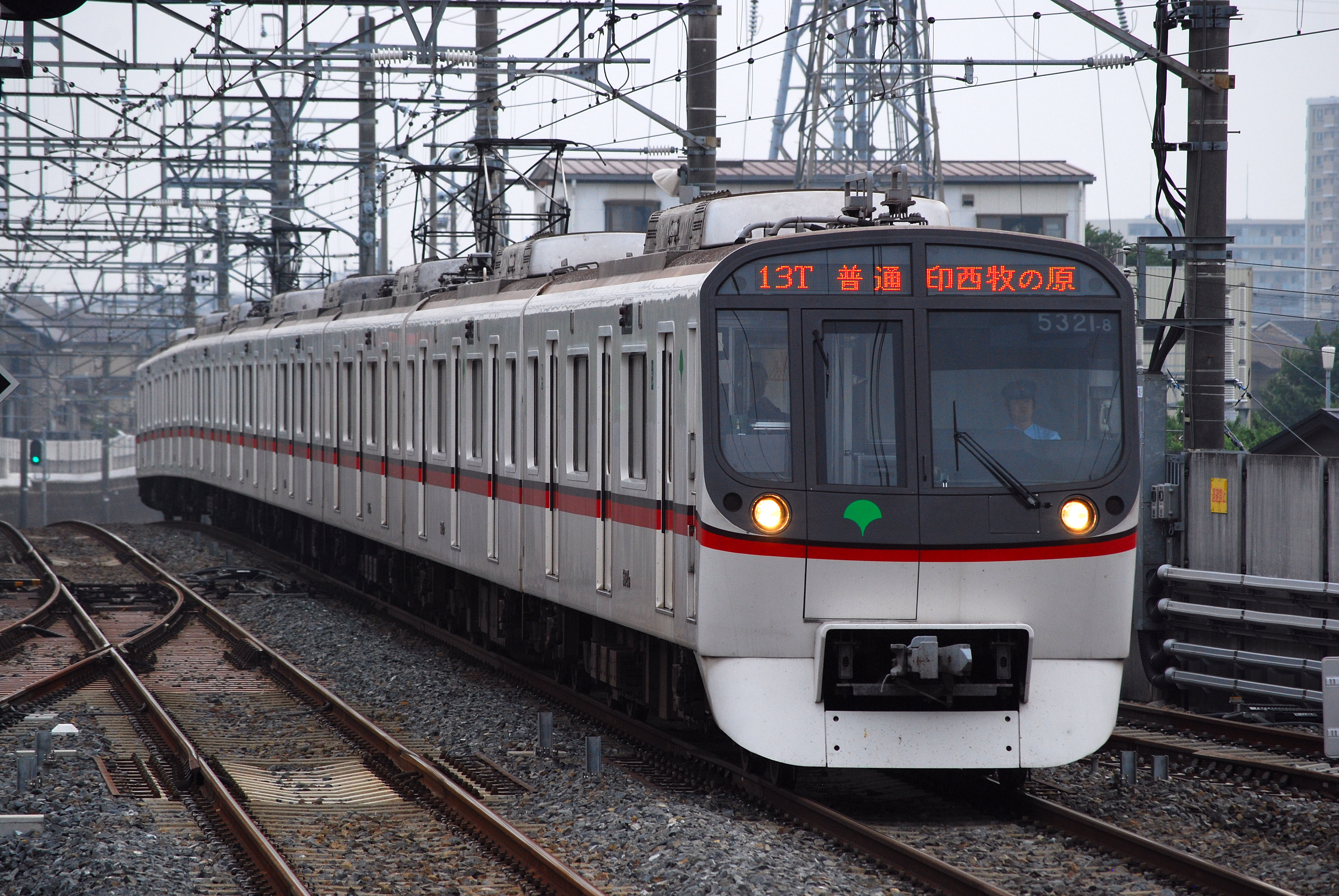
Toei 5300 series

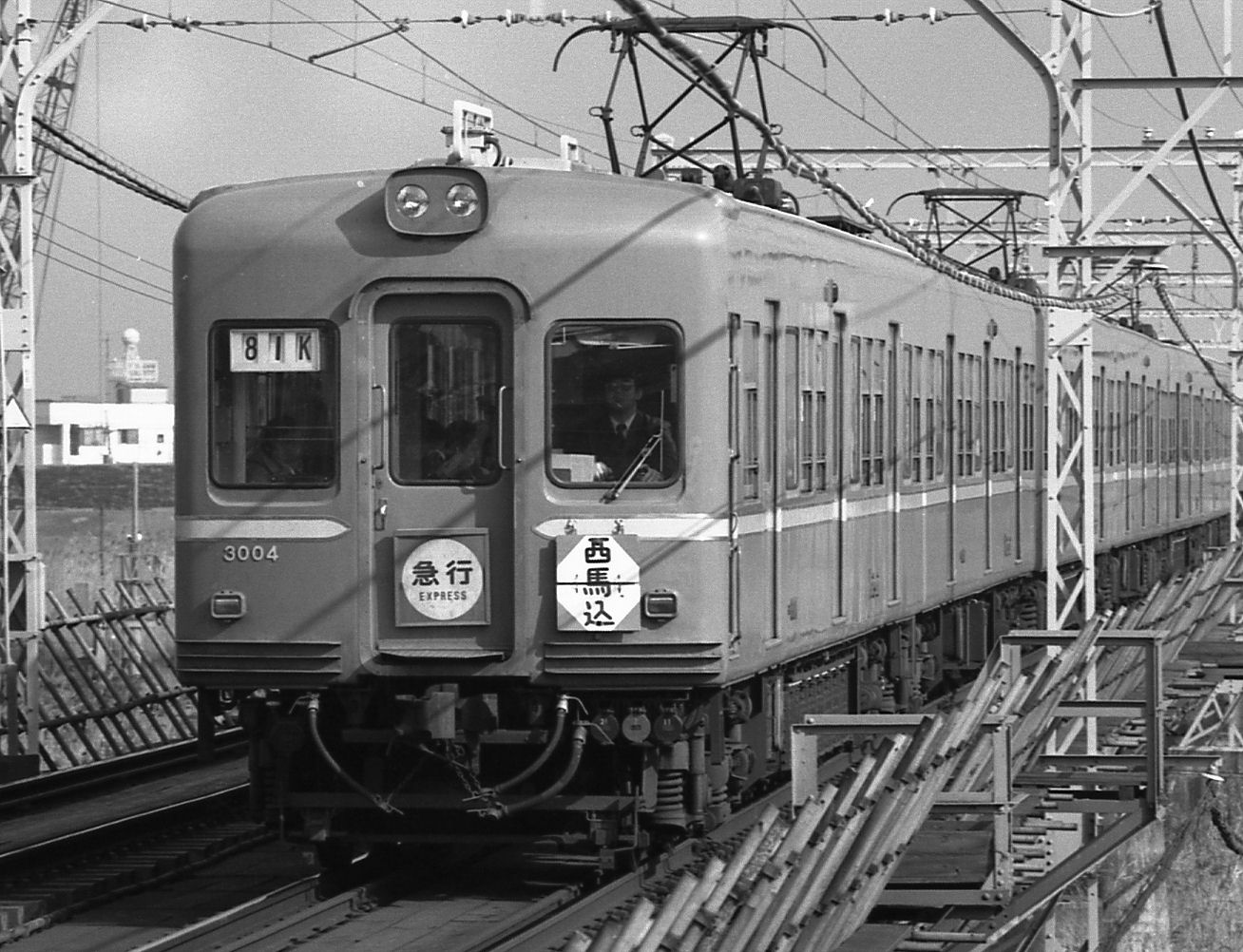
Keisei 3000 series (I)

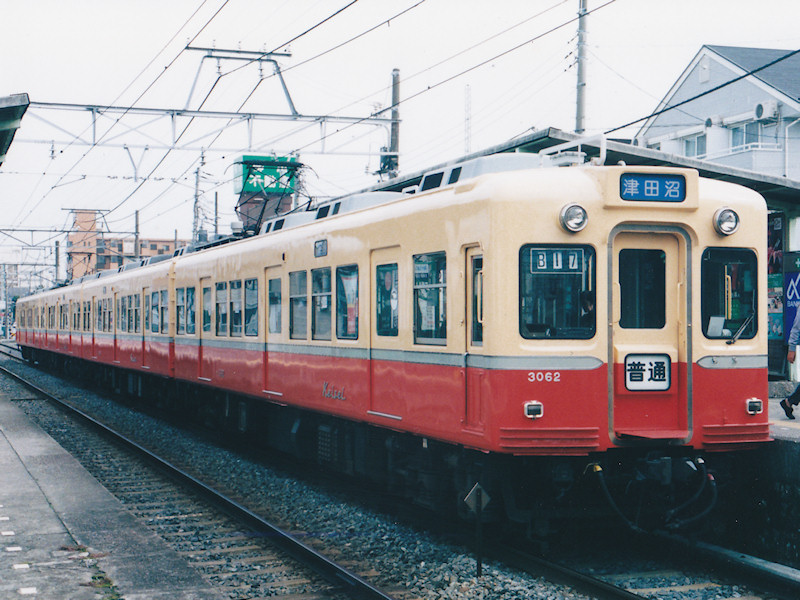
Keisei 3050 series (I)

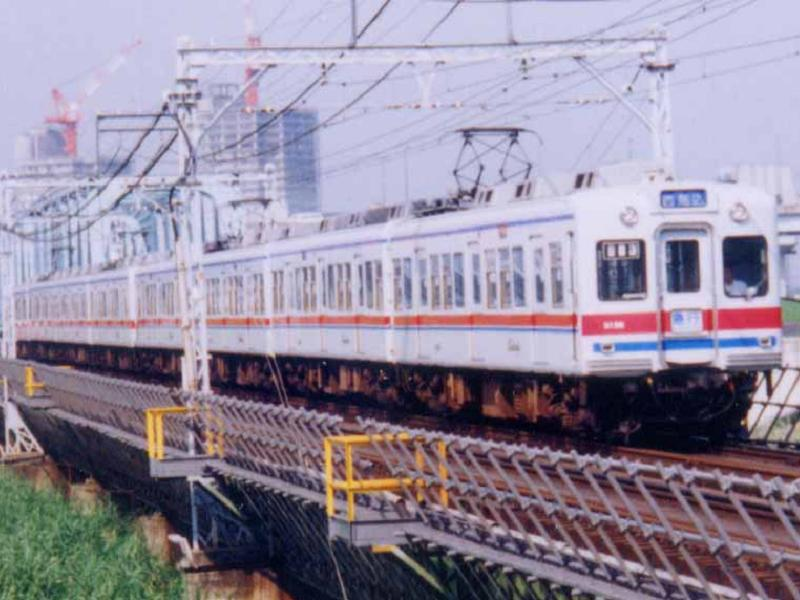
Keisei 3100 series (I)

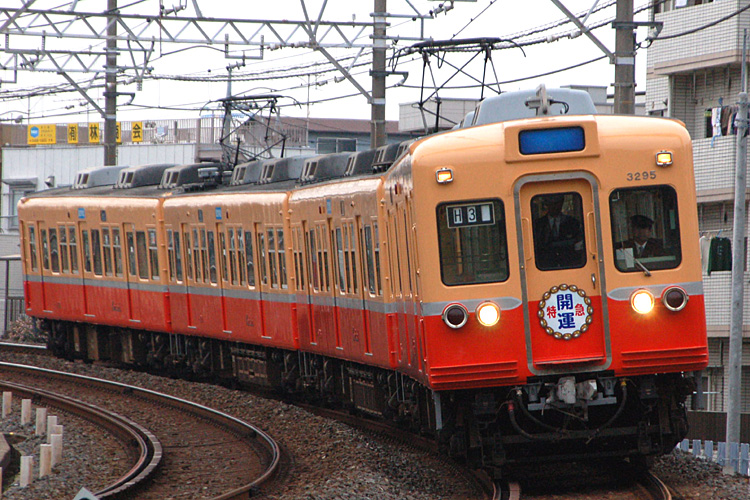
Keisei 3200 series

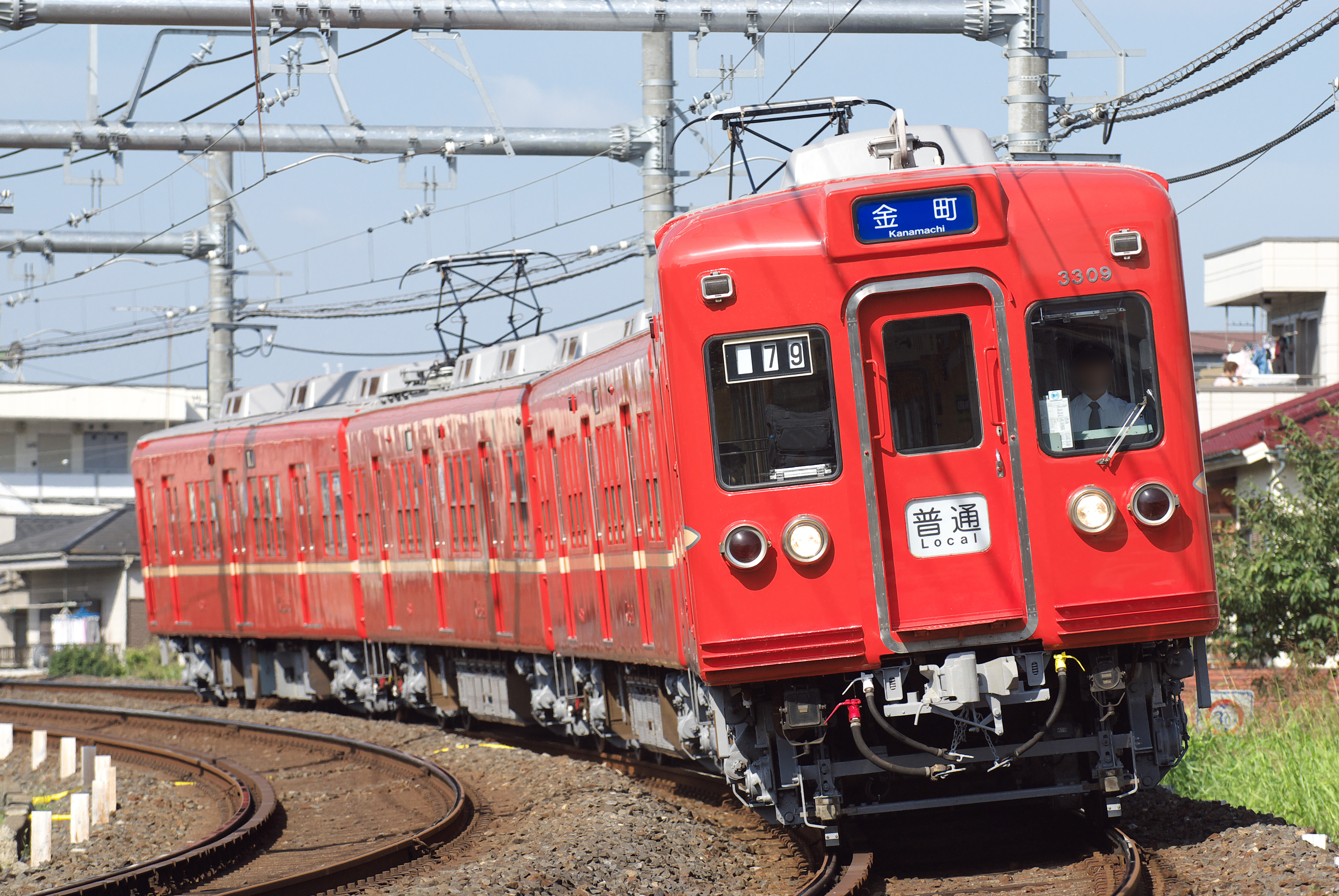
Keisei 3300 series

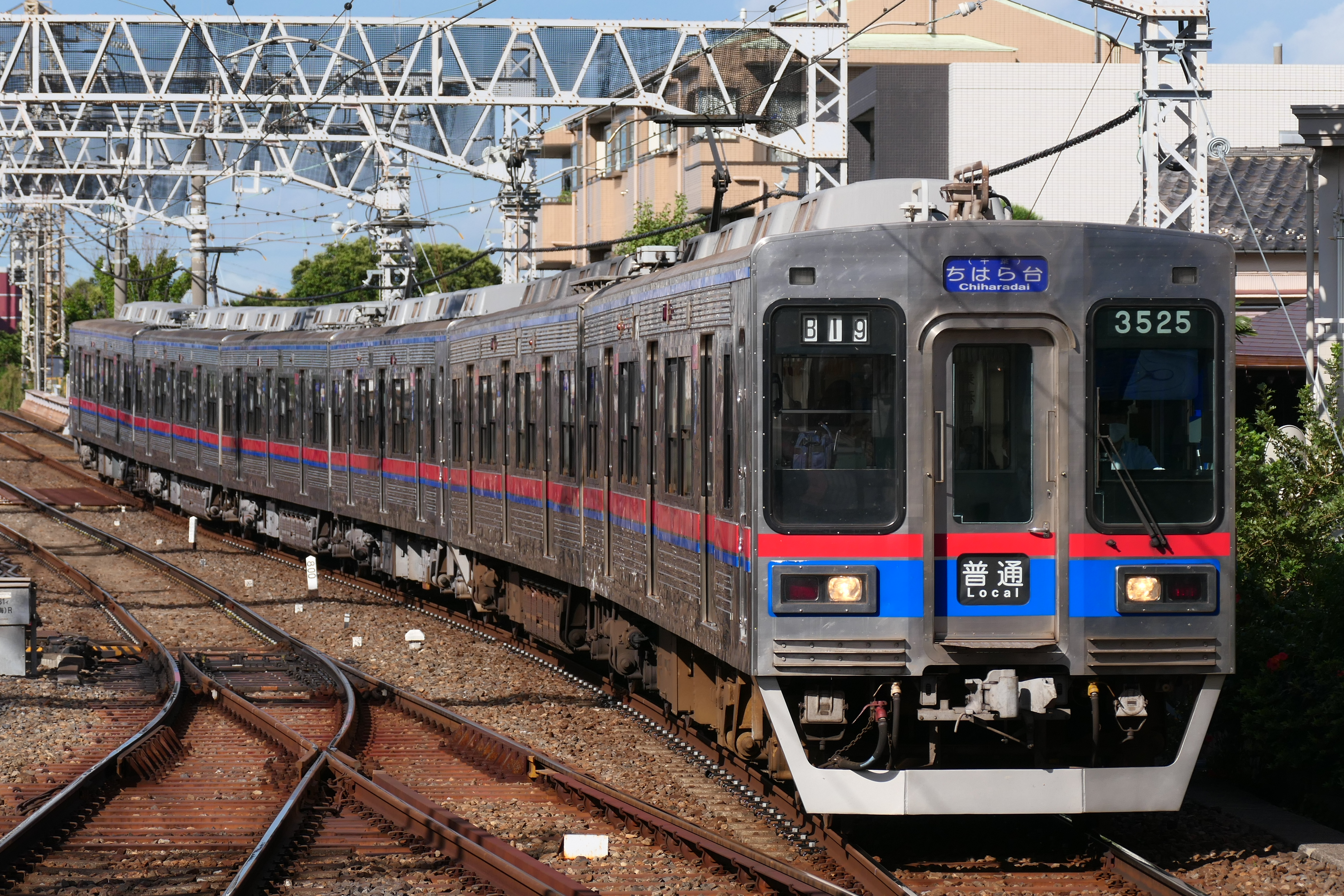
Keisei 3500 series

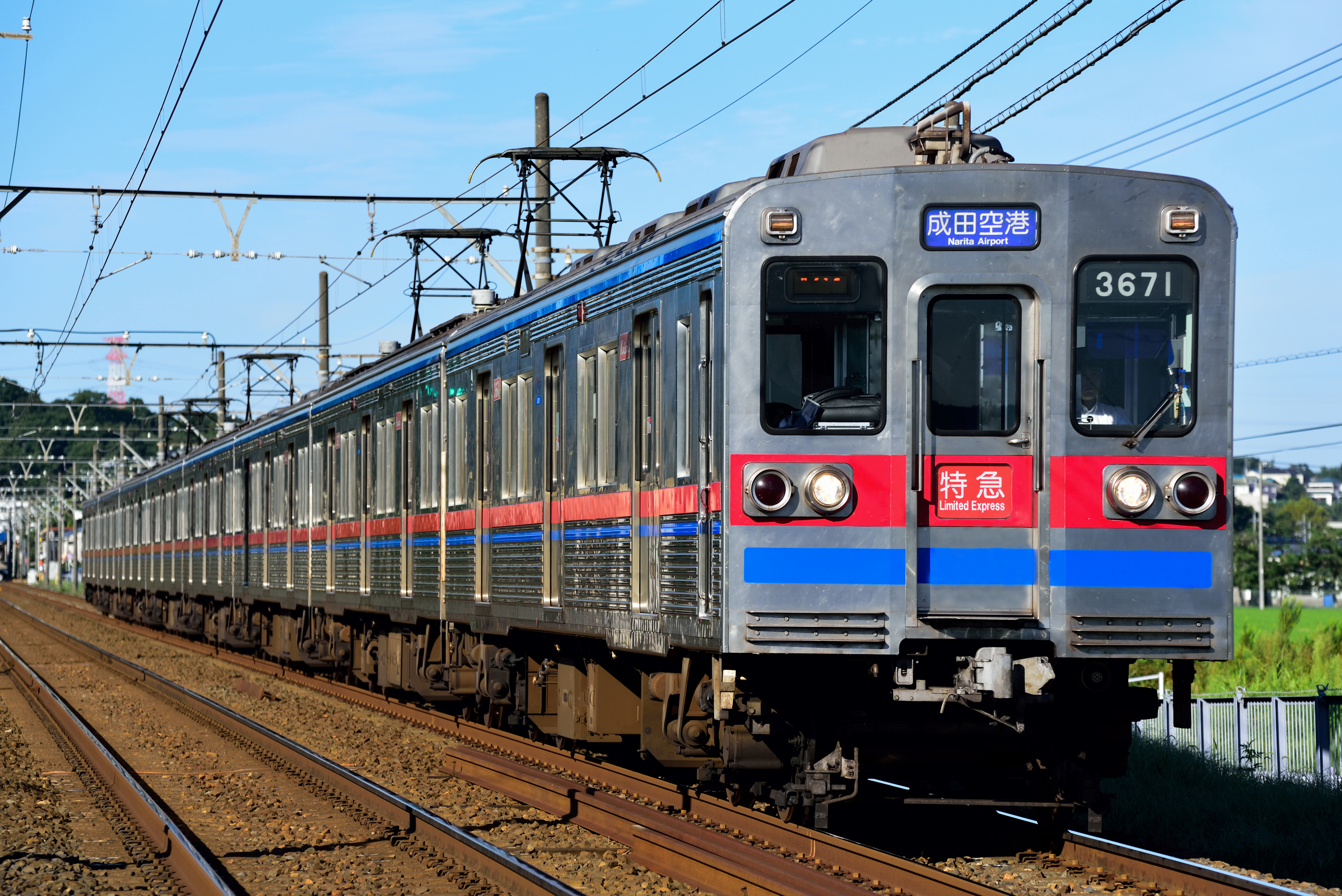
Keisei 3600 series

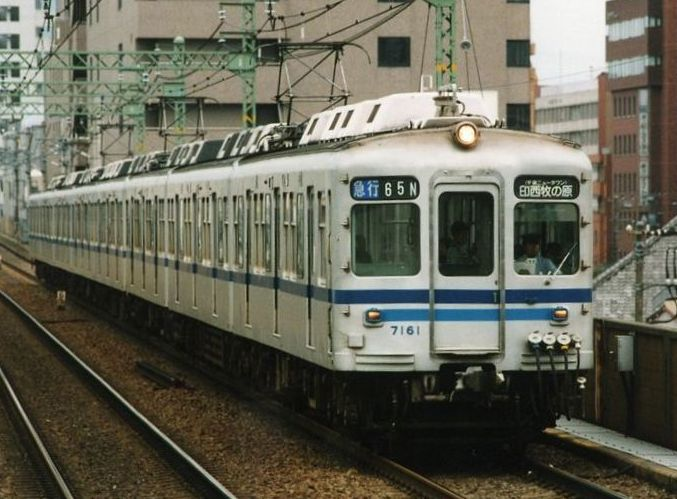
Hokuso 7150 series

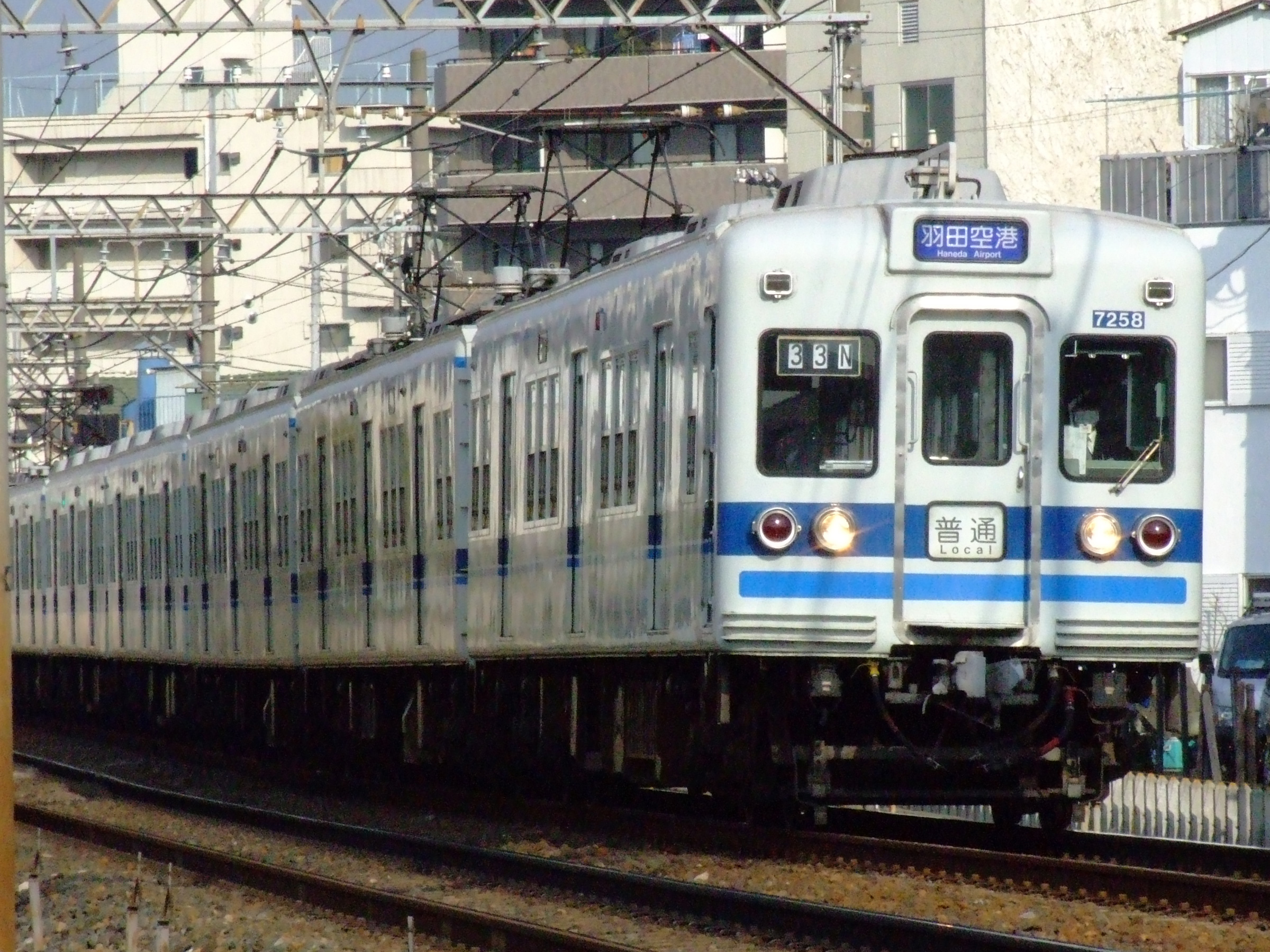
Hokuso 7250 series

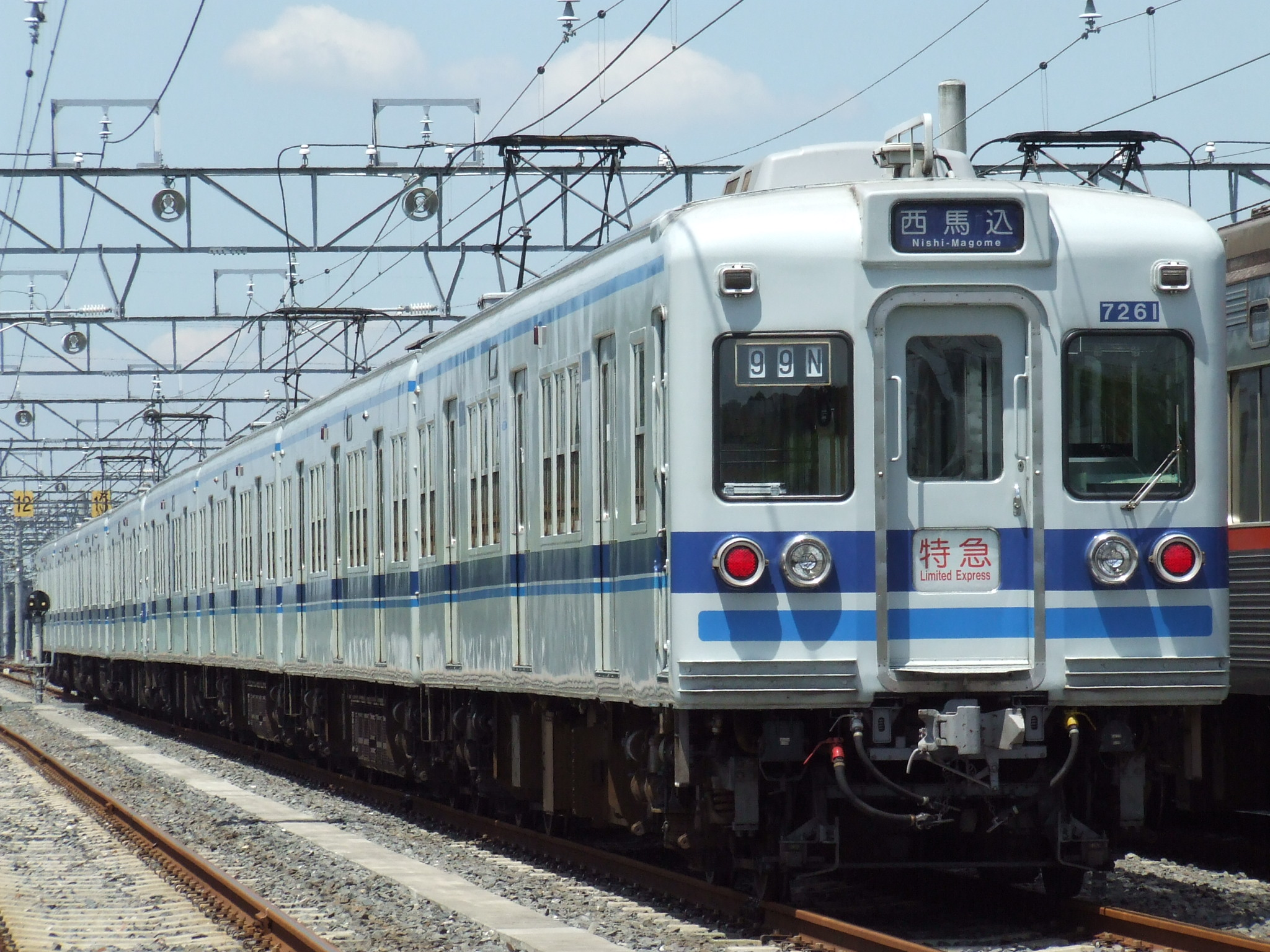
Hokuso 7260 series

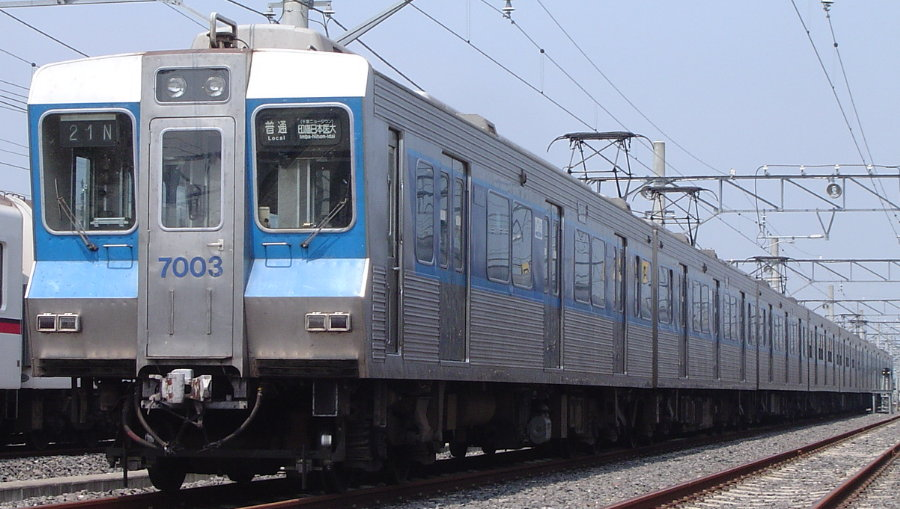
Hokuso 7000 series

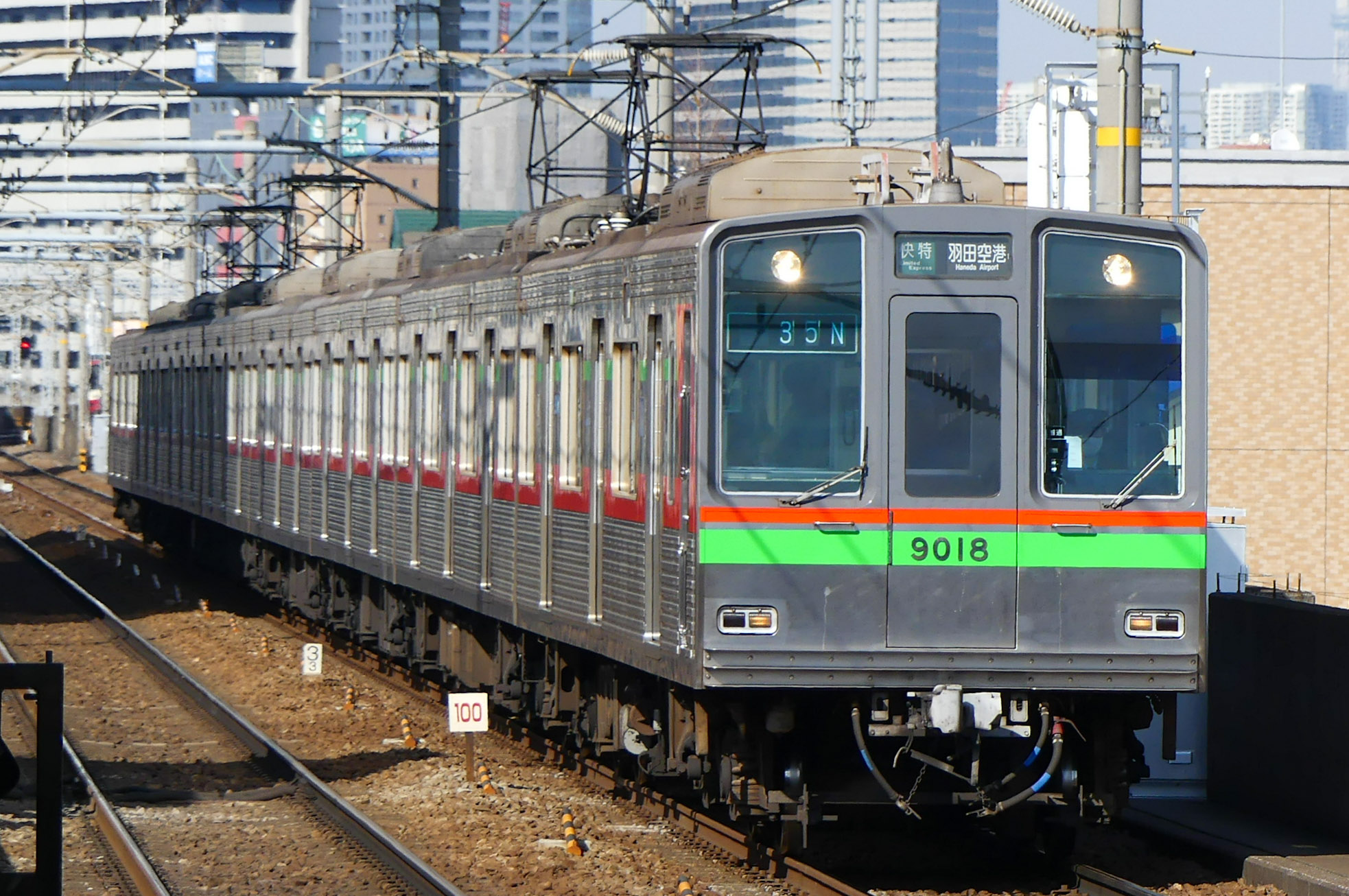
Chiba New Town Railway 9000 series

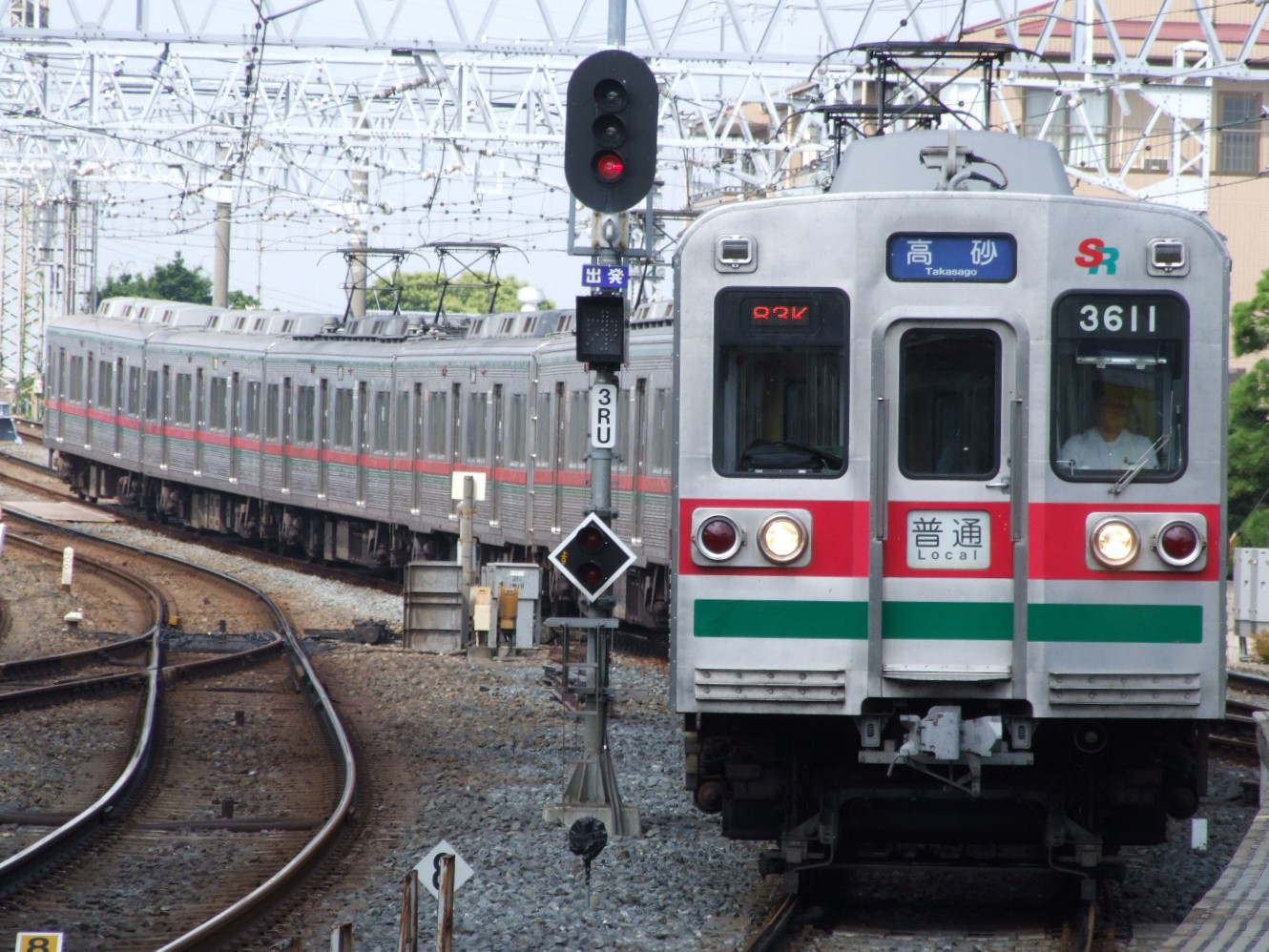
Shibayama Railway 3600 series

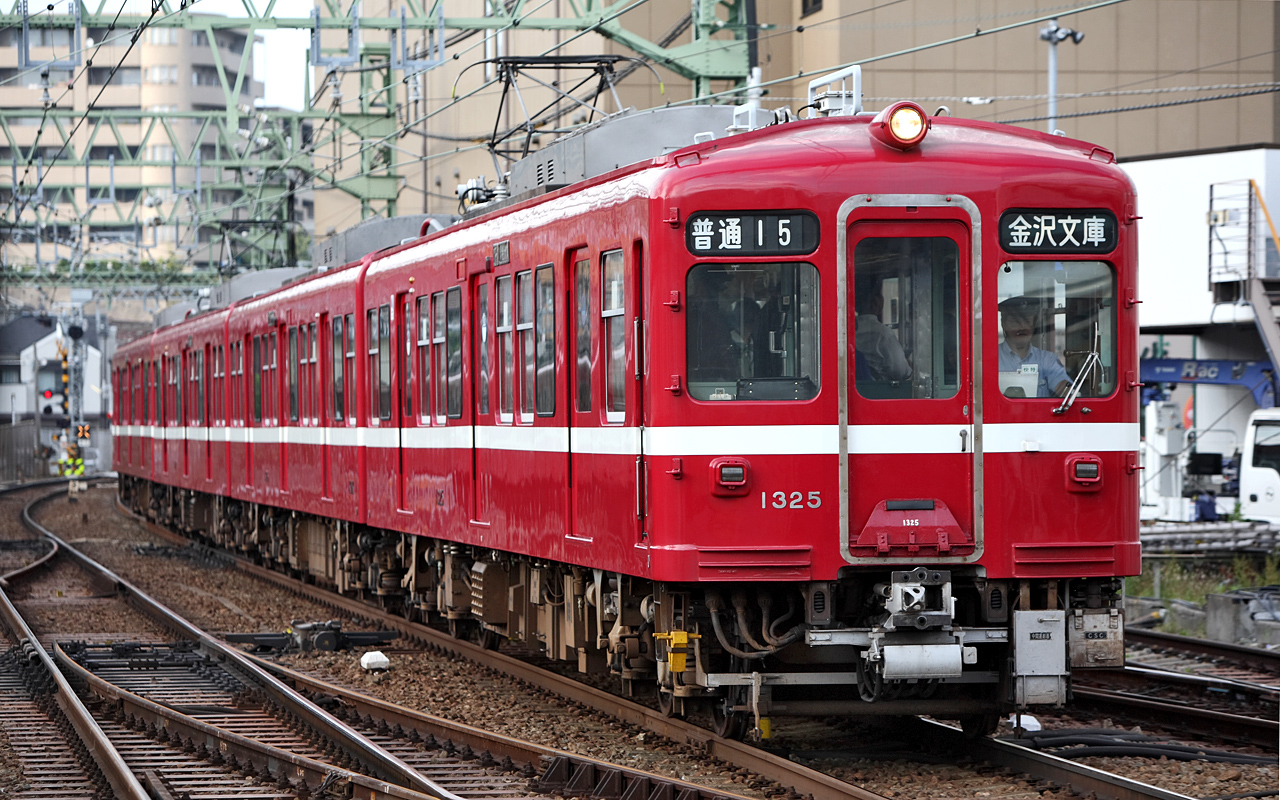
Keikyu 1000 series

== Mita Line ==
Toei Mita Line trains are 20 m long 6/8-car formations with four doors per side.

=== Present ===
Toei

- Toei 6300 series (6-car sets) (since 1993)
- Toei 6500 series (8-car sets) (since 2022)

Tokyu Corporation

- Tokyu 3000 series (II) (8-car sets) (since 2000)
- Tokyu 5080 series (8-car sets) (since 2003)
- Tokyu 3020 series (8-car sets) (since October 2019)

Sagami Railway (Sotetsu)

- Sotetsu 21000 series (8-car sets) (since 18 March 2023)
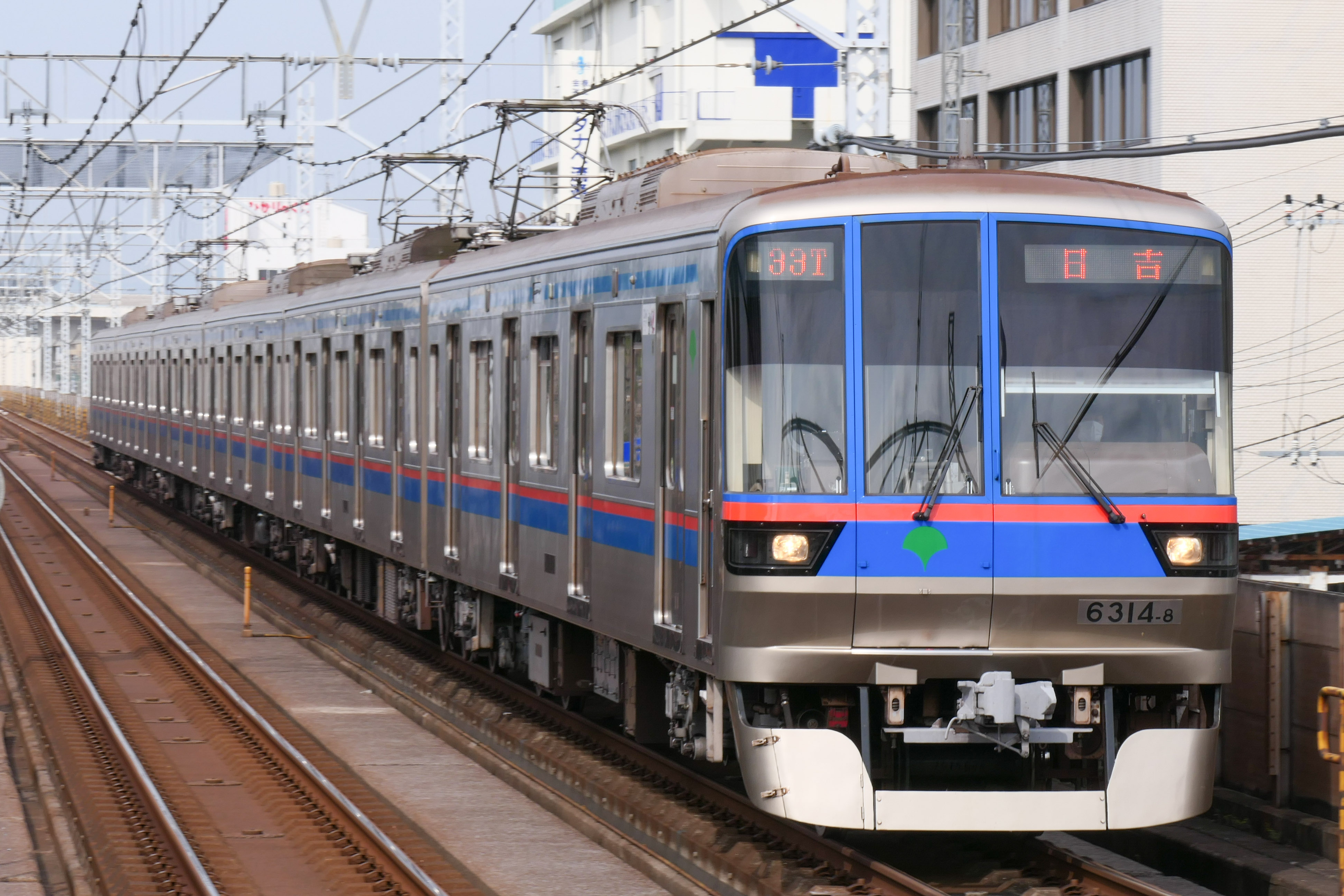
Toei 6300 series

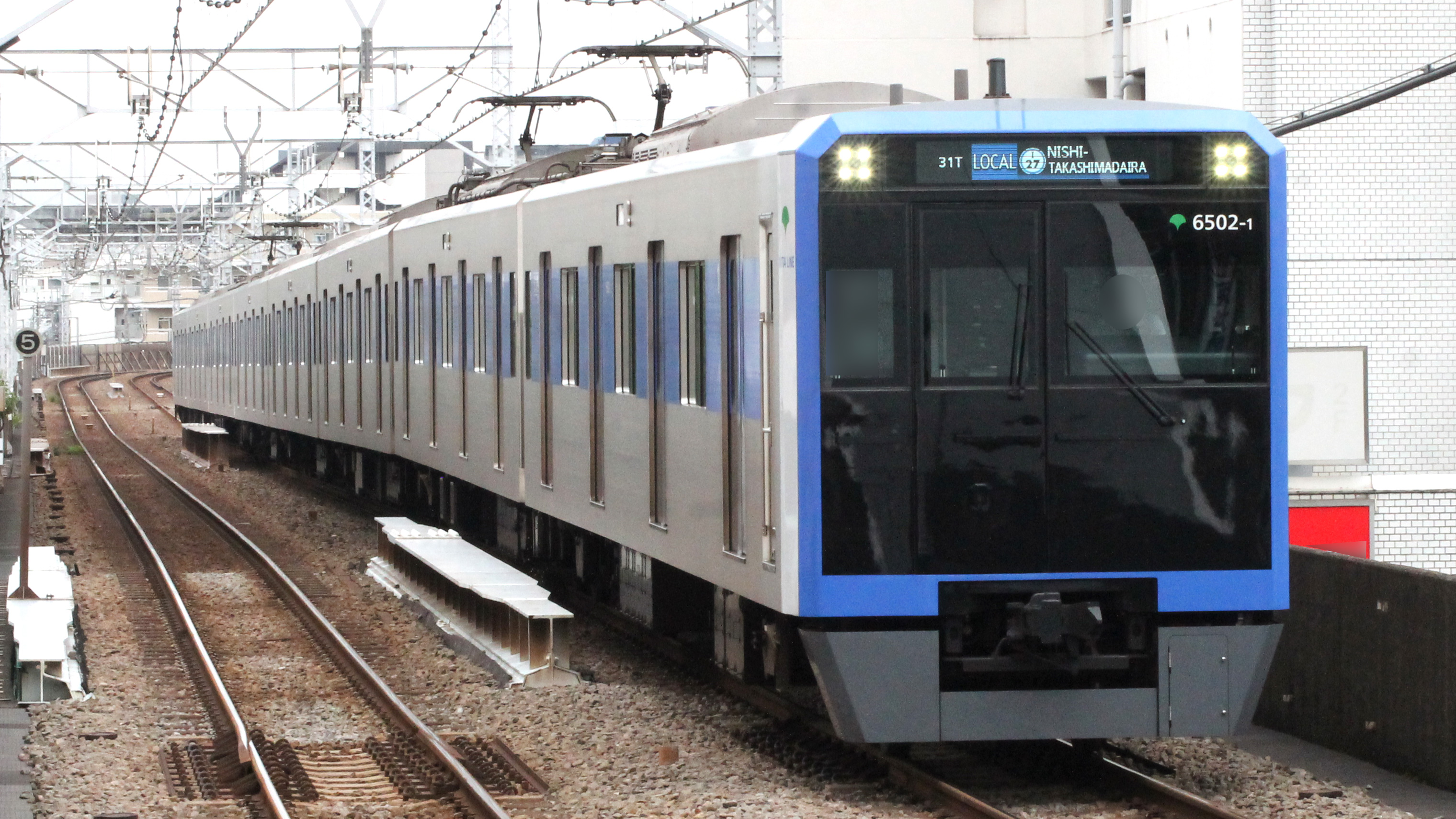
Toei 6500 series

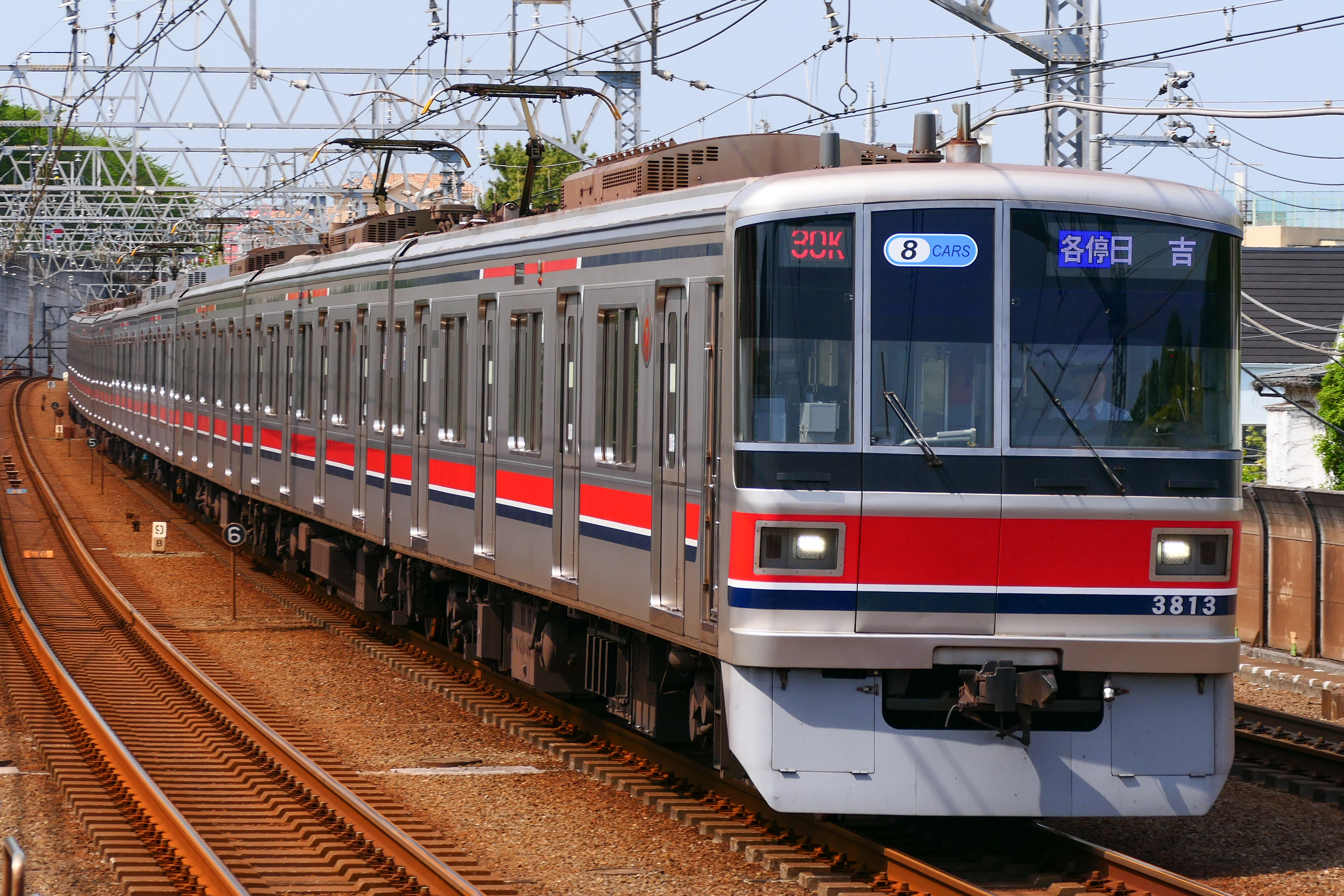
Tokyu 3000 series (II)

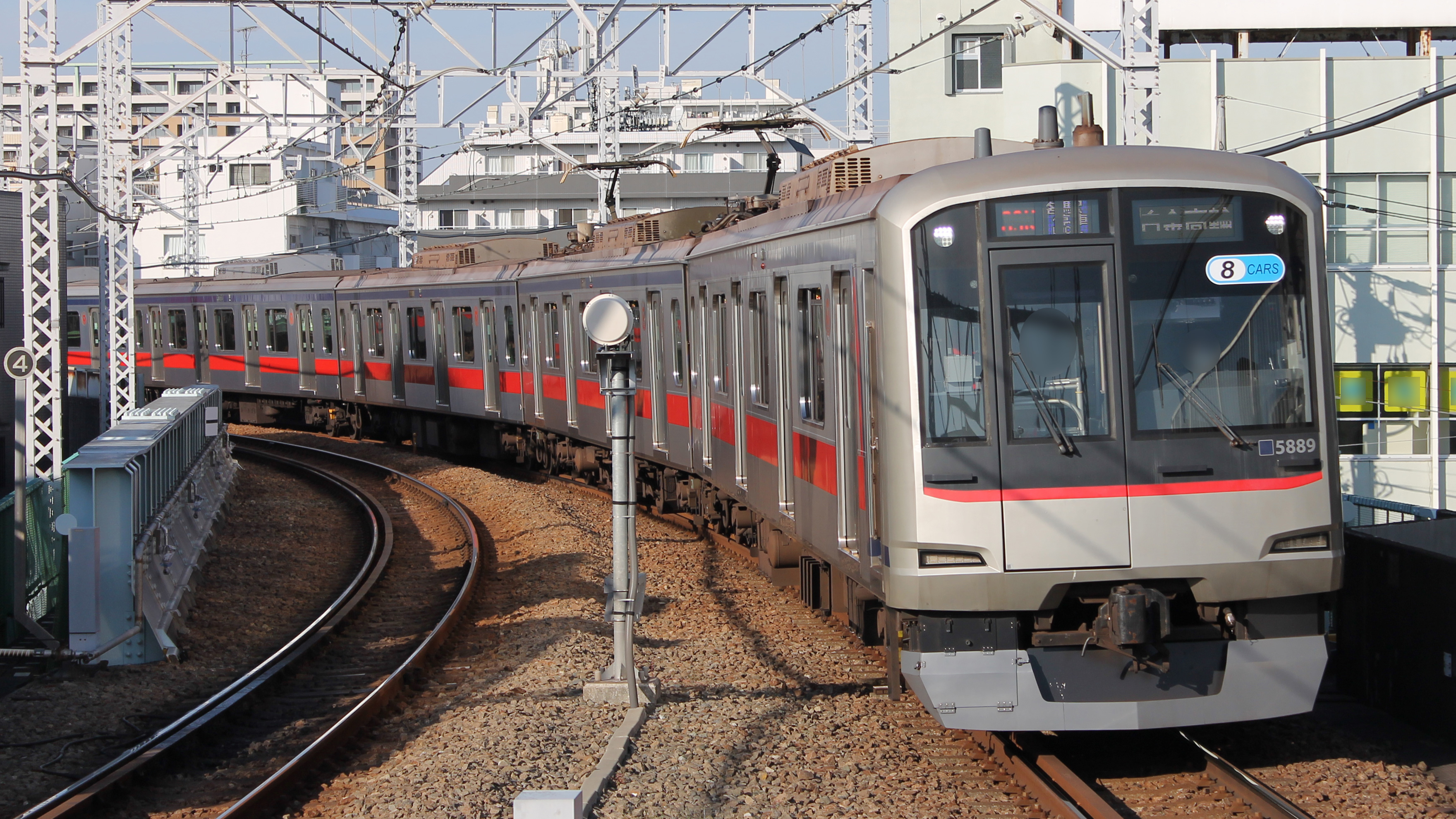
Tokyu 5080 series

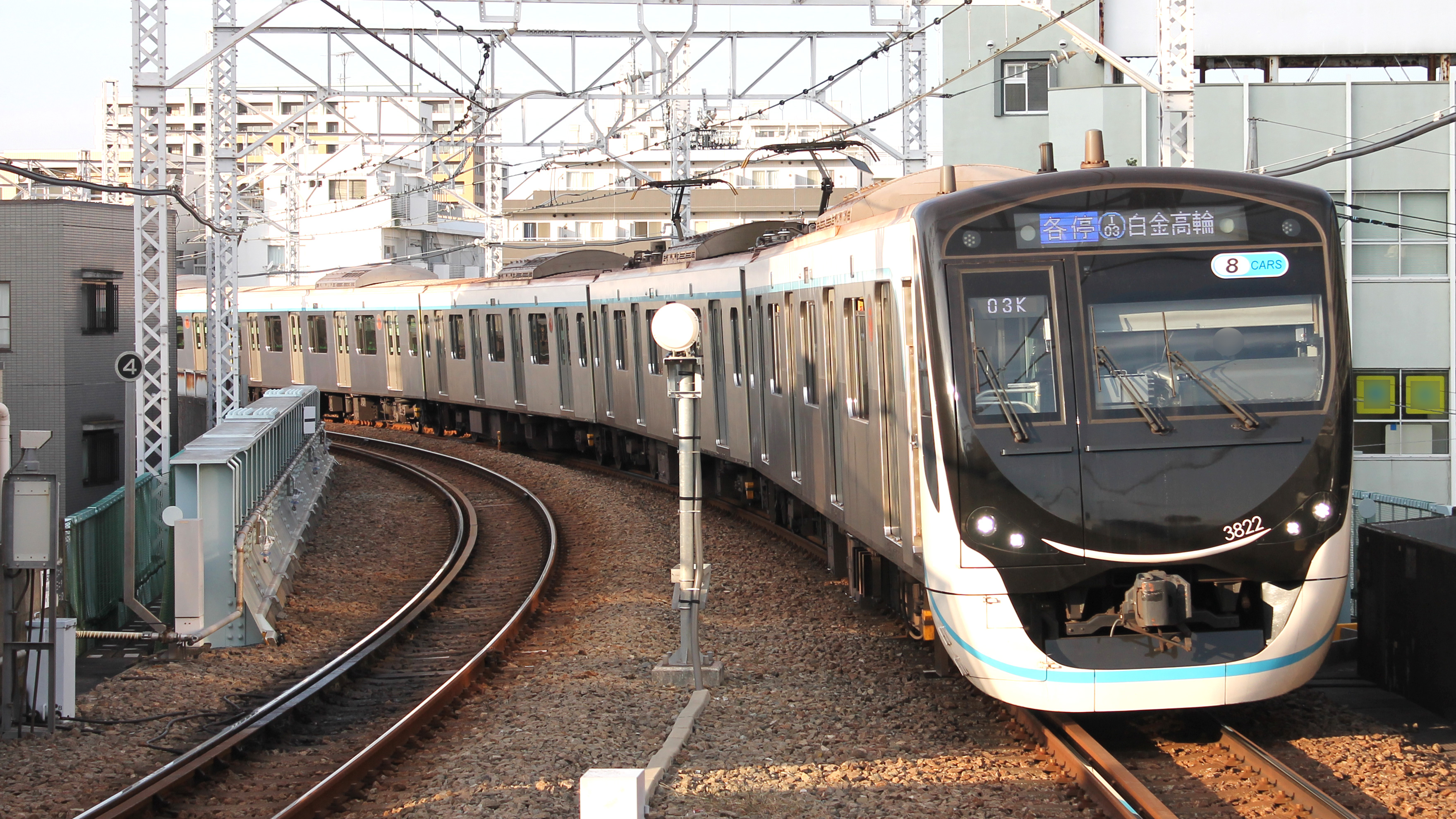
Tokyu 3020 series

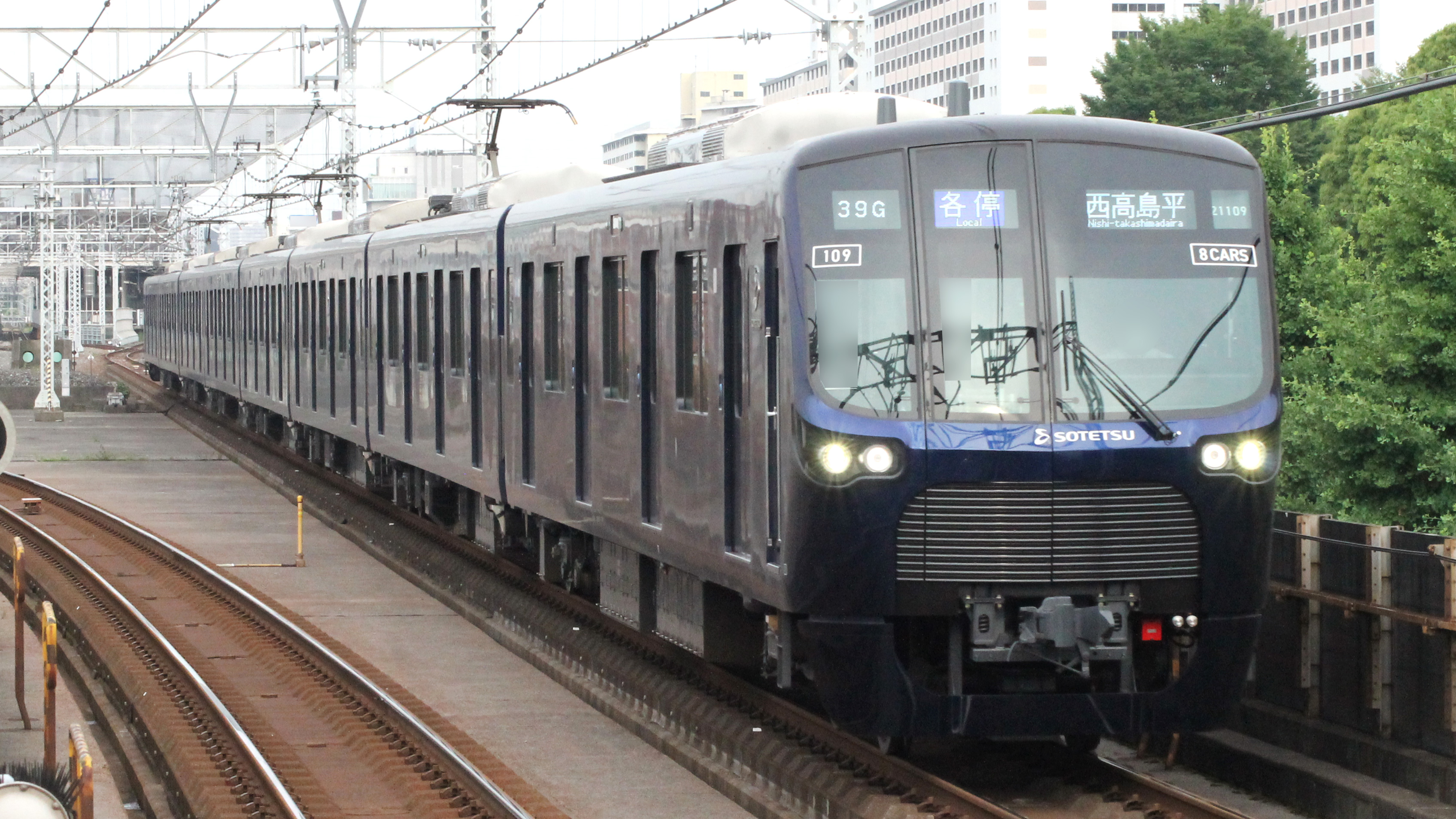
Sotetsu 21000 series

=== Former ===
Toei

- Toei 6000 series (6-car sets) (from 1968 until 1999)
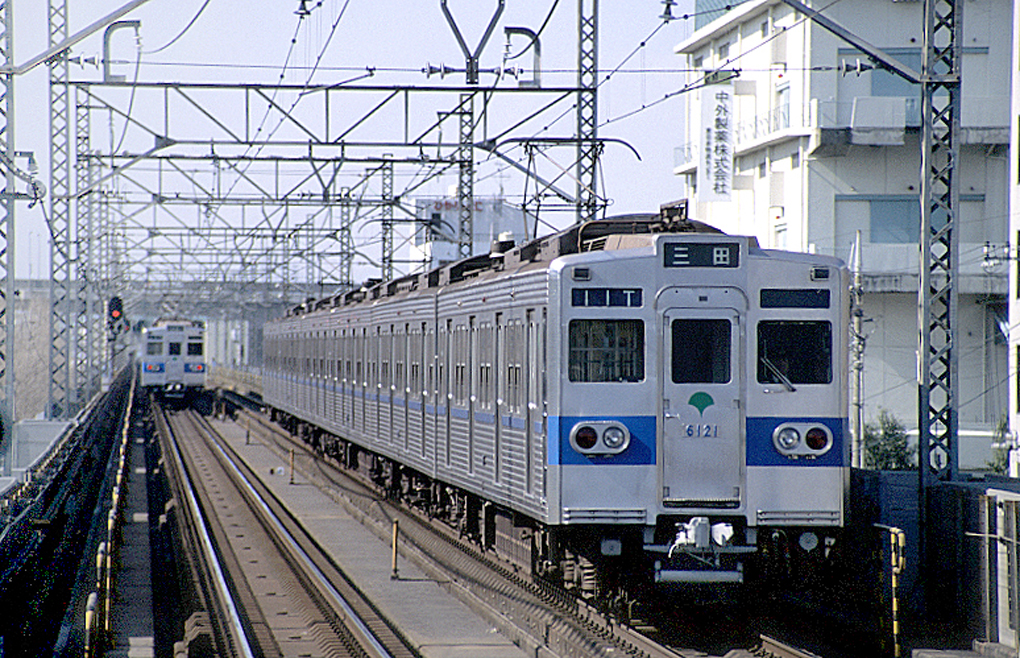
Toei 6000 series

== Shinjuku Line ==
Toei Shinjuku Line trains operate in 20 m long 8/10-car formations and have four doors per side. They also use a 1372mm track gauge.

=== Present ===
Toei

- Toei 10-300 series (since 2005)

Keio Corporation

- Keio 9030 series (since 2006)
- Keio 5000 series (since 2017)
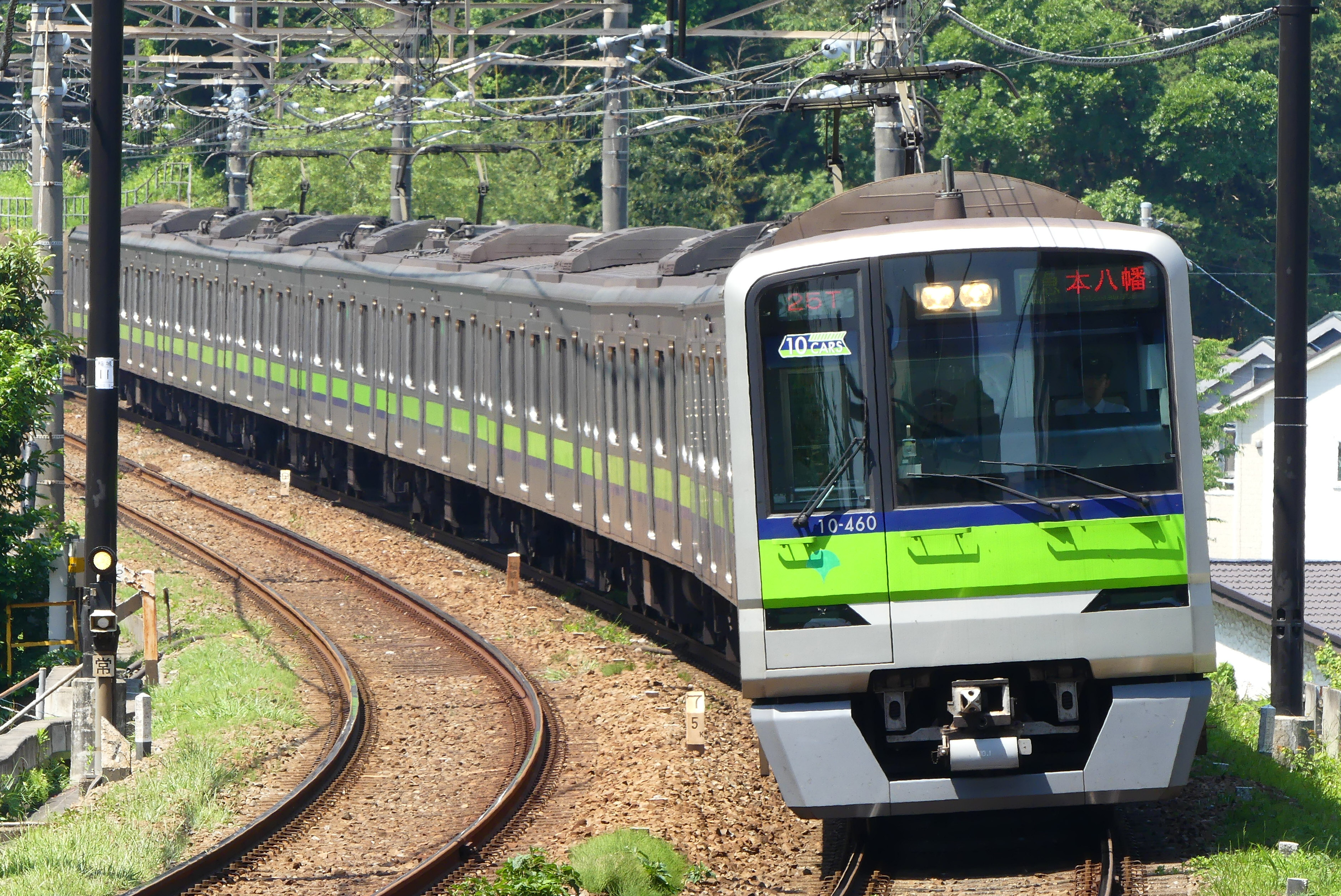
Toei 10-300 series (earlier batches)

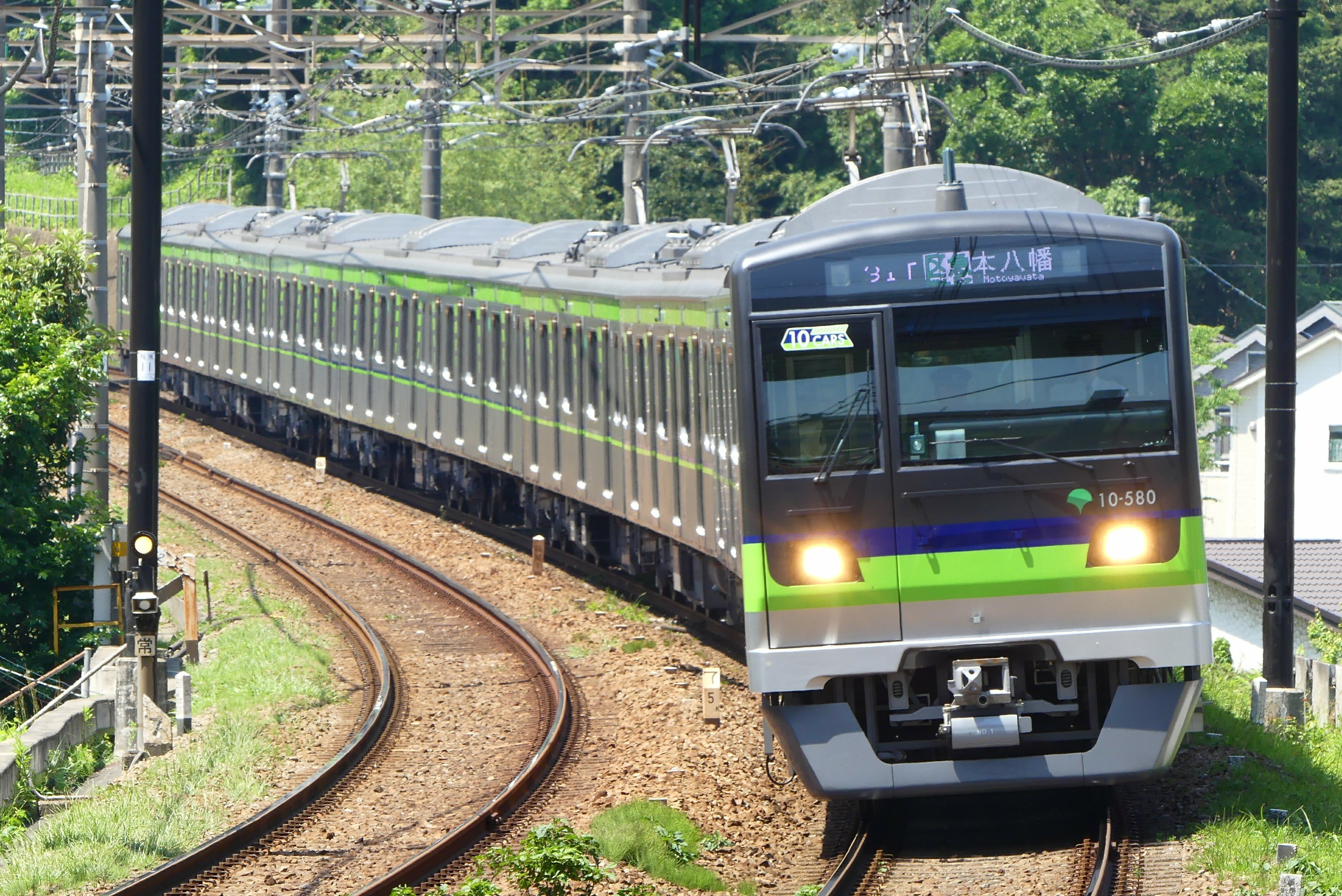
Toei 10-300 series (later batches)

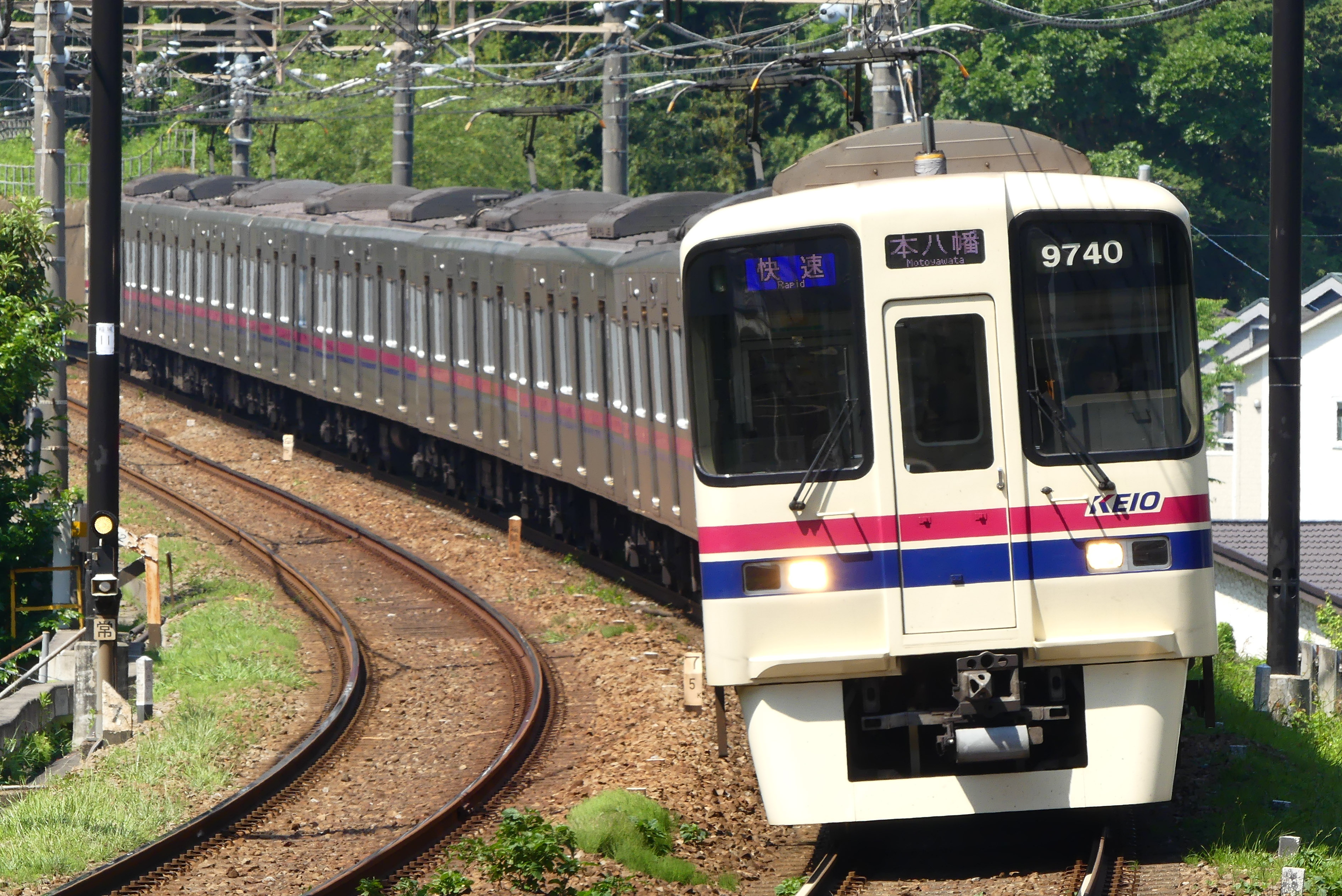
Keio 9030 series

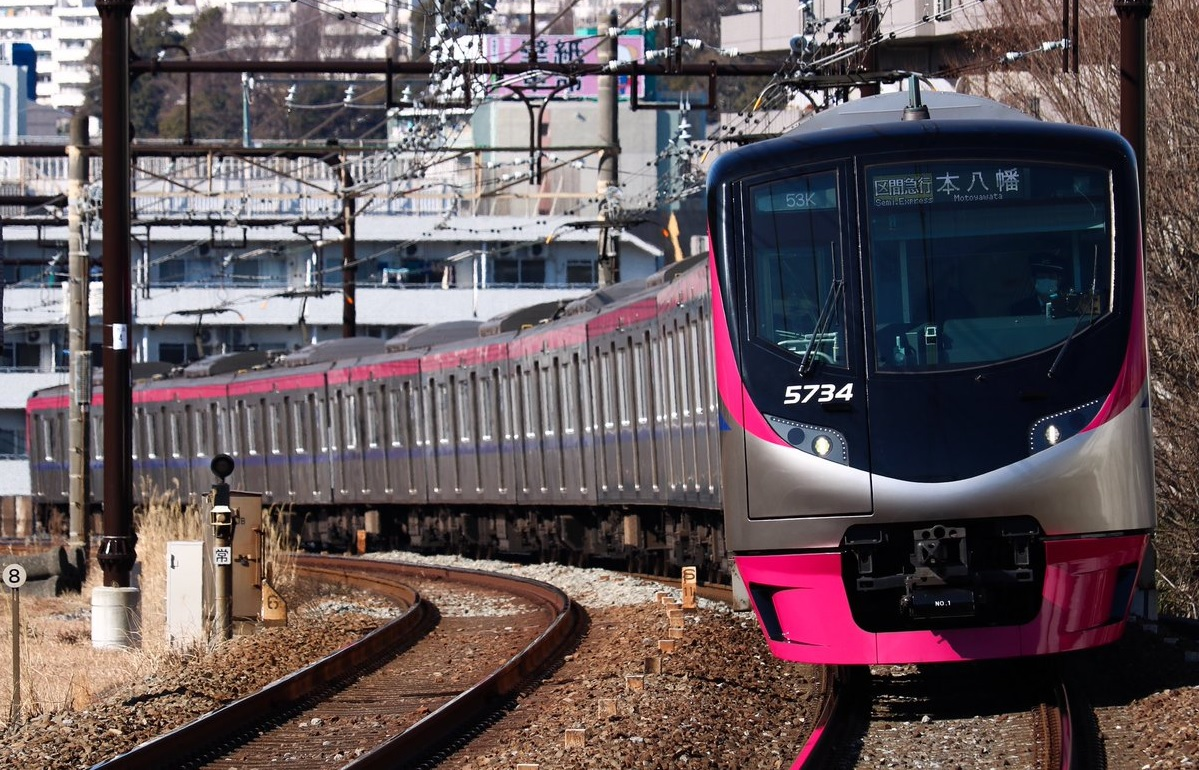
Keio 5000 series

=== Former ===
Toei

- Toei 10-000 series (from 1978 until 2018)
- Toei 10-300R series (from 2005 until 2017)

Keio Corporation

- Keio 6030 series (from 1980 until 2011)
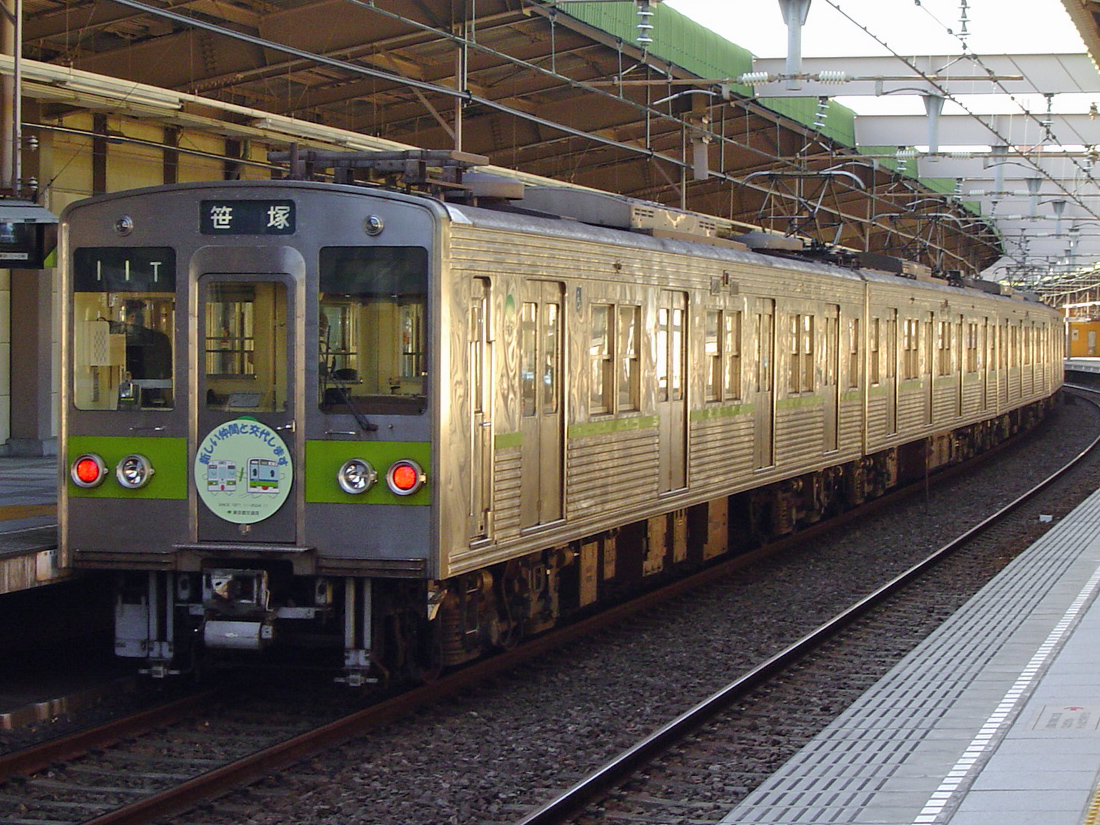
Toei 10-000 series (prototype)

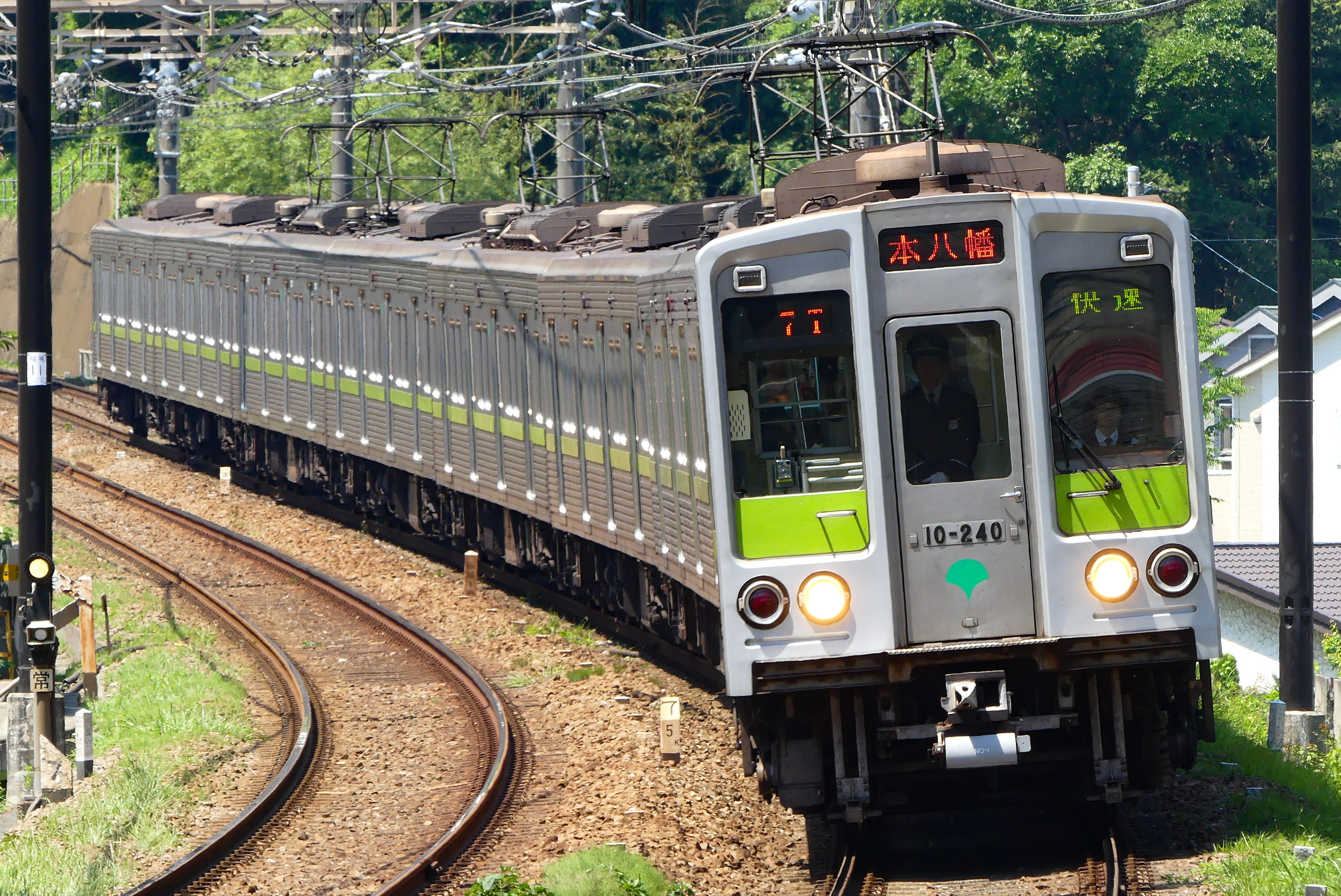
Toei 10-000 series

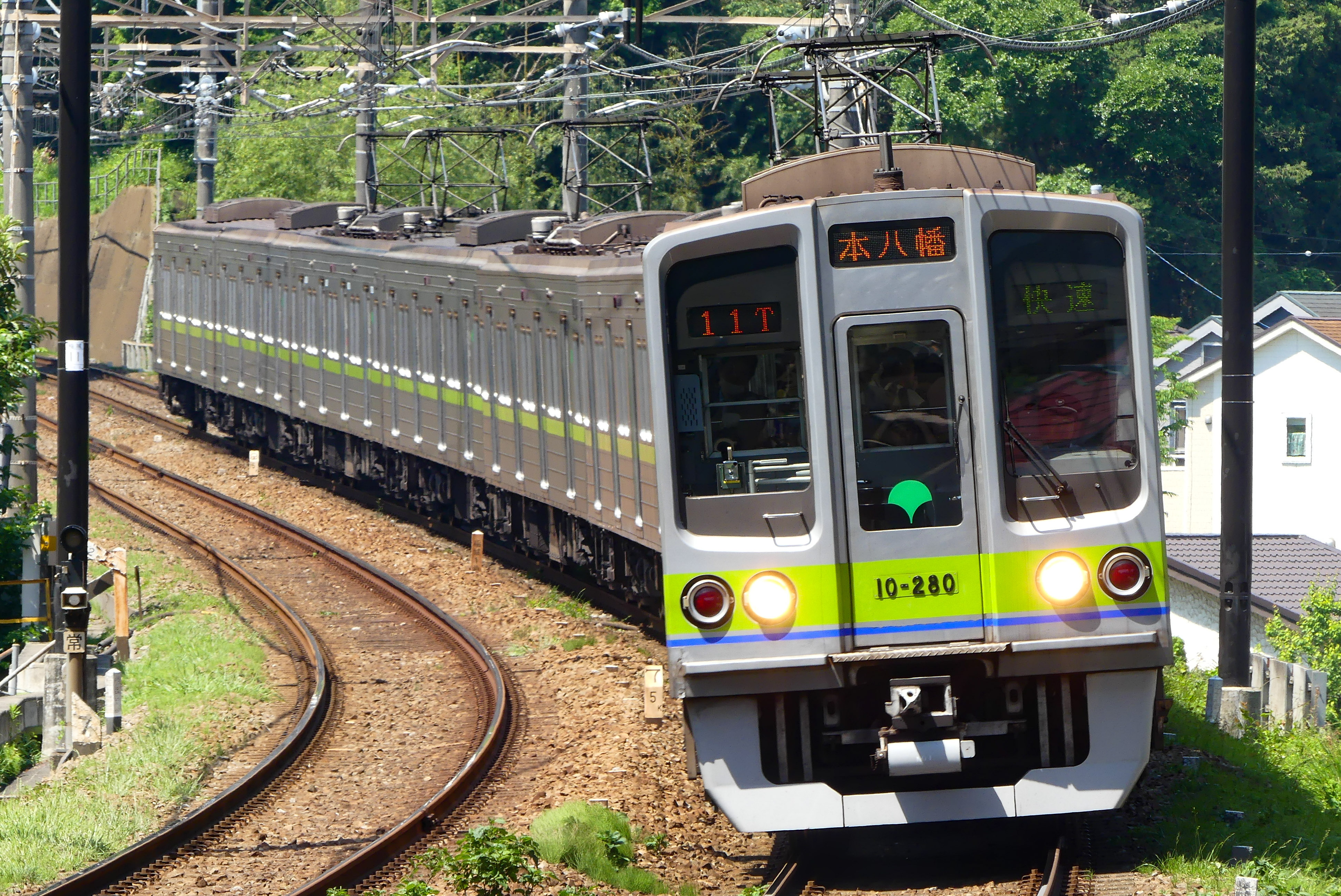
Toei 10-000 series (8th-batch)

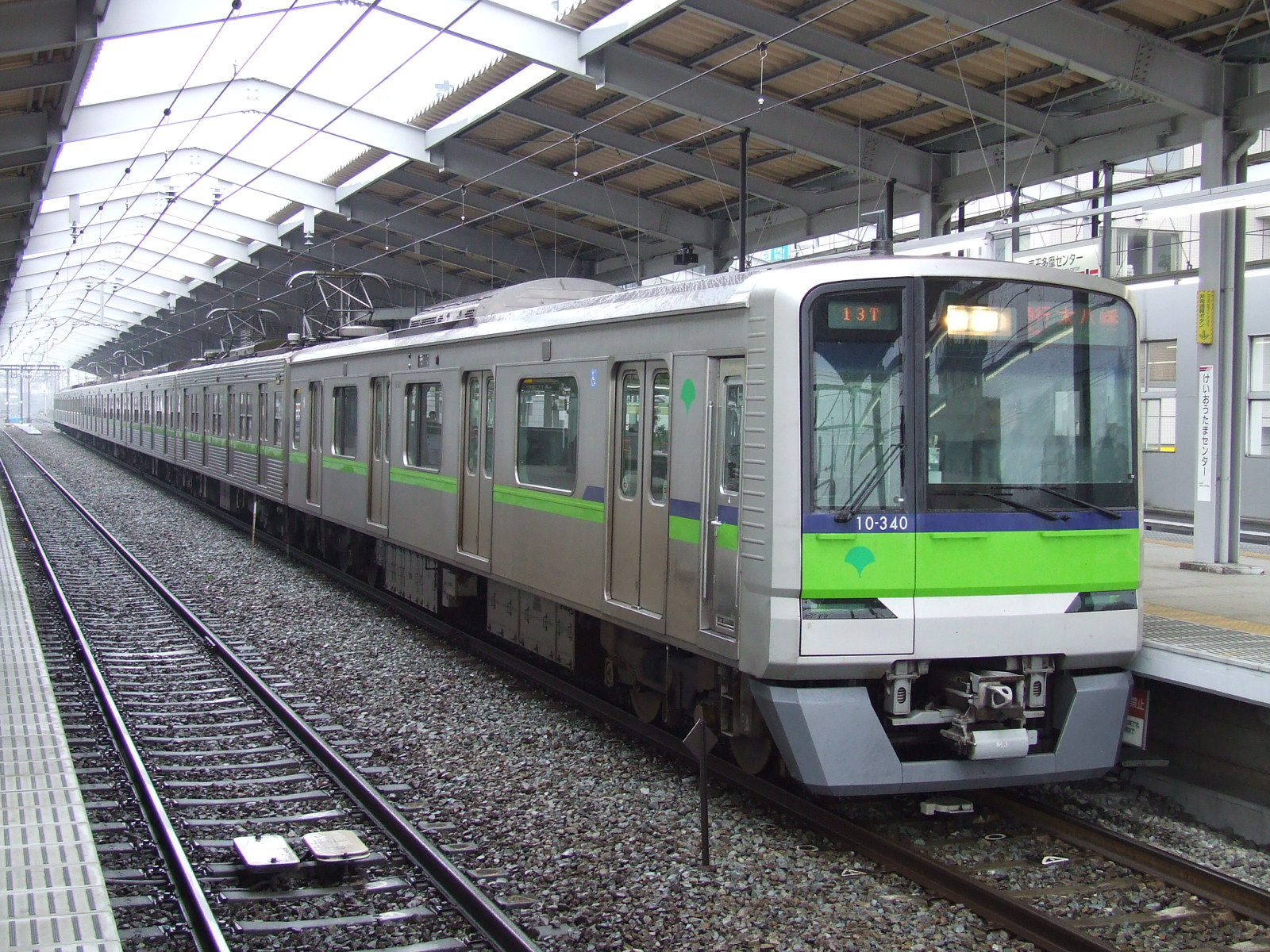
Toei 10-300R series

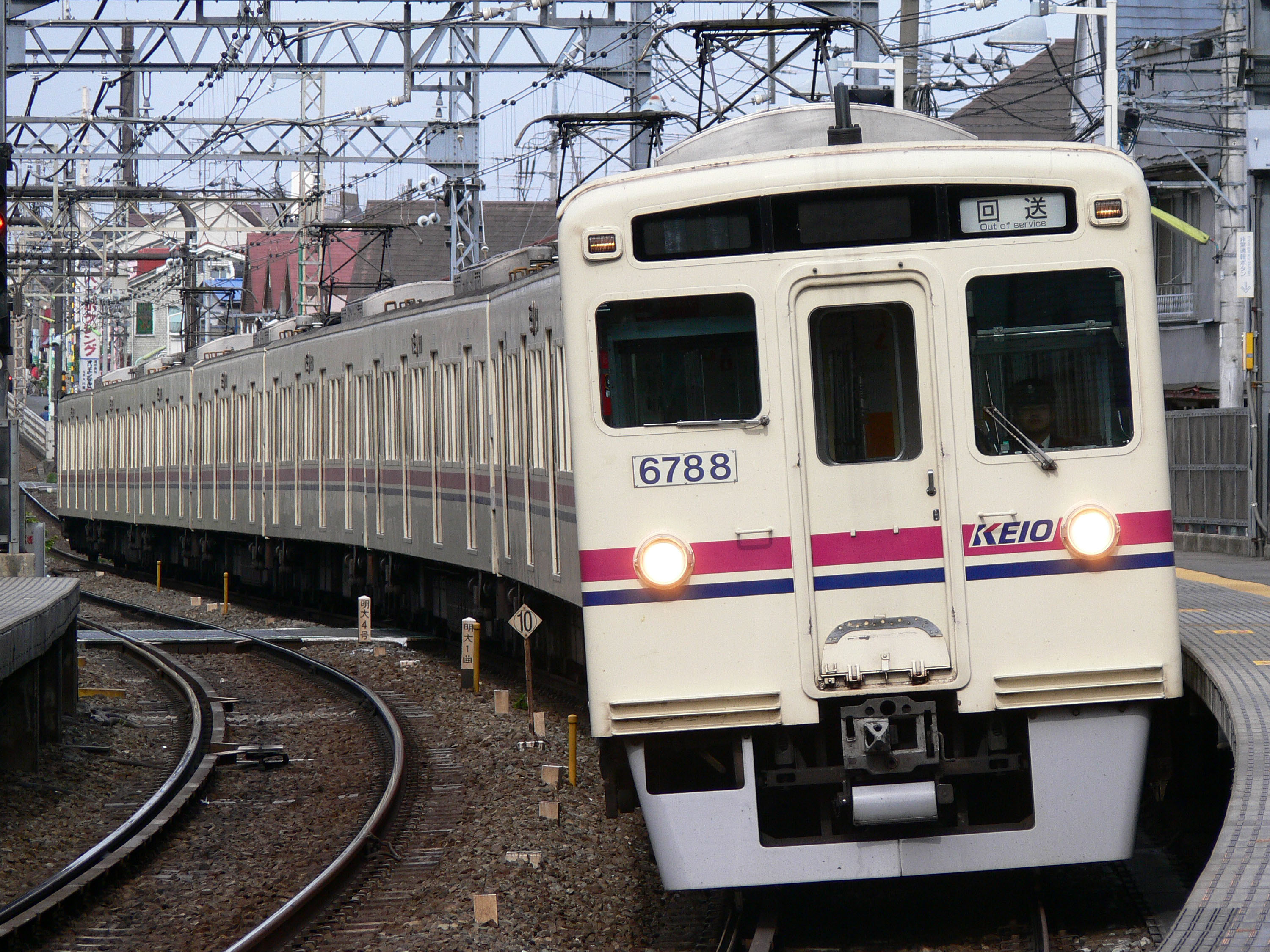
Keio 6030 series

== Ōedo Line ==
Toei Ōedo Line trains operate in 16 m long 8-car formations with no through trains into other suburban lines in Greater Tokyo. They are powered by linear induction motors.

- Toei 12-000 series (since 1991)
- Toei 12-600 series (since 2012)
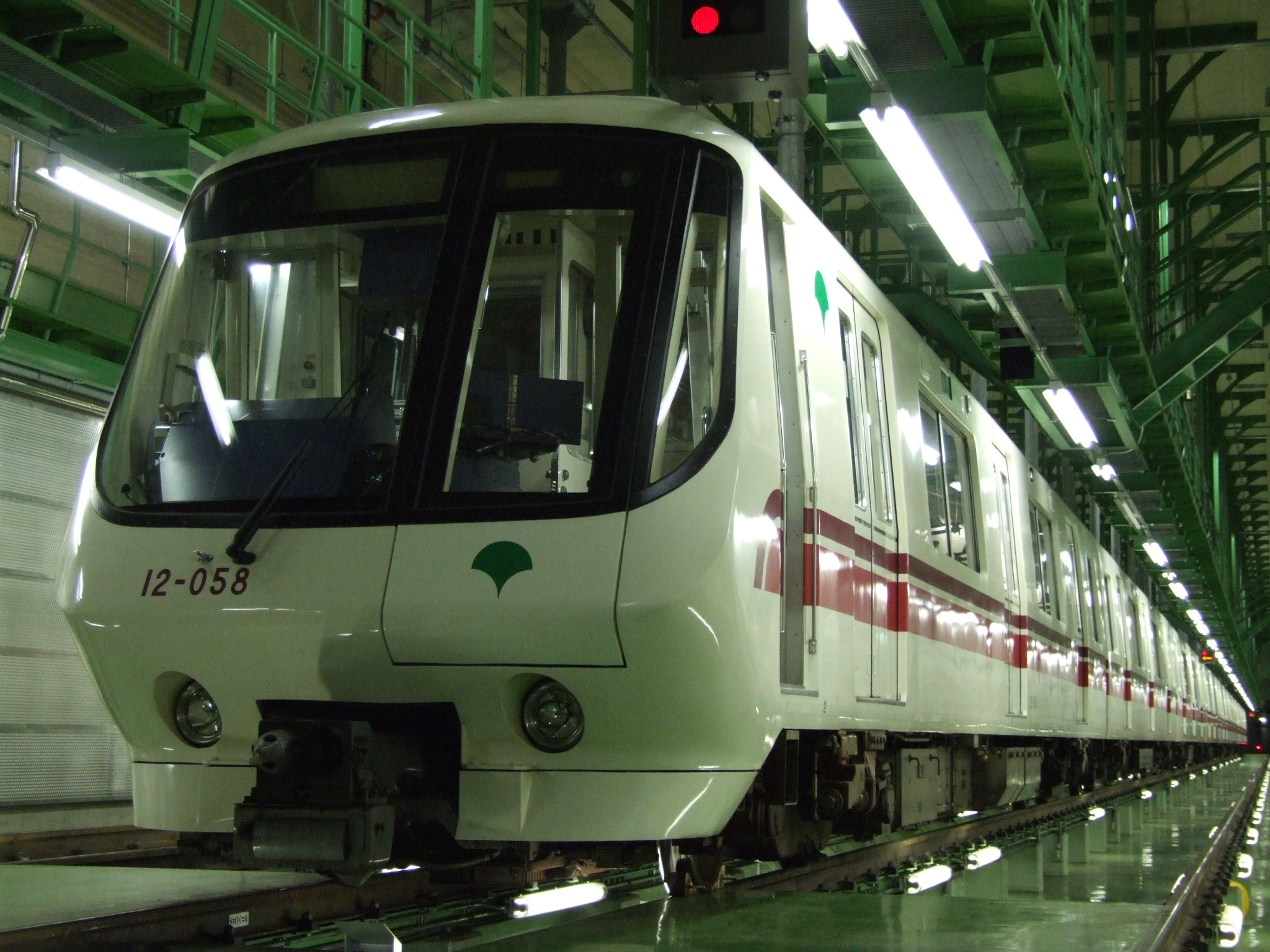
Toei 12-000 series (earlier batches)

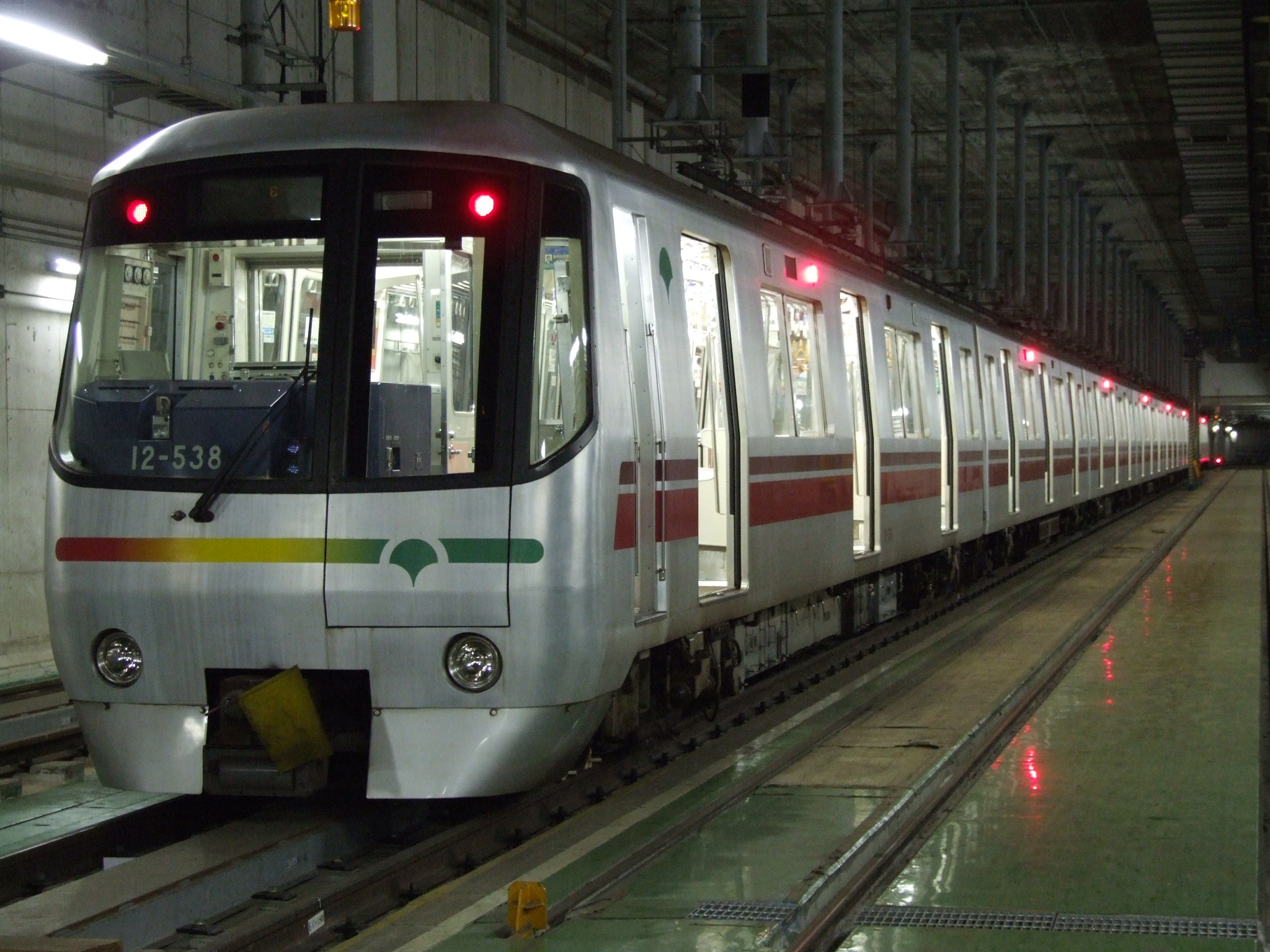
Toei 12-000 series (later batches)

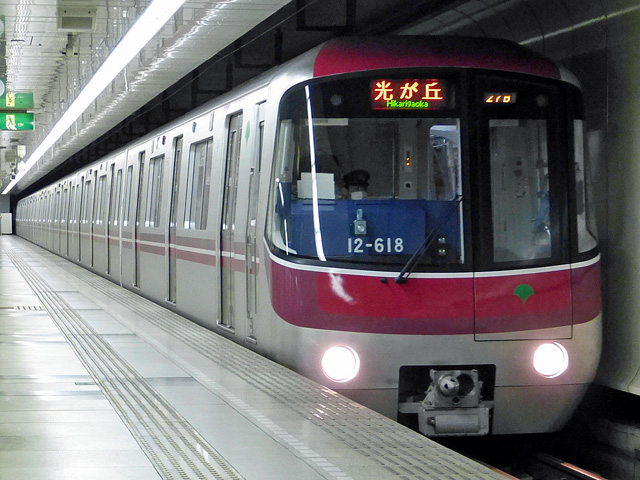
Toei 12-600 series

== See also ==
- Tokyo Metro rolling stock
- Tokyo subway
