= Olympic flame =

Symbol of the Olympic Games

The Olympic flame is a symbol used in the Olympic movement. It is also a symbol of continuity between ancient and modern games. The Olympic flame is lit at Olympia, Greece or since 2012 for the Youth Olympic Games, at Athens, Greece. This ceremony starts the Olympic torch relay, which formally ends with the lighting of the Olympic cauldron during the opening ceremony of the Olympic Games. The flame then continues to burn in the cauldron (or in a lantern as in 2024) for the duration of the Games until it is extinguished during the Olympic closing ceremony.

== Origins ==
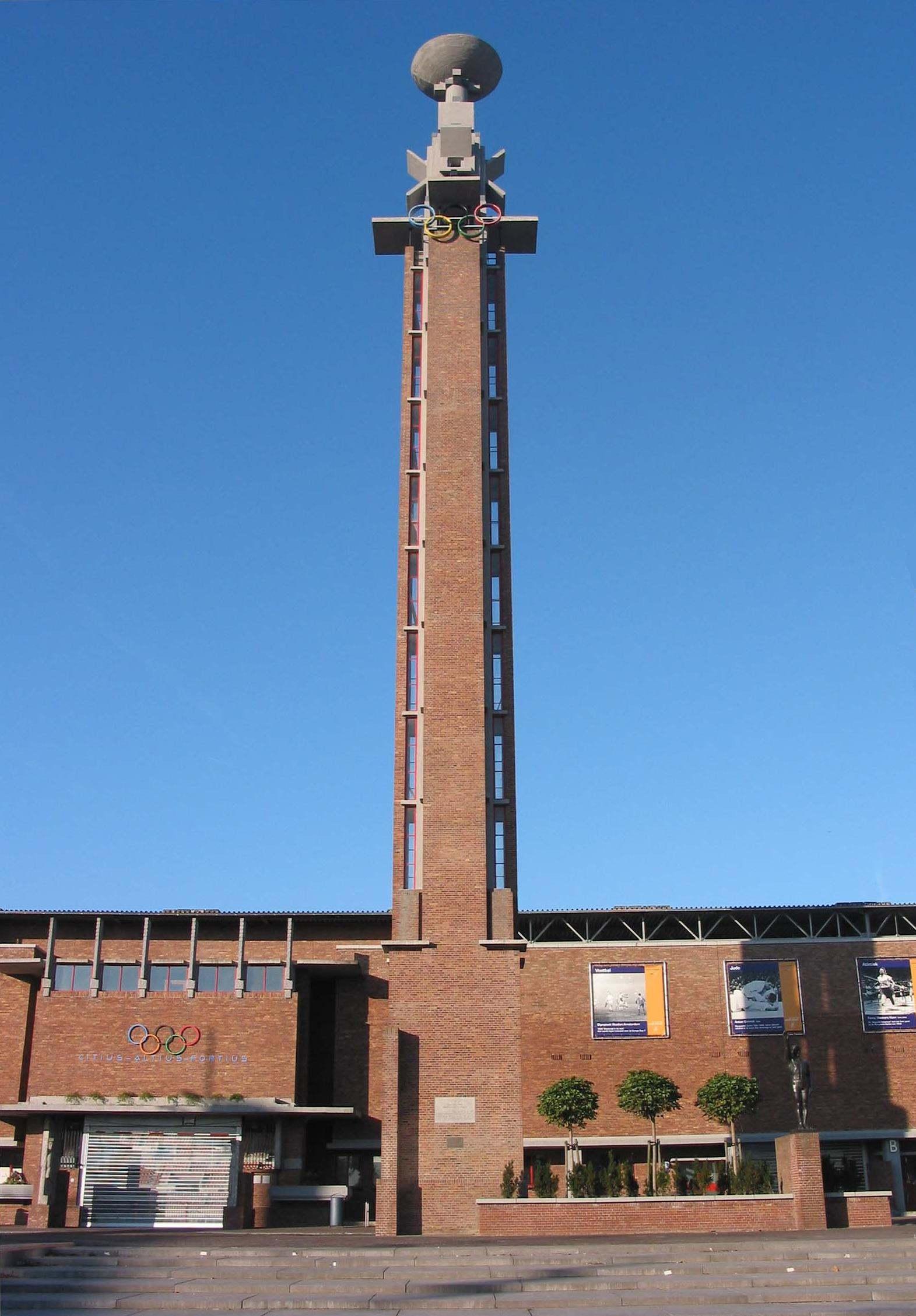
The Marathon Tower at the Amsterdam Olympic Stadium, where a symbolic flame burned in 1928

The first time that a symbolic flame made its appearance in the Summer Olympic Games was for the 1928 Summer Olympics in Amsterdam. The main purpose of this fire, placed in a large bowl on top of a slender tower, named "Marathon Tower", was to indicate for miles around where in Amsterdam the Olympic Games were being held. This tower was associated with the marathon race and all its elements, including the fire, were an idea of the architect Jan Wils who also had designed the stadium.

The idea for the Olympic flame was derived from ancient Greek ceremonies where a sacred fire was kept burning throughout the celebration of the ancient Olympics on the altar of the sanctuary of Hestia. In Ancient Greek mythology, fire had divine connotations and it was thought to have been stolen from the gods by Prometheus. Sacred fires were present at many ancient Greek sanctuaries, including those at Olympia. Every four years, when Zeus was honoured at the Olympic Games, additional fires were lit at his temple and that of his wife, Hera. The modern Olympic flame is ignited every two years in front of the ruins of the temple of Hera.

When the idea of a symbolic fire was introduced during the 1928 Summer Olympics, an employee of the Electric Utility of Amsterdam lit the first symbolic flame in the Marathon Tower of the Olympic Stadium in Amsterdam. The Olympic flame and the Olympic torch relay was first introduced to the Summer Olympics at the 1936 Summer Olympics in Berlin by Carl Diem. The first ever torch-lighting ceremony was held in Olympia, Greece on July 20, 1936. The torches used were made by Krupp, and the mirror used to light the flame was made by Zeiss Optics, both companies with links to the Nazi government of the time.

== Main ceremonies ==
=== Lighting of the flame ===
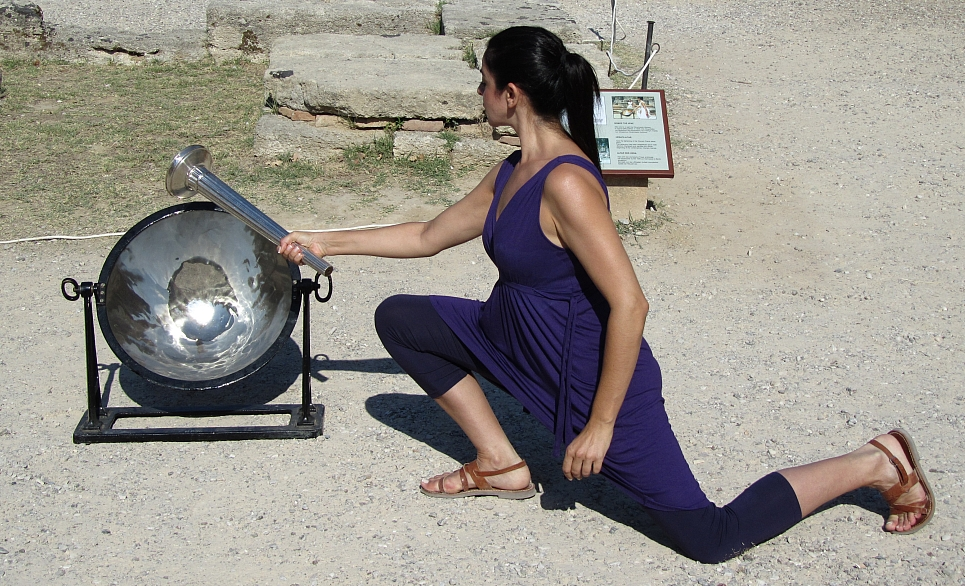
Lighting the Olympic flame in a dress rehearsal in Greece, using the sun's energy

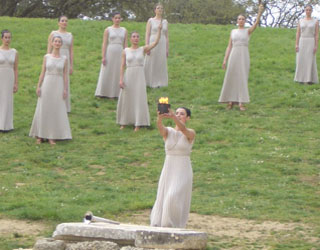
Actresses playing the role of priestesses during the Olympic flame lighting ceremony

The Olympic flame is ignited some weeks or months before the opening ceremony of the Olympic Games at the main site of the ancient Olympics in Olympia, Greece.

A group of women representing the Vestal Virgins (Note: The Roman Vesta is derived from the Greek goddess Hestia. Hestia's rituals at the founding of a new settlement also included the transfer of a continuous flame from the founding city.) (usually 11 in number) perform a celebration at the Temple of Hera, during which a fire is kindled by the light of the Sun, its rays concentrated by a parabolic mirror. The fire is used to light the first torch of the Olympic Torch Relay. Where cloudy weather prevents the use of the parabolic mirror on the day of the ceremony (as in 2024), a backup flame is used that has been lit during a prior dress rehearsal. An actress plays the role of the temple's high priestess and presents the torch and an olive branch to the first relay bearer, usually a Greek athlete who has already qualified to compete in that edition of the Games. This is followed by a recitation of a poem by Pindar, and the release of a flock of doves to symbolize peace.

At the beginning of the ceremony, the Olympic hymn is sung first followed by the national anthem of the country hosting the Olympics and the national anthem of Greece along with the hoisting of the flags.

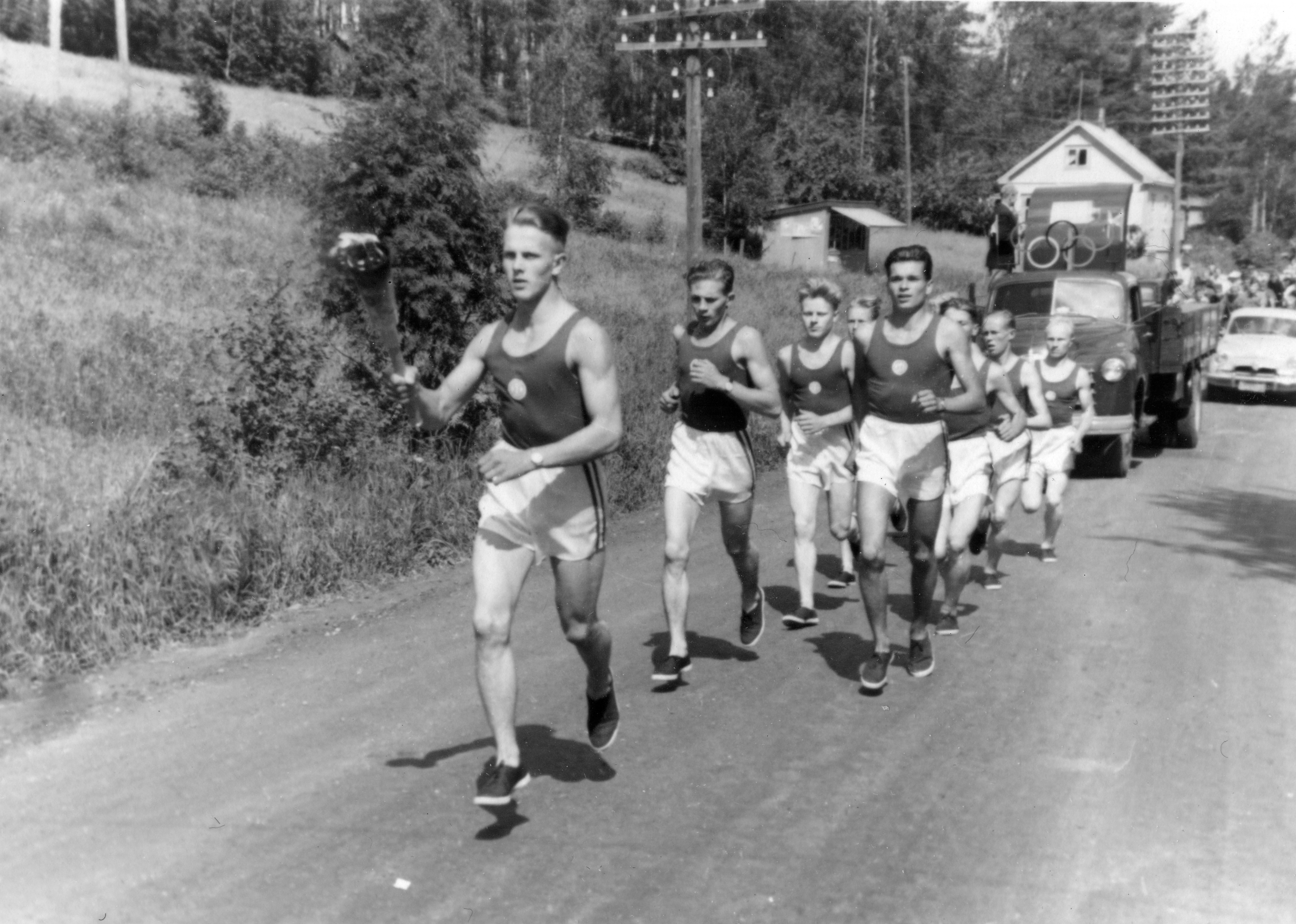
Olympic torch relay, 1952

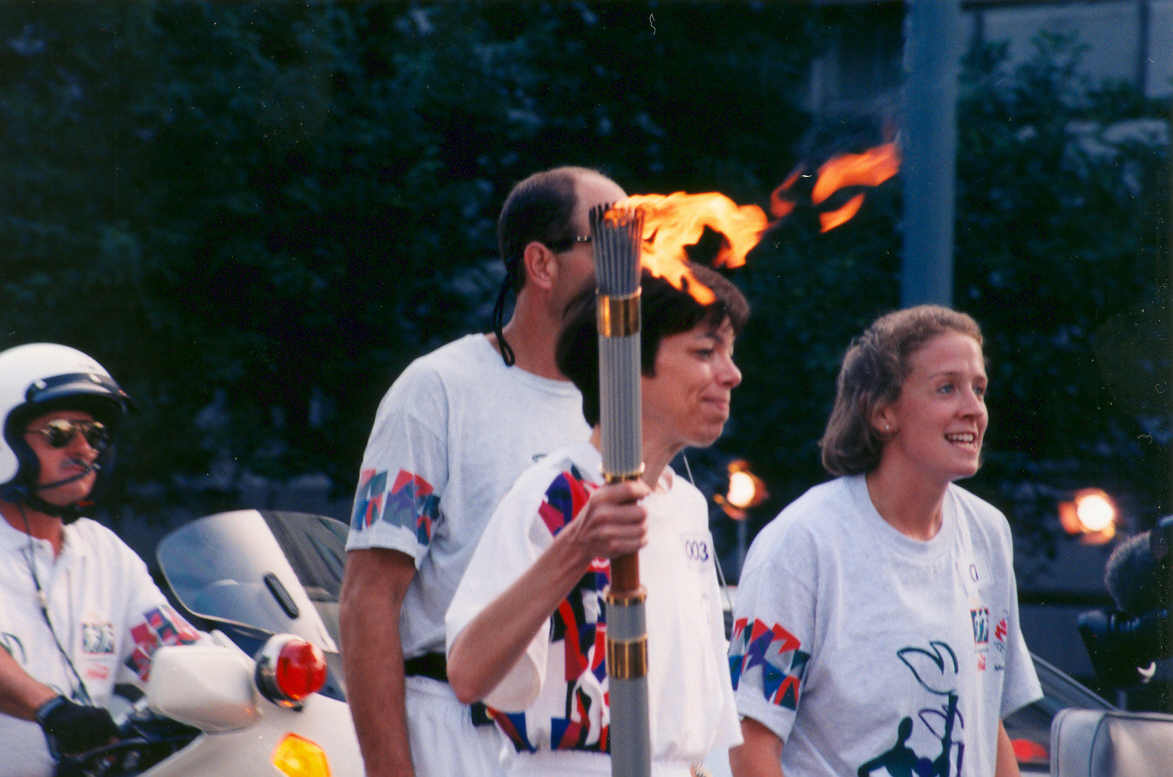
Olympic torch relay, 1996

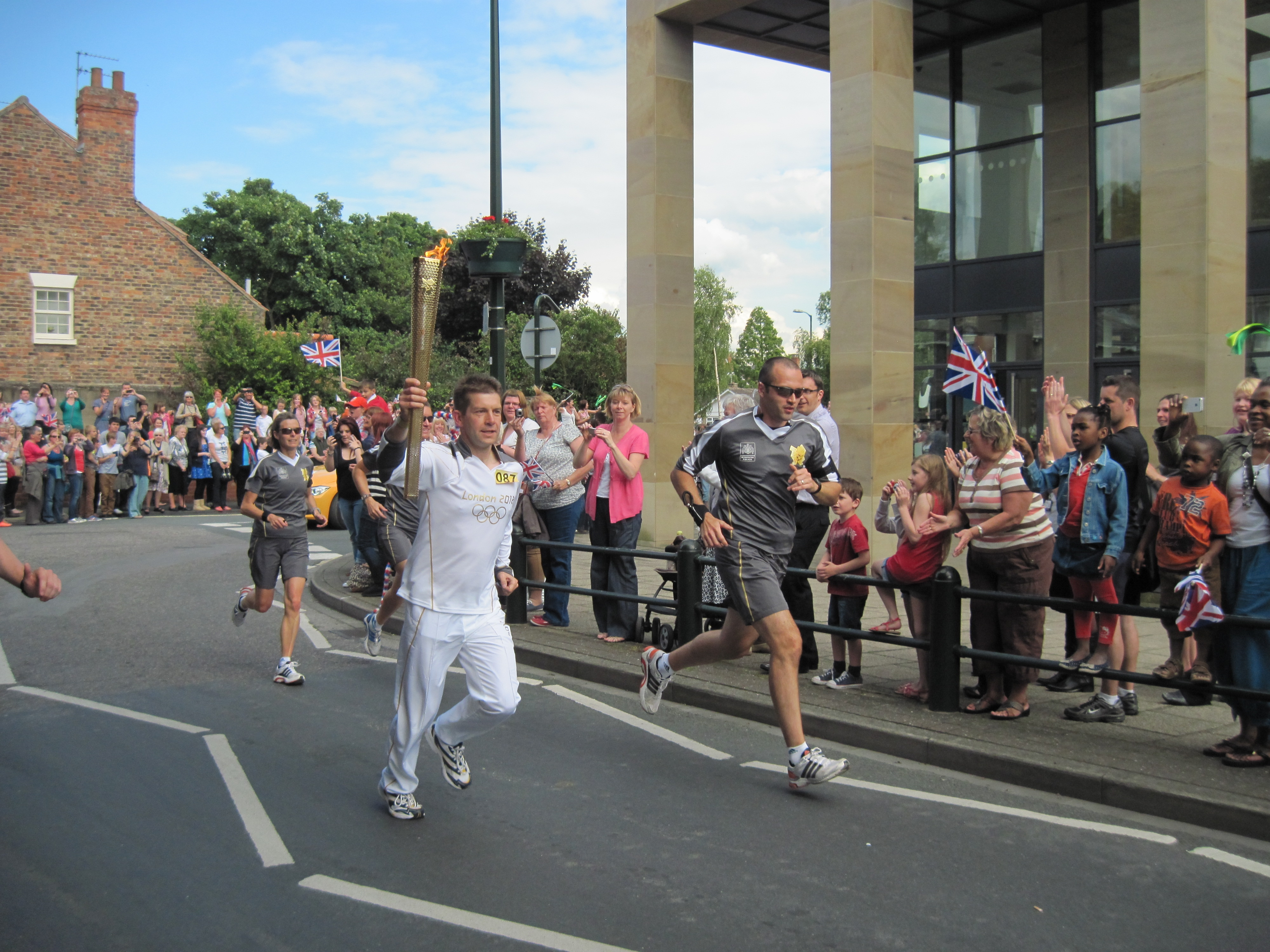
Olympic torch relay, 2012

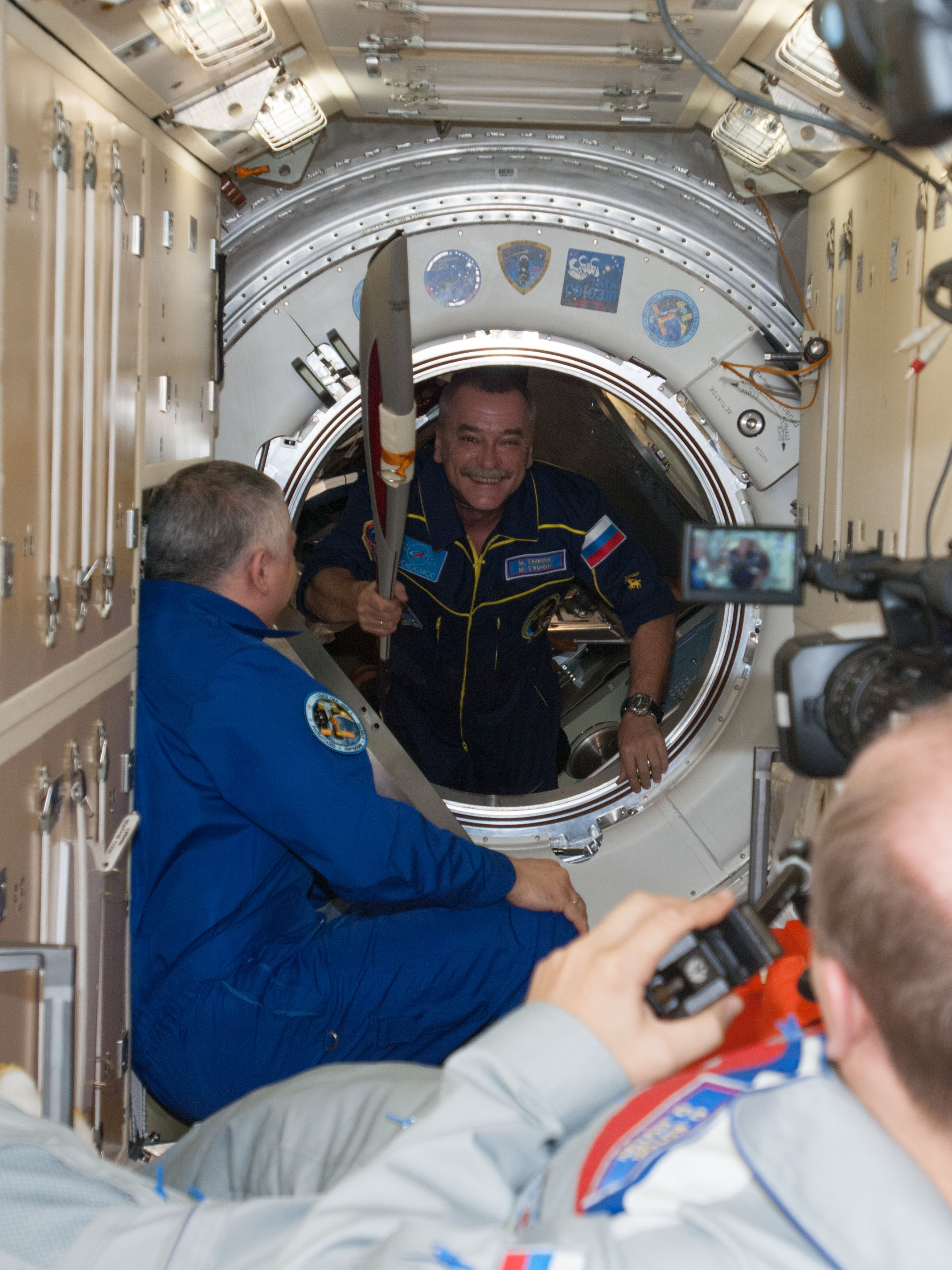
The 2014 Olympic torch in space during Soyuz TMA-11M

After the ceremony at Olympia the Olympic flame first travels to Greece. It first goes to the Coubertin Grove on the site of the International Olympic Academy, where it is used to light an altar beside the final resting place of Pierre de Coubertin's heart. The flame is then transferred during a ceremony in the Panathenaic Stadium in Athens from the Hellenic Olympic Committee to the current year's National Olympic Committee (NOC) and local Organizing Committee (OCOG) hosts.

At the end of the first Olympic torch relay, the Olympic flame arrives in Berlin, 1936

The Olympic torch relay, which transports the Olympic flame from Olympia, Greece to the various designated sites of the Games, had no ancient precedent and was introduced by Carl Diem at the 1936 Summer Olympics in Berlin, Germany.

At the first Olympic torch relay, the flame was transported from Olympia to Berlin over 3,187 kilometers (1,980 miles) by 3,331 runners in twelve days and eleven nights. Nazi Propaganda Minister Joseph Goebbels commissioned filmmaker and propagandist Leni Riefenstahl to film the event.

In the 1956 Melbourne Games in Australia, local veterinary student Barry Larkin protested against the relay when he tricked onlookers by carrying a fake flame, consisting of a pair of underpants set on fire in a plum pudding can, attached to a chair leg. He successfully managed to hand over the fake flame to Mayor of Sydney Pat Hills and escape without being noticed.

The Olympic torch travels routes that symbolise human achievement or the history of the host country. Although most of the time the torch with the Olympic flame is still carried by runners, it has been transported in many different ways. The fire travelled by boat in 1948 and 2012 to cross the English Channel and was carried by rowers in Canberra as well as by dragon boat in Hong Kong in 2008.

It was first transported by airplane in 1952 when the flame travelled to Helsinki. In 1956, all carriers in the torch relay to Stockholm, where the equestrian events were held instead of in Melbourne, travelled on horseback.

Remarkable means of transportation were used in 1976, when the flame was transformed to a radio signal and transmitted from Europe to the New World: Heat sensors in Athens detected the flame, the signal was sent to Ottawa via satellite where it was received and used to trigger a laser beam to re-light the flame. The torch, but not the flame, was taken into space by astronauts in 1996, 2000 and 2014. Other unique means of transportation include a Native American canoe, a camel, and Concorde. The torch has been carried across water; during the French leg of the 1968 Winter Olympics was carried across the port of Marseille by a diver holding it aloft above the water. In 2000, an underwater flare was used by a diver across the Great Barrier Reef en route to the Sydney Games. In 2012 it was carried by boat across Bristol Harbour in the UK and on the front of a London Underground train to Wimbledon.

In 2004, the first global torch relay was undertaken, a journey that lasted 78 days. The Olympic flame covered a distance of more than 78,000 km in the hands of some 11,300 torchbearers, travelling to Africa and South America for the first time, visiting all previous and future Summer Olympic cities, and finally returning to Greece for the 2004 Summer Olympics.

The 2008 Summer Olympics torch relay spanned six continents before proceeding through China. However, there were protests against China's human rights record in London where a "ring of steel" was formed around the flame to protect it, but one protester managed to grab hold of the torch while it was being held by television presenter Konnie Huq. In Paris the torch was extinguished at least twice by Chinese officials (five times according to French police) so that it could be transported in a bus amid protests while it was being paraded through Paris. This eventually led to the cancellation of the relay's last leg in the city. Demonstrations were also held in San Francisco and the route the torch would take was cut in half.

As a result, in 2009, the International Olympic Committee announced that from the 2010 Winter Olympics onward, the future torch relays could be held only within the country hosting the Olympics after the initial Greek leg was finished. Although this rule took effect with the 2010 Winter Olympics, the organizers of the 2012 Summer Olympics in London, the 2014 Winter Olympics in Sochi, and 2016 Summer Olympics in Rio de Janeiro chose to hold their torch relays only in their respective hosting countries of the United Kingdom, Russia, and Brazil (except for brief stops in the United States, Ireland, and Switzerland, respectively). In 2016, ten days before the beginning of the 2016 Summer Olympics in Rio de Janeiro, citizens of Angra dos Reis, a city near Rio de Janeiro, managed to extinguish the Olympic flame during a protest against the city spending money on hosting the Olympics despite an economic crisis in Brazil.

The Olympic torch relay in the host country ends with the lighting of the Olympic cauldron during the opening ceremony in the central host stadium of the Games. The final carrier is often kept unannounced until the last moment. Over the years, it has become a tradition to let a famous athlete of the host nation, former athletes or athletes with significant achievements and milestones be the last runner in the Olympic torch relay.

=== Re-igniting the flame ===
It is not uncommon for the Olympic flame to be accidentally or deliberately extinguished during the course of the torch relay (and on at least one occasion the cauldron itself has gone out during the Games). To guard against this eventuality, multiple copies of the flame are transported with the relay or maintained in backup locations. When a torch goes out, it is re-lit (or another torch is lit) from one of the backup sources. Thus, the fires contained in the torches and Olympic cauldrons all trace a common lineage back to the same Olympia lighting ceremony.

- One of the more memorable extinguishings occurred at the 1976 Summer Olympics held in Montreal, Quebec, Canada. After a rainstorm doused the Olympic flame a few days after the games had opened, an official re-lit the flame using a cigarette lighter. Organizers quickly doused it again and re-lit it using a backup of the original flame.
- At the 2004 Summer Olympics, when the Olympic flame came to the Panathinaiko Stadium to start the global torch relay, the night was very windy and the torch, lit by Gianna Angelopoulos-Daskalaki of the Athens 2004 Organizing Committee, blew out due to the wind, but was re-lit from the backup flame taken from the original flame lit at Olympia.
- In October 2013 in Russia, the Olympic flame was blown out at the Kremlin and was reignited from a security officer's lighter instead of the back up flame.

The design of 2004 had a safeguard built into it: There are two flames inside the torch. There is a highly visible (yellow flame) portion that burns cooler and is more prone to extinguish in wind and rain, but there is also a smaller hotter (blue in the candle's wick) flame akin to a pilot light hidden inside the torch which is protected from wind and rain and is capable of relighting the cooler, more visible portion if it is extinguished. The fuel contained inside the torch is able to keep it lit for approximately 15 minutes before it would be extinguished.

=== Selected relays in detail ===
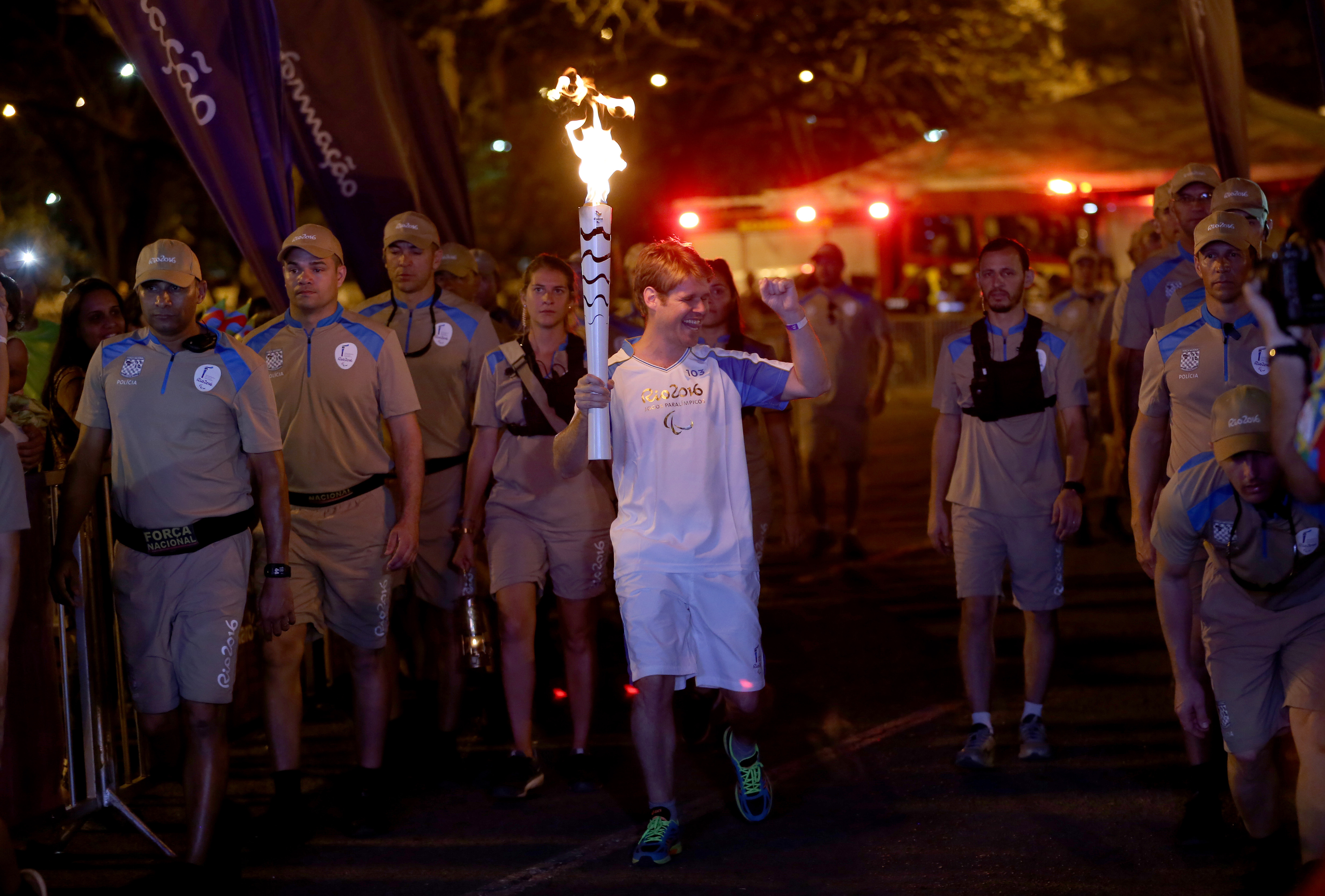
2016 Summer Paralympics torch relay

The flame is transported from Greece to the host country where the flame is transported by torch around the host nation to the main stadium.

=== Olympic cauldron lighting ===
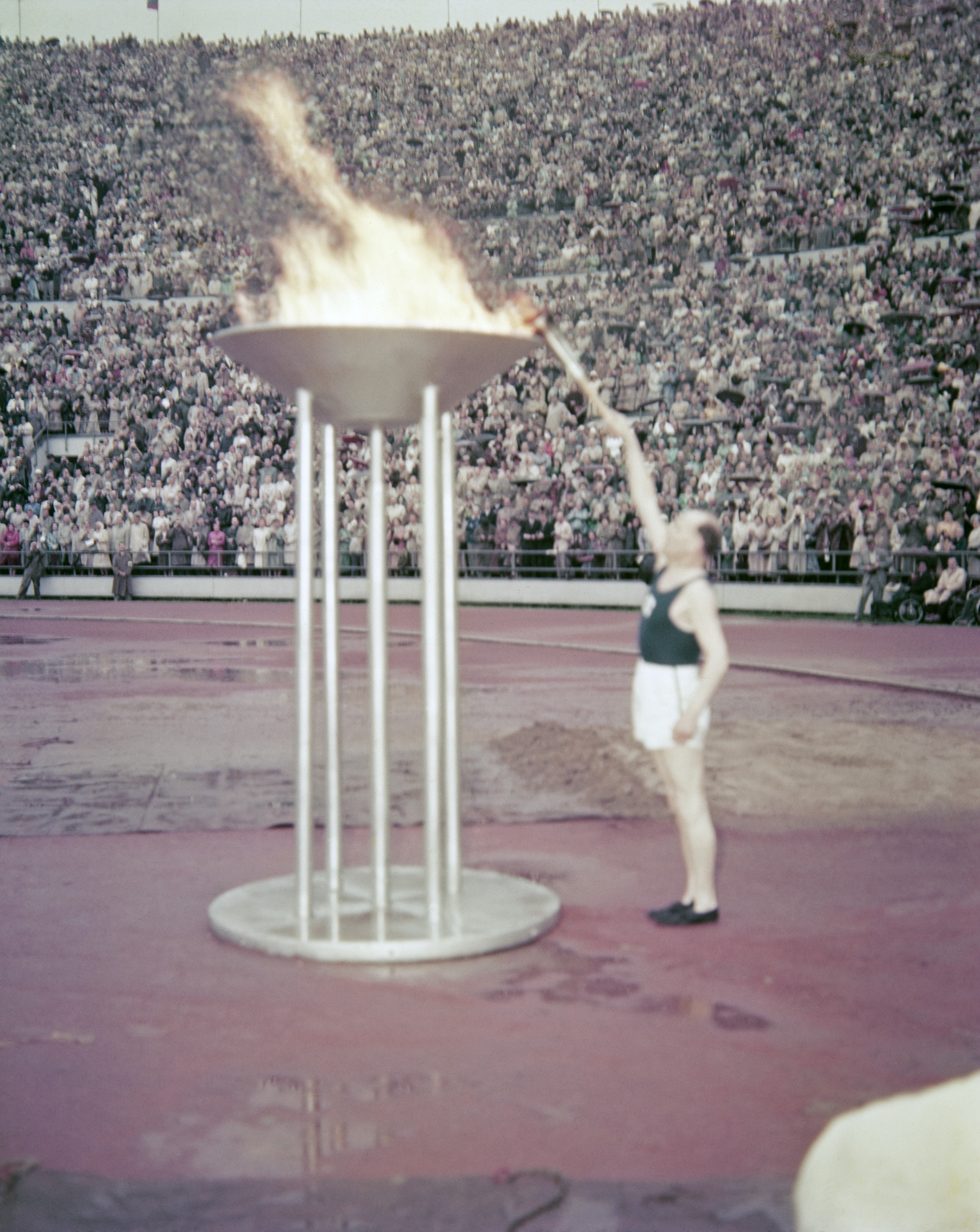
Paavo Nurmi lighting the Olympic flame in Helsinki in 1952

During the opening ceremony the final bearer of the torch runs towards the cauldron, often placed at the top of a grand staircase, and then uses the torch to start the flame in the stadium. The climactic transfer of the Olympic flame from the final torch to the cauldron at the central host stadium marks the symbolic commencement of the Games.

IOC protocol specifies that the lighting of the Olympic flame must be witnessed by the attendees of the opening ceremony, and should be visible to the residents of the host city.

As with being the final runner of the Olympic torch relay, it is considered to be a great honor to light the Olympic cauldron, and in the same way it has become a tradition to select notable athletes to conduct this part of the ceremony. On other occasions, the people who lit the cauldron in the stadium are not famous but nevertheless symbolize Olympic ideals. Japanese runner Yoshinori Sakai was born on the day of the atomic bombing of Hiroshima. He was chosen for the role to symbolize Japan's postwar reconstruction and peace, opening the 1964 Tokyo Games. At the 1976 Games in Montreal, two teenagers — one from the French-speaking part of the country, one from the English-speaking part — symbolized the unity of Canada.

At the 2012 Games in London, the torch was carried by Sir Steve Redgrave to a group of seven young British athletes (Callum Airlie, Jordan Duckitt, Desiree Henry, Katie Kirk, Cameron MacRitchie, Aidan Reynolds and Adelle Tracey) — each nominated by a British Olympic champion — who then each lit a single tiny flame on the ground, igniting 204 copper petals before they converged to form the cauldron for the Games.

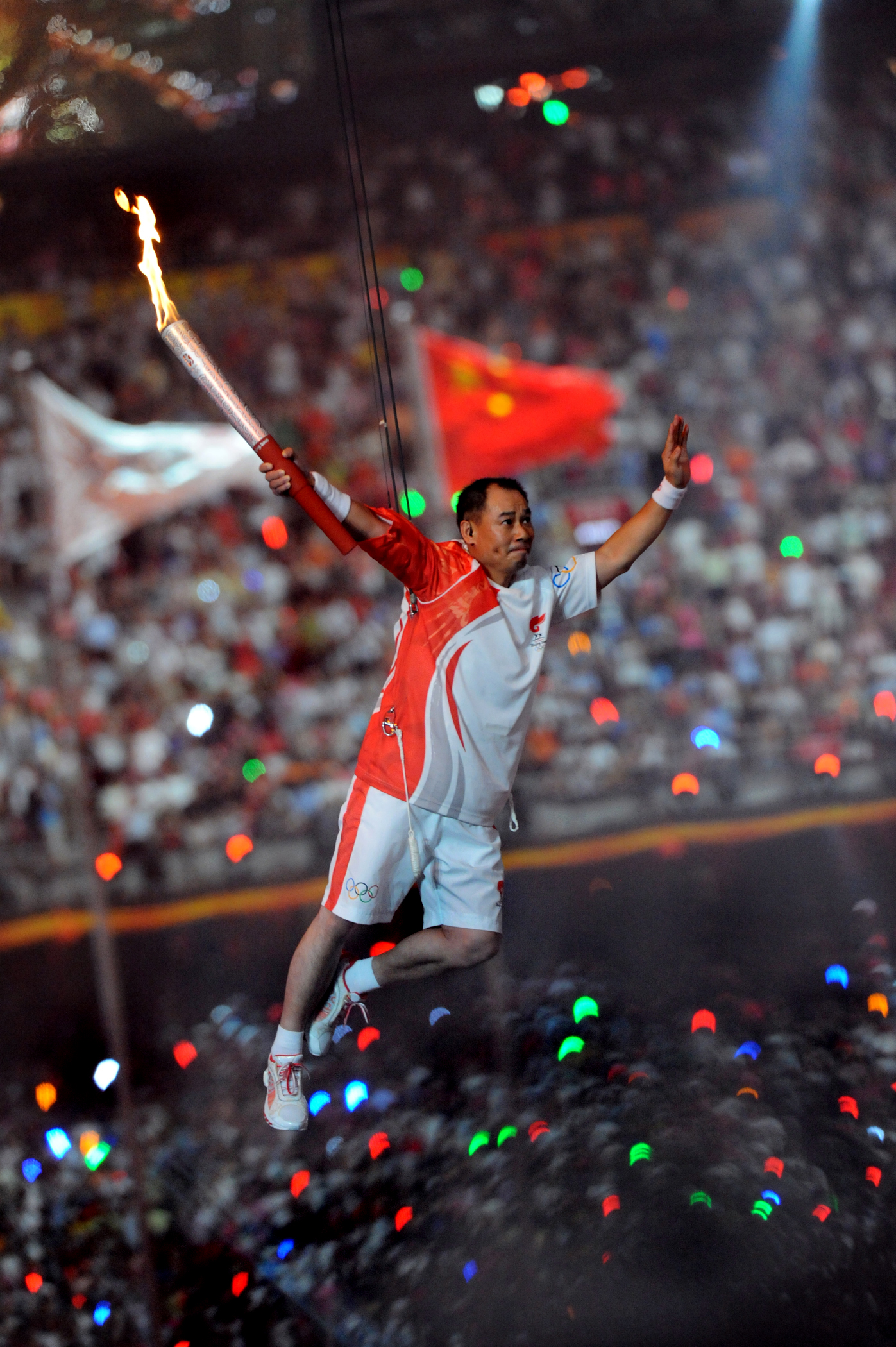
Li Ning, a Chinese gymnast, lit the Olympic flame during the opening ceremony of the 2008 Summer Olympics after "flying" around the stadium on wires.

The first well-known athlete to light the cauldron in the stadium was the ninefold Olympic Champion Paavo Nurmi, who excited the home crowd in Helsinki in 1952. In 1968, Enriqueta Basilio became the first woman to light the Olympic Cauldron at the Olympic Games in Mexico City.

Perhaps one of the most spectacular of Olympic cauldron lighting ceremonies took place at the 1992 Summer Olympics opening ceremony, when Paralympic archer Antonio Rebollo lit the cauldron by shooting a burning arrow over it, which ignited gas rising from the cauldron, although there are theories that the cauldron was manually forced to ignite. Two years later, the Olympic fire was brought into the stadium of Lillehammer by a ski jumper. In Beijing 2008, Li Ning "ran" on air around the interior edge of the Beijing National Stadium's roof, and lit a cauldron attached to it.

=== Olympic cauldron designs ===
The cauldron and the pedestal are always the subjects of unique and often dramatic design. These also tie in with how the cauldron is lit during the Opening Ceremony. After being lit, the flame in the Olympic cauldron continues to burn during the Games, until the closing ceremony, when it is finally put out symbolizing the official end of the Games.

- In Los Angeles in 1984, Rafer Johnson lit a wick at the top of the archway after having climbed a big flight of steps. The flame flared up a pipe, through the Olympic Rings, and on up the side of the tower to ignite the cauldron. The cauldron used in 1984 is the centerpiece of the Los Angeles Memorial Coliseum; it was used in 1932 and will likely also be used in 2028.
- In Atlanta in 1996, the cauldron was an artistic scroll decorated in red and gold. It was lit by Muhammad Ali, using a mechanical, self-propelling fuse ball that transported the flame up a wire from the stadium to its cauldron. At the 1996 Summer Paralympics, the scroll was lit by paraplegic climber Mark Wellman, hoisting himself up a rope to the cauldron.
- At the 2000 Summer Olympics in Sydney, the cauldron was initially concealed in a circular pool of water. Cathy Freeman used the torch to ignite a ring of fire around her, which then rose from the pool to reveal the cauldron. It ascended up a waterfall to the roof of the stadium, where it rested in its final position on a pedestal. A technical glitch caused the sequence to unexpectedly halt, resulting in the cauldron being suspended above Freeman for several minutes while engineers overrode the conveyor system.
- At the 2002 Winter Olympics in Salt Lake City, the cauldron was lit by the members of the gold medal-winning U.S. men's ice hockey team from the 1980 Winter Olympics. The flame was carried up a staircase to the team members, who then lit a wick of sorts at the bottom of the cauldron tower which set off a line of flames that travelled up inside the tower until it reached the cauldron at the top which ignited. This cauldron was the first to use glass and incorporated running water to prevent the glass from heating, and make it resemble melting ice.
- For the 2004 Summer Olympics in Athens, the cauldron was a giant reproduction of the Olympic torch that year which was based on an olive leaf; it bowed down to accept the flame from windsurfer Nikolaos Kaklamanakis.
- In the 2006 Winter Olympics in Turin, Stefania Belmondo placed the flame on an arched lighting apparatus, which initiated a series of fireworks before lighting the top of the 57-metre-high (187 ft) Olympic cauldron, the highest in the history of the Winter Olympic Games.
- In the 2008 Summer Olympics in Beijing, the cauldron resembled the end of a scroll and it was also a giant version of the torch used in that year's relay. But the design was lifted out from the stadium rim and spiralled upwards. It was lit by Li Ning, who was raised to the rim of the stadium by wires. He ran around the rim of the stadium while suspended and as he ran, an unrolling scroll was projected showing film clips of the flame's journey around the world from Greece to Beijing. As he approached the cauldron, he lit an enormous wick, which then transferred the flame to the cauldron. The flame then spiralled up the structure of the cauldron before lighting it at the top.
- At the 2010 Winter Olympics in Vancouver, the cauldron consisted of four ice crystal-like "arms" that emerged from the stadium floor, converging around a central pillar. The cauldron was to be lit simultaneously by Canadian athletes Catriona Le May Doan, Steve Nash, Nancy Greene, and Wayne Gretzky. However, a technical glitch caused only three of the four arms to emerge, inadvertently leaving out Le May Doan. As the ceremonies were held inside BC Place—then a domed stadium—the lighting of the flame was not in view of the public as recommended by Olympic protocol. Due to this, a second, permanent cauldron was secretly constructed in Jack Poole Plaza, with Gretzky escorted there to light the cauldron following the conclusion of the opening ceremony.
- At the 2012 Summer Olympics in London, the flame was passed to a group of seven young British athletes (Callum Airlie, Jordan Duckitt, Desiree Henry, Katie Kirk, Cameron MacRitchie, Aidan Reynolds, and Adelle Tracey) who then each lit a single tiny flame on the ground, igniting 204 copper petals (one for each delegation in the Games) that rose up on narrow black pipes to form a single cauldron. The cauldron was temporarily extinguished (the flame itself was transferred to a lantern) prior to the athletics events while it was moved to the southern side of the stadium. It was relit by Austin Playfoot, one of the final torchbearers from the 1948 Summer Olympics. Due to its placement on the stadium floor, the cauldron was not visible to the public outside the stadium; footage of the flame was displayed on screens in the stadium and Olympic Park.
- For the 2014 Winter Olympics in Sochi, Russia, the cauldron was situated directly outside Fisht Olympic Stadium, the ceremonial venue for the Games. After the torch's lap around the stadium, triple gold medalists Irina Rodnina and Vladislav Tretiak carried the torch outside the stadium to light a larger version of the "celebration cauldron" used in the main torch relay at the center of the Olympic Park. A line of gas jets carried the flame from the celebration cauldron up the main cauldron tower, eventually lighting it at the top.
- For the 2016 Summer Olympics in Rio de Janeiro, Brazil, the cauldron was lit inside Maracanã Stadium by Vanderlei de Lima, consisting of a small cauldron illuminating a larger kinetic sculpture designed by Anthony Howe. A second, permanent cauldron at Candelária Church Plaza was lit by a youth ambassador following the opening ceremony; the Maracanã was not being used as a competition venue for the majority of the Games.
- For the 2018 Winter Olympics in Pyeongchang, South Korea, the flame was eventually handed to Yuna Kim, who was at the top of a set of steps. She then lit a wick of sorts, which lit a large metal flaming pillar with thirty parts, representing the 30 years since Seoul 1988 as a time tunnel between the two Olympic Games held in the Republic of Korea. The pillar rose to the top of the cauldron, lighting it. The cauldron was a large sphere on the top, nested inside a white sculpture. The cauldron's design was inspired by Joseon white porcelain.
- For the 2020 Summer Olympics in Tokyo, the flame was handed to Naomi Osaka, who stood in front of a large mountain-like structure resembling Mount Fuji. At the top of the mountain was a large closed ball, resembling the sun. This ball unfolded, revealing many petals of a flower representing hope, energy and vitality, forming the cauldron. Osaka then walked up a set of steps revealed as the ball unfolded and lit the cauldron. As with the Vancouver and Rio games, two cauldrons were made. One scenographic was located inside the Olympic stadium and the official outside, which was located on the Ariake West Canal bridge.
- The 2022 Winter Olympics in Beijing eschewed a cauldron entirely; the final torchbearers Zhao Jiawen and Dilnigar Ilhamjan instead fitted the final torch into a pedestal at the centre of a large sculpture of a snowflake, constructed from placards with the names of each competing team. There were three of these displays to reflect the three venue zones, with one at Beijing National Stadium for the Olympic Green, and two more at Yanqing and Zhangjiakou respectively.
- For the 2024 Summer Olympics in Paris, the cauldron took the form of a tethered balloon at the Tuileries Garden in Paris, in honour of France's historical contributions to balloon flight. For the first time, the cauldron did not contain a flame at all, instead utilizing water mist illuminated by LED lighting to simulate the flame. The Olympic flame proper was kept in a lantern stored near the gardens. In a segment at the start of the closing ceremony, the lights were turned off, and the lantern was taken to Stade de France by French swimmer Léon Marchand from Jardins des Tuileries. After the Games were declared closed, the lantern's flame was blown out.
- At the 2026 Winter Olympics, cauldrons were located at the Arco della Pace in Milan and the Piazza Angelo Dibona in Cortina d'Ampezzo to reflect the Games' two host cities; the Milan cauldron was lit by Deborah Compagnoni and Alberto Tomba, while Sofia Goggia lit the Cortina cauldron. The cauldrons consisted of a knot inspired by the work of Leonardo da Vinci, with the flame encased in a metal and glass compartment at the centre of the sculpture. The cauldrons are capable of a light and sound show, while the Milan cauldron is also a kinetic sculpture suspended in the gate, capable of expanding and contracting.
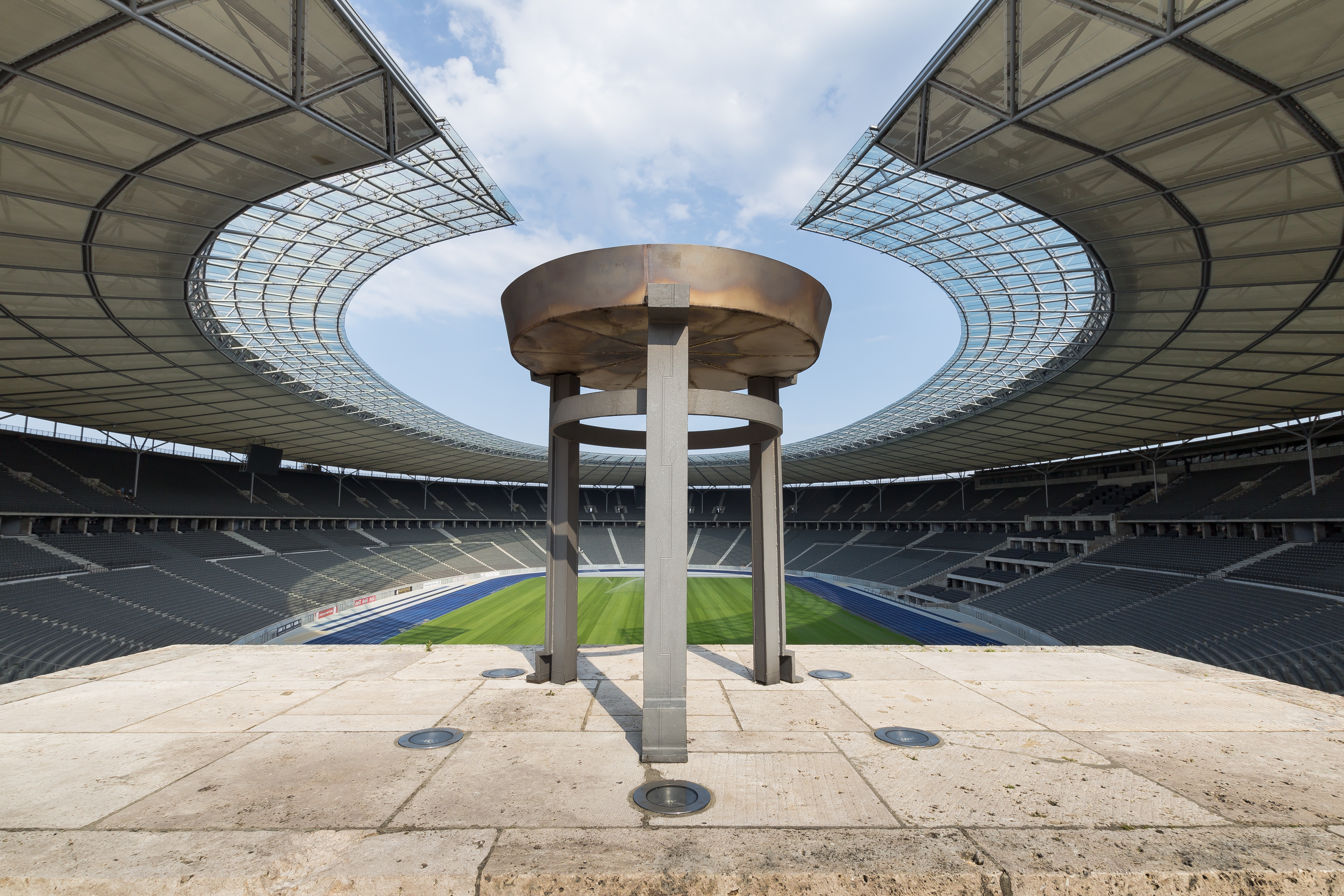
Traditional Olympic cauldrons often employ a simple bowl-on-pedestal design, such as the cauldron used for the 1936 Summer Olympics.

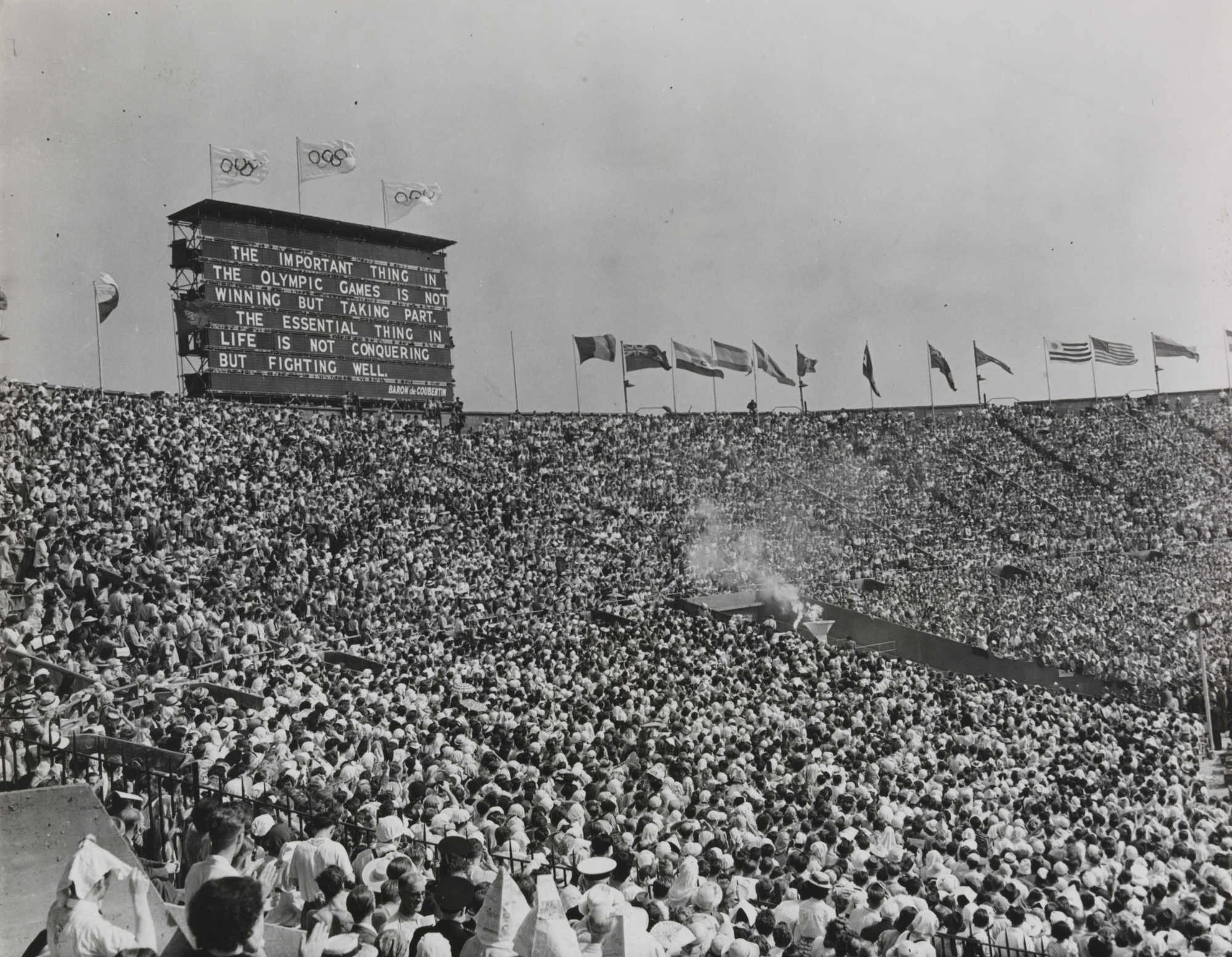
Olympic cauldron at London 1948.

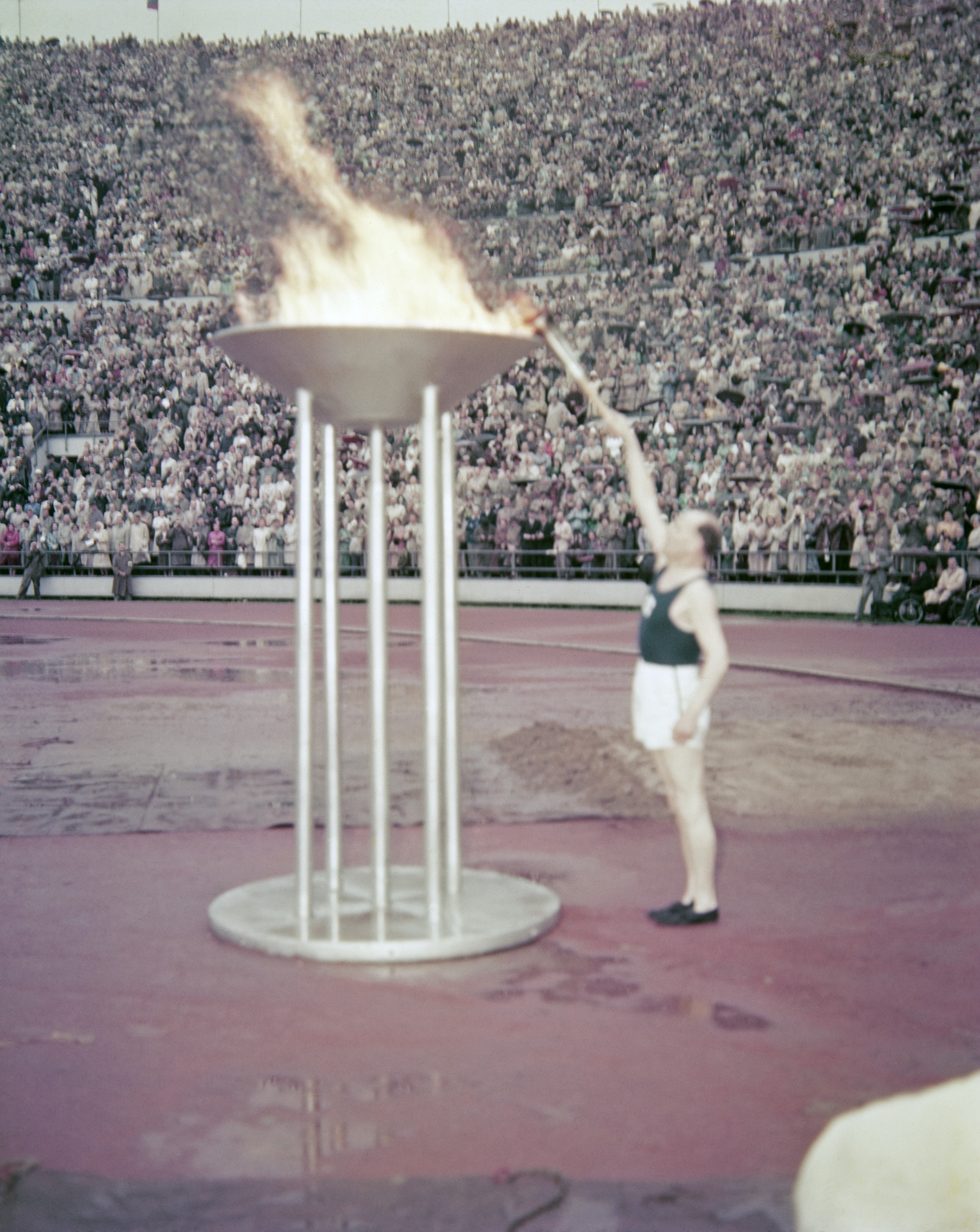
Olympic cauldron at Helsinki 1952.

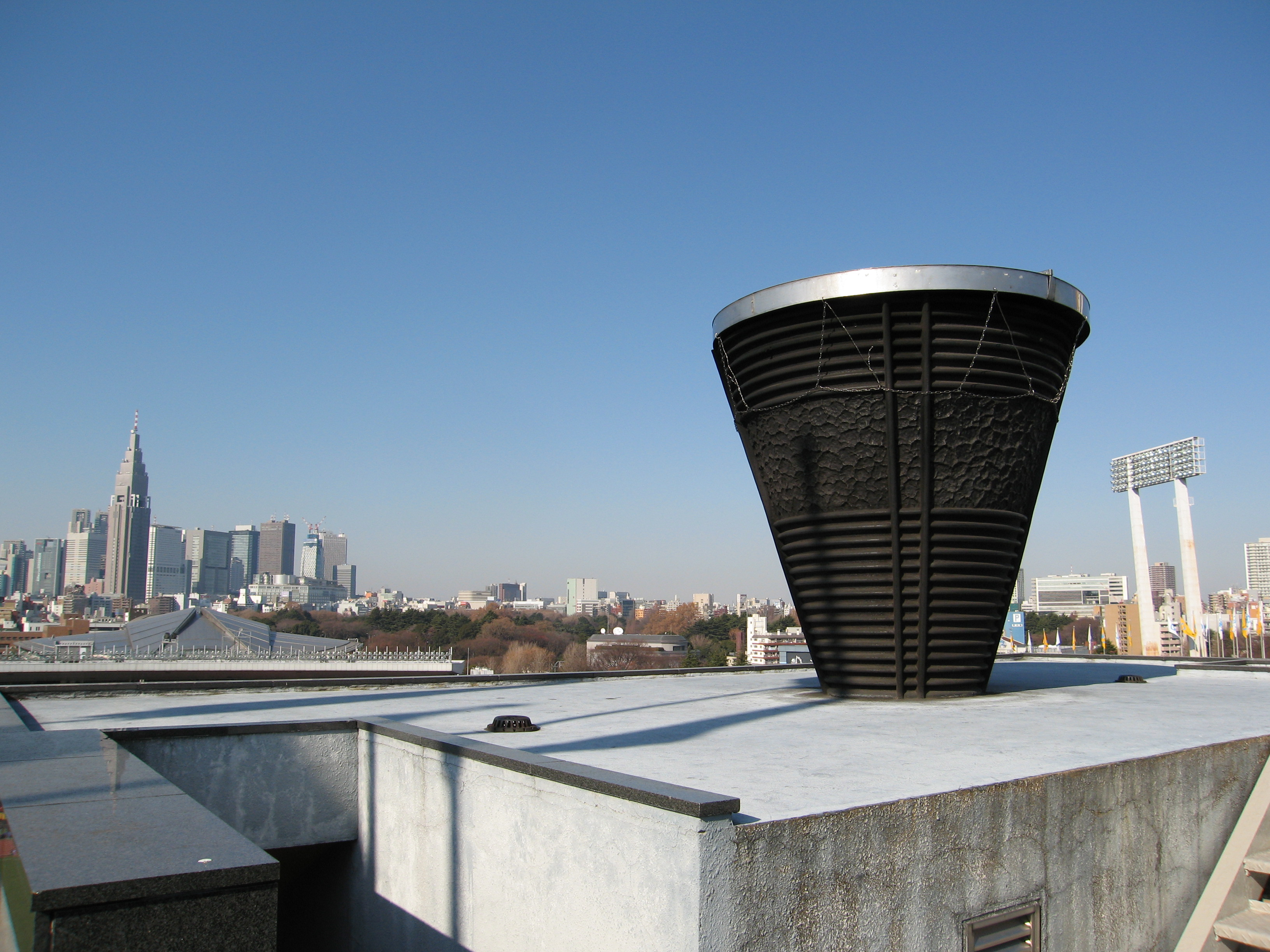
Olympic cauldron at Tokyo 1964.

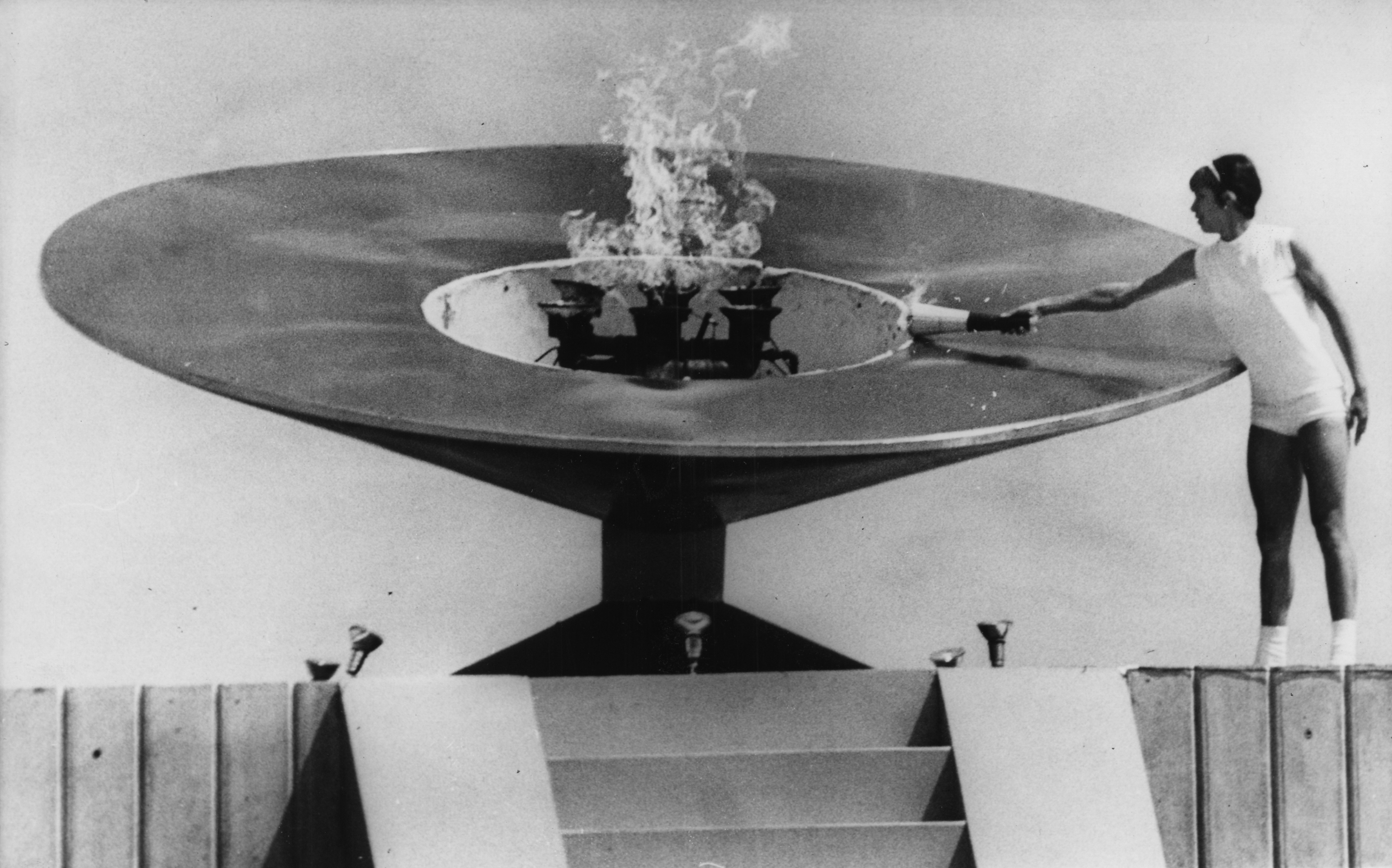
Olympic cauldron at Mexico 1968.

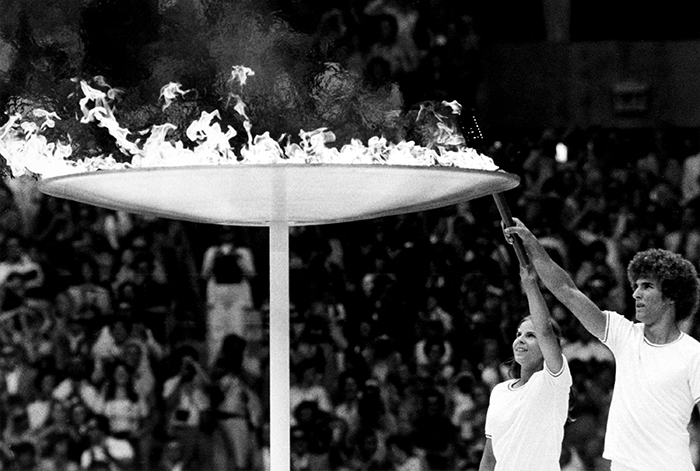
Olympic cauldron at Montreal 1976.

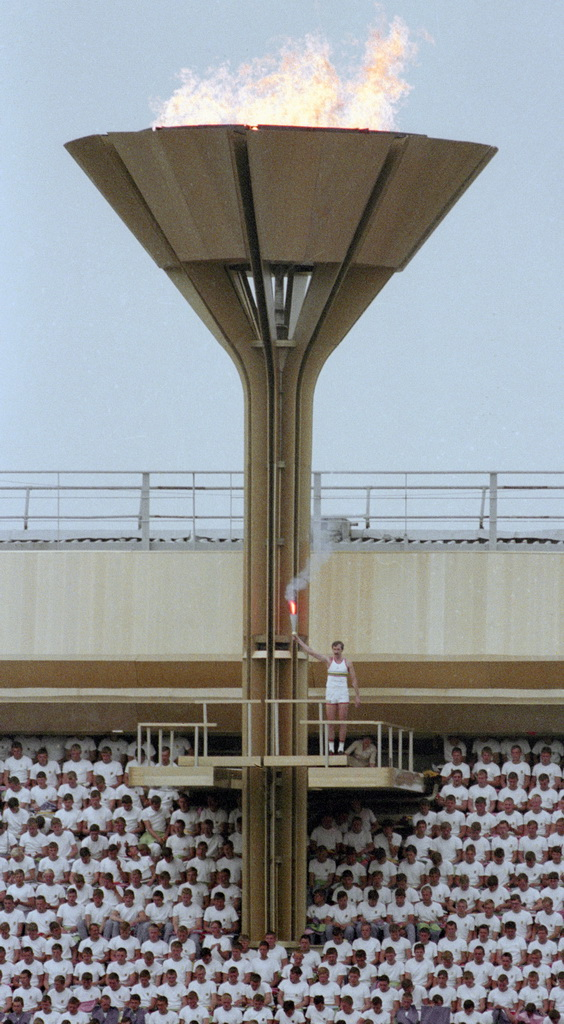
Olympic cauldron at Moscow 1980.

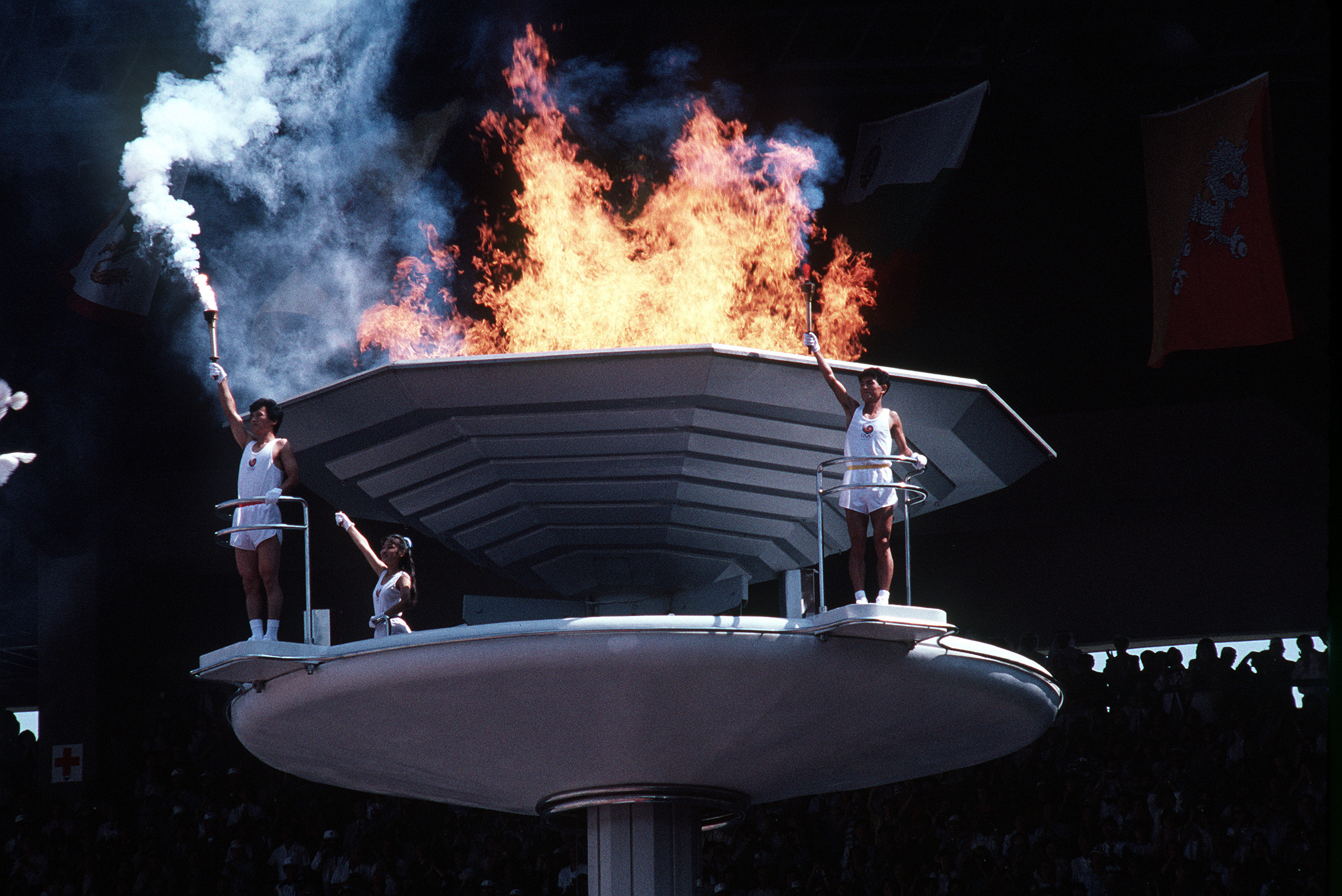
Kim Won-tak (athlete), Chong Son-man (teacher) and Son Mi-jong (dance student) during the lighting of the Olympic cauldron at 1988 Summer Olympics

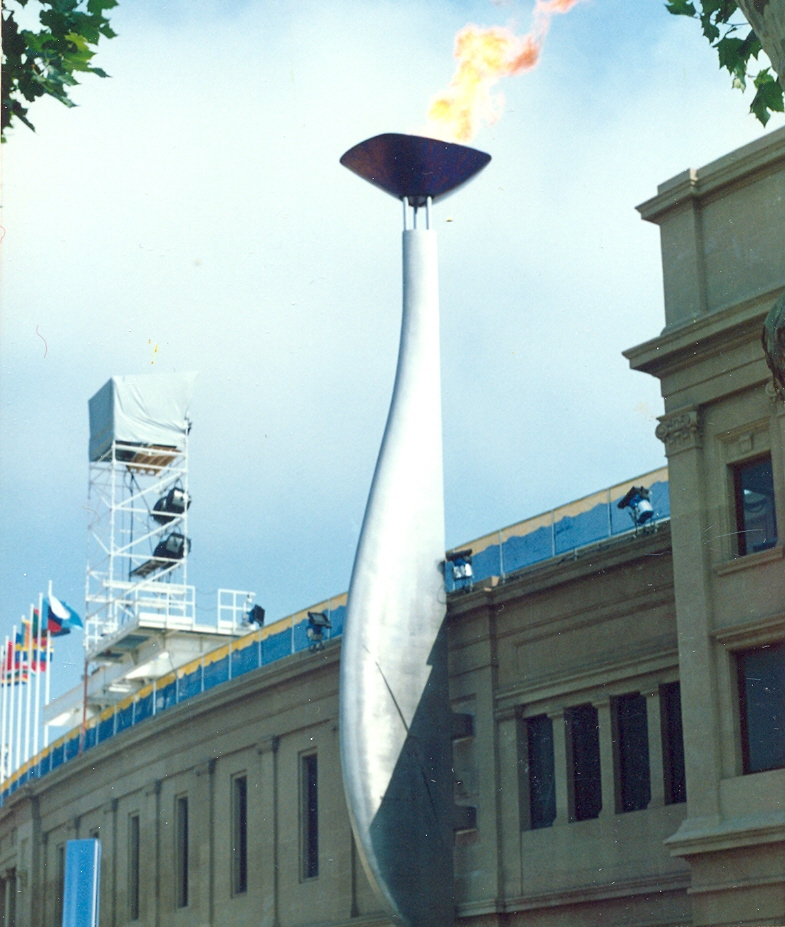
Olympic cauldron at 1992 Summer Olympics.

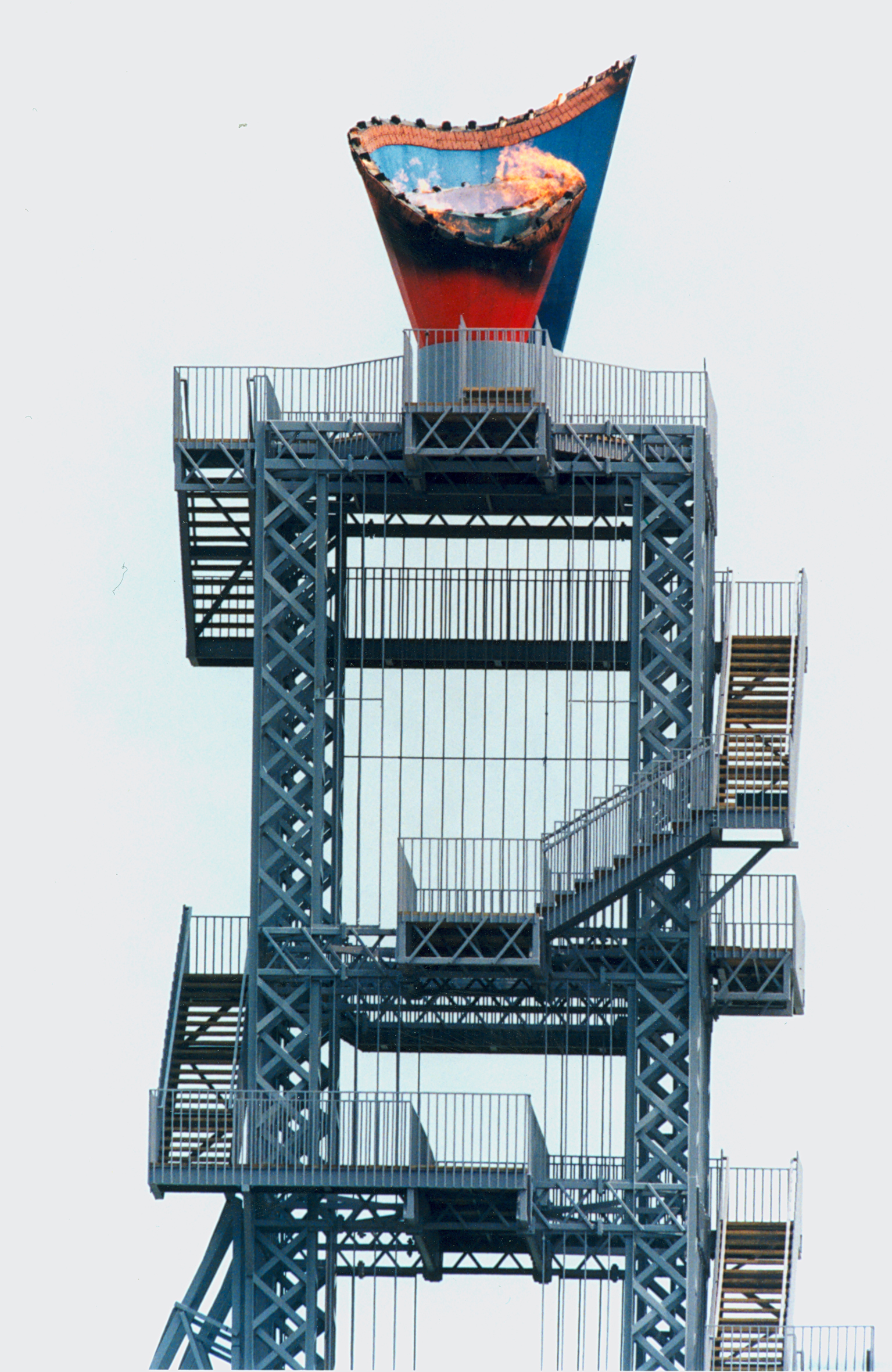
Olympic and Paralympic cauldron at Atlanta 1996 Games

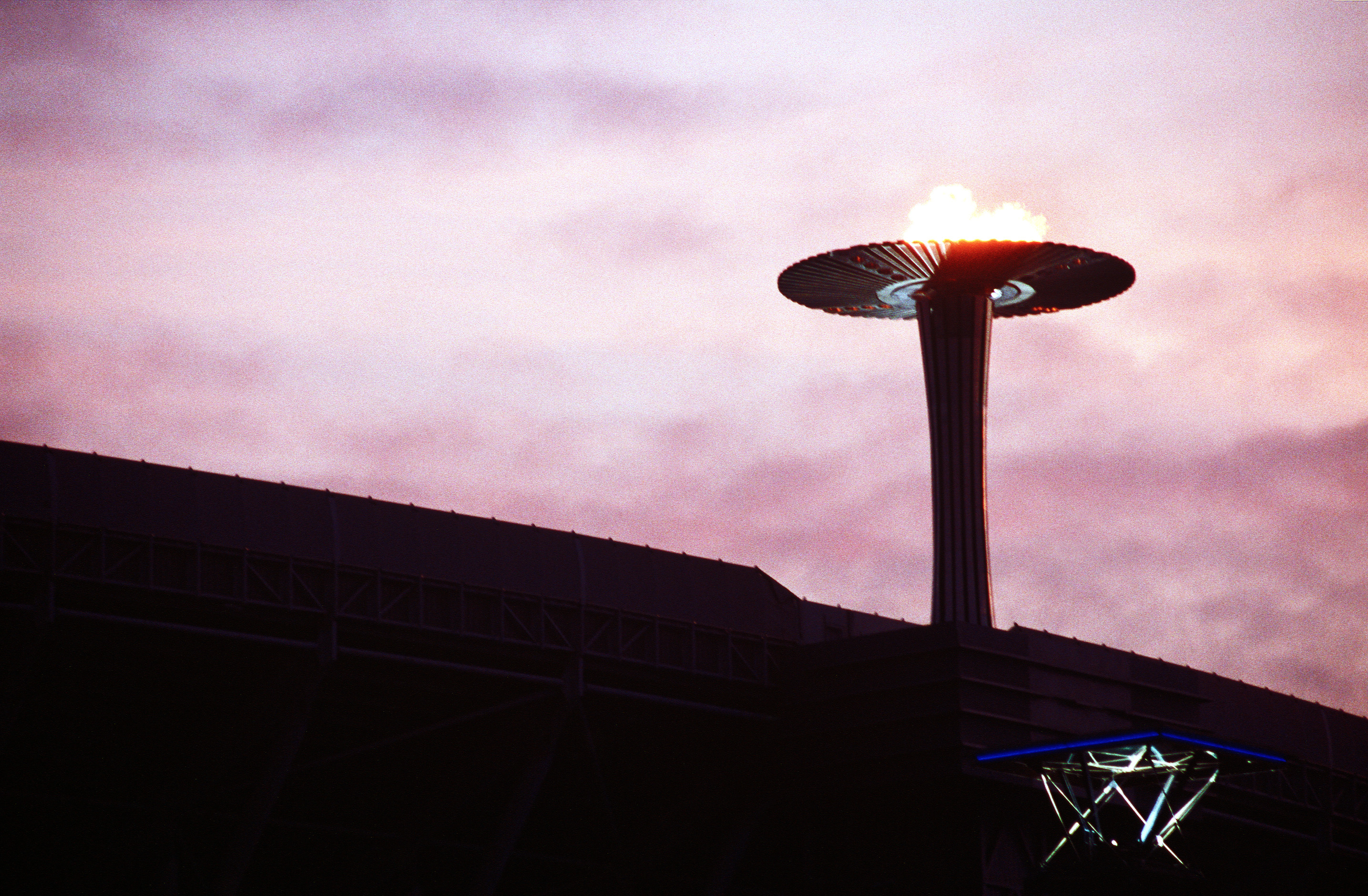
2000 Summer Olympics cauldron in Sydney, Australia.

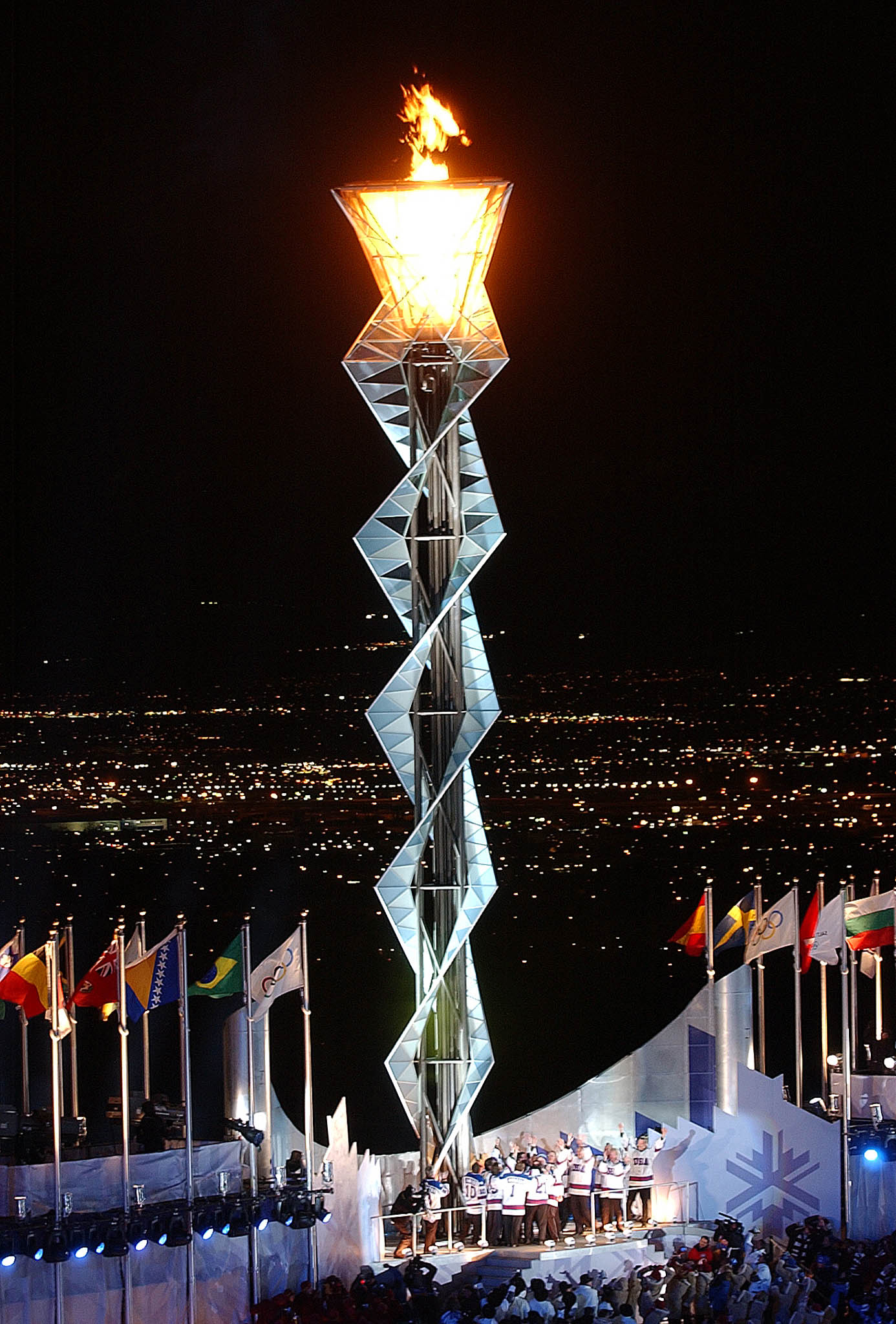
2002 Winter Olympics cauldron in Salt Lake City, Utah.

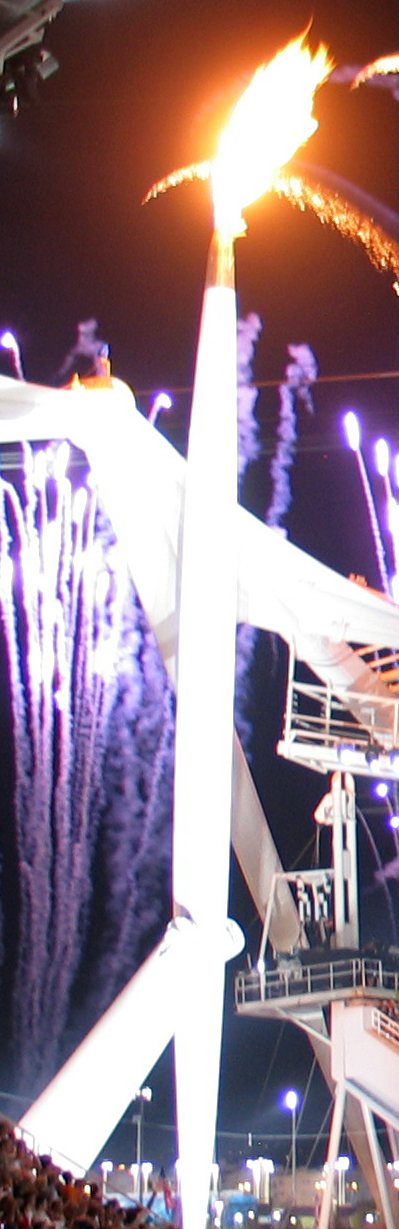
2004 Summer Olympics cauldron during the opening ceremony at the 2004 Summer Olympics in Athens, Greece.

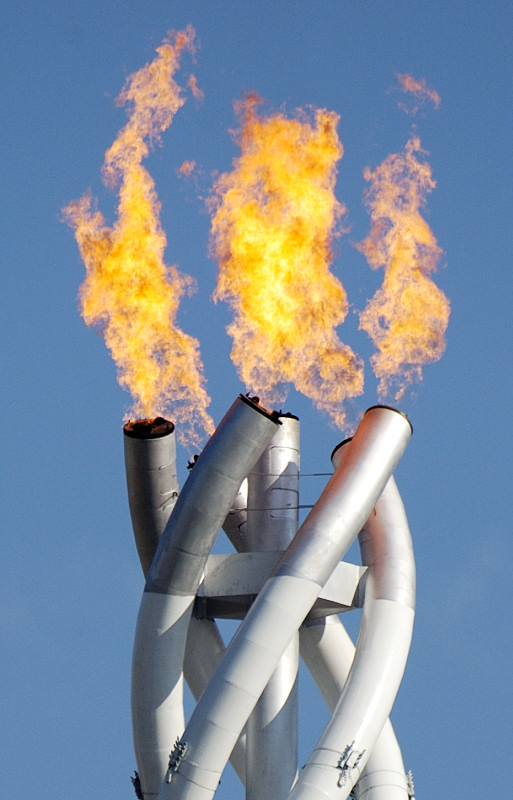
Olympic cauldron at Turin 2006.

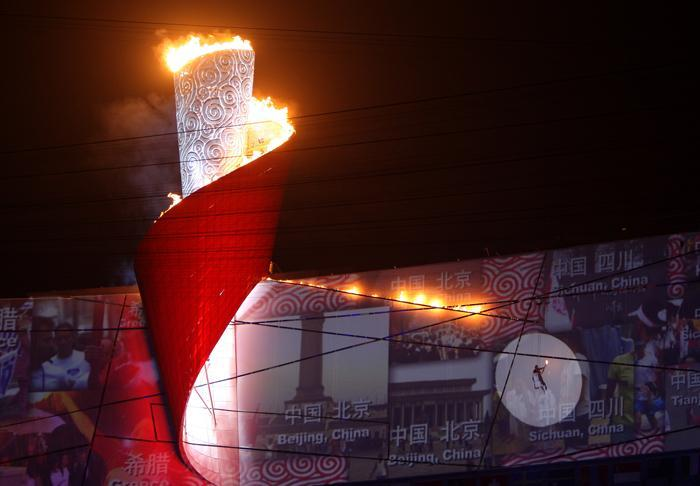
Olympic Cauldron at Beijing 2008 during the opening ceremony.

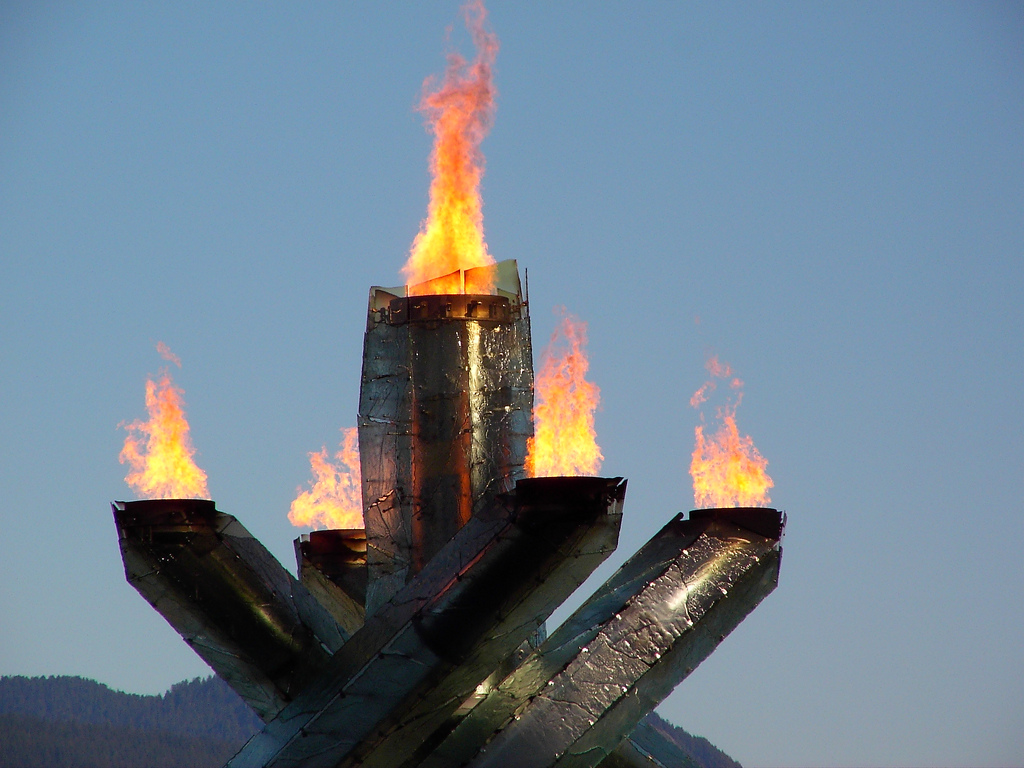
Public Cauldron of Vancouver 2010.

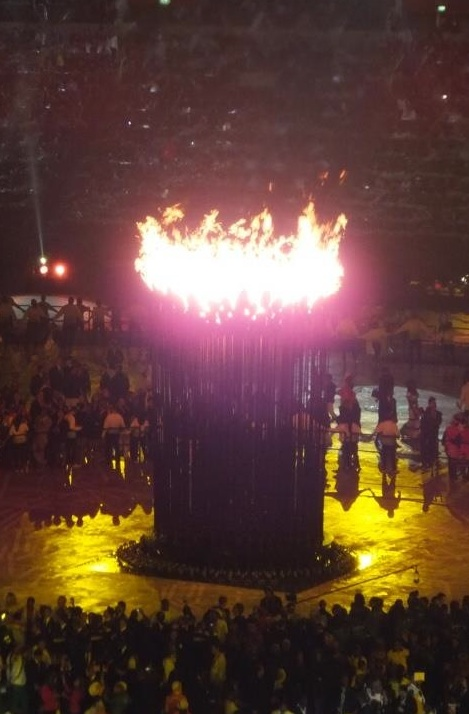
More artistic and abstract designs for cauldrons, including the 2012 Summer Olympics cauldron, have also been used.

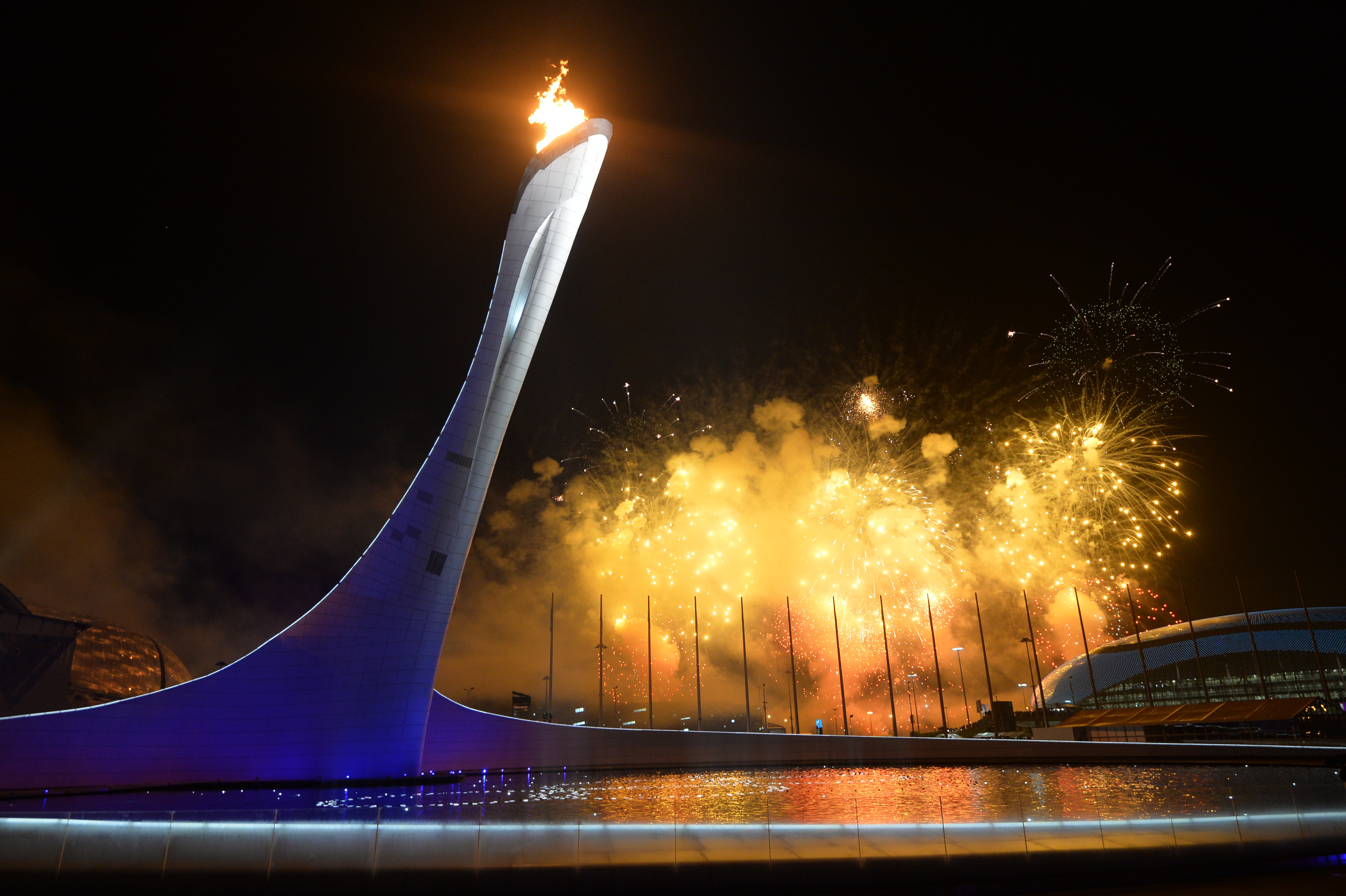
Cauldrons can also take on monolithic forms, an example of which being the "cauldron tower" used for Sochi 2014.

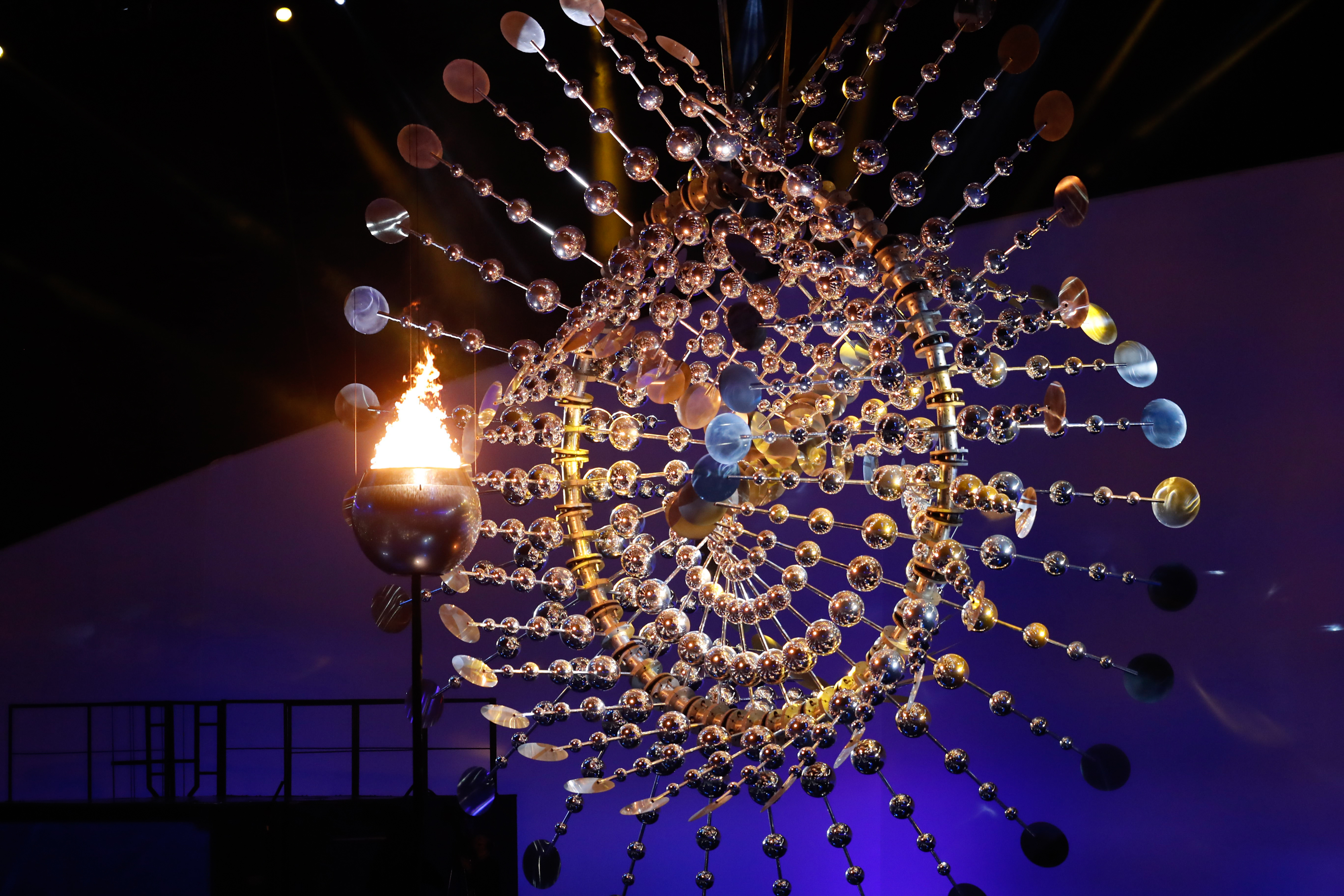
The Rio 2016 Games had an innovative cauldron, which featured a kinetic sculpture with a small flame.

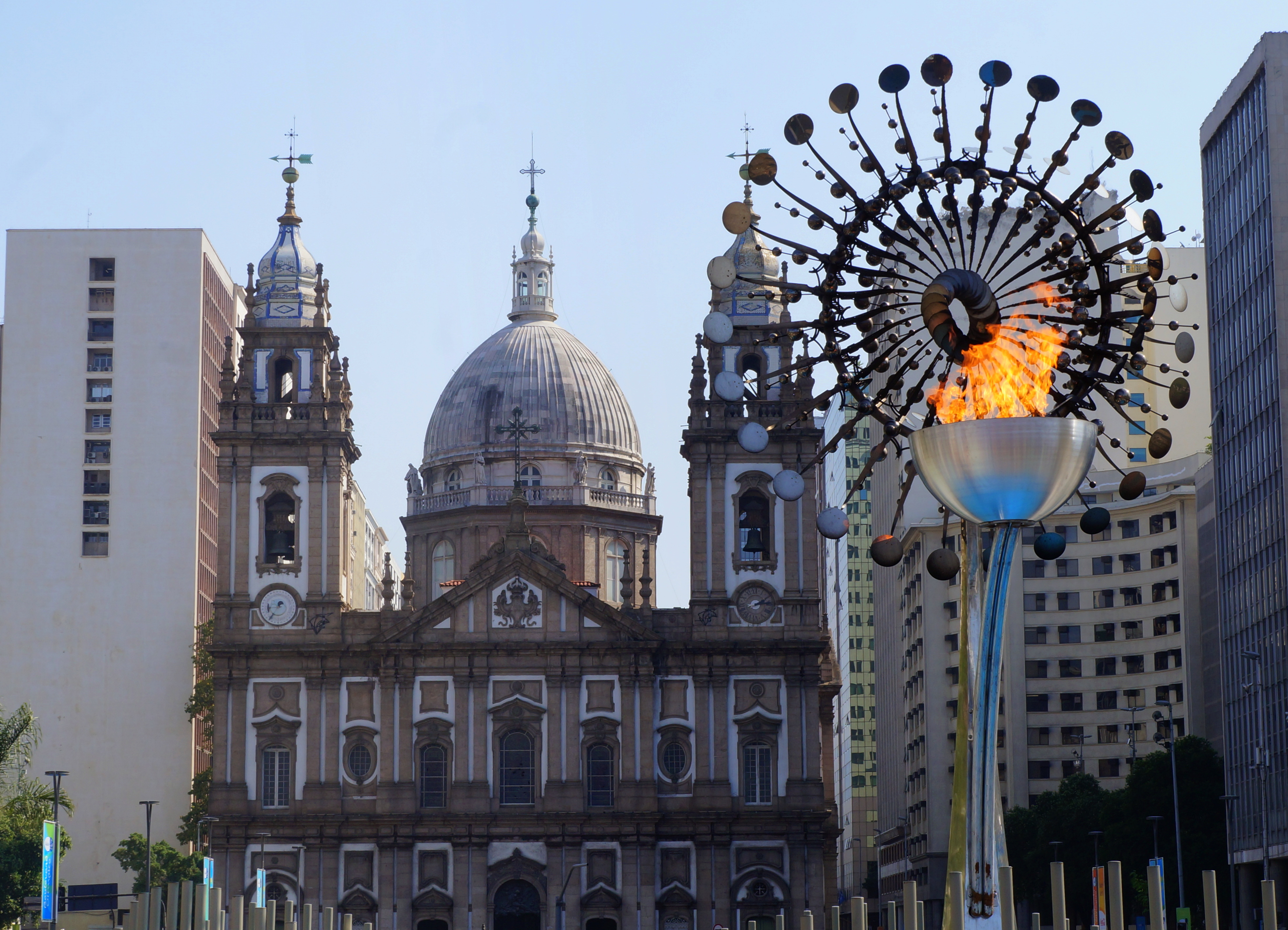
2016 public cauldron in downtown Rio de Janeiro.

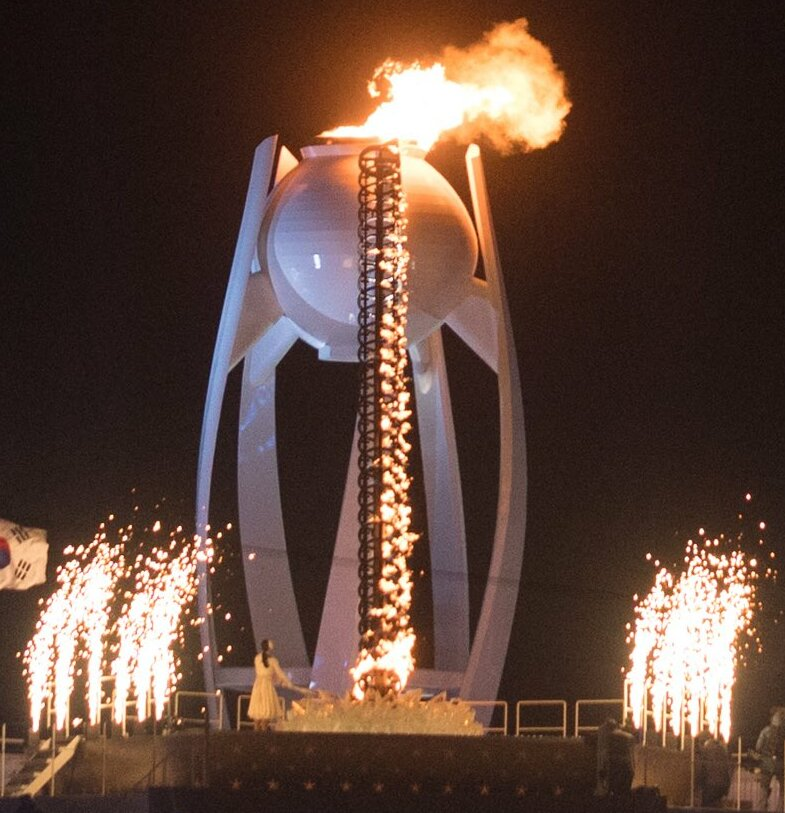
2018 Winter Olympics Cauldron in Pyeongchang, South Korea.

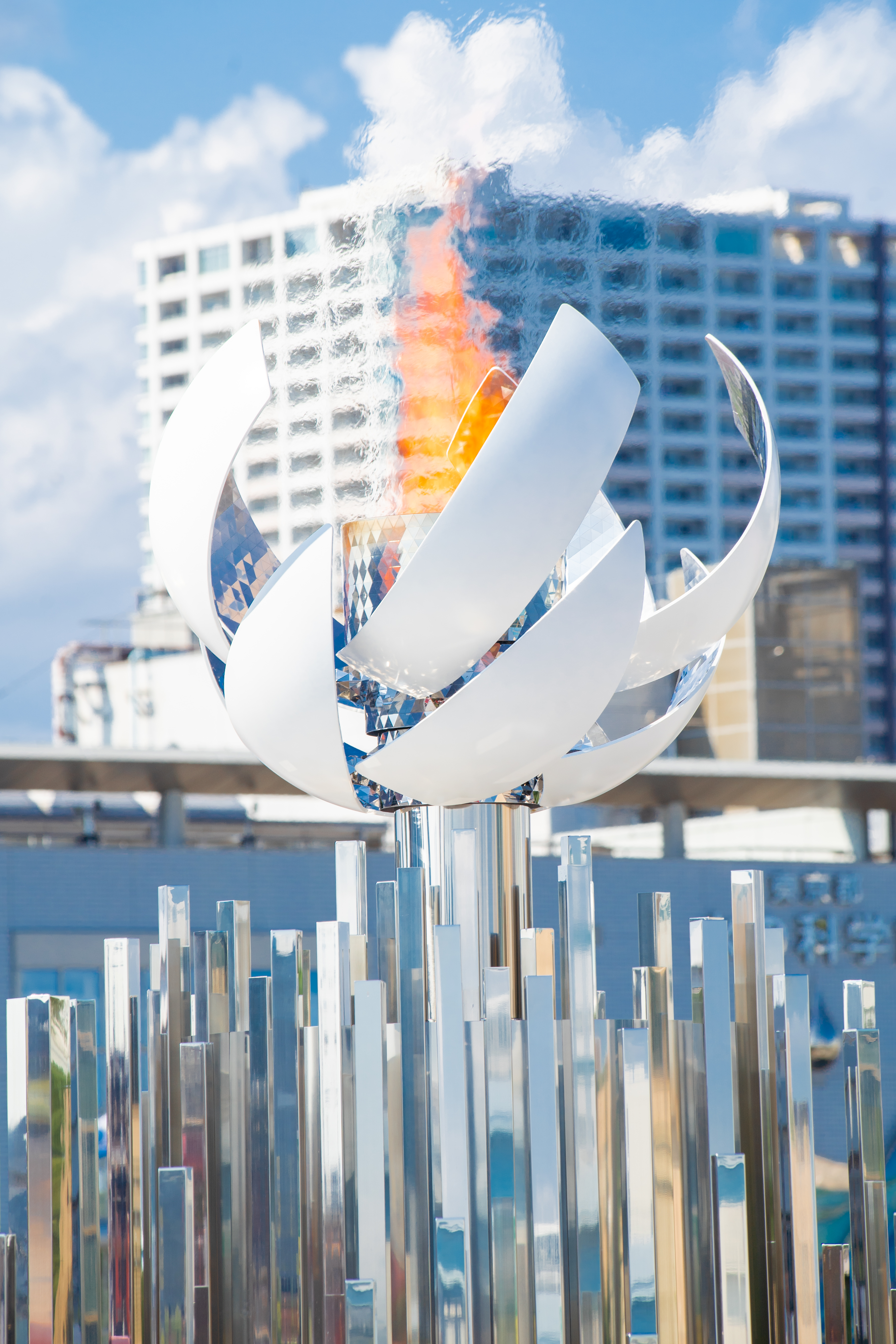
2020 Summer Olympics Cauldron in Tokyo.

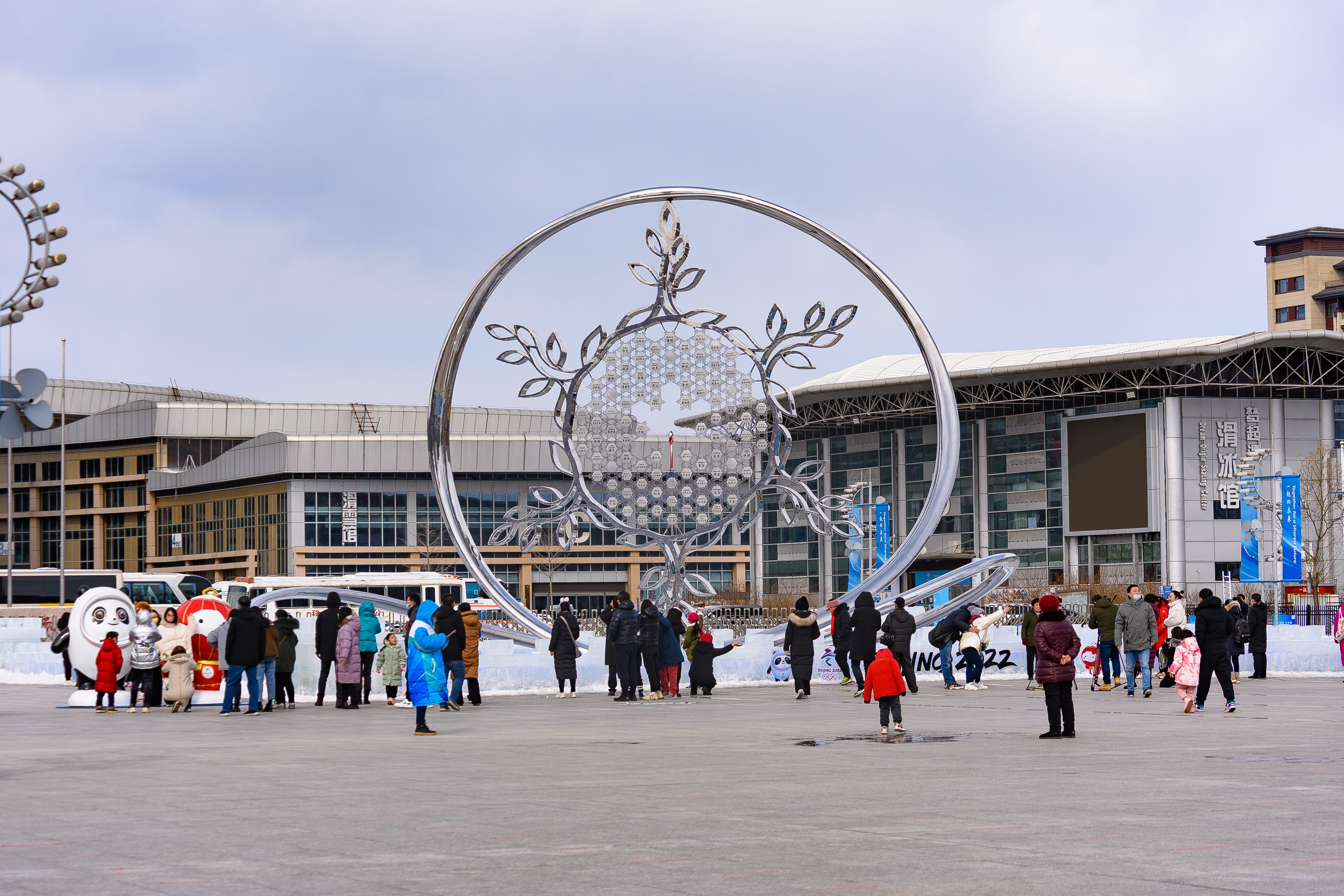
One of the three public flames of Beijing 2022.

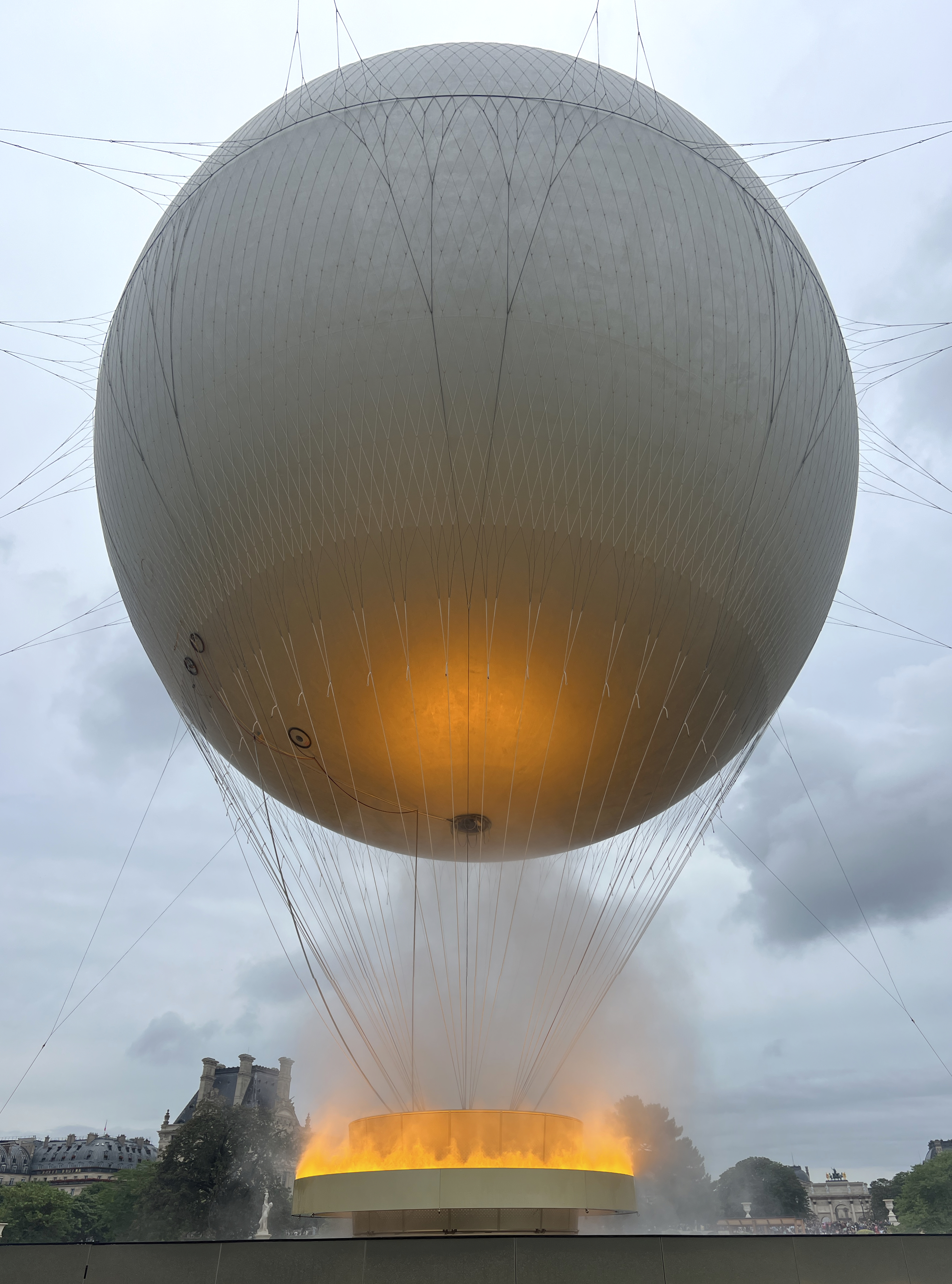
2024 Summer Olympics and Paralympics Cauldron in Paris.

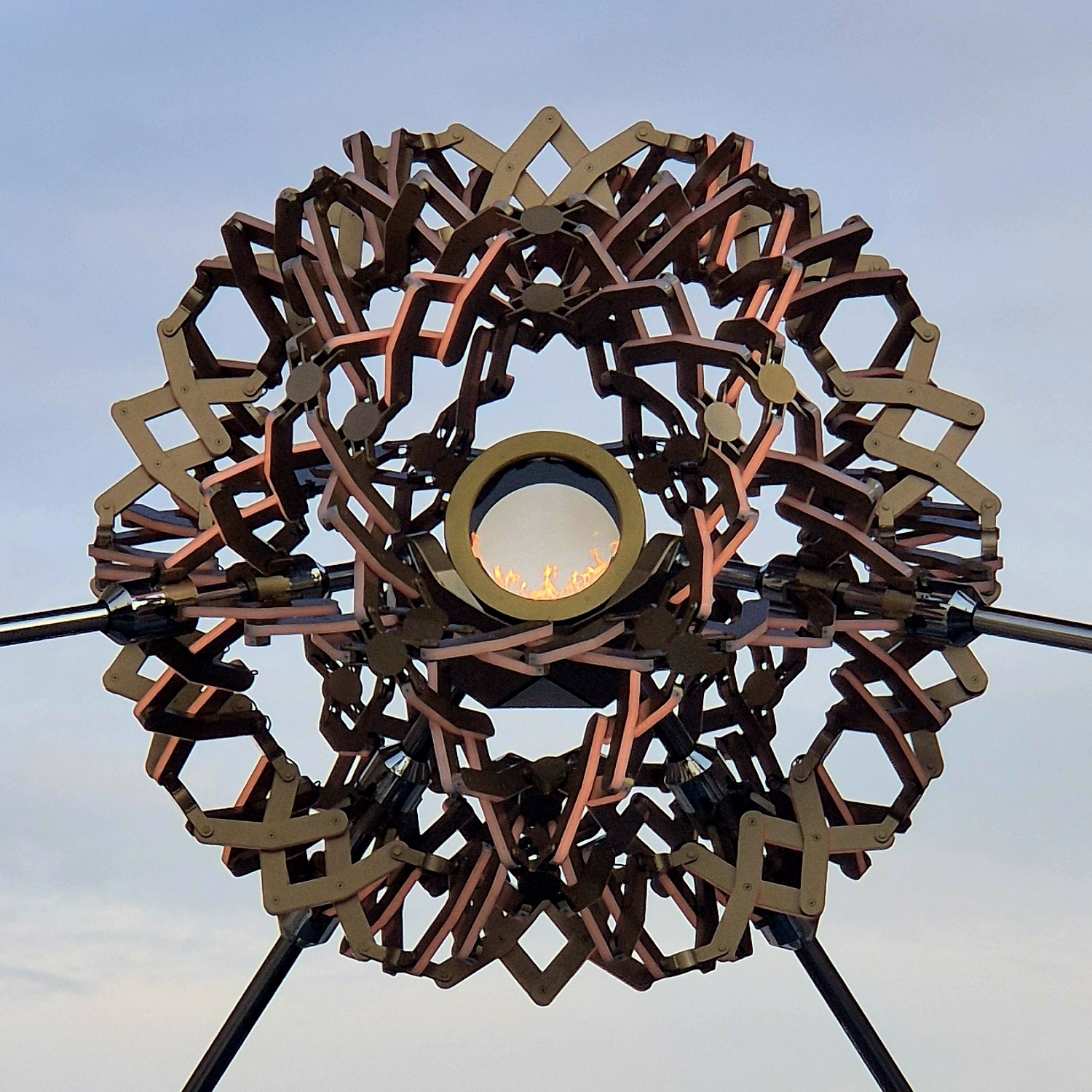
2026 Winter Olympics Cauldron in Milan.

== Coinage ==
The Olympic flame has been used as a symbol and a main motif numerous times in different commemorative coins. A recent example was the 50th anniversary of the Helsinki Olympic Games commemorative coin, minted in 2002. In the obverse, the Olympic flame above the Earth can be seen. Finland is the only country highlighted; it was the host of the 1952 games.

== Commercialization ==
Prior to the 2002 Winter Olympics, professor Bob Barney co-authored the book Selling the Five Rings (2002), with Stephen Wenn and Scott Martyn, which discussed the history of corporate sponsorships and television rights for the Olympic Games. Barney argued that the Olympic torch had been commercialized since its inception in 1936, and that sponsors of the torch relay benefit from brand awareness; whereas the medal podium ceremonies which began in 1932, had not become commercialized since no advertising is allowed inside Olympic venues.

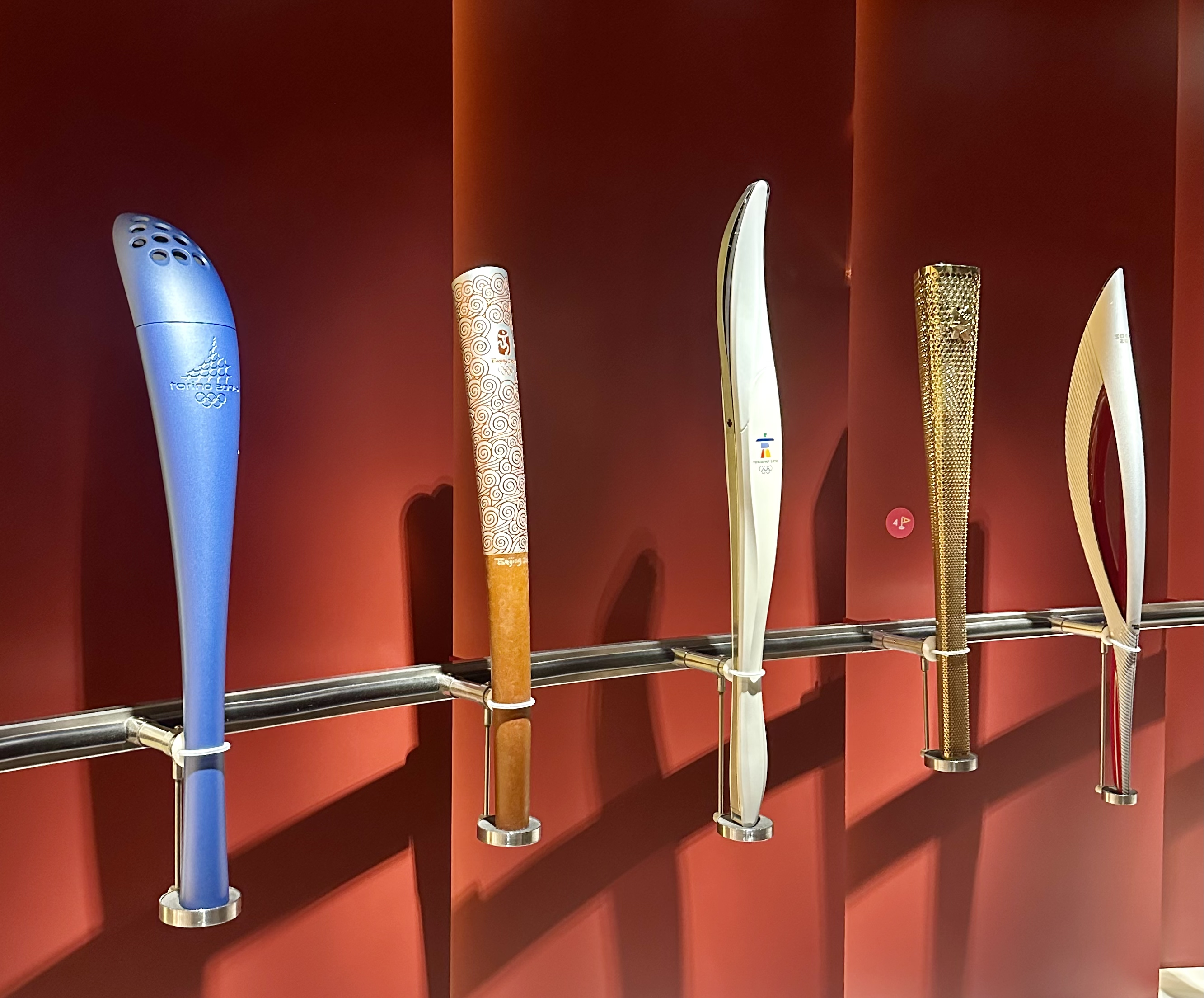

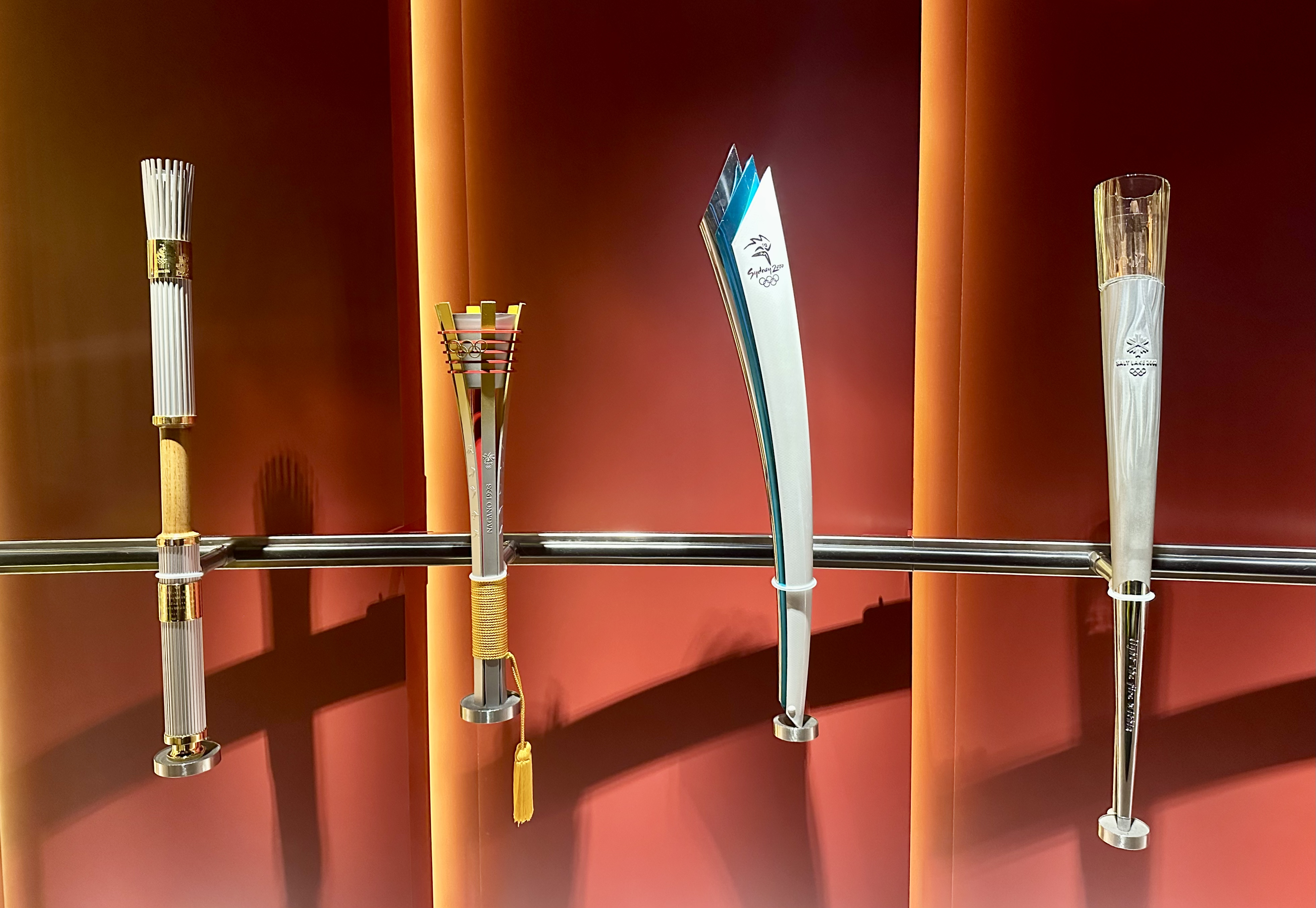

Olympic torches displayed inside the Olympic Museum in Lausanne, Switzerland

== See also ==
- Eternal flame
- Paralympic Flame
- Flame of Hope (Special Olympics)
- Asian Games Torch, a torch relay associated with the Asian Games
- Pan American Torch, a torch relay associated with the Pan American Games
- King's Baton Relay, an analogous relay associated with the Commonwealth Games
- Universiade Torch, a torch relay associated with the Universiade
