= 2000 Summer Olympics cauldron =

Olympics cauldron for the 2000 Sydney Olympics

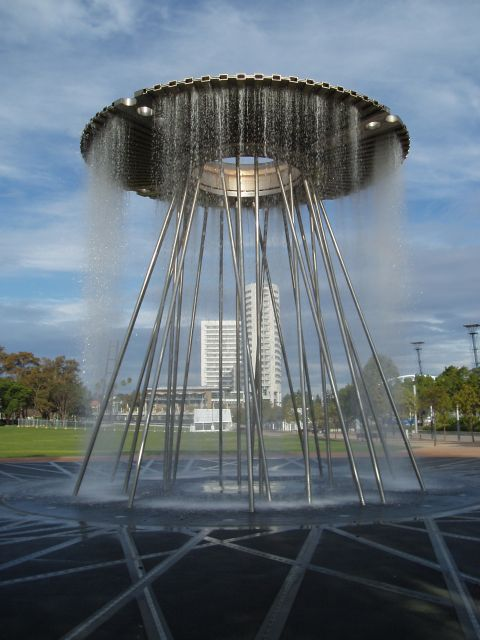
- Interactive map of 2000 Summer Olympics cauldron
- Location: Cathy Freeman Park near corner of Olympic Boulevard and the Grand Parade, Sydney Olympic Park, City of Parramatta Council, New South Wales, Australia

History
- Built: 2000–2010

Site notes
- Architect(s): Michael Scott-Mitchell (original design) and Tzannes Associates (re-presented in Cathy Freeman Park)
- Owner: Sydney Olympic Park Authority

New South Wales Heritage Register
- Official name: Olympic Cauldron at Sydney Olympic Park; The Cauldron; Sydney Olympic Games Cauldron; Millenium Games Cauldron; Sydney 2000 Games Cauldron
- Type: state heritage (built)
- Designated: 10 September 2010
- Reference no.: 1839
- Type: Olympic Facility
- Category: Recreation and Entertainment
- Builders: Engineers Tierney and Partners with the assistance of LUSAS Civil and Structural

The 2000 Summer Olympics cauldron is a heritage-listed former Olympic flame holder and now fountain at Cathy Freeman Park, within the Sydney Olympic Park in Parramatta Council, New South Wales. It was designed by Michael Scott-Mitchell for the 2000 Summer Olympics and Paralympics and was initially installed at Stadium Australia. After the games it was moved to its current location with adaptations by Tzannes Associates. It was added to the New South Wales State Heritage Register on 10 September 2010.

The 8.5 tonne cauldron is a perforated, corrugated shell structure fabricated from stainless steel. It has an overall diameter of 10m and tapers from 0.85m thick at centre down to 0.15m thick at the edge. The cauldron was designed to rise out of a circular pond after the flame was lit, and ascend, as though floating, up a waterfall to the top of the northern stand. It was collected by a 50-metre mast rising from behind the stand, and the main burner in the tip of the mast was lit.

== Design ==
The idea of a cauldron lighting ceremony that combined fire and water was conceived by Ric Birch, Director of Ceremonies for the Sydney games. The structural design of cauldron, mast and transport components was largely undertaken by Tierney and Partners with the assistance of LUSAS Civil and Structural. Its construction involved two years of planning, design and rigorous implementation by a team of design engineers, manufacturers and suppliers covering structural, mechanical, electrical and hydraulic engineering, gas-burner technology and computer control.

Designer Michael Scott-Mitchell described the commission as "the fabulous brief of working out how to combine fire and water in the presentation of the Olympic Cauldron," recalling his initial meeting with Birch in January 1997:

"I was genuinely excited about the combination of these two natural elements: Fire and Water. Each has its own very particular attributes, which in an unexpected way complement one another perfectly. They are perhaps the two elements that resonate most profoundly with the Australian landscape. Both have cleansing and restorative qualities that cyclically regenerate our land. It is their ability to cleanse and regenerate that symbolically most excited me.... [The] lighting of the Cauldron for the Sydney 2000 Olympics is the first in a new Millennium, and I was keen to express the notion of the regeneration of the Olympic Spirit in the design."

== Use during the Games ==
=== Olympic Games ===
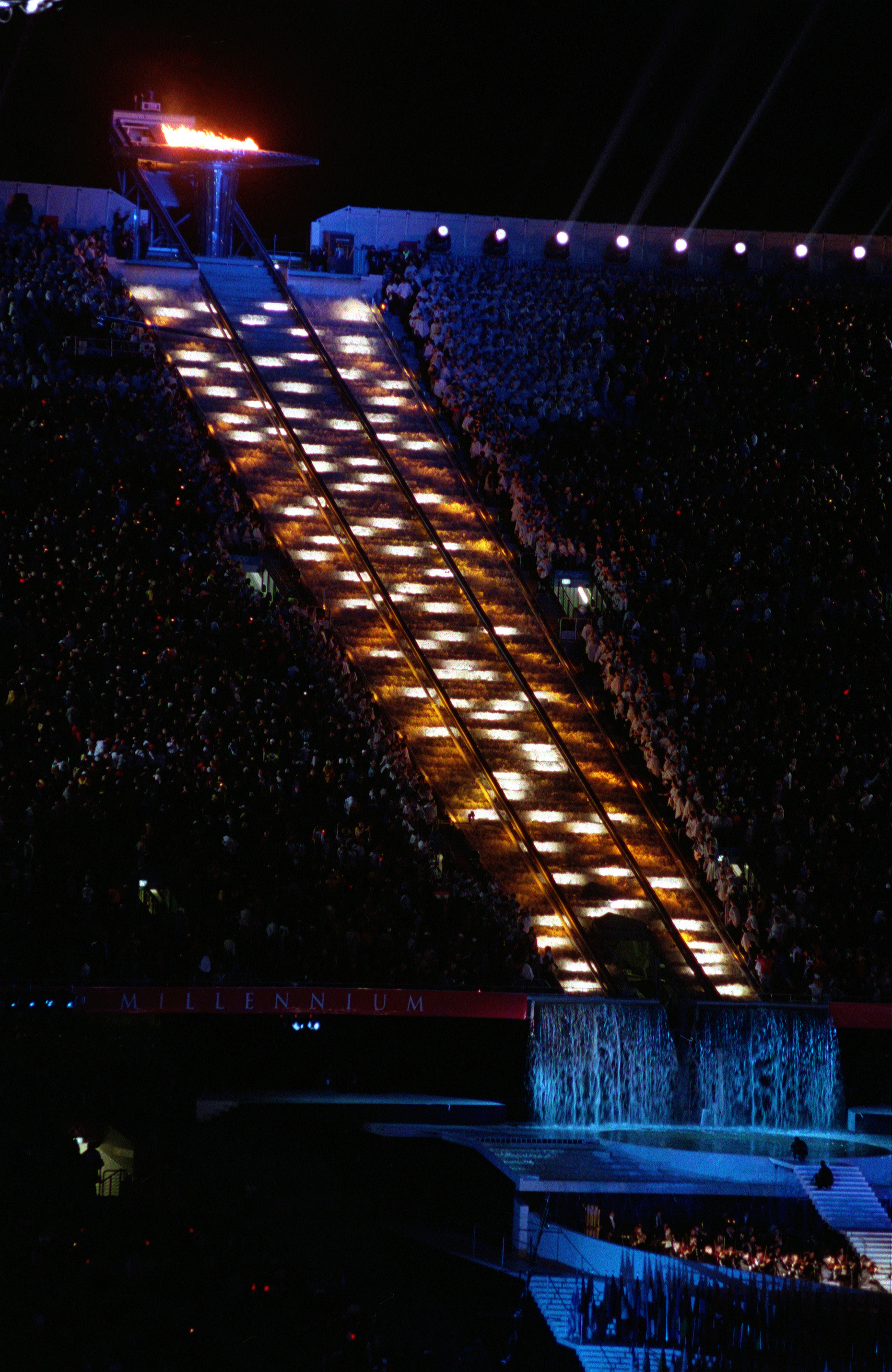
The Olympic Cauldron reaching its place at the top of the grandstand

The 2000 Summer Olympics torch relay which began with a young indigenous Australian woman, Nova Peris ended with another in Cathy Freeman. Freeman ascended four flights of stairs carrying the torch before walking across a shallow circular pond to an island in the centre, where she dipped the torch low and swept it around her to ignite a ring of fire. Scott-Mitchell had designed the sequence with Freeman in mind four years earlier but was only informed that she would indeed light the cauldron in the early hours of the day of the Opening Ceremony. As the flaming cauldron rose around Freeman, an emergency sensor stalled the cauldron for about three minutes at the base of the conveyor designed to move it to the roof of the stadium. The cauldron was successfully restarted by engineers Teter Tait and Rob Ironside and reached its destination.

The television footage of Freeman lighting the cauldron was declared "the sporting image of the year" by Sportel, a major international sports television convention held annually in Monaco, which awarded its coveted "Golden Podium" award to the Sydney Olympic Broadcasting Organisation for the cauldron lighting sequence.

=== Paralympic Games ===
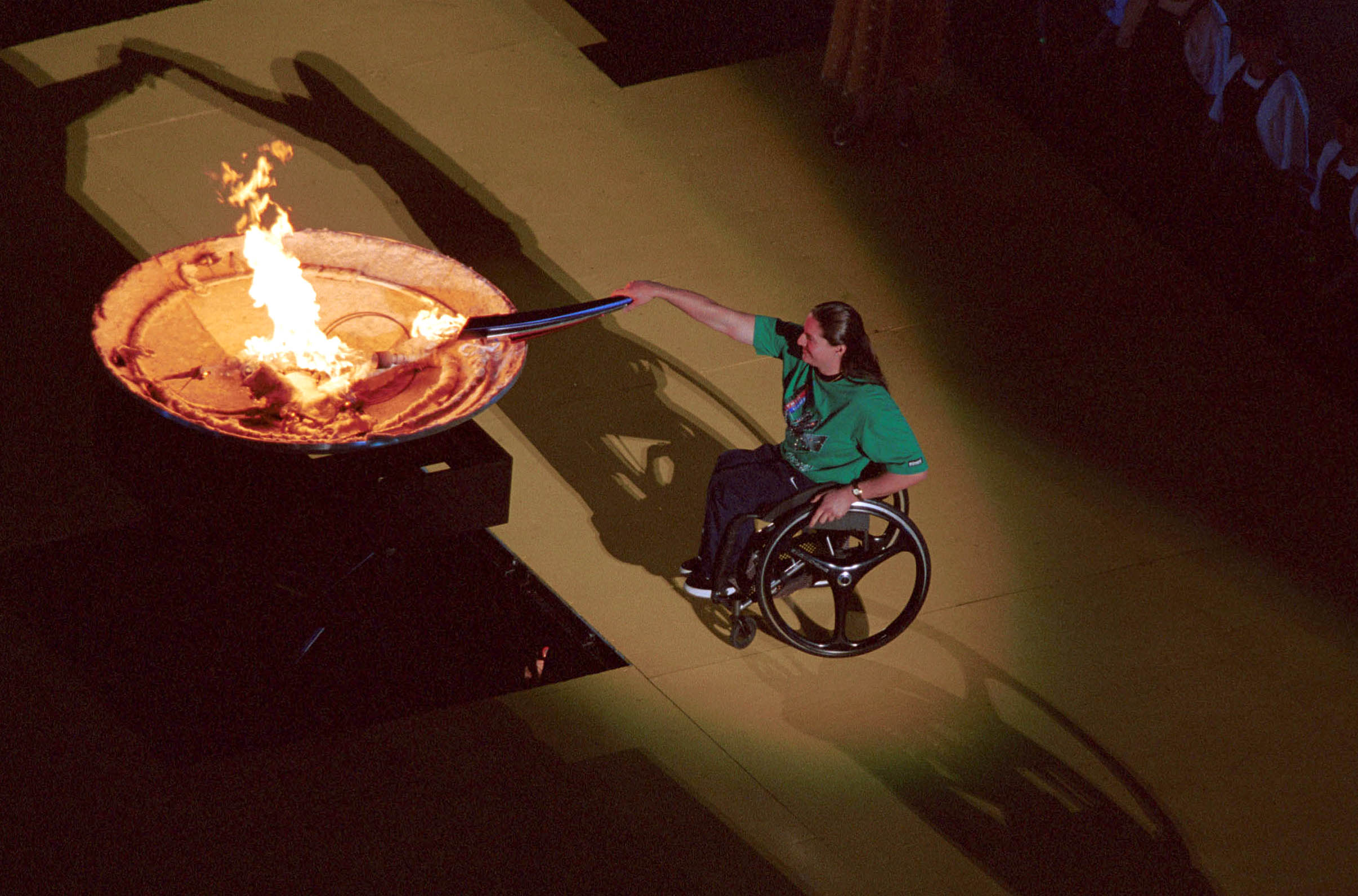
Sauvage lighting the miniature cauldron during the Opening Ceremonies

The cauldron was lit by wheelchair racer Louise Sauvage at the opening ceremony for the Sydney Paralympic Games on 18 October 2000. A miniature cauldron rose from beneath the centre stage. After being lit, it threw a flame in the direction of the cauldron at the top of the grandstand where it had burned during the Olympics. A relay of fireworks carried the flame along the length of the field to ignite the cauldron.

== After the Games ==
In 2001 the end stand on the northern part of the stadium was removed and Tzannes Associates commissioned to reinterpret the cauldron, in a nearby location now known as Cathy Freeman Park. There the stem was removed and the cauldron was repositioned on top of a group of 24 stainless steel poles organized in a haphazard arrangement, approximately 10 metres above the ground.

The retrofitted cauldron includes a new burner system, and a water feature inside the perforated cladding. Both are fed via an underground plant room directly below that also houses the light fittings in the cauldron and infrastructure for the water feature. The cauldron operates intermittently as a fountain with water flowing over the sides of the cauldron onto the pavement below. It can still be lit with a flame for ceremonial occasions.

The cauldron is surrounded by the Roll of Honour, a decorative elliptical pavement inlaid with the names of all medalists at the Sydney Olympic and Paralympic Games.
