= 2014 Winter Olympics cauldron =

Structure in Sochi, Russia

2014 Winter Olympics and Paralympics Cauldron
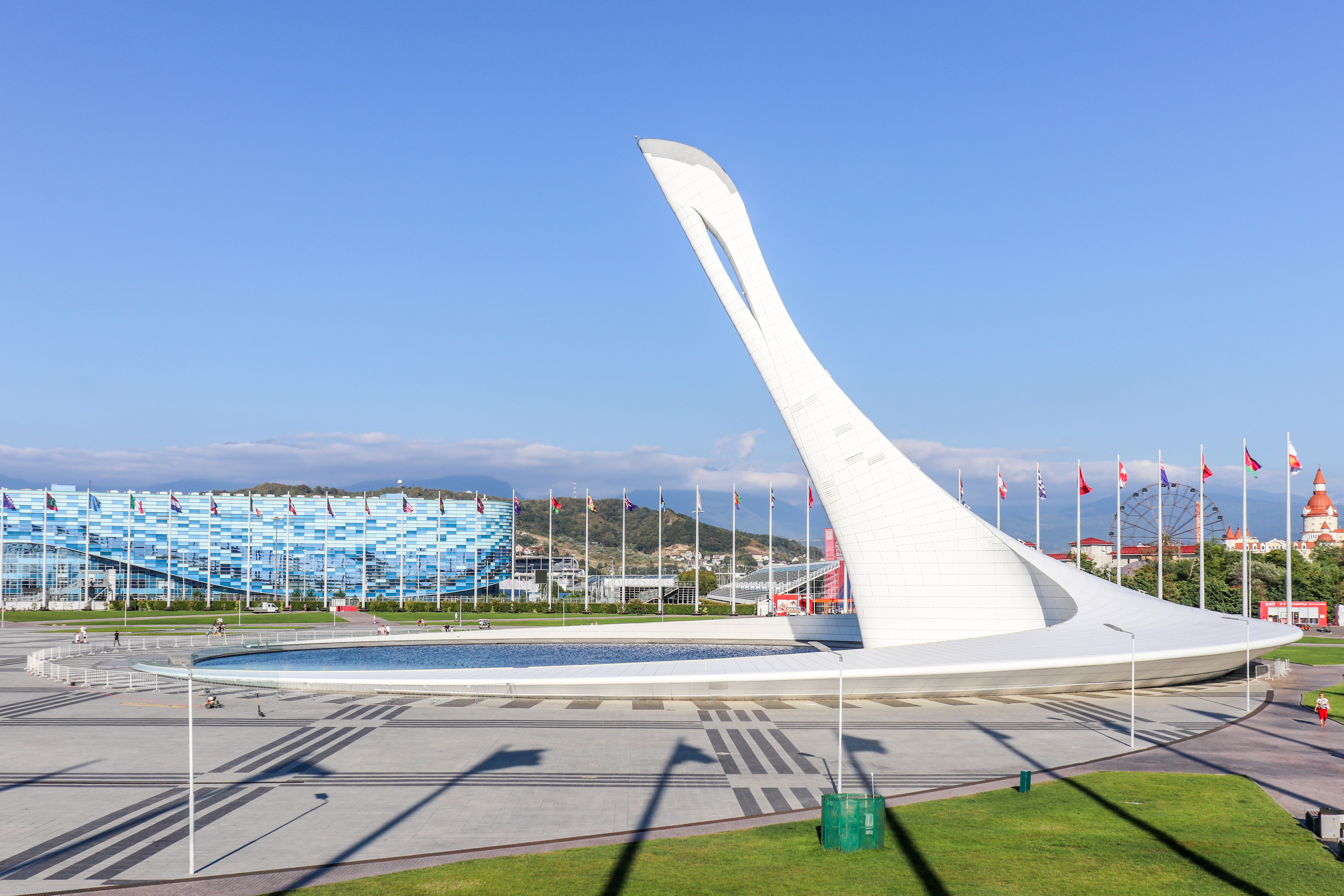
- 2014 Winter Olympics and Paralympics Cauldron
- Year: 2014
- Location: Sochi, Russia; 43°24′20″N 39°57′17″E

The 2014 Winter Olympics and Paralympics cauldron was erected for the 2014 Winter Olympics and 2014 Winter Paralympics in Sochi, Russia.

After the games, the cauldron became a singing fountain, performing light-up renditions of songs like Queen's "The Show Must Go On" or a medley of Michael Jackson's songs on summer evenings.
