= Transport in Greater Tokyo =

Overview of the transportation network in Greater Tokyo

- Map of Tokyo Metro and Toei Subway rail lines in Tokyo

Overview
- Owner: Tokyo Metropolitan Government, Tokyo Metropolitan Bureau of Transportation, Kanagawa Prefecture, Saitama Prefecture, Chiba Prefecture, other municipal governments
- Locale: Greater Tokyo Metropolitan Area
- Transit type: Rapid transit, commuter rail, bus and bus rapid transit, light rail, people mover, aerial tramway, bicycle sharing system, taxicab

Operation
- Operators: Tokyo Metro, Toei Subway, Keikyu Corporation, Keio Corporation, Odakyu Electric Railway, Keisei Electric Railway, JR East, Seibu Railway, Tobu Railway, Tokyu Group, Metropolitan Intercity Railway Company, Tokyo Waterfront Area Rapid Transit, Yurikamome, Tokyo Monorail, Sagami Railway

Technical
- Track gauge: 1,067 mm (most common)

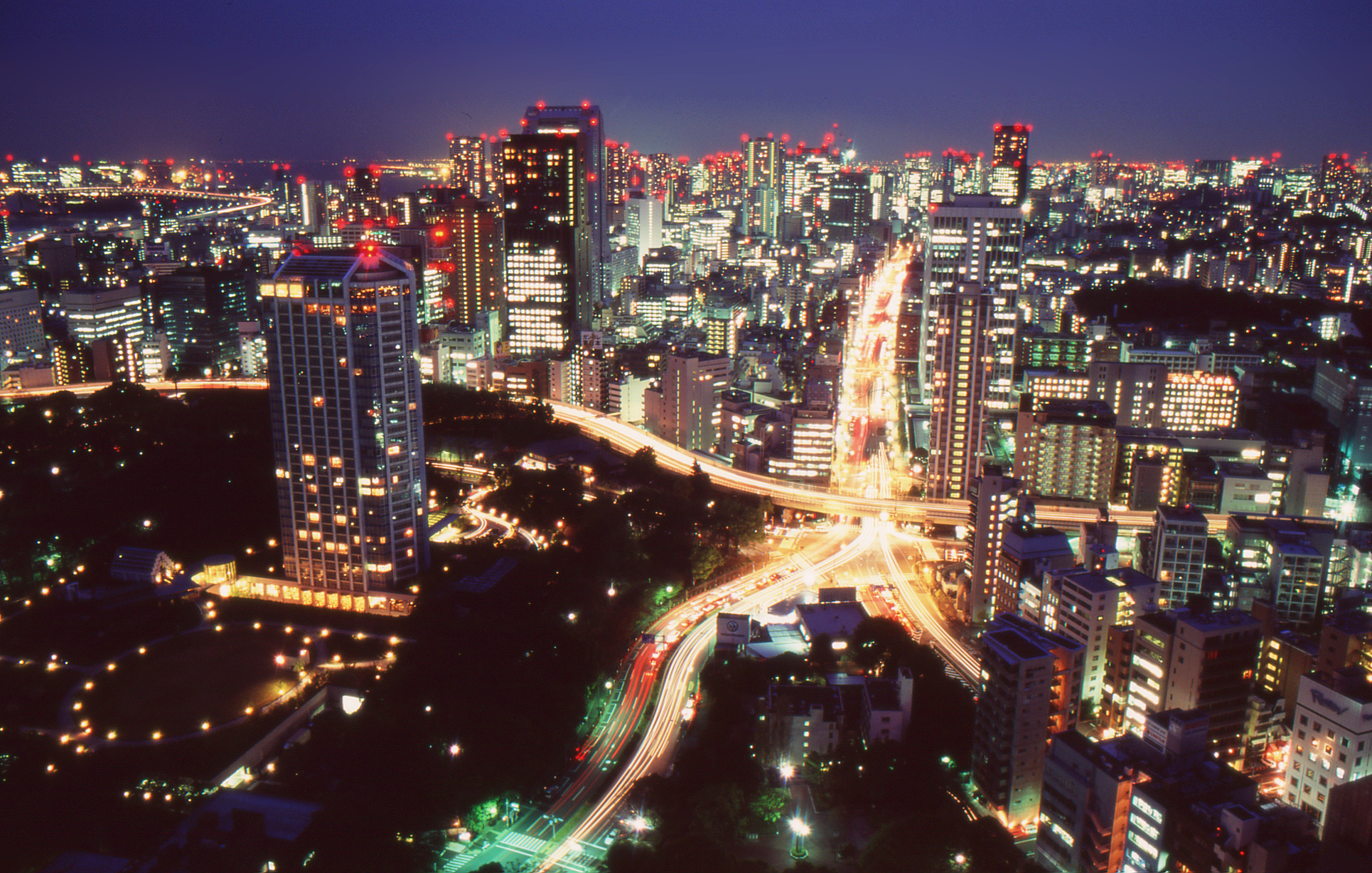
Tokyo streets at night

The transport network in Greater Tokyo includes public and private rail and highway networks; airports for international, domestic, and general aviation; buses; motorcycle delivery services, walking, bicycling, and commercial shipping. While the nexus is in the central part of Tokyo, every part of the Greater Tokyo Area has rail or road transport services. There are also a number of ports offering sea and air transport to the general public.

Public transport within Greater Tokyo is dominated by the world's most extensive urban rail network (as of May 2014, the article Tokyo rail list lists 158 lines, 48 operators, 4,714.5 km of operational track and 2,210 stations) (although stations are recounted for each operator) of suburban trains and subways run by a variety of operators, with buses, trams, monorails, and other modes supporting the railway lines. The above figures do not include any Shinkansen services. However, because each operator manages only its own network, the system is managed as a collection of rail networks rather than a single unit. Forty million passengers (counted twice if transferring between operators) use the rail system daily (14.6 billion annually) with the subway representing 22% of that figure with 8.66 million using it daily. There are 0.24 commuter rail stations per square kilometer (0.61/sq mi) in the Tokyo area, or one for each 4.1 square kilometers (1.6 sq mi) of developed land area. Commuter rail ridership is very dense, at six million people per line mile annually, with the highest among automotive urban areas. Walking and cycling are much more common than in many cities around the globe. Private automobiles and motorcycles play a secondary role in urban transport.

== Rail ==
=== Overview ===
==== Statistical profile ====
Rail is the primary mode of transport in Tokyo. Greater Tokyo has the most extensive urban railway network and the most used in the world with 40 million passengers (transfers between networks tallied twice) in the metro area daily, out of a metro population of 36 million. There are 882 interconnected rail stations in the Tokyo Metropolis, 282 of which are Subway stations, with several hundred more in each of the three surrounding densely populated suburban prefectures. There are 30 operators running 121 passenger rail lines (102 serving Tokyo and 19 more serving Greater Tokyo but not Tokyo's city center itself), excluding about 12 cable cars.

==== Features ====
Uniquely to most major cities in the world, Tokyo's railway system is not a single, unified and centrally operated network, but rather, it consists of many separately owned and operated systems with varying degrees of interconnectivity. Most lines in Tokyo are privately owned, funded, and operated, though some, like the Toei Subway and the Tokyo Metro, are supported by the Government either directly or indirectly. Each of the region's rail companies tends to display only its own maps, with key transfer points highlighted, ignoring the rest of the metro area's network.

Extensive through and express services for seamless interconnections between certain lines are a major feature of the network; the Narita-Haneda service run integrates track of six separate and independent operators. Suburban rail operations and subway lines are also very integrated. Frequent and high-capacity suburban trains from the suburbs commonly continue directly into the subway network to serve central Tokyo, often emerging on the other side of the city to serve another company's surface suburban lines, behaving like an S-bahn network. Shinjuku Station is the busiest train station in the world by passenger throughput. Tokyo's railways tend to shut down at around midnight, with stations themselves closing around 1 a.m.

Trains had historically been extremely crowded at peak travel times, with people being pushed into trains by so-called oshiya ("pushers"), which was common in the boom eras of the 1960s–1980s. Upgrades on Greater Tokyo's railways are chiefly focused on improving services and grade-separating lines.

==== Corporate networks ====
Since corporations own, fund, promote, and operate their own networks, this tends to result in high fragmentation and company stations. The end user may need to pass through multiple company gates to get to their destination, racking up extra costs in the process (generally the longer the trip, the less charged per kilometer). This is in contrast to other nations where fares are calculated in a more integrated way. For tourists, transferring between multiple operators and paying several times to get to a single destination within the metro area can be quite confusing and expensive. Locals tend to patronize a particular company for a particular destination and walk/bike to and from that company's stations, avoiding the need to transfer and pay another fare to a different company that may have a station closer to the desired destination. Some private railroads also capitalize on real estate holdings and high foot traffic by operating their own retail stores at stations. For example, Odakyu Electric Railway and Keio Corporation both have department stores over their properties at Shinjuku Station.

=== Busiest JR stations ===
Passengers carried in Greater Tokyo stations daily (2023):

1. Shinjuku Station 650,602
2. Ikebukuro Station 489,933
3. Tokyo Station 403,831
4. Yokohama Station 362,348
5. Shibuya Station 314,059
6. Shinagawa Station 274,221
7. Ōmiya Station 244,393
8. Shimbashi Station 219,113
9. Akihabara Station 211,998
10. Kita-Senju Station 193,748

=== Japan Railway ===
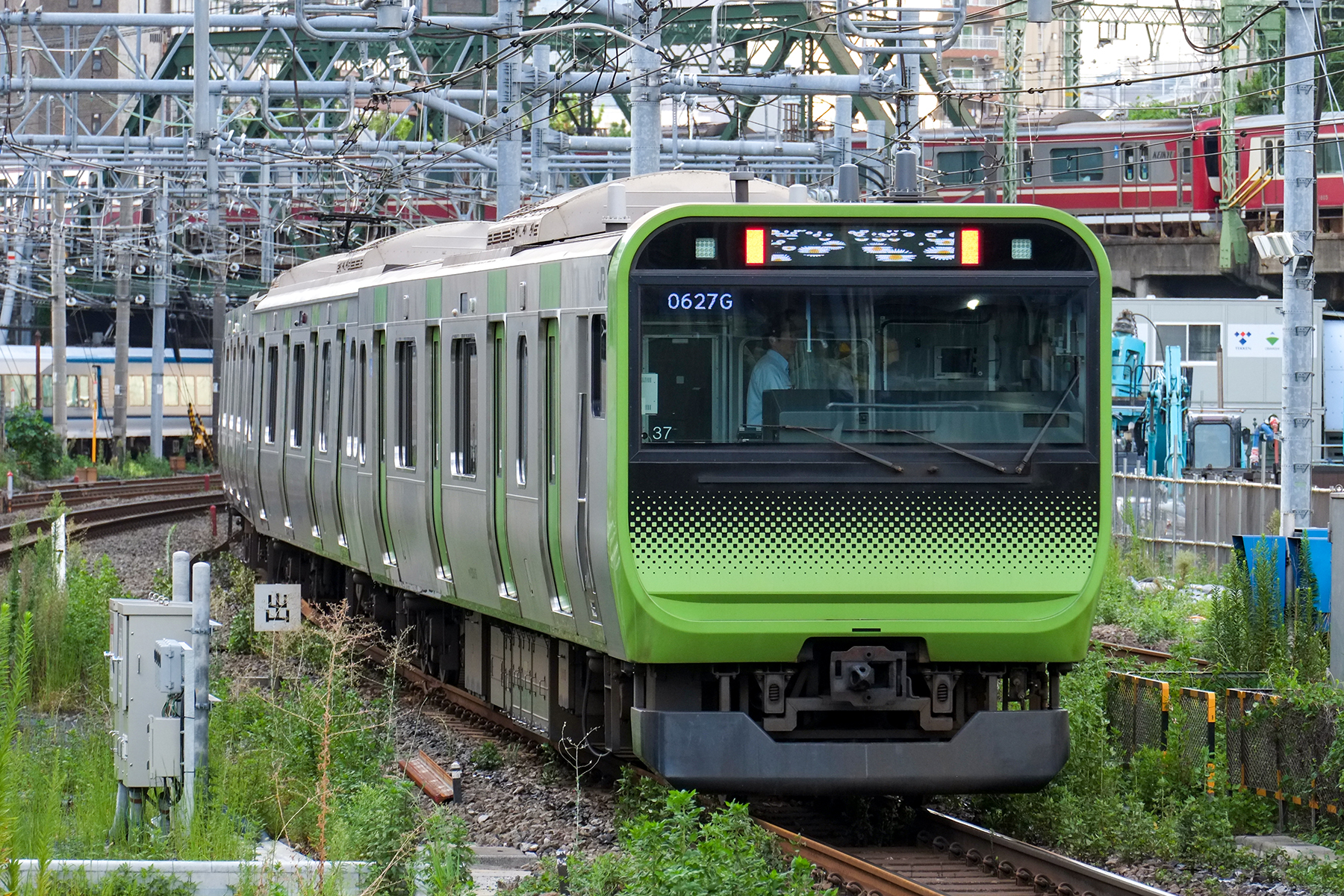
JR Yamanote Line

East Japan Railway Company, or JR East, is the largest passenger railway company in the world. It operates trains throughout the Greater Tokyo area (as well as the rest of northeastern Honshū).

In addition to operating some long-haul shinkansen ("bullet train") lines, JR East operates Tokyo's largest commuter railway network. This network includes the Yamanote Line , which encircles the center of Tokyo; the Keihin-Tohoku Line between Saitama and Yokohama; the Utsunomiya Line (part of the Tōhoku Main Line) to Saitama and beyond; the Chuo Line to western Tokyo; the Sobu Line , Chuo-Sobu Line and Keiyō Line to Chiba; and the Yokohama , Tokaido , and Yokosuka lines to Kanagawa.

Many additional lines form a network outside the center of the city, allowing inter-suburban travel. Among these are the Hachikō, Itsukaichi, Joban , Jōetsu, Kawagoe, Musashino , Ōme, Negishi, Nambu , Sagami, Takasaki , and Tsurumi lines. In total, JR alone operates 23 lines within the Greater Tokyo area.

JR East is also the majority shareholder in the Tokyo Monorail , one of the world's most commercially successful monorail lines.

=== Other railway operators serving Greater Tokyo ===
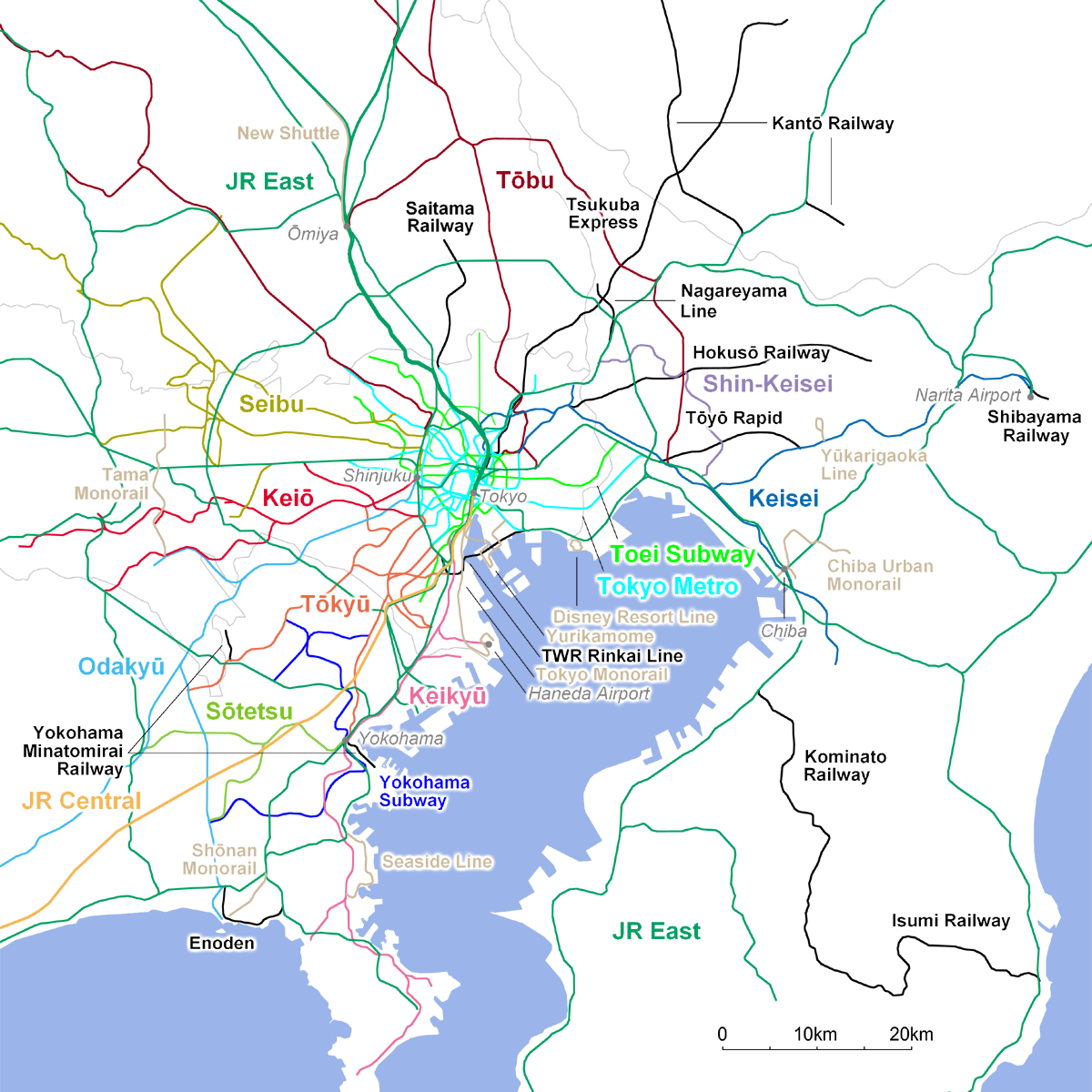
Map of operators in Greater Tokyo Area

Regional railways transport commuters from the suburbs to central Tokyo. These include several private railway networks that own and operate a total of 55 lines serving Tokyo. These same operators indirectly operate another 24 lines outside of Tokyo as well as a few tourist-oriented aerial lifts and funiculars.

- Keihin Electric Express Railway (Keikyu): Operates out of Shinagawa Station to Kanagawa and Haneda Airport. Five lines.
- Keio Corporation: Operates out of Shinjuku Station and Shibuya Station to western Tokyo. Six lines.
- Keisei Electric Railway: Operates out of Keisei Ueno Station to Chiba (including Narita International Airport). Seven lines.
- Odakyu Electric Railway: Operates out of Shinjuku Station to Kanagawa, most notably Odawara, Enoshima, and Hakone. Three lines.
- Seibu Railway: Operates out of Seibu Shinjuku Station and Ikebukuro Station to western Tokyo. Thirteen lines.
- Tobu Railway: Operates out of Ikebukuro Station and Asakusa Station to Saitama, Gunma, and Tochigi. Twelve lines.
- Tokyu Corporation (Tokyu): Operates out of Shibuya Station and Meguro Station to southern Tokyo and Yokohama. Eight lines.
- Sagami Railway (Sotetsu): Operates out of Yokohama Station to eastern Kanagawa and operates through services to Tokyo and Saitama via the Eastern Kanagawa Rail Link to the JR and Tokyu networks. Three lines.
- Metropolitan Intercity Railway Company (Tsukuba Express or TX): Links Akihabara Station with Tsukuba. One line.

Some private and public carriers operate within the boundaries of Tokyo.

- Tokyo Waterfront Area Rapid Transit: Operates the Rinkai Line along the Tokyo waterfront to Odaiba.
- Tokyo Monorail : Connects central Tokyo to Haneda Airport.
- Yurikamome : People mover serving the Tokyo waterfront and Odaiba.
- Tama Toshi Monorail: A suburban transit line running north–south through Western Tokyo.

=== Subway operators ===
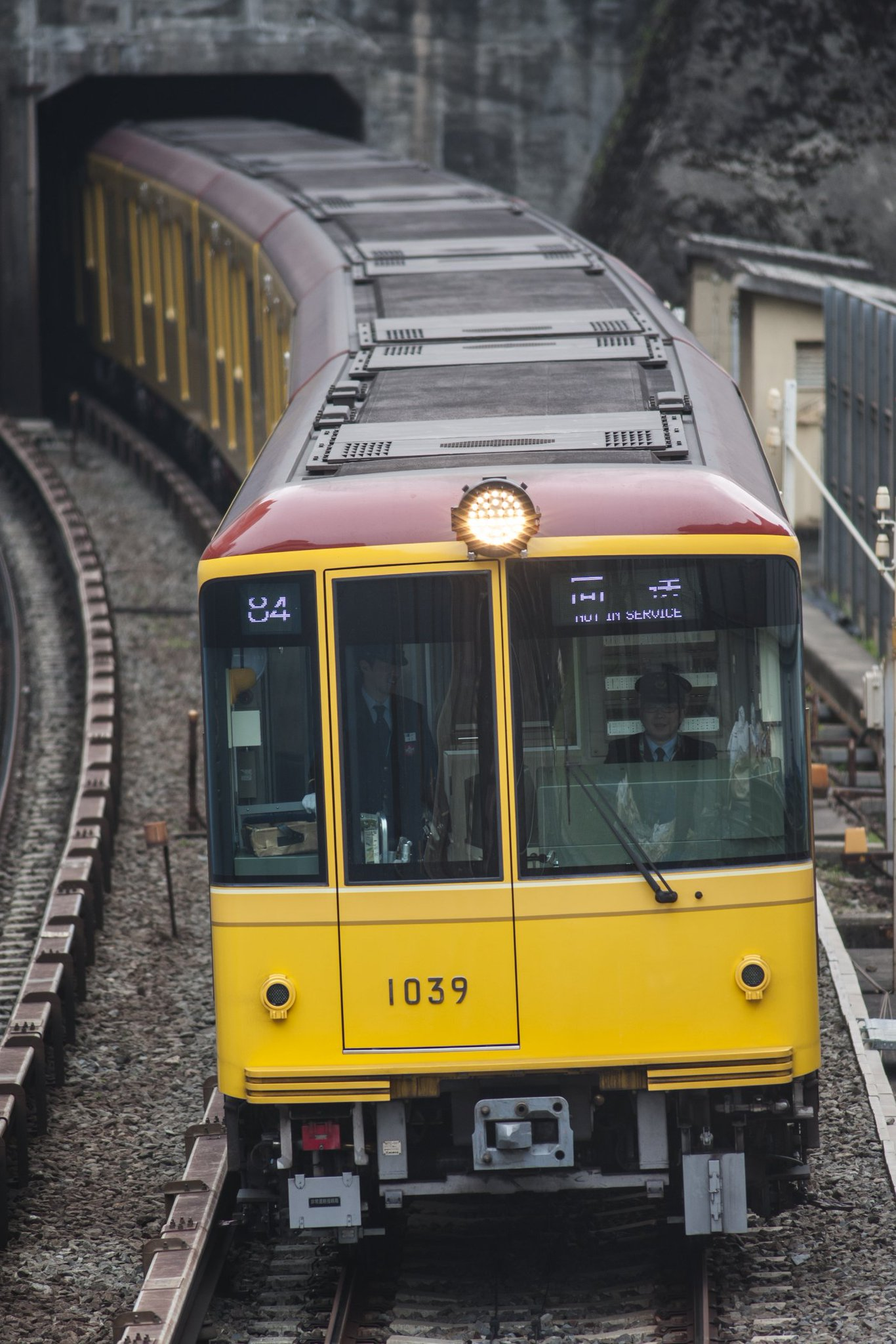
The Ginza Line, Asia's oldest subway line, first opened in 1927

Two organizations operate the Tokyo subway network with several other operators in the metropolitan area that operate lines that can be classified as rapid transit:

- Tokyo Metro (formerly Eidan): Operates Tokyo's (and Japan's) largest subway network, with nine lines.
- Tokyo Metropolitan Bureau of Transportation: Operates the four Toei Subway lines as well as the following:
  - Toden Arakawa Line: Once a common sight before subways and buses came to fore, the streetcar network has shrunk to only this one route between Waseda Station and Minowabashi Station.
  - Nippori-Toneri Liner: People mover in northeast Tokyo owned and operated by the Tokyo Metropolitan Bureau of Transportation.
  - Ueno Zoo Monorail: Short monorail in Ueno Zoo.
- Yokohama Municipal Subway: Owned and operated by the Yokohama City Transportation Bureau with two lines.
- Toyo Rapid Railway : A mostly underground line that acts as an extension of the Tokyo Metro Tōzai Line connecting Funabashi and Yachiyo, Chiba.
- Saitama Rapid Railway : An underground line that acts as an extension of the Tokyo Metro Namboku Line connecting southern Saitama to Tokyo.
- Rinkai Line: A mostly underground line that serves Tokyo's waterfront.

=== Other railway operators of Greater Tokyo ===
Railway companies that serve other parts of Greater Tokyo include:

- Chiba Prefecture
  - Hokuso Railway : Northeast Chiba Prefecture.
  - Shibayama Railway : A short railway line in northern Chiba, operations are subcontracted to Keisei Electric Railway.
  - Chiba Urban Monorail: Serving the city of Chiba.
  - Disney Resort Line: A monorail that links Maihama Station and Tokyo Disney Resort.
  - Ryutetsu: A short line railway in Nagareyama, Chiba.
  - Yamaman Yukarigaoka Line: A people mover in Sakura, Chiba.
- Kanagawa Prefecture
  - Enoshima Electric Railway (Enoden): Scenic rail line running between Kamakura and Fujisawa in southern Kanagawa.
  - Shonan Monorail: A monorail connecting Ofuna Station to the Shonan coast.
  - Kanazawa Seaside Line: People mover in southern Yokohama.
  - Yokohama Minatomirai Railway (Minatomirai Line and Kodomo-no-Kuni Line): Owns two lines in Yokohama; operations are subcontracted to Tokyu Corporation.
- Saitama Prefecture
  - Saitama New Urban Transit (New Shuttle): A people mover in central Saitama.

=== Ridership ===
Below is the annual ridership of each major operator as of the 2017 fiscal year. Transfers between operators are not counted unless they pass through a ticketing gate (not simply a platform).

Operator	Daily ridership	Annual ridership
East Japan Railway Company	16,359,962	5,971,386,130
Tokyo Metro	7,422,095	2,709,064,675
Tōkyū Corporation	3,171,660	1,157,655,900
Toei Subway	3,128,718	1,141,982,070
Tōbu Railway	2,522,067	920,554,455
Odakyū Electric Railway	2,069,383	755,324,795
Keio Corporation	1,851,364	675,747,860
Seibu Railway	1,804,521	658,650,165
Keihin Electric Railway (Keikyu)	1,316,499	480,522,135
Keisei Electric Railway	786,063	286,912,995
Sagami Railway	634,899	231,738,135
Total	41,067,231	14,989,539,315

== Buses and trams ==
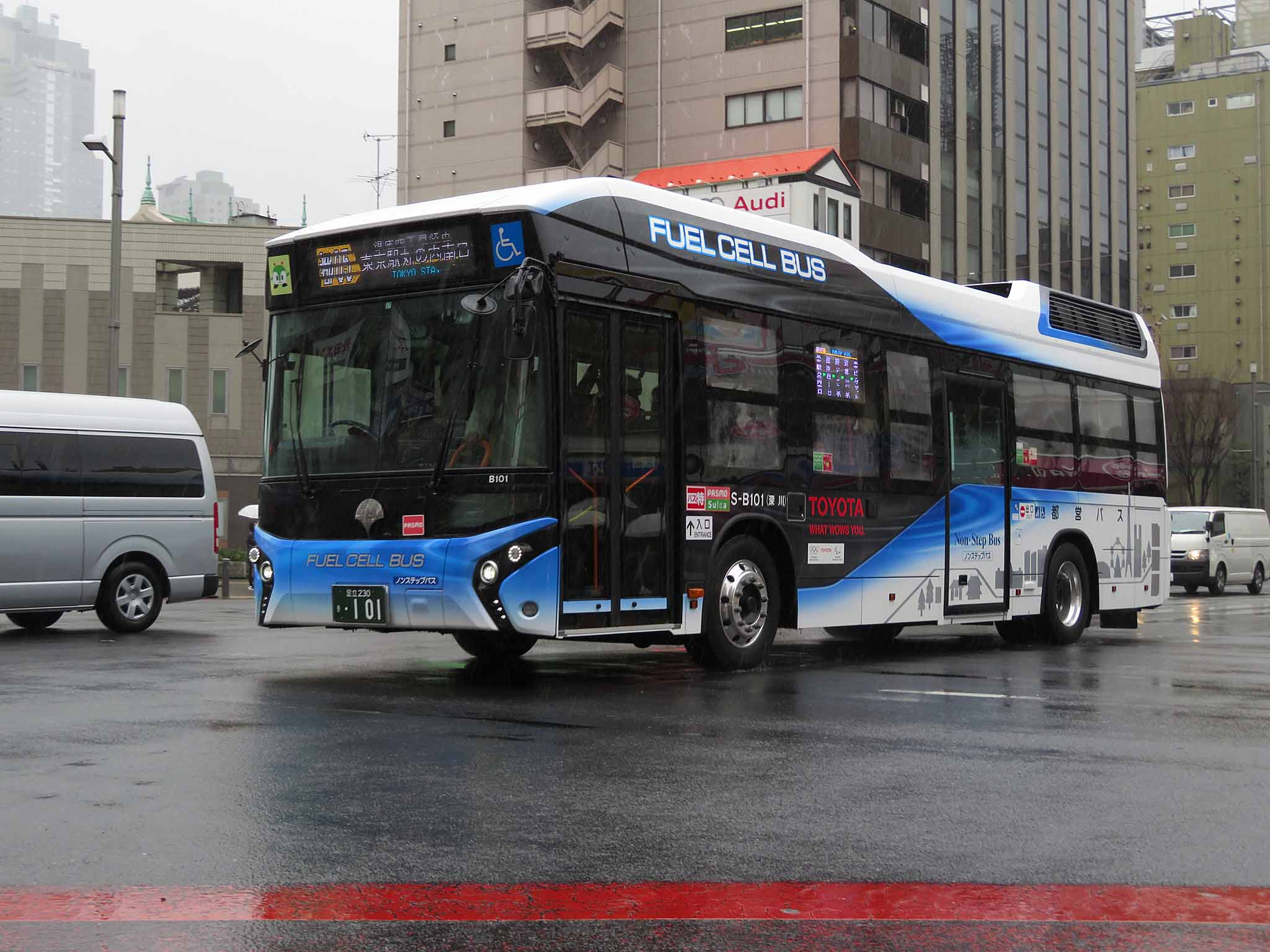
Toei bus

Public buses in Greater Tokyo usually serve a secondary role, feeding bus passengers to and from train stations. Exceptions are long-distance bus services, buses in areas poorly served by rail (not many exist), and airport bus services for people with luggage. Tokyo Metropolitan Bureau of Transportation operates Toei buses mainly within the 23 special wards while private bus companies (mostly the subsidiaries of the large train operators listed above) operate other bus routes, as do other city governments, such as Kawasaki City Bus, Yokohama City Bus, etc. Toei buses have a fixed fare of 210 yen per ride, while most other companies charge according to distance. Some train operators offer combined bus/train tickets; special fares apply for children, seniors and the disabled. Some routes feature non-step buses with a kneeling function to assist mobility-impaired users.

Tokyo Toden, Tokyo's tram network, previously boasted 41 routes with 213 kilometers of track. Now Tokyo has one tram line and one light rail line.

== Taxis ==
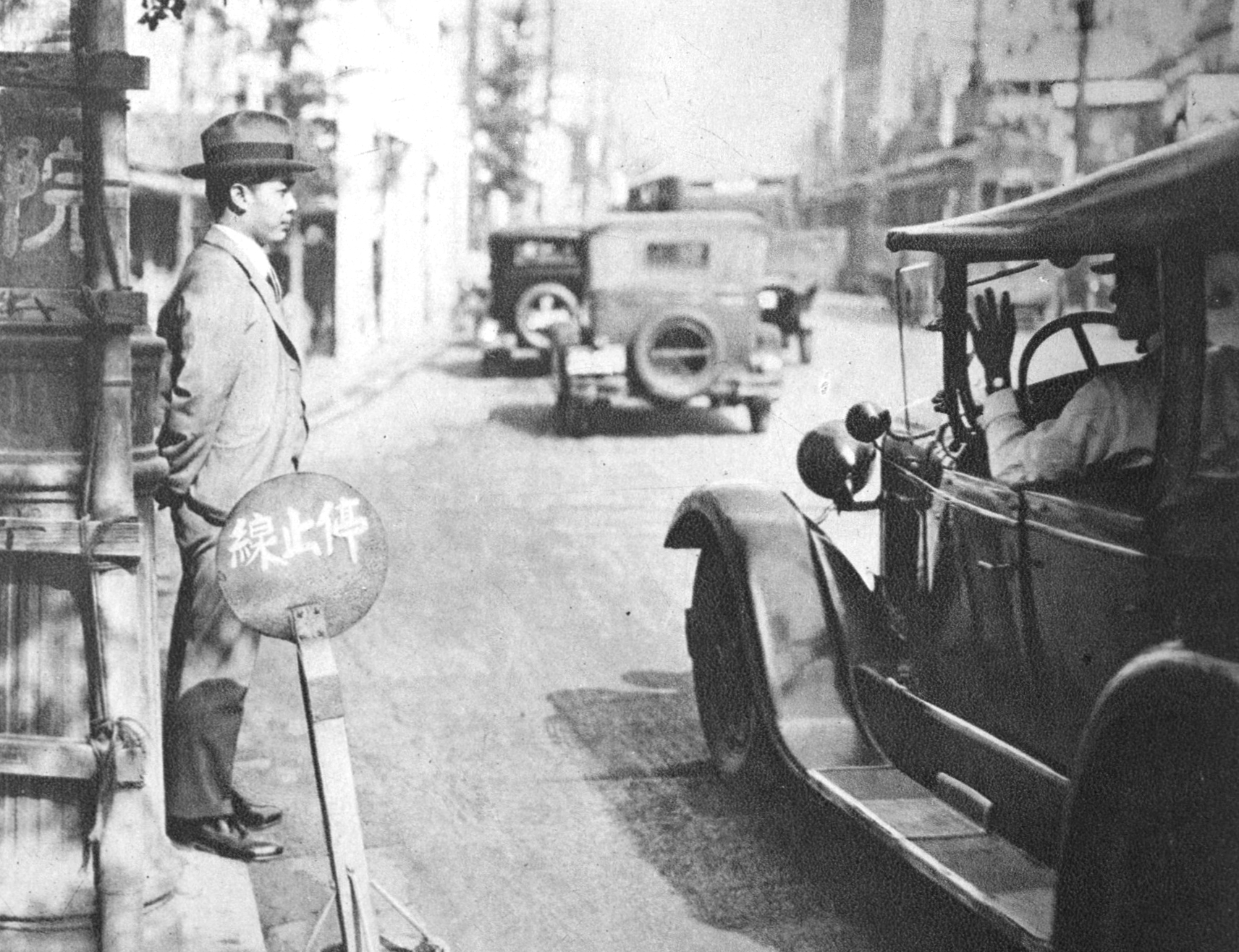
A Tokyo taxi driver indicating a fare of 50 Sen by holding up five fingers, in 1932

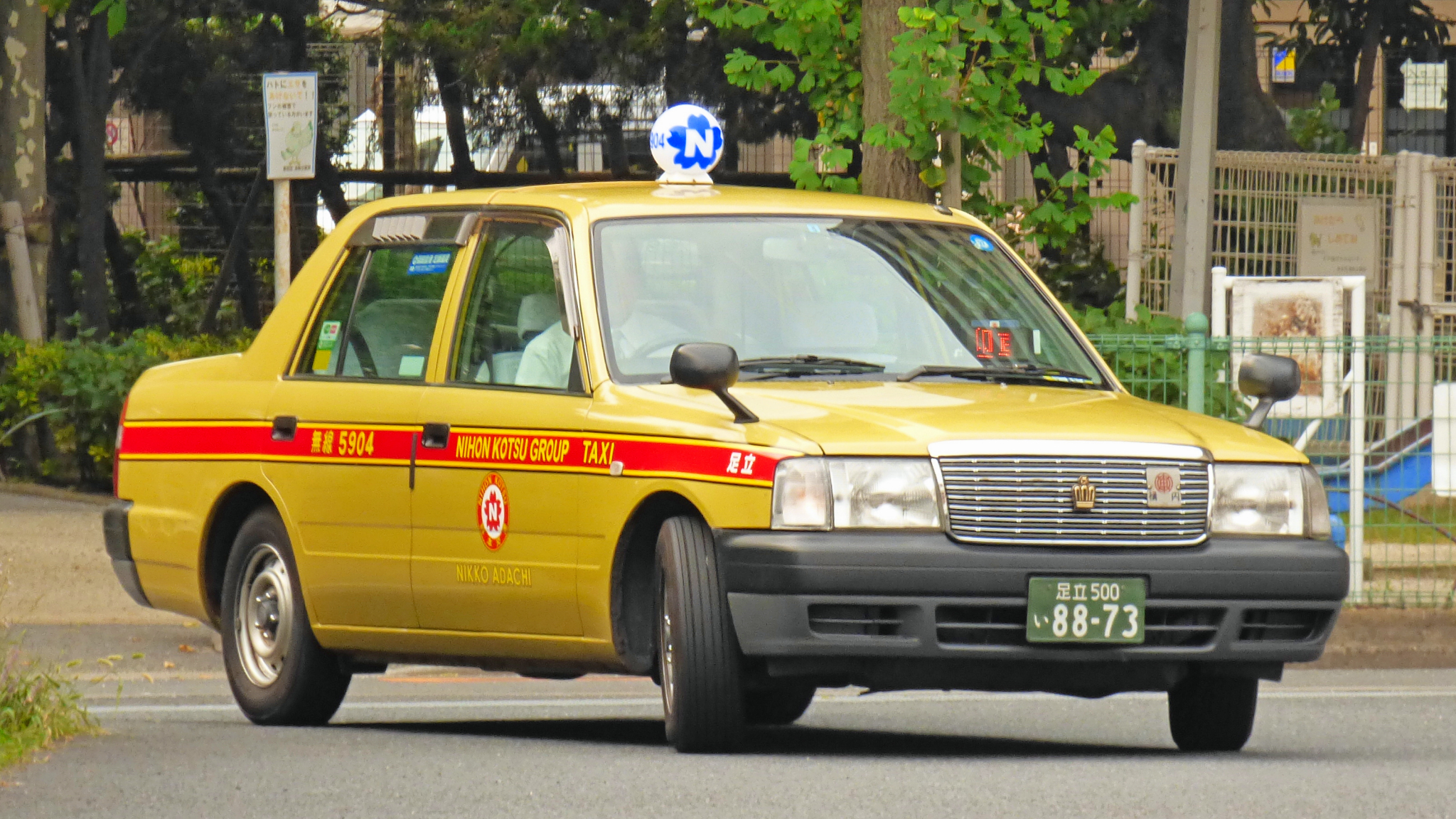
Toyota Crown Comfort Nihon Kotsu Taxi

Taxis also serve a similar role to buses, supplementing the rail system, especially after midnight when most rail lines cease to operate. People moving around the city on business often choose taxis for convenience, as do people setting out in small groups.

As of December 2007, taxis cost ¥710 (~US$7.89 at ¥90/US$1) for the first two kilometers, and ¥90 for every 288 meters thereafter, or approximately ¥312.5 per kilometer. Most companies tend to raise fares by 20% between 22:00-5:00, but other companies have kept fares low to compete in a crowded market.

== Roads ==
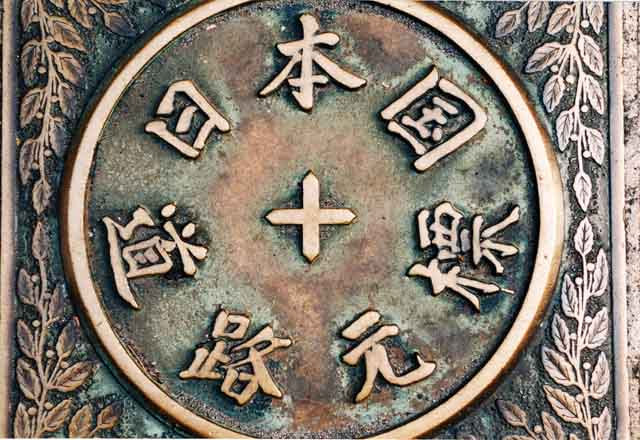
This marker in Nihonbashi is the place from which distances along highways are reckoned.

=== Local and regional highways ===
National, prefectural and metropolitan, and local roads crisscross the region. Some of the major national highways are:

- Route 1 links Tokyo to Osaka along the old Tōkaidō
- Route 6 and Route 4 carries traffic north all the way to Sendai and Aomori respectively.
- Route 14 connects Nihonbashi with Chiba Prefecture.
- Route 16 is a heavily travelled circumferential linking Yokosuka, Yokohama, western Tokyo, Saitama, and Chiba.
- Route 17 originates in central Tokyo and passes through Saitama en route to Niigata Prefecture.
- Route 20 crosses Tokyo from east to west, continuing into Yamanashi Prefecture.

The datum from which distances are reckoned is in Nihonbashi.

=== Expressways ===
The Shuto Expressway network covers central Tokyo, linking the intercity expressways together, while primarily serving commuters and truck traffic. The Bayshore Route bypasses Tokyo by traveling from Kanagawa Prefecture in between, above, and under manmade islands around Tokyo Bay to Chiba Prefecture. The Tokyo Bay Aqua-Line, which goes underneath Tokyo Bay, links Kawasaki to Kisarazu in Chiba Prefecture. Important regional expressways include the Tokyo Inner Circular Expressway, Tokyo Outer Circular Expressway, Third Tokyo-Yokohama Road, and Tokyo-Chiba Road. Presently under construction (with some segments operating), the Central Capital District Expressway will be a major circumferential through the area.

Many long-distance expressway routes converge at Tokyo including the Tōmei Expressway, Chūō Expressway, Kan-Etsu Expressway, and Tōhoku Expressway.

=== Private/Commercial autos ===
Private and commercial automobiles account are owned by fewer individuals than in other parts of the country. Tokyo, with a population of over 13 million, in 2014 registered a bit less than 4 million vehicles. Tokyo's average car size is larger than the rest of the country, with only 20.1% being kei cars. However it has followed the national trend of kei car popularity increasing almost every year. Kanagawa prefecture also followed a similar trend but to a lower degree, the other two suburban prefectures were similar to the national averages. This is in contrast to Okinawa (opposite extreme in Japan), where there are almost as many registered vehicles as people, however 55.7% were kei cars in 2014.

== Maritime transport ==
=== Passenger ferries ===
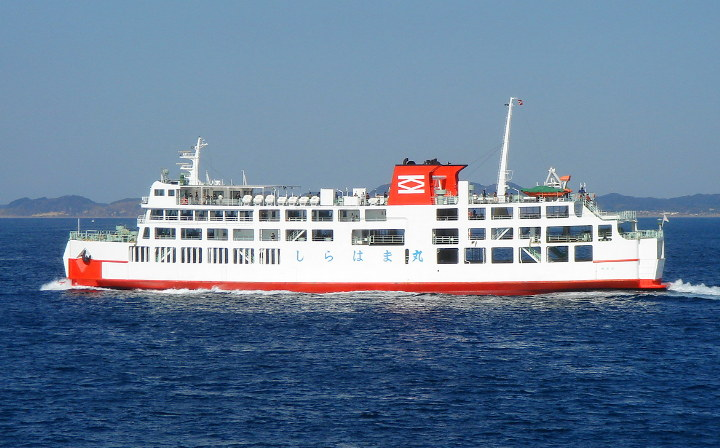
Tokyo-Wan Ferry Shirahama-maru

The notable route which serves as internal transport is Tokyo-Wan Ferry, the car-passenger ferry route between Yokosuka, Kanagawa and Futtsu, Chiba, crossing Tokyo Bay. Other passenger services within the bay are mostly used as scenic cruises, such as Tokyo Cruise Ship and Tokyo Mizube Line in Tokyo, The Port Service and Keihin Ferry Boat in Yokohama.

Out of the bay, the car-passenger ferries to the Izu Islands and the Ogasawara Islands, Shikoku, Kyūshū, the Amami Islands and Okinawa serve from the ports of Tokyo or Yokohama. The car-passenger ferries to Hokkaidō serve from Ōarai, Ibaraki. There are some other freight ferries (which can carry less than 13 passengers) serving out of the Bay.

=== Shipping ===
Shipping plays a crucial role for inbound and outbound freight, both domestic and international. The Port of Tokyo and Port of Yokohama are both major ports for Japan and Greater Tokyo.

== Air ==
=== Primary airports ===
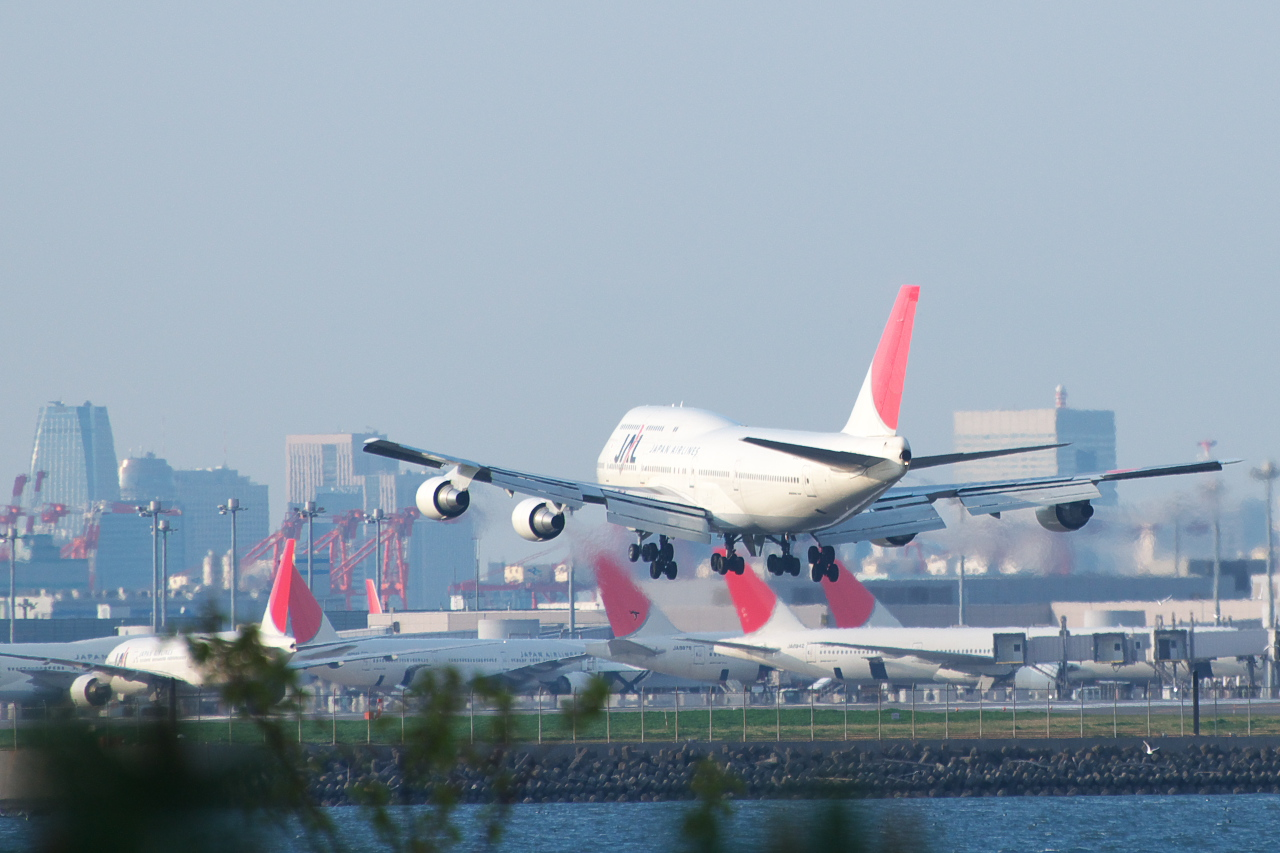
Tokyo Haneda Airport

Commercial flights in the region are served predominantly by Haneda Airport in Ōta, Tokyo which is the domestic hub for Japan's major airlines, and Narita International Airport in Narita, Chiba, which is the main international gateway airport for the region but has also recently become a new hub for some domestic flights.

=== Secondary airports ===
Chofu Airport in the city of Chōfu in western Tokyo handles commuter flights to the Izu Islands, which are administratively part of Tokyo. Tokyo Heliport in Kōtō serves public-safety and news traffic. In the Izu Islands, Ōshima Airport on Ōshima, Hachijōjima Airport on Hachijō, and Miyakejima Airport on Miyake provide air services.

Ibaraki Airport, located 85 km north of Tokyo, is a hub for low-cost carriers, with flights to Sapporo being the most popular. Shizuoka Airport, 175 km southwest of Tokyo, aims to be a more convenient alternative for Shizuoka residents than airports in Tokyo or Nagoya, however none of the above airports have shown to take away any significant traffic from Narita or Haneda and continue to play minor roles.

=== Military ===
In addition, the Greater Tokyo area has military bases with airfields:

- Hyakuri Air Base (JASDF)
- Tachikawa Airfield (JGSDF)
- Shimofusa Air Base (JMSDF)
- Tateyama Air Base (JMSDF)
- Kisarazu Air Field (JGSDF)
- Kasumigaura Air Field (JGSDF)
- Iruma Air Base (JASDF)
- Utsunomiya Air Field (JGSDF)
- Yokota Air Base (USAF/JASDF)
- NAF Atsugi (USN/JMSDF)

=== Helipads ===
There are also a limited number of helicopter transport services in Tokyo, with one service linking Narita airport with central Tokyo.

== Bicycle ==
Greater Tokyo is little different from the rest of Japan in regarding other modes of transport. It is home to the majority of Japan's automated bicycle systems with 14% of all commutes by bicycle and has a number of bicycle sharing systems. Docomo Bike Shares, Hello Cycling and Luup are among the most popular bicycle sharing service providers in Greater Tokyo, With Docomo Bike Shares holding the largest share of Bicycle sharing system usage. However, even though Docomo is widely accepted as the dominant shared bicycle supplier, it is viewed as an unreliable and difficult to use system by many, with its app having 2.1 stars on iOS app store and 2 stars on Tripadvisor

== See also ==
- Transport in Keihanshin (Greater Osaka)
- Transport in Greater Nagoya
- Transport in Fukuoka-Kitakyūshū
- List of urban rail systems in Japan
