= Sea bass (disambiguation) =

Sea bass is a common name of various species of fishes.

Sea bass or seabass may also refer to:

== Nickname ==
- Chris Bassitt (born 1989), pitcher for the Oakland Athletics
- Carlos Beltrán (born 1977), outfielder for the St. Louis Cardinals
- Sébastien Bourdais (born 1979), French Formula One driver and four-time Champ Car series winner
- Sébastien Chabal (born 1977), French international rugby player
- Sebastian Janikowski (born 1978), Oakland Raiders kicker
- Sebastian Stan (born 1982), Romanian-American actor
- Sebastian Vollmer (born 1984), New England Patriots tackle

== Other uses ==
- Seabass (band), Australian band who won the 2020 APRA AMCOS Emily Burrows Award
- SS Sea Bass, two ships
- Sea Bass, a ferry operated by The Port Service, Yokohama, Japan
- Sea Bass, a character in the film Dumb and Dumber and other films, played by Cam Neely
- SeaBASS (SeaWiFS Bio-optical Archive and Storage System), an oceanography data archive

== See also ==
- Bard Bleimor, the bardic name of Yann-Ber Kalloc'h ("bleimor" means "sea bass" in Breton)
- Bass (disambiguation)
