= Thames Leisure =

- London River Services
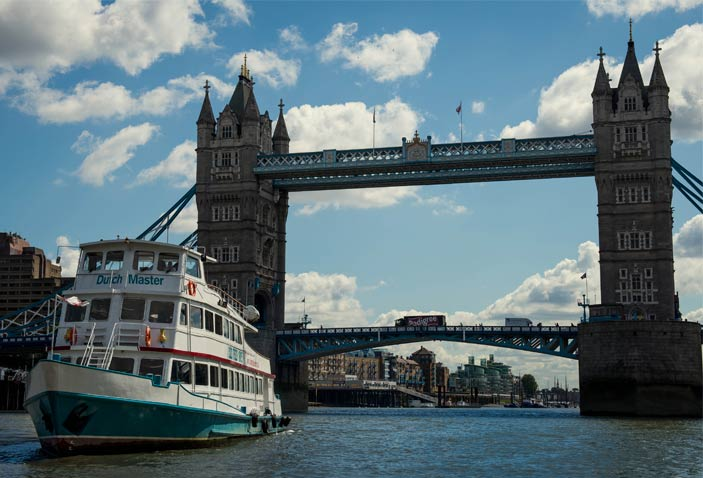
- Dutch Master by Tower Bridge
- Locale: London, UK
- Waterway: River Thames
- Transit type: Leisure/tourist cruises
- Operator: Thames Leisure
- No. of vessels: 4
- Website: www.thamesleisure.co.uk

Thames Leisure is a river boat company which provides leisure cruises for both corporate and private clients on the River Thames in London, United Kingdom.

Established in 1984, Thames Leisure acquired Tideway in 1987 and ran hourly cruises from Westminster to the Tate gallery and London Bridge. The fleet later expanded with the arrival of William B in 1998 and Dutch Master in 2001.

In 2019, the company planned to restore a disused pier adjacent to London Bridge and Cannon Street station that had been in use for 400 years before demolition in 2012.

== Vessels ==
Thames Leisure has a fleet of four boats:

- "Dutch Master" – a river cruiser for up to 350 guests. Often used by events promoters on the Thames, such as Pukka Up and Unleash.
- "William B" – vessel with large open deck for up to 120 guests, often used for corporate hospitality and birthdays. William B was originally built as the Sir Thomas More for Thames Guided Tours in 1982, and was later sold to Thames Television in 1988 who used her for private trips based in Teddington. She was bought by Thames Leisure in 1999 and renamed William B.
- "Tideway" – a small vessel for up to 85 guests used for river transport, small gatherings and sight-seeing tours.
- "Sailing Barge Will" – historic vessel for up to 50 guests, based at Canary Wharf.
