= Keihin =

Keihin (京浜, Keihin) usually refers to the area around Tokyo and Yokohama in Japan. It comes from the second character of the cities' native name: 東京 and 横浜.

Keihin may also refer to:

- Keihin region, Japan
- Keihin Corporation, a brand of motorcycle and powersports carburetor, common on Japanese and other motorcycles, including Harley-Davidson
- Keihin-Tōhoku Line, a railway line in Japan
- Keihin Ferry Boat, a ship operating company in Yokohama
- Keihin Kyuko, a private railroad in Japan
- Keihin Ports, the joint management organization for the ports of Kawasaki and Yokohama
