= Ariake West Canal =

Canal in Japan

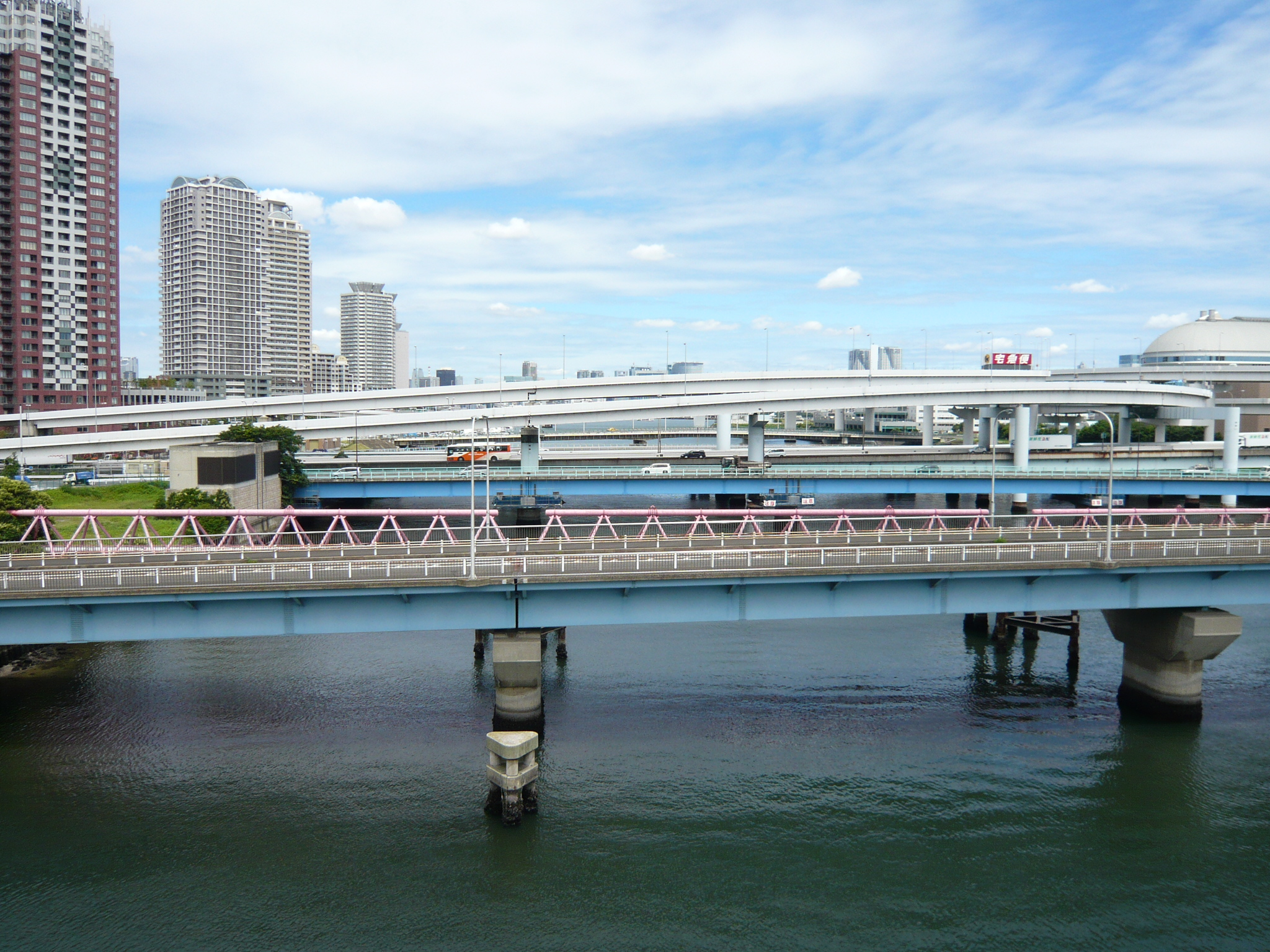
Bridge over the West Canal

The Ariake West Canal is a canal located between Ariake, Koto-ku, in Tokyo and Odaiba, Minato-ku.

== Geography ==
It is located between Ariake at No. 10 and Daiba at No. 13 in the reclaimed land of Tokyo Bay. Both banks are part of Tokyo Waterfront City, and there are many bridges, like Yume no Ohashi, are at short intervals for transit between the two sides. There are also water bus routes for Tokyo Cruise Ship and Tokyo Mizube Line. The cauldron for the 2020 Summer Olympics and 2020 Summer Paralympics was installed at Tokyo Waterfront City.
