= Water taxi =

Public or private transportation vessel

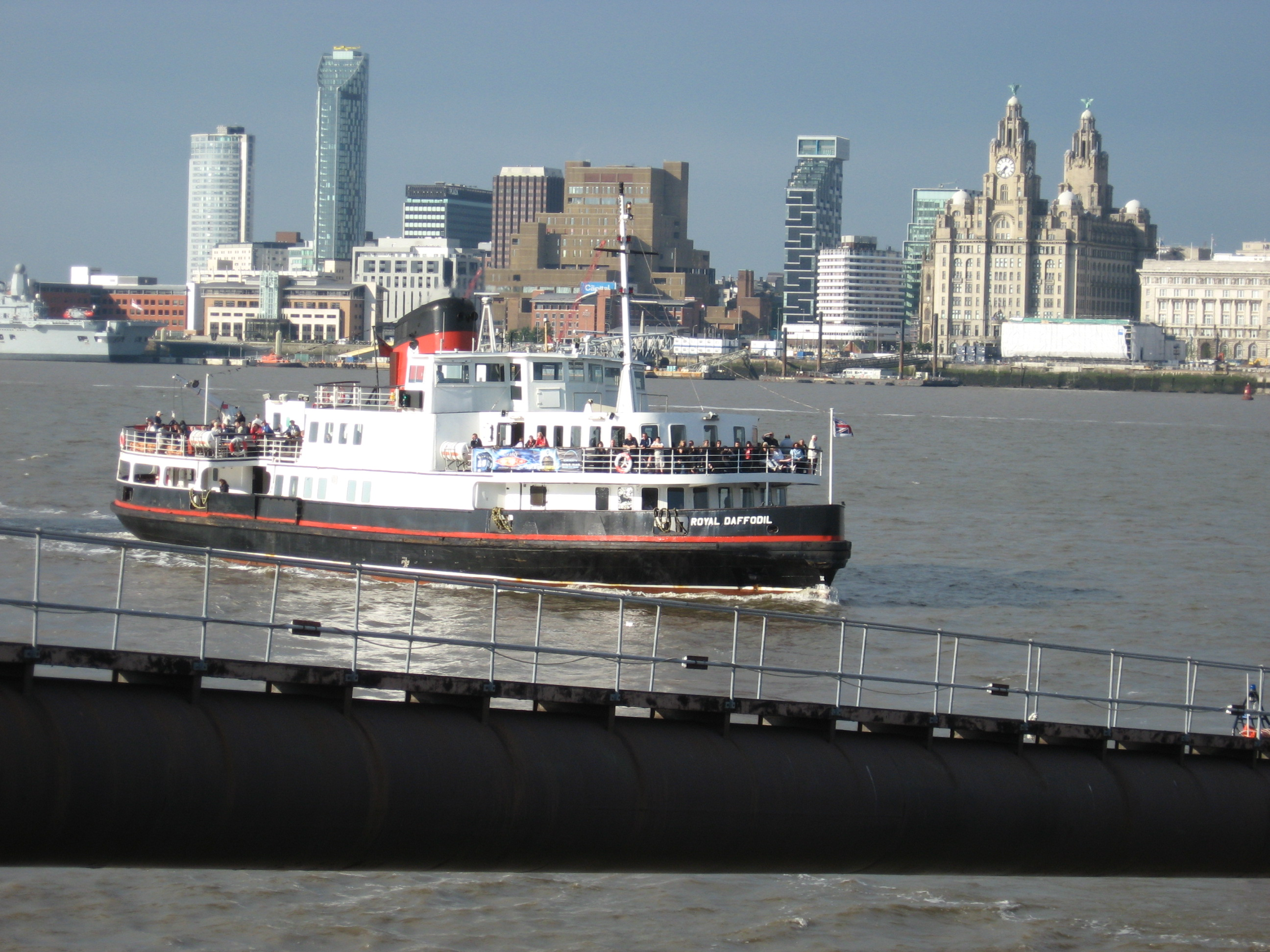
Royal Daffodil ship in Liverpool, Mersey Ferry

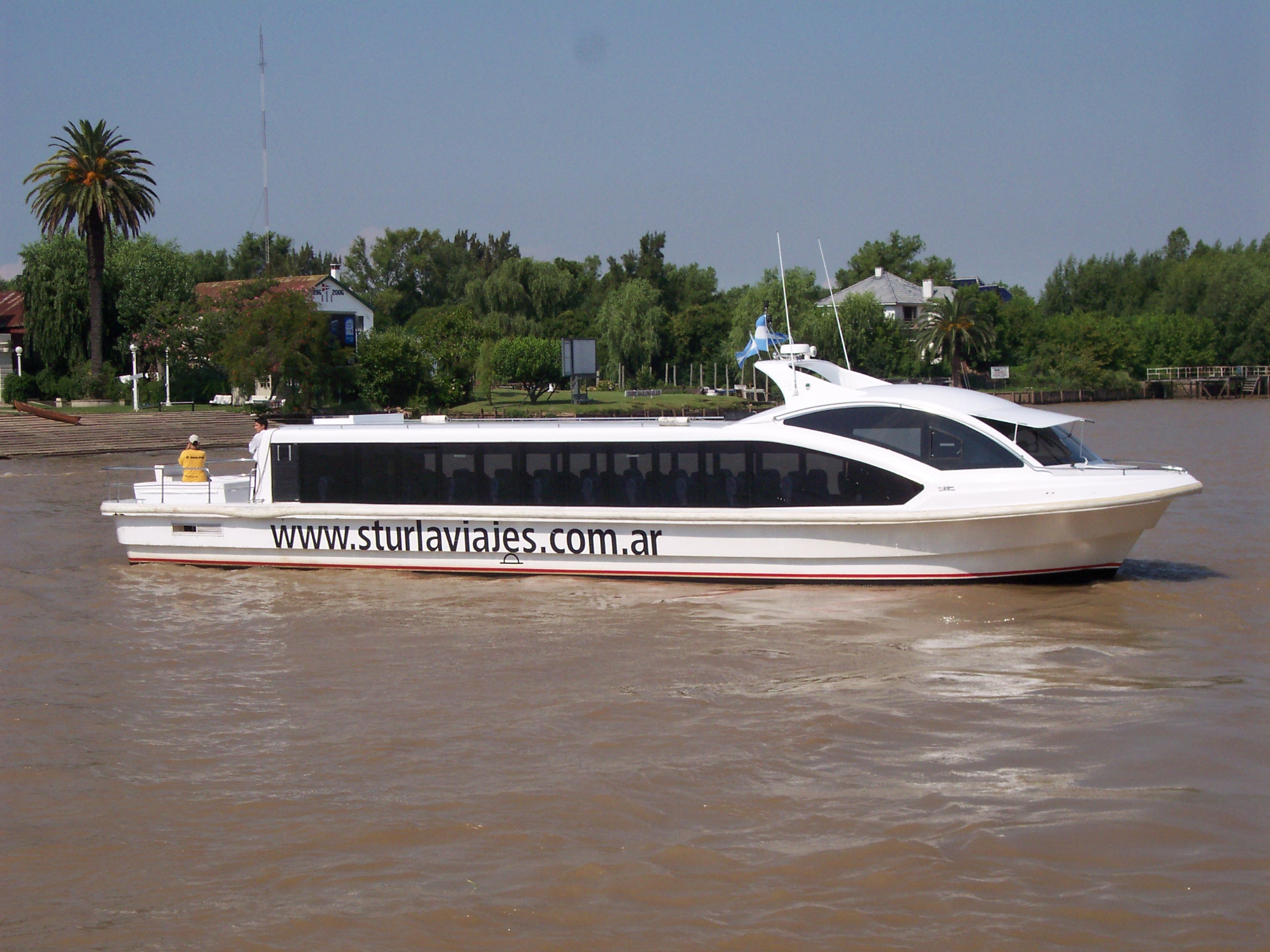
Water Bus in Tigre, Buenos Aires

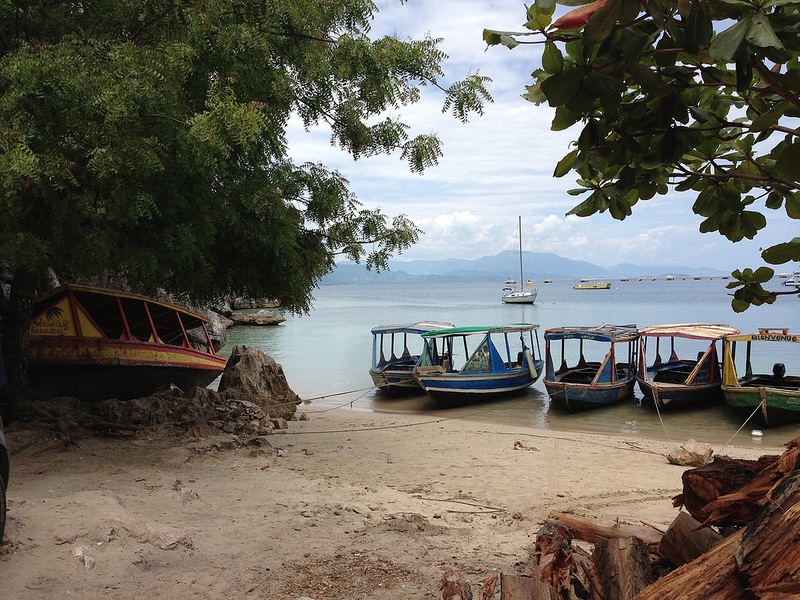
Water taxis parked at Labadie Beach, Haiti

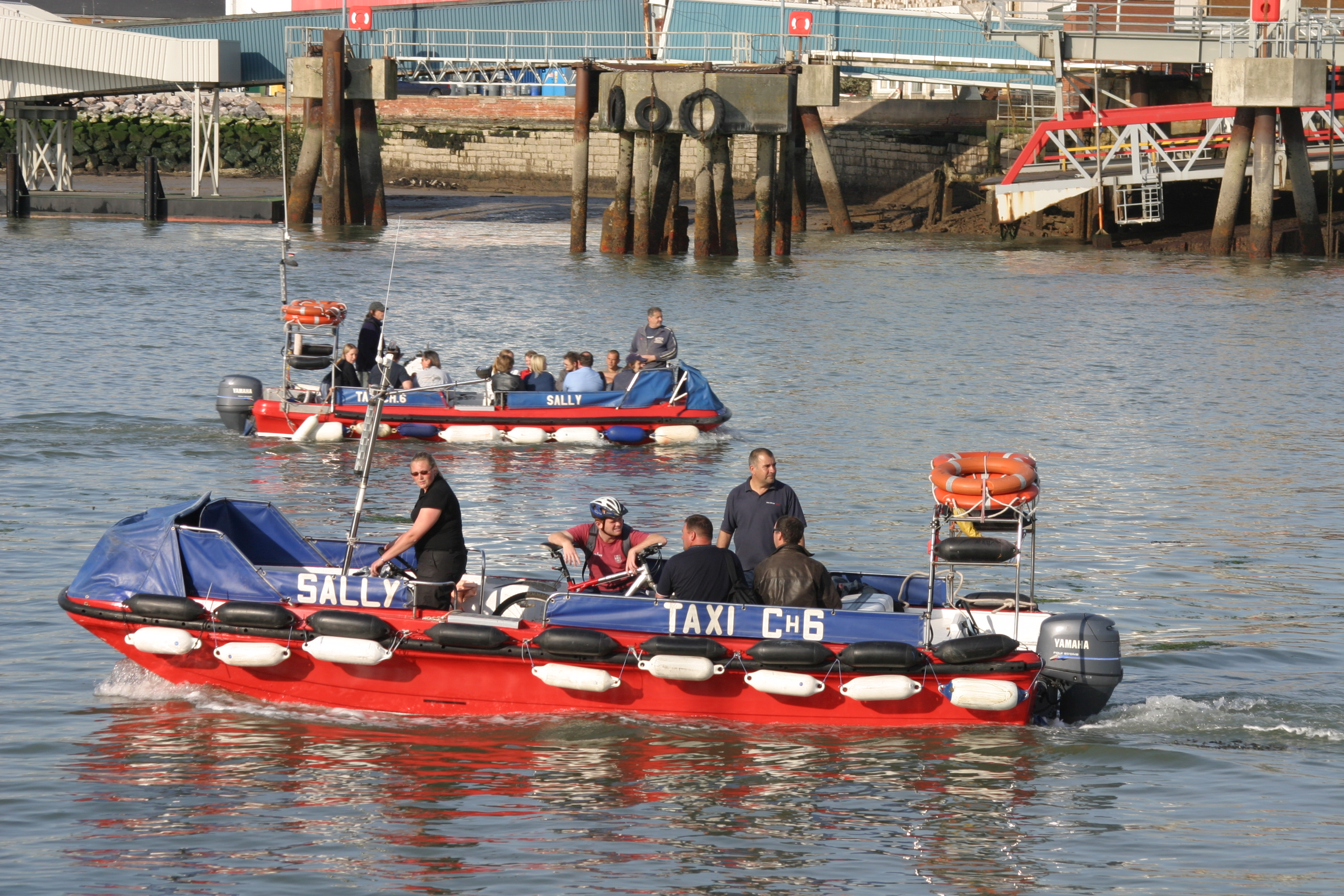
Water Taxis, Cowes, Isle of Wight

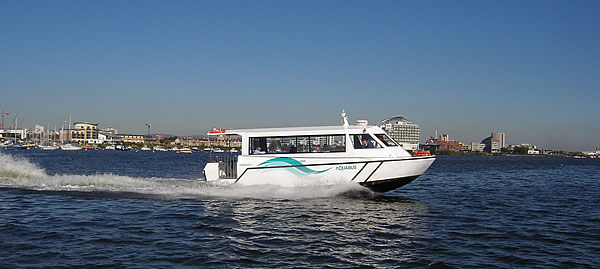
Water bus in Cardiff

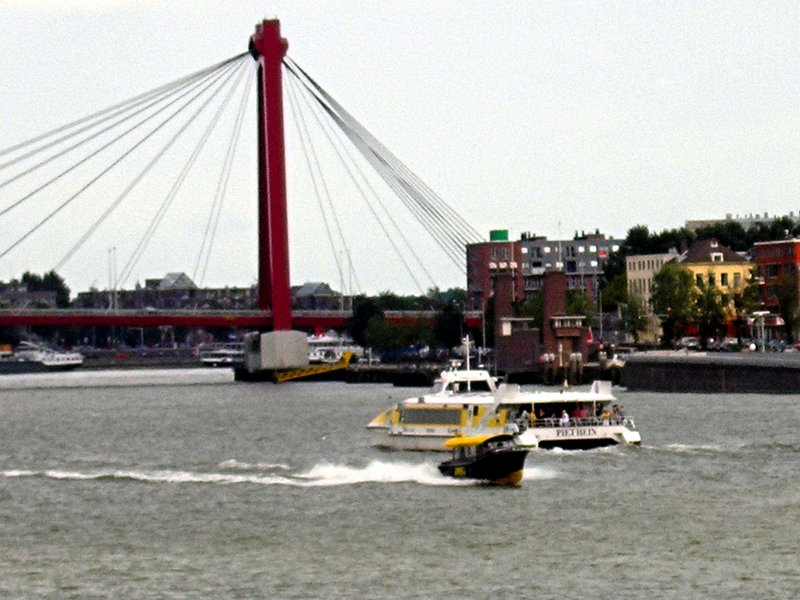
Water taxi meets water bus in Rotterdam

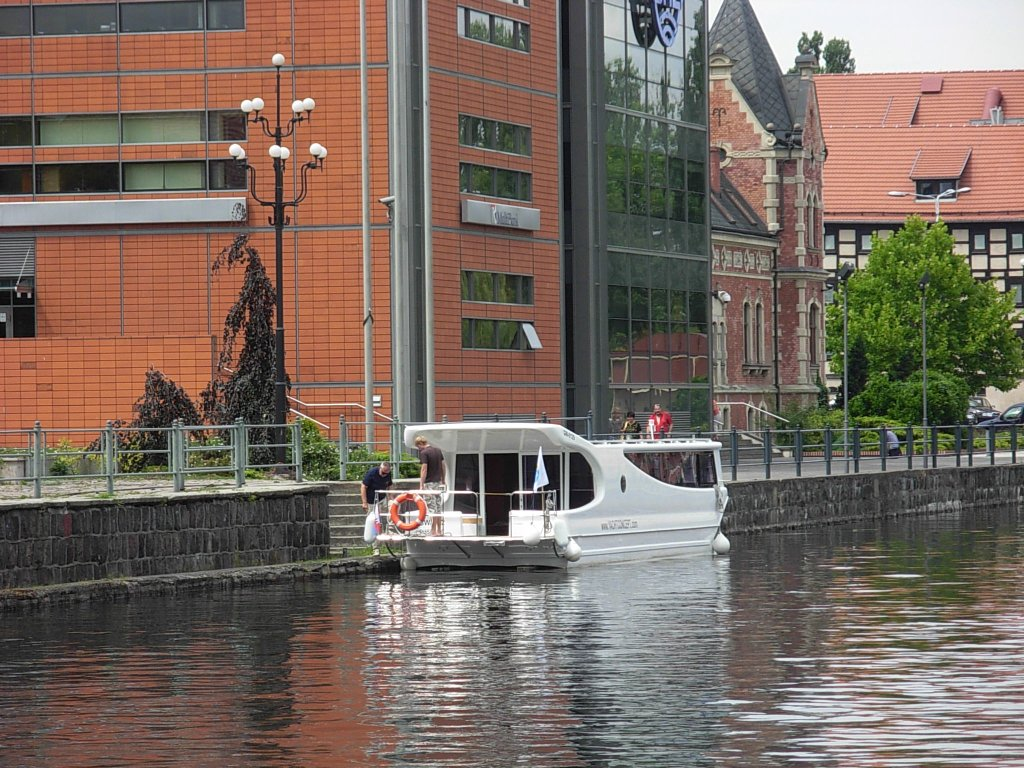
Water bus in Bydgoszcz, Poland

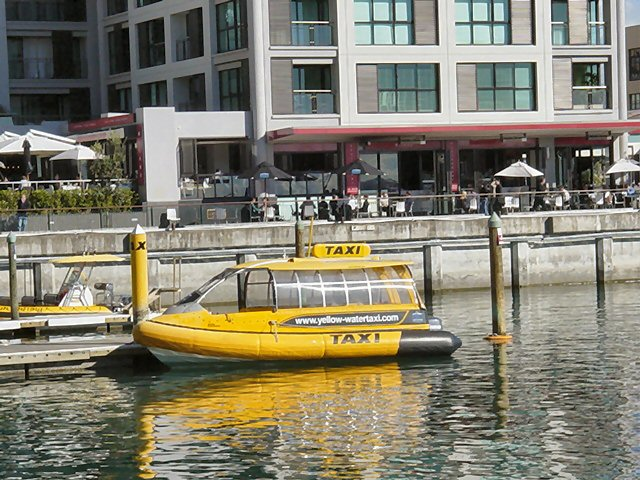
Water taxi in Auckland

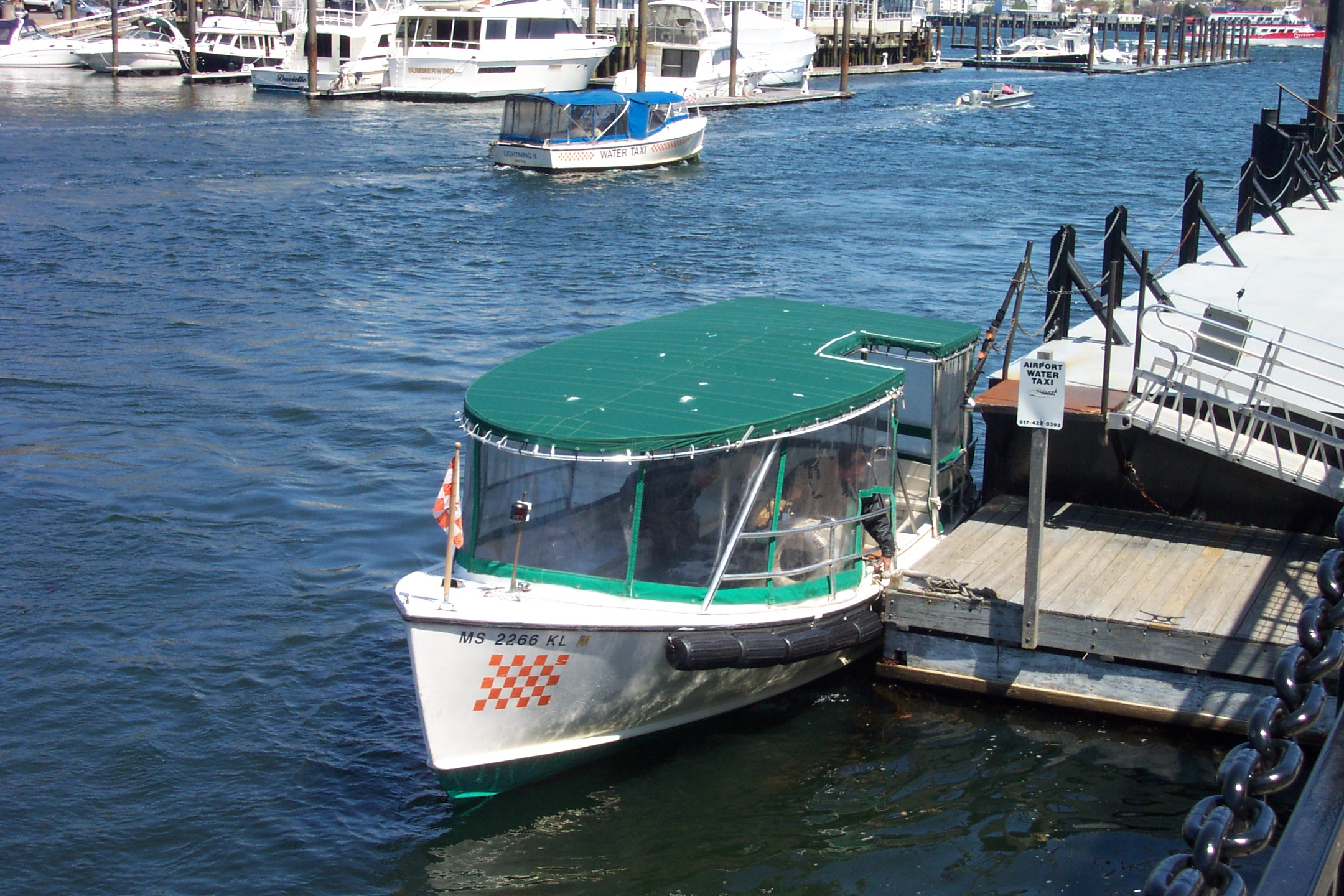
A pair of water taxis operating on the waterfront of Boston

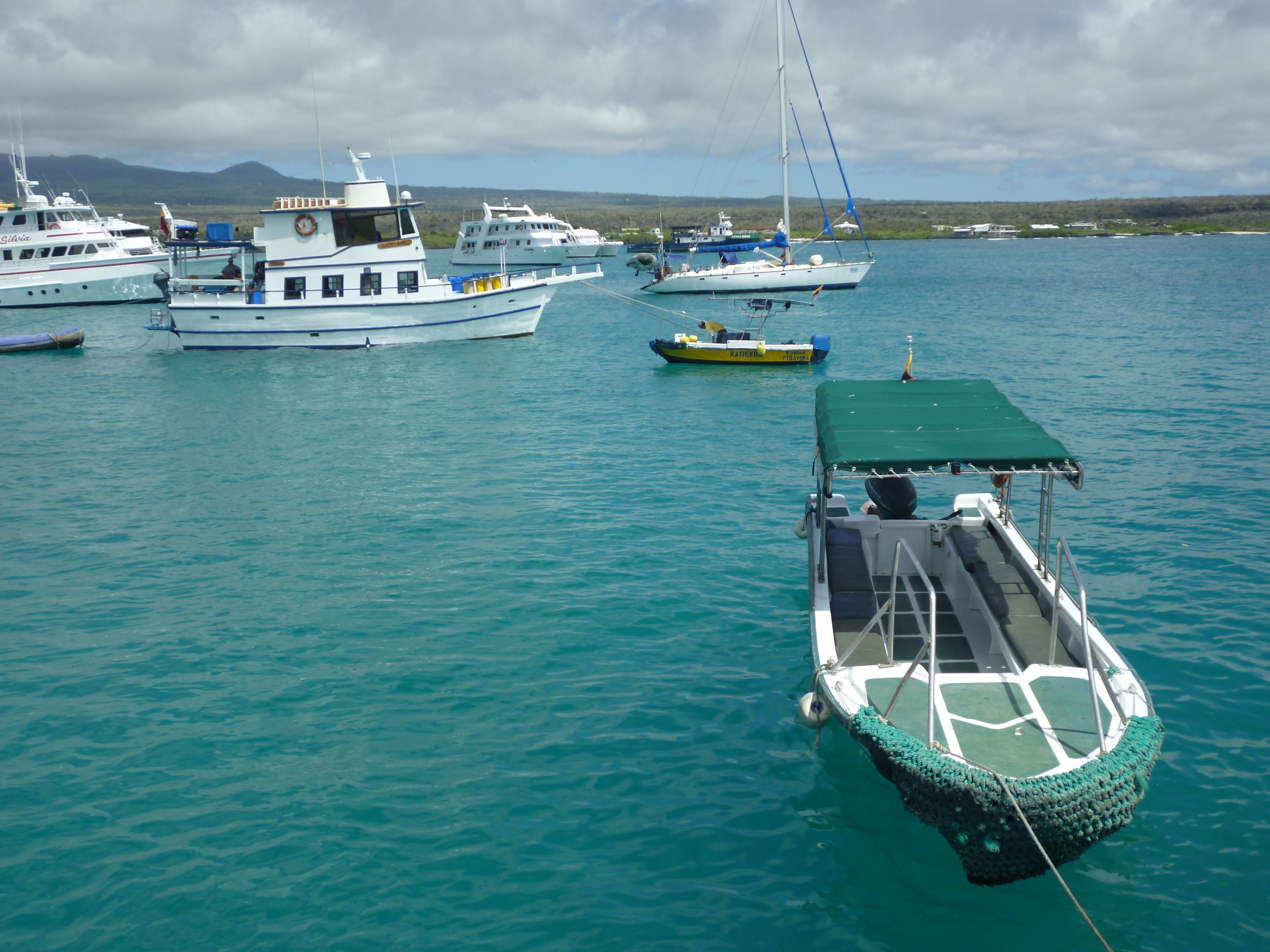
A water taxi operating on the waterfront in Puerto Ayora, Galapagos Island of Santa Cruz.

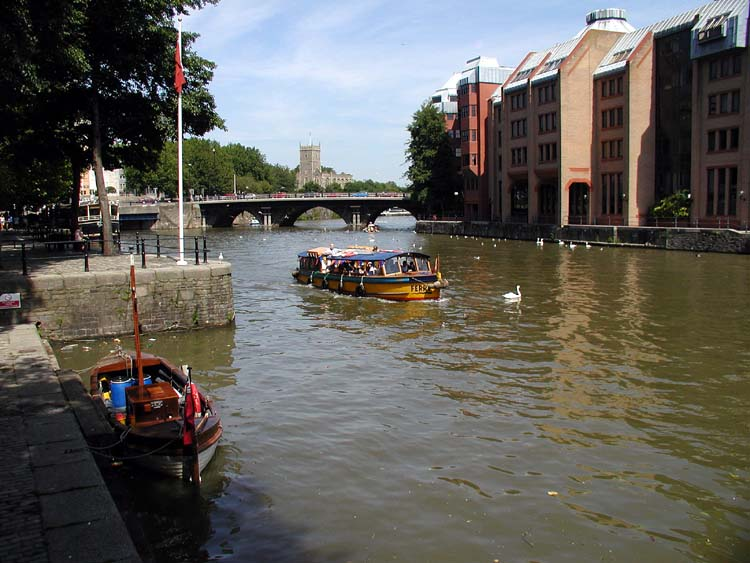
Water bus in Bristol Harbour

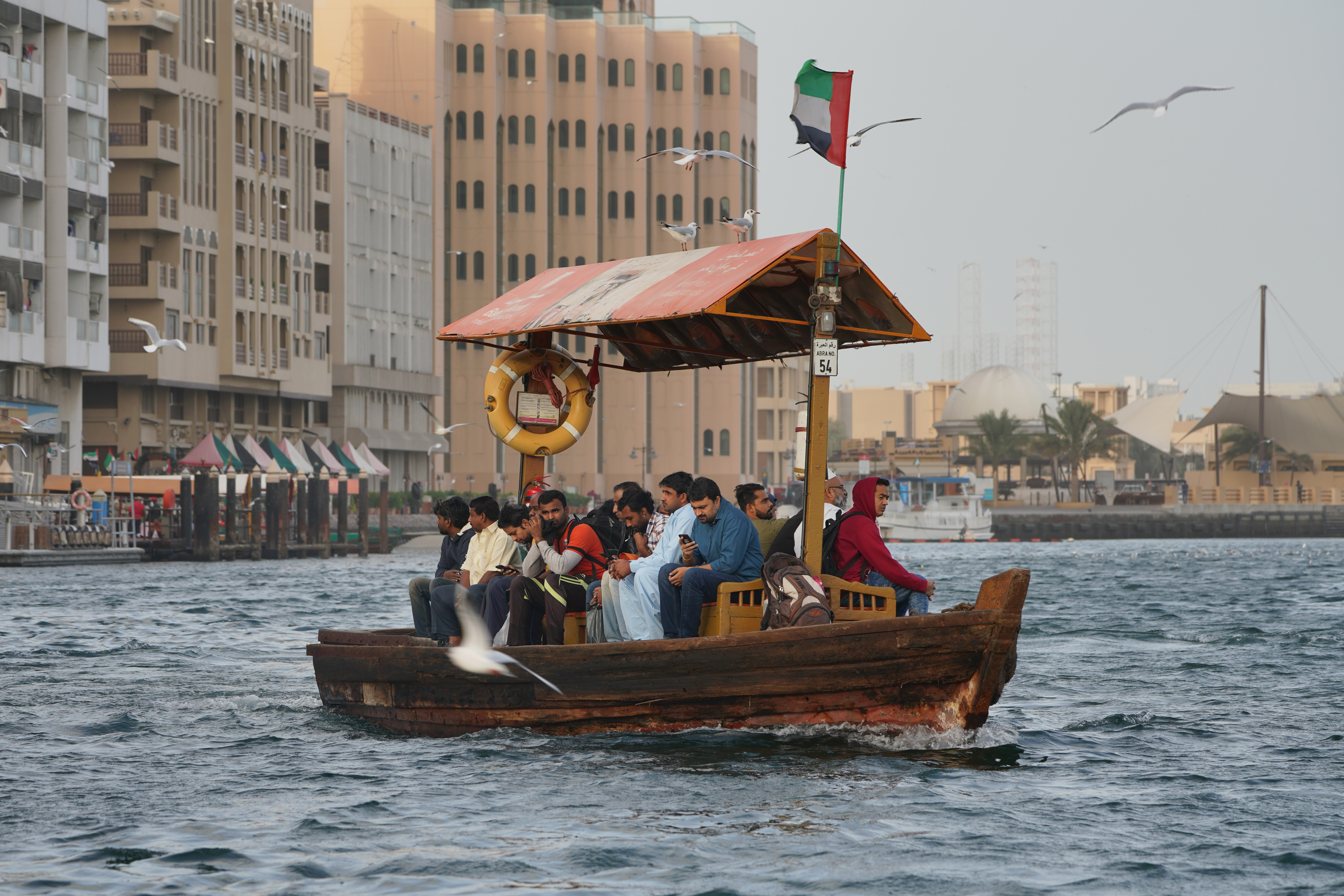
Abra in Dubai

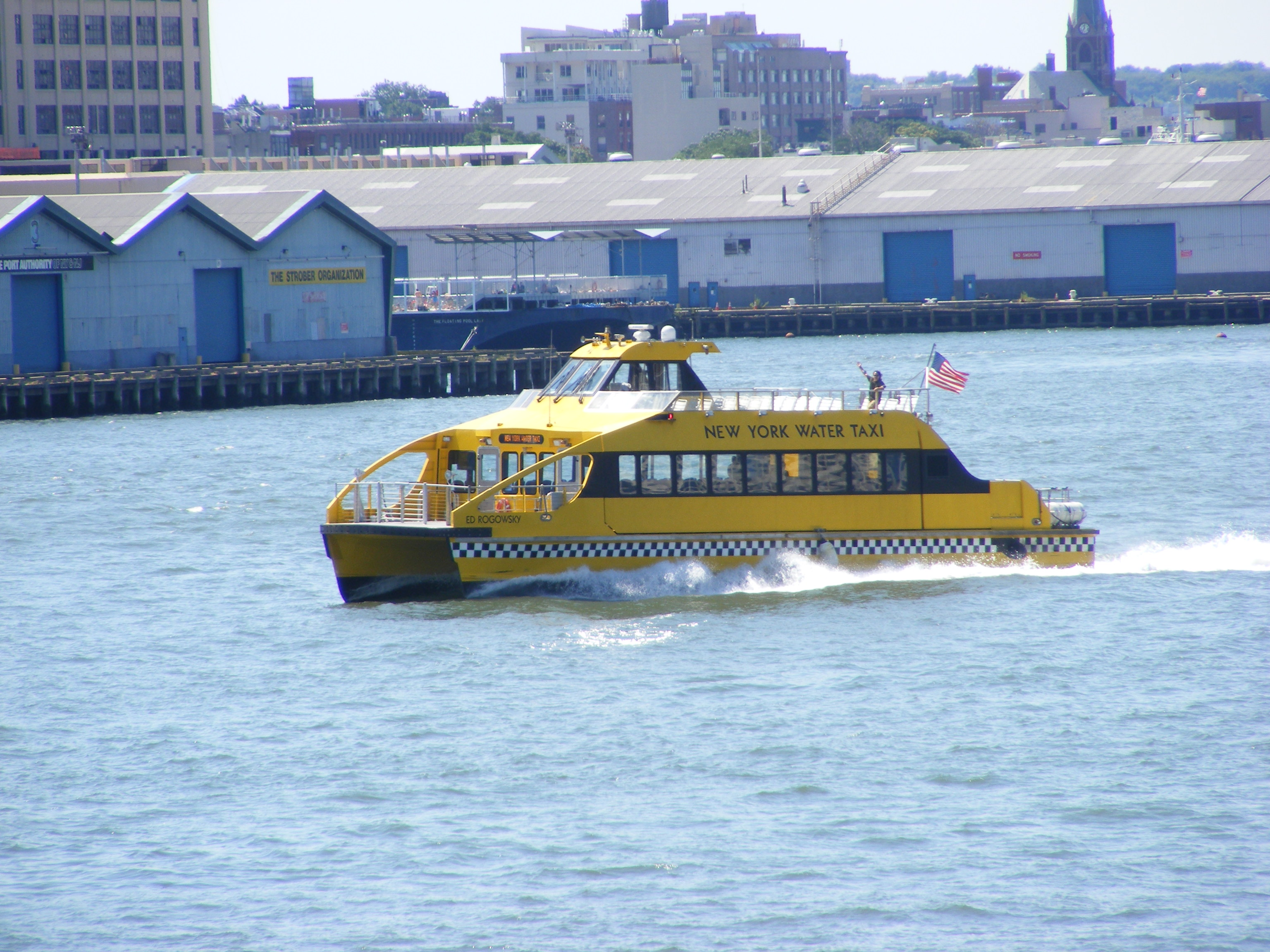
New York Water Taxi

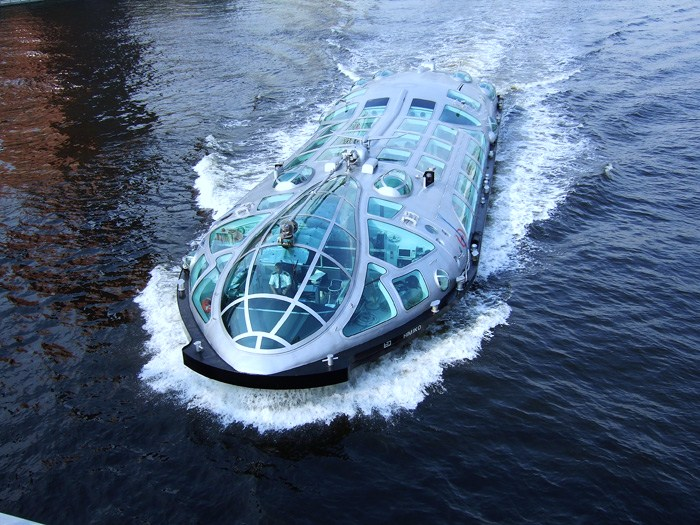
Tokyo Water bus

A water taxi or a water bus is a boat used to provide public or private transport, usually, but not always, in an urban environment. Service may be scheduled with multiple stops, operating in a similar manner to a bus, or on demand to many locations, operating in a similar manner to a taxi. A boat service shuttling between two points would normally be described as a ferry rather than a water bus or taxi.

The term water taxi is usually confined to a boat operating on demand, and water bus to a boat operating on a schedule. In North American usage, the terms are roughly synonymous.

The earliest water taxi service was recorded as operating around the area that became Manchester, England.

== Locations ==
Cities and other places operating water buses and/or taxis include:

- Alapuzha Water Taxi
- Auckland
- Bahrain
- Bangkok
  - Chao Phraya Express Boat
  - Khlong Saen Saep boat service
  - Khlong Phadung Krung Kasem boat service
  - Khlong Phasi Charoen boat service
- Bremen
- Brisbane
  - CityCat
  - CityFerry
- Brunei
- Brussels
- Buenos Aires, Tigre
- Cap-Haïtien, Haiti (at Labadee beach)
- Cape Town
- Caye Caulker
- Davao City
  - Davao water taxi service
- Dhaka
  - Buriganga River water bus
  - Hatirjheel water taxi
- Dubai
  - Abras
  - RTA water taxis (recently introduced)
- Galápagos Islands
- Guangzhou, China
- Halifax Regional Municipality
- Ho Chi Minh City
  - Saigon Waterbus
- Hong Kong
  - Cheung Chau, Chi Ma Wan, Peng Chau, Silvermine Bay
  - Sun Ferry
  - Sha Lo Wan, Tai O, Tuen Mun, Tung Chung (Urmston Road, Hong Kong)
- Istanbul
- Karachi
- Kobe
- Kochi
  - Kochi Water Metro
- Lorient
- Malta
  - Dghajsa
- Manila
  - Pasig River Ferry Service
- Mumbai (Catamarans and ferries)
- New Zealand
- Niigata
- Nur-Sultan
- Osaka
  - Osaka Suijō Bus
- Panama
- San Martín de los Andes
- Seoul
- Shizuoka
- Singapore (Singapore River)
- Sydney
- Timișoara
- Tokyo
  - Tokyo Cruise Ship
  - Tokyo Mizube Line
- Toronto
  - Toronto water taxis
- Trinidad
  - Water Taxi Service, Port of Spain to San Fernando – service implemented in December 2008
- Trogir
- Victoria, British Columbia
  - Victoria Harbour
- Vancouver
  - The Aquabus
  - Coastal Link Ferries
  - English Bay Launch
  - False Creek Ferries
  - Granville Island Water Taxi Services (defunct)
  - SeaBus
- Venice
  - Gondola
  - Vaporetto
- Walt Disney World
- Wellington
  - Ferries in Wellington
- Winnipeg
- Xochimilco, Mexico City
  - Chalupa
- Yokohama
  - Keihin Ferry Boat
  - The Port Service

=== Europe ===
- Amsterdam
- Antwerp
- Berlin (see: de:Fährverkehr in Berlin)
- Bordeaux
  - Boats BatCub
- Bristol
  - Bristol Ferry Boats
- Brussels
- Bucharest
- Budapest
- Bydgoszcz, Poland
- Cardiff
  - Cardiff Waterbus
- Copenhagen
  - Copenhagen Harbour Buses
- Gdańsk
- Geneva
  - Mouettes Genevoises
- Gothenburg
  - Älvsnabben ferry
  - Paddan
- Hamburg
  - HADAG
- Helsinki
- Hertford
- Kragerø and surrounding area, Norway
- Kristiansund, Norway
- Leeds
- Lisbon
  - Transtejo & Soflusa
- London
  - London River Services
  - Uber Boat by Thames Clippers
- Marseille
- Moscow
  - Moscow Regular River Transport
- Nantes
  - Navibus
- Oslo
  - NBDS
  - Oslo-Fergene
- Paris
  - Batobus
  - Voguéo
- Potsdam, Germany
- Rotterdam/Dordrecht
- Saint Petersburg
  - Aquabus
- Spalding (River Welland)
- Stockholm
- Tallinn

=== USA ===
- Alexandria, Virginia
- Annapolis, Maryland
- Baltimore
  - Baltimore Water Taxi
- Boston
- Charleston
- Chicago
- Erie, Pennsylvania
  - Presque Isle Water Taxi
- Fort Lauderdale
- Jacksonville, Florida
  - Jacksonville Water Taxi
- Lake Ozark, Missouri
- Laughlin, Nevada and Bullhead City, Arizona
- Long Beach, California
  - Long Beach Transit
- National Harbor, Maryland
- New York City
  - Liberty Water Taxi
  - New York Water Taxi
  - NYC Ferry
- New Orleans - Baton Rouge, Louisiana: Mississippi River from mouth to Baton Rouge, Louisiana; Belle Chasse Marine, Port Ship Service, Crescent Ship Service and Weber Marine.
- Oklahoma City
- Orlando, Florida
- Sacramento
- San Francisco
  - SF Water Taxi
- Seattle
  - King County Water Taxi
- Tampa
- Pittsburgh
- Plymouth
- Portland, Maine
- Quad Cities, Illinois/Iowa

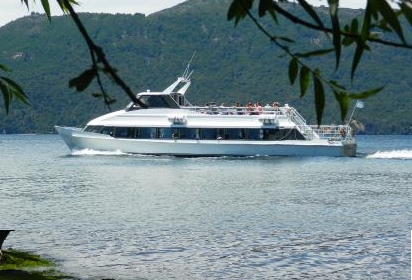
Water taxi in San Martín de los Andes

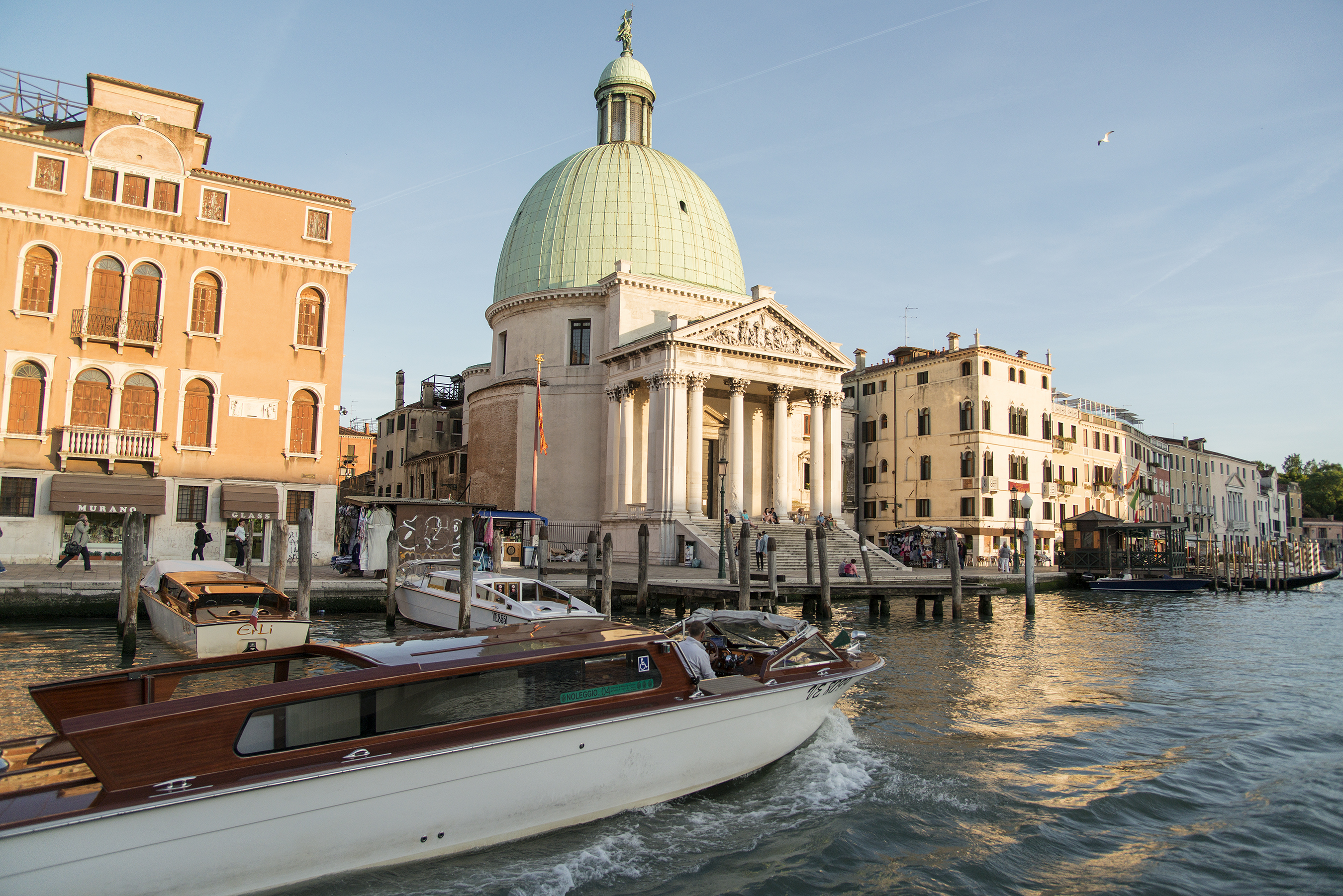
Water taxi near the train station, Grand Canal, Venice

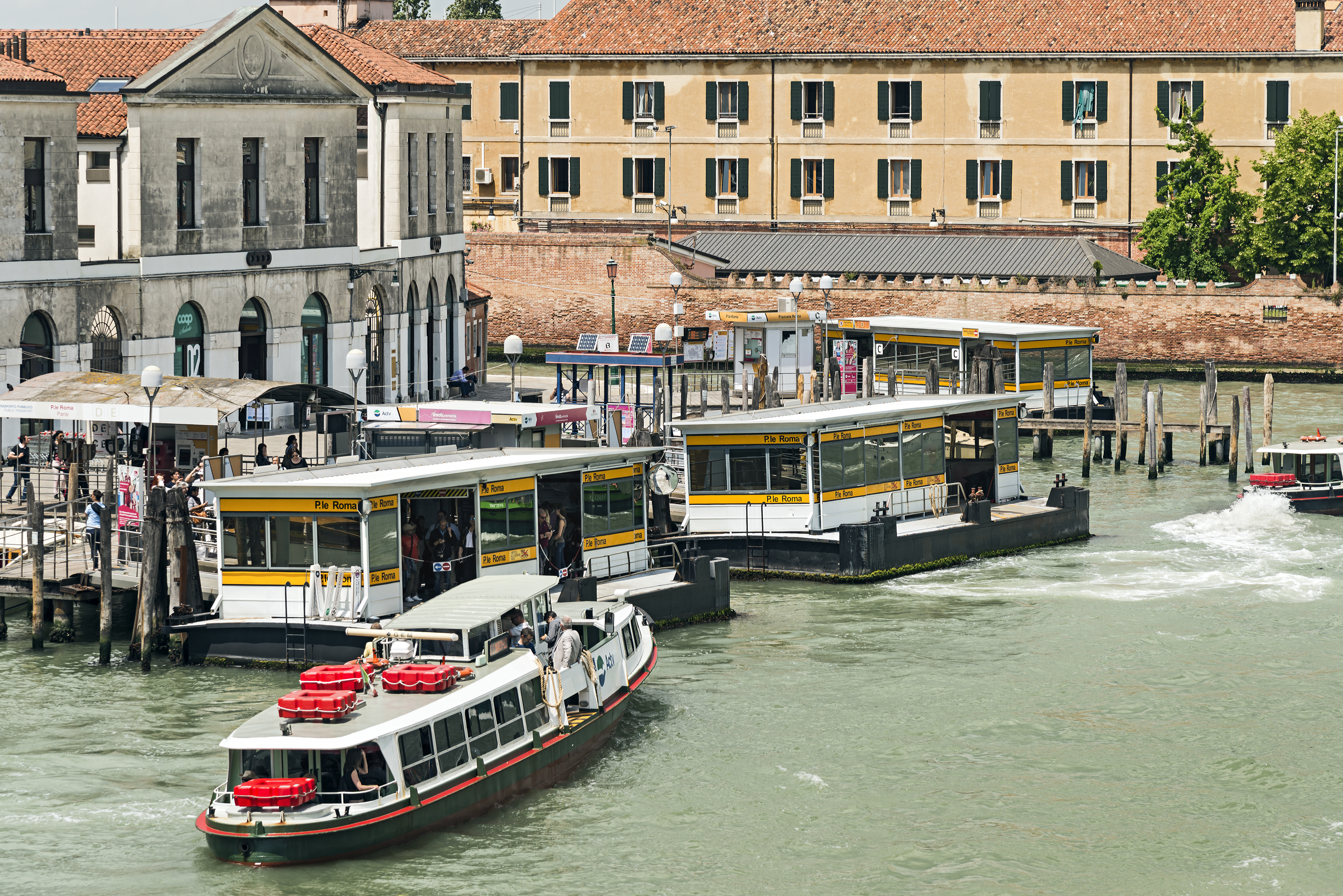
Vaporetto and bus stops in Venice

On demand water taxis are also commonly found in marinas, harbours and cottage areas, providing access to boats and waterfront properties that are not directly accessible by land.

== Incidents ==
On March 6, 2004, a water taxi on the Seaport Taxi service operated by the Living Classrooms Foundation capsized during a storm on the Patapsco River, near Baltimore's Inner Harbor. A total of five passengers died in the accident, which the National Transportation Safety Board determined was caused by insufficient stability when the small pontoon-style vessel encountered strong winds and waves. The company no longer operates water taxi vessels in Baltimore harbor.

== See also ==
- Duffy-Herreshoff watertaxi
- Ferry, including hydrofoil, catamaran and hovercraft
- Klotok
- Moskvitch-class motorship - Soviet "water tramway"
- Pleasure barge
- Rower woman
- Ship's tender
