= SS Sea Bass =

SS Sea Bass may refer to one of two Type C3-S-A2 ships built for the United States Maritime Commission by Western Pipe and Steel:

- SS Sea Bass (1942) (MC hull number 268), delivered on 31 March 1943; sold 1946; scrapped in 1973
- SS Sea Bass (1943) (MC hull number 275), acquired by the United States Navy and converted to Bayfield-class attack transport USS Bayfield (AP-78/APA-33); scrapped in 1969

== See also ==
- Sea Bass, a ship operated by The Port Service, Yokohama, Japan
