= Tokyo Mizube Line =

Water bus service in Tokyo, Japan

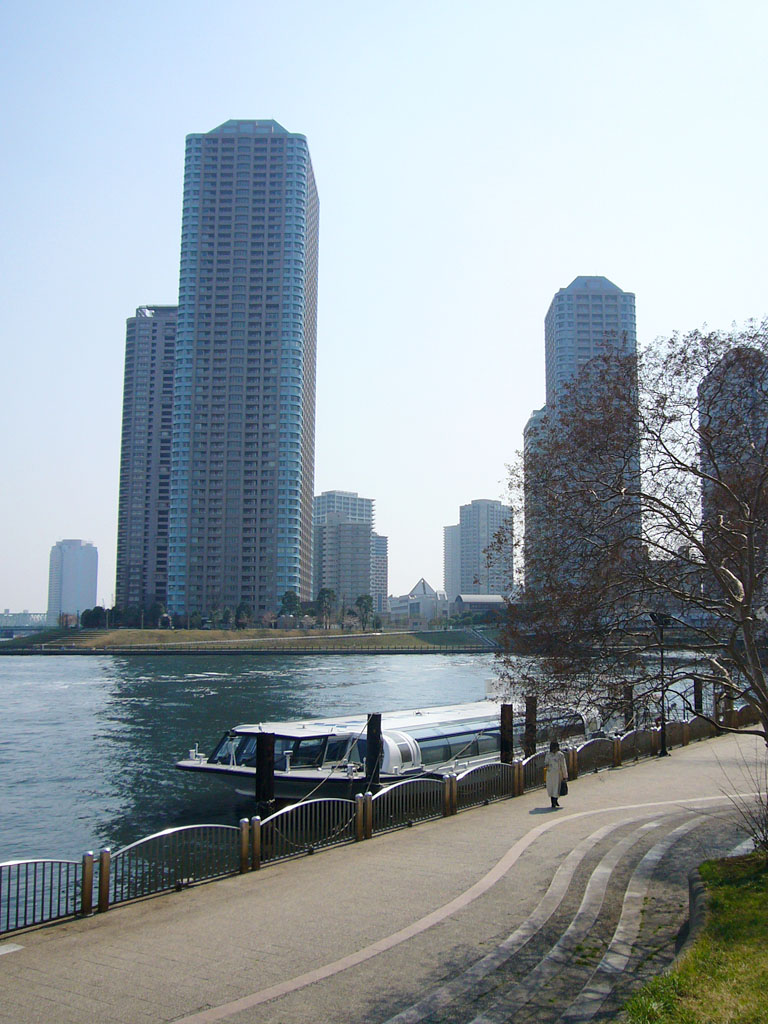
- Tokyo Mizube Line ship on Sumida River, in front of Ōkawabata River City 21.
- Locale: Tokyo, Japan
- Waterway: Port of Tokyo, Sumida River, and Arakawa River.
- Transit type: Water bus
- Operator: Tokyo Metropolitan Park Association
- No. of lines: 1 daily line, 7 weekend lines
- No. of terminals: 16

The Tokyo Mizube Line (東京水辺ライン, Tōkyō Mizube Rain; "Tokyo Waterfront Line") is a water bus service in Tokyo. A public company called Tokyo Metropolitan Park Association (東京都公園協会, Tōkyō-to Kōen Kyōkai) operates the lines on Tokyo riverside. The services include public lines listed below, as well as event cruises and chartered ships. All lines close on Monday (or the next day if Monday is a holiday), and between December 29 and January 3.

== Lines ==
Arrows (→) indicate ships only go that direction. Dashes (—) indicate ships go both directions. English line names are tentative translations.

■ Ryōgoku Odaiba Cruise (両国・お台場クルーズ, Ryōgoku Odaiba Kurūzu)

Sakurabashi — Ryōgoku — Etchūjima — Akashichō-Seirokagarden — Hama-rikyū — Odaiba-kaihinkōen

(Everyday)

■ Seaside Course (シーサイドコース, Shīsaido Kōsu)

Odaiba-kaihinkōen → (Seaside) → Kasairinkaikouen
Kasairinkaikouen → (Ariake West Canal) → Odaiba-kaihinkōen

(Every weekends/holidays, some weekdays)

■ Tokyo Bay Course (TOKYO ベイコース, Tōkyō Bei Kōsu)

Ryōgoku — Etchūjima — Akashichō-Seirokagarden — Hama-rikyū — Odaiba-kaihinkōen — (Ariake West Canal) — Tokyo-Big-Site — Kasairinkaikouen

(Every weekends/holidays, some weekdays)

■ Twilight Cruise Odaiba (トワイライトクルーズお台場, Towairaito Kurūzu Odaiba)

Ryōgoku — Odaiba-kaihinkōen

(Some weekends/holidays)

■ Stroll Trip Wavy Trip (Upstream) (ぶらり旅・ゆらり旅(上流部), Burari-tabi Yurari-tabi (Jōryū-bu))

Azusawa — Kamiya — Arakawayūen — Senju — Sakurabashi — Ryōgoku

(Some weekends/holidays)

■ Edo-Tokyo Stroll Trip (江戸・東京 ぶらり旅, Edo-Tōkyō Burari-tabi)

Ryōgoku → Etchūjima → Akashichō-Seirokagarden → Hama-rikyū → Odaiba-kaihinkōen → (Ariake West Canal) → Tokyo-Big-Site → Kasairinkaikouen → (Arakawa Lock Gate) → Hirai → Senju → Sakurabashi → Ryōgoku

(Some Saturdays)

■ All Day Wavy Trip (い・ち・に・ち ゆらり旅, I-chi-ni-chi Yurari-tabi)

Ryōgoku → Hamachō → Etchūjima → Akashichō-Seirokagarden → Hama-rikyū → Odaiba-kaihinkōen → Fune-no-Kagakukan → Kasairinkaikouen → Hirai → (Iwabuchi Sluice) → Azusawa → Kamiya → Arakawayūen → Senju → Sakurabashi → Ryōgoku

(Some Sundays/holidays)

■ Ryōgoku Rainbow Bridge Excursion (両国レインボーブリッジ周遊, Ryōgoku Reibō Burijji Shūyū)

Ryōgoku → (Rainbow Bridge) → Ryōgoku

(Some weekends/holidays)

== Landing fields ==
Name	Japanese	Transfers	Facilities	Location
Ryōgoku	両国	JR: ■ Chūō-Sōbu Line (3 min. walk from Ryōgoku); Toei: ○ Ōedo Line (6 min. walk Ryōgoku, E-12)	Ryōgoku Kokugikan, Edo-Tokyo Museum, Former Yasuda Garden	Sumida
Hamachō	浜町	Toei: ○ Shinjuku Line (4 min. walk from Hamachō, S-10), ○ Asakusa Line (7 min. walk from Higashi-Nihombashi, A-15)	Hamachō Park	Chūō
Etchūjima	越中島	JR: ■ Keiyō Line (5 min. walk from Etchūjima)	Etchūjima Park, Nakanoshima Park, Ōkawabata River City 21	Kōtō
Akashichō- Seirokagarden	明石町聖路加ガーデン前	Tokyo Metro: ○ Hibiya Line (7 min. walk from Tsukiji, H-10)	Saint Luke's Tower, St. Luke's International Hospital	Chūō
Hama-rikyū	浜離宮	JR: ■ Keihin-Tōhoku Line, ■ Tōkaidō Main Line, ■ Yamanote Line, and ■ Yokosuka Line (All 10 min. walk from Shimbashi); Toei: ○ Asakusa Line (10min. walk from Shimbashi, A-10), ○ Ōedo Line (5 min. walk from Shiodome, E-19, or 7 min. walk from Tsukijishijō, E-18); Tokyo Cruise Ship (Hamarikyū, same place); Tokyo Metro: ○ Ginza Line (10 min. walk from Shimbashi, G-08); Yurikamome (5 min. walk from Shiodome, U-02)	Hamarikyū Gardens, Tsukiji fish market, Shiodome	Chūō
Odaiba-kaihinkōen	お台場海浜公園	Tokyo Cruise Ship (Odaiba Seaside Park, same place); Yurikamome (5 min. walk from Daiba, U-07)	Odaiba Kaihin Park, Aqua City Odaiba, Decks Tokyo Beach, Fuji Television	Minato
Fune-no-Kagakukan	船の科学館	Tokyo Cruise Ship (Museum of Maritime Science, same place); Yurikamome (5 min. walk from Tokyo International Cruise Terminal, U-08)	Museum of Maritime Science, Shiokaze Park	Kōtō
Palettetown	パレットタウン	Tokyo Cruise Ship (Palette Town, same place); Yurikamome (In front of Aomi, U-10)	Palette Town (VenusFort, Mega Web, Zepp Tokyo)	Kōtō
Tokyo-Big-Sight	東京ビッグサイト	Tokyo Cruise Ship (Tokyo Big Sight, same place); Yurikamome (3 min. walk from Tokyo Big Sight, U-11)	Tokyo Big Sight, Tokyo Fashion Town	Kōtō
Kasairinkaikouen	葛西臨海公園	JR: ■ Keiyō Line (8 min. walk from Kasairinkai-Kōen)	Kasai Rinkai Park	Edogawa
Hirai	平井		Hirai Sports Park, Great Hirai Bridge	Edogawa
Azusawa	小豆沢			Itabashi
Kamiya	神谷	Tokyo Metro: ○ Namboku Line (5 min. walk from Ōji-Kamiya, N-17)		Kita
Arakawayūen	荒川遊園	Toei: Toden Arakawa Line (7 min. walk from Arakawa-Yūenchi-mae)	Arakawa Yūen Amusement Park	Arakawa
Senju	千住	Keisei: Main Line (5 min. walk from Keisei Sekiya); Tōbu: Isesaki Line (5 min. walk from Ushida)	Great Senju Shioiri Bridge	Adachi
Sakurabashi	桜橋		Sumida Park	Taitō

== See also ==
- Tokyo Cruise Ship
- The Port Service
- Keihin Ferry Boat
- Water taxi
