= Keihin Ferry Boat =

Ship operating company in Yokohama, Japan

- Locale: Yokohama, Kanagawa, Japan
- Waterway: Port of Yokohama
- Transit type: Water bus and excursion cruise ship
- Operator: Keihin Ferry Boat
- No. of lines: 1 water bus line and 1 excursion course
- No. of vessels: 2 water buses, 4 excursion ships, 16 work ships
- No. of terminals: 2

The Keihin Ferry Boat (京浜フェリーボート, Keihin Ferī Bōto) is a ship operating company in Yokohama. Founded in 1963, the company operates water buses and an excursion cruise ship, both within the Port of Yokohama. The services include public lines listed below, as well as event cruises and chartered ships.

== Lines ==
Ships always go this direction, never the opposite.

- Ferry Boat (水上バス, Suijō Basu) (Water bus)
  - Ōsambashi — World Porters-mae — Nippon-Maru — Ōsambashi

Closes on Monday (or the next day if Monday is a holiday).

- Port of Yokohama Cruise (横浜港内クルーズ, Yokohama-kōnai Kurūzu) (Excursion cruise ship)
  - Ōsambashi — (Port of Yokohama) — Nippon-Maru — Ōsambashi

Operated on weekends and holidays.

== Stations ==
Name	Japanese	Transfers	Facilities	Location (All in Yokohama)
Ōsambashi	大さん橋	Yokohama Minatomirai Railway: ■ Minatomirai Line (8 min. walk from Nihon-ōdōri)	Ōsanbashi Pier	Naka
World Porters-mae	ワールドポーターズ前	Yokohama Minatomirai Railway: ■ Minatomirai Line (6 min. walk from Bashamichi)	Minato Mirai 21 (Yokohama Cosmo World, Yokohama World Porters)	Naka
Nippon-Maru	日本丸	JR: ■ Negishi Line (6 min. walk from Sakuragichō); Yokohama Minatomirai Railway: ■ Minatomirai Line (7 min. walk from Bashamichi, or 8 min. walk from Minato Mirai); Yokohama Municipal Subway: ■ Blue Line (6 min. walk from Sakuragichō)	Nippon-Maru Memorial Park, Minato Mirai 21 (Yokohama Landmark Tower, Queen's Square Yokohama)	Nishi

== See also ==
- The Port Service
- Tokyo Cruise Ship
- Tokyo Mizube Line
- Water taxi
