= Tokyo Cruise Ship =

Private Tokyo water bus company

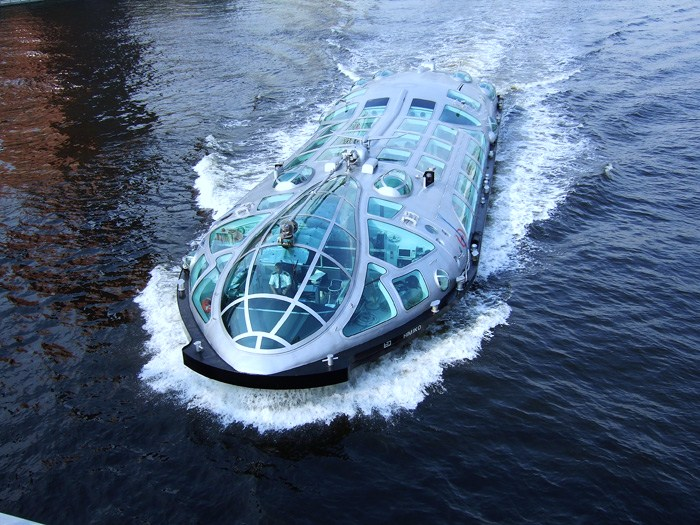
- Himiko on Sumida River
- Locale: Tokyo, Japan
- Waterway: Port of Tokyo and Sumida River
- Transit type: Water bus
- Operator: Tokyo Cruise Ship Company
- No. of lines: 6
- No. of vessels: 11 passenger ships, 1 work ship
- No. of terminals: 11

The Tokyo Cruise Ship (東京都観光汽船, Tōkyō-to Kankō Kisen; "Tokyo Metropolis Sightseeing Ship") is a water bus operator in Tokyo. It is a privately owned company operating public transport, unlike the Tokyo Metropolitan Park Association, another water bus operator in the city. It operates several public lines and offers services such as event cruises and chartered ships.

== Lines ==
Arrows (→) indicate ships only go that direction. Dashes (—) indicate ships go both directions. Lines are operated everyday, unless noted otherwise.

■ Sumida River Line (隅田川ライン, Sumidagawa Rain)

Asakusa → Hamarikyū → Hinode Pier
Hinode Pier → Asakusa

■ Asakusa-Odaiba Direct Line (浅草・お台場直通ライン, Asakusa-Odaiba Chokutsū Rain)

Asakusa → Odaiba Seaside Park → Toyosu → Asakusa

■ Happy Dog Cruise (ハッピードッグクルーズ, Happī Doggu Kurūzu)

Odaiba Seaside Park → (Cruising) → Odaiba Seaside Park

A daily event cruise for dog people.

■ Odaiba Line (お台場ライン, Odaiba Rain)

Hinode Pier — Harumi — Odaiba Seaside Park

■ Tokyo Big Sight Palette Town Line (東京ビッグサイト・パレットタウンライン, Tōkyō Biggu Saito Paretto Taun Rain)

Hinode Pier — Tokyo Big Sight — Palette Town

Closes on Monday and Tuesday.

■ Museum of Maritime Science, Shinagawa Aquarium Line (船の科学館・しながわ水族館ライン, Fune no Kagakukan Shinagawa Suizokukan Rain)

Hinode Pier — Museum of Maritime Science — Ooi Seashore Park — Shinagawa Aquarium

Closes when Shinagawa Aquarium closes (basically on Tuesday). The line is called "Canal Cruise" (キャナルクルーズ, Kyanaru Kurūzu) inside ships.

== Ships ==
- Dōkan (道灌)
- Emeraldas(ship) (エメラルダス)

Second sister ship to Himiko

- Himiko (ヒミコ)

The design produced by Leiji Matsumoto, world-famous anime and manga artist.

- Hotaluna (ホタルナ)

Sister ship to Himiko

- Jubilee (ジュビリー, Jubirī)
- Kaisyū (海舟, Kaishū)
- Our Town (アワータウン, Awā Taun)
- River Town (リバータウン, Ribā Taun)
- Ryōma (竜馬)
- Sion (潮音, Shion)
- Sumida-I (Sumida-Wan)

A rescue work ship.

- Super City (スーパーシティー, Sūpā Shitī)
- Your Town (ユアータウン, Yuā Taun)
- You (遊, Yū)

Used for the Happy Dog Cruise. The only paddlewheeler in Tokyo Bay.

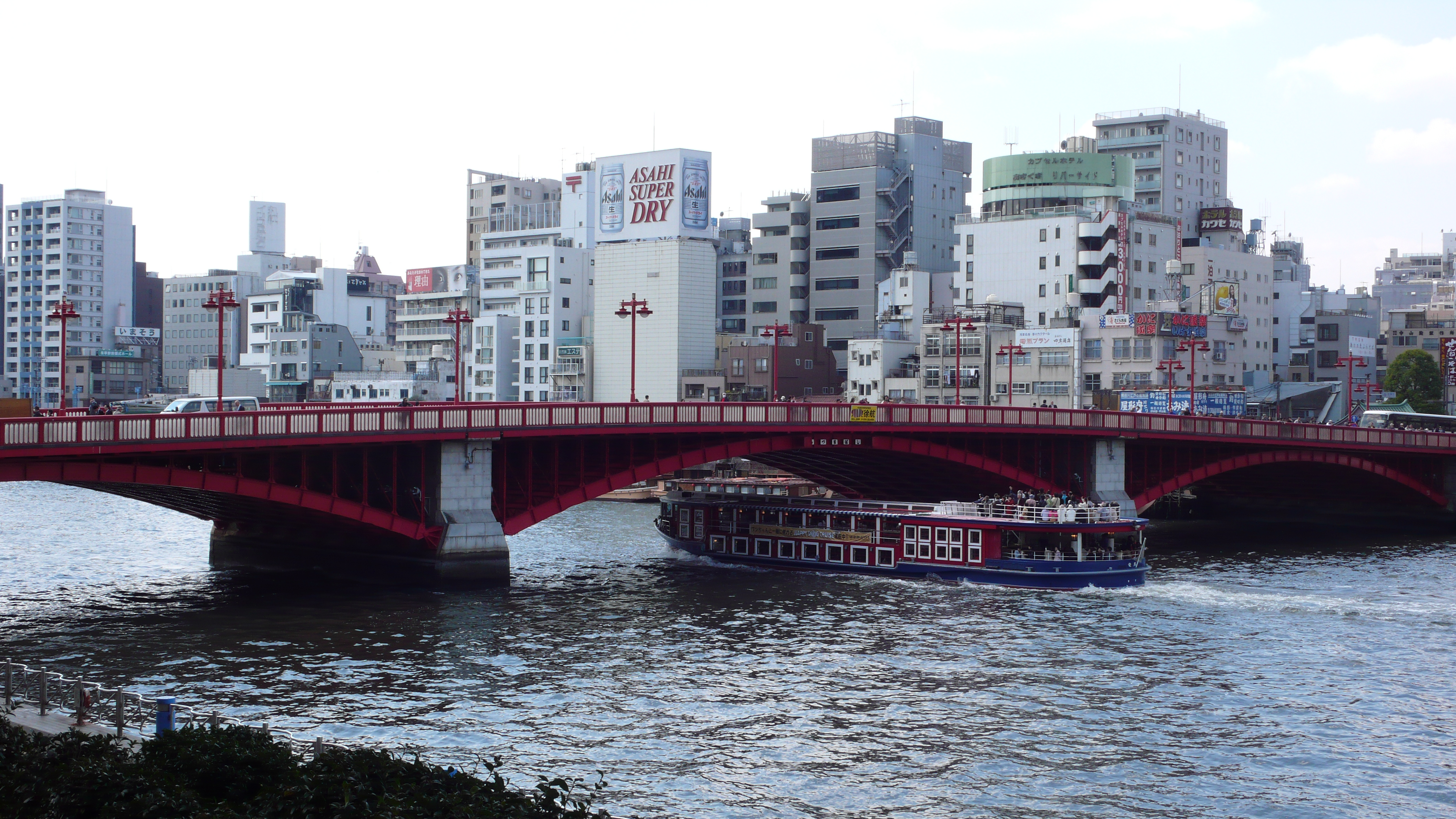
Ryōma

== Stations ==
Name	Japanese	Transfers	Facilities	Location
Hinode Pier	日の出桟橋	JR: ■ Keihin-Tōhoku Line and ■ Yamanote Line (Both 9 min. walk from Hamamatsuchō); Tokyo Monorail (9 min. walk from Hamamatsuchō); Yurikamome (2 min. walk from Hinode, U-04)	Hinode Pier	Minato
Asakusa	浅草	Tōbu: Skytree Line (1 min. walk from Asakusa); Toei: ○ Asakusa Line (3 min. walk from Asakusa, A-18); Tokyo Metro: ○ Ginza Line (1 min. walk from Asakusa, G-19)	Asakusa (Sensō-ji Temple), Kappabashi, Asahi Breweries	Taitō
Hamarikyū	浜離宮	JR: ■ Keihin-Tōhoku Line, ■ Tōkaidō Main Line, ■ Yamanote Line, and ■ Yokosuka Line (All 10 min. walk from Shimbashi); Toei: ○ Asakusa Line (10min. walk from Shimbashi, A-10), ○ Ōedo Line (5 min. walk from Shiodome, E-19, or 7 min. walk from Tsukiji-Shijō, E-18); Tokyo Metro: ○ Ginza Line (10 min. walk from Shimbashi, G-08); Tokyo Mizube Line (Hama-rikyū, same place); Yurikamome (5 min. walk from Shiodome, U-02)	Hamarikyū Gardens, Tsukiji fish market, Shiodome	Chūō
Toyosu	豊洲	Tokyo Metro: ○ Yūrakuchō Line (5 min. walk from Toyosu, Y-22); Yurikamome (5 min. walk from Toyosu, U-16)	Urban Dock LaLaPort Toyosu, Tokyo Gas Science Museum, Toyosu Park	Kōtō
Harumi	晴海		Harumi Ferry Terminal	Chūō
Odaiba Seaside Park	お台場海浜公園	Tokyo Mizube Line (Odaiba-kaihinkōen, same place); Yurikamome (5 min. walk from Daiba, U-07)	Odaiba Kaihin Park, Aqua City Odaiba, Decks Tokyo Beach, Fuji Television	Minato
Museum of Maritime Science	船の科学館	Tokyo Mizube Line (Fune-no-Kagakukan, same place); Yurikamome (5 min. walk from Tokyo International Cruise Terminal, U-08)	Museum of Maritime Science, Shiokaze Park	Kōtō
Palette Town	パレットタウン	Tokyo Mizube Line (Palettetown, same place); Yurikamome (In front of Aomi, U-10)	Palette Town (VenusFort, Megaweb, Zepp Tokyo)	Kōtō
Tokyo Big Sight	東京ビッグサイト	Tokyo Mizube Line (Tokyo-Big-Site, same place); Yurikamome (3 min. walk from Tokyo Big Sight, U-11)	Tokyo Big Sight, Tokyo Fashion Town	Kōtō
Oi Seashore Park	大井海浜公園	Tokyo Monorail (5min. walk from Ōi Keibajō Mae)	Ōi Futō Chūō Kaihin Park	Shinagawa
Shinagawa Aquarium	しながわ水族館	Keikyū: Main Line (7 min. walk from Ōmori-Kaigan)	Shinagawa Aquarium, Ōi Racecourse	Shinagawa

== See also ==
- Tokyo Mizube Line
- The Port Service
- Keihin Ferry Boat
- Water taxi
