= Alapuzha Water Taxi =

History

India
- Name: Thejus 1 (Nirva Series)
- Owner: Kerala State Water Transport Department
- Operator: Kerala State Water Transport Department
- Port of registry: Kodungallur
- Route: Alapuzha
- Builder: Navgathi Marine, Kochi, India
- Cost: ₹70 Lakhs
- Yard number: Y-20
- Launched: 25 September 2020
- Completed: September 2020
- In service: 15 October 2020
- Status: In service

General characteristics
- Class & type: Indian Register of Shipping IRS +IW ZONE 3
- Type: Catamaran
- Displacement: 6 tonnes
- Length: 8.5 m
- Beam: 3.81 m
- Height: 3.2 m
- Draft: 0.5 m
- Depth: 1.2 m
- Decks: Single
- Propulsion: 1 × 175 hp Diesel OBM
- Speed: 16 knots (30 km/h; 18 mph) (max); 12 knots (22 km/h; 14 mph) (cruising)
- Capacity: 10 passengers
- Crew: 2
- Notes: 1 kW Solar panels, ECN 3600 Electric Steering (Navgathi)

The first water taxi service in India began operations in Alapuzha from 15th October, 2020. The service was inaugurated by Sri. Pinarayi Vijayan, Chief Minister of Kerala in the presence of Sri. A.K. Saseendran, Transport Minister of Kerala, and various other dignitaries. The boat is named Thejus 1 and is the first boat under Nirva Series built by Navgathi.

Earlier, multiples states had announced plans for water taxis - Goa (2019), Delhi (2019), Mumbai (2019), Assam (2018) and West Bengal (2017).However, at the time of inauguration of Alapuzha Water Taxi service in Kerala, none of the above planned service had commenced operations.

== Service ==
The water taxi service is available as on-demand to any person around Vembanad lake in Alapuzha and Kottayam districts.
