= The Port Service =

Japanese ferry company

The Port Service Corp. / Yokohama Cruising
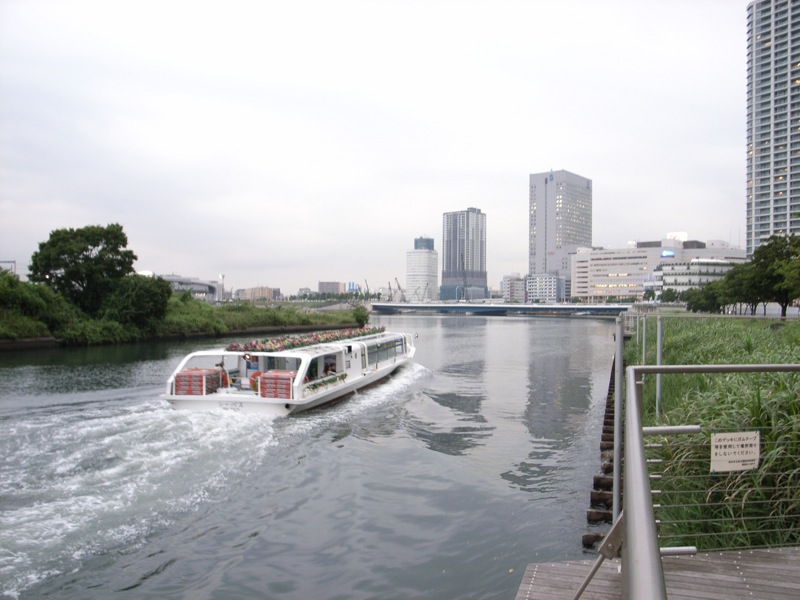
- Sea Bass at Port Side Park.
- Locale: Yokohama, Kanagawa, Japan
- Waterway: Port of Yokohama
- Transit type: Scheduled passenger ferry service and local excursion cruise ships
- Operator: The Port Service Corp.
- No. of lines: 1 water bus line, 3 excursion courses, 3 restaurant cruise courses
- No. of terminals: 4

The Port Service Corporation (ポートサービス, Pōto Sābisu) is a passenger ship operating company in Yokohama.

Founded in 1953, the company operates seabuses, an excursion cruise ship, and a restaurant ship, all within the Port of Yokohama. The services include public lines listed below, as well as chartered ships.

== Lines ==
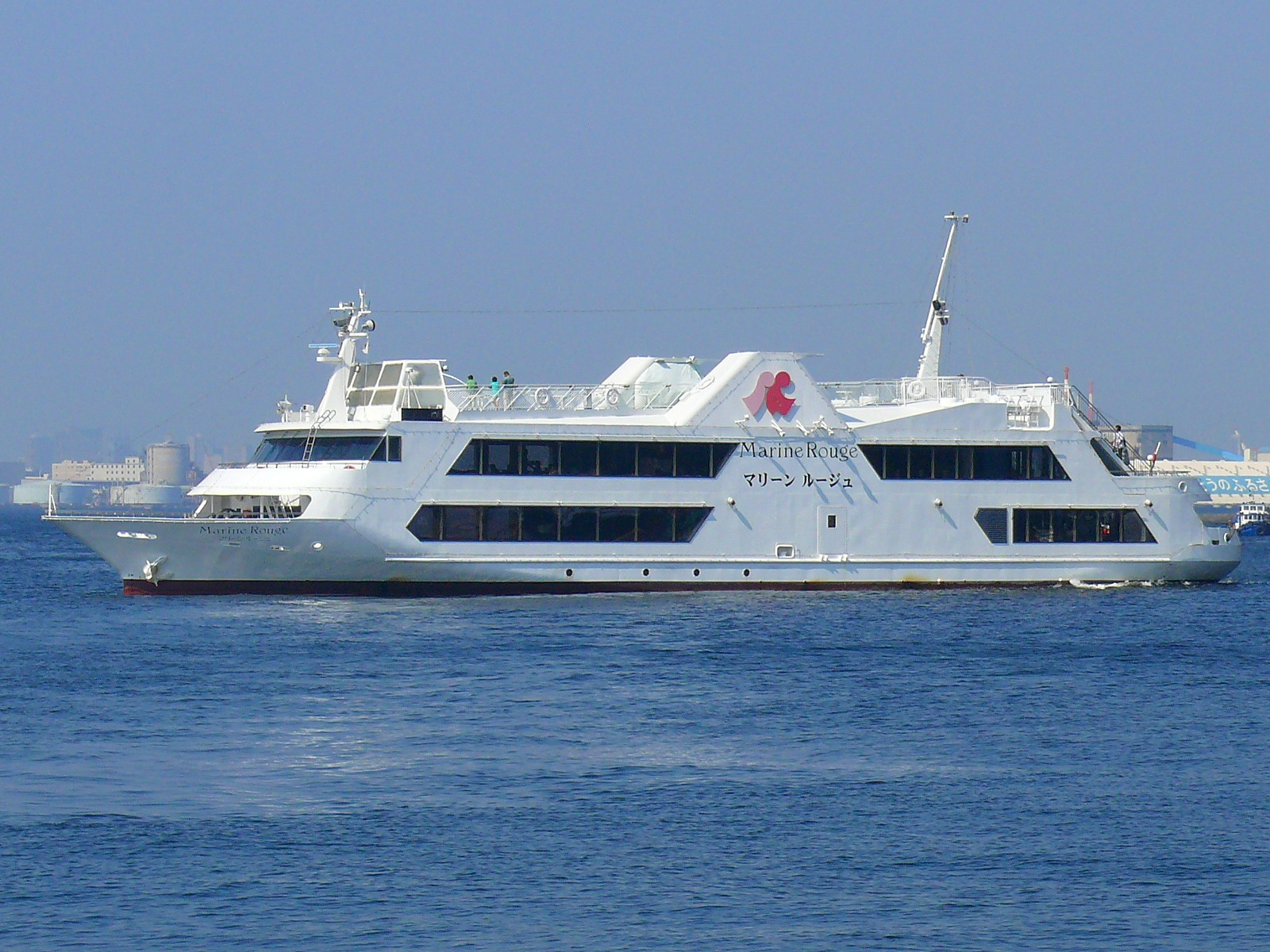
Marine Rouge, restaurant and harbour cruise ship

Arrows (→) indicate ships only go that direction. Dashes (—) indicate ships go both directions. Lines are operated every day.

Yo: Yokohama Station East Exit
M: Minato Mirai 21 Pukarisanbashi Pier
PA: Pier Aka-Renga
Ya: Yamashita Park

- Seabass (シーバス, Shībasu) (Seabus)
  - Yo — M — PA — Ya
  - Yo — Ya
- Marine Shuttle (マリーンシャトル, Marīn Shatoru) (Excursion cruise ship)
  - Ya → (Port of Yokohama) → Ya
  - Ya → PA → (Port of Yokohama) → Ya → PA
  - Ya → M → PA → (Port of Yokohama) → Ya → M → PA

There are 40 minutes, 60 minutes, and 90 minutes courses.

- Marine Rouge (マリーンルージュ, Marīn Rūju) (Restaurant ship)
  - Ya → M → PA → (Port of Yokohama) → Ya → M → PA

There are 3 courses, namely Lunch Cruising (takes 90 minutes), Sunset Cruising (90 minutes), and Dinner Cruising (120 minutes).

== Ships ==
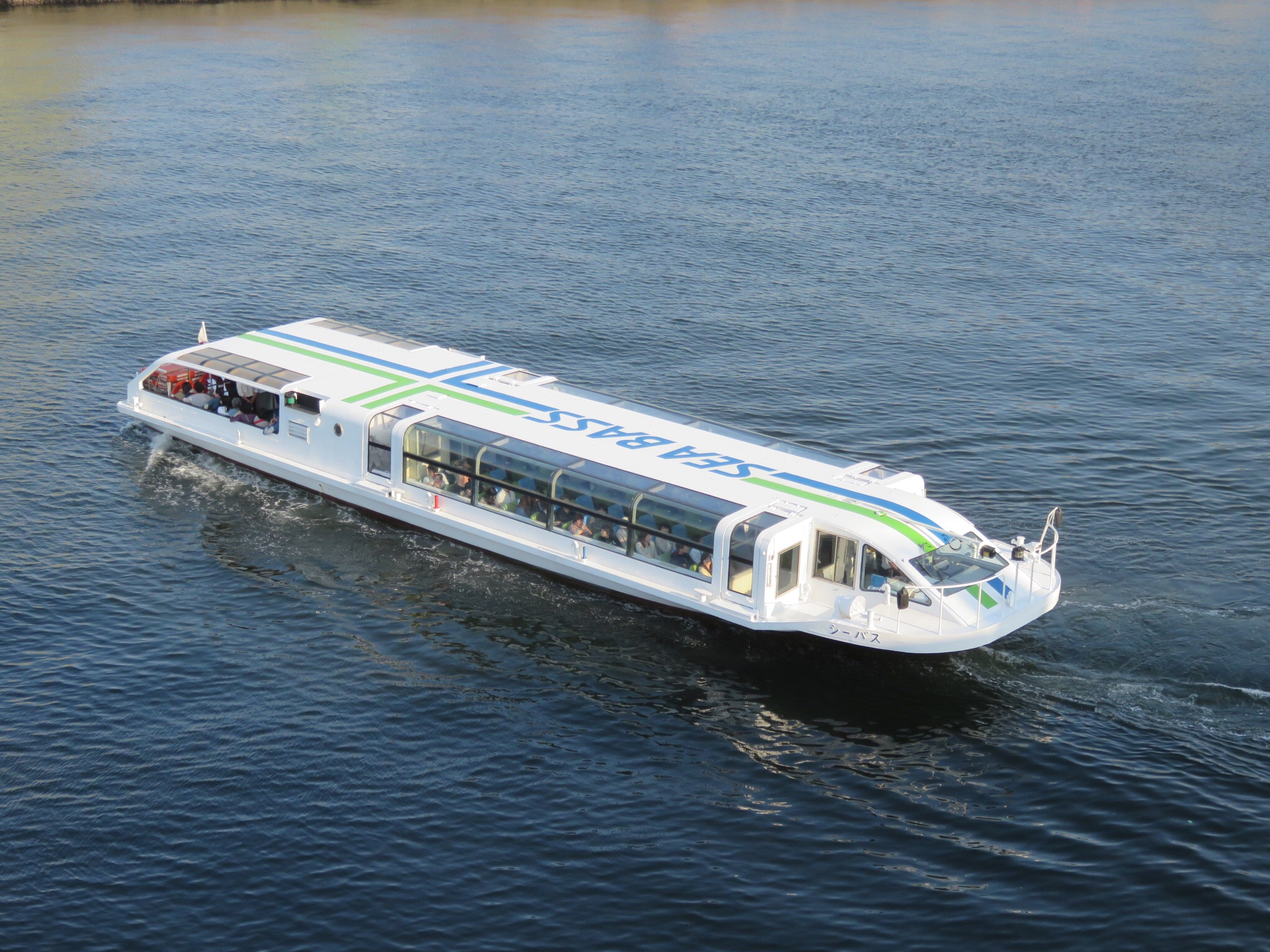
Sea Bass, shuttle passenger boat service

- Sea Bass
  - Designed for frequent passenger services between Yokohama Station and Yamashita Park. The ship is named Sea Bass, after the Japanese sea bass a fish native to local rivers and estuaries.
- Marine Shuttle
  - An excursion cruise ship, mainly built for the observation tour of the Port of Yokohama. The ship is also often used for school excursions. There is a casual restaurant as well.
- Marine Rouge
  - A restaurant ship, meaning a cruise ship mainly made for its restaurant cruise service. There are four dining spaces, and some observatory spaces. It is also possible to ride the ship without eating.

== Stations ==
Name	Japanese	Transfers	Facilities	Location (All in Yokohama)
Yokohama Station East Exit	横浜駅東口	JR: ■ Keihin-Tōhoku Line, ■ Negishi Line, ■ Shōnan-Shinjuku Line, ■ Tōkaidō Main Line, ■ Yokohama Line, ■ Yokosuka Line; Keikyū: Main Line; Sōtetsu: Main Line; Tōkyū: ■ Tōyoko Line; Yokohama Minatomirai Railway: ■ Minatomirai Line; Yokohama Municipal Subway: ■ Blue Line (All 10 min. walk from Yokohama. Minatomirai Line is also changeable at Shin-Takashima, 7 minutes walk.)	Yokohama Bayquarter, Port Side Park, Yokohama city central	Kanagawa
Minato Mirai 21 Pukarisanbashi Pier	みなとみらい21 ぷかりさん橋	Yokohama Minatomirai Railway: ■ Minatomirai Line (7 min. walk from Minato Mirai)	Minato Mirai 21 (Yokohama Landmark Tower, Pacifico Yokohama, Queen's Square Yokohama, Yokohama Cosmo World)	Nishi
Pier Aka-Renga	ピア赤レンガ (赤レンガ倉庫前)	Yokohama Minatomirai Railway: ■ Minatomirai Line (9 min. walk from Nihon-ōdōri)	Yokohama Red Brick Warehouse, Yokohama Customs, Kanagawa Prefectural Government	Naka
Yamashita Park	山下公園	Yokohama Minatomirai Railway: ■ Minatomirai Line (6 min. walk from Motomachi-Chūkagai)	Yamashita Park, Yokohama Chinatown, Yokohama Marine Tower	Naka

== See also ==
- Keihin Ferry Boat
- Tokyo Cruise Ship
- Tokyo Mizube Line
- Water taxi
