= Boat service =

Regularly scheduled transport using boats

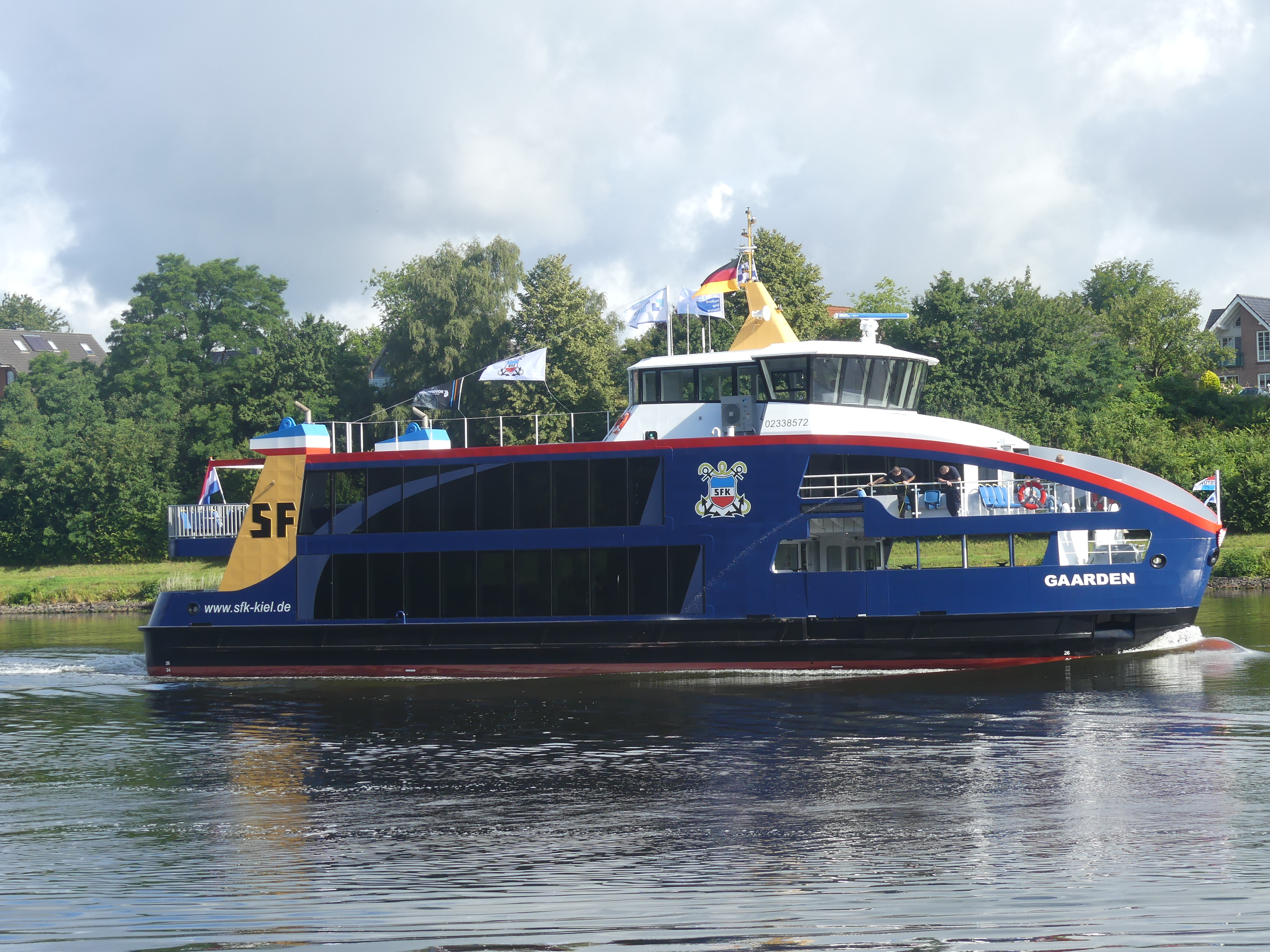
Passenger ship Gaarden in the Kiel Canal in Königsförde.

A boat service is regularly scheduled transport using one or more boats, typically on a river, at a set charge, normally depending on the length of the trip and the type of passenger. The service may only be available for foot passengers.

== Examples ==
- London, England: there is a boat service between Tate Britain and Tate Modern on the River Thames. London River Services (part of Transport for London) also provide a network of boat services on the Thames, for use by tourists and commuters.
- Scotland: Caledonian MacBrayne ferry company operates a network of boat services to 22 of Scotland's islands.
- Sydney, Australia: the Sydney Ferries provide an extensive network of boat services around Sydney Harbour and surrounding areas.
- Bangkok, Thailand: the Chao Phraya Express Boat serves piers along the Chao Phraya River, and the Khlong Saen Saep Express Boat provides motor boat services along the city's canals.
- Mahart in Budapest, Hungary

== See also ==
- RORO
- Ferry
- Special Boat Service
