= Olympic Mass =

Catholic service in the Olympic host city

The Olympic Mass or Holy Mass for the Opening of the Olympic Truce is a tradition since 1896 in connection with the Olympic Games, during which the Olympic Truce is officially inaugurated by the celebration of a Catholic Mass in the city hosting the incumbent Olympic Games.

== Background ==
Since Antiquity, sports and religion were tightly connected. In fact, "the majority of Greek athletic competitions took place in the context of religious festivals, and the religious tone of the major games cannot be denied." The Olympic Truce was inaugurated by a religions celebration. When Pierre de Coubertin, who was a devout Catholic, intended to bring this spiritual dimension to the modern Olympic Games. While the official opening ceremony of the Olympic Games includes processions and fireworks, it is also an Olympic tradition that a Catholic Mass be celebrated in order to inaugurate the Olympic truce.

== History ==
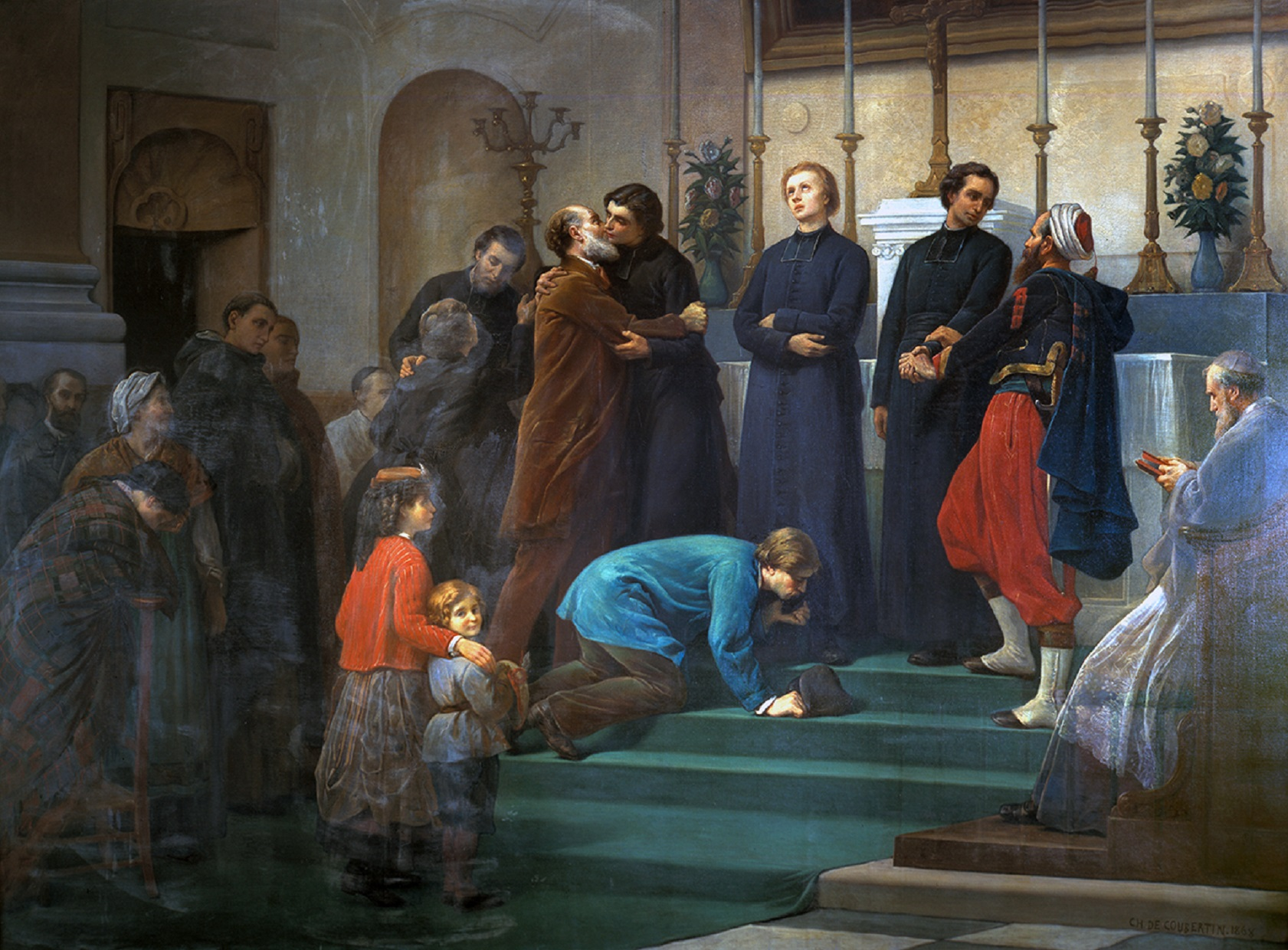
Pierre de Coubertin, founder of the modern Olympic Games, is depicted by his father Charles de Coubertin as a child attending the Departure Mass of young missionaries from the Paris Foreign Missions Society. In the background, Father Didon is seen wearing the Dominican habit.

Since the first edition of the modern Olympic Games in 1896, in Athens, a Catholic mass has been celebrated before the sporting event. Pierre de Coubertin, who renovated the Olympic Games in the modern form that we know and was a member of a very practicing Catholic family, was the instigator of this tradition. It was the Dominican Henri Didon, to whom we owe the Olympic motto "Citius, Altius, Fortis" (Faster, higher, stronger), who led the events during the 1896 mass.

Since Pope Pius XII's message in 1956 for the Melbourne Olympics, the various Popes have sent official messages to all the participants on the occasion of the Olympic games. The Pope insists on the harmony of the relationship between Christian principles and sporting activities and that it was up to the athletes, during the Olympics, to demonstrate in their actions that, without losing any of its technical value, sport, a school of energy of self-control, should be ordered to the intellectual and moral perfection of the soul. It is customary for this pontifical message to be proclaimed during the Olympic Mass.

According to Cardinal Mercier, this interest of the Catholic Church for the Olympic Games can be traced back to the letters of Saint Paul:

Anyone who has read the letters of Saint Paul, the most vigorous artisan of our Christian civilization, cannot fail to be struck by the benevolent attention he pays to the games of Greece, to racing, to wrestling, to pugilism.

== Occurrences ==
=== Athens 1896 ===
The first Olympic Mass was celebrated in Greece at the Cathedral Basilica of St. Dionysius the Areopagite by Father Didon who in his sermon celebrated the "fraternity of peoples which tends towards the moral unity which Jesus formulated". Father Didon also expressed his gratitude to the Greek authorities, considering the Games as a development of the physical force of which Greece was the mother.

=== Paris 1900 ===
Father Didon died weeks before the opening of the 1900 Paris Olympics. In his honor, the olympic delegation organized a pilgrimage to the Saint Albert the Great high school where the Dominican had taught and shared his vision for sports and peace.

=== London 1908 ===
The inaugural Mass at the London Games in 1908 was an ecumenical service presided over by Ethelbert Talbot, American Episcopal bishop of Pennsylvania, who gave the homily and used the motto of Father Henri Didon before it became the official Olympic motto some years later.

=== Anvers 1920 ===
After the First World War, the games were held in Belgium. No mass, no priestly intervention at the altar: the De Profundis, a hymn of remembrance in memory of those who had died in the previous four years, and the Te Deum, a hymn of success and hope; – secular hymns according to de Coubertin – lending themselves to beautiful musical interpretations. Cardinal Mercier gave the homily.

=== Paris 1924 ===
Pierre de Coubertin had strongly desired to celebrate the Olympic Mass once again in Paris. After much lobbying, the Games and their inaugural Mass returned to Paris in 1924.

=== Berlin 1936 ===
During the 1936 Games in Berlin, many, as Catholic theologian Yves Congar, were shocked by the display of a ceremonial backdrop to this event which was a massive classical edifice, called the Altar of Pergamon, which was in fact a pagan temple, that Bismarck had brought to Berlin from Pergamon in modern Turkey after the Franco-Prussian War in the 1870s. It was seen as blasphemous as Pergamon is spoken of in the Book of Revelation (2:13) as "the place where Satan is enthroned".

=== Melbourne 1956 ===
For the first time, a pontifical message signed by Pope Pius XII was sent for the Olympic Mass in Melbourne in 1956.

=== Rome 1960 ===
The Olympic Mass in 1960 was held on Saint Peter's Square at the Vatican on 21 August 1960 by Pope John XXIII with over 1,000 sportsmen and women in attendance.

=== Sydney 2000 ===
On the occasion of the 2000 Olympic Games in Sydney, the French postale service published a stamp in honor of the first preacher of the Olympic Mass, Father Didon. However, some media such as Liberation in France criticized the move, mentioning his anti-Dreyfusard inclination, his stance against antisemitism, and his strong support for the military.

=== Torino 2006 ===
On the occasion of the then upcoming 2006 Olympic Games in Torino, a mass was held in 8 December 2005 when Pope Benedict XVI blessed the flame to start the Olympic torch relay. It is the only occurrence that is related to a Winter Olympics.

=== Paris 2024 ===
For the 2024 edition, the Mass was celebrated by Laurent Ulrich, Archbishop of Paris, in the recently restored church of La Madeleine. Archbishop Celestino Migliore, Apostolic Nuncio to France, and Emmanuel Gobilliard, Bishop of Digne and Delegate of the Holy See for the Olympic and Paralympic Games attended. It was broadcast live on national television.
