= Olympic Games ceremony =

The Olympic Games ceremonies have been held at the Olympic Games since they began in the ancient Olympics, including the opening, closing, and medal ceremonies. Their purpose is to introduce and conclude the competition, award successful competitors, and often celebrate the culture and history of the host country. The ceremonies are integral to the Games and symbolize the international cooperation fostered in Olympic sporting events.

== Ancient forerunners ==
The ancient Olympics, held in Greece from c. 776 BCE to c. 393 CE, provided the first examples of Olympic ceremonies. Their victory celebrations, elements of which persist in the modern-day medal and closing ceremonies, often involved elaborate feasts, drinking, singing, and poetry recitation. The wealthier the victor, the more extravagant the celebration. Victors were presented with an olive wreath or crown, harvested from a special tree in Olympia by a boy specially selected for this purpose, using a golden sickle. The festival concluded with the victors making solemn vows and performing ritual sacrifices to the gods to whom they were beholden.

There is evidence of dramatic change in the format of the ancient Games during the nearly 12 centuries that they were celebrated. By roughly the 77th Olympiad, a standard 18-event program was established. In order to open the Games in ancient Greece, the organizers held an inauguration festival, followed by a ceremony in which the athletes took an oath of sportsmanship. The first competition, an artistic contest of trumpeters and heralds, concluded the opening festivities.

== Evolution of the ceremonies ==
The Olympic ceremonies have evolved over the centuries. The ancient Games incorporated ceremonies to mark the beginning and ending of every sporting event. There are similarities and differences between the ancient Olympic ceremonies and their modern counterparts. While the presentation of the Games has evolved with improvements in technology and the desire of the host nations to showcase their own artistic expression, the basic events of each ceremony have remained unchanged. The presentation of the opening and closing ceremonies continues to increase in scope, scale, and expense with each successive celebration of the Games, but they are still steeped in tradition.

Some elements of the modern ceremonies date back to the ancient Games from which the modern Olympics draw their ancestry; an example of this is the prominence of Greece in both the opening and closing ceremonies. During the 2004 Summer Olympics, the medal winners received a crown of olive branches—a direct reference to the ancient Games where the victor's prize was an olive wreath. The various elements of the ceremonies are mandated by the Olympic Charter and cannot be changed. The host nation is required to seek the approval of the International Olympic Committee (IOC) for proposed ceremony elements, including the artistic portions of the opening and closing ceremonies.

== Lighting of the Olympic flame ==
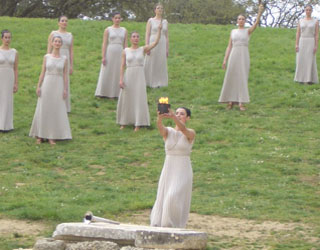
Lighting of the modern Olympic flame at Olympia, Greece, site of the ancient Games

Several months before the start of each Summer and Winter Games, the Olympic flame is kindled during a ceremony held at the Stadium at Olympia, the main site of the ancient Olympics in Olympia, Greece. An actress dressed as an ancient Greek priestess (joined by a group of women representing the Vestal Virgins) uses a parabolic mirror placed at the nearby Temple of Hera to concentrate the rays of the sun to kindle the flame. If weather prevents the use of a parabolic mirror on the day of the ceremony, a backup flame that was lit during a prior dress rehearsal is used instead. The Olympic torch relay then begins with the priestess presenting the torch and an olive branch to the first relay bearer (usually a Greek athlete who has already qualified to compete in that edition of the Games), and the flame initially travels along its route through Greece. Before it leaves the country, a handover ceremony is held in the Panathenaic Stadium in Athens, where the Hellenic Olympic Committee transfers the flame to the current year's National Olympic Committee (NOC) and local Organizing Committee (OCOG) hosts.

== Opening ==
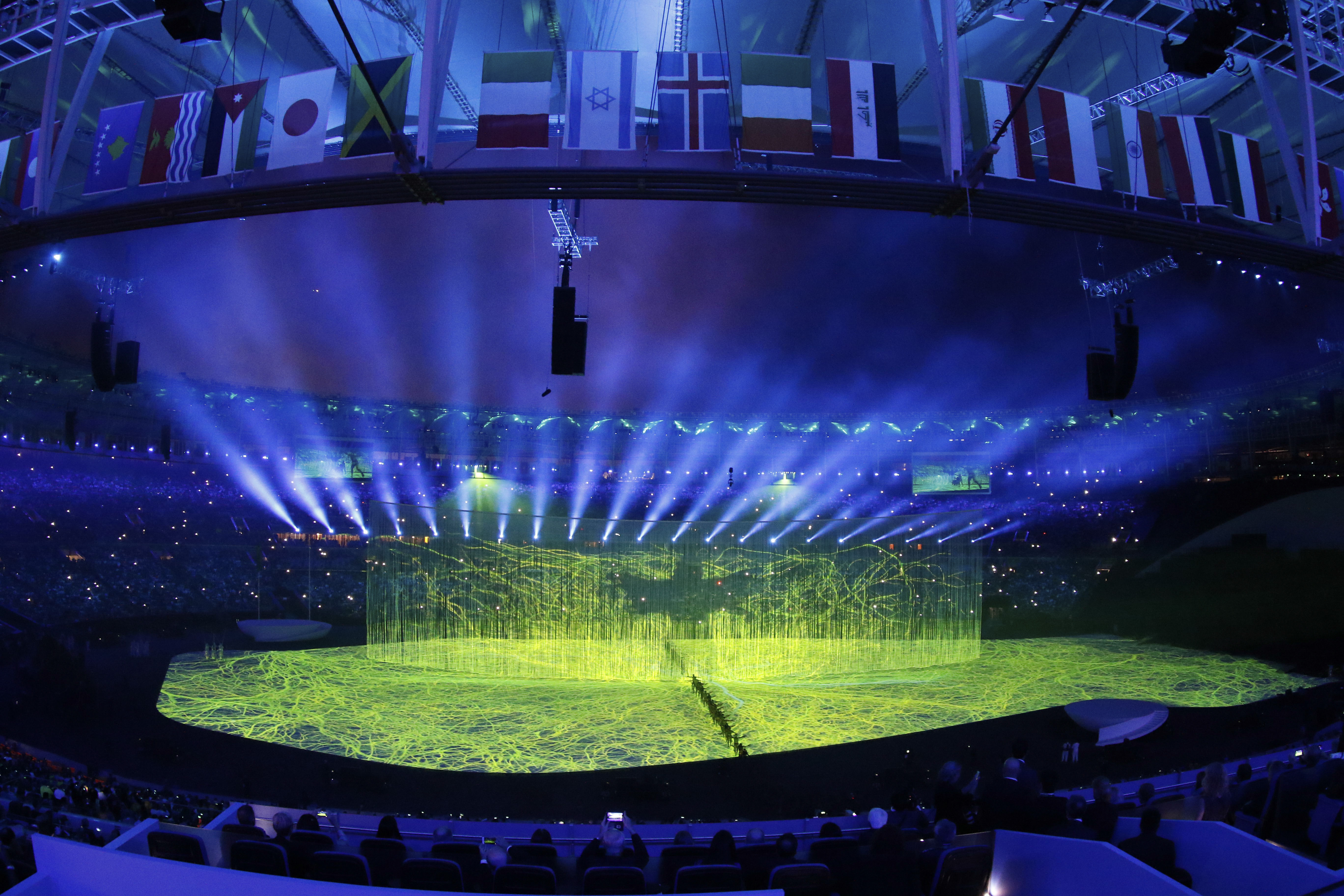
A scene from the opening ceremony of the Rio 2016 Summer Olympics

While the Olympic Mass has inaugurated the Olympic Truce since 1896 to include the religious dimension of the Olympic Games, the Olympic opening ceremony represents the official commencement of the Olympic Games and the end of the current Olympic cycle. Due to the tight schedule of the Games, some of the sporting events usually start two or three days before the opening ceremony, including the preliminary rounds in ice hockey at the Winter Games and those in football at the Summer Games.

As mandated by the Olympic Charter, various elements frame the opening ceremony of a celebration of the Olympic Games. Most of these rituals were established at the 1920 Summer Olympics in Antwerp, Belgium.

=== Tickets ===
Tickets for an opening ceremony are often the most expensive and sought-after tickets of the Games. Unsurprisingly, this norm did not hold for the 2020 Summer Olympics and the 2022 Winter Olympics because these Games were held behind closed doors due to the COVID-19 pandemic, as the 2020 Summer Olympics were held a year later in 2021. In accordance with strict pandemic protocols, the opening ceremonies took place with only invited guests attending.

=== Time of day ===
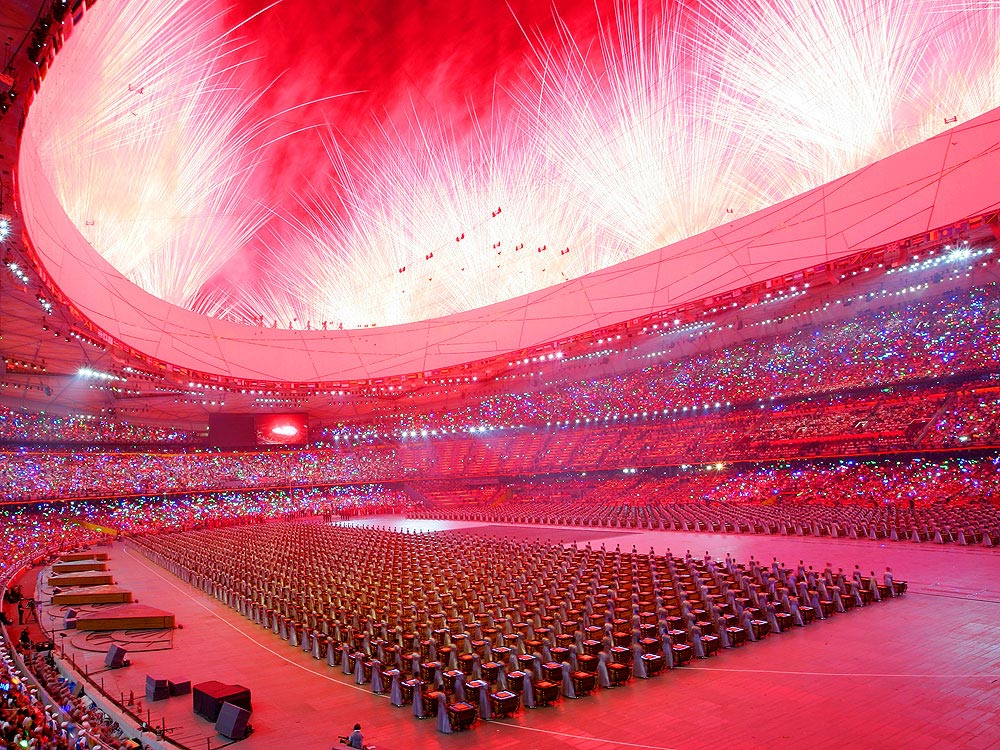
Fireworks mark the beginning of the Beijing 2008 Summer Olympics opening ceremony, hailed as one of the "greatest ever", at the culturally auspicious timing of 8:00 pm on 8 August 2008.

Since the 1996 Summer Olympics, the host committee has been required to stage the opening ceremony on a Friday evening. The 1980 Summer Olympics opening ceremony in Moscow took place at sunset, marking the first time the ceremony was held in the evening. Eight years later, to facilitate a live, prime-time broadcast on Friday night in the Americas, the 1988 Summer Olympics opening ceremony in Seoul was held in the morning, a move that faced criticism from the athletes due to the excessive heat.

The last opening ceremony to be held during daylight hours was at the 1998 Winter Olympics in Nagano, Japan. Although this ceremony had originally been planned for the evening to comply with the rule from 1996, US broadcaster CBS also demanded a live, prime-time broadcast in the Americas. Rescheduling the start time to 11:00 am local time facilitated a grand finale which, for the first time in history, featured a live and synchronized performance by six international choirs, who were linked to the venue via satellite. This finale was a performance of Beethoven's "Ode to Joy" (from his Symphony No. 9); the locations included the Sydney Opera House, the Brandenburg Gate in Berlin, and the UN General Assembly Building in New York City.

=== Artistic program ===
The artistic program provides the idiosyncratic element of the opening ceremony. Olympic founder Pierre de Coubertin's initial vision for the modern Olympics featured both athletic competitions and artistic achievements. As the modern Olympics have evolved into a celebration of sport, the opening ceremony most clearly exhibits Coubertin's overall ideal.

The host nation has the freedom to comprehensively showcase its past, present, and future through the artistic program; this serves as an international platform for the host to promote its national identity, soft power, and global image through a blend of tradition, innovation, and political symbolism. All protocols, artistic presentations, elements, and rituals included in the opening ceremony must be approved by the IOC Executive Board.

In accordance with current Olympic protocol, the opening ceremony typically begins with the entrance of the host nation's head of state (or other representative) and the president of the IOC, followed by the raising of the host nation's flag and the performance of its national anthem. The host then presents artistic displays of music, singing, dance, and theater representative of its culture, its history, and the current Olympic motto. These displays offer a unique opportunity for the host nation to promote itself among the thousands of spectators who are following the Games. Since the 1976 Winter Olympics in Innsbruck, the artistic presentations have continued to grow in scale and complexity. The 2008 Summer Olympics opening ceremony, for example, reportedly cost US$100 million, much of that cost incurred in the artistic portion of the ceremony.

The host's Organizing Committee selects the theme that is incorporated into the elements of the opening ceremony, including the artistic program. For example, the theme of the 2008 Beijing Olympics was "Unity in China". On 12 May 2008, only four months before the start of the Games, a devastating earthquake occurred in Sichuan. Chinese basketball legend Yao Ming—chosen to be China's flagbearer at the opening ceremony—entered the stadium hand-in-hand with Lin Hao, a nine-year-old boy who had rescued some of his schoolmates following the earthquake.

The 2024 artistic program stirred controversy and drew criticism from some religious groups. According to Newsweek magazine, these groups contended that the performance "appeared to reflect the Last Supper, invoking sacred Christian imagery with dancers, drag queens, and a DJ (Barbara Butch) in poses that resembled Jesus Christ's final meal with His Apostles." Theater director Thomas Jolly responded that his plan was for a "big pagan party linked to the gods of Olympus" and not to mock anyone. The show's organizers apologized to those offended by the "tableau that evoked Leonardo da Vinci's 'The Last Supper'" but defended the ideas behind it. The Olympic World Library later published a media guide (written before the ceremony), which mentioned the performance as an homage to cultural festivities; according to the Georgian fact-checking website, Myth Detector, many experts pointed out the differences between the fresco and the program segment.

=== Parade of Nations ===
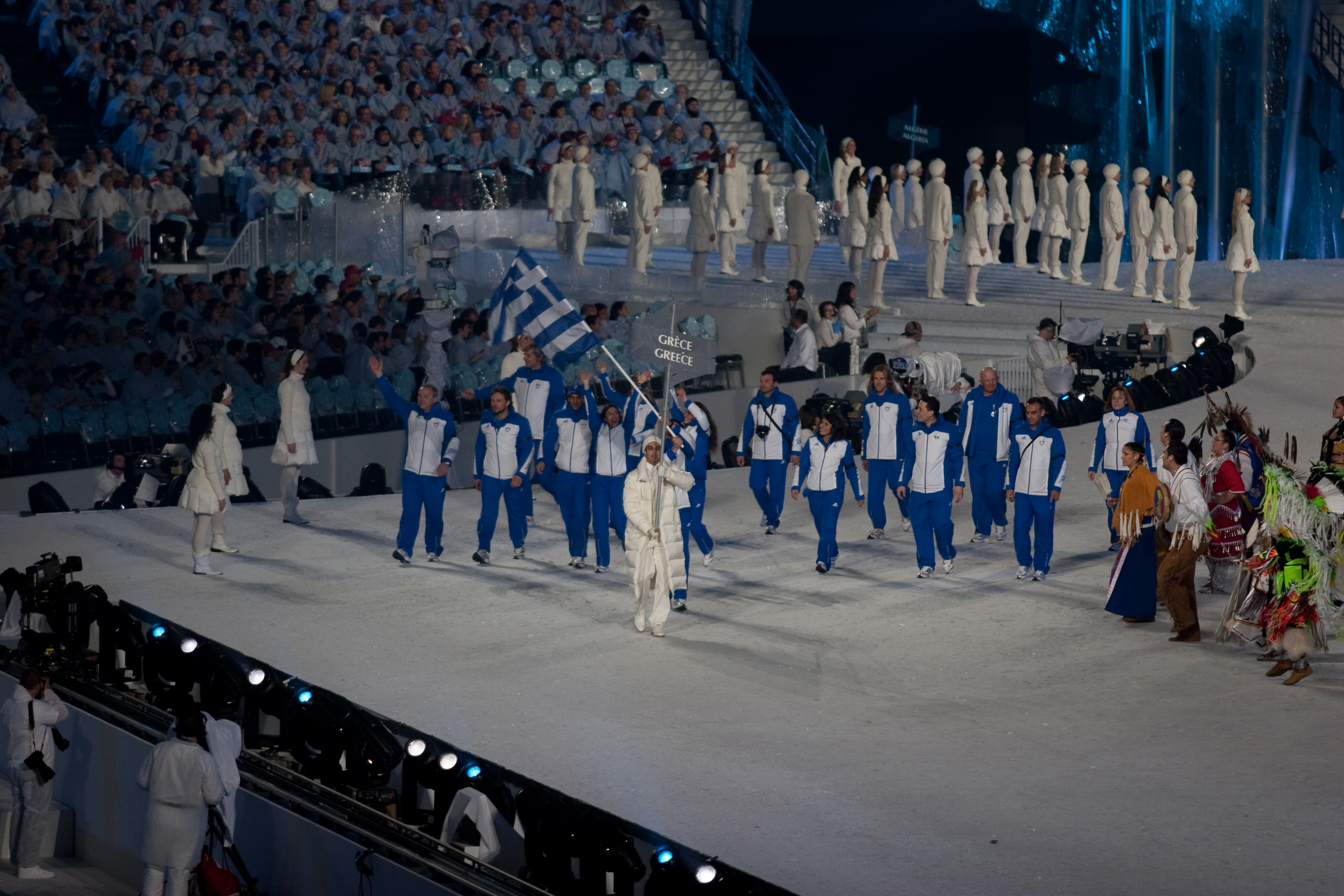
By tradition, the team from Greece leads the Parade of Nations during the opening ceremony of the Vancouver 2010 Winter Olympics.

The Olympic Charter determines that the opening ceremony must contain a protocol segment called the "Parade of Nations", during which most of the participating athletes march into the stadium, one delegation at a time. It is optional for athletes to participate in this parade. Because some Games events commonly start before the opening ceremony, any athletes competing in those early events may elect not to march with their team. Each delegation is led by a sign showing the name of its NOC and by its flagbearer(s), who are typically notable athletes from that delegation. Both men and women can be appointed to this honor, although female athletes began to consistently appear as flagbearers only from 1952 onwards; despite increasing inclusion over the years, they were outnumbered by their male counterparts (both in total and relative numbers) on all occasions until Tokyo 2020. As an act of gender equality, beginning in 2020, the IOC has allowed the participating NOCs the option of having two flagbearers, one male and one female. (Some countries had already chosen this approach before the option was initiated by the IOC.)

The Parade of Nations was added to the opening ceremonies of the Olympic Games in 1908. Since the 1928 Summer Olympics, the team from Greece has traditionally entered first, leading the parade in recognition of their role in the ancient Olympic Games; the host nation's team enters the stadium last. This practice was relaxed at the 1924, 1928, 1932, and 1960 opening ceremonies of the Winter Olympics, because Greece did not participate, as well as at the 2004 opening ceremony of the Summer Olympics, because the Games were hosted by Greece; the Greek flagbearer Pyrros Dimas led the parade by himself, followed by the Saint Lucia delegation, while the rest of the Greek team entered last. Beginning with the 2020 Olympics, the Refugee Olympic Team enters second, after Greece; the parade ends with the host nations of the next two Olympic Games in descending order, as the final two teams before the host nation. (For example, at the 2020 opening ceremony, the final three NOCs in the parade were the US, France, and Japan—hosts of the 2028, 2024, and 2020 Games, respectively.)

All of the remaining delegations enter the stadium after Greece and before the host nation, appearing in alphabetical order based on their NOC's name in the host nation's official language. For example, Cyrillic script was used at the 1980 Summer Olympics in the then-Soviet Union (now Russia), the 1984 Winter Olympics in the then-Yugoslavia (now Bosnia and Herzegovina), and the 2014 Winter Olympics in Russia, while the 2004 Summer Olympics in Athens used Modern Greek script. Games hosted by Canada have used either English or French since they are both considered official languages of the country; the 1988 and 2010 Winter Olympics in Calgary and Vancouver utilized English, but the 1976 Summer Olympics in Montreal used French because the region is predominantly French-speaking.

Host nations whose official languages do not use Latin script—especially for Games held in Asia—have employed alternative collation methods for the Parade of Nations. At the 1988 Summer Olympics and the 2018 Winter Olympics (both held in South Korea), the NOC names were sorted by traditional Korean Hangul script; the 2008 Summer Olympics and the 2022 Winter Olympics (both held in Beijing) ordered the NOC names by the number of strokes used to write the team name using simplified Chinese characters; and the 2020 Summer Olympics (held in Tokyo) used the Gojūon ordering of Japanese kana (syllabaries).

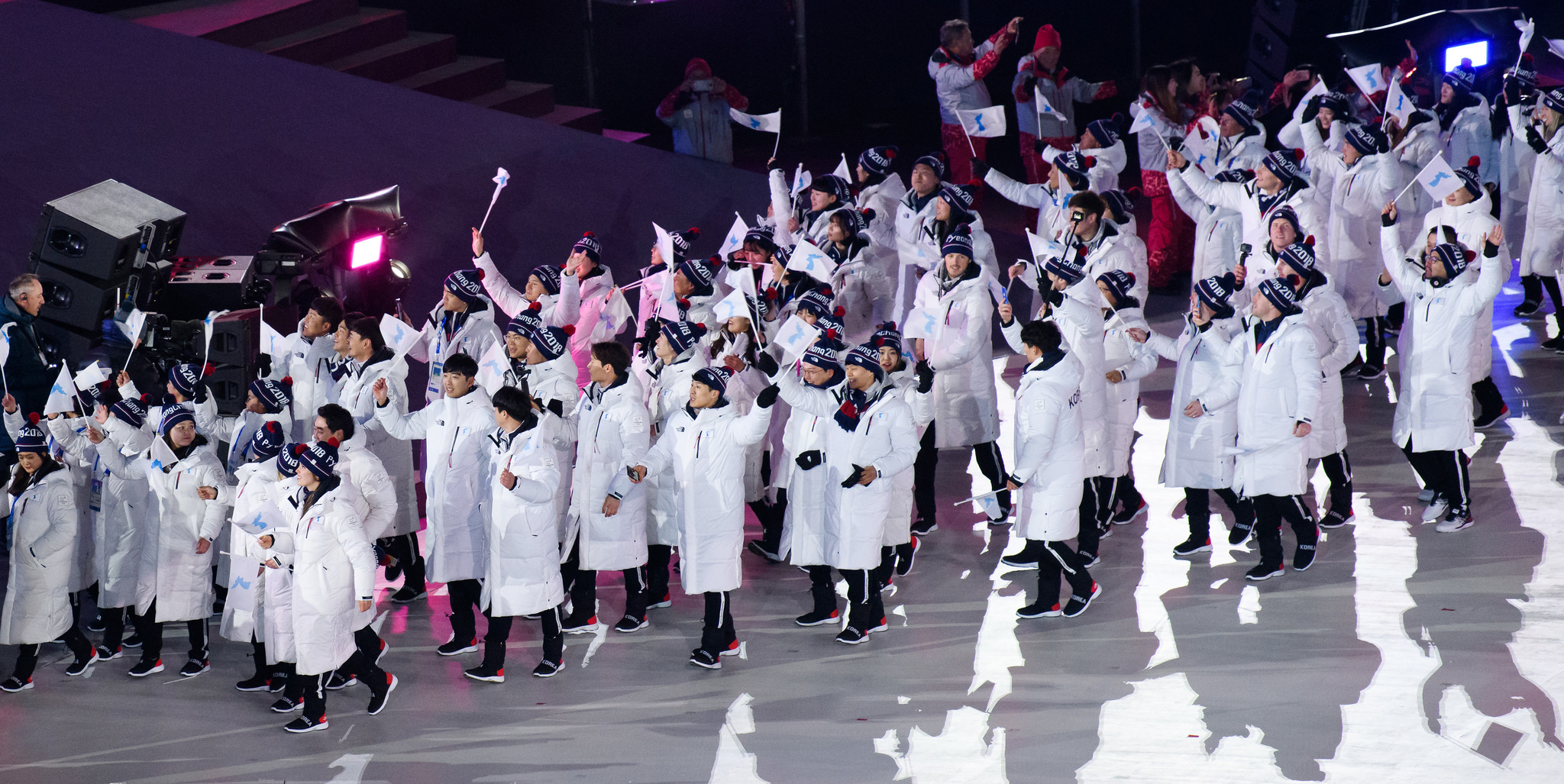
The delegations of North Korea and South Korea march together during the opening ceremony of the PyeongChang 2018 Winter Olympics, which was hosted by South Korea.

There have been a number of exceptions to this collation practice. When the Games were held in Japan in 1964 (summer), 1972 (winter), and 1998 (winter), the organizers used the English language protocol order because the use of Japanese grammar would cause certain IOC protocol rules to be broken; this use of English was considered a sign of goodwill by Japanese society. In addition, national and regional issues led Spain to make an exception during the 1992 Summer Olympics in Barcelona, with consideration for the Catalan independence movement and concerns about the Spanish language gaining undue prominence over the Catalan language; all official announcements during the 1992 Games were initially made in French, followed by Spanish, Catalan, and English (with the order of these three languages interspersed); the order of teams in the Parade of Nations was based on the French names of the delegations.

The 2024 Summer Olympics' opening ceremony eschewed a stadium setting; its parade took the form of a boat parade along the Seine River, with the artistic program staged as presentations at locations along the route. The athletes were then taken to the Jardins du Trocadéro (transl. Gardens of the Trocadéro), where the official protocol was held.

=== Opening protocols ===
By protocol, after all nations have entered the stadium, the president of the host city's Organizing Committee makes a speech, followed by remarks from the IOC president. At the conclusion of their remarks, the IOC president introduces the host country's representative or head of state to declare the Games officially open. Despite the Games being awarded to a city in particular (rather than to the country in general), the Olympic Charter requires the Games to be officially opened by the host country's head of state. However, there have been many exceptions to this rule, when someone other than the host country's head of state has opened the Games. The first example was at the 1900 Summer Olympics in Paris, which had no opening ceremony as it formed a part of the 1900 Paris Exposition. In the United States alone, there are five examples of Games that were opened by people other than the head of state.

The Olympic Charter provides that the person designated to open the Games should do so by reciting one of the following lines, as appropriate:

1. For the Summer Olympics (Games of the Olympiad): I declare open the Games of [name of the host city] celebrating the [ordinal number of the Olympiad] Olympiad of the modern era.
2. For the Winter Olympics: I declare open the [ordinal number] Olympic Winter Games of [name of the host city].

Before 1936, the opening dignitary often made a short welcoming speech before declaring the Games open. However, since 1936, when Adolf Hitler opened both the 1936 Winter Olympics in Garmisch Partenkirchen and the 1936 Summer Olympics in Berlin, the standard formula has been used.

On several occasions, an official has modified the wording of the opening line specified in the Olympic Charter. Recent editions of the Winter Games have seen a trend toward using a modification of the first version, instead of the second, which happened in 2002, 2006, and 2010. Other modifications have included the following:

- In 1964, Emperor Hirohito of Japan—and similarly Emperor Naruhito in 2020—opened the Summer Olympics in Tokyo by speaking in Japanese, albeit with slightly different translations:

"Celebrating the 18th/Commemorating the 32nd Modern Olympiad, I will declare the opening of the Olympic Games Tokyo competition here."

- In 1968, Mexican president Gustavo Díaz Ordaz declared the opening of the Games of Mexico City by speaking in Spanish:

"Today, 12 October 1968", and then the standard formula followed.

- In 1976, Elizabeth II of the United Kingdom, in her role as Queen of Canada, opened the Montreal Olympics first in French and then in English:

"I declare open the Olympic Games of 1976, celebrating the XXI Olympiad of the modern era."

- In 1980, Leonid Brezhnev, as General Secretary of the Communist Party of the Soviet Union, opened the Moscow Summer Olympics by speaking in Russian:

"Mr President of International Olympic Committee! Sportsmen of the world! Dear guests! Comrades! I declare open the Olympic Games of 1980, celebrating the XXII Olympiad of the modern era."

- In 1984, US President Ronald Reagan opened the Los Angeles Summer Olympics:

"Celebrating the XXIII Olympiad of the modern era, I declare open the Olympic Games of Los Angeles."

- In 1992, King Juan Carlos I of Spain opened the Barcelona Summer Olympics:

"[In Catalan] Welcome all to Barcelona. [In Spanish] Today, 25 July of the Year 1992", and then the standard formula followed.

- In 2002, US President George W. Bush opened the Winter Olympics in Salt Lake City (which took place five months after the September 11 attacks) using the format of the Summer Games declaration:

"On behalf of a proud, determined and grateful nation", and then the standard formula followed.

- In 2004, Konstantinos Stephanopoulos, the president of the Hellenic Republic, opened the Athens Summer Olympics, accompanied by the adjutant to the president of the Hellenic Republic, Colonel Georgios Dritsakos of the Hellenic Air Force, by speaking in Greek:

"I declare the opening of the Olympic Games of Athens [...] and the celebration of the XXVIII Olympiad of the modern era."

- In 2008, Hu Jintao, and in 2022, Xi Jinping—the general secretaries of the Chinese Communist Party and Presidents of China—opened the Beijing Summer Olympics and Winter Olympics, respectively, by speaking in Mandarin:

"I declare, the XXIX Olympic Games / XXIV Olympic Winter Games of Beijing, open!"

- In 2016, Brazilian vice president Michel Temer, as acting president during the suspension of President Dilma Rousseff (atypically with no introduction), opened the Summer Olympics in Rio de Janeiro by speaking in Portuguese:

"After this wonderful spectacle", and then the standard formula followed.

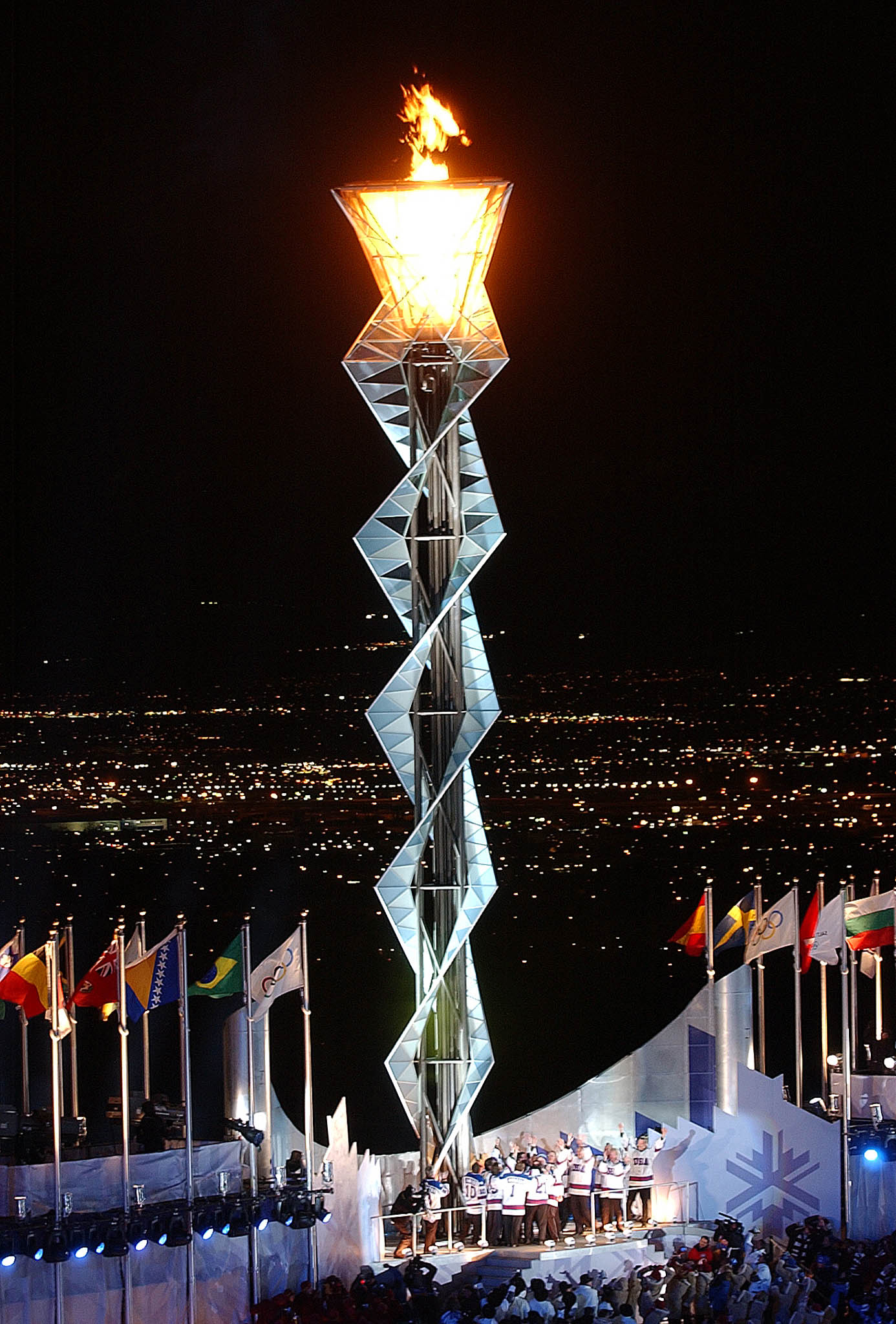
The lighting of the cauldron during the opening ceremony of the Salt Lake City 2002 Winter Olympics

Next, the Olympic flag is carried into the stadium horizontally (a protocol first adopted at the 1960 Summer Olympics) or vertically (when the ceremonies are held indoors), and this flag is then hoisted while the Olympic Hymn is played. In 2024, the flag was accidentally raised upside down. The Olympic Charter states that the Olympic flag must "fly for the entire duration of the Olympic Games from a flagpole placed in a prominent position in the main stadium". At most Games, the flag has been carried into the stadium by prominent athletes of the host nation. Following changes made during the 112th IOC Session held in 2001, consent is given for the Olympic flag to be carried during the opening ceremony by people who are not athletes, but who promote Olympic values. This special permission includes Paralympic athletes.

Until the 1988 Summer Olympics, flagbearers of all countries next circled a rostrum, where one athlete of the host nation (a protocol first adopted at the 1920 Summer Olympics) and one judge of the host nation (adopted at the 1972 Summer Olympics) spoke the Olympic Oath, declaring that they would compete and judge according to the rules of their respective sports. Since the 2012 Summer Olympics in London, continuing with a tradition started at the 2010 Summer Youth Olympics, a coach from the host nation also speaks the Olympic Oath. For the 2018 Winter Olympics in Pyeongchang, the three oaths were merged into one as the Unified Oath, with one athlete, one judge, and one coach each reciting their respective lines of the oath in turn, and the athlete then completing the oath.

=== Olympic flame ===
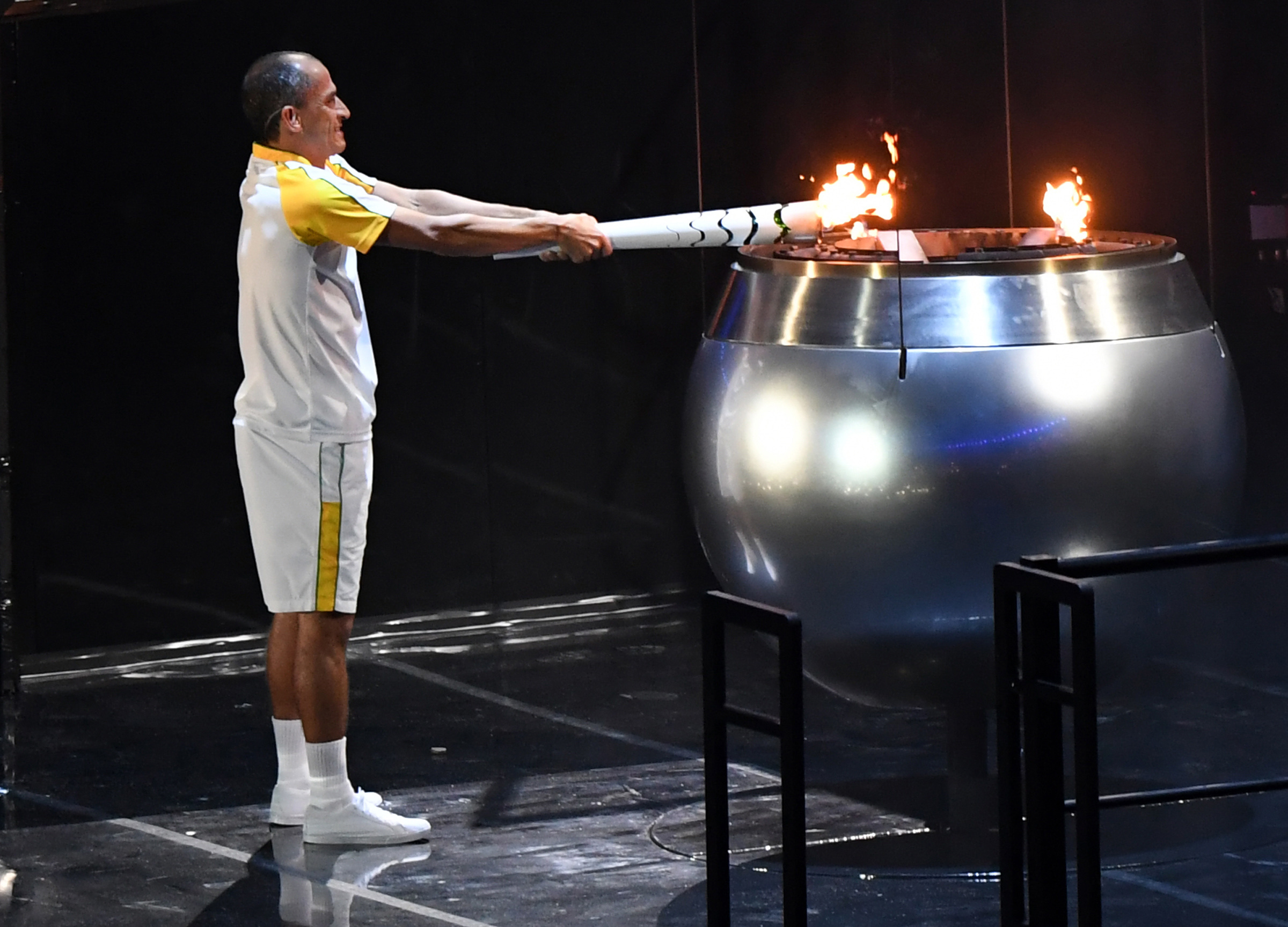
Brazilian marathoner Vanderlei de Lima lights the Olympic cauldron during the opening ceremony of the Rio 2016 Summer Olympics.

Since the 1992 Summer Olympics, the climax of the opening ceremony has been the arrival of the Olympic flame, marking the conclusion of the torch relay. The torch is usually passed between a group of final torchbearers, who are typically selected from among the host nation's most prominent Olympic athletes. The torch is then used by the final torchbearer(s) to light a cauldron inside or near the stadium, signifying the true beginning of the Games. To increase the audience's anticipation, the final torchbearer is often announced only at the last moment. On a few occasions, the final torchbearers have not been prominent sports figures: for example, in 2012, to reflect the slogan of the Olympiad ("Inspire a Generation"), the Olympic cauldron was lit by a group of seven young athletes, who had each been nominated by a notable British Olympian. The final torchbearers at the 2022 Winter Olympics reflected China's history in Olympic sports, with athletes from different decades (beginning with the 1950s), and the cauldron was lit by two Chinese skiers due to compete at the 2022 Games.

Under IOC rules, the lighting of the Olympic cauldron must be witnessed by those attending the opening ceremony, implying that it must be lit at the location where the ceremony is taking place. Another IOC rule stipulates that the cauldron should also be visible externally to residents of the entire host city. This rule was demonstrated for the first time during the 2010 Winter Olympics opening ceremony in Vancouver, which was the first to be held in a closed venue—BC Place, then a domed, indoor stadium. A ceremonial cauldron was lit jointly by Nancy Greene Raine, Steve Nash, and Wayne Gretzky during the opening ceremony (because of a malfunction, an arm of the cauldron meant to be lit by Catriona Le May Doan did not rise), after which Gretzky was escorted outside to light a second, public cauldron at Jack Poole Plaza.

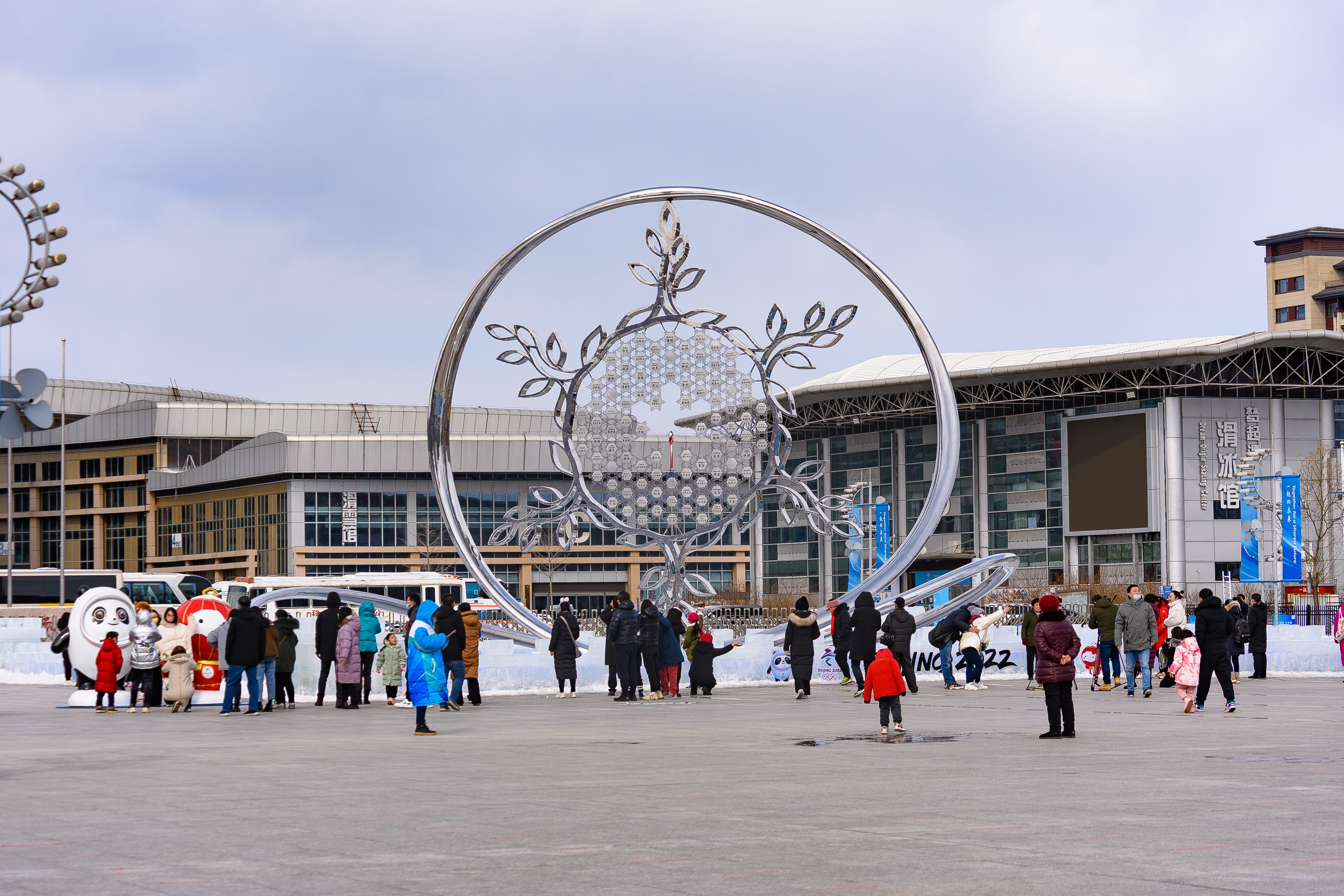
One of the three public flames of the 2022 Winter Olympics, located in Yanqing

The concept of a public cauldron has since been revisited by subsequent Olympics, including the following years:

- 2016, because the main cauldron was lit in a stadium that hosted no events during the majority of the Games
- 2020, when the cauldron was located on the bridge crossing the Ariake West Canal. The cauldron could not be placed on the roof of Japan National Stadium because of fire codes, since this roof was constructed largely from wood.
- 2024, when the cauldron was a tethered balloon at the Tuileries Garden in Paris. This cauldron was public by design due to the opening ceremonies being held outside of a stadium.

The 2022 and 2026 Winter Olympics both used multiple flames because the venues were dispersed across multiple locations. The 2022 Games had a flame at Beijing National Stadium (Olympic Green), Yanqing District, and in Zhangjiakou to reflect the three venue clusters; the 2026 Games used two cauldrons in Cortina d'Ampezzo and Milan, because these were billed as joint host cities. 2022 also marked the first Olympics not to use a cauldron; instead, the final torchbearers mounted the torch in a larger sculpture.

=== Release of doves ===
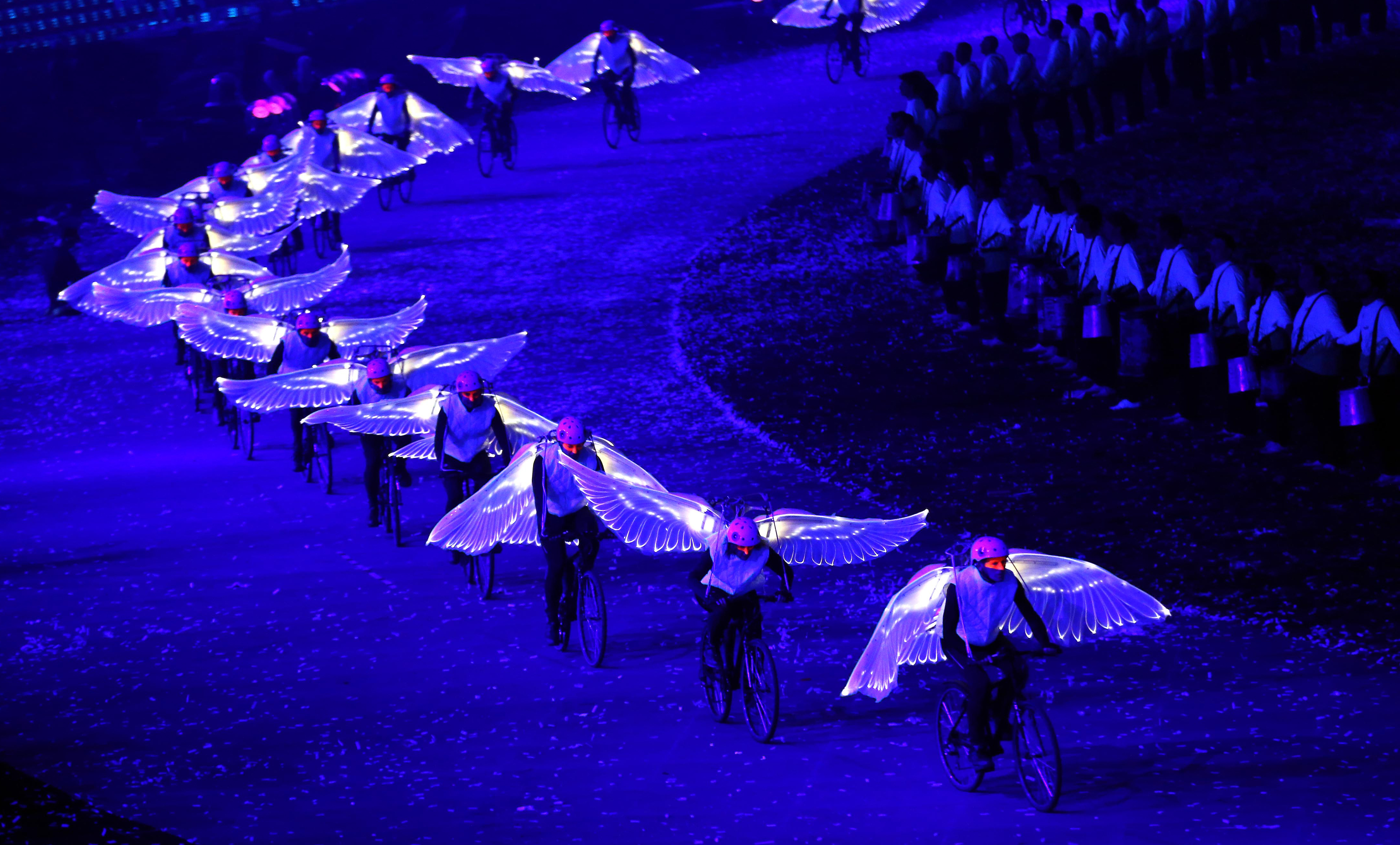
Imagery of doves (seen here at the London 2012 opening ceremony) has been featured in all Olympic opening ceremonies.

Beginning with the post-World War I Summer Olympics of 1920, the lighting of the Olympic flame was followed by the release of doves symbolizing peace. Experienced athletes brought newspapers to protect themselves from the doves' droppings. The tradition of releasing live doves was discontinued after several doves perched themselves at the cauldron's rim and were burned alive by the Olympic flame during the opening ceremony of the 1988 Summer Olympics in Seoul.

The release of live doves has since been replaced by a purely symbolic release, in which the imagery of doves is incorporated as a motif in one of the artistic segments of the ceremony:

- 1992: During a segment honoring the Summer Olympics' host cities, flagbearers representing the 1916, 1940, and 1944 Games (which were cancelled because of World War I and World War II) carried flags with an image of Pablo Picasso's lithograph Dove rather than the Olympic rings.
- 1998: Dove-shaped balloons were released.
- 2002: Dove-shaped kites were flown by figure skaters, while Sting performed the song "Fragile" alongside cellist Yo-Yo Ma.
- 2004: Doves were projected on a "globe" during a segment before the cauldron lighting that chronicled the torch relay.
- 2006: Acrobats formed the shape of a dove.
- 2008: Performers formed the shape of a flying dove on the stage floor.
- 2010: Imagery of doves was projected on the stage floor while k.d. lang performed the song "Hallelujah" by Leonard Cohen.
- 2012: Bicyclists wore LED-illuminated dove wings.
- 2014: Ballet dancers holding strands of blue LEDs danced on a dove shape that was projected on the stadium floor.
- 2016: Children with dove-shaped kites ran with the first Olympic Laurel winner, Kipchoge Keino.
- 2018: Performers lit candles to make the shape of a dove.
- 2020 (held in 2021): Performers flew doves made of rice paper.
- 2022: Children held dove lamps and lanterns, leaving trails of glittering snowflakes in their wake.
- 2024: Lights forming the shape of dove wings were lit on bridges along the Seine River and beneath the Eiffel Tower.
- 2026: Rapper Ghali recited Gianni Rodari's anti-war poem "Promemoria" while dancers formed a dove.

== Medal presentation ==
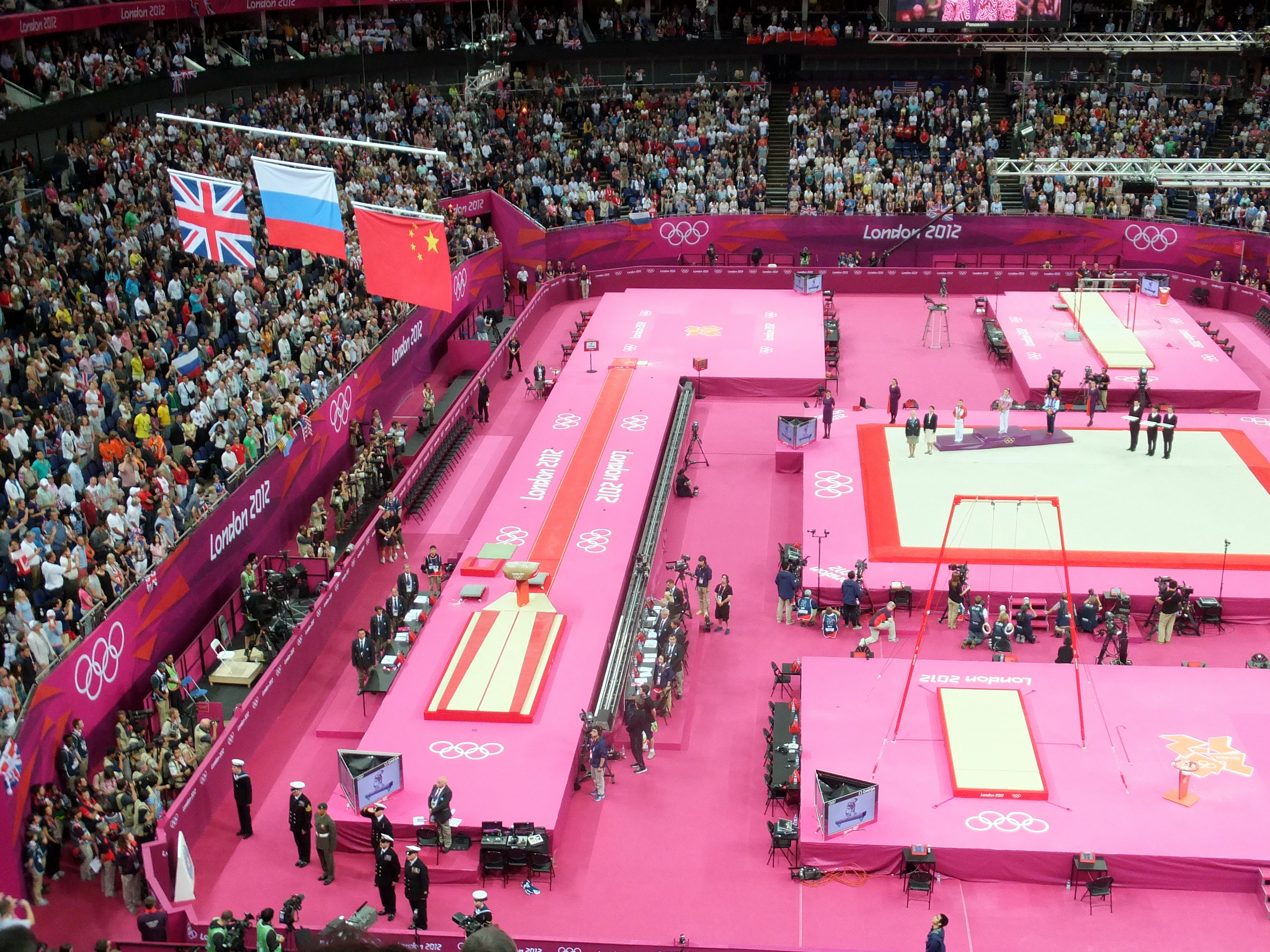
The medal ceremony for the women's uneven bars competition at the London 2012 Summer Olympics

A medal ceremony is held after the completion of every Olympic event. At the Summer Games, the ceremony usually takes place immediately after each event at the respective venues. At the Winter Games, however, the tradition is to present the medals during an evening victory ceremony held at the "medal plaza" (except for the indoor events and certain specific events). The reason for this tradition is that presenting medals may be difficult in the high-altitude environments of some winter events. A three-tiered rostrum (raised platform) is used for the three medal winners; the gold medal winner ascends to the highest platform (in the center), and the silver and bronze medalists flank the gold medalist. Medals are awarded by a member of the IOC, usually accompanied by a representative of the sport's international federation (such as World Athletics in athletics or World Aquatics in swimming), who presents each athlete with a small bouquet of flowers. Volunteer citizens of the host country participate as hosts during the medal ceremonies, acting as flagbearers and assisting the officials presenting the medals. When the Games were held in Athens in 2004, the medal winners also received olive wreaths to honor the tradition at the ancient Olympics. At the 2016 Summer Olympics, for the first time in history, the flowers were replaced by a small 3D model of the Games' logo. At the 2018 Winter Olympics, the flowers were replaced by a special version of the plush toy of the Games mascot dressed in traditional Korean clothing.

After medals have been distributed, the three medalists' national flags are raised. The flag of the gold medalist's country is in the center and raised the highest; the flag of the silver medalist's country is on the left (when viewed from the front), and the flag of the bronze medalist's country is on the right, both at lower heights than the gold medalist's national flag. While the flags are raised, the national anthem of the gold medalist's country is played. If multiple athletes tie for the gold medal (as with the two gold medalists in the men's high jump at the 2020 Games), their national anthems (if from multiple NOCs) are played in alphabetical order of the medalists' surnames.

Strict rules govern the conduct of athletes during the medal ceremony. For example, athletes are required to wear only pre-approved outfits that are standard for the athlete's national Olympic team. Athletes are not permitted to display any political affiliation or make any political statement while on the medal stand. The most famous violation of this rule was the Black Power salute of Tommie Smith and John Carlos at the 1968 Summer Olympics in Mexico City. For their actions, IOC president Avery Brundage demanded their expulsion from the Olympics. After the US Olympic Committee (USOC) refused, Brundage threatened to remove the entire US track and field team from the Olympics; the USOC then complied, expelling Smith and Carlos from the Olympic Village.

By custom, two sets of medals—the men's and women's marathon medals (Summer Olympics, since 2020) and the men's 50 km and women's 30 km cross-country skiing medals (Winter Olympics, since 2014)—are awarded as part of the closing ceremony in the Olympic Stadium, traditionally the last medal presentation of the Games.

== Closing ==
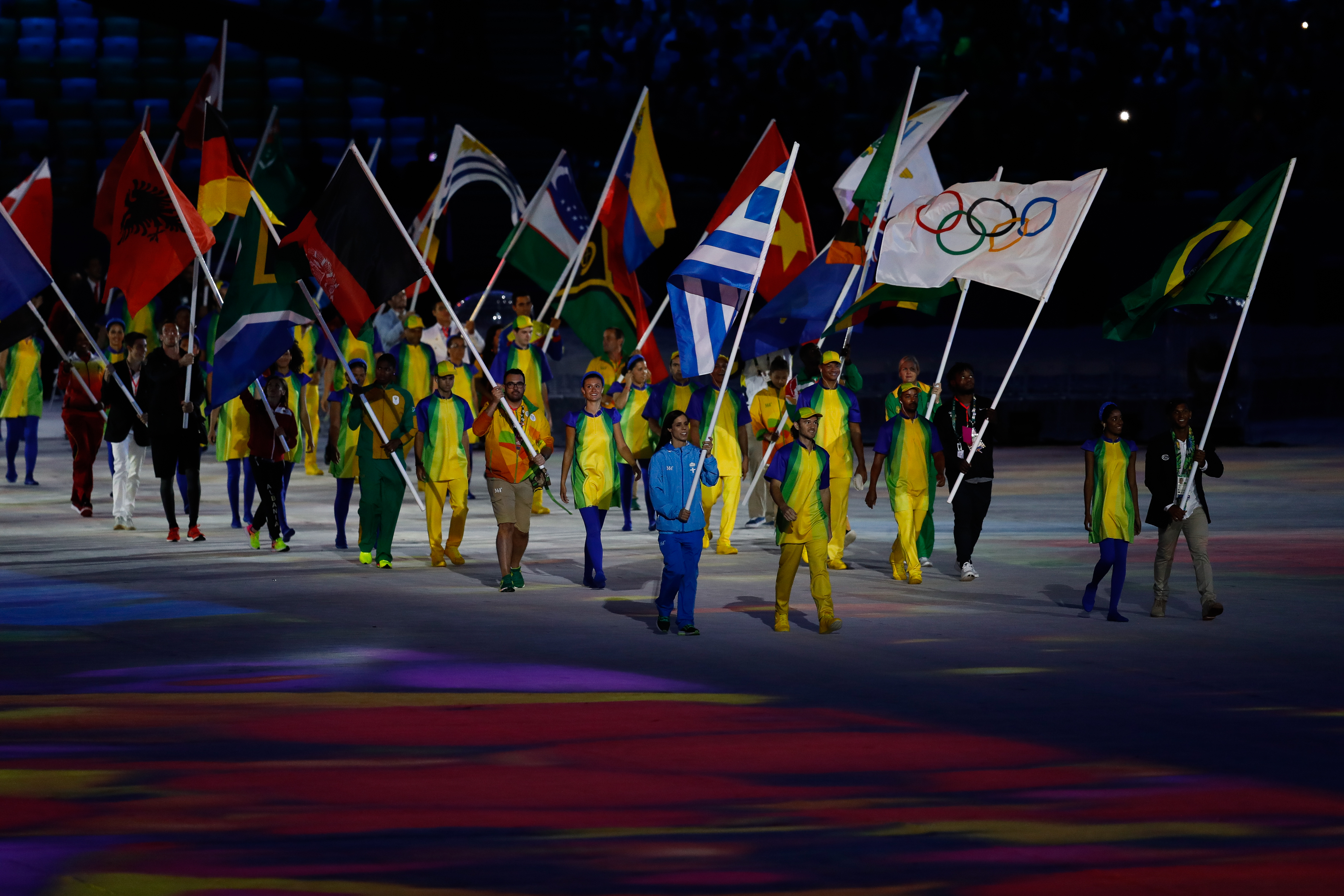
The flag parade during the closing ceremony of the Rio 2016 Summer Olympics

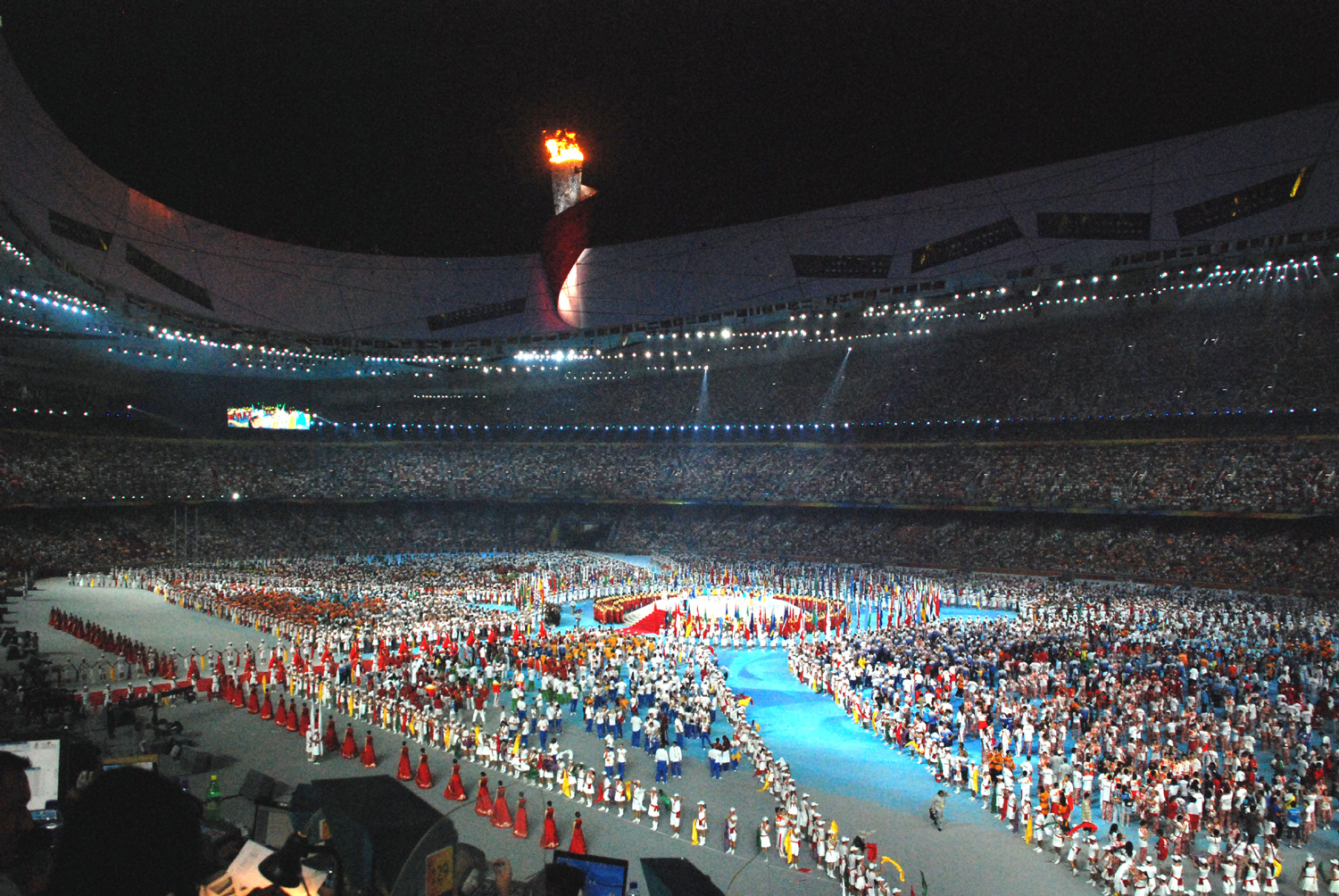
Athletes gather in the stadium during the closing ceremony of the 2008 Summer Olympics in Beijing.

Traditionally more relaxed and festive than the opening ceremony, the closing ceremony has developed historically through traditions rather than official rules and procedures. The closing ceremony is held on the final Sunday evening of the Games.

Between 1896 and 2000, in addition to the anthem of the host country, the Greek anthem and the anthem of the next host country were commonly played in this opening segment. Because of changes implemented in 2005, the closing ceremony commonly begins with the entrance of the IOC president, along with the head of state or representative of the host country; these entrances are followed by the raising of the host country's flag and a performance of this country's national anthem, followed by an artistic program.

Because of the flexibility of the closing ceremony, it is commonly shorter than the opening ceremony.

=== Parade of athletes ===
The protocol portion of the closing ceremony usually starts with the entry of the nations' flags, where flagbearers from each participating country enter the stadium field at the main entrance. Since the 2002 Winter Olympics, the Organizing Committee is responsible for deciding whether athletes will enter according to the protocol order used during the opening ceremony. The only requirements are that the Greek flag leads the parade, and the host country's flag appears last. As an example of this rule's flexibility, at the 2012 Summer Olympics, during the closing ceremony, the flags of Great Britain as the host country and Brazil as the next host country entered together at the end of this parade. If circumstances permit, the athletes all march en masse with no distinction or grouping by nationality. This blending of athletes, known as the "parade of athletes", is a tradition that began during the 1956 Summer Olympics at the suggestion of Melbourne schoolboy John Ian Wing; he thought that this parade would be a way to bring the athletes of the world together as "one nation". Before the 1956 Summer Games, no Olympic team had ever marched in the closing ceremony of the modern or ancient Games.

=== Final medal ceremony ===
Starting with the 2004 Summer Olympics, after all national flags and athletes have entered the stadium, the final medal presentation of the Games is held. In consultation with the IOC, the Organizing Committee of the host city may determine which event will have its medals presented. During the Summer Olympics, this presentation is reserved for the award ceremony for the men's marathon. (Starting with the 2020 Summer Olympics, the award ceremony for the women's marathon also takes place during the closing ceremony.) Traditionally, the men's marathon is held on the last day of competition, and the race finishes within hours of the start of the closing ceremony. However, at the recent Summer Games in Atlanta, Beijing, Rio, and Tokyo, marathon races have been staged in the early morning hours because of climate conditions in the host city (even though the marathons in 2020 were held in Sapporo, some 800 km away from Tokyo). This tradition has been adapted for the Winter Games: the closing ceremony includes the presentation of medals for the men's 50 km cross-country skiing event (since 2006), and medals for the women's 30 km cross-country skiing event (since 2014).

As another element of the ceremony, the newly elected members of the IOC Athletes' Commission are required to present a bouquet of flowers to a representative of the Games volunteers as a thank-you for their contributions.

=== Olympic host handover ===
Next, while the Olympic Hymn is played, the Olympic flag that was raised up the flagpole during the opening ceremony is lowered and carried from the stadium.

In what is known as the Antwerp Ceremony (because the tradition began at the Antwerp Games), the current mayor of the city that organized the Games transfers the official Olympic flag to the president of the IOC, who then passes it on to the current mayor of the city hosting the next Olympic Games. The receiving mayor then waves the flag eight times. During the closing ceremony, the mayor of the current host city stands to the left, the president of the IOC stands in the middle, and the mayor of the next host city stands to the right. Until the 1984 Summer Olympic Games, the Antwerp Ceremony was performed during the Games' opening ceremony.

Following changes during the 2006 Winter Olympics, the Antwerp Ceremony starts with two additional national flags raised on flagpoles one at a time, while the corresponding national anthems are played. First, on a mast located at the rostrum tip, the Greek flag is raised first, to honor the birthplace of the Olympic Games; second, the flag of the country hosting the next Summer or Winter Olympic Games is raised. "Hymn to Liberty", the national anthem of Greece, has been performed at every closing ceremony of the Olympic Games since the current rules were adopted. This protocol segment received more attention during the closing ceremonies of the 1980 Summer Olympics, because the US was scheduled to host the next Summer Olympics, was the time of the US anthem being played while its flag was raised, the flag of Los Angeles was raised with the Olympic Anthem played instead of "The Star-Spangled Banner" as a consequence of the constraints that led to the 1980 Summer Olympics boycott. In Sydney and Athens, two Greek flags were raised because Greece would be hosting the 2004 Games.

During modern Olympic history, five protocol flags have been used:

- The Antwerp flag was presented to the IOC at the 1920 Summer Olympics by the city of Antwerp, Belgium. This flag was passed on to the next organizing city of the Summer Olympics through the 1984 Summer Games in Los Angeles, California, when the flag eventually wore out and became torn.
- The Oslo flag was used during the Winter Games, and it was presented to the IOC at the 1952 Winter Olympics by the city of Oslo, Norway. The flag was passed on to the next organizing city of the Winter Olympics. This flag was used until the 2014 Games in Sochi, Russia, when it wore out over time (like the Antwerp flag) and became torn. Until the adoption of the PyeongChang flag, several replicas of this flag were commonly used during handover ceremonies; the original flag was stored inside a transparent box, and it was delivered to the next headquarters shortly after the closing ceremony, in a separate location at the Olympic Stadium. Because of its stage of conservation and its worn fabric, this flag faded and needed to be replaced.
- The Seoul flag was presented to the IOC at the 1988 Summer Olympics by the city of Seoul, South Korea, as a replacement for the Antwerp flag. The Seoul flag, made of pure Korean silk, wore out over time, became fragile, and accidentally tore during the closing of the 2012 Summer Olympics. Therefore, the IOC decided to retire this flag in 2013.
- The Rio flag was presented to the IOC at the 2016 Summer Olympics by the city of Rio de Janeiro, Brazil, as a replacement for the Seoul flag, since Rio de Janeiro was the first host city in South America. The Rio flag is the version currently used during the Antwerp Ceremony of the Summer Games.
- The PyeongChang flag was presented to the IOC at the 2018 Winter Olympics by the city of PyeongChang, South Korea, as a replacement for the Oslo flag, which had deteriorated and could disintegrate at any time. The PyeongChang flag is currently passed on to the next organizing city of the Winter Olympics.

This segment of the closing ceremony took place during the opening ceremonies until the 1984 Summer Games and the 1988 Winter Games.

At this point in the closing ceremony, the next host city introduces itself with a cultural presentation. This tradition began with the 1976 Summer Olympics, and it was modernized several times until the recent rules were applied in 2020.

=== Official closing of the Games ===
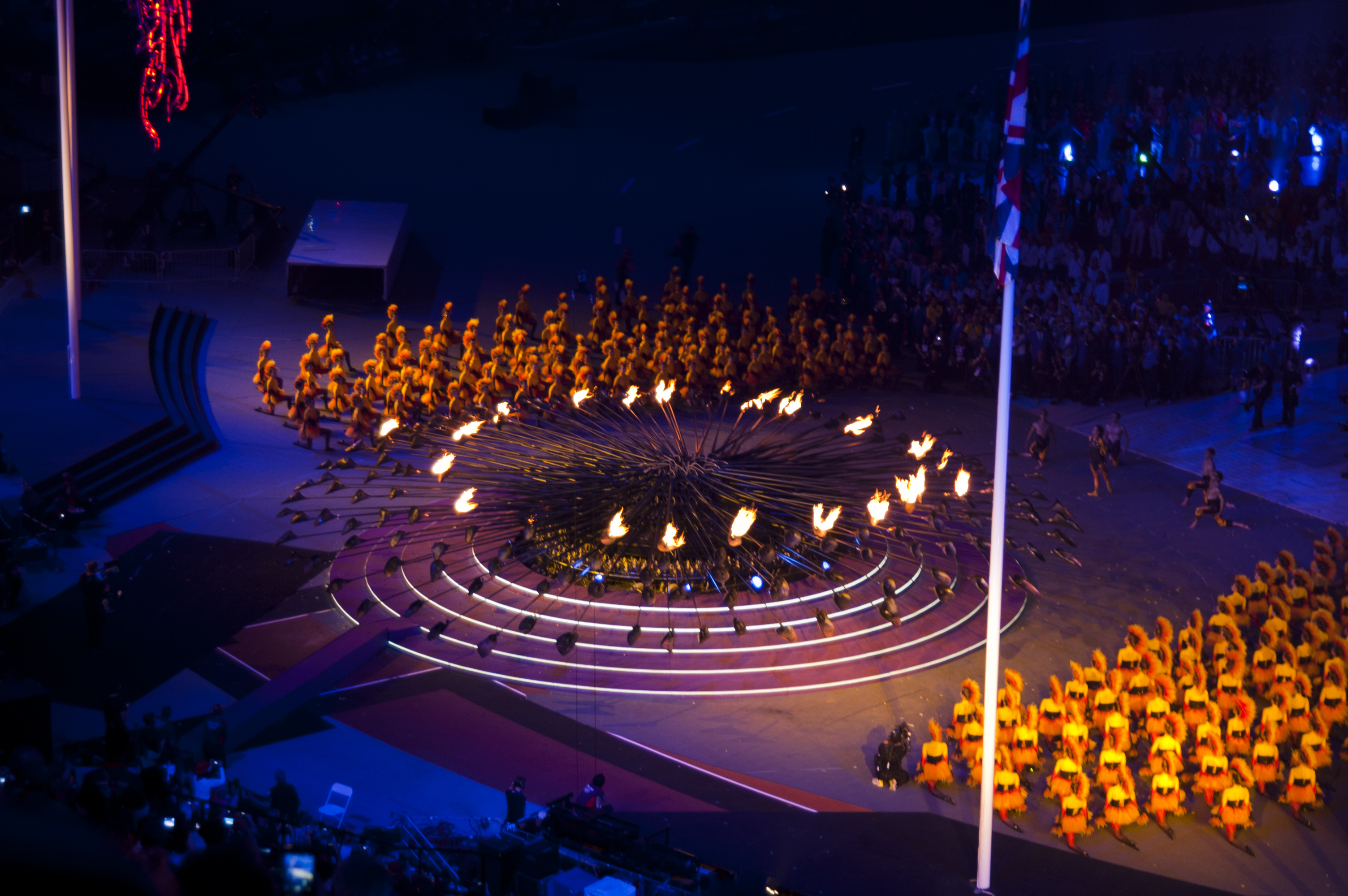
The Olympic Flame slowly dying at the end of the London 2012 Summer Olympics

After the host handover, the president of the host city's Organizing Committee makes a speech. The IOC president then makes a speech before closing the Olympics:

And now, I declare the Games of the [ordinal number of modern Olympiads] Olympiad/[ordinal number of Winter Olympics] Olympic Winter Games closed; and in accordance with our tradition, I call upon the youth of the world to assemble, four years from now, in [name of next host city] to celebrate with us; the Games of the [subsequent ordinal number of Summer Olympics] Olympiad/[subsequent ordinal number of Winter Olympics] Olympic Winter Games.

If the next Olympic Games is not scheduled for four years after the current one, the IOC president instead references the altered timeframe. For instance, the 2020 Summer Olympics were postponed until 2021 because of the COVID-19 pandemic; therefore IOC President Thomas Bach stated: "I call upon the youth of the world to assemble, three years from now, in Paris." A similar situation occurred at the 1992 Winter Olympics, which were held only two years before the next Winter Olympics in 1994, so that the Summer and Winter Games would be in different years in the future. Unlike the opening ceremony, the head of state or representative of the host country does not give a speech at the closing ceremony.

Finally, the Olympic cauldron is extinguished, marking the end of the current Games and the start of a new cycle.

After the ceremony protocol has concluded, the ceremony commonly continues with an "afterparty" of concert performances as a finale. For example, the 2000 Summer Games closing ceremony featured Australian musicians; the 2010 Winter Games closing ceremony featured Canadian musicians; the 2016 closing ceremony featured a tribute to the Rio Carnival; and the 2018 Winter Olympic Games opening and closing ceremonies focused on the Korean Wave movement, with boy group Exo performing. The IOC added a performance by the Dutch disc jockey (DJ) Martin Garrix.
