= Truce (disambiguation) =

Truce or ceasefire is a temporary stoppage of any armed conflict.

Truce may also refer to:

- Truce (album), a 1982 album by Robin Trower and Jack Bruce
- Truce (group), British R&B trio in the 1990s
- "Truce" (song), a 1998 song by Jars of Clay
- "Truce" (Tom Robinson song), on the 1982 album Cabaret '79
- Truce term, a word used by children to call for a temporary respite
- Ekecheiria, the spirit and personification of truce in Greek mythology
- Flag of truce, an internationally recognized white flag
- "Truce", a song by Twenty One Pilots from their album Vessel

== See also ==
- The Truce (disambiguation)
