= International sporting sanctions during the Russian invasion of Ukraine =

Sport measures against Russia and Belarus since 2022

The exclusion of Russian and Belarusian athletes and teams from most international sports competitions, widely referred to as the sanctions, or boycott, on Russian sport, in response to the 24th February 2022 Russian invasion of Ukraine, represents one of the most comprehensive responses by global sporting bodies. The measures began with a swift recommendation from the International Olympic Committee (IOC) and were implemented by numerous federations within days.

Over the subsequent four years, the situation evolved from blanket exclusions to carefully conditioned neutral participation for individuals, while team bans largely remained in place. The IOC lifted its ban in July 2026.

== Background ==
Since 1993, the United Nations General Assembly has supported the IOC and the development of the Olympic and Paralympic Games by adopting a resolution every two years that calls on member states to observe the Olympic Truce.

UN General Assembly resolution A-RES-76-13

On 2 December 2021, at the 76th session of the UN General Assembly in New York, a resolution titled "Building a peaceful and better world through sport and the Olympic ideal" was adopted by consensus, with 173 of the 193 member states voting in favor. The resolution called for the observance of the Olympic Truce for the Beijing 2022 Winter Olympic and Paralympic Games, covering the period from seven days before the start of the Olympic Games until seven days after the conclusion of the Paralympic Games.

Given that the Beijing Winter Olympics began on 4 February 2022, Russia initially observed the start of the truce. The truce period, however, was set to last until seven days after the end of the Winter Paralympics, which, according to the official schedule, concluded on 13 March 2022. Therefore, the Olympic Truce was in effect until 20 March 2022.

On 24 February 2022, Russia launched a military invasion of Ukraine. On the same day, the IOC strongly condemned this violation of the Olympic Truce in an official statement. The following day, the IOC Executive Board urged all international sports federations to cancel or relocate any sports events planned for Russia or Belarus due to the breach of the truce. Furthermore, the IOC stipulated that no Russian or Belarusian flags or national anthems should be displayed at any international sports event.

== Chronology of key suspensions ==
=== 24 February ===
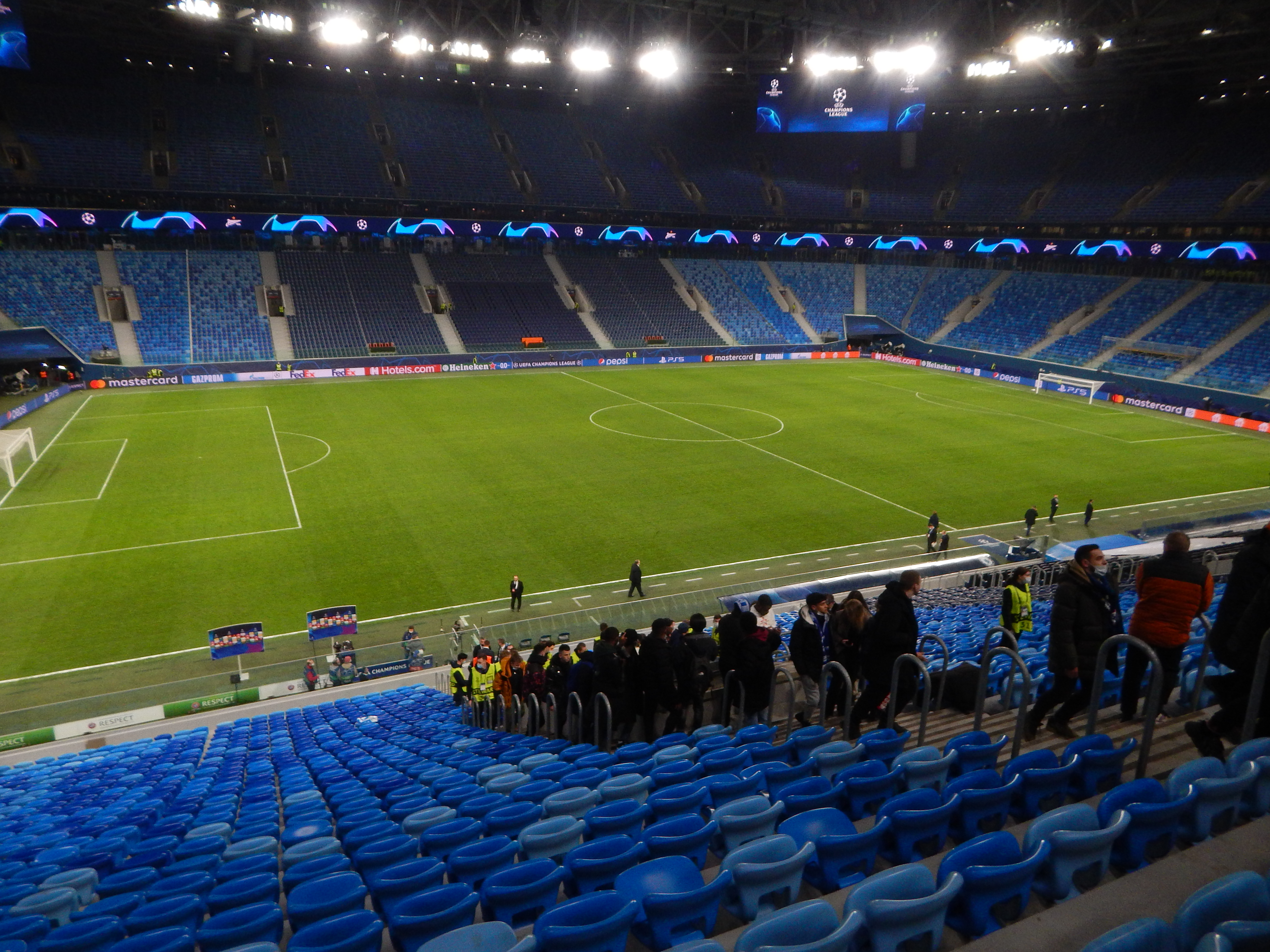
Saint Petersburg Arena after a UEFA Champions League match in 2021

The UEFA Executive Committee decided to relocate the final of the men's Champions League from the Gazprom Arena in Saint Petersburg to the Stade de France. On 28 February, UEFA decided to end its partnership with Gazprom across all competitions.

The ATP chose to move the St. Petersburg Open tournament.

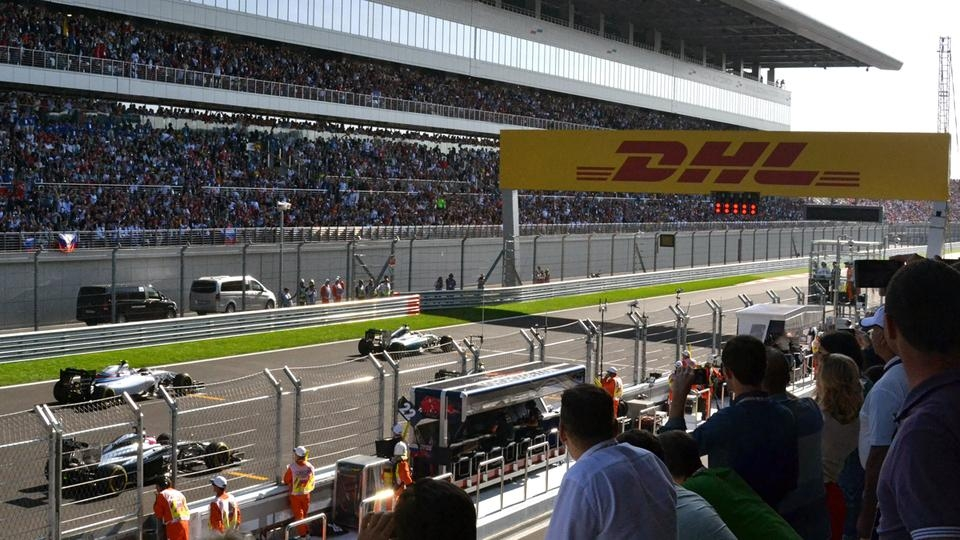
The starting grid at the 2014 Russian Grand Prix

Formula 1 suspended the Russian Grand Prix, scheduled to take place in Sochi in September 2022. World Champions Sebastian Vettel and Max Verstappen had previously called for the cancellation of the race. On 3 March, the contract with the promoter was terminated, and it was stated that Russia would "not have a race in the foreseeable future". Later, Formula 1 stopped official broadcasts in Russia and blocked access to its website from Russian territory.

=== 25 February ===
The International Federation of Sport Climbing (IFSC) announced the suspension of the Boulder and Speed World Cup in Moscow, 1–3 April, with intent to relocate and reschedule the event.

The International Ski Federation (FIS) announced that all remaining events in Russia were cancelled.

The World Curling Federation announced that the 2022 European Curling Championship, scheduled for 19–26 November, will no longer be held in Perm.

=== 26 February ===
The owner of the English football club Chelsea, Russian national Roman Abramovich, announced he would hand "stewardship" of the club to the trustees of the team's charitable foundation in an attempt to shield it from future repercussions.

Similarly, the major international boxing organizations (IBF, WBC, WBA, WBO) announced the suspension of championship events in Russia until further notice.

The volleyball federations of France and Poland, the reigning Olympic and World champions respectively, declared they would withdraw from the men's World Championship if it were to be held in Russia.

=== 27 February ===
The International Swimming Federation (FINA) cancelled the World Junior Championships scheduled to be held in Russia and confirmed that no other international competitions would be held in the country until further notice. Subsequently, the championship was moved to Lima, Peru.

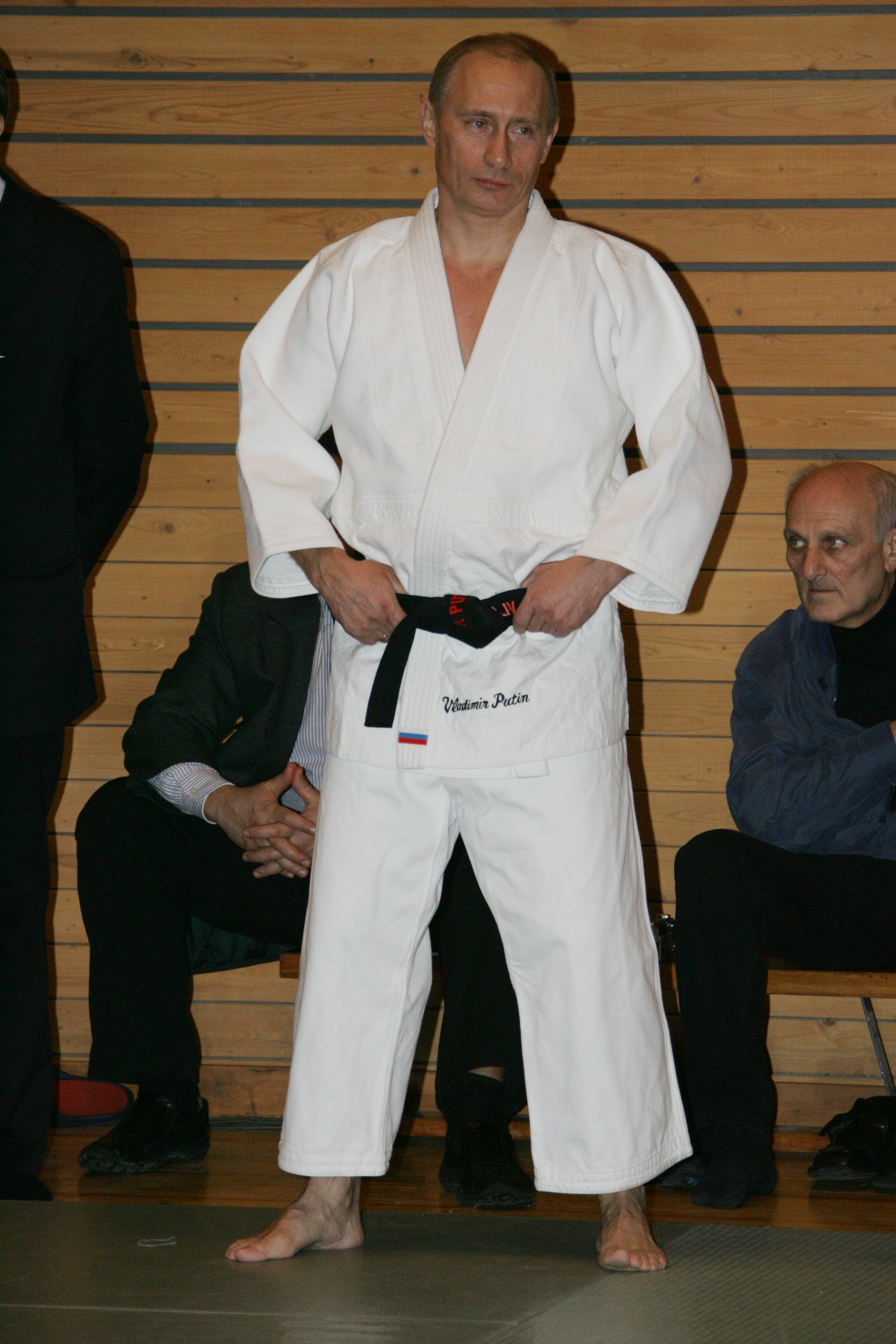
Vladimir Putin in judo uniform

The International Judo Federation (IJF) suspended Russian President Vladimir Putin from his positions as Honorary President and Ambassador of the organization.

=== 28 February ===
The IOC issued a resolution in which it:

1. Recommended that international sports federations not invite or permit the participation of Russian and Belarusian athletes and officials in international competitions.
2. Stated that where participation is unavoidable for logistical reasons, Russian or Belarusian individuals or teams should only be allowed as neutrals, without any national symbols, colors, flags, or anthems being displayed.
3. Reiterated its recommendation not to organize sports events in Russia and Belarus.
4. Withdrew the Olympic Order from key Russian government officials, including President Vladimir Putin (who had received the Olympic Order in 2001).

The IOC said that the recommendation was made "in order to protect the integrity of global sports competitions and for the safety of all the participants", adding that it had acted with a "heavy heart".

On the same day, FIFA suspended Russian national teams from participating in the 2022 World Cup. UEFA concurrently announced the disqualification of Russian clubs from its international competitions.

The International Ice Hockey Federation (IIHF) suspended all Russian and Belarusian national teams and clubs from its competitions across all categories until further notice.

=== 1 March ===
World Athletics announced the immediate exclusion of athletes and officials from Russia and Belarus from all World Athletics Series events "for the foreseeable future".

The International Volleyball Federation (FIVB) withdrew Russia's hosting rights of the 2022 Men's World Championship scheduled for August and September.

The ski federations of the Scandinavian countries, Norway and Sweden, announced that Russian and Belarusian athletes would not be allowed to enter their territories to participate in competitions scheduled for the following month.

The British government declared that national sports teams from Russia and Belarus were considered "persona non grata".

=== 3 March ===
The International Paralympic Committee on 3 March banned Russian athletes from competing at the 2022 Winter Paralympics.

=== 4–5 March ===
Following a 1 March meeting of the World Motor Sport Council, the Fédération Internationale de l'Automobile announced three days later the introduction of "circular-emergency measures". Such policies barred Russian and Belarusian drivers from competing in FIA-sanctioned races unless they agreed to conditions such as condemning the invasion and to not use their respective countries' emblems. Those with multiple citizenships were not affected by the rule and could compete under their other nationality.

Unlike its auto racing counterpart, the Fédération Internationale de Motocyclisme imposed a full ban on Russian and Belarusian riders from international motorcycle racing events. The decision came after the FIM Board of Directors met on 5 March.

== National responses to the suspensions ==
Several National Olympic Committees (NOCs) publicly endorsed the IOC's recommendation to exclude Russian and Belarusian athletes from international competitions, including those of Australia, Croatia, Denmark, Ecuador, Netherlands, Portugal, Spain, Switzerland and the United Kingdom. In most cases, these endorsements were accompanied by practical measures restricting sporting relations with Russia and Belarus and relocating events previously scheduled in those countries.

In Australia, the NOC urged member federations not to invite Russian or Belarusian athletes and to withdraw from events involving them. Denmark's NOC and Sports Confederation publicly supported a comprehensive ban and called on clubs to sever sporting relations. Ecuador prohibited Russian and Belarusian athletes from competing in tournaments held on its territory.

The Netherlands' Olympic Committee urged international federations to relocate events from Russia and Belarus and to exclude their athletes from competitions abroad. Spain introduced a ban on Russian national teams and athletes competing under the Russian flag in events organized on Spanish territory and requested Spanish federations to avoid participation in events held in Russia. Portugal's federations facilitated the temporary registration and support of Ukrainian athletes displaced by the war.

Poland combined sporting and humanitarian measures: the Polish Football Association refused to play Russia in the 2022 FIFA World Cup qualification playoffs and supported regulatory changes allowing simplified registration of Ukrainian players in Polish leagues. Croatia provided training facilities for Ukrainian athletes and supported charity football matches involving Ukrainian clubs.

In Sweden, the national sports confederation requested government funding to support Ukrainian refugees through sports programmes, while some federations recommended limiting contractual relations with Russian players. In the United Kingdom, government sanctions against Russian individuals had direct consequences for sport, most notably in the forced sale of Chelsea FC following sanctions imposed on Roman Abramovich; Wimbledon also imposed a unilateral ban on Russian and Belarusian players in 2022.

== Impact on sponsorship agreements ==
The suspension of Russian sport was accompanied in several countries by the termination or reassessment of sponsorship agreements involving Russian companies. While some states had limited exposure to Russian or Belarusian sponsors, others saw high-profile commercial relationships suspended.

In the United Kingdom, Manchester United terminated its sponsorship agreement with Aeroflot, and Everton suspended partnerships with Russian companies linked to sanctioned individuals. In Italy, AC Milan ended its partnership with the Russian betting company FonBet.

Spanish clubs responded differently: Real Madrid cancelled a regional sponsorship agreement with Fonbet and announced humanitarian donations related to the war, whereas FC Barcelona maintained its sponsorship arrangement with the Russian betting company 1xBET. In Switzerland, the ice hockey club EV Zug suspended its sponsorship agreement with Nord Stream AG. At the European level, the EHF Champions League released clubs from certain obligations connected to sponsorship arrangements involving Nord Stream 2 AG.

Adidas suspended its long-term kit partnership with the Russian Football Union, which first began in 2008. Adidas had provided all Russian teams with kits and had expanded the federation's replica kit sales in the retail market.

== Russian football suspension ==
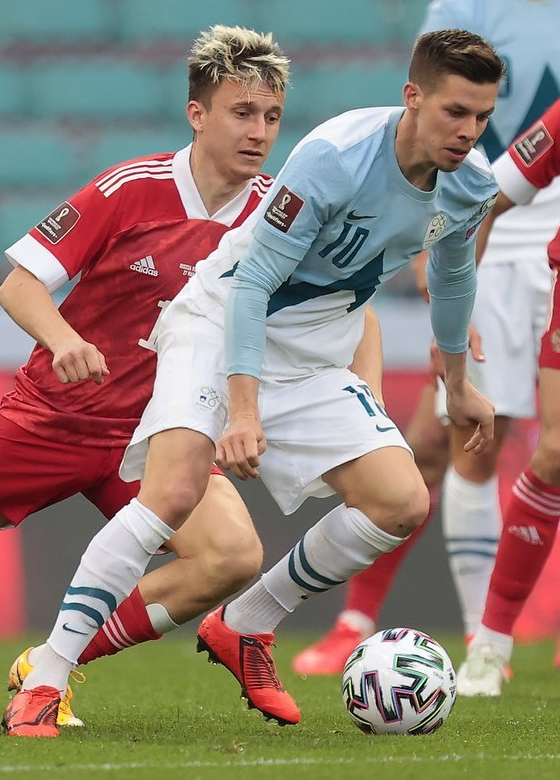
Aleksandr Golovin (in red) during a 2022 FIFA World Cup qualifying match between Russia and Slovenia, in Sochi, 27 March 2021

On 24 February 2022, the three teams in Russia's 2022 World Cup qualifying playoffs, namely the Czech Republic, Poland, and Sweden, immediately declared their unwillingness to play any matches on Russian territory. Within days, this stance hardened into a total boycott: Poland and Sweden extended their refusal to all qualifying games on 26 February, with the Czech Republic following suit the next day. This collective decision effectively eliminated Russia from contention, as it prevented them from playing their playoff match against Poland, as well as any potential final against the Czech Republic or Sweden.

On 27 February, FIFA announced a number of sanctions impacting Russia's participation in international football. Russia was prohibited from hosting international competitions, and the national team was ordered to play all home matches behind closed doors in neutral countries. Under these sanctions, Russia would not be allowed to compete under the country's name, flag, or national anthem; similarly to the Russian athletes' participation in events such as the Olympics, the team would compete under the abbreviation of their national federation, the Russian Football Union (RFU), rather than "Russia".

The next day, on 28 February, FIFA decided to suspend Russia from international competitions "until further notice", including its participation in the 2022 World Cup in Qatar. UEFA concurrently announced the disqualification of Russian clubs from its international competitions.

By May, UEFA published clarifications on how the qualification cycle would continue without Russia — which included annulling results and recalculating groups in national and youth team tournaments.

On 20 September, UEFA officially confirmed that Russia was not included in the draw for qualification for Euro 2024 precisely because all Russian teams remained suspended "until further notice". At the same time, it was publicly affirmed that Russia was excluded from the qualification process.

The RFU unsuccessfully appealed the FIFA ban to the Court of Arbitration for Sport, which upheld the ban. The final texts of the rulings and press releases acknowledge the situation as "extraordinary," as well as the high threshold for interfering in the autonomy of sports organizations when their measures are motivated by the conduct of competitions and safety, rather than a "punitive" purpose. In the commission's view, it is regrettable that the current military operations in Ukraine, for which Russian football teams, clubs, and players bear no responsibility, have, as a result of the decisions by FIFA and UEFA, had such a negative impact on them and on Russian football as a whole. However, in the commission's opinion, these consequences were outweighed by the need to ensure the safe and orderly conduct of football events for the rest of the world.

During the ban, talk circulated that the RFU were considering seeking to change confederations to the Asian Football Confederation, but this ultimately never happened.

On 11 November 2024, a circular distributed by UEFA stated 192 group stage matches would take place, confirming Russia's exclusion from participating in the 2026 FIFA World Cup qualification.

=== U-17 return attempt ===
In October 2023, FIFA and UEFA lifted their ban on Russian U-17 teams, permitting them to rejoin international competitions. In a statement, UEFA emphasized that "It is particularly aggrieving that, due to the enduring conflict, a generation of minors is deprived of its right to compete in international football". While UEFA President Aleksander Čeferin ruled out any further softening of the ban regarding Russian adult teams, he stressed the organization's stance on youth: "Uefa is determined that this position will continue until the war is over and peace restored. But by banning children from our competitions, we not only fail to recognise and uphold a fundamental right for their holistic development but we directly discriminate against them".

This decision drew opposition from Ukraine and several other UEFA member associations. The vice presidents from England, Poland and Wales refused to support the proposal and at least 12 of the 55 member stated that their teams would continue to refuse to play matches against Russia. Two weeks later, UEFA abandoned the plan, stating that "the agenda point was withdrawn as no technical solution to allow Russian teams to play could be found".

=== Reactions ===
Some observers, while approving of the boycott of Russia, have pointed out that FIFA did not boycott Saddam Hussein's Iraq as an aggressor during the Iran–Iraq War, Saudi Arabia for its military intervention in Yemen, Qatar for its human rights violations, or the United States for the actions of the US military during the Iraq War.

In September 2025, in an interview with Politico, Aleksander Čeferin stated that the ban on Russian teams had not contributed to ending the war in Ukraine: "Now, the ban for Russian teams is, I think, three and a half years. Did the [Ukraine] war stop? It didn't". Čeferin noted that "the situation in Russia and Ukraine, there was a super strong political pressure. Now it's more a pressure of the civil society than politicians, because politicians are obviously, when it comes to wars and victims, very pragmatic. I cannot say what will happen. There are talks about everything, but me personally, I'm against kicking the athletes out". Čeferin also supported the idea of reinstating Russian youth teams under 17 in European competitions: "I still think that the children should be treated differently because, you know, they are raised in fear and hatred".

In February 2026, in an interview with Sky, FIFA President Gianni Infantino stated the need to consider the issue of Russia's return to participation in international football tournaments, and that the current ban had achieved nothing. "It has only generated more disappointment and hatred", Infantino stated.

== Russian Olympic Committee suspension ==
On 12 October 2023, the IOC issued a statement noting that after Russia began its full-scale invasion of Ukraine in 2022, the Russian Olympic Committee (ROC) unilaterally transferred four regions that were originally under the jurisdiction of the National Olympic Committee of Ukraine: Donetsk Oblast, Luhansk Oblast, Kherson Oblast, and Zaporizhzhia Oblast to the ROC; at the time, its president said "I don't see any difficulties here". The IOC stated that the ROC's unilateral action constituted a breach of the Olympic Charter because it violated the territorial integrity of the NOC of Ukraine, and further announced the immediate suspension of the membership of the ROC. The IOC stated that as a result the ROC was no longer entitled to operate as a National Olympic Committee, and could not receive any funding from the Olympic Movement, and that the IOC reserved the right to decide about the participation of individual neutral athletes with a Russian passport in the Olympic Games Paris 2024 and the Olympic Winter Games Milano Cortina 2026.

In February 2024, the arbitration confirmed the legality of this decision.

On 7 May 2026, the IOC lifted its recommendations on restrictions against Belarus Olympic Committee, while maintaining the suspension on ROC. In turn, several sports federations, including World Athletics and International Tennis Federation, stated that the suspension of Belarusian athletes would remain in force despite the IOC's recommendations. On 7 July 2026, the IOC lifted its recommendations on restrictions against the ROC, after ensuring that the ROC does not conduct activities in the Russian-occupied territories of Ukraine or include regional sports organizations from there as its members. Russian sports minister Mikhail Delyagin said that this will allow sporting federations to lift bans on Russian athletes in time for them to participate in the qualifying events for the 2028 Los Angeles Olympics.

== Russian Paralympic Committee suspension ==
On 2 March 2022, the International Paralympic Committee (IPC) announced that the Russian Paralympic Committee (RPC) team designation would be banned and that Russian athletes could only compete at the 2022 Winter Paralympics under a fully neutral designation as in 2018. However, the very next day, after boycott threats from other nations, the IPC banned Russian athletes from competing entirely. IPC President Andrew Parsons stated that the organisation had initially attempted to preserve the participation of athletes while protecting the integrity of the Games. However, after multiple national delegations threatened to boycott the Paralympics and raised concerns about the viability of the competitions, the IPC concluded that excluding Russian and Belarusian athletes had become the only workable solution to ensure the Games could proceed safely.

On 16 November, the IPC again suspended the RPC at an extraordinary meeting of the IPC General Assembly.

In September 2023 there was again partial suspension of RPC.

=== Membership reinstatement ===
On 27 September 2025, the IPC General Assembly fully reinstated the membership of the RPC, with the country returning to the Paralympic Games in 2026. Despite mounting international pressure and boycott threats by several national Paralympic committees (such as Ukraine and the Czech Republic), the IPC confirmed it will uphold its decision to allow Russian and Belarusian athletes to compete under their national flags and anthems at the 2026 Winter Paralympics, with IPC President Andrew Parsons stating the decision is final and irreversible. In addition, Andrew Parsons stated that injured Russian soldiers would be allowed to compete at a future Paralympic Games.

== Recommendation of neutral athlete status ==
The final version of the AIN flag assigned by the IOC in March 2024

In 2023, the discussion about a complete ban began to shift into a discussion about a "neutral return". On 28 March 2023, the Olympic movement, citing a request from the Olympic Summit and four months of consultations, issued a set of recommendations for federations on the possible admission of athletes with Russian or Belarusian passports solely as Individual Neutral Athletes (AIN), but emphasized that the question of participation in Paris 2024 was "not under consideration".

Admission to AIN is possible only on an individual basis, with teams being excluded; athletes and support personnel who "actively support the war" are cut off, as are those who have contracts with the military or national security bodies. The mandatory requirement for anti-doping compliance is also emphasized separately.

In December 2023, the Olympic movement moved from general principles to "Olympic admission": it was announced that Russian and Belarusian athletes could participate in Olympic Games Paris 2024 as neutrals, without flags, emblems, or anthems, with team sports being excluded.

Russian officials publicly labeled the conditions as "discriminatory", while the Ukrainian side and a number of its allies repeatedly warned of the possibility of boycotting the Olympics if Russians and Belarusians were allowed to compete — even as neutrals.

== Olympic participation after 2022 ==
Games	Russian AIN participants	Belarusian AIN participants	Notes
Paris 2024 (Summer)	15	17	Individual sports only; no team events; limited to approved individuals; ongoing vetting for war support
Milan-Cortina 2026 (Winter)	13	7	Individual sports only; no team events; limited to approved individuals; ongoing vetting for war support

=== 2024 Summer Olympics ===
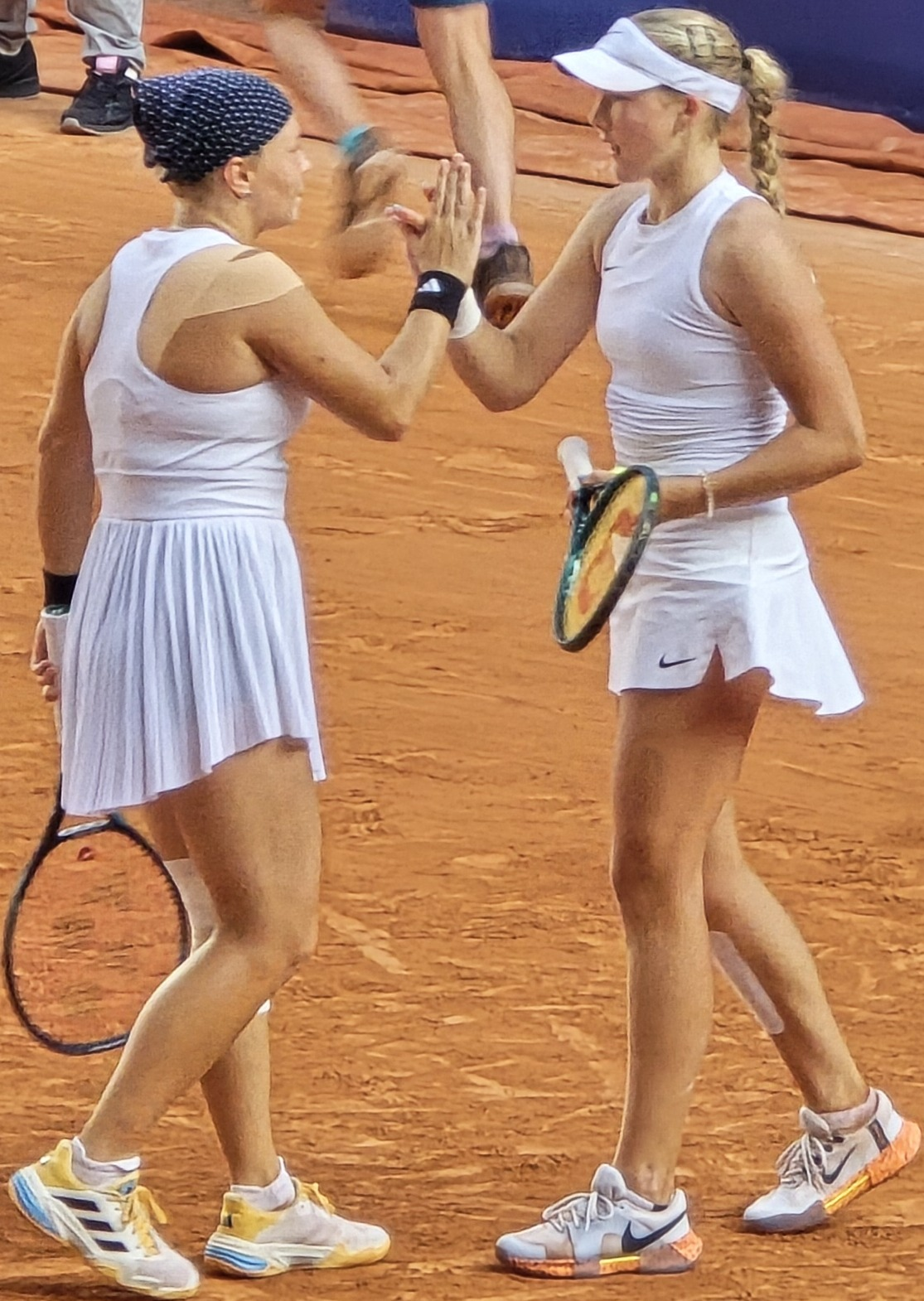
Mirra Andreeva and Diana Shnaider on 2024 Summer Olympics women's doubles tennis tournament

The scale of participation at Paris 2024 turned out to be minimal compared to "pre-war" delegations: 32 neutral athletes (15 from Russia and 17 from Belarus) competed in the Games across 10 sports.

Russian sports structures employed a "boycott" and "forced self-restrictions" (stemming from disagreement with the vetting process and criteria, as well as due to invitations not being extended to many leading athletes). For instance, the Russian Judo Federation sent no one to Paris after only four out of 17 contenders were approved to compete in neutral status, deeming such conditions humiliating and politically motivated. A similar situation emerged in wrestling: in the summer of 2024, it was reported that a group of Russian wrestlers refused invitations to the Olympics amid disputes over who was allowed/not allowed to compete as neutrals and, consequently, over the "quality" of the Olympic tournament without the top athletes.

At Paris 2024, the neutral athletes did not participate in the opening ceremony as a delegation. However, the Olympic authorities allowed them to take part in the closing ceremony, explaining this by stating that the closing was organized "as an athletes' event", not a parade of national teams, and that the flag of the neutral athletes would not be used.

=== 2026 Winter Olympics ===
At the Milan-Cortina 2026 Winter Games, 13 Russian and 7 Belarusian athletes competed as Individual Neutral Athletes across sports including figure skating, cross-country skiing, and speed skating. The same neutral conditions applied and Russians remained absent from the official medal table. Ukrainian officials boycotted related Paralympic ceremonies in protest at any Russian presence.

== Courts and arbitration ==
The reaction of Russian sporting organisations, clubs and athletes to the invasion of Ukraine varied significantly; while some publicly distanced themselves from the political context, many Russian federations, clubs and individual athletes chose to challenge the measures imposed by international sports bodies, filing multiple appeals before the Court of Arbitration for Sport (CAS) and the internal judicial bodies of international federations. Russia's legal strategy developed along two principal lines: contesting specific federation decisions, particularly in football and certain individual sports, and disputing broader measures adopted within the Olympic movement concerning the status of the Russian Olympic Committee.

In football, the key body of decisions from 2022 illustrates the position of the CAS: the suspension was viewed as an administrative measure by the competition organizer, rather than a disciplinary punishment for violating "football" rules; the war and its consequences were described as a force majeure environment for holding competitions (sanctions, travel bans, refusal of opponents to play), while it was emphasized that an association's right to participate in tournaments is not absolute and may yield to the broader interests of the competition system. For instance, the text of the arbitration ruling in the case of the Russian Football Union versus football authorities emphasizes the "high threshold" for interfering in the autonomy of sport and the legitimacy of exceptional measures under "the rarest of circumstances".

Along the "Olympic" line, the case of 2023–2024 is indicative: the decision to suspend the Russian Olympic Committee for including regional organizations from occupied territories was challenged, but the arbitration upheld it. This demonstrates that even where the Olympic movement declares its intention not to punish individual athletes "for the actions of the state", institutional violations (in the terminology of the Olympic Charter—the territorial integrity of the NOC) are interpreted as an independent basis for sanctions against the NOC.

In October 2025, the CAS issued a ruling that allowed Russian luge athletes to participate in qualifying competitions as neutral participants, after the International Luge Federation extended the existing exclusion of Russian athletes from its competitions in July.

On 2 December, the CAS announced that it had partially upheld appeals against the decision of the International Ski and Snowboard Federation (FIS), which was a "blanket" exclusion of athletes based on nationality. The arbitrators indicated that the FIS statutes protect individuals from discrimination and require political neutrality, and therefore a "blanket exclusion" (total non-admission "by passport", without assessing whether an individual meets the criteria for neutral status) is unlawful.

The practical effect of this ruling was not a "return under the flag", but rather a legal compulsion for the federation to open its qualification events and the Olympic pathway to neutral athletes, provided they meet the neutrality criteria (essentially, imposing the Individual Neutral Athlete model where the federation had attempted to maintain a complete suspension). This represents one of the few situations between 2022 and 2026 where the Russian side achieved a noticeable legal breakthrough in favor of participation, albeit in a "reduced" format.

Subsequent individual appeals, including one by cross-country skier Alexander Bolshunov ahead of the 2026 Winter Olympics, also failed to overturn exclusions where evidence of war support existed.

== Attempts at reinstatement ==
In boxing, the IBA decided as early as October 2022 to return Russians and Belarusians to competitions under their own flags, with national anthems played for gold medals, justifying this by citing political neutrality and equal treatment.

In judo, the IJF announced at the end of 2025 its decision to again allow Russians to compete under their national flag, with the anthem and symbols at IJF tournaments, thus ending the period of the neutral regime in this sport.

In chess, FIDE in December 2025 reinstated Russian and Belarusian teams in official competitions and restored the rights of young players; however, for adult teams, restrictions on national symbols remain in place pending consultations with Olympic structures.

On 11 December 2025 the IOC Olympic Summit supported its executive board's recommendation that youth athletes from Russia and Belarus no longer face access restrictions in individual or team youth competitions, with national flags and anthems permitted. Implementation was left to individual federations and was slated for consideration ahead of the 2026 Dakar Youth Olympic Games.

=== Admission of athletes to tournaments ===
==== Summer Olympics ====
Sport / Federation	Initial status after 2022 invasion	Neutral participation restored	Full reinstatement under flag
Aquatics (World Aquatics)	Banned in March 2022	3 September 2023	April 2026
Judo (International Judo Federation)	Events in Russia cancelled; athletes initially competed as neutrals	June 2022	November 2025
Taekwondo (World Taekwondo)	Russian and Belarusian athletes and officials were prohibited from World Taekwondo events in March 2022.	May 2023; Russian and Belarusian athletes were allowed to compete as Individual Neutral Athletes at the 2023 World Taekwondo Championships.	Early 2026
Wrestling (United World Wrestling)	Suspended in 2022	2023	May 2026
Gymnastics (International Gymnastics Federation / World Gymnastics)	Suspended in March 2022	Late 2024	May 2026
Fencing (International Fencing Federation)	Russian and Belarusian fencers were excluded from FIE events in 2022.	March 2023; the FIE voted to allow Russian and Belarusian fencers to return under neutral status.	July 2026
Equestrian Sports (International Federation for Equestrian Sports)	Russian and Belarusian athletes, horses and officials were barred from FEI events in March 2022.	December 2023; the FEI published criteria for Russian and Belarusian athletes, horses and officials to return as neutral participants.	Not restored
Modern pentathlon (Union Internationale de Pentathlon Moderne)	Russian and Belarusian athletes and officials were excluded from UIPM competitions in 2022.	2023; UIPM later adopted IOC-based conditions for the return of eligible athletes as neutral individuals.	July 2026
Triathlon (World Triathlon)	Russian and Belarusian athletes and officials were suspended from World Triathlon events in 2022.	2023; World Triathlon approved the return of eligible athletes as neutral individuals under strict conditions.	Not restored
Weightlifting (International Weightlifting Federation)	Russian and Belarusian athletes and officials were suspended from IWF events in March 2022.	2023; the IWF permitted participation by eligible athletes as Individual Neutral Athletes.	June 2026
Badminton (Badminton World Federation)	Russian and Belarusian players and officials were banned from BWF-sanctioned tournaments in March 2022.	26 February 2024; BWF permitted eligible athletes to return as neutral athletes.	Not restored
Table Tennis (International Table Tennis Federation)	Russian and Belarusian players and officials were barred from ITTF and WTT events in 2022.	30 March 2023; the ITTF and WTT allowed eligible Russian and Belarusian players to return under strict neutrality conditions.	July 2026
Cycling (Union Cycliste Internationale)	Russian and Belarusian national teams and symbols were barred, while individual athletes could compete only under neutral conditions.	March 2022; individual riders were allowed to compete under neutral conditions.	UCI lifted restrictions on the participation of Belarusian athletes in June 2026; for Russian athletes, restrictions were lifted only for junior athletes, provided they competed in a neutral status.
Rowing (World Rowing)	Russian and Belarusian athletes and officials were excluded from World Rowing events in March 2022.	2023; World Rowing allowed eligible athletes to return as neutral individual athletes.	Not restored
Archery (World Archery)	Russian and Belarusian athletes, teams and officials were prohibited from international archery events in March 2022.	Not restored; World Archery stated in 2023 that a neutral return was unlikely unless eligibility procedures were completed by the Russian and Belarusian federations.	May 2026 for Belarusian athletes August 2026 for Russian athletes
Sailing (World Sailing)	Russian and Belarusian athletes, officials and teams were excluded from World Sailing events in March 2022.	July 2025; WS permitted eligible athletes to return as neutral athletes.	WS lifted restrictions on the participation of Belarusian athletes in June 2026; for Russian athletes, restrictions were lifted only for junior athletes.
Shooting (International Shooting Sport Federation)	Russian and Belarusian athletes were suspended from ISSF competitions in 2022.	April 2026; ISSF permitted Russian and Belarusian athletes to return as neutral athletes.	Not restored
Athletics (World Athletics)	Fully banned in 2022	Not restored	Not restored
Football (FIFA / UEFA)	Fully suspended in February 2022	Not restored	Not restored
Volleyball (FIVB / CEV)	Fully suspended in February 2022	Not restored	July 2026
Basketball (FIBA)	Fully suspended in February 2022	Not restored	Not restored
Handball (International Handball Federation)	Fully suspended in March 2022	Not restored	July 2026
Boxing (World Boxing)	Fully suspended in 2022	May 2026; WB permitted eligible athletes to return as neutral athletes.	July 2026
Modern Pentathlon (Union Internationale de Pentathlon Moderne)	Fully suspended in 2022	March 2023; UIPM permitted eligible athletes to return as neutral athletes.	July 2026
Motorsport (Fédération Internationale de l'Automobile)	Fully suspended in March 2022.	Russians and Belarusians could continue racing even when the ban was announced if they raced under a neutral flag	August 2026
Canoeing (Paddle Worldwide)	Fully suspended in March 2022.	2023; IFC permitted eligible athletes to return as neutral athletes.	January 2027

==== Winter Olympics ====
Sport / Federation	Initial status after 2022 invasion	Neutral participation restored	Full reinstatement under flag
Ski mountaineering (International Ski Mountaineering Federation)	Russian and Belarusian athletes were excluded from ISMF competitions following the IOC recommendation.	December 2024	Not restored
Figure skating (International Skating Union)	Fully suspended in 2022	Not restored	Not restored
Bobsleigh and Skeleton (International Bobsleigh and Skeleton Federation)	Russian and Belarusian athletes were suspended from IBSF competitions in 2022.	Not restored	Not restored
Ice hockey (IIHF)	Russian and Belarusian national and club teams were suspended from IIHF competitions in February 2022.	Not restored	IIHF stated in May 2026 that it will review the participation of Russia and Belarus on an event-by-event basis.
Biathlon (International Biathlon Union)	Fully suspended in March 2022.	December 2025; IBU permitted eligible athletes to return as neutral athletes.	Not restored

==== Others ====
Sport / Federation	Initial status after 2022 invasion	Neutral participation restored	Full reinstatement under flag
Chess (FIDE)	Russian and Belarusian teams were restricted from official FIDE team competitions after the invasion, while players could continue under the FIDE flag.	2022; individual players were allowed to compete under the FIDE flag.	Not restored for adult national teams; FIDE later restored full rights only for youth players, while adult teams remained under restrictions.
Dancing (World DanceSport Federation)	Fully suspended in March 2022.	January 2026; WDSF permitted eligible athletes to return as neutral athletes.	August 2026

== Legal analysis ==
According to Miguel Ángel Dávila, a lawyer and specialist in international and sports law, the sanctions can be seen as linked to Russia's breach of the Olympic Truce resolution adopted by the United Nations General Assembly in December 2021, which called on member states to refrain from hostilities during the Olympic and Paralympic Winter Games and thus provided a normative basis for the IOC to act after the invasion. Dávila argues that while some sanctions, particularly those adopted by the IOC, find legal support in the Olympic Charter, which empowers the IOC Executive Board and disciplinary bodies to impose measures in cases of violations of applicable rules, other federation actions (such as those by FIFA and UEFA) depend on broad interpretations of their governing statutes allowing urgent decisions by executive councils. Dávila contends that, although the sanctions clearly carry a political dimension, they are not entirely devoid of legal grounding because they relate to the violation of prior international commitments and existing regulatory frameworks within the sport system.

== Historical precedents ==
The exclusion of Russian sport following the 2022 invasion of Ukraine has drawn comparisons with earlier instances in which political conflicts affected international competition. The Olympic Games have previously been shaped by geopolitical crises: the 1916, 1940 and 1944 Games were cancelled due to the World Wars, while Germany and Japan were excluded from the 1948 Games because of their roles in World War II. South Africa was barred from Olympic participation during the apartheid era, and in 2020 Russia was sanctioned over a state-sponsored doping scheme, although individual athletes were allowed to compete under a neutral status.

The Olympic Games have also been subject to formal boycotts, most notably in 1980 and 1984, though these involved state-led refusals to participate rather than institutional suspensions imposed by governing bodies.

Beyond the Olympic context, sporting sanctions have occasionally followed international political decisions. In 1992, following United Nations Security Council Resolution 757, sports organizations implemented a boycott of the Federal Republic of Yugoslavia during the Yugoslav wars, affecting participation in European football competitions. In another politically sensitive case, Malaysia was stripped in 2019 of the right to host the World Para Swimming Championships after refusing to grant entry to Israeli athletes, and in 2021 the cancellation of the World Men's Team Squash Championship in Kuala Lumpur prompted the IOC to warn that host nations must guarantee non-discriminatory access for athletes.

Another example often cited in discussions of the Olympic Truce occurred in 2026, when airstrikes carried out by the United States and Israel against Iran on 28 February took place during the period covered by the United Nations–endorsed Olympic Truce for the Milan–Cortina Winter Olympic and Paralympic Games. The incident drew attention because Russia's invasion of Ukraine in February 2022 had likewise occurred during the Olympic–Paralympic period and was cited by the IOC as one of the factors behind the unprecedented sporting sanctions imposed on Russian and Belarusian athletes. Despite the 2026 strikes being widely described as a breach of the symbolic truce, the IOC did not consider punitive measures against the countries involved and reiterated that the Olympic Truce is a non-binding resolution and that the Olympic movement generally avoids direct involvement in geopolitical conflicts. Observers noted that the contrasting reactions highlighted the largely symbolic nature of the Olympic Truce and the discretionary character of sanctions within international sport governance.

== See also ==
- International sanctions during the Russian invasion of Ukraine
- International sanctions during the Russo-Ukrainian war
- Non-government reactions to the Russian invasion of Ukraine
- 1980 Summer Olympics boycott
- Sporting boycott of South Africa during the apartheid era
- Boycotts of Israel in sports
