= The Truce (disambiguation) =

The Truce (La Tregua) is an autobiographical book by Primo Levi.

The Truce may also refer to:

- The Truce (1974 film), a film based on Benedetti's novel
- The Truce (1997 film), an adaptation of Primo Levi's book
- La tregua, a 1960 novel by Mario Benedetti

== See also ==
- Truce (disambiguation)
