= Ekecheiria =

Personification in Greek mythology

In Greek mythology, Ekecheiria, Ekekheiria, or Ecechiria (/ɛsɪˈkaɪri.ə/; Ancient Greek: Ἐκεχειρία means 'armistice, truce') is a personification associated with Zeus. A statue depicting Ekecheiria placing a crown atop the head of Iphitos was installed beside the Temple of Zeus at Olympia in 460 BC.

The term ekecheiria refers to the ancient Olympic truce. The ancient Greeks hosted Olympiads for almost 600 years, and whenever the games were announced, Truce Heralds from Olympia went to all participating nations and city states to call for the laying down of arms. The truce was considered sacred, and only two violations are found in the records: Soldiers of Philip of Macedon were convicted of robbing travellers on their way to the games, leading to the Macedonian king being fined, and a King of Sparta was subject to a similar fine. Pierre de Coubertin, the father of the modern Olympic Games, tried to invoke Ekecheiria during World War I in order to continue with the 1916 Games in Berlin. However, he was unsuccessful, and the games were cancelled.
