= Olympic Truce =

Truce promoted during the Olympic Games

Olympic Truce logo

The Olympic Truce is a tradition originating from ancient Greece that dates back to 776 BC. A "truce" (from Ancient Greek ἐκεχειρία (ékécheiria) 'laying down of arms') was announced before and during the Olympic Games to ensure the host city state (Elis) was not attacked and athletes and spectators could travel safely to the Games and peacefully return to their respective countries. King Iphitos of Elis, Lycurgus of Sparta and Kleosthenes of Pisa made this treaty which remained respected by all ancient Greeks as international law. By this law the territories of Elis and Olympia were made sacrosanct so that no army or armed men could enter there, and all wars must stop for the month of the games (later extended to 3 months) to allow athletes and followers to travel and take part. The treaty was recorded by the Eleians on a bronze disc which was kept in the Temple of Hera at Olympia. It was respected for centuries and violations were punished by the Olympic Council with heavy fines and other penalties.

In 1992, the International Olympic Committee (IOC) renewed this tradition by calling upon all nations to observe the Truce during the modern Games. The non-binding Truce was revived by United Nations Resolution 48/11 of 25 October 1993, as well by the United Nations Millennium Declaration relating to the world peace and security. Every two years since the 1993 resolution, the United Nations has adopted, with varying levels of consensus, a resolution reaffirming the ideals of the Olympic Truce.

In 1996, the Athens Bid Committee committed to revive the Olympic Truce and promoting it to the world through the Olympic flame relay at the 2004 Summer Olympics. Three years later, the IOC announced the establishment of the International Olympic Truce Foundation and the International Olympic Truce Centre in cooperation with Greece. The vision was to protect the interests of athletes and sport, and to promote peaceful principles in the modern day. Each host city was encouraged to embrace the meaning and spirit of the Olympic Truce in the planning and staging of the Games.

The modern Olympic Truce starts one week before the main opening ceremony of the Olympic Games and ends one week after the closing ceremony of the Paralympic Games. The non-binding Truce has been violated multiple times in the modern history of the Games. In 2008, Russia started its war in Georgia, annexed Crimea from Ukraine in 2014, and launched a full-scale invasion of Ukraine in 2022. This violation was a contributing factor to Russian and Belarusian athletes being banned from the 2022 Winter Paralympics, and the subsequent suspension of most Russian and Belarusian athletes from the 2024 Summer Olympics and 2026 Winter Olympics. In 2026, Israel and the United States launched airstrikes on Iran; this has led to no sporting sanctions or boycotts.

== Goals ==
Through this global and symbolic concept, the goal of the Olympic Truce movement is to:

- Mobilize youth for the promotion of the Olympic ideals
- Use sport to establish contacts between communities in conflict
- Offer humanitarian support in countries at war
- Create a window of opportunities for dialogue and reconciliation

== Initiatives ==
- 1994 Lillehammer Winter Games: the former Federal Republic of Yugoslavia was allowed to participate in the Games of the XXV Olympiad in Barcelona and the XVII Olympic Winter Games in Lillehammer despite ongoing wars. A delegation from the International Olympic Committee (IOC) visited Sarajevo in 1994 to extend its solidarity to the city that had organized the XIV Olympic Winter Games in 1984.
- 1998 Nagano Winter Games: During a time when tension in the Persian Gulf region was high, United Nations Secretary General Kofi Annan intervened to seek a diplomatic resolution to the crisis in Iraq. In a release from the International Olympic Committee, the Secretary General was quoted, "I call upon all nations to observe the Olympic truce."
- 2000 Sydney Summer Games: During the Opening Ceremony, South and North Korean delegations walked in the stadium together, under the same flag. It was the first Olympic Games event where the two divided countries walked side by side.
- 2004 Athens Summer Games: The Olympic Truce was promoted through Olympic Flame Relay events. The UN supported the IOC in asking the nations of the world to stop all wars for 16 days during the Games.
- 2006 Turin Winter Games: During the games, athletes and officials showed support for the Olympic Truce by signing one of the three walls situated in the three Olympic Villages (Turin, Sestriere and Bardonecchia).
- 2010 Vancouver Winter Games: Truce projects were rooted in an open invitation for people to "Make Your Peace" which asked individuals to create everyday peace at home, schools, work, and in the community. Projects included: delivering Olympic Spirit Boxes filled with hockey, soccer, lacrosse, baseball, and basketball equipment to 20 Aboriginal communities in Northern Canada; an Olympic Truce Youth Dialogue with Canada's Governor General; and an art installation titled "Room to Make your Peace".
- 2012 London Summer Games: From 22 April 2011 to 15 February 2012, Lord Michael Bates walked over 3,000 miles from Olympia to London to highlight the opportunity to bring the Olympic Truce into reality during the games. With the Walk for Truce, Lord Bates was successful in securing pledges from a number of governments to both sign and implement the Truce, supported on his journey by the British Foreign Office.

== Logo ==
The official Olympic Truce logo is a graphic with three elements: a dove, flames, and the Olympic rings. The meaning behind the logo is as follows:

The Olympic Truce is symbolized by the dove of peace with the traditional Olympic flame in the background. In a world that is plagued by wars and animosity, the peace-dove symbol represents one of the IOC's ideals to build a peaceful and better world through sport and the Olympic ideal. The Olympic flame has brought warm friendship to all the people of the world through sharing and global togetherness. In the symbol, the flame is made up of colourful effervescent elements, reminiscent of festivities experienced in the celebration of the human spirit. These elements represent people of all races coming together for the observance of the Truce.

== United Nations support ==
Today the Olympic Truce has become an expression of mankind's desire to build a world based on the rules of fair competition, peace, humanity and reconciliation.

— United Nations

The United Nations is in support of the Olympic Truce and adopts a resolution called "Building a peaceful and better world through sport and the Olympic ideal" prior to each Summer and Winter Olympic Games. UN member states are asked to observe the Olympic Truce, and work towards the settlement of international disagreements by peaceful and diplomatic means. The United Kingdom was the first ever nation to get all 193 UN member states to sign the Olympic Truce resolution for the 2012 Olympic Games.

UN support is mainly shown through the resolution. It is also shown by the Solemn Appeals for Truce made by the UN Secretary General and the President of the General Assembly shortly before the Summer Olympic and Winter Olympic Games. The lead office within the UN system is The United Nations Office on Sport for Development and Peace (UNOSDP). The current UN Special Adviser on Sport for Development and Peace is Wilfried Lemke from Bremen, Germany. UNOSDP is situated at the UN Office at Geneva plus a liaison office at UN HQ in New York.

On 17 October 2011, the United Nations General Assembly passed a resolution, entitled "Sport for Peace and Development: Building a Peaceful and Better World through Sport and the Olympic Ideal", for member states to observe the Olympic Truce, individually and collectively. The resolution, introduced by LOCOG chairman Sebastian Coe, passed without a vote.

The United Nations website recognizes the truce as "the cornerstone of the Olympic Games in ancient times" and the "longest lasting peace accord in history".

In 2021, twenty countries (including Turkey, India, Japan, Australia, Canada, the United States, and the United Kingdom) refused to sign the Olympic Truce for the 2022 Winter Olympics in Beijing. Australia and the United States considered this part of their diplomatic boycotts due to the host nation China's human rights abuses and the Uyghur genocide.

== United Nations resolutions and legal status ==
Since 1993, the United Nations General Assembly has adopted resolutions encouraging member states to observe the Olympic Truce. These resolutions are generally considered every two years, ahead of the Summer or Winter Olympic Games. They are introduced by member states and may be adopted by consensus, meaning that no formal vote is required when there are no objections to the proposed text.

The resolutions are recommendations rather than legally binding obligations. They encourage governments to suspend hostilities and facilitate the safe participation of athletes and officials, but do not establish an enforceable ceasefire. Responsibility for implementing their recommendations rests with individual member states.

On 19 November 2025, the General Assembly adopted Resolution 80/8, calling for the observance of the Olympic Truce during the 2026 Winter Olympics and 2026 Winter Paralympics in Italy. The resolution encouraged states to observe the truce from seven days before the Olympic Games until seven days after the conclusion of the Paralympic Games.

== Violations ==
Historical failures to observe the Olympic Truce include:

- 2008: Russo-Georgian War, which lasted from 1–16 August and ran through the opening ceremony of the 2008 Summer Olympics.
- 2014: Russian annexation of Crimea, which took place on 27 February, in the period between the closing of the Winter Olympics and the opening of the Winter Paralympics.
  - In response, the United States and United Kingdom diplomatically boycotted the 2014 Winter Paralympics, and the entire Ukrainian delegation except for their flagbearer boycotted the opening ceremony.
- 2022: Russian invasion of Ukraine, which began on 24 February, in the period between the closing of the Winter Olympics and the opening of the Winter Paralympics.
  - In response, Russia and Belarus (which provided military support) were banned from the 2022 Winter Paralympics. Other sanctions and boycotts were also put in place.
- 2024: Russian invasion of Ukraine, which continued on from two years prior, and Gaza war, which began nine months prior.
  - Violations of the truce period continued when it began on 19 July. Russian and Belarusian athletes were not allowed to compete under their own flags in the 2024 Summer Olympics, and calls were made to have Israel excluded from the 2024 Olympics. The head of the Palestine Olympic Committee and French left-wing lawmakers accused the IOC of having a double standard for failing to take action against Israel.
- 2026: Iran war, which began on 28 February, in the period between the closing of the Winter Olympics and the opening of the Winter Paralympics.
  - Violations of the truce occurred when Israel and the United States launched airstrikes against Iran on 28 February, culminating in the assassination of Ali Khamenei.

== See also ==
- Ancient Olympic Games
- The Lexus and the Olive Tree
- International sporting sanctions during the Russian invasion of Ukraine
