= 2020 Summer Olympics cauldron =

Artwork in Tokyo by Oki Sato for the Games of the 32nd Olympiad

2020 Summer Olympics and Paralympics Cauldron
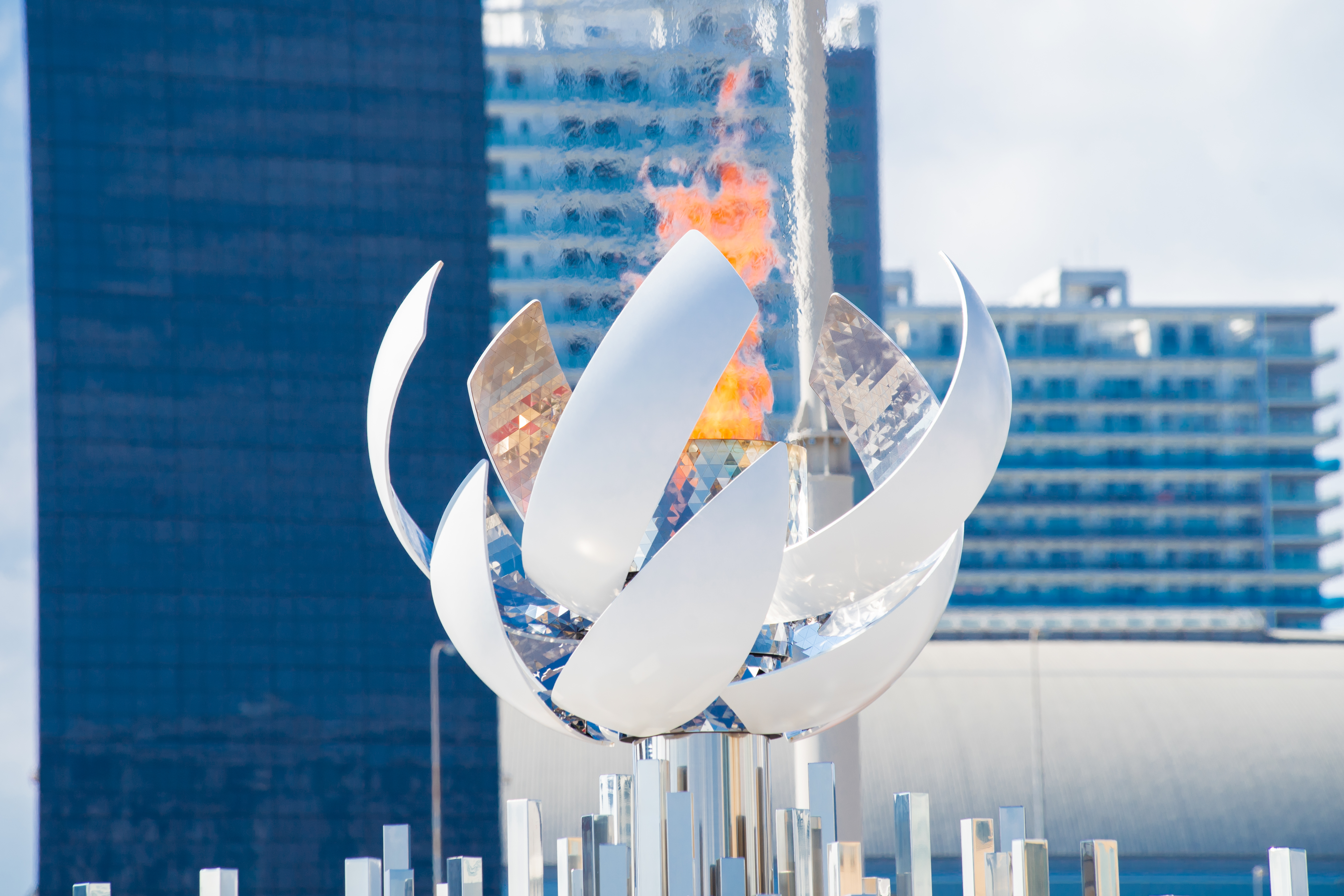
- 2020 Summer Olympics and Paralympics Cauldron
- Artist: Oki Sato
- Year: 2020 – 2021
- Location: Tokyo, Japan; 35°37′56″N 139°47′27″E

The 2020 Summer Olympics and Paralympics cauldron was made for the 2020 Summer Olympics and 2020 Summer Paralympics in Tokyo, Japan.

== Design ==
The cauldron was designed by Canadian-Japanese designer Oki Sato, who attended Waseda University, the same university as Yoshinori Sakai, the cauldron-lighter in 1964. It initially took the form of a sphere; its panels then "bloomed" to accept the torch, and was lit by tennis player Naomi Osaka in the Olympics opening ceremony, and by Yui Kamiji, Karin Morisaki and Shunsuke Uchida in the Paralympics opening ceremony. Sato explained that the design "expresses not only the sun itself, but also the energy and vitality that can be obtained from it, such as plants sprouting, flowers blooming, and hands opening wide toward the sky." The steps to reach the cauldron, symbolising Mount Fuji, were "designed to evoke the image of a blooming sakura flower."

Similarly to 2010 and 2016, one instance of the cauldron was present inside Japan National Stadium during the opening and closing ceremonies, and a permanent, public cauldron was lit outside of the stadium by badminton player Ayaka Takahashi at Tokyo's new waterfront on Ariake West Canal.

The cauldron's flame was the first at the Olympics to burn hydrogen as a fuel. The hydrogen was produced via the electrolysis of water using solar power produced at a plant in the Fukushima Prefecture. Hydrogen produced by this process is known as green hydrogen. The hydrogen burns with an invisible, colourless flame unlike propane, which has is traditionally used as a fuel in previous Olympic flames. In order to create a yellow and visible flame, sodium carbonate is sprayed.
