= Vancouver Convention Centre =

Convention centre in Vancouver, British Columbia, Canada

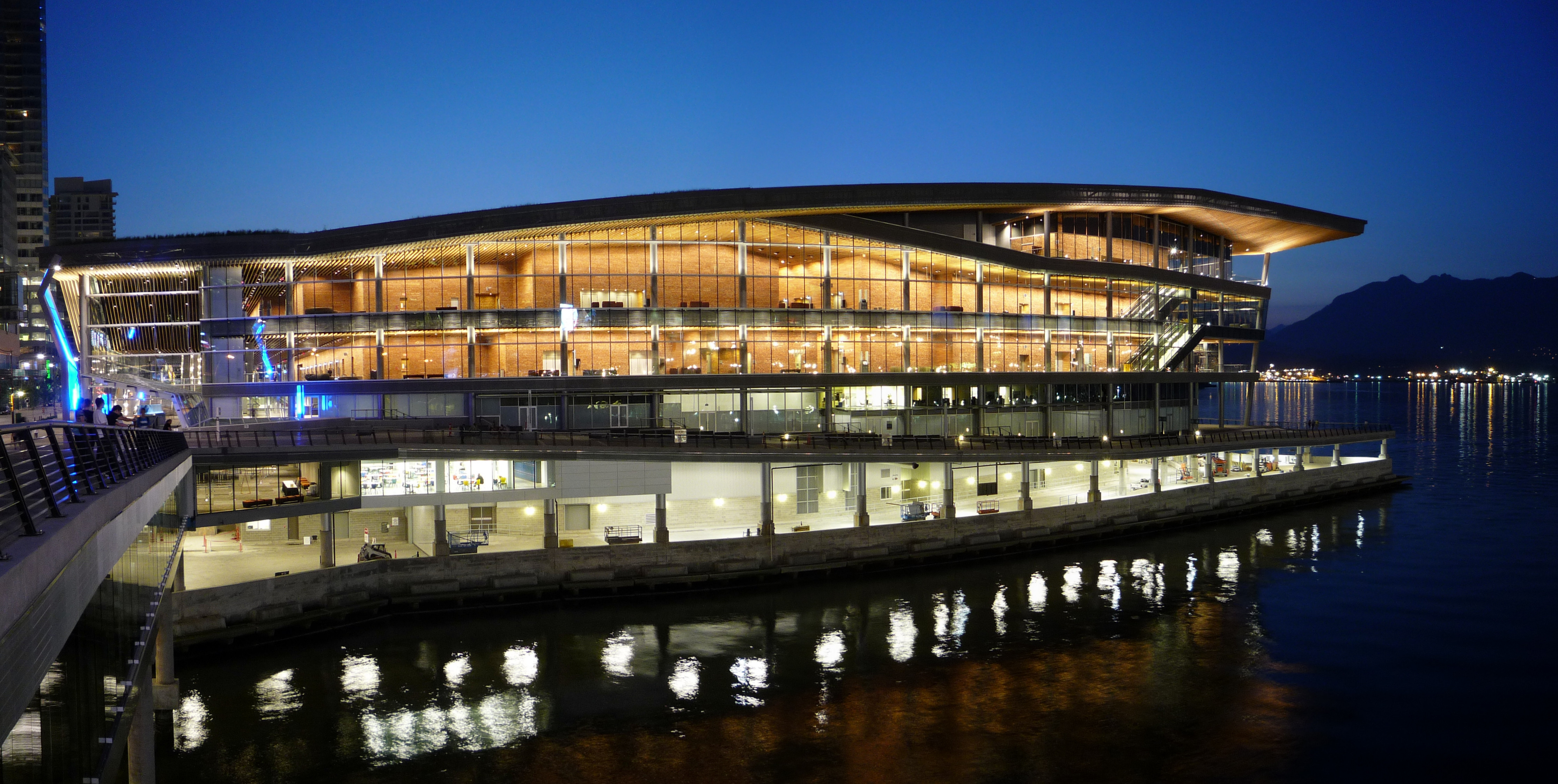
- Interactive map of Vancouver Convention Centre
- Former names: Vancouver Convention and Exhibition Centre
- Address: 1055 Canada Place
- Location: Vancouver, British Columbia
- Coordinates: 49.289167°N 123.1137972°W
- Owner: BC Pavilion
- Public transit: Waterfront

Construction
- Opened: 1986
- Expanded: 2009

Website
- www.vancouverconventioncentre.com

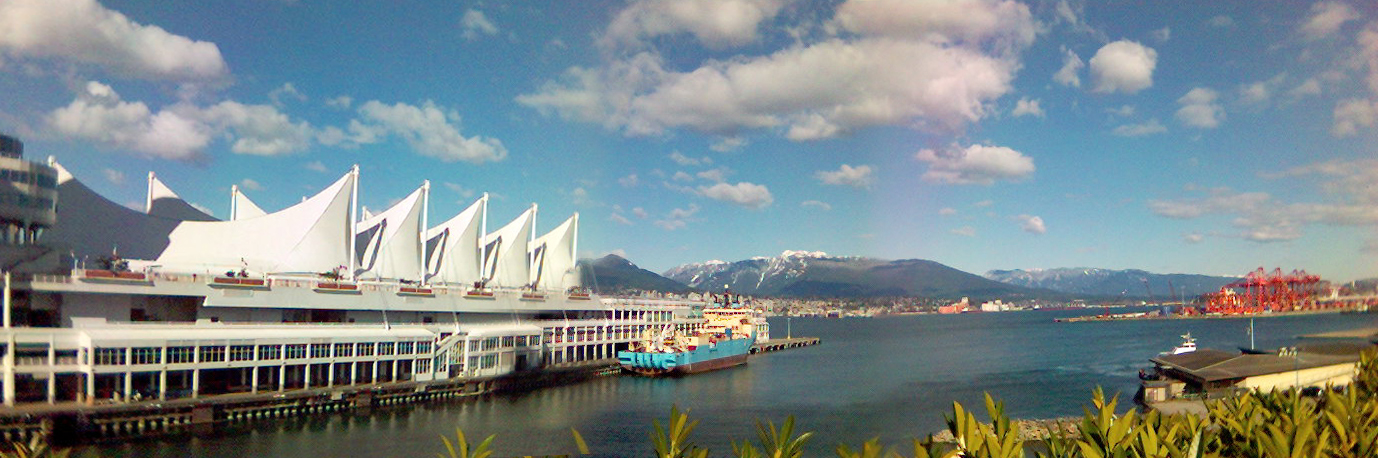
Canada Place, which houses the East Building of the convention centre

The Vancouver Convention Centre (formerly known as the Vancouver Convention & Exhibition Centre, or VCEC) is a convention centre in Vancouver, British Columbia, Canada; it is one of Canada's largest convention centres. With the opening of the new West Building in 2009, it now has 43,340 square metres (466,500 sq ft) of meeting space. It is owned by the British Columbia Pavilion Corporation, a Crown corporation owned by the government of British Columbia. The Centre served as the main press centre and International Broadcast Centre for the 2010 Winter Olympics.

== East Building ==
The East Building is located in Canada Place, which it shares with a cruise ship terminal, and the Pan Pacific hotel. It has 12,400 m^{2} (133,000 sq ft) of space, including a 8,500 m^{2} (91,000 sq ft), column-free, dividable exhibition hall, 20 meeting rooms, and a ballroom.

The East Building served as the venue for a series of religious gatherings which hosted Aga Khan, 49th Imam of Ismaili Muslims, on August 24, 25, 26, 1992 as well as June 10, 2005.

The East Building also served as the main press centre for the 2010 Winter Olympics.

== West Building ==
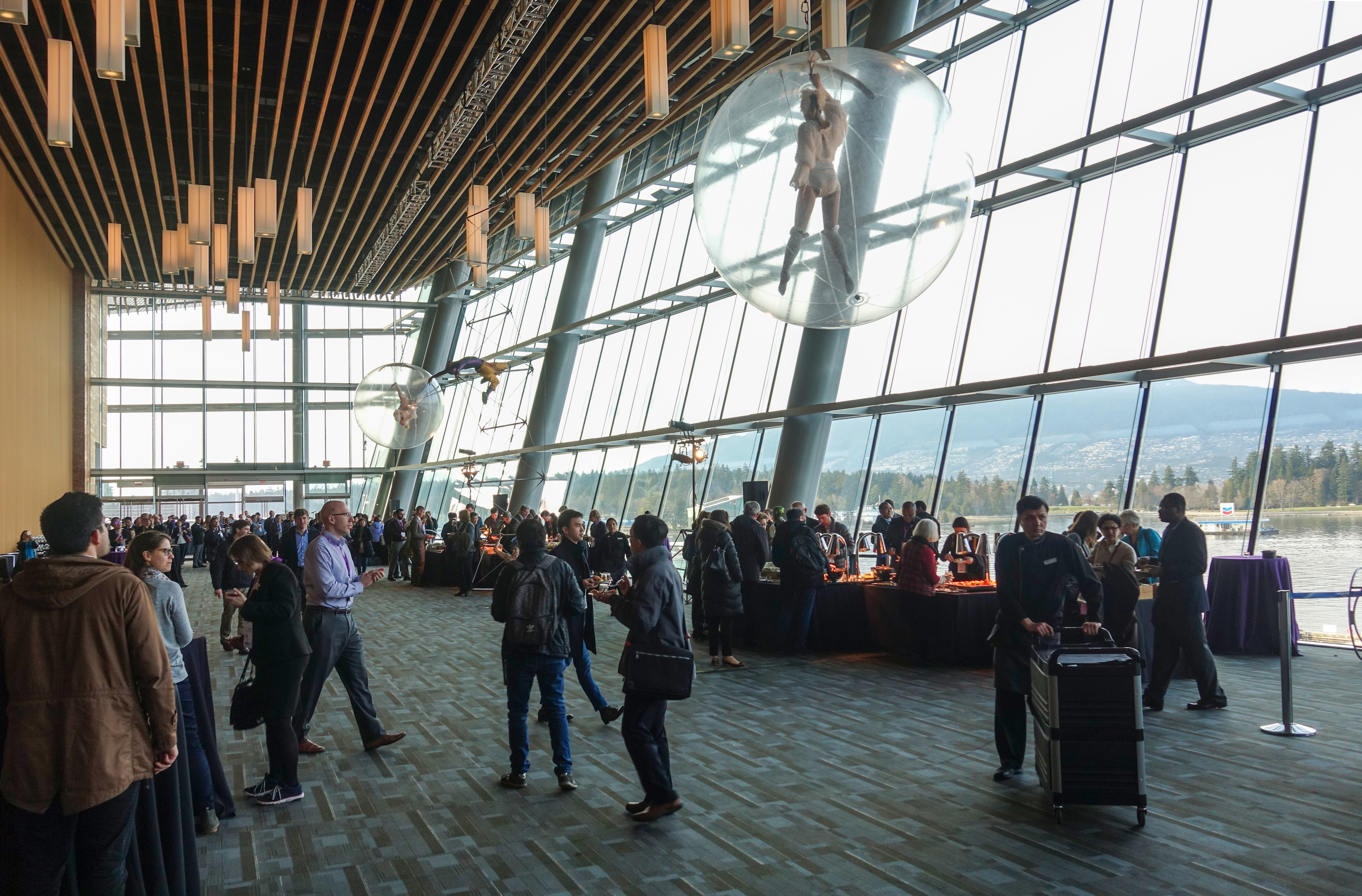
West Building interior

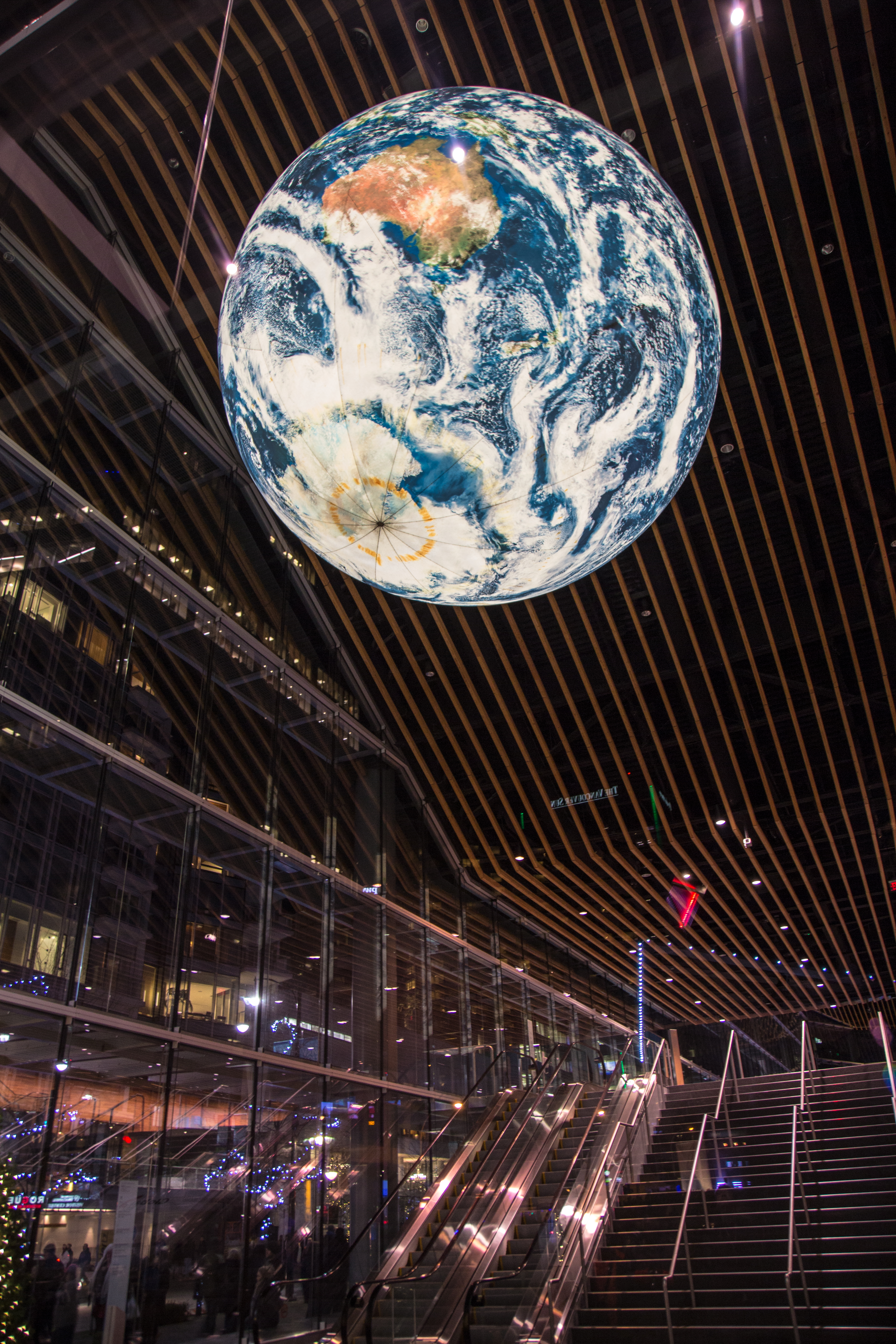
West Building entrance

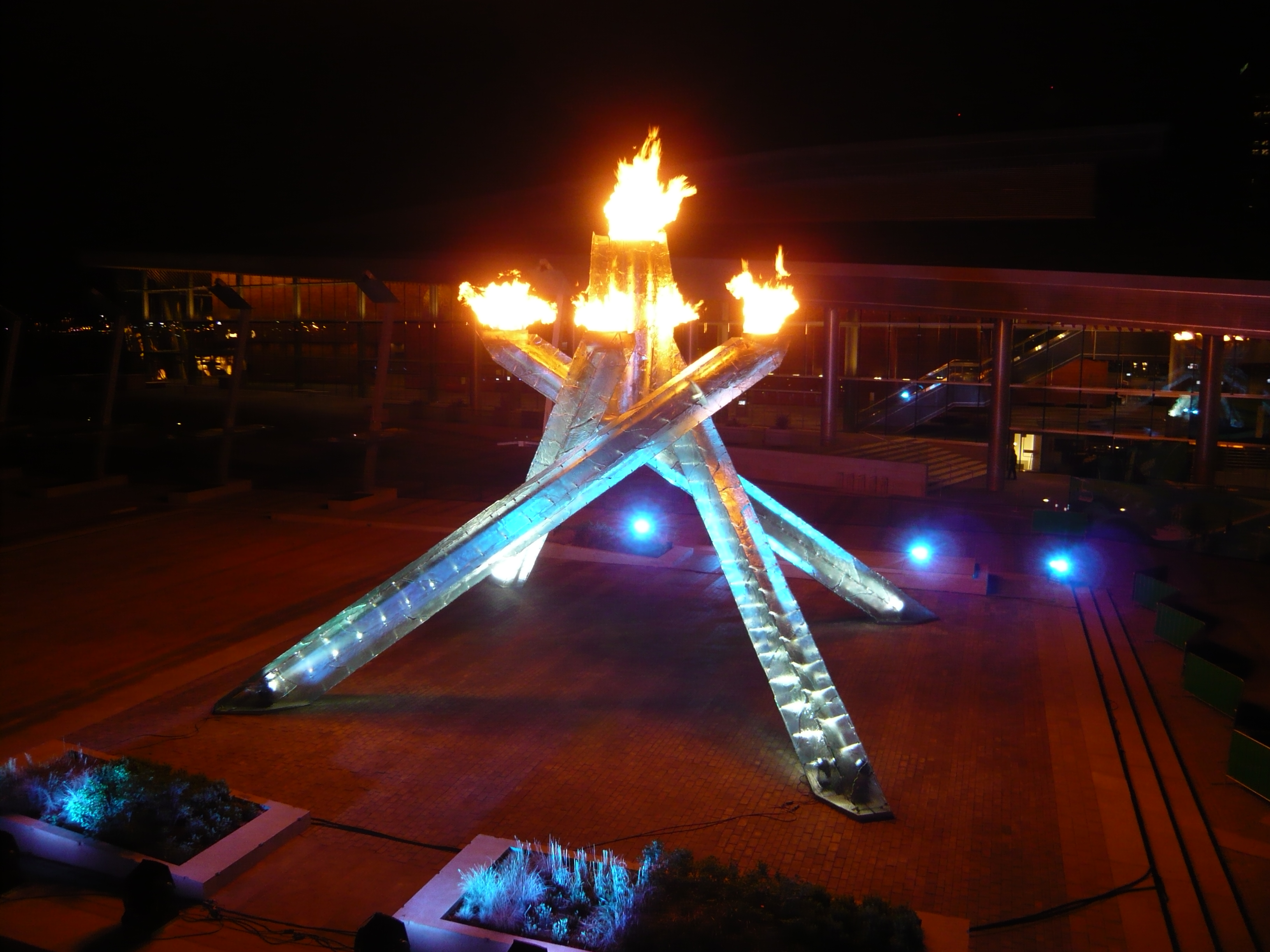
Olympic Cauldron at Jack Poole Plaza

The West Building is directly adjacent to Canada Place and consists of 110,000 m^{2} (1,200,000 sq ft) total interior space including 20,490 m^{2} (220,500 sq ft) of convention space, 8,400 m^{2} (90,000 sq ft) of retail space along a public waterfront promenade, and 450 parking stalls. Surrounding the building are 37,000 m^{2} (400,000 sq ft) of walkways, bikeways, public open space and plazas, for a total project area of 5.7 hectares (14 acres) of land and 3.2 hectares (8 acres) over water. The project also supplies infrastructure for future water based developments including an expanded marina, a float plane terminal, and water-based retail opportunities. The design architect for the expansion is LMN Architects of Seattle, in association with Vancouver firms MCM Architects and DA Architects + Planners. Morrison Hershfield ensured quality assurance and conducted enhanced field review during construction of all building envelope components including innovative curtain wall glazing and green roof. On February 9, 2010, the building was certified LEED Platinum by the Canada Green Building Council.

The West Building opened to the public on April 4, 2009, and had a final cost of $883,000,000 CAD (exclusive of land). The building hosted the International Broadcast Centre for the 2010 Winter Olympics and 2010 Winter Paralympics. Connecting to the centre is the Fairmont Pacific Rim hotel.

Adjacent to the West building is the "Jack Poole Plaza" (formerly known as Thurlow Plaza), in honour of Jack Poole, who died of pancreatic cancer in 2009. He was responsible for securing the bid of the 2010 Winter Olympics and 2010 Winter Paralympics for Vancouver.

=== Sustainability ===
The new West Building expansion is certified Leadership in Energy and Environmental Design Platinum (LEED) and is designated a PowerSmart Convention Centre by BC Hydro. It was awarded a "Go Green" certificate from the Building Owners and Managers Association (BOMA) for industry-approved, environmental best practices in building management. The living roof, seawater heating and cooling, on-site water treatment and fish habitat built into the foundation of the West Building make it one of the greenest convention centres in the world. The Centre recycles an average of 180,000 kilograms of materials annually, nearly half of the total volume of waste generated. It avoids canned goods, disposable utensils and dishes, and donates leftover food to local charities.

The 2.6-hectare (6.5-acre) green roof is the largest in Canada and the largest non-industrial green roof in North America. It emulates a Gulf Island coastal grassland beachfront, with a slope of 3 to 56 per cent incline, suited to drought conditions as well as very wet conditions. Zigzag patterns on the roof are runnels which act like natural streams and separate the roof into distinct drainage basins. The roof was constructed with a metal base, a gypsum-core fibreglass mat, capillary waterproofing and root inhibitor, and 10 cm (3.9 in) of extruded insulation with a cloth filter. Atop this is 5 million kilograms (11 million pounds) of growth medium consisting of 70% volcanic rock, 25% organic matter (composted wood and garden waste), and 5% sand. When fully saturated with water, the roof has a mass of 193 kg/m^{2} (39.6 lbs/sqft). When moisture sensors report less than 15% saturation of the growth medium, drip irrigation systems are activated, dispersing collected rainwater or treated greywater from the facility. The roof is estimated to reduce summer heat gain by 95% and winter heat loss by 25%. The roof is a natural habitat for birds (particularly ground-nesting birds), insects and small mammals. There are four hives of bees which pollinate the flowering plants and provide honey for the public plaza restaurant. The landscape functionally connects to nearby Stanley Park via a corridor of waterfront parks.

All wastewater from washrooms, retail, and restaurant activities in the building is reclaimed and recycled for use in toilet and urinal flushing, and green roof irrigation. The treatment facility uses a membrane bioreactor process, manufactured and supplied by GE/Zenon, consisting of two 2-zone (anoxic/oxic) bioreactor tanks (with internal recycle) and an ultra-filtration (hollow-fibre) membrane tank, followed by a chlorine contact tank that serves to remove colour and disinfect the reclaimed water. The treatment system is designed for an average daily flow of 75 cubic metres (20,000 US gal; 16,000 imp gal) per day, and maximum flows of up to 150 cubic metres (40,000 US gal; 33,000 imp gal) per day. With the City of Vancouver 2012 commercial metered water and sewer rates at $2.803 and $1.754, respectively, the convention centre can save over $21,000 per month in utility fees through water reuse. One of the biggest operating challenges when the facility first started up was the ability to maintain the treatment plant bacteria in a healthy condition during lengthy periods (e.g. late December through mid-January) with limited wastewater to feed the treatment plant due to limited convention activity and concurrent wastewater generation within the building; however, once the restaurants in the building were established this challenge was resolved.

The building's heating and cooling system feeds through the deep water of the harbor, using it as a constant temperature base to reduce the amount of energy used for heating and cooling.

An artificial reef was built into the building's foundations, providing 61 m (200 ft) of shoreline and 460 m (1,500 ft) of marine habitat for barnacles, mussels, seaweed, starfish, crabs and fish. The five-tier structure was constructed from 76 concrete frames weighing 36,000 kg (79,000 lb) each. It supports a historic salmon migration path, a kelp forest characteristic of the natural shoreline, and a diversity of harbor fauna. A tidal ecosystem zone flushes daily and feeds the reef.

The site of the expansion is a former marine and rail industrial area, most of which was covered in impervious surfaces and contaminated. The expansion led to a decrease in the site's impervious surfaces by almost 30 percent, mitigating total suspended solids and phosphorus content from stormwater and reducing the site's heat-island contribution.

== Awards ==
In 2002, and again in 2008, the VCEC was awarded the International Association of Congress Centres (AIPC) "Apex Award" for the "World's Best Congress Centre". In April 2010, the West Building expansion received an Award of Excellence from the Urban Land Institute. It has also received multiple awards from the AIA Seattle chapter.
