= The Amazing Race 39 =

Season of television series

- Season 39
- Promotional poster featuring host Phil Keoghan
- Presented by: Phil Keoghan
- No. of teams: 13
- No. of legs: 12
- Distance traveled: 25,000 mi (40,000 km)
- No. of episodes: 9

Release
- Original network: CBS
- Original release: September 30, 2026 – present

Additional information
- Filming dates: September 22 – October 17, 2025

Series chronology
- ← Previous; Season 38

The Amazing Race 39 is the thirty-ninth season of the American reality competition show The Amazing Race. Hosted by Phil Keoghan, it features thirteen teams of two, each with a pre-existing relationship, competing in a race around the world to win US$1,000,000. Filming took place from September 22 to October 17, 2025. This season visited five continents and nine countries, traveling approximately 25,000 miles (40,000 km) during twelve legs. Starting in Vancouver, racers traveled through Canada, Spain, Morocco, Albania, Sri Lanka, Laos, Australia, and New Zealand, before returning to the United States and finishing in Honolulu. New elements introduced this season include every team receiving an Express Pass at the start of the race, the Roadside Assistance, and a leg with two Driver's Seats. Elements of the show that returned for this season include an automatic U-Turn penalty for a last team. The season premiered on CBS on September 30, 2026, and is set to conclude on December 9, 2026.

== Format ==
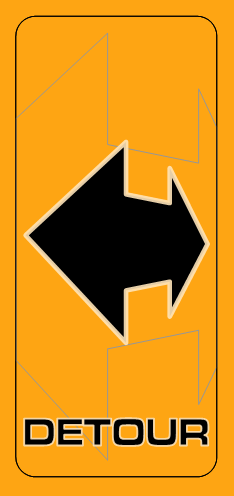
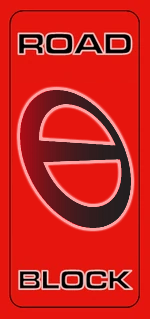
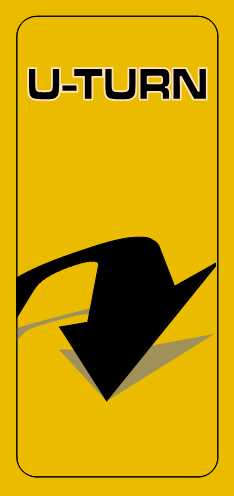
The clues which contestants receive during the course of the race generally fall into four categories: Route Info, Detour, Roadblock, and U-Turn.

The Amazing Race is a reality television show created by Bertram van Munster and Elise Doganieri, and hosted by Phil Keoghan. The series follows teams of two competing in a race around the world. Each leg of the race requires teams to deduce clues, navigate foreign environments, interact with locals, perform physical and mental challenges, and travel on a limited budget provided by the show. At each stop during the leg, teams receive clues inside sealed envelopes, which fall into one of these categories:

- Route Info: These are simple instructions that teams must follow before they can receive their next clue.
- Detour: A Detour is a choice between two tasks. Teams may choose either task and switch tasks if they find one option too difficult. There is usually one Detour present on each leg.
- Roadblock: A Roadblock is a task that only one team member can complete. Teams must choose which member will complete the task based on a brief clue they receive before fully learning the details of the task. There is usually one Roadblock present on each leg.
- Intersection: An Intersection requires two teams to work together until otherwise instructed.
- U-Turn: The U-Turn allows teams to force another team to complete both options of the Detour before they can continue the race.
- Scramble: A Scramble allows teams to complete a set of three tasks in any order that they choose. At the end of each task, teams receive one of three clue puzzle pieces that reveal their next destination after they are combined.
- Driver's Seat: A Driver's Seat allows one team to determine the work requirements for every team during a designated task.

Most teams who arrive last at the Pit Stop of each leg are progressively eliminated, while the first team to arrive at the finish line in the final episode wins the grand prize of US$1,000,000.

== Contestants ==
Riley Tejcek

Ali Krieger

Joanna Lohman

The cast was officially announced on August 12, 2026.

Contestants	Age	Relationship	Hometown	Status
Zach Johnson	30	Brothers	Dallas, Texas	Eliminated 1st (in Vancouver, Canada)
Nate Johnson	27	Brothers	Dallas, Texas	Eliminated 1st (in Vancouver, Canada)
Katie Schultz	26	Sisters	Murray, Kentucky	Eliminated 2nd (in Madrid, Spain)
Charlotte Schultz	20	Sisters	Murray, Kentucky	Eliminated 2nd (in Madrid, Spain)
Jody Rebhun	44	Best Friends/Moms	Branford, Connecticut	Eliminated 3rd (in Marrakesh, Morocco)
Jenn Naso	44	Best Friends/Moms	Larchmont, New York	Eliminated 3rd (in Marrakesh, Morocco)
Cody Langlois	35	Siblings	Los Angeles, California	Eliminated 4th (in Marrakesh, Morocco)
Jaime Tribo	33	Siblings	Tinley Park, Illinois	Eliminated 4th (in Marrakesh, Morocco)
Dafina Dunmore	52	Sisters/Best Friends	Chicago, Illinois	Eliminated 5th (in Tirana, Albania)
Saran Dunmore	51	Sisters/Best Friends	Chicago, Illinois	Eliminated 5th (in Tirana, Albania)
Doug Matter	73	Grandfather & Grandson	San Diego, California	Eliminated 6th (in Colombo, Sri Lanka)
Dylan Matter	19	Grandfather & Grandson	San Diego, California	Eliminated 6th (in Colombo, Sri Lanka)
Michelle Rozalski Patterson	31	Married Parents	Rutherford, New Jersey	Eliminated 7th (in Vientiane, Laos)
Matt Patterson	36	Married Parents	Rutherford, New Jersey	Eliminated 7th (in Vientiane, Laos)
Ann-Marie Tejcek	56	Mother & Daughter	Carmel, Indiana	Eliminated 8th (in Vang Vieng, Laos)
Riley Tejcek	29	Mother & Daughter	San Diego, California	Eliminated 8th (in Vang Vieng, Laos)
Ali Krieger	42	Pro Athletes/Moms	Montclair, New Jersey	Participating
Joanna Lohman	44	Pro Athletes/Moms	Silver Spring, Maryland	Participating
Anuar Tager	58	Father & Daughter	Houston, Texas	Participating
Andrea Tager Ballesca	25	Father & Daughter	Houston, Texas	Participating
Conner Wilson	27	Childhood Friends	Loomis, California	Participating
Garrett McGuire	27	Childhood Friends	Rocklin, California	Participating
Daisha Wilks	28	Dating	Flat Rock, Alabama	Participating
Dalton Hamby	27	Dating	Jacksonville, Alabama	Participating
Erin Taylor	28	Married	Fort Lauderdale, Florida	Participating
Javi Vintimilla	30	Married	Fort Lauderdale, Florida	Participating

== Contestant summary ==
The following teams are listed with their placements in each leg. Placements are listed in finishing order.

- A red placement with a dagger (†) indicates that the team was eliminated.
- An underlined blue placement with a double-dagger (‡) indicates that the team was the last to arrive at a Pit Stop in a non-elimination leg.
- A brown ⊃ indicates that the team used the U-Turn and a brown ⊂ indicates the team on the receiving end of the U-Turn.
- A purple ε indicates that the team used an Express Pass on that leg to bypass one of their tasks.
- A green α indicates that the team used a Roadside Assistance during a Roadblock.
- A violet + indicates that teams encountered an Intersection.

Team placement (by leg)
Team	1	2	3	4	5	6+ (Note: This leg featured an Intersection. The combined teams were, in order of formation: Michelle & Matt and Daisha & Dalton; Conner & Garrett and Anuar & Andrea; Ann-Marie & Riley and Ali & Joanna; and Doug & Dylan and Erin & Javi.)	7	8	9	10	11	12
Daisha & Dalton	12th	6thɛ (Note: This team used their Express Pass to bypass one of the tasks on this leg.)	9th	4th	2nd	2nd	7th⊂	4th⊂	1st			
Erin & Javi	1stɛ	7th	8th	3rd	8th	5th	6th	2nd⊃	2nd			
Conner & Garrett	2nd	9th	4th	5th	3rd	3rdɛ	4th	3rd	3rd			
Ali & Joanna	10th	1st	3rd	8th	5thɛ	7th	1st	5th	4th			
Anuar & Andrea	6th	8th	2ndɛ	2nd	7th	4th	2nd	6th	5th			
Ann-Marie & Riley	7th	4th	1stɛ	7th	4th	6th	5th	1st⊃	6th†			
Michelle & Matt	3rd	2nd	6th	1st	1st	1stɛ	3rd⊂	7th†⊂				
Doug & Dylan	4thɛ	10th	10th	9th	6th	8th‡	8th†⊂					
Dafina & Saran	9thɛ	11th	7th	6thα (Note: Dafina & Saran used their Roadside Assistance during this leg's Roadblock.)	9th†							
Cody & Jaime	11th	3rdɛ	5th	10th†								
Jody & Jenn	8th	5thɛ	11th†									
Katie & Charlotte	5th	12th†										
Zach & Nate	13th†											

== Race summary ==
The route of The Amazing Race 39.

Destinations	Air travel Rail travel Water travel Bus travel Helicopter travel Bicycle travel Gondola travel
Route Markers	Detour Roadblock Intersection Express Pass U-Turn; Roadside Assistance Scramble Driver's Seat Pit Stop

=== Leg 1 (Canada) ===
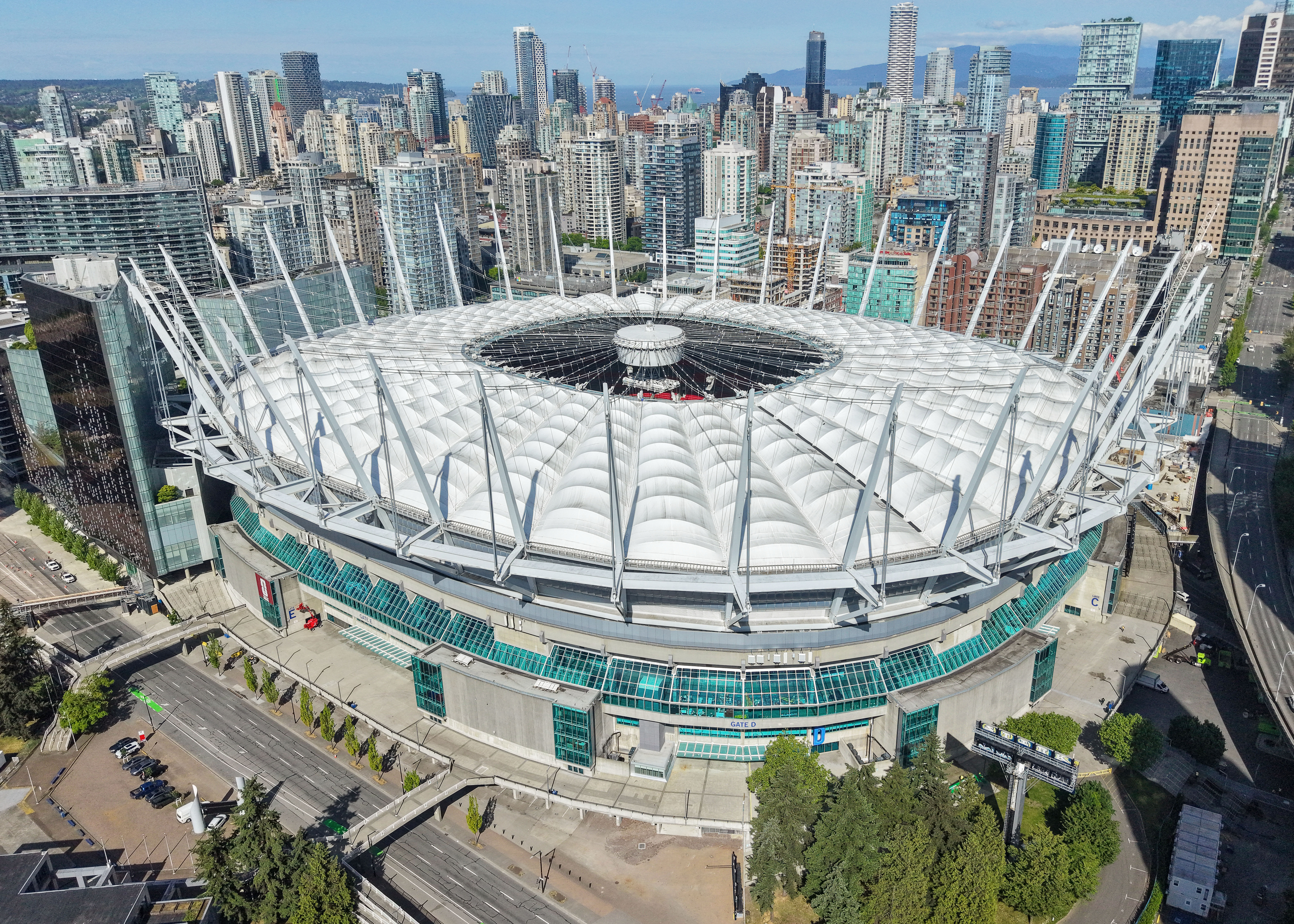
For the first Roadblock of this season, racers had to jump from the catwalk inside BC Place in Vancouver.

- Episode 1: "Sorry Guys, We Used Our Express Pass" (September 30, 2026)
- Prize: Cashback rewards for a trip for two to Istanbul and Cappadocia, Turkey (awarded to Erin & Javi)
- Eliminated: Zach & Nate

Locations

- Vancouver, Canada (Jack Poole Plaza) (Starting Line)
- Vancouver (BC Place)
- Vancouver (Plaza of Nations → Vancouver Maritime Museum)
- Vancouver (Elsje Point or Teatotaler Beach & False Creek)
- Vancouver (VanDusen Botanical Garden)

Episode summary

- Teams began the race at Jack Poole Plaza, where each team received an Express Pass that they could use through the sixth leg. No more than one team could redeem an Express Pass on any given task.
- From the starting line, teams had to find their next clue outside BC Place.
- In this season's first Roadblock, one team member had to don grizzly bear claws and climb up into BC Place's catwalk. Racers then had to jump from a height of 200 feet on a bungee swing and grab a Pacific salmon to receive their next clue. Erin & Javi used their Express Pass to bypass this task.
- After the Roadblock, teams had to travel by Aquabus water taxi to the Vancouver Maritime Museum and find their next clue outside of the museum.
- This season's first Detour was a choice between Run It Up or Paddle It Out. In Run It Up, teams had to memorize the single-flag signals of 25 maritime flags and find a boat on a nearby dock, where the captain would randomly shout five signals and teams had to raise the correct flags within two minutes to receive their next clue. Dafina & Saran used their Express Pass to bypass this task. In Paddle It Out, teams had to paddle a va'a outrigger canoe along False Creek to one of six buoys with their next clue. Dylan & Doug used their Express Pass to bypass this task.
- After the Detour, teams had to check in at the Pit Stop: the VanDusen Botanical Garden.

Additional notes

- Before the race began, teams flew on floatplanes from Vancouver International Water Airport to Vancouver Harbour Flight Centre and experienced a welcoming ceremony at the starting line by representatives of the Squamish Nation.
- Squamish hereditary chief Ian Campbell appeared as the Pit Stop greeter during this leg.

=== Leg 2 (Canada → Spain) ===
The teams visited Puerta del Sol while in Madrid before choosing a Detour task.

- Episode 2: "Are Tomatoes Good for Skin Care?" (October 1, 2026)
- Prize: Cashback rewards for a trip for two to Hobart, Australia (awarded to Ali & Joanna)
- Eliminated: Katie & Charlotte

Locations

- Richmond (Aberdeen Centre – Silkway Travel)
- Vancouver (Vancouver International Airport) → Madrid, Spain (Madrid–Barajas Airport)
- Madrid (Aeropuerto T1-T2-T3 Metro Station → Batán Metro Station)
- Madrid (Plaza de Toros El Batán)
- Madrid (Puerta del Sol)
- Madrid (Extrem Puro Extremadura & Perro Paco Restaurant or Museo del Prado)
- Madrid (Plaza de España)

Episode summary

- At the start of this leg, teams were instructed to fly to Madrid, Spain, with teams required to book their plane tickets at Silkway Travel. Once there, teams had to travel by Madrid Metro to Plaza de Toros El Batán to find their next clue.
- In this leg's Roadblock, which was a Switchback from season 10, one team member had to participate in a La Tomatina festival and search through a pile of tomatoes for one with a miniature clue – a capsule containing an image of Puerta del Sol – inside it while locals pelted them with tomatoes. Daisha & Dalton used their Express Pass to bypass this task.
- After the Roadblock, teams had to find their next clue at Puerta del Sol.
- This leg's Detour was a choice between Slice of Ham or Slice of History. In Slice of Ham, teams had to deliver a jamón ibérico to a restaurant, where they had to properly slice 50 grams of ham and prepare a charcuterie board to receive their next clue. Cody & Jaime used their Express Pass to bypass this task. In Slice of History, teams had to find 12 Spanish historical impersonators, who would each say a fact about themselves but not their names, and then match portraits to their names to receive their next clue. Jody & Jenn used their Express Pass to bypass this task.
- After the Detour, teams had to check in at the Pit Stop: Plaza de España.

=== Leg 3 (Spain → Morocco) ===
After arriving in Marrakesh, teams ventured into the Agafay Desert.

- Episode 3: "This is Sick and Twisted" (October 7, 2026)
- Prize: Cashback rewards for a trip for two to Singapore (awarded to Ann-Marie & Riley)
- Eliminated: Jody & Jenn (Note: The third episode ended on a cliffhanger with Doug & Dylan and Jody & Jenn running to the Pit Stop. The subsequent episode began with Doug & Dylan beating out Jody & Jenn.)

Locations

- Madrid (Madrid–Barajas Airport) → Marrakesh, Morocco (Marrakesh Menara Airport)
- Tameslouht (Razani Pottery)
- Agafay (Agafay Desert)
- Marrakesh (Arset El Bilk Garden)
- Marrakesh (Jemaa el-Fnaa)
- Marrakesh (Koutoubia Gardens)

Episode summary

- At the start of this leg, teams were instructed to fly to Marrakesh, Morocco. Once there, teams had to travel by taxi to Razani Pottery, which had their next clue.
- In this leg's Roadblock, one team member had to smash reject clay jugs until they found their next clue. One of the clues contained a new advantage called Roadside Assistance, which allowed racers to ask their partner for help during a Roadblock up until the fifth leg, and was found by Dafina & Saran.
- After the Roadblock, teams had to travel by taxi into the Agafay Desert to their next clue.
- This leg's Detour was a choice between Walk or Talk. In Walk, teams had to roll two large tires to a hitching post, fill the tires with alfalfa, and then retrieve two camels to receive their next clue. Anuar & Andrea used their Express Pass to bypass this task. In Talk, teams had to drive a dune buggy through the desert, memorize three sign posts that each contained part of a name for an Amazigh tea, and drive to a camp, where they had to correctly recite the tea before sampling some and receiving their next clue.
- After the Detour, teams had to travel by taxi to the Arset El Bilk Garden and find their next clue at Jemaa el-Fnaa. There, teams had to properly stack fruit on a stand to receive their next clue, which directed them to travel on foot to the Pit Stop: the Koutoubia Gardens. Ann-Marie & Riley used their Express Pass to bypass this task.

=== Leg 4 (Morocco) ===
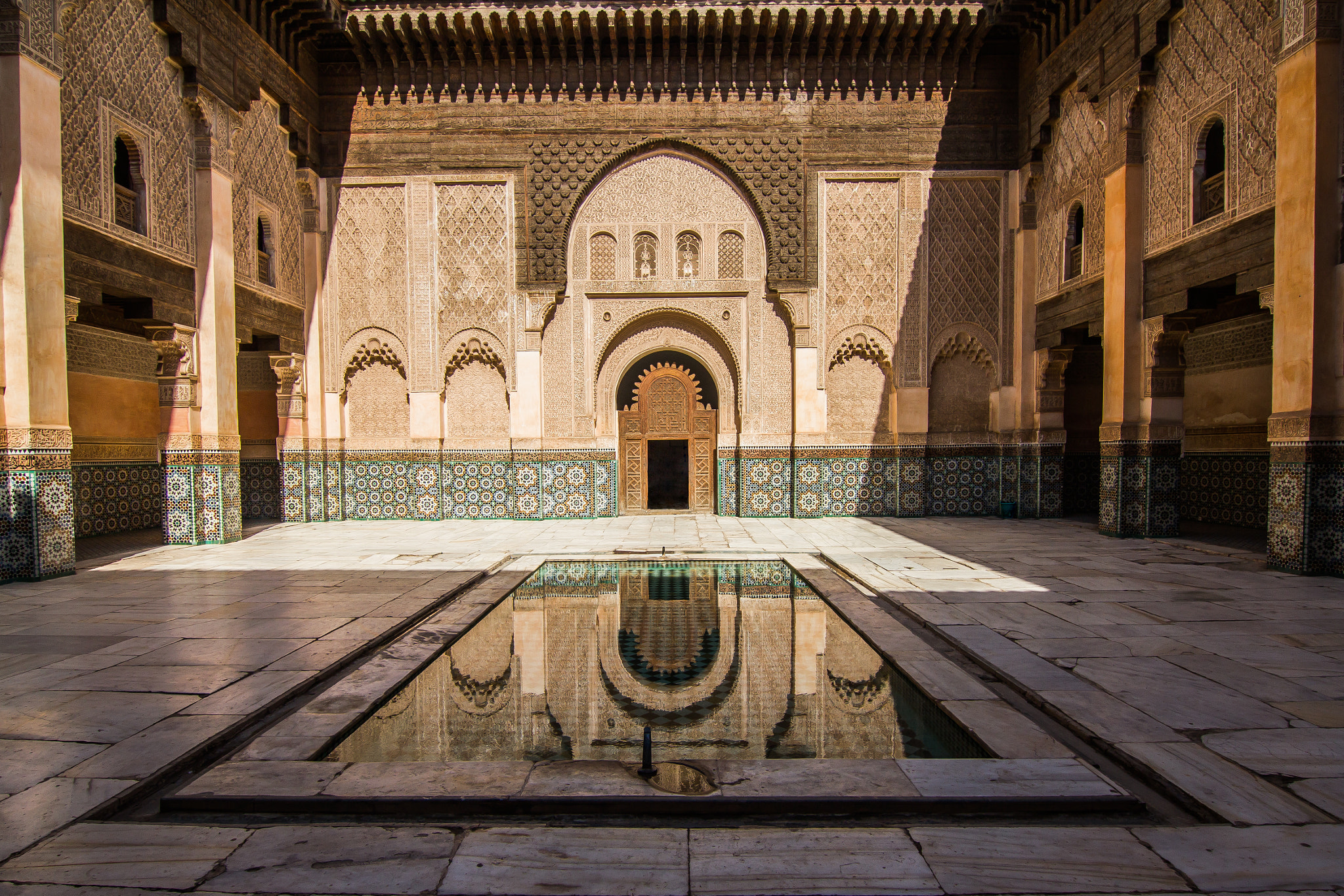
Following a Scramble through Marrakesh's medina, teams found the fourth Pit Stop in the courtyard of Ben Youssef Madrasa.

- Episode 4: "Deception and Sleight of Hand" (October 14, 2026)
- Prize: Cashback rewards for a trip for two to Okinawa, Japan (awarded to Michelle & Matt)
- Eliminated: Cody & Jaime

Locations

- Marrakesh (Koutoubia Gardens)
- Marrakesh (Bab Debbagh)
- Marrakesh (Association Sidi Yacoub Tannerie)
  - Marrakesh (Rahba Kedima Square & Palais Dar Si Aissa)
  - Marrakesh (Souk Smata)
  - Marrakesh (Souk des Teinturiers)
- Marrakesh (Ben Youssef Madrasa)

Episode summary

- At the start of this leg, teams were released in two-minute intervals signaled by two garrabs ringing bells based on the order of their arrival at the previous Pit Stop and were instructed to travel by taxi to Bab Debbagh and find their next clue at the Association Sidi Yacoub Tannerie.
- Teams encountered a Scramble and had to complete, in any order, three tasks in Marrakesh's medina quarter related to Moroccan handicrafts to receive three pieces of a clue revealing their next destination.
  - For the task at Rahba Kedima Square entitled Rug Run, teams had to deliver a nine-foot Moroccan rug to the Palais Dar Si Aissa and lay it out on the rooftop to receive a clue piece.
  - For this leg's Roadblock at Souk Smata entitled Slipper Search, one team member had to choose a pair of babouche slippers and search the market for an exact match to receive a clue piece. Dafina & Saran used their Roadside Assistance on this Roadblock.
  - For the task at Souk des Teinturiers entitled Dye 'n Dry, teams had to dye one bundle of yarn dark blue and two yellow to receive a clue piece.
- The three clue pieces were three tiles with Arabic engravings (مدرسة ابن يوسف) of the name of the Pit Stop: the Ben Youssef Madrasa.

=== Leg 5 (Morocco → Albania) ===
Racers had to decipher a Cold War-style code inside Bunk'Art 1, one of over 173,000 Hoxhaist bunkers in Albania.

- Episode 5: "That's Honestly on Them" (October 21, 2026)
- Prize: Cashback rewards for a trip for two to Cusco, Peru, Machu Picchu, and Vinicunca (awarded to Michelle & Matt)
- Eliminated: Dafina & Saran

Locations

- Marrakesh (Marrakesh Menara Airport) → Tirana, Albania (Tirana International Airport Nënë Tereza)
- Mullet (Turtle Farm Albania)
- Kashar (Instituti i Artit Kulinar Royal)
- Tirana (Bunk'Art 1)
- Tirana (Downtown One)
- Tirana (Skanderbeg Square)

Episode summary

- At the start of this leg, teams were instructed to fly to Tirana, Albania. Once there, teams had to search outside of the airport for a marked car with their next clue, which directed them to drive to Turtle Farm Albania.
- In this leg's first Roadblock, one team member had to harvest grapes and grind them using a manual grape crusher to produce must, used to make raki, to receive their next clue. Teams encountered a Driver's Seat at the Roadblock, where the first team to arrive determined how many pounds of must racers had to produce. Michelle & Matt publicly assigned 50 pounds (22.6 kg) to themselves, Ann-Marie & Riley, and Erin & Javi; 75 pounds (34.01 kg) to Conner & Garrett, Dafina & Saran, and Daisha & Dalton; and 100 pounds (45.3 kg) to Ali & Joanna, Anuar & Andrea, and Doug & Dylan. Ali & Joanna used their Express Pass to bypass this task.
- After the first Roadblock, teams had to drive to Instituti i Artit Kulinar Royal to find their next clue.
- In this leg's second Roadblock, one team member had to roll out dough for byrek breakfast pastries to receive their next clue; teams could have the same person do both Roadblocks. Teams encountered a second Driver's Seat at the Roadblock, where the first team to arrive determined how many pastries racers had to roll. Michelle & Matt publicly assigned eight pastries to themselves; twelve pastries to Ann-Marie & Riley, Dafina & Saran, and Doug & Dylan; and sixteen pastries to Ali & Joanna, Anuar & Andrea, Conner & Garrett, Daisha & Dalton, and Erin & Javi.
- After the second Roadblock, teams had to drive to Bunk'Art 1 to find their next clue. There, teams had to search the bunker for a marked room, listen to a conversation on a cassette player, transcribe every seventh word, and decode the message to reveal a location – Downtown One – by choosing the first letter of each word to receive their next clue. Teams then had to drive to Downtown One to find their next clue, which directed them to travel on foot to the Pit Stop: Skanderbeg Square.

=== Leg 6 (Albania) ===
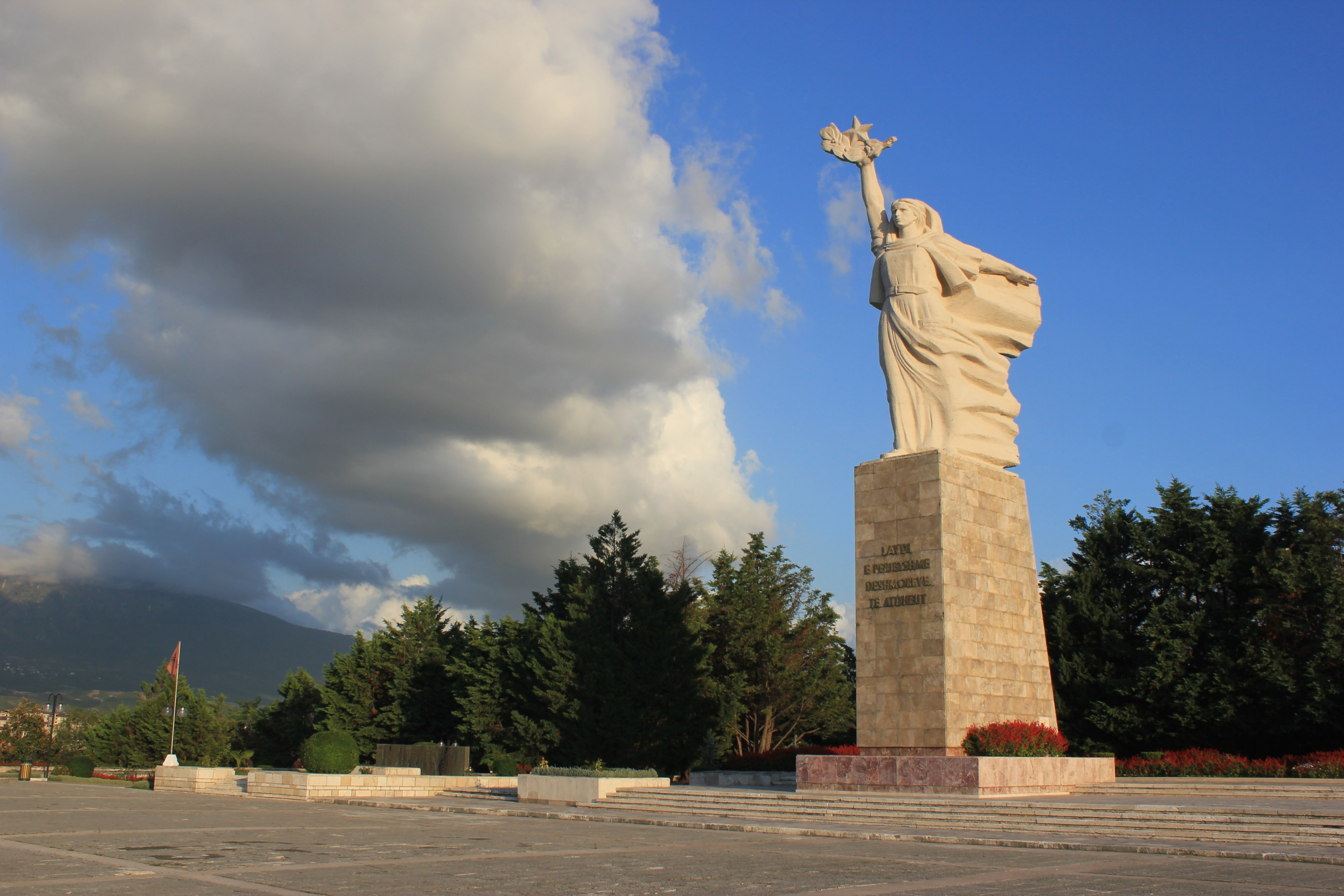
The second leg in Tirana concluded at the Mother Albania statue.

- Episode 6: "A Fine Line Between Confidence and Stupidity" (October 28, 2026)
- Prize: Cashback rewards for a trip for two to Alberta, Canada (awarded to Michelle & Matt)

Locations

- Tirana (Skanderbeg Square)
- Tirana (Pyramid of Tirana)
- Tirana (Jurgen Resort)
- Tirana (St. Paul's Cathedral)
- Tirana (Millennium Business Center – Albanian Night or Resurrection Cathedral)
- Tirana (National Martyrs' Cemetery of Albania – Mother Albania)

Episode summary

- At the start of this leg, teams were instructed to travel on foot to the Pyramid of Tirana and climb to the top to receive their next clue. Teams then had to drive to Jurgen Resort to find their next clue.
- Teams encountered an Intersection, which required two teams to mutually join together to complete the following task. The teams were paired up thusly: Michelle & Matt and Daisha & Dalton; Conner & Garrett and Anuar & Andrea; Ann-Marie & Riley and Ali & Joanna; and Doug & Dylan and Erin & Javi.
- In this leg's Roadblock, one member from each of the newly-joined teams had to perform an Albanian wedding dance called Vallja e Tropojës to receive their next clue. Express Passes could not be used on this task unless both teams had one. After this task, teams were no longer joined.
- After the Roadblock, teams had to drive to St. Paul's Cathedral and find their next clue by a statue of Mother Teresa.
- This leg's Detour was a choice between Heads or Tales. In Heads, teams had to construct two qeleshe hats to receive their next clue. Michelle & Matt used their Express Pass to bypass this task. In Tales, teams had to memorize and recite a verse from Naim Frashëri's epic poem about Skanderbeg, Histori e Skënderbeut, in Albanian and English to receive their next clue. Conner & Garrett used their Express Pass to bypass this task.
- After the Detour, teams had to check in at the Pit Stop: the Mother Albania statue.

Additional note

- This was a non-elimination leg.

=== Leg 7 (Albania → Sri Lanka) ===
Following a U-Turn Vote, the Detour focused on the fishing industry of Negombo.

- Episode 7: "The Amazing Nightmare" (November 4, 2026)
- Prize: Cashback rewards for a trip for two to Auckland, New Zealand (awarded to Ali & Joanna)
- Eliminated: Doug & Dylan

Locations

- Tirana (Tirana International Airport Nënë Tereza) → Colombo, Sri Lanka (Bandaranaike International Airport)
- Negombo (Kuttiduwa Beach)
- Negombo (Negombo Fish Market)
- Negombo (Negombo Bus Terminal) → Colombo (Central Bus Stand)
- Colombo (Mada Park)
- Colombo (Pettah Market & Apsaras Saree Centre)
- Colombo (Edward Henry Pedris Grounds)
- Colombo (Independence Square)

Episode summary

- During the Pit Stop, teams had to book a flight to Colombo, Sri Lanka, using a mobile app. Once there, teams had to travel by taxi to Kuttiduwa Beach, where Phil Keoghan surprised them with a Live Double U-Turn Vote. Teams then found their next clue outside the Negombo Fish Market.
- This leg's Detour was a choice between Dry Out or Sell Out. In Dry Out, teams had to lay out fish to dry until they completely covered a mat to receive their next clue. In Sell Out, teams had to bring fish to an auction and sell them until they earned ₨5,000 (approximately US$16.5) to receive their next clue.
- After the Detour, teams had to travel by tuk-tuk to the Negombo Bus Terminal and then by bus to Mada Park, which had their next clue.
- In this leg's Roadblock, one team member had to stack 30 boxes onto a hand cart and deliver them to a saree store to receive their next clue.
- After the Roadblock, teams had to travel by tuk-tuk to the Edward Henry Pedris Grounds and play tuk-tuk polo. While one team member drove a tuk-tuk, their partner had to play polo and score a goal against an opposing team within 60 seconds to receive their next clue, which directed them to the Pit Stop: Independence Square.

Additional notes

- Doug & Dylan had an automatic U-Turn as their non-elimination leg penalty.
- Teams encountered a Live Double U-Turn Vote. Each team voted for two teams, with the top two vote recipients penalized with a U-Turn. The teams' votes, as well as the voting order, were as follows:

U-Turn Vote results
Team	Vote	
Erin & Javi	Michelle & Matt	Ali & Joanna
Ali & Joanna	Michelle & Matt	Daisha & Dalton
Conner & Garrett	Michelle & Matt	Daisha & Dalton
Daisha & Dalton	Michelle & Matt	Anuar & Andrea
Doug & Dylan	Daisha & Dalton	Anuar & Andrea
Anuar & Andrea	Michelle & Matt	Daisha & Dalton
Michelle & Matt	Anuar & Andrea	Ali & Joanna
Ann-Marie & Riley	Michelle & Matt	Daisha & Dalton

=== Leg 8 (Sri Lanka → Laos) ===
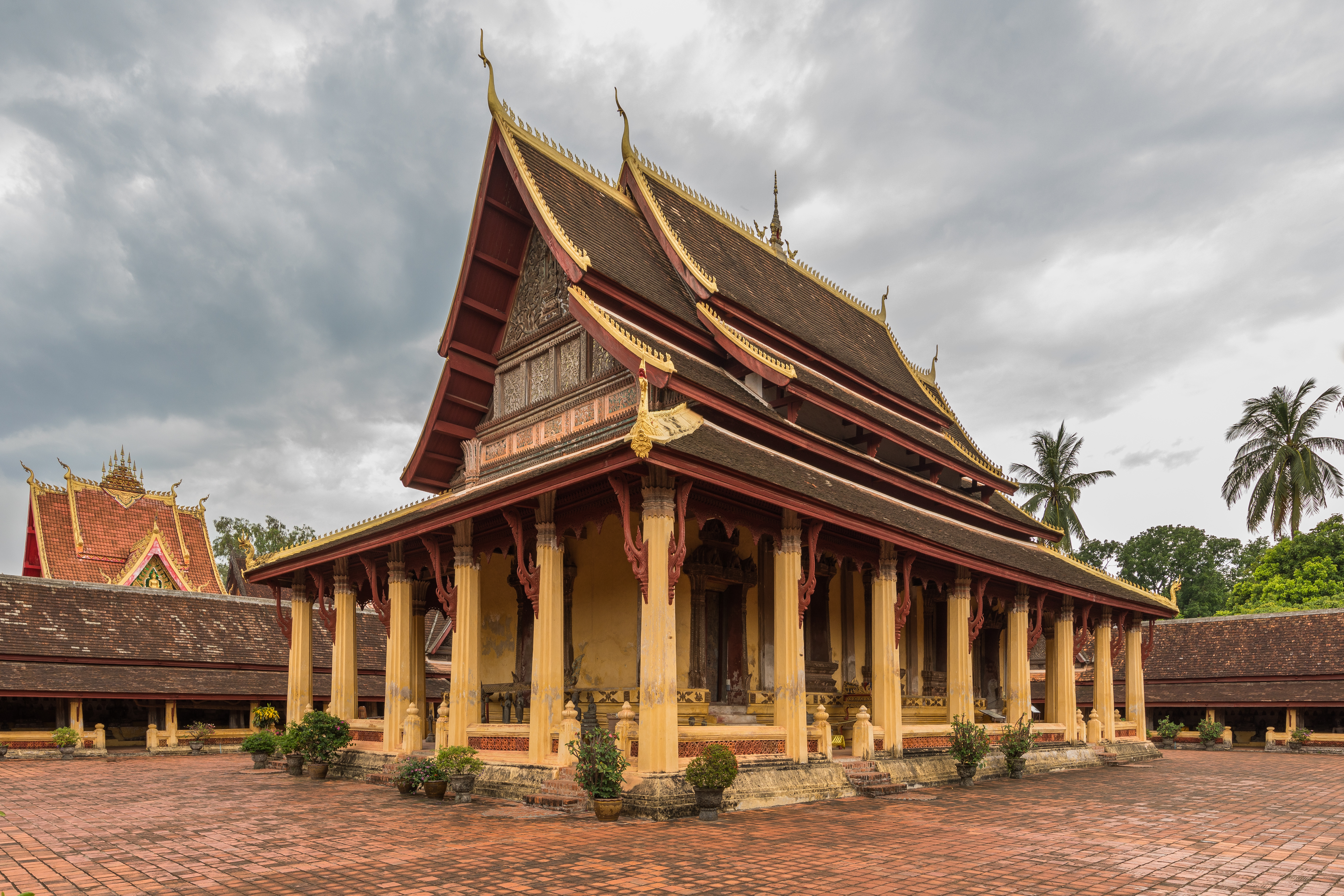
Wat Si Saket was the setting of the Roadblock in Vientiane.

- Episode 8: "Million Dollar Moves" (November 11, 2026)
- Prize: Cashback rewards for a trip for two to Manchester, England (awarded to Ann-Marie & Riley)
- Eliminated: Michelle & Matt

Locations

- Colombo (Independence Square)
- Colombo (Bandaranaike International Airport) → Vientiane, Laos (Wattay International Airport)
- Vientiane (Patuxai)
- Vientiane (Thong Khan Kham Market)
- Vientiane (Wat Thong Khankham)
- Vientiane (Lao National Circus)
- Vientiane (Wat Si Saket)
- Vientiane (Buddha Park)

Episode summary

- At the start of this leg, teams were instructed to fly to Vientiane, Laos. Once there, teams found their next clue by the Patuxai monument.
- This leg's Detour was a choice between Something to Taste or Nothing to Waste. In Something to Taste, teams had to purchase 11 ingredients from a list written in Lao and cook larb to receive their next clue. In Nothing to Waste, teams had to deliver 15 Beerlao crates with empty beer bottles to a recycling truck and then load 60 additional crates onto the truck to receive their next clue.
- After the Detour, teams found their next clue at Wat Thong Khankham before traveling to the Lao National Circus. There, teams had to perform a Muay Lao kickboxing routine to receive their next clue sending them to Wat Si Saket.
- In this leg's Roadblock, one team member had to count the Buddha statues within a marked section of the temple (582) to receive their next clue, which directed them to the Pit Stop: Buddha Park.

Additional notes

- This leg featured a Double U-Turn. Erin & Javi chose to use the U-Turn on Michelle & Matt, while Ann-Marie & Riley chose to use the U-Turn on Daisha & Dalton.
- At the Pit Stop, teams received letters from their loved ones.

=== Leg 9 (Laos) ===
The ninth leg was set among the karst mountains of Vang Vieng.

- Episode 9: "A Double-Edged Sword with an Alliance" (November 18, 2026)
- Prize: Cashback rewards for a trip for two to Budapest, Hungary (awarded to Daisha & Dalton)
- Eliminated: Ann-Marie & Riley

Locations

- Vientiane (Vientiane Railway Station) → Vang Vieng (Vang Vieng Railway Station)
- Vang Vieng (Sky Club Pub & Restaurant)
- Vang Vieng (Wat Si Sou Mang)
- Vang Vieng (Champathong Garden Resort or Pakpor Primary School)
- Vang Vieng (Blue Bridge → Tham Chang)

Episode summary

- At the start of this leg, teams were instructed to travel by train to Vang Vieng. Once there, teams found their next clue in a marked songthaew outside of the railway station sending them to the Sky Club Pub & Restaurant.
- In this leg's Roadblock, one team member had to fly on a paramotor and spot the name of their next destination – Wat Si Sou Mang – from 1,000 feet (300 m) in the air. Only three paramotors were available at a time.
- After the Roadblock, teams found their next clue at Wat Si Sou Mang.
- This leg's Detour was a choice between Stalks or Steps. In Stalks, teams had to harvest eight kilograms (18 lb) of rice stalks, tie the stalks into bundles, load the bundles onto bamboo carriers, bring the carriers to a river, and lay the bundles on a tarpaulin to receive their next clue. In Steps, teams had to perform a Lao bamboo dance to receive their next clue.
- After the Detour, teams had find their next clue by the blue bridge. Teams then had to paddle a kayak two miles (3.2 km) down the Nam Song River to the Pit Stop: Tham Chang.

=== Leg 10 (Laos → Australia) ===
- Episode 10: "We're Not Their Friends" (November 25, 2026)

Locations

- Melbourne, Australia
- Melbourne
- Melbourne (Hosier Lane)
- Melbourne (Melbourne Cricket Ground)
- Melbourne (Royal Exhibition Building – Carlton Gardens)

=== Future legs ===
==== Leg 11 (Australia → New Zealand) ====
- Episode 11: "Woman of My Word" (December 2, 2026)

Locations

- Christchurch, New Zealand
- Christchurch (Avon River)
- Christchurch (Edmonds Band Rotunda)
- Christchurch (Christchurch Botanic Gardens)

Additional note

- All Blacks captain Scott Barrett appeared as the Pit Stop greeter during this leg.

==== Leg 12 (New Zealand → United States) ====
- Episode 12: "Trust Yourself, Trust Your Confidence" (December 9, 2026)

Locations

- Honolulu, Hawaii

== Production ==
=== Development and filming ===
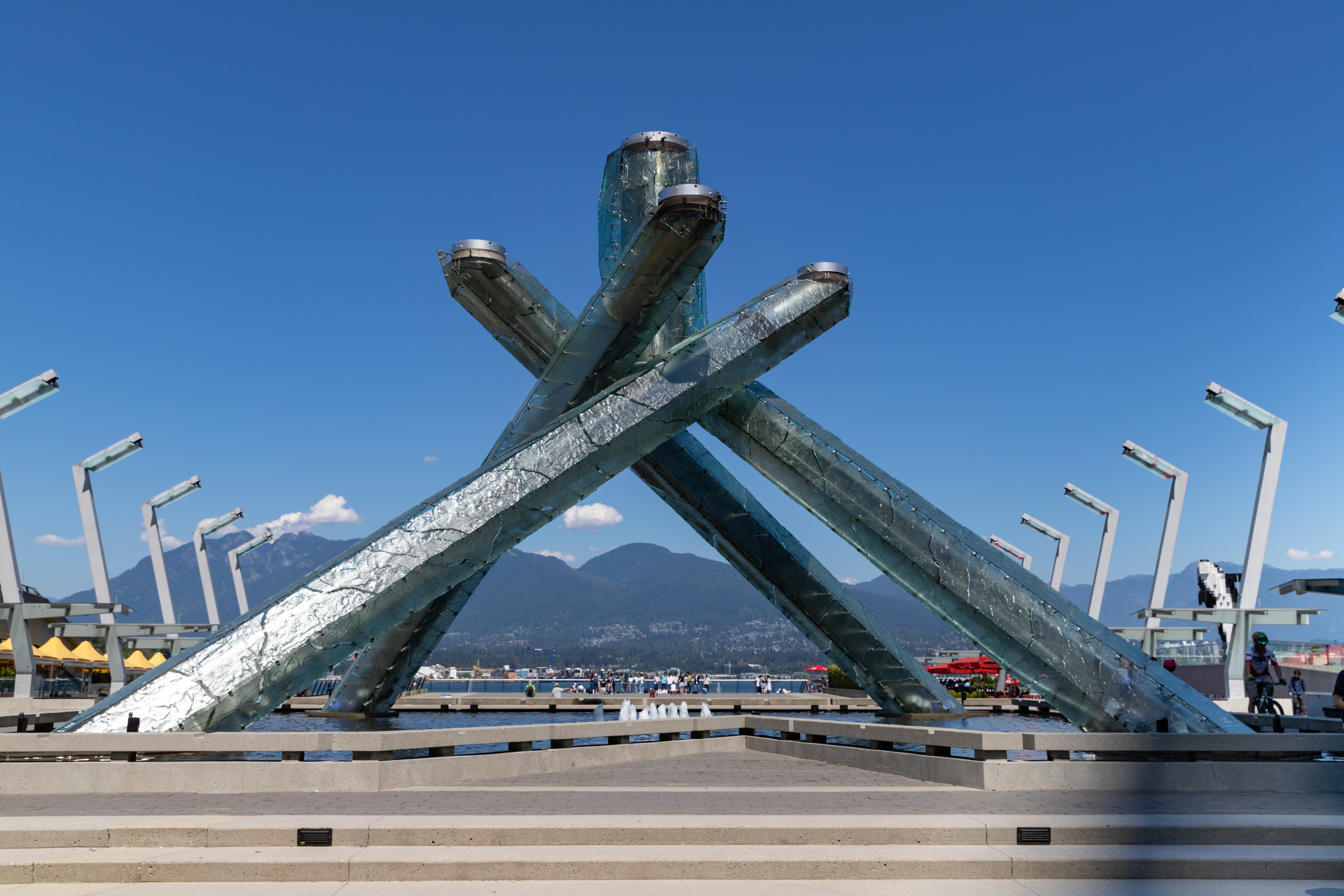
After flying on floatplanes into Vancouver, teams assembled at Jack Poole Plaza by the 2010 Winter Olympics cauldron to begin The Amazing Race 39.

The teams went into sequester in Los Angeles on September 17, 2025. Filming for this season began on September 22 in Vancouver, Canada. In a new twist during this leg, each team was given an Express Pass that they could use through the sixth leg of the race, provided no two passes are used on the same challenge. The third leg debuted a new advantage called Roadside Assistance that allowed both team members to complete a Roadblock. A leg was filmed in Vang Vieng, Laos, on October 11. Phil Keoghan and production crews were sighted filming in Melbourne, Australia, on October 13. The teams then arrived in Melbourne on the following day. The teams left Melbourne on October 15 with the following leg taking place in Christchurch, New Zealand, on October 16. This marks the show's first visit to Oceania since season 22 as well as the first visit to Africa since season 31. The final leg was filmed on October 17 in Honolulu. This season also marks the first time that the show filmed in Albania – described as the 99th country visited by the race – and the first time that the show did not film within the contiguous United States.

When asked about this season in an interview with Parade following the season 38 finale, Keoghan stated "They say 'luck is the residue of design', and Season 39 is a perfect example of that. Captivating cast, some new twists which gave us the desired results of changing things up, great weather in destinations where it really made a difference, some unpredictable challenge moments and a special episode I took particular interest in ended with a special personal moment in my life." With regards to the personal moment, the penultimate leg featured a visit to Christchurch during which Keoghan's dad John visited the shoot while he was hospitalized, with this moment being the last time Phil saw his dad prior to his death in November 2025.

=== Casting ===
Casting for this season began on January 13, 2025, and closed on May 2, 2025. This season was the first since season 33 to not feature the mandatory 50% BIPOC casting diversity initiative that began in late 2020 following the decision by CBS to rollback its diversity, equity, and inclusion policies in April 2025. Despite the change, casting director Jesse Tannenbaum stated, "Well, from my perspective, nothing's changed. I've always, in the back of my mind, felt we needed more diversity on these shows...I'm still shooting for having a really diverse cast because I think everybody needs to be represented."

=== Broadcast ===
On January 22, 2026, CBS announced that the season would air in the 2026–27 television season. On April 11, CBS announced that the season would air in the fall of 2026 in the Wednesday 9:30 pm time slot following Survivor 51. On July 15, Entertainment Tonight revealed that the season's premiere date would be September 30, 2026. This premiere date was reiterated when CBS revealed its fall premieres on July 27 with the second episode airing on October 1 following the finale of Big Brother 28 before returning to its usual Wednesday slot. On September 29, the day before the season's premiere, Entertainment Tonight aired a special titled The Amazing Race: 25 Years Around the World.

=== Marketing ===
As part of the promotion for this season, CBS invited influencers to perform the tasks from the first leg. The influencers included Addison Briann, Asante Madrigal, Hannah Kosh, and Markell Washington. Nischelle Turner also participated in the Roadblock from the first leg in a segment for Entertainment Tonight. Keoghan made an appearance at the Minnesota State Fair in September 2026. Air New Zealand served as marketing partner during the season's visit to Christchurch and created a competition for American and Canadian viewers to win a trip for two to Christchurch.

== Reception ==
=== Ratings ===
No. overall	No. in season	Title	Original release date	U.S. viewers (millions)	Rating/share (18–49)
443	1	"Sorry Guys, We Used Our Express Pass"	September 30, 2026	2.83	0.4/6
444	2	"Are Tomatoes Good for Skin Care?"	October 1, 2026	2.11	0.3/4
445	3	"This Is Sick and Twisted"	October 7, 2026	2.50	0.3/4
446	4	"Deception and Sleight of Hand"	October 14, 2026	2.59	0.4/6
447	5	"That's Honestly on Them"	October 21, 2026	2.65	0.4/6
448	6	"A Fine Line Between Confidence and Stupidity"	October 28, 2026	2.43	0.3/4
449	7	"The Amazing Nightmare"	November 4, 2026	2.82	0.4/6
450	8	"Million Dollar Moves"	November 11, 2026	TBD	TBA
451	9	"A Double-Edged Sword with an Alliance"	November 18, 2026	TBD	TBA
452	10	"We're Not Their Friends"	November 25, 2026	TBD	TBA
453	11	"Woman of My Word"	December 2, 2026	TBD	TBA
454	12	"Trust Yourself, Trust Your Confidence"	December 9, 2026	TBD	TBA

== Works cited ==
- Castro, Adam-Troy (2006). My Ox Is Broken!. BenBella Books. ISBN 978-1-932100-91-4.
