= Nendo =

Nendo may refer to:

- Nendo Island, part of the Solomon Islands
- Nendo (design firm), design firm founded by Sato Oki
