= Oki Sato =

Japanese architect and designer (born 1977)

- 佐藤 オオキ
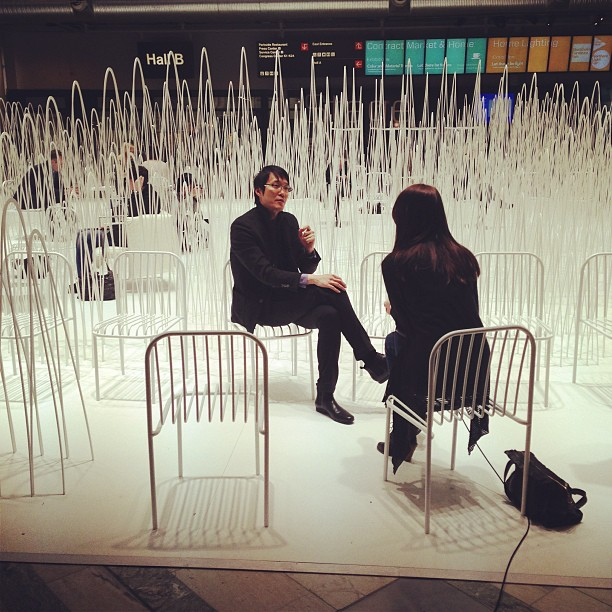
- Born: 24 December 1977 (age 48); Toronto, Ontario, Canada
- Education: Waseda University
- Occupation: Architect
- Design: 2020 Tokyo Olympic Cauldron
- Website: nendo.jp/en/

Oki Sato (佐藤 オオキ, Satō Ōki, born 24 December 1977) is a Japanese architect, designer, and the founder of the Nendo design studio. He was born in Toronto, Canada, attended Waseda University in Tokyo and graduated in 2002 with a Masters of Arts degree in architecture. He subsequently founded Nendo in his parents' garage in Tokyo. He has said that "Design is about making decisions. A person can only make a certain amount of decisions each day, and it's really important to keep your mind empty."

Sato also mentions in several interviews that meeting Issey Miyake had a significant influence in his work and practice.

His first exhibition, called "Streeterior", was introduced in Tokyo and then in Milan, Italy in 2003.

Sato has received several prizes such as Good Design Award, German Design Award, Elle Deco International Design Award, and was named the "Designer of the Year" by Wallpaper magazine in 2012.

He designed the cauldron for the 2020 Summer Olympics in Tokyo.

== Gallery ==
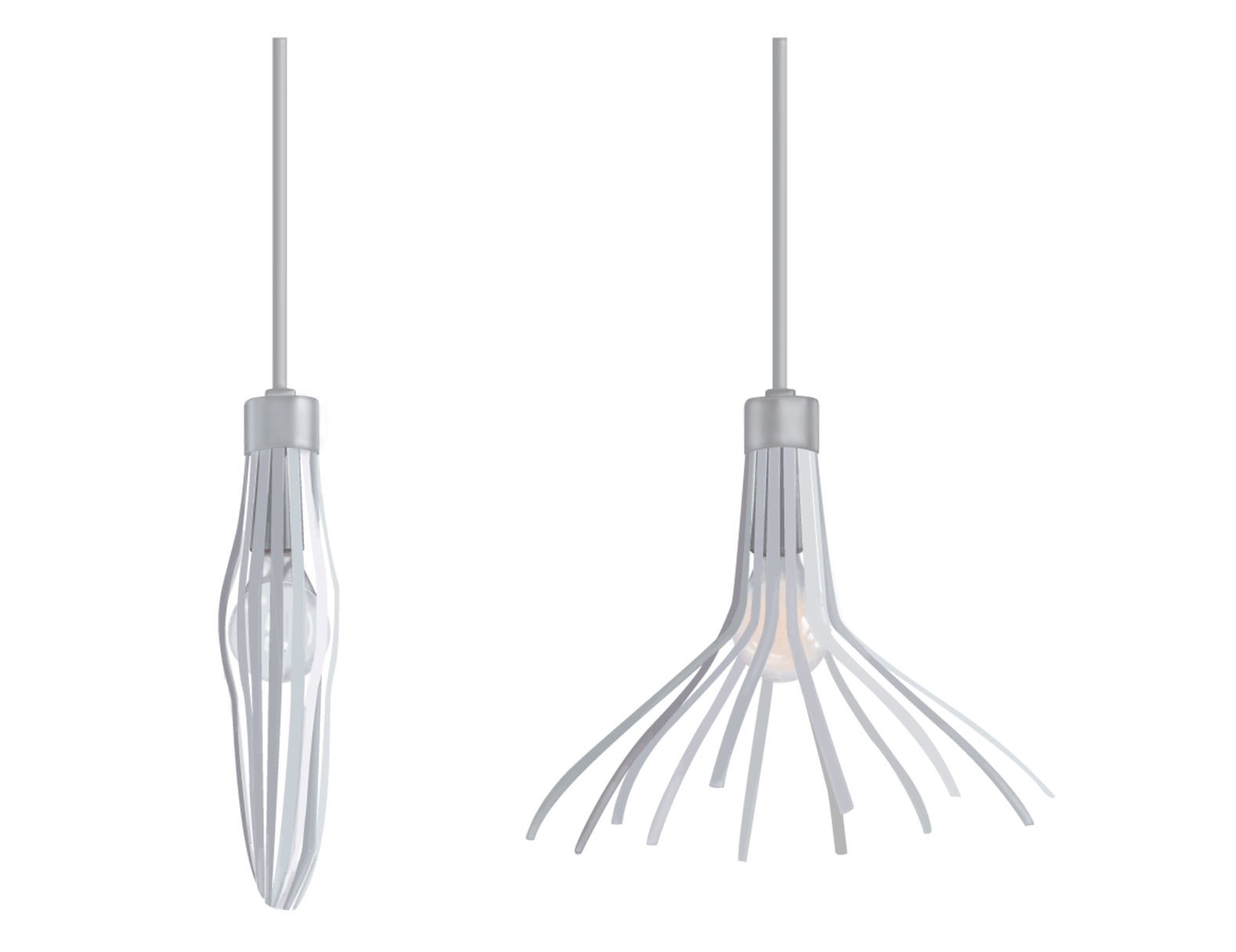
Hanabi lamp (2006)
