= 2010 Winter Olympics cauldron =

Monument in British Columbia, Canada

Coordinates: 49.289371°N 123.117685°W

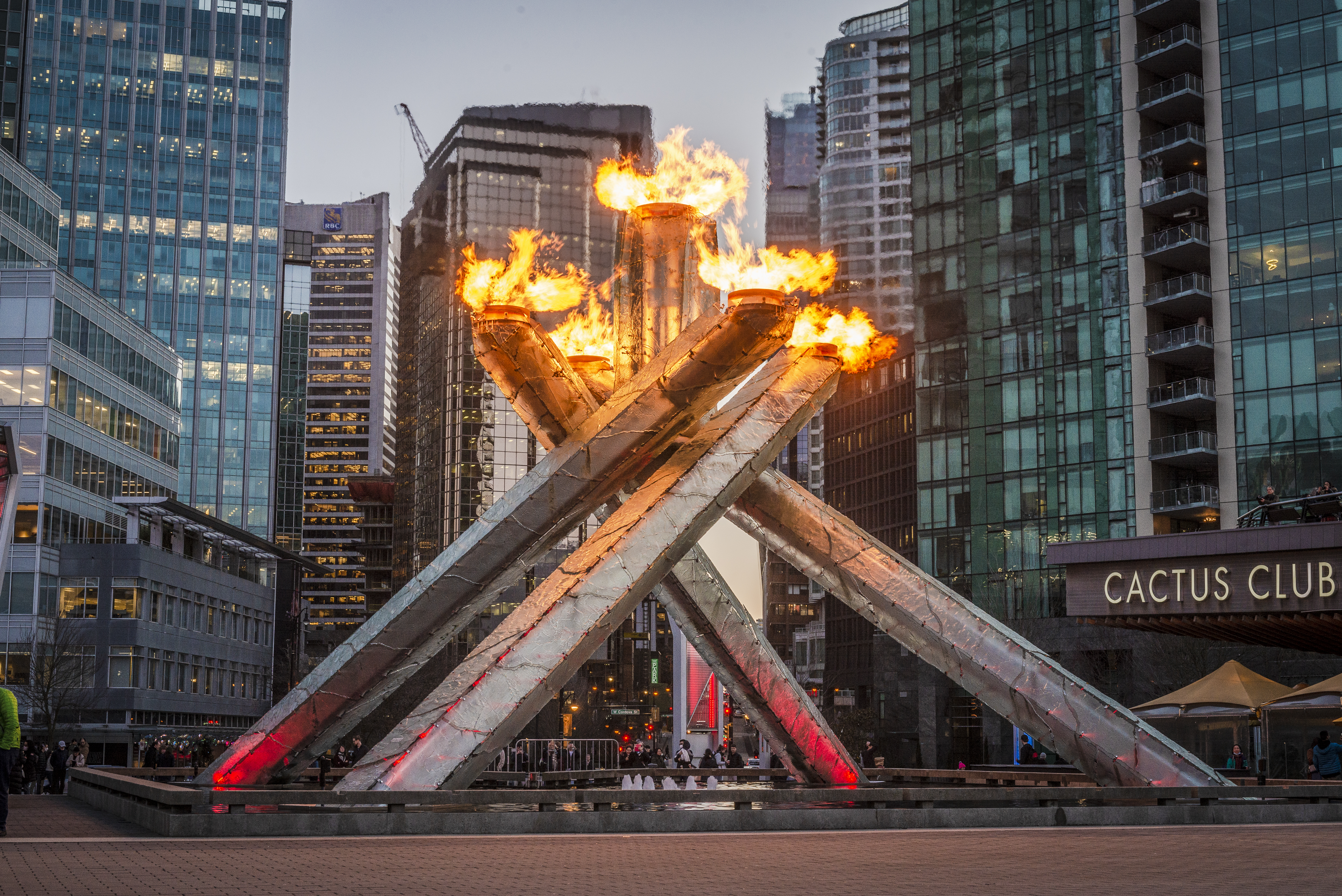
- The public cauldron at Jack Poole Plaza, re-lit for the 2022 Winter Paralympics.
- Interactive map of 2010 Winter Olympics cauldron
- Location: Vancouver, British Columbia, Canada
- Type: Cauldron

The 2010 Winter Olympics cauldron was erected for the 2010 Winter Olympics in Vancouver, British Columbia, Canada. A version of the cauldron was used as part of the opening ceremony at BC Place, while a permanent, public cauldron was constructed in Jack Poole Plaza, in compliance with protocol stating that the lighting of the Olympic flame should be visible outdoors to the public.

== Design and construction ==
The cauldron was designed by Canadian aerospace manufacturer Bombardier, alongside the torches used for the torch relay; it consists of four, crystal-like "arms" and a central burner. During the opening ceremony at BC Place, the four arms were to emerge from doors in the stadium floor, with each arm jointly lit by the final four torchbearers: Catriona Le May Doan, Steve Nash, Nancy Greene, and Wayne Gretzky. However, a technical glitch with the system controlling the doors caused only three of the arms to rise—inadvertently leaving out Le May Doan. The glitch was referenced and rectified during the prologue to the closing ceremony, where a mime "repaired" the cauldron, allowing Le May Doan to finally light it.

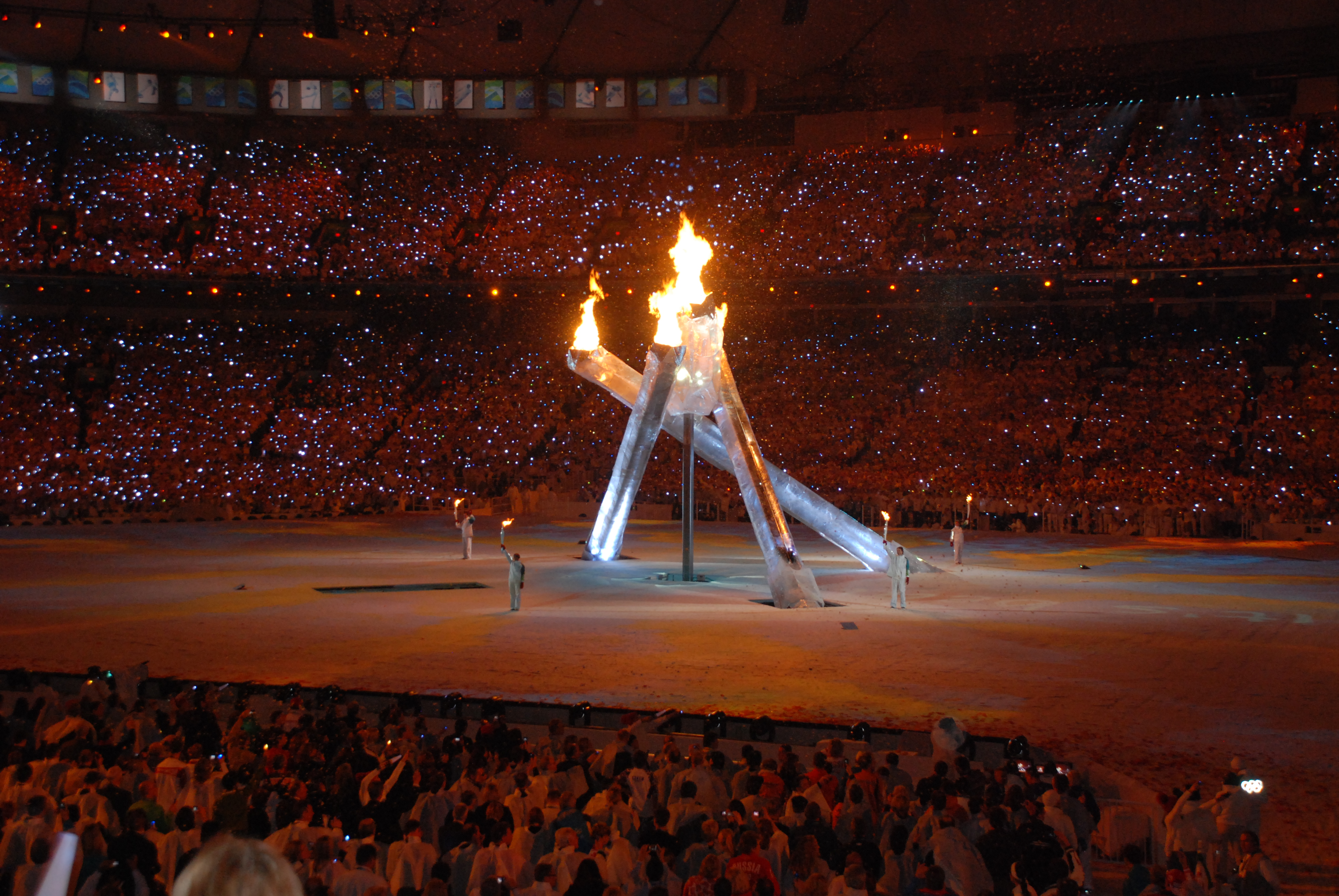
The partially-raised cauldron during the opening ceremony at BC Place.

The protocol specified by the International Olympic Committee (IOC) states that the lighting of the Olympic flame must be witnessed by those in attendance of the opening ceremony, and should be visible outside to the residents of the host city. The latter was not possible because this was the first Olympic opening ceremony to take place in an indoor stadium. Prior to the ceremony, the manufacturing firm Axton, Inc. was contracted by VANOC to construct a permanent replica of the cauldron in Jack Poole Plaza on the mezzanine of the Vancouver Convention Centre; it was constructed from steel, polycarbonate, and glass, with each of its arms being 16 metres (54 feet) long, and the entire cauldron standing 9.4 metres (31 feet) tall. Its burners were manufactured by FCT Flames, which had provided the burners for past Olympic cauldrons.

The public cauldron was manufactured under a 14-week deadline, and assembled under a scaffolding concealed by tarps during the lead-up to the opening ceremony. Following the conclusion of the opening ceremony, Gretzky was transported by truck to Jack Poole Plaza to light the public cauldron.

Controversially, public access to the cauldron was restricted during the Games, with the plaza being protected by fencing that also obstructed photos. The fences were later moved closer to the cauldron, and modified to include viewing windows.

=== After the Games ===
Following the 2010 Winter Paralympics, the cauldron's base was renovated to enhance its appearance and help deter vandalism, adding a reflecting pool with water fountains, along with additional security systems.

The glass exterior of one of the arms was vandalized in 2022, requiring $50,000 in repairs.

The cauldron's flames are re-lit for special occasions, including Canada Day, Remembrance Day, and subsequent Olympic and Paralympic Games.

== Legacy ==
Fearing a repeat of the issues that manifested in the 2010 opening ceremony, Danny Boyle—director of the 2012 Summer Olympics opening ceremony—told designer Thomas Heatherwick in a brief on his task to design the Games' cauldron, "whatever you do, no moving parts." Ultimately, the cauldron would be a very intricate design with a large number of moving parts, including individual stems and flames representing each participating country. Of the design, Heatherwick said that “when we proposed the most moving parts ever in an Olympic cauldron, we were nervous and feeling a bit guilty about that. But the same man who’d said that to us was the first person to say yes.” A part of the cauldron malfunctioned during the final rehearsal—a development that the team deliberately withheld from Heatherwick.

The notion of a second "public" cauldron outside of the ceremonies venue has been revisited by subsequent Olympiads:

- A version of the 2016 Summer Olympics cauldron was lit by a youth ambassador outside of Rio de Janeiro's Candelária Church following the opening ceremony. While the opening ceremony did take place at the outdoor Maracanã Stadium, it was the first opening ceremonies venue to not also be the athletics venue (athletics would be hosted by Estádio Olímpico Nilton Santos). This had led to questions over the placement of the cauldron prior to the Games, as the only other events it would host would be the football semi-finals and gold medal matches.
- A version of the 2020 Summer Olympics cauldron was lit at Tokyo's Ariake West Canal by Japanese badminton player Ayaka Takahashi following the opening ceremony.
- The 2022 Winter Olympics employed public flames at each of the three venue clusters, located on the Olympic Green, Yanqing, and Zhangjiakou.
- The 2024 Summer Olympics conducted its opening ceremony at sites across the city of Paris, rather than in a stadium. As a result, the 2024 Summer Olympics cauldron was a public cauldron by design, taking the form of a hot air balloon-like installation flown above the Tuileries Garden.
- The 2026 Winter Olympics utilizes separate cauldrons in its joint host cities of Milan and Cortina d'Ampezzo which, for the first time, were lit simultaneously.
