= Anthony Howe (sculptor) =

American kinetic sculptor (born 1954)

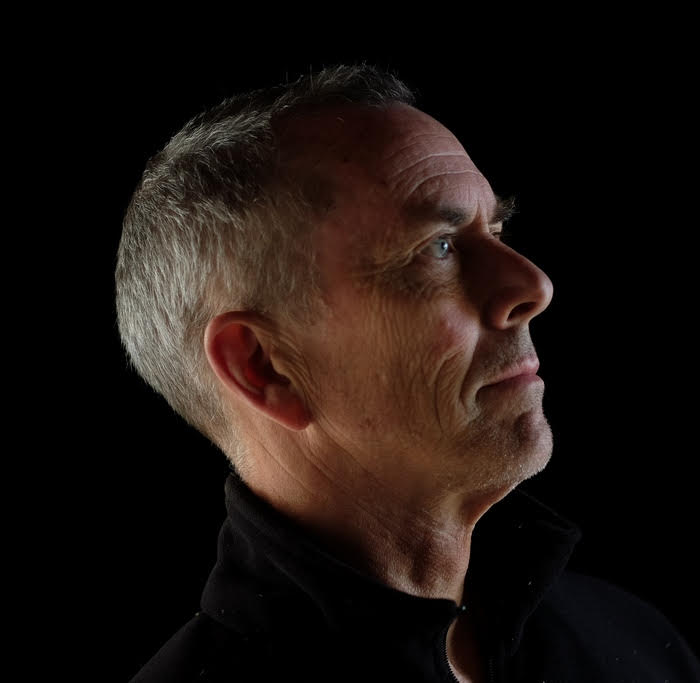
Anthony Howe in 2019

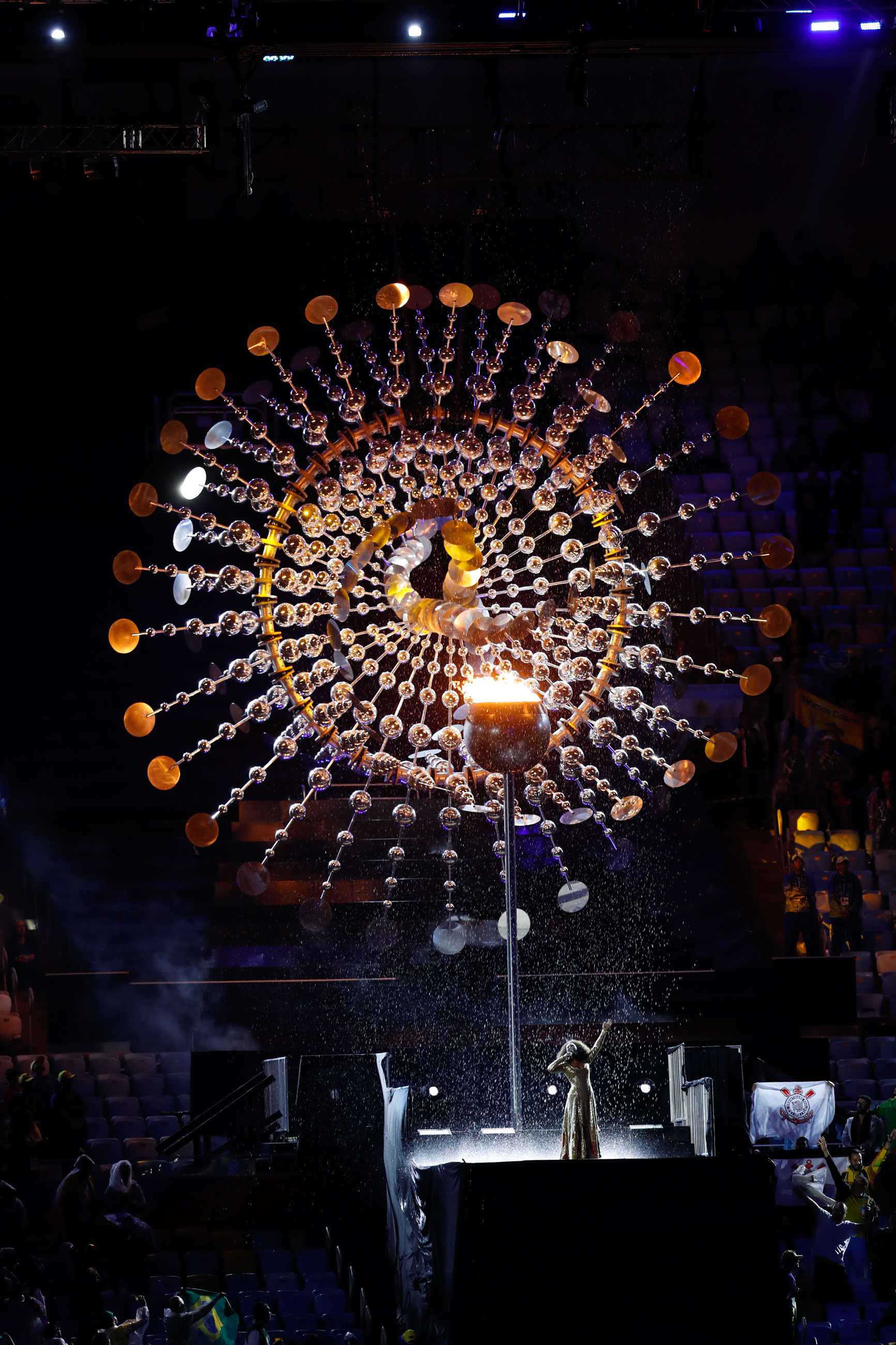
Howe's Olympic cauldron at the 2016 closing ceremony

Anthony Howe (born 1954, Salt Lake City, Utah) is an American kinetic sculptor who creates wind-driven sculptures resembling pulsing, alien creatures and vortices. He makes use of computer-aided design, shaping the metal components with a plasma cutter, and completing his work by use of traditional metalworking techniques.

Howe notably designed a cauldron and accompanying kinetic sculpture for the 2016 Summer Olympics in Rio, Brazil.

== Education and work ==
Howe attended The Taft School between 1969 and 1973, and for the next 6 years was enrolled at Cornell University and Skowhegan School of Painting and Sculpture. In 1979 he built a house on a remote mountaintop in New Hampshire. Here he painted landscapes for five years, and displayed his work at 'Gallery on the Green' in Lexington, Massachusetts. His paintings may be found in the collections of Teradyne, Harvard University, the William Small collection and other public and private collections.

In 1985 Howe moved to New York City and turned from painting to kinetic sculpting. Four years later his first work was hung from old elevator cables stretched between buildings. In 1993 he joined the Kim Foster Gallery in New York, and the following year moved to Orcas Island in Washington, where he once again built a house and opened his own gallery.

I attempt, with an economy of means, to construct objects whose visual references range from lo-tech sci-fi paraphernalia to microbiological or astronomical models. Utilizing primarily stainless steel armatures that are driven either by hammered curvilinear shapes or flat fiberglass covered discs, I hope the pieces assume a spare, linear elegance when conditions are still, mutating to raucous animation when the wind picks up. Multiple axis finely balanced forms, both symmetrical and asymmetrical, conspire to create a visually satisfying three-dimensional harmony.

— Anthony Howe

He claims one of his methods of testing the sculptures is by fixing them to top of his van and then driving down the local airstrip.

In August 2015, Howe was offered the role of designing a cauldron for the 2016 Summer Olympics in Rio de Janeiro, Brazil. The games' organizers had decided not to have a larger cauldron and flame as part of an effort to be environmentally conscious, resulting in the construction of a small cauldron with a larger kinetic sculpture to accompany it; the sculpture, which consists of ring of rotating bars, a 40 ft (12.2 m) in diameter, with reflective plates and spheres, was meant to enhance the appearance of the smaller flame, providing an effect inspired by the "pulsing energy and reflection of light" of the sun. The sculpture was designed at his studio on Orcas Island, with final construction occurring in Montreal before being shipped to Rio.

Simplified version of Howe's kinetic sculpture for the 2016 Olympics cauldron, color-coded to show its working principle
