= Karin Morisaki =

Karin Morisaki is a Japanese Paralympic powerlifter.

Morisaki was diagnosed with a spinal arteriovenous fistula shortly after she was born. The condition caused paraplegia.

== 2020 Tokyo Summer Paralympics ==
Morisaki was charged with lighting the Paralympic flame at the Tokyo Olympic Stadium alongside Yui Kamiji and Shunsuke Uchida.
