= Nendo (design firm) =

Japanese design firm

Nendo is a Japanese design firm founded in 2002 by Oki Sato, that works on design projects globally. The first office was situated in Tokyo. In 2005, the second office was established in Milan. The company works with numerous brands and have won multiple awards over the course of 17 years of establishment. Nendo is known for its simple and minimalist design with subtle influences from Japanese, and Scandinavian aesthetics. Currently the positions for CEO, COO and CFO are occupied by Sato Oki, Ito Akihiro, and Hama Takaaki, respectively.

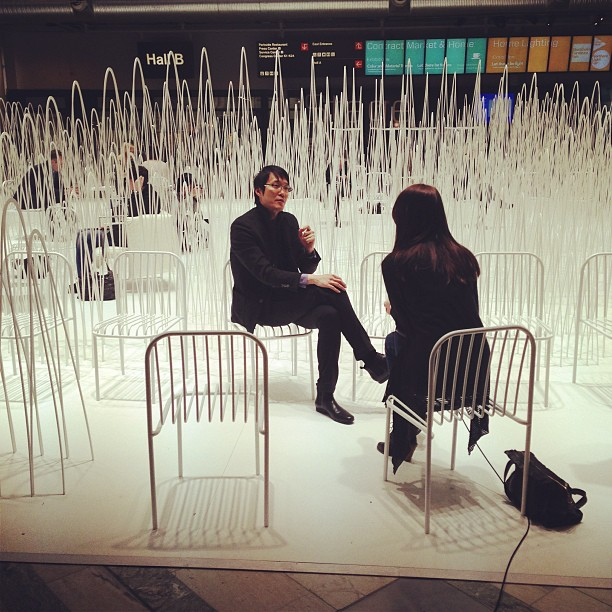
Sato Oki (left) being interviewed

The founder of ‘Nendo’ is a Japanese designer named Oki Sato. He was born in Toronto Canada, 1977. In 2002 when he was 25 years old, he graduated from Waseda University in Tokyo with a ‘Masters of Arts’ in architecture and in the same year founded ‘Nendo’ company in Tokyo. Sato also reveals in several interviews that the encounter with Issey Miyake was a large influence in his and Nendo's work.

== History ==
Oki Sato established Nendo Tokyo office in 2002. The Milan office was later established in 2005. Nendo is Japanese for playdoh or clay. It is this shape-shifting nature of the enjoyable toy which reflects the values of the company. By 2015, the company had 30 designers and interns of whom produced over 100 products for 19 brands in a year. Currently, they have over 50 employees working in the company. Nendo's first exhibition was held in Milan and Tokyo in 2003, called "streeterior".

== Notable projects ==
- Nendo's first large retrospective exhibition was in the museum of Holon, Israel
- Designed Siam Discovery
- Museum of Modern Art in New York
- Musee des Arts decoratifs in Paris
- Museum of Arts and Design in New York
- Cooper-Hewitt National Design Museum in New York
- Montreal Museum of Fine Arts in Montreal
- Israel Museum in Jerusalem
- High Museum of Art in Atlanta
- Victoria and Albert Museum in London
- Centre Pompidou in Paris
- Art Institute of Chicago in Chicago
- Triennale Design Museum in Milan
- Los Angeles County Museum of Art in Los Angeles
- Denver Art Museum in Denver
- Design Museum in London
- Philadelphia Museum of Art in Philadelphia
- 21_21 Design Sight in Tokyo
- Indianapolis Museum of Arts in Indianapolis
- M + Museum in Hong Kong
- Mondrian Foundation in Netherlands
- Museum of Fine Arts in Houston
- St. Louis Art Museum in St. Louis
- National Gallery of Victoria in Melbourne
- Luxury carpets designed for the collections of Nodus
- Furniture for Cappellini
- Su collection for Emeco

== Recent projects ==
The N02 Recycle project was one of Nendo's recent work, completed in October 2019. Fritz Hansen, a Danish furniture company, was the client of the project and it was an attempt by Fritz Hansen to create a circular economy where some of the waste materials can be brought back as components for their new product line. The N02 recycle chair was made from recycled plastic (polypropylene) that can be recycled again once it becomes obsolete for its intended purpose. Nendo's founder Oki Sato claims that this design aims to build connection with every-day recycled plastic.

The chairs can be stacked on each other for storage and have an ergonomic design with curved surfaces reinforced to wrap around the user. These chairs are created from household wastes and available in 7 different colours.

== Notable exhibition ==
'Between Two Worlds' was an exhibition held by Nendo with inspiration from Dutch artist M. C. Escher. The Escher X Nendo exhibition was opened at the National Gallery of Victoria in Melbourne. 157 prints of Escher's work, dated from 1916 to 1969, was displayed in the exhibition along with Nendo's monochromatic designs of geometry and space. The exhibition was held in December 2018 and carried on for 4 months.
