= Jack Poole =

Canadian businessman (1933–2009)

Jack Poole OC OBC
- Jack Poole, circa 2003
- Born: John Wilson Poole; April 13, 1933
- Died: October 23, 2009 (aged 76)
- Education: University of Saskatchewan
- Occupation: businessman
- Known for: Leader of the VANOC bid committee for 2010 Winter Olympic Games

John Wilson "Jack" Poole, OC OBC (April 14, 1933 – October 23, 2009) was a Canadian businessman who, as the head of the VANOC bid committee, was responsible for bringing the 2010 Winter Olympics to Canada.

He died of pancreatic cancer shortly after midnight on October 23, 2009, hours after the Olympic Flame was lit at the beginning of the 2010 Winter Olympics torch relay, in Olympia, Greece.

== Professional history ==
Poole graduated from the University of Saskatchewan in 1954, with a degree in civil engineering. He subsequently entered the field of real estate development (in which position he hired B.C. Premier Gordon Campbell, then a teenager, as a labourer; Poole later joked that he had given Campbell "his first job", and that by choosing Poole to chair VANOC, Campbell "gave me my last". Poole co-founded Daon Development Corporation, the second-largest real estate development company in North America until its collapse in the early 1980s recession when it was purchased by Bell Canada Enterprises.

== Family ==
His father John "Jack" Poole was a grain dealer of Cree descent. He is survived by his second wife Darlene, four daughters, his stepson Ryan Young and his extended family. One of his grandsons, Blake Hawksworth, was a Major League Baseball pitcher. His granddaughter Erin Hawksworth is a reporter.

== Honours ==
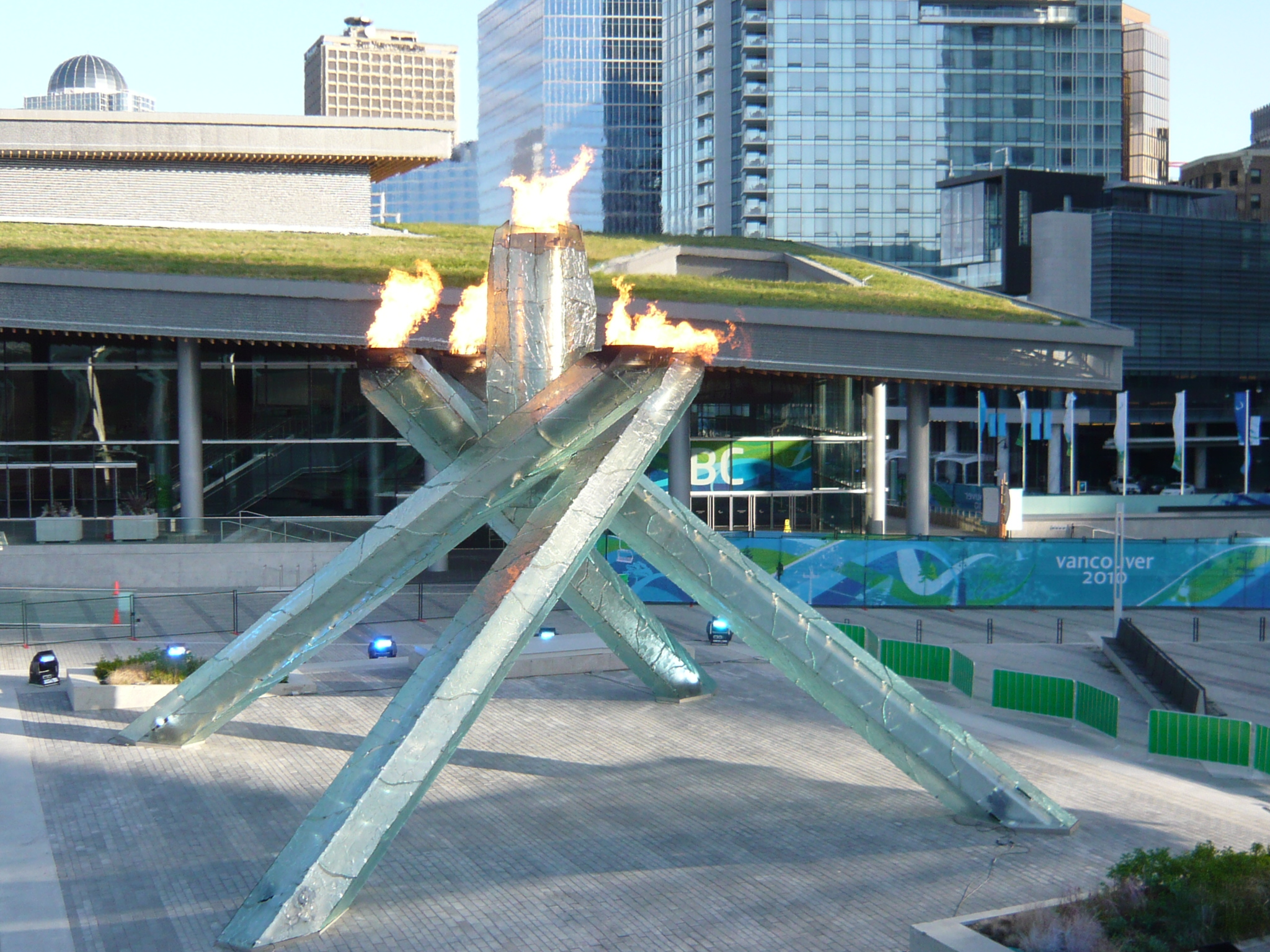
Olympic Cauldron at Jack Poole Plaza

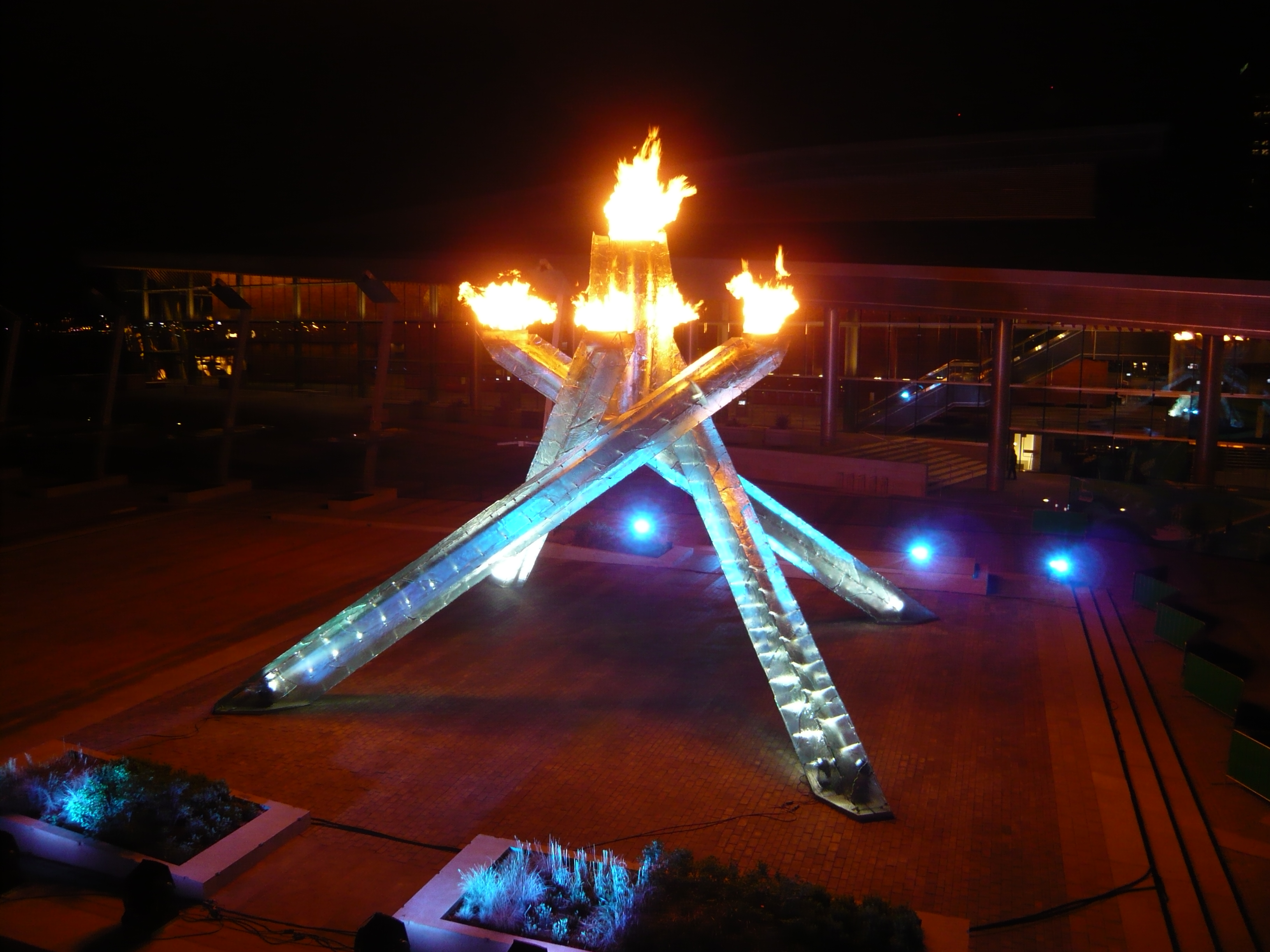
Olympic Cauldron at Jack Poole Plaza

Poole was made a member of the Order of British Columbia in 2003, an Officer of the Order of Canada in 2006, and a member of the Order of the Sash by the Metis Nation British Columbia in March 2007.

To honour his work and achievement for the 2010 Winter Olympics and 2010 Winter Paralympics, the former Thurlow Plaza was renamed Jack Poole Plaza in his memory. The external cauldron for the games was chosen to be built at the Jack Poole Plaza as well.
