= Jack Poole Plaza =

Plaza in Vancouver, British Columbia, Canada

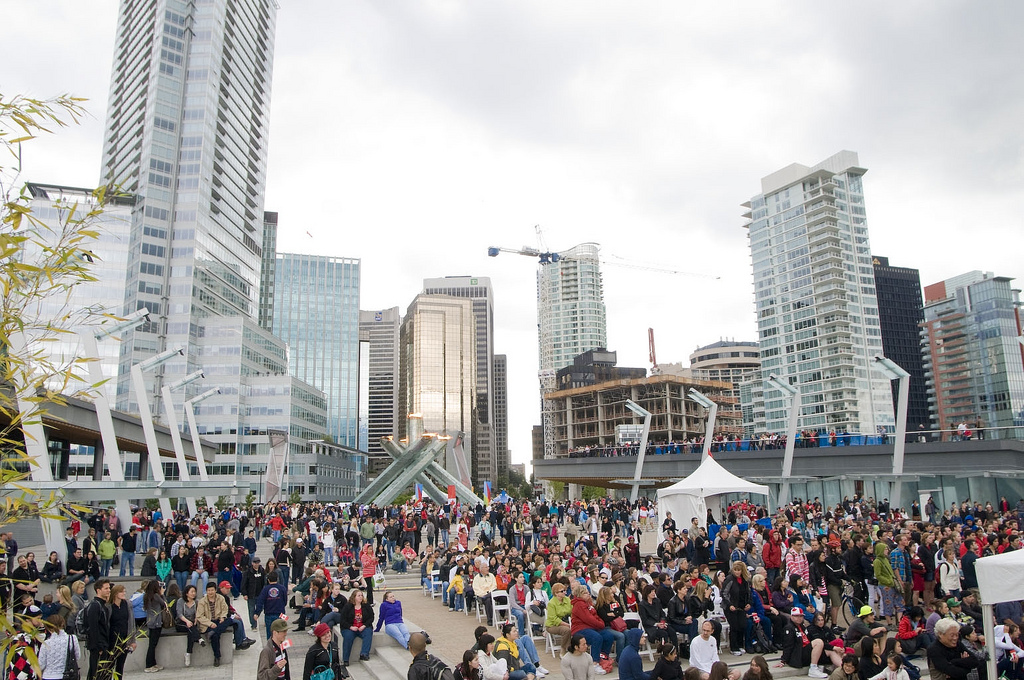
- The plaza on Canada Day, 2010

- Location of Jack Poole Plaza in Vancouver
- Coordinates: 49°17′22″N 123°07′03″W

Jack Poole Plaza is a plaza in the Coal Harbour neighbourhood in Vancouver, British Columbia, Canada. The space is named in honour of Jack Poole, who was the head of the Vancouver bid committee for the 2010 Winter Olympics. The site is home to the cauldron that burned during the 2010 Winter Olympics and Paralympics.

== Other events ==
In 2015, Fox Sports aired U.S. studio coverage of the 2015 FIFA Women's World Cup (whose finals were held at BC Place in Vancouver) from a temporary studio constructed at Jack Poole Plaza. Bell Media similarly constructed a temporary studio for TSN at Jack Poole Plaza at the 2026 FIFA World Cup, which hosted studio coverage and public watch parties until Vancouver’s final hosted match on July 7.

== Artwork ==
Artwork at the site includes "Digital Orca" installed 2009 by Douglas Coupland.

Also onsite is the 2010 Winter Olympics cauldron permanently displayed, with a reflecting pool added.
