= 2016 Summer Olympics cauldron =

Artwork by Anthony Howe in Rio de Janeiro for the Games of the 31st Olympiad

2016 Summer Olympics and Paralympics Cauldron
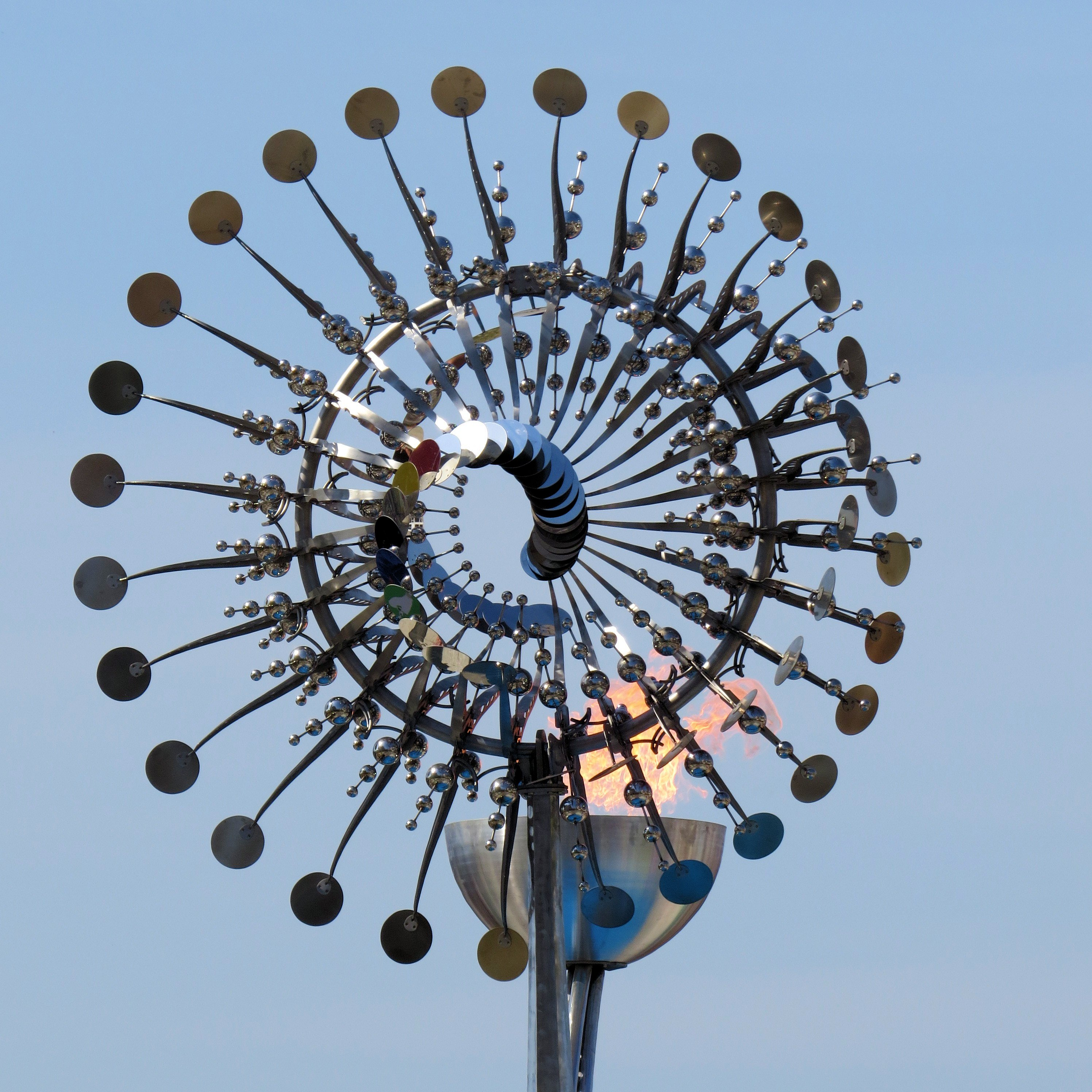
- 2016 Summer Olympics and Paralympics Cauldron
- Artist: Anthony Howe
- Year: 2016
- Location: Rio de Janeiro, Brazil; 22.901019°S 43.178461°W

The 2016 Summer Olympics and Paralympics cauldron (Portuguese: Pira Olímpica e Paralímpica Rio 2016) was made for the 2016 Summer Olympics and 2016 Summer Paralympics in Rio de Janeiro, Brazil. In fact, there were two cauldrons, one in the Maracanã Stadium for ceremonial use, and another on Rio's new waterfront Boulevard Olímpico, opposite the 19th-century Neoclassical Candelária Church, which was lit after the Opening Ceremony and remained alight throughout the Games. They both featured small flame cauldrons backed by much larger kinetic sculptures created by the American artist Anthony Howe. The ceremonial version spans 40 feet (12 m) in diameter.

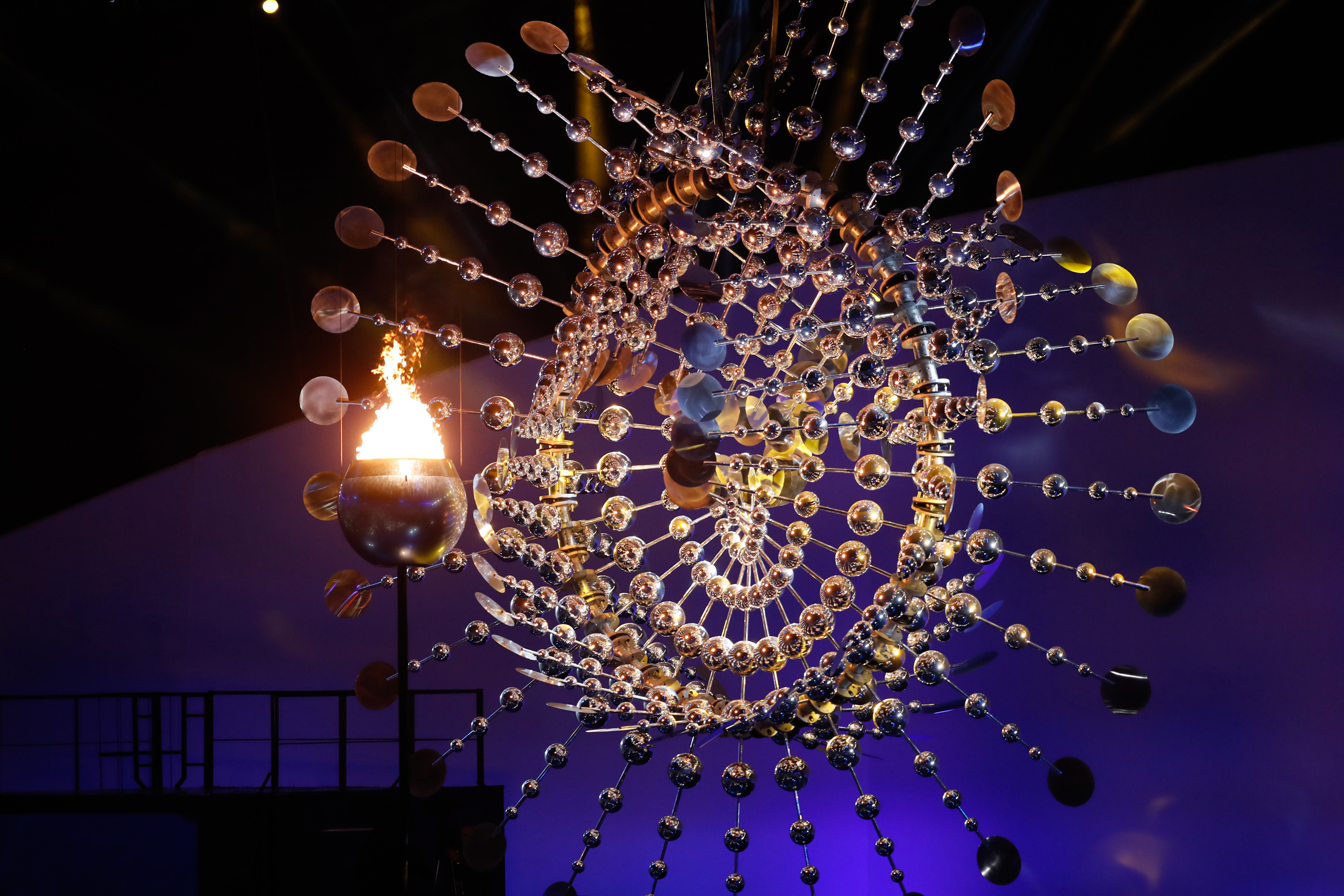
The Ceremonial cauldron inside Maracanã Stadium.

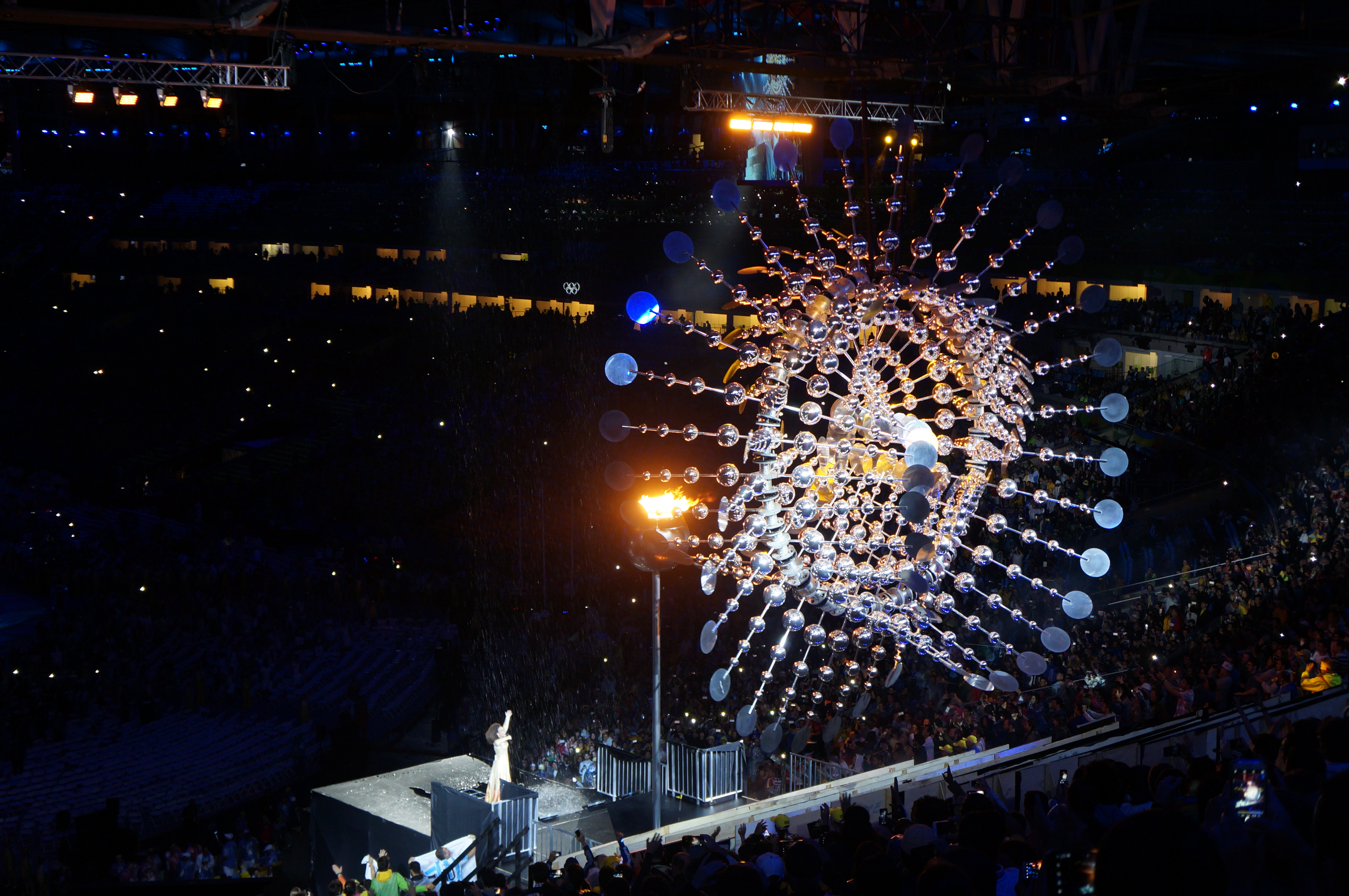
From behind, during the closing ceremony.

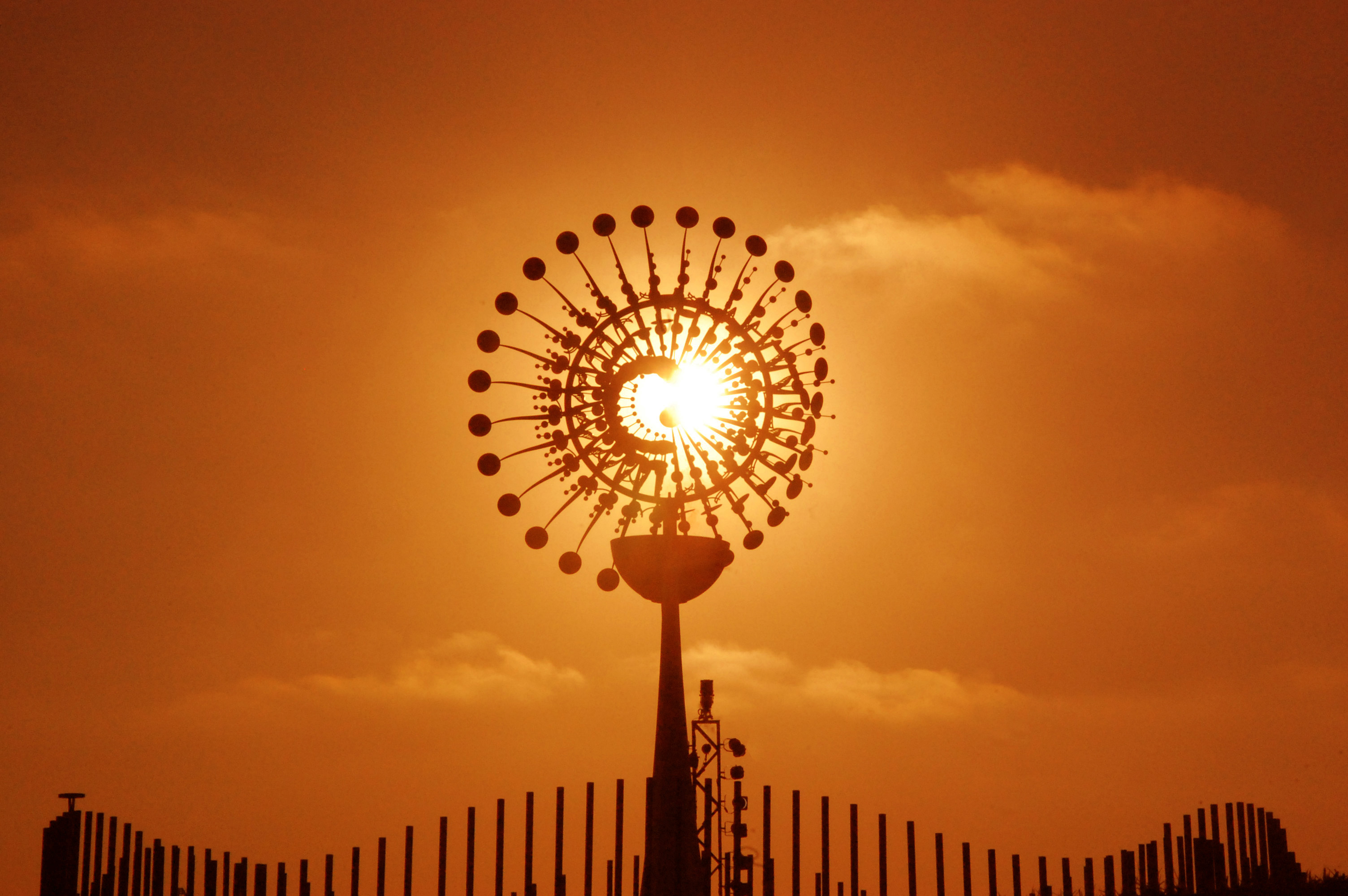
The Sun and the public cauldron at Candelária Square.

A simplified version of Howe's kinetic sculpture principle.

Howe, in his work, wished to "replicate the sun, using movement to mimic its pulsing energy and reflection of light." After the 2016 Summer Olympics and Paralympics, the waterfront cauldron has remained in place as a reminder of the Games.
