= List of Keikyu Corporation stations =

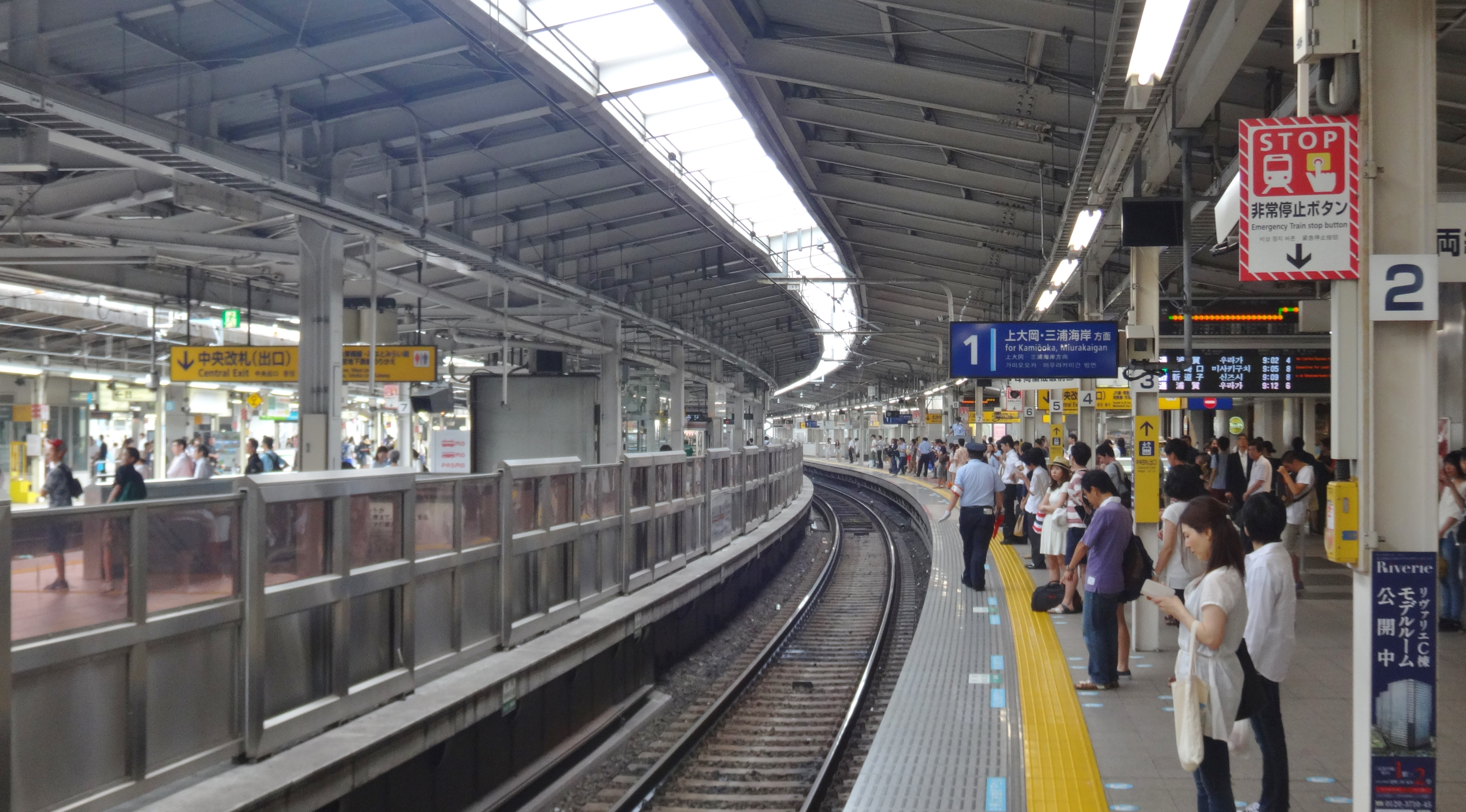
The Keikyu platforms at Yokohama Station, the busiest station on the Keikyu network, followed by Shinagawa and Sengakuji

List of Keikyu Corporation stations lists stations on the Keikyu network, including station location (ward or city), opening date, design (underground, at-grade, or elevated), and daily ridership.

== Summary ==
There are a total of 73 "unique" stations (i.e., counting stations served by multiple lines only once) on the Keikyu network, or 77 total stations if each station on each line counts as one station.

In general, the reported daily ridership is the total of faregate entries and exits at each station. For "interface" stations that allow for through-servicing and transfers with other railways without exiting the station's paid area (namely, Sengakuji), the daily ridership also includes cross-company passengers on through-servicing trains (as part of trackage rights agreements) or transferring from other railways' trains without passing through faregates. At faregate-controlled interchanges with other railways, additional data is also provided on passengers transferring from other railways, and at junction stations on the Keikyu network (e.g., Keikyū Kamata or Horinouchi), data is also provided on the total passenger volume exchanged between the main line and branch line.

Opening dates are given in standard Japanese date format (YYYY.MM.DD).

== Stations ==
Station number	Station	Lines	Ward or city	Opening date	Design	Daily ridership (FY2010)	Ridership notes	
A07	Sengakuji	Main Line	Minato (Tokyo)	1968.06.21	Underground	158,973	Connecting Toei Subway passengers: 136,431; Other entries and exits: 22,542	
KK01	Shinagawa	Main Line	Minato (Tokyo)	1924.03.11	Elevated	250,414	Connecting JR passengers: 127,112; Other entries and exits: 123,302	
KK02	Kita-Shinagawa	Main Line	Shinagawa (Tokyo)	1904.05.08	At-grade	7,602		
KK03	Shin-Bamba	Main Line	Shinagawa (Tokyo)	1904.05.08	Elevated	12,990		
KK04	Aomono-Yokochō	Main Line	Shinagawa (Tokyo)	1904.05.08	Elevated	44,564		
KK05	Samezu	Main Line	Shinagawa (Tokyo)	1904.05.08	Elevated	9,439		
KK06	Tachiaigawa	Main Line	Shinagawa (Tokyo)	1904.05.08	Elevated	17,303		
KK07	Ōmori-Kaigan	Main Line	Shinagawa (Tokyo)	1901.02.01	Elevated	13,673		
KK08	Heiwajima	Main Line	Ōta (Tokyo)	1901.02.01	Elevated	44,504		
KK09	Ōmorimachi	Main Line	Ōta (Tokyo)	1952.12.15	Elevated	17,652		
KK10	Umeyashiki	Main Line	Ōta (Tokyo)	1901.02.01	Elevated	13,544		
KK11	Keikyū Kamata	Main Line; Airport Line	Ōta (Tokyo)	1901.02.01	Elevated	47,313	Connecting Airport Line passengers: 134,924	
KK18	Zōshiki	Main Line	Ōta (Tokyo)	1901.02.01	Elevated	29,473		
KK19	Rokugōdote	Main Line	Ōta (Tokyo)	1906.10.01	Elevated	14,431		
KK20	Keikyū Kawasaki	Main Line; Daishi Line	Kawasaki (Kawasaki)	1902.09.01	Elevated, at-grade	115,036	Connecting Daishi Line passengers: 37,941	
KK27	Hatchōnawate	Main Line	Kawasaki (Kawasaki)	1916.12.25	At-grade	13,806	Connecting JR passengers: 543; Other entries and exits: 13,263	
KK28	Tsurumi-Ichiba	Main Line	Tsurumi (Yokohama)	1905.12.24	At-grade	18,154		
KK29	Keikyū Tsurumi	Main Line	Tsurumi (Yokohama)	1905.12.24	Elevated	28,156		
KK30	Kagetsu-sōjiji	Main Line	Tsurumi (Yokohama)	1914.04.12	At-grade	6,310		
KK31	Namamugi	Main Line	Tsurumi (Yokohama)	1900.12.24	At-grade	27,216		
KK32	Keikyū Shin-Koyasu	Main Line	Kanagawa (Yokohama)	1910.03.27	At-grade	8,164		
KK33	Koyasu	Main Line	Kanagawa (Yokohama)	1905.12.24	At-grade	8,050		
KK34	Kanagawa-Shinmachi	Main Line	Kanagawa (Yokohama)	1914.08.21	At-grade	16,736		
KK35	Keikyū Higashi-Kanagawa	Main Line	Kanagawa (Yokohama)	1905.12.24	Elevated	16,910		
KK36	Kanagawa	Main Line	Kanagawa (Yokohama)	1905.12.24	At-grade	5,363		
KK37	Yokohama	Main Line	Nishi (Yokohama)	1930.02.05	At-grade	311,025	Connecting JR passengers: 74,722; Connecting Tokyu and Yokohama Minatomirai Railway passengers: 32,918; Connecting Sōtetsu passengers: 33,577; Connecting Yokohama Municipal Subway passengers: 5,160; Other entries and exits: 164,648	
KK38	Tobe	Main Line	Nishi (Yokohama)	1931.12.26	Elevated	15,168		
KK39	Hinodechō	Main Line	Naka (Yokohama)	1931.12.26	Elevated	27,876		
KK40	Koganechō	Main Line	Minami (Yokohama)	1930.04.01	Elevated	22,955		
KK41	Minami-Ōta	Main Line	Minami (Yokohama)	1930.04.01	Elevated	17,276		
KK42	Idogaya	Main Line	Minami (Yokohama)	1930.04.01	Elevated (embankment)	26,837		
KK43	Gumyōji	Main Line	Minami (Yokohama)	1930.04.01	At-grade	29,082		
KK44	Kami-Ōoka	Main Line	Kōnan (Yokohama)	1930.04.01	Elevated	141,742	Connecting Yokohama Municipal Subway passengers: 18,805; Other entries and exits: 122,937	
KK45	Byōbugaura	Main Line	Isogo (Yokohama)	1930.04.01	Elevated	18,056		
KK46	Sugita	Main Line	Isogo (Yokohama)	1930.04.01	At-grade	33,762		
KK47	Keikyū Tomioka	Main Line	Kanazawa (Yokohama)	1930.07.10	Elevated	25,181		
KK48	Nōkendai	Main Line	Kanazawa (Yokohama)	1944.05.10	At-grade	31,041		
KK49	Kanazawa Bunko	Main Line	Kanazawa (Yokohama)	1930.04.01	At-grade	72,531		
KK50	Kanazawa Hakkei	Main Line; Zushi Line	Kanazawa (Yokohama)	1930.04.01	At-grade	53,907	Connecting Zushi Line passengers: 34,375	
KK54	Oppama	Main Line	Yokosuka	1930.04.01	At-grade	40,205		
KK55	Keikyū Taura	Main Line	Yokosuka	1930.04.01	Elevated	14,218		
KK56	Anjinzuka	Main Line	Yokosuka	1934.10.01	Elevated	4,981		
KK57	Hemi	Main Line	Yokosuka	1930.04.01	Elevated	5,288		
KK58	Shioiri	Main Line	Yokosuka	1930.04.01	Elevated	22,210		
KK59	Yokosuka Chūō	Main Line	Yokosuka	1930.04.01	At-grade	68,232		
KK60	Kenritsu Daigaku	Main Line	Yokosuka	1930.04.01	Elevated	12,537		
KK61	Horinouchi	Main Line; Kurihama Line	Yokosuka	1930.04.01	At-grade	13,017	Connecting Kurihama Line passengers: 103,243	
KK62	Keikyū Ōtsu	Main Line	Yokosuka	1930.04.01	At-grade	5,511		
KK63	Mabori Kaigan	Main Line	Yokosuka	1930.04.01	At-grade	10,169		
KK64	Uraga	Main Line	Yokosuka	1930.04.01	At-grade	23,331		
KK12	Kōjiya	Airport Line	Ōta (Tokyo)	1902.06.28	Elevated	22,294		
KK13	Ōtorii	Airport Line	Ōta (Tokyo)	1902.06.28	Underground	27,570	One of the most popular stations	Located near the Sega headquarters building (Home of the Sonic the Hedgehog series).
KK14	Anamori-Inari	Airport Line	Ōta (Tokyo)	1902.06.28	At-grade	13,805		
KK15	Tenkūbashi	Airport Line	Ōta (Tokyo)	1993.04.01	Underground	20,055	Connecting Tokyo Monorail passengers: 5,563; Faregate entries and exits: 14,492	
KK16	Haneda Airport International Terminal	Airport Line	Ōta (Tokyo)	2010.10.21	Underground	16,843		
KK17	Haneda Airport Domestic Terminal	Airport Line	Ōta (Tokyo)	1998.11.18	Underground	74,885		
KK21	Minatochō	Daishi Line	Kawasaki (Kawasaki)	1932.03.21	At-grade	3,222		
KK22	Suzukichō	Daishi Line	Kawasaki (Kawasaki)	1929.12.10	At-grade	8,114		
KK23	Kawasaki-Daishi	Daishi Line	Kawasaki (Kawasaki)	1899.01.21	At-grade	16,680		
KK24	Higashi-Monzen	Daishi Line	Kawasaki (Kawasaki)	1925.08.15	At-grade	11,208		
KK25	Daishi-Bashi	Daishi Line	Kawasaki (Kawasaki)	1944.06.01	At-grade	9,159		
KK26	Kojimashinden	Daishi Line	Kawasaki (Kawasaki)	1944.10.01	At-grade	20,890		
KK51	Mutsuura	Zushi Line	Kanazawa (Yokohama)	1943.02.15	At-grade	16,523		
KK52	Jimmuji	Zushi Line	Zushi	1931.04.01	At-grade	6,318		
KK53	Zushi·Hayama	Zushi Line	Zushi	1930.04.01	At-grade	23,143		
KK65	Shin-Ōtsu	Kurihama Line	Yokosuka	1942.12.01	At-grade	6,463		
KK66	Kita-Kurihama	Kurihama Line	Yokosuka	1942.12.01	At-grade	25,188		
KK67	Keikyū Kurihama	Kurihama Line	Yokosuka	1942.12.01	Elevated	44,158		
KK68	YRP Nobi	Kurihama Line	Yokosuka	1961.11.01	Elevated	20,965		
KK69	Keikyū Nagasawa	Kurihama Line	Yokosuka	1966.03.27	Elevated	7,678		
KK70	Tsukuihama	Kurihama Line	Yokosuka	1966.03.27	At-grade	6,483		
KK71	Miura Kaigan	Kurihama Line	Miura	1966.07.07	Elevated	12,233		
KK72	Misakiguchi	Kurihama Line	Miura	1975.04.26	At-grade, elevated	18,582		
Total						2,424,373	(Sum of system entries and exits)	
