= Suzukichō Station =

Railway station in Kawasaki, Kanagawa Prefecture, Japan

KK22 Suzukichō Station 鈴木町駅
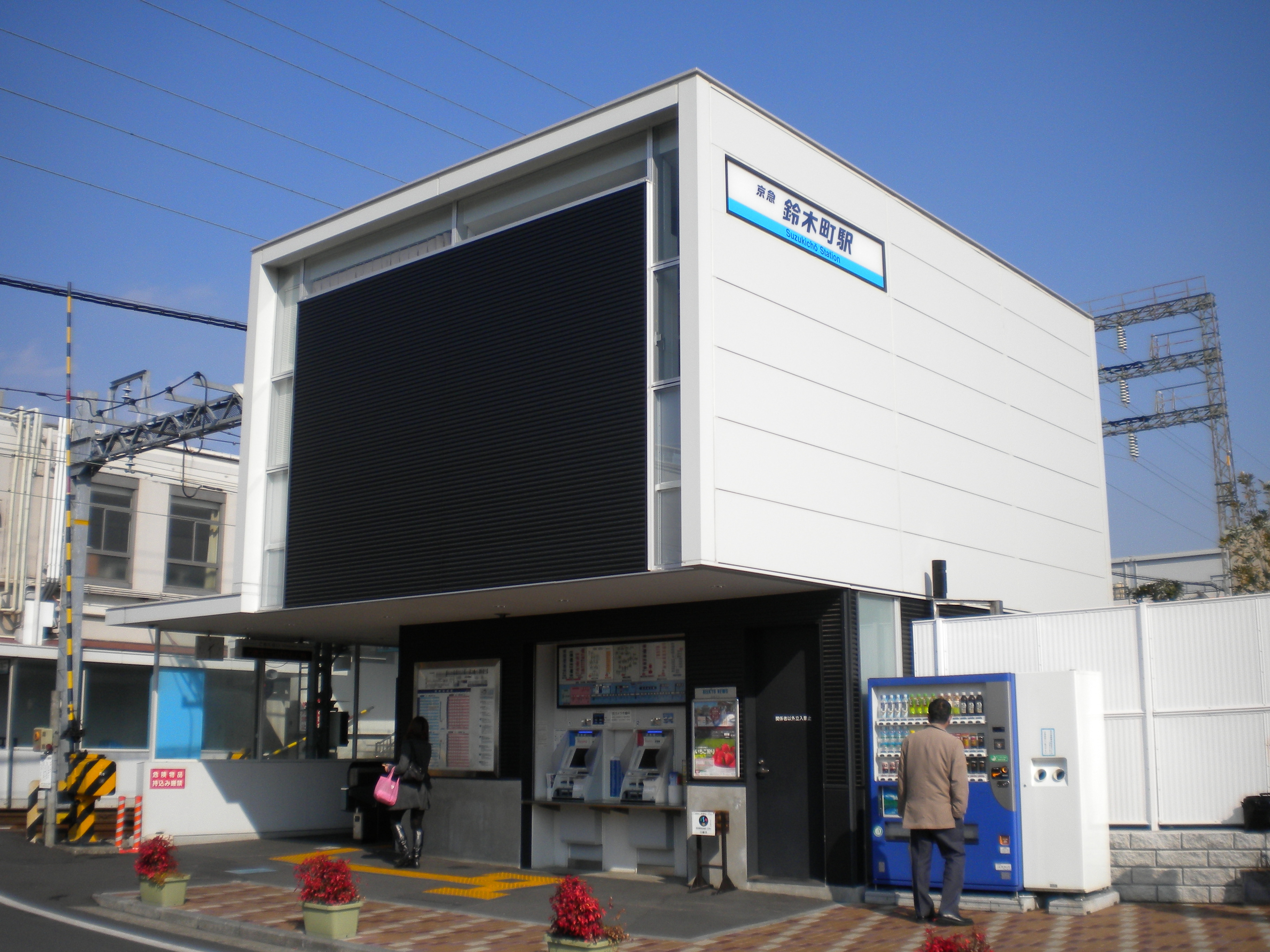
- Station building (February 2011)

General information
- Location: Suzukichō 2-chome, Kawasaki-ku, Kawasaki-shi, Kanagawa-ken 210-0801; Japan
- Coordinates: 35.5353°N 139.7207°E
- Operator: Keikyū
- Line: Daishi Line
- Distance: 2.0 km from Keikyū Kawasaki
- Platforms: 2 side platforms

Other information
- Station code: KK22
- Website: Official website

History
- Opened: December 10, 1929
- Former names: Ajinomoto-mae (味の素前) (until 1944)

Passengers
- FY2019: 11,229

Services
Preceding station	Keikyu	Following station
Minatochō KK21 towards Keikyū Kawasaki	Daishi Line	Kawasaki-Daishi KK23 towards Kojimashinden
Location
- Location within Kanagawa Prefecture Location within Japan

Suzukichō Station (鈴木町駅, Suzukichō-eki) is a passenger railway station located in Kawasaki-ku, Kawasaki, Kanagawa Prefecture, Japan, operated by the private railway operator Keikyū.

== Lines ==
Suzukichō Station is served by the Keikyū Daishi Line and is located 2.0 kilometers from the terminus of the line at Keikyū Kawasaki Station.

== Station layout ==
The station consists of two opposed side platforms connected by an underpass. There are two exits both on the west side of the station; the main exit is on the Kawasaki bound platform, with the Kojimashiden bound platform having a limited exit that is only open during the morning hours.

=== Platforms ===
1	Keikyū Daishi Line	for Kojimashinden
2	Keikyū Daishi Line	for Keikyū Kawasaki

== History ==
Suzukichō Station opened on December 10, 1929 as a station on the Keihin Electric Railway, the predecessor to the current Keihin Electric Express Railway. Initially named Ajinomoto-mae Station (味の素前駅, Ajinomoto-mae-eki) after the adjacent factory operated by the Ajinomoto Corporation, it was renamed to its present name on 20 October 1944, in homage of Saburosuke Suzuki, a founder of Ajinomoto. The station building was renovated in 2010.

Keikyū introduced station numbering to its stations on 21 October 2010; Suzukichō Station was assigned station number KK22.

== Passenger statistics ==
In fiscal 2019, the station was used by an average of 11,229 passengers daily.

The passenger figures for previous years are as shown below.

Fiscal year	daily average
2005	7,915
2010	8,114
2015	9,385

== Surrounding area ==
The station serves local factories in the area.
