= Higashimonzen Station =

Railway station in Kawasaki, Kanagawa Prefecture, Japan

KK24 Higashimonzen Station 東門前駅
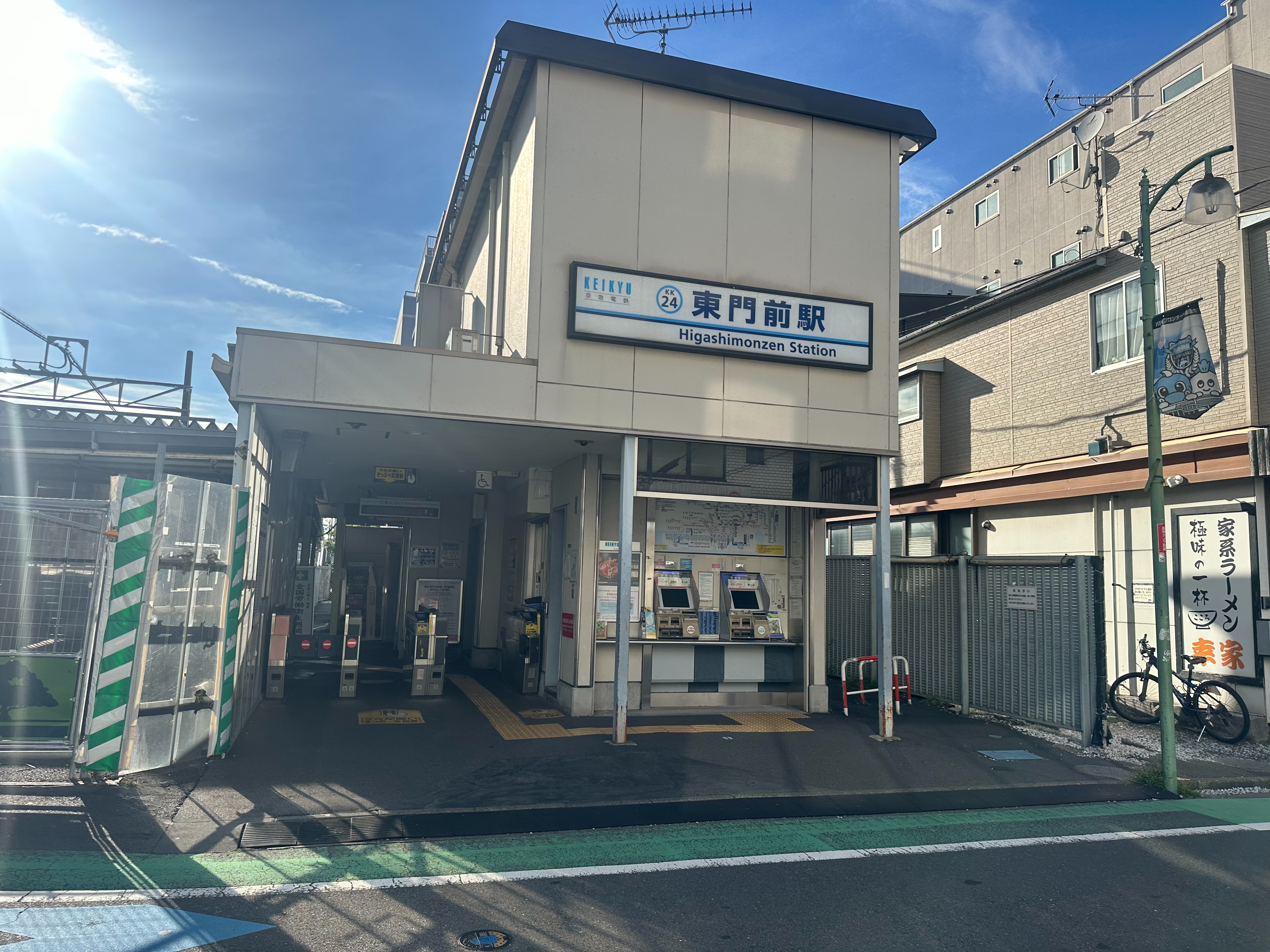
- Station building in October 2024

General information
- Location: 3-23 Nakaze, Kawasaki-ku, Kawasaki-shi, Kanagawa-ken 210-0818; Japan
- Coordinates: 35.5367°N 139.7340°E
- Operator: Keikyū
- Line: Daishi Line
- Distance: 3.2 km from Keikyū Kawasaki
- Platforms: 2 side platforms

Other information
- Station code: KK24
- Website: Official website

History
- Opened: August 15, 1925

Passengers
- FY2019: 13,062

Services
Preceding station	Keikyu	Following station
Kawasaki-Daishi KK23 towards Keikyū Kawasaki	Daishi Line	Daishibashi KK25 towards Kojimashinden
Location
- Location within Kanagawa Prefecture Location within Japan

Higashimonzen Station (東門前駅, Higashimonzen-eki) is a passenger railway station located in Kawasaki-ku, Kawasaki, Kanagawa Prefecture, Japan, operated by the private railway operator Keikyū.

== Lines ==
Higashimonzen Station is served by the Keikyū Daishi Line and is located 3.2 kilometers from the opposing terminus of the line at Keikyū Kawasaki Station.

== Station layout ==
The station consists of two opposed side platforms connected by a level crossing.

=== Platforms ===
1	Keikyū Daishi Line	for Kojimashinden
2	Keikyū Daishi Line	for Keikyū Kawasaki

== History ==
Higashimonzen Station opened on August 15, 1925 as a station on the Kaigan Electric Transport. The station was closed on December 1, 1937, but reopened as a station on June 1, 1944 under the Tokyu Corporation. Keihin Electric Express Railway took over the station from June 1, 1948 after it was spun off from Tokyu.

Keikyū introduced station numbering to its stations on 21 October 2010; Higashimonzen Station was assigned station number KK24.

=== Future plans ===
It is planned to move the station underground to reduce the number of level crossings on the line, with construction completing around 2023.

== Passenger statistics ==
In fiscal 2019, the station was used by an average of 13,062 passengers daily.

The passenger figures for previous years are as shown below.

Fiscal year	daily average
2005	6,548
2010	11,208
2015	12,506

== Surrounding area ==
- Japan National Route 409
- Kawasaki Ward Office Daishi Branch
- Kawasaki City Higashimonzen Elementary School
- Kawasaki City Daishi Elementary School

== See also ==
- List of railway stations in Japan
