= Daishibashi Station =

Railway station in Kawasaki, Kanagawa Prefecture, Japan

KK25 Daishibashi Station 大師橋駅
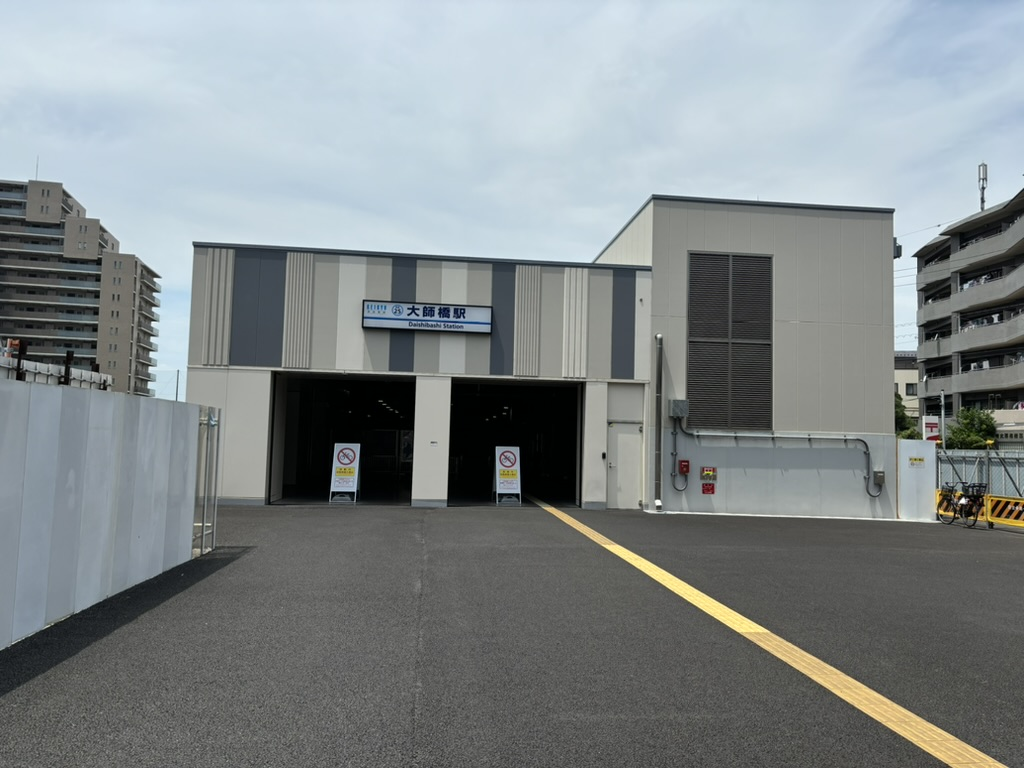
- The station entrance (July 2024)

General information
- Location: 2-4-25 Daishigawara, Kawasaki-ku, Kawasaki-shi, Kanagawaken 210-0811; Japan
- Coordinates: 35°32′12.08″N 139°44′27.09″E
- Operator: Keikyū
- Line: Daishi Line
- Distance: 3.8 km from Keikyū Kawasaki
- Platforms: 2 side platform

Other information
- Station code: KK25
- Website: Official website

History
- Opened: June 1, 1944
- Former names: Sangyōdōro Station

Passengers
- FY2019: 10,803

Services
Preceding station	Keikyu	Following station
Higashimonzen KK24 towards Keikyū Kawasaki	Daishi Line	Kojimashinden KK26 Terminus
Location
- Location within Kanagawa Prefecture Location within Japan

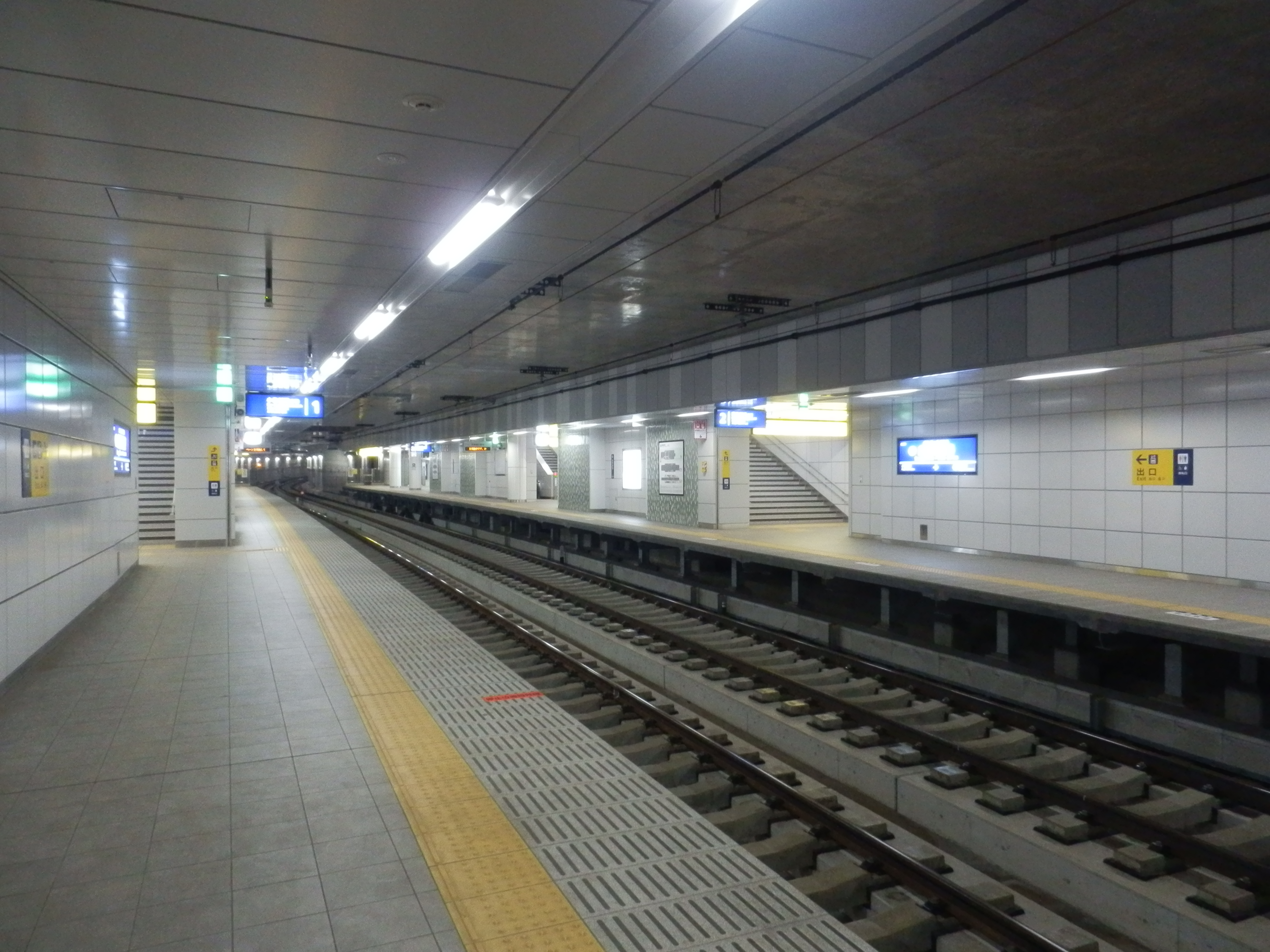
Station platforms in April 2019

Daishibashi Station (大師橋駅, Daishibashi-eki) is a passenger railway station located in Kawasaki-ku, Kawasaki, Kanagawa Prefecture, Japan, operated by the private railway company Keikyū.

== Lines ==
Daishibashi Station is served by the Keikyū Daishi Line and is located 3.8 kilometers from the terminus of the line at Keikyū Kawasaki Station.

== Station layout ==
The station consists of two underground opposed side platforms serving two tracks.

=== Platforms ===
1	Keikyū Daishi Line	for Kojimashinden
2	Keikyū Daishi Line	for Keikyū Kawasaki

=== Former station ===
The former above-ground station consisted of two side platform serving two tracks.

== History ==
Daishibashi Station opened as Sangyōdōro Station (産業道路駅, Sangyōdōro-eki) on June 1, 1944, under the Tokyu Corporation. Keihin Electric Express Railway took over the station from June 1, 1948, after it was spun off from Tokyu. The station building was rebuilt on November 30, 1968. The station was built with a third track for terminating trains, but it was removed during 1990.

The station was moved underground on March 2, 2019, to reduce traffic congestion from level crossings on Sanayo-doro Avenue.

Keikyū introduced station numbering to its stations on October 21, 2010; Daishibashi Station was assigned station number KK25.

On March 14, 2020, the station was renamed to Daishibashi Station (大師橋駅, Daishibashi-eki). The name was changed because of the station's adjacency to the Daishi Bridge linking Kawasaki City to Tokyo's Ōta Ward.

== Passenger statistics ==
In fiscal 2019, the station was used by an average of 10,803 passengers daily.

The passenger figures for previous years are as shown below.

Fiscal year	daily average
2005	8,569
2010	9,159
2015	9,187

== Surrounding area ==
- Kawasaki City Daishi Junior High School
- Kawasaki City Tonomachi Elementary School
- Kawasaki Daishi Kaigan Post Office

== See also ==
- List of railway stations in Japan
