= Minatochō Station =

Railway station in Kawasaki, Kanagawa Prefecture, Japan

KK21 Minatochō Station 港町駅
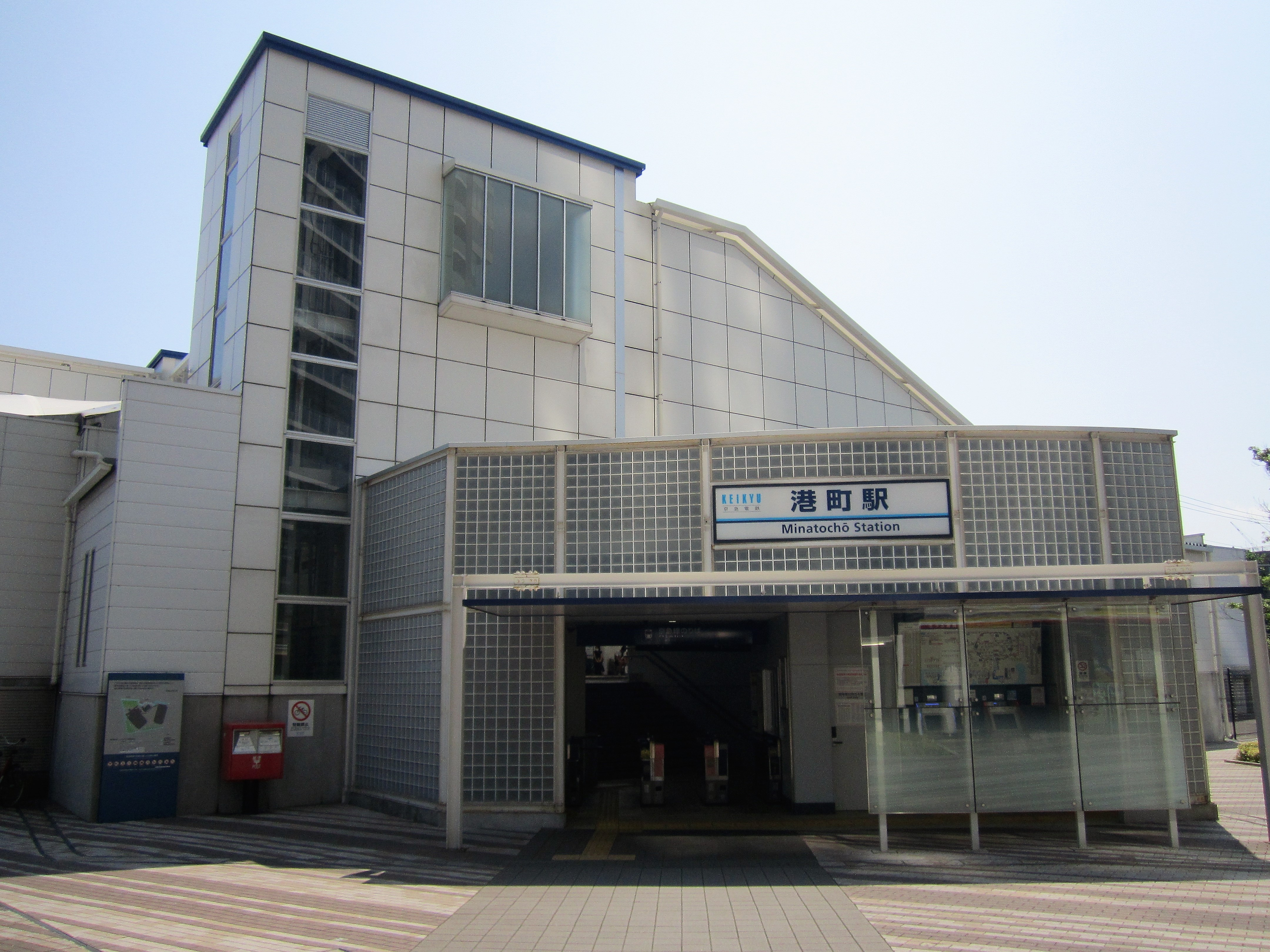
- Minatochō Station, North Exit in August 2019

General information
- Location: Minatochō 1-chome, Kawasaki-ku, Kawasaki-shi, Kanagawa-ken 210-0807; Japan
- Coordinates: 35.5348°N 139.7125°E
- Operator: Keikyū
- Line: Daishi Line
- Distance: 2.1 km from Keikyū Kawasaki
- Platforms: 2 side platforms
- Connections: Bus stop

Other information
- Station code: KK21
- Website: Official website

History
- Opened: March 21, 1932

Passengers
- FY2019: 7,963

Services
Preceding station	Keikyu	Following station
Keikyū Kawasaki KK20 Terminus	Daishi Line	Suzukichō KK22 towards Kojimashinden
Location
- Location within Kanagawa Prefecture Location within Japan

Minatochō Station (港町駅, Minatochō-eki) is a passenger railway station located in Kawasaki-ku, Kawasaki, Kanagawa Prefecture, Japan, operated by the private railway company Keikyū.

== Lines ==
Minatochō Station is served by the Keikyū Daishi Line and is located 2.1 kilometers from the terminus of the line at Keikyū Kawasaki Station.

== Station layout ==
Minatochō Station has two opposed side platforms connected by a footbridge.

=== Platforms ===
1	Keikyū Daishi Line	for Kojimashinden
2	Keikyū Daishi Line	for Keikyū Kawasaki

== History ==
Minatochō Station opened on 21 March 1932 as a temporary stop on the Keihin Electric Railway. It was the predecessor to the current Keihin Electric Express Railway. Initially it was located 300 metres (980 ft) further away from Keikyū Kawasaki Station than the present location. It renamed to its present name on February 1, 1944. On October 18, 1956, the station was moved to its present address. In April 1977, the former level crossing was eliminated by the completion of an overpass.

Keikyū introduced station numbering to its stations on 21 October 2010; Minatochō Station was assigned station number KK21.

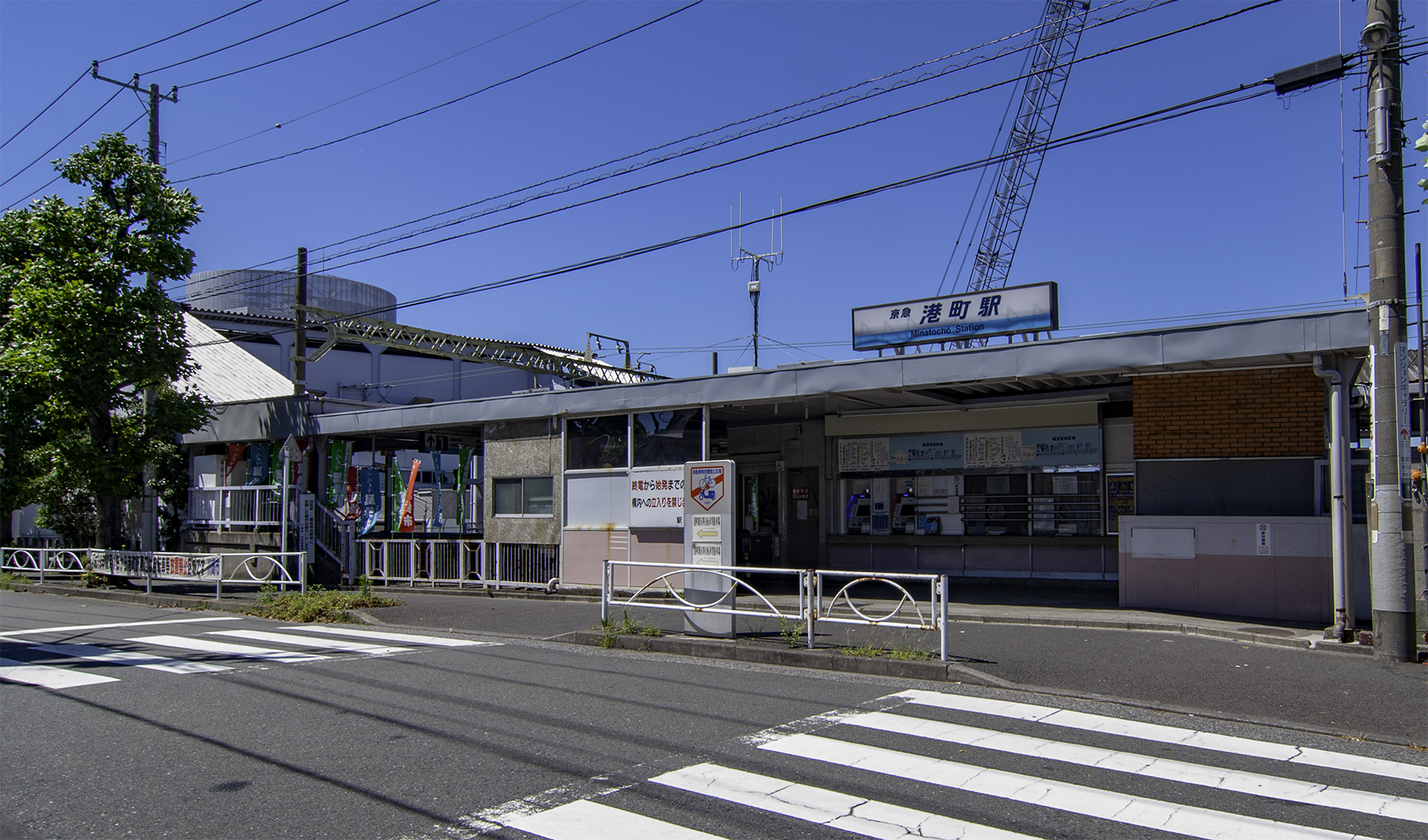
old station building

== Passenger statistics ==
In fiscal 2019, the station was used by an average of 7,963 passengers daily.

The passenger figures for previous years are as shown below.

Fiscal year	daily average
2005	4,202
2010	3,222
2015	6,431

== Surrounding area ==
- Japan National Route 409
- Kawasaki Racecourse
- Kawasaki City Asahicho Elementary School
- Kawasaki City Minatocho Park

== See also ==
- List of railway stations in Japan
