= Kawasaki-ku =

Kawasaki 川崎区
- Ward
- Kawasaki Ward
- Seal

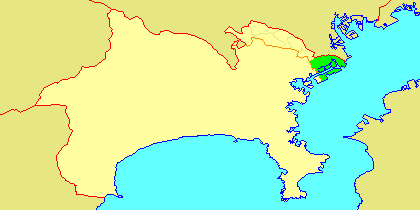
- Location of Kawasaki in Kanagawa

- Coordinates: 35°31′46″N 139°42′12″E
- Country: Japan
- Region: Kantō
- Prefecture: Kanagawa
- City: Kawasaki
- Established: April 1, 1972

Area
  - Total: 39.21 km^{2} (15.14 sq mi)

Population (March 2010)
  - Total: 216,826
  - Density: 5,530/km^{2} (14,300/sq mi)
- Time zone: UTC+9 (Japan Standard Time)
- Address: 8-banchi Higashida, Kawasaki-ku Kawasaki-shi, Kanagawa-ken; 210-8570
- Website: Kawasaki Ward Office

Kawasaki-ku (川崎区) is one of the seven wards of the city of Kawasaki in Kanagawa Prefecture, Japan. As of 2010, the ward had an estimated population of 216,826 and a density of 5,530 persons per km^{2}. The total area was 39.21 square kilometres (15.14 sq mi). Kawasaki-ku has the home to the second largest Koreatown in Japan.

== Geography ==
Kawasaki Ward is located in northeastern Kanagawa Prefecture, in the northeast portion of the city of Kawasaki, bordering on the Tama River and Tokyo to the north and Tokyo Bay to the south and east. Much of the land area of the Ward is reclaimed land

=== Surrounding municipalities ===
- Saiwai-ku, Kawasaki
- Tsurumi-ku, Yokohama
- Ōta-ku, Tokyo

== History ==
Under the Nara period Ritsuryō system, what is now Kawasaki Ward became part of Tachibana District Musashi Province. In the Edo period, it was administered as tenryō territory controlled directly by the Tokugawa shogunate, but administered through various hatamoto, and prospered as Kawasaki-juku, a post station on the Tokaido highway connecting Edo with Kyoto. After the Meiji Restoration, the area urbanized with the development of Kawasaki Station on the Tokaido Main Line and became a center for heavy industry. The area was largely destroyed by the Great Kanto earthquake of 1923 and during American bombing during World War II. Kawasaki Ward was established with the division of the city of Kawasaki into wards on April 1, 1972. Long associated with grime, labor unrest, organized crime and pollution-related diseases, the local government undertook extensive efforts in the 1990s to revamp the area image.

== Economy ==
The economy of Kawasaki Ward continues to be dominated by industry.

- Fuji Electric
- JFE Steel - Operates several major plants near Tokyo Bay. JFE's main plant for eastern Japan is located on the border of Kawasaki-ku and Tsurumi-ku, Yokohama.
- Mitsubishi Chemical
- Showa Electric
- Showa Shell Oil
- Tokyo Electric Power
- Kao Corporation
- Ajinomoto

== Education ==
The Kawasaki City Board of Education (川崎市育委員会) operates municipal elementary and junior high schools, as well as Kawasaki High School and Affiliated Junior High School.

Municipal junior high schools:

- Daishi (大師中学校)
- Fujimi (富士見中学校)
- Kawanakajima (川中島中学校)
- Kawasaki JHS (川崎中学校)
- Affiliated Junior High School of Kawasaki HS (川崎高等学校附属中学校)
- Kyomachi (京町中学校)
- Minami Daishi (南大師中学校)
- Rinko (臨港中学校)
- Sakuramoto (桜本中学校)
- Tajima (田島中学校)
- Watarida (渡田中学校)

Municipal elementary schools:

- Asada (浅田小学校)
- Asahicho (旭町小学校)
- Daishi (大師小学校)
- Fujisaki (藤崎小学校)
- Higashi Monzen (東門前小学校)
- Higashi Oda (東小田小学校)
- Higashi Oshima (東大島小学校)
- Kawanakajima (川中島小学校)
- Kawasaki (川崎小学校)
- Kyomachi (京町小学校)
- Miyamae (宮前小学校)
- Mukai (向小学校)
- Oda (小田小学校)
- Oshima (大島小学校)
- Sakura (さくら小学校)
- Shincho (新町小学校)
- Tajima (田島小学校)
- Tonomachi (殿町小学校)
- Watarida (渡田小学校)
- Yotsuya (四谷小学校)

Former elementary schools:

- Higashi Sakuramoto (東桜本小学校) - Closed on March 31, 2010 (Heisei 22)
- Sakuramoto (桜本小学校) - Closed on March 31, 2010 (Heisei 22)

There is a North Korean school, Kawasaki Korean Primary School (川崎朝鮮初級学校).

== Transportation ==
=== Rail ===
- JR East – Tokaido Main Line
  - Kawasaki Station
- JR East – Nambu Line
  - Kawasaki Station
- JR East – Nambu Branch Line
  - Hatchōnawate - Kawasaki-Shimmachi - Hama-Kawasaki
- JR East – Tsurumi Line
  - Musashi-Shiraishi Station - Hama-Kawasaki - Shōwa - Ōgimachi
- JR East – Tsurumi Branch Line
  - Ōkawa
- Keihin Electric Express Railway - Keikyū Main Line
  - Keikyū Kawasaki - Hatchōnawate
- Keihin Electric Express Railway - Keikyū Daishi Line
  - Keikyū Kawasaki - Minatochō - Suzukichō - Kawasaki-Daishi - Higashi-Monzen - Daishibashi - Kojimashinden
- Tōkaidō Freight Line (freight only)
- Kanagawa Rinkai Railway (freight only)

=== Road ===
- Tokyo Bay Aqua-Line
- Bayshore Route
- Japan National Route 15 (Dai-ichi Keihin)
- Japan National Route 132
- Route 357 (Japan)
- Route 409 (Japan)
- Kanagawa Prefectural Road 1 (Shuto Expressway)
- Kanagawa Prefectural Road 6 (Shuto Expressway)
- Kanagawa Prefectural Road 9
- Kanagawa Prefectural Road 101
- Kanagawa Prefectural Road 140

== Local attractions ==
- Kawasaki Daishi

== Noted people from Kawasaki Ward ==
- Kaoru Abe, musician
- Hirokazu Ibata, professional baseball player
- Kyu Sakamoto, singer
