= Keikyū Tsurumi Station =

Railway station in Yokohama, Japan

KK29 Keikyū Tsurumi Station 京急鶴見駅
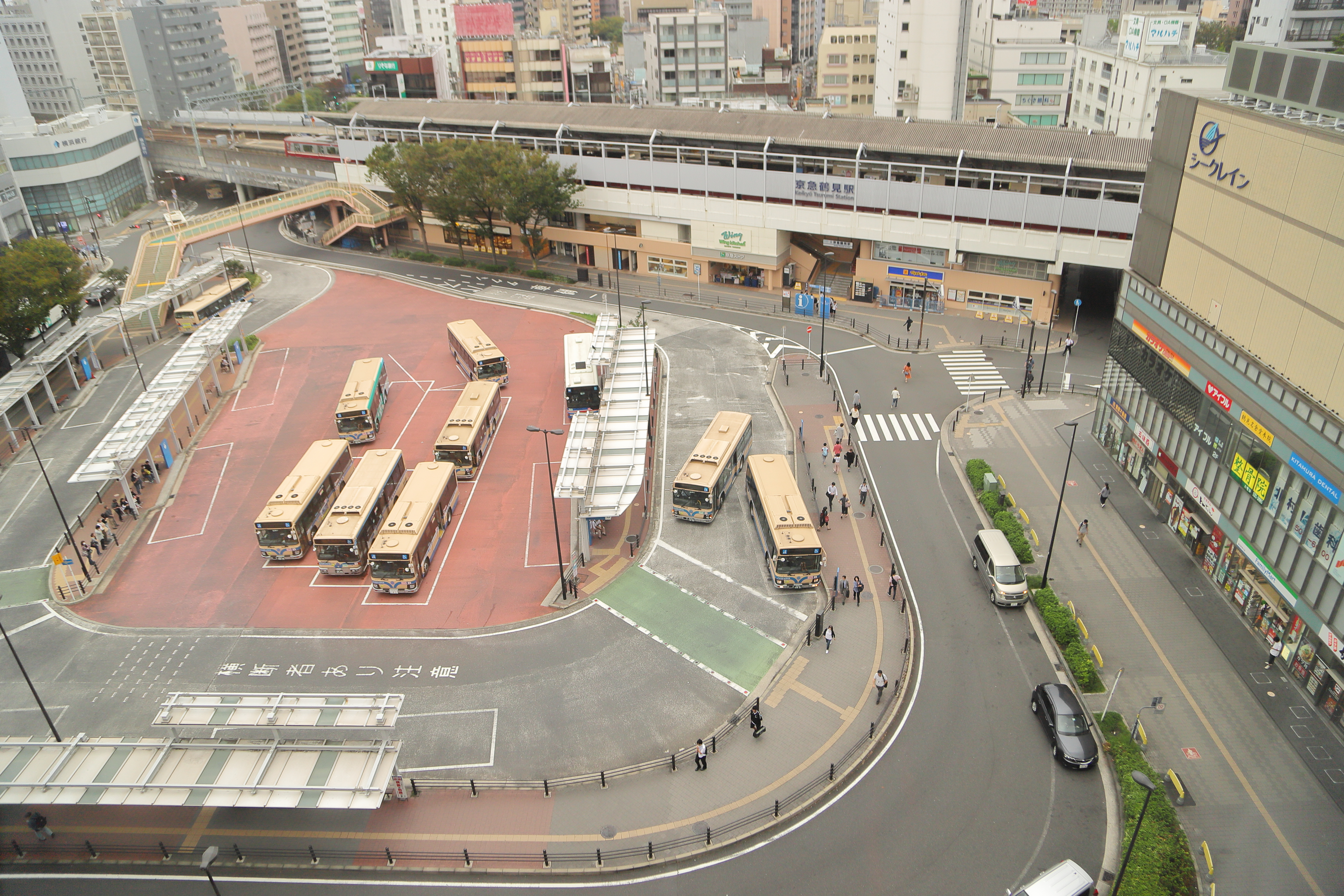
- Keikyū Tsurumi Station

General information
- Location: 1 Tsurumi-chūō, Tsurumi-ku, Yokohama-shi, Kanagawa-ken 230-0051; Japan
- Coordinates: 35.5070°N 139.6779°E
- Operator: Keikyū
- Line: Keikyū Main Line
- Distance: 15.3 km from Shinagawa
- Platforms: 1 island + 1 side platforms
- Connections: Bus stop

Other information
- Station code: KK29
- Website: Official website

History
- Opened: December 24, 1905
- Former names: Keihin Tsurumi (until 1987)

Passengers
- 2019: 33,348 daily

Services
Preceding station	Keikyu	Following station
Kanagawa-shimmachi KK34 towards Kanazawa-hakkei	Main Line Express	Keikyū Kawasaki KK20 towards Keikyū Kamata
Kagetsu-sōjiji KK30 towards Uraga	Main Line Local	Tsurumi-ichiba KK28 towards Shinagawa
Location
- Location within Kanagawa Prefecture Location within Japan

Keikyū Tsurumi Station (京急鶴見駅, Keikyū Tsurumi-eki) is a passenger railway station located in Tsurumi-ku, Yokohama, Kanagawa Prefecture, Japan, operated by the private railway company Keikyū.

== Lines ==
Keikyū Tsurumi Station is served by the Keikyū Main Line and is located 15.3 kilometers from the terminus of the line at Shinagawa Station in Tokyo.

== Station layout ==
The station consists of an island platform and a side platform serving three elevated tracks..The platforms are on the third floor of the station building, with the wicket gates and main concourse on the second floor.

== Station layout ==
1	■ Keikyū Main Line	for Yokohama, Zushi·Hayama, Uraga, Misakiguchi
2, 3	■ Keikyū Main Line	for Keikyū Kamata, Haneda Airport, and Shinagawa

== History ==
Keikyū Tsurumi Station opened on December 24, 1905 as a temporary stop on the Keihin Electric Railway. It was elevated to a full station on November 1, 1925 and renamed Keihin Tsurumi Station (京浜鶴見駅, Keihin Tsurumi-eki). It was renamed to its present name on 1 June 1987.

Keikyū introduced station numbering to its stations on 21 October 2010; Keikyū Tsurumi Station was assigned station number KK29.

== Passenger statistics ==
In fiscal 2019, the station was used by an average of 33,348 passengers daily.

The passenger figures for previous years are as shown below.

Fiscal year	daily average
2005	27,749
2010	28,156
2015	31,068

== Surrounding area ==
- Tsurumi Station
- Tsurumi Ward Office
- Tsurumi Shrine

== See also ==
- List of railway stations in Japan
