= Kawasaki-Daishi Station =

Railway station in Kawasaki, Kanagawa Prefecture, Japan

KK23 Kawasaki-Daishi Station 川崎大師駅
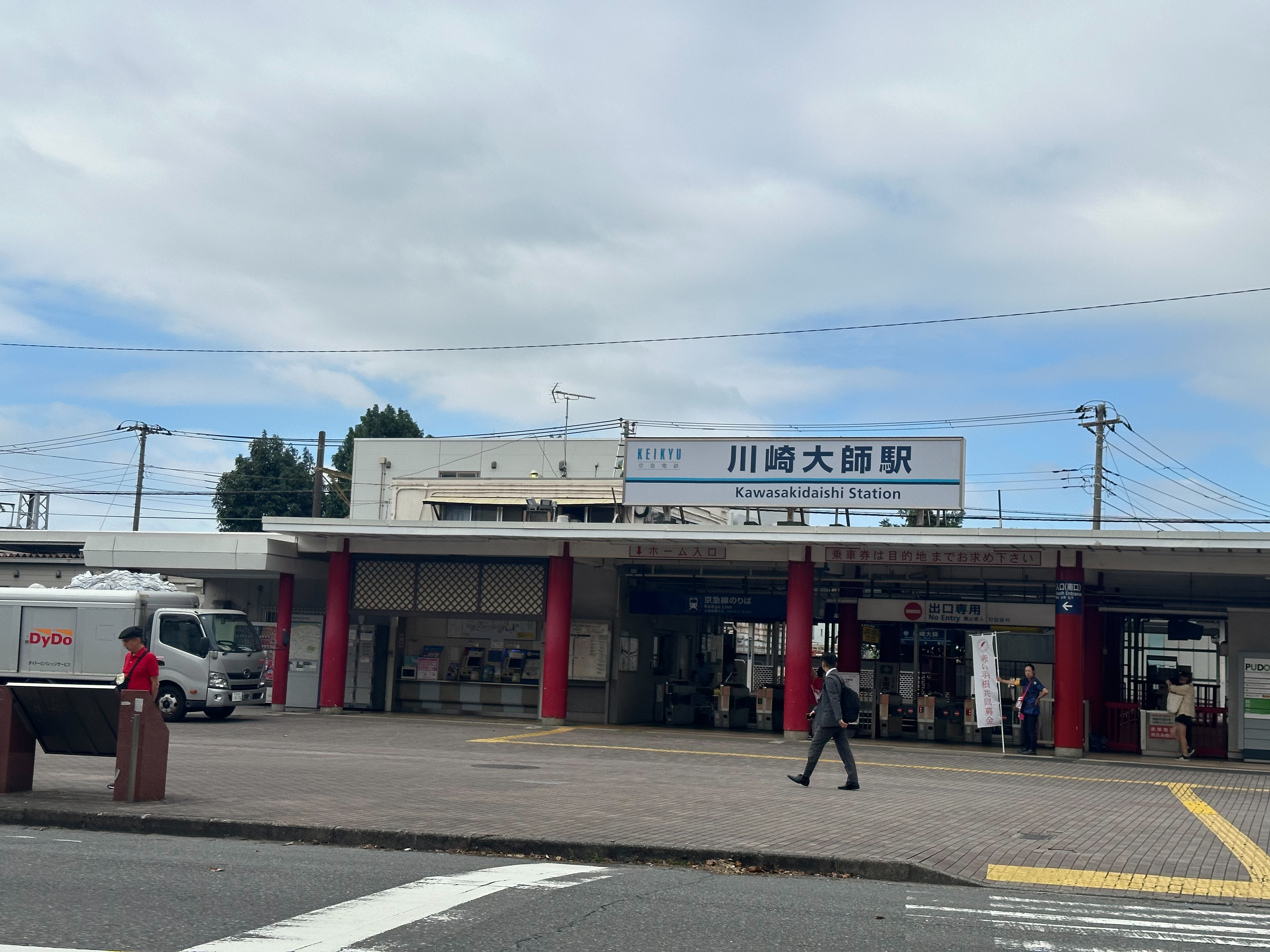
- Station building (October 2024)

General information
- Location: 1-18-1 Daishi-ekimae, Kawasaki-ku, Kawasaki-shi, Kanagawa-ken 210-0802; Japan
- Coordinates: 35.5358°N 139.7258°E
- Operator: Keikyū
- Line: Daishi Line
- Distance: 2.5 km from Keikyū Kawasaki
- Platforms: 2 side platforms

Other information
- Station code: KK23
- Website: Official website

History
- Opened: January 21, 1899
- Former names: Daishi (大師) (until 1925)

Passengers
- FY2019: 18,231

Services
Preceding station	Keikyu	Following station
Suzukichō KK22 towards Keikyū Kawasaki	Daishi Line	Higashimonzen KK24 towards Kojimashinden
Location
- Location within Kanagawa Prefecture Location within Japan

Kawasaki-Daishi Station (川崎大師駅, Kawasaki-Daishi-eki) is a passenger railway station located in Kawasaki-ku, Kawasaki, Kanagawa Prefecture, Japan, operated by the private railway operator Keikyū.

== Lines ==
Kawasaki-Daishi Station is served by the Keikyū Daishi Line and is located 2.5 kilometers (1.6 mi) from the terminus of the line at Keikyū Kawasaki Station.

== Station layout ==
The station consists of two opposed side platforms connected by an underpass. There are two exits, one on the south side serving the Keikyū Kawasaki bound platform and one serving the Kojimashinden bound platform on the northeast corner.

=== Platforms ===
1	Keikyū Daishi Line	for Kojimashinden
2	Keikyū Daishi Line	for Keikyū Kawasaki

== History ==
Kawasaki-Daishi opened on 21 January 1899 as Daishi Station (大師駅) on the Daishi Railway, the predecessor to the current Keikyū. It was renamed Kawasaki-Daishi Station in November 1925.

Keikyū introduced station numbering to its stations on 21 October 2010; Kawasaki-Daishi Station was assigned station number KK22.

== Future plans ==
There are plans to move the station underground.

== Passenger statistics ==
In fiscal 2019, the station was used by an average of 18,231 passengers daily.

The passenger figures for previous years are as shown below.

Fiscal year	daily average
2005	16,363
2010	16,680
2015	16,898

== Surrounding area ==
The station serves the nearby Kawasaki Daishi temple.

== See also ==
- List of railway stations in Japan
