= Rokugōdote Station =

Railway station in Tokyo, Japan

Coordinates: 35.5407°N 139.7078°E

KK19 Rokugōdote Station 六郷土手駅
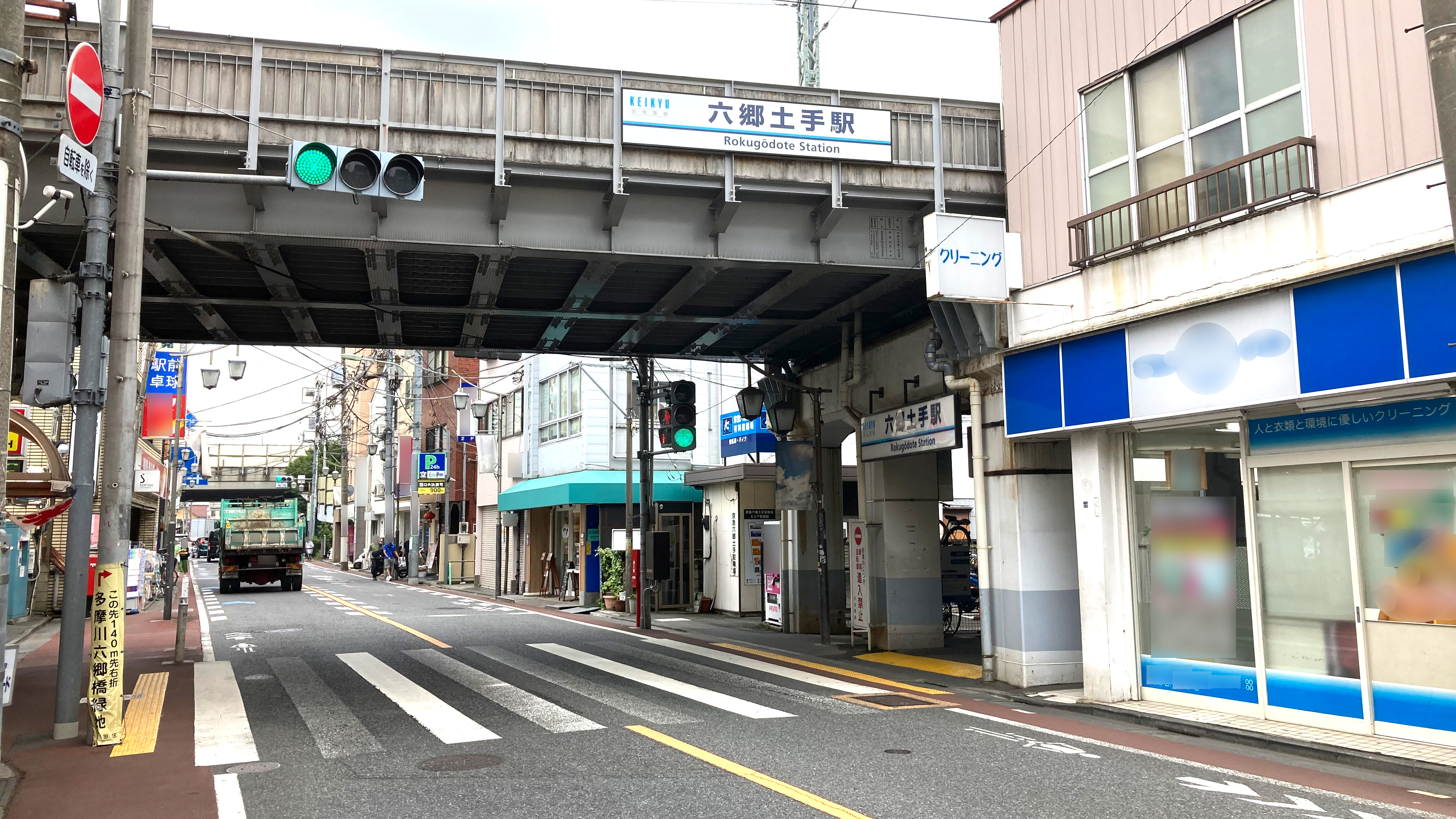
- Entrance to elevated station in June 2021

General information
- Location: Ota, Tokyo; Japan
- Operator: Keikyu
- Line: Keikyū Main Line

Construction
- Structure type: Elevated
- Accessible: Yes

History
- Opened: 1906

Services
Preceding station	Keikyu	Following station
Keikyū Kawasaki KK20 towards Uraga	Main Line Local	Zōshiki KK18 towards Shinagawa
Location

Rokugōdote Station (六郷土手駅, Rokugōdote-eki) is a railway station in Ōta, Tokyo, Japan. It is the southernmost railway station of Tokyo's special ward area.

== Lines ==
- Keikyu
  - Main Line

== Layout ==
This elevated station consists of two side platforms serving two tracks.

1	■ Keikyū Main Line	for Yokohama, Zushi·Hayama, Uraga, and Keikyū Kurihama
2	■ Keikyū Main Line	for Keikyū Kamata, Haneda Airport, and Shinagawa

== History ==
Keikyu introduced station numbering to its stations on 21 October 2010; Rokugōdote Station was assigned station number KK19.
