= Keikyū Daishi Line =

Railway line in Kawasaki, Kanagawa prefecture, Japan

Keikyu Daishi Line

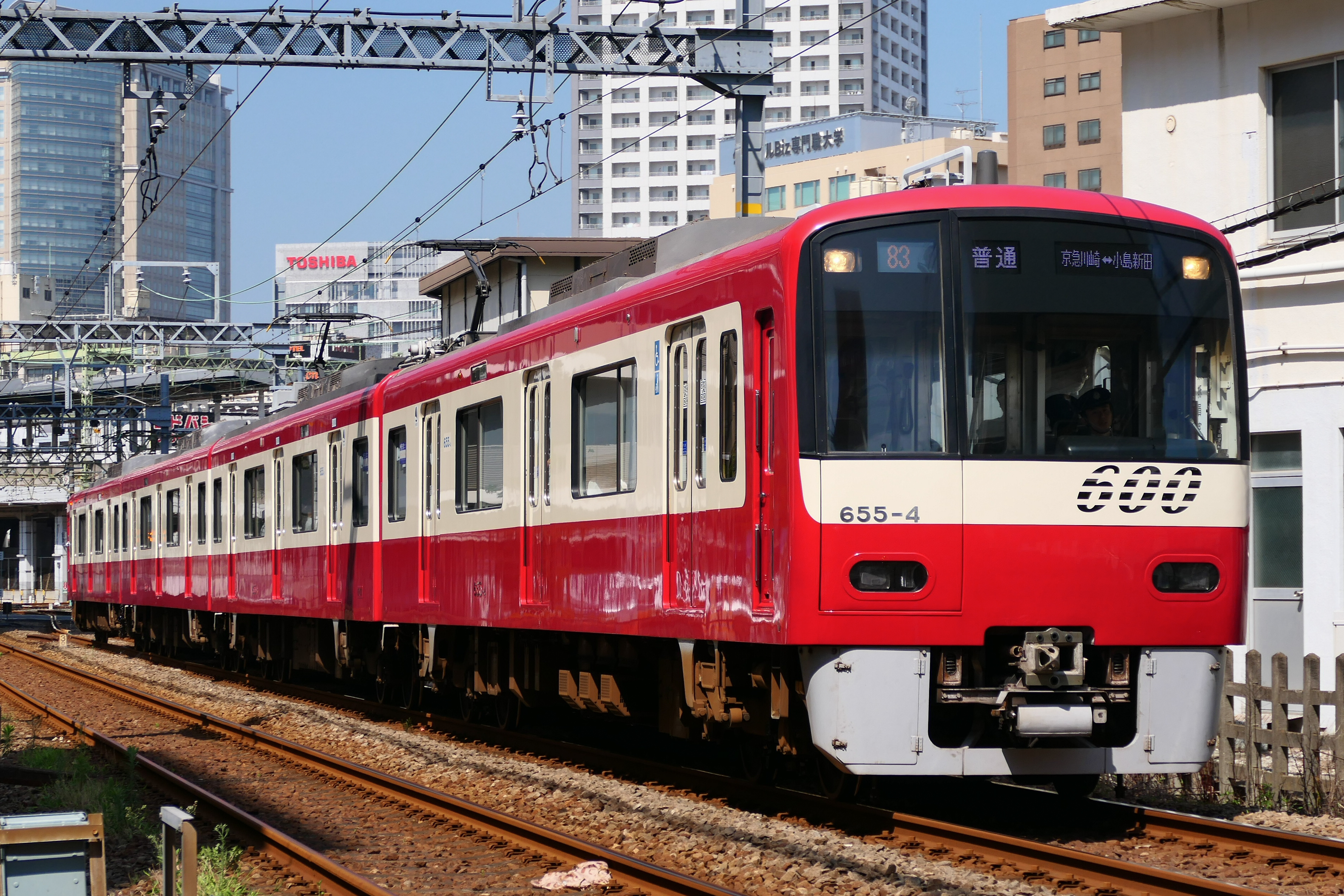
- A 600 series 4-car set in July 2023

Overview
- Native name: 京急大師線
- Owner: Keikyu
- Locale: Kawasaki, Kanagawa
- Termini: Keikyū Kawasaki; Kojimashinden
- Stations: 7

Service
- Type: Commuter rail

History
- Opened: 21 January 1899; 127 years ago

Technical
- Line length: 4.5 km (2.8 mi)
- Number of tracks: 2
- Track gauge: 1,435 mm (4 ft 8 1/2 in) standard gauge
- Electrification: 1,500 V DC (overhead catenary)
- Operating speed: 60 km/h (35 mph)
- Signalling: Automatic closed block signalling
- Train protection system: C-ATS

The Keikyu Daishi Line (Japanese: 京急大師線, Hepburn: Keikyū Daishi-sen) is a 4.5-kilometre (2.8 mi) private railway line in Japan, operated by Keikyū. It connects Keikyu Kawasaki Station and Kojimashinden Station, both located in Kawasaki-ku, Kawasaki.

== History ==
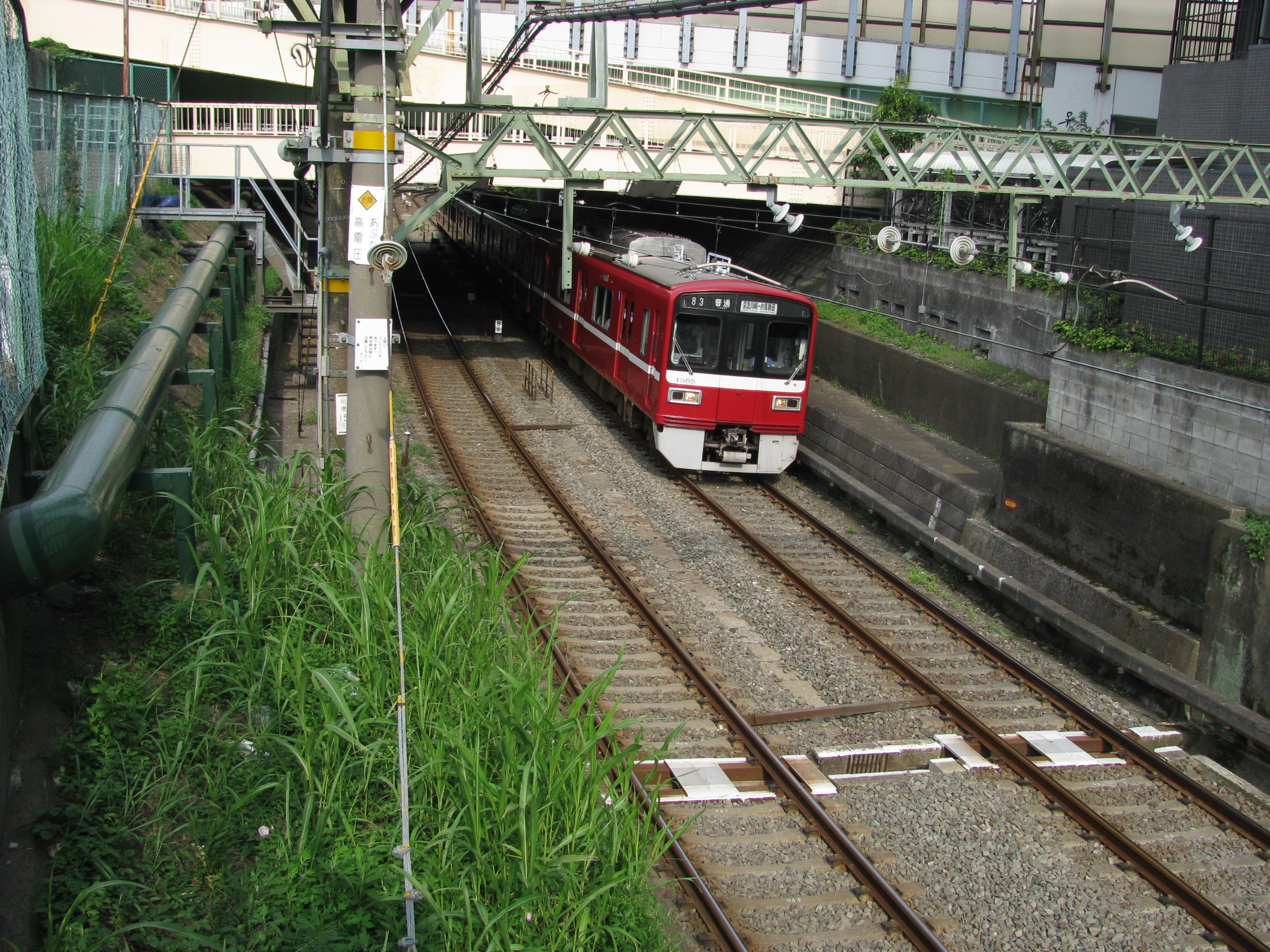
A 1500 series train passing the abandoned Rokugōbashi Station in July 2011

The line was opened on 21 January 1899 by the Daishi Electric Railway (大師電気鉄道) between Kawasaki Station and Daishi Station, to transport people to the Kawasaki Daishi. Electrified at 600 V DC, it is the third electric railway in Japan. The Kawasaki Station at the time of opening was located about 800 meters away from the modern Kawasaki Station. It is said that this was due to opposition from the rickshaw operators. Later, the initial Kawasaki Station was renamed to Rokugōbashi Station in 1902. The company was renamed Keihin Electric Railway (京浜電気鉄道) on 25 April 1899. The line was double-tracked over its entire length from 29 November the same year, and extended from Rokugōbashi Station to the present-day Kawasaki Station on 1 September 1902. In 1904, the track gauge of the line was changed to 1,372 mm from the 1,435 mm standard gauge in order to allow through service with the Tokyo streetcar. This change was reverted in the 1930s to allow through service with the Shōnan Electric Railway (湘南電気鉄道). While the area around the line used to be filled with farmlands and villages, it became an industrial zone by the Pacific War.

After the outbreak of the Pacific War, the line was operated by Dai-Tokyu. Due to increasing demand from the military factories in the region, both the city of Kawasaki and the Dai-Tokyu applied for construction permits to extend the line. It was decided that the two parties each build half of the extension, with Dai-Tokyu extending the line clockwards from Kawasaki Daishi Station and the city extending the line anti-clockwise from Kawasaki Station. Both sections connected at Sakuramoto Station, forming a loop-like line. The construction work by Dai-Tokyu was completed on 7 January 1945, and the work by the city was completed on 6 December of the same year. After the dissolution of the Dai-Tokyu, Keikyu took over the line in 1948. The overhead line voltage was raised from the original 600 V DC to 1,500 V DC on 16 March 1951 except for the Shiohama to Sakuramoto section. In 1952, Keikyu transferred the section between Shiohama Station and Sakuramoto Station to the Kawasaki City Tram. The service for the section from Kojimashinden Station to Shiohama was suspended in 1964, and officially abolished in 1970. Works to remove level crossing between Higashimonzen Station and Kojimashinden by moving the line underground was completed in 2019. The same was planned for the section from Suzukichō Station, but the plan was placed on hold in 2021 due to the COVID-19 pandemic.

== Operations ==
=== Services ===
Keikyu Daishi Line services are operated only by four-car electric multiple unit (EMU) trains, stopping at all stations between Keikyu Kawasaki and Kojimashinden. During the weekday off-peak, trains run at 10-minute intervals, increased to 5-minute intervals during the morning and evening peaks. During the weekends and holidays, trains run at 10-minute intervals, with decreased frequency during the first two hours and the last three hours.

== Infrastructure ==
=== Stations ===
No.	Name	Distance in km (mi)	Transfers
KK20	Keikyu Kawasaki 京急川崎	0 (0)	Main Line; Keihin–Tōhoku Line (Kawasaki: JK16); Nambu Line (Kawasaki: JN01); Tōkaidō Line (Kawasaki: JT04)
KK21	Minatochō 港町	1.2 (0.75)	
KK22	Suzukichō 鈴木町	2.0 (1.2)	
KK23	Kawasaki-Daishi 川崎大師	2.5 (1.6)	
KK24	Higashimonzen 東門前	3.2 (2.0)	
KK25	Daishibashi 大師橋	3.8 (2.4)	
KK26	Kojimashinden 小島新	4.5 (2.8)	

=== Rolling stock ===
Services on the line are operated using four-car Keikyu N1000 series formations and Keikyu 600 series formations.

== See also ==
- List of railway lines in Japan
