= Kojimashinden Station =

Railway station in Kawasaki, Kanagawa Prefecture, Japan

KK26 Kojimashinden Station 小島新田駅
- Station building in January 2026

General information
- Location: Tamachi 2-13, Kawasaki-ku, Kawasaki-shi, Kanagawa-ken 210-0822; Japan
- Coordinates: 35°32′05.00″N 139°44′53.00″E
- Operator: Keikyū
- Line: Daishi Line
- Distance: 4.5 km from Keikyū Kawasaki
- Platforms: 1 island platform

Other information
- Station code: KK26
- Website: Official website

History
- Opened: October 1, 1944

Passengers
- FY2019: 22,743

Services
Preceding station	Keikyu	Following station
Daishibashi KK25 towards Keikyū Kawasaki	Daishi Line	Terminus
Location
- Location within Kanagawa Prefecture Location within Japan

Station platforms in January 2026

Kojimashinden Station (小島新田駅, Kojimashinden-eki) is a passenger railway station located in Kawasaki-ku, Kawasaki, Kanagawa Prefecture, Japan, operated by the private railway operator Keikyū.

== Lines ==
Kojimashinden Station is served by the Keikyū Daishi Line and is located 4.5 kilometers (2.8 mi) from the opposing terminus of the line at Keikyū Kawasaki Station.

== Station layout ==
The station consists of a single island platform serving two terminus tracks.

=== Platforms ===
1・2	Keikyū Daishi Line	for Kawasaki-Daishi, Keikyū Kawasaki

== History ==
Kojimashinden Station opened on 1 October 1944 under the Tokyu Corporation. Keihin Electric Express Railway took over the station from 1 June 1948 after it was spun off from Tokyu.

On 25 March 1964 it became the terminal of the Daishi Line when Shiohama Station was closed. At that time, the station was moved 300m west, and its platform arrangement was changed from double tracked side platforms to a single track terminus.

The station was converted into a double track island platform on 14 March 2010.

Keikyū introduced station numbering to its stations on 21 October 2010; Kojimashinden Station was assigned station number KK26.

== Passenger statistics ==
In fiscal 2019, the station was used by an average of 22,743 passengers daily.

The passenger figures for previous years are as shown below.

Fiscal year	daily average
2005	20,483
2010	20,890
2015	21,717

== Surrounding area ==
- Kawasaki City Tonomachi Elementary School
- AOI International Hospital
- Kawasaki Freight Station-Tokaido Freight Branch Line, Kanagawa Seaside Railway Mizue Line, Chidori Line, Ukishima Line
- Nippon Yakin Kogyo Kawasaki Factory (formerly YAKIN Kawasaki)

== See also ==
- List of railway stations in Japan
