= Keikyū Kawasaki Station =

Railway station in Kawasaki, Kanagawa Prefecture, Japan

KK20 Keikyū Kawasaki Station 京急川崎駅
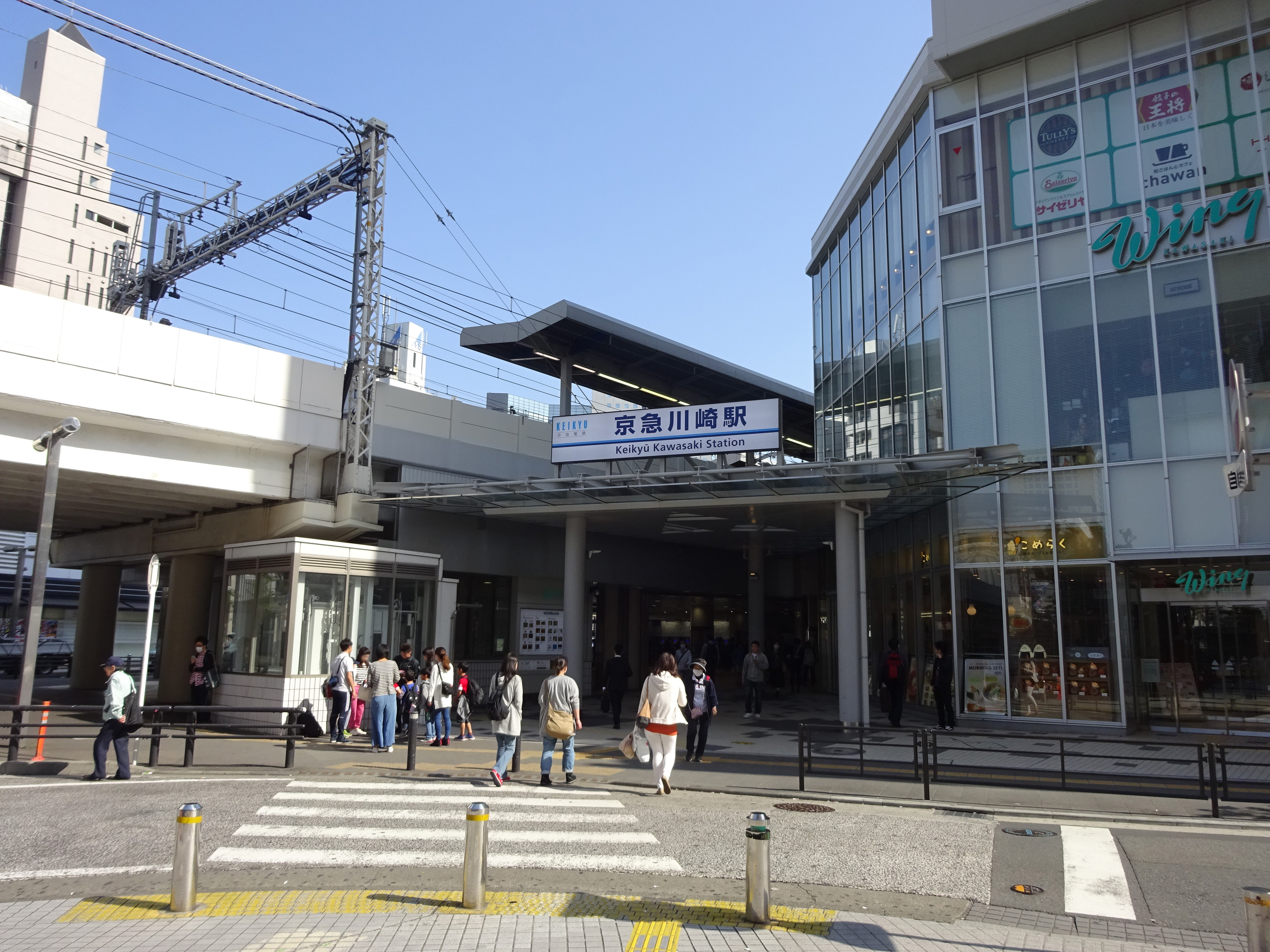
- The station entrance in April 2018

General information
- Location: 1 Isago, Kawasaki-ku, Kawasaki-shi, Kanagawa-ken 210-0006; Japan
- Coordinates: 35.5328287°N 139.7009039°E
- Operator: Keikyu Corporation
- Lines: Keikyū Main Line; Keikyū Daishi Line
- Distance: 11.8 km (7.3 mi) from Shinagawa
- Platforms: 7
- Tracks: 6
- Connections: JT04 JK16 JN01 Kawasaki; Bus stop

Other information
- Station code: KK20
- Website: Official website

History
- Opened: 1 September 1902; 123 years ago
- Former names: Kawasaki; Keihin Kawasaki (until 1987)

Passengers
- FY2019: 132,524 daily

Services
| Preceding station | Keikyu | Following station |
|---|---|---|
| Yokohama KK37 towards Misakiguchi | Evening Wing | Keikyū Kamata KK11 One-way operation |
| Yokohama KK37 towards Horinouchi | Main Line Limited Express (Kaitoku) | Keikyū Kamata KK11 towards Sengakuji |
| Kanagawa-shimmachi KK34 towards Uraga | Main Line Limited Express (Tokkyū) | Keikyū Kamata KK11 towards Sengakuji |
| Keikyū Tsurumi KK29 towards Kanazawa-hakkei | Main Line Express | Keikyū Kamata KK11 Terminus |
| Hatchō-nawate KK27 towards Uraga | Main Line Local | Rokugōdote KK19 towards Shinagawa |
| Terminus | Daishi Line | Minatochō KK21 towards Kojimashinden |
Location
- Location within Kanagawa Prefecture Location within Tokyo Bay and Bōsō Peninsula Location within Japan

Keikyū Kawasaki Station (京急川崎駅, Keikyū Kawasaki-eki) is a junction passenger railway station located in the city of Kawasaki, Kanagawa, Japan, operated by the private railway operator Keikyu Corporation. The station is one of two main rail transportation hubs in central Kawasaki (the other being JR East's Kawasaki Station, which is a short walking distance away).

== Lines ==
Keikyū Kawasaki Station is served by the Keikyu Main Line, and lies 13.0 kilometres (8.1 mi) from the official starting point of the line at Sengakuji in Tokyo. The station is also a terminus for the 4.5 km Keikyu Daishi Line to Kojimashinden.

== Station layout ==
Keikyū Kawasaki Station has two elevated island platforms serving four tracks for the Keikyū Main Line, connected to the three ground-level bay platforms serving the Keikyu Daishi Line and station building by an underpass.

=== Platforms ===
| 1 | ■ Keikyu Daishi Line | for Kawasaki-Daishi and Kojimashinden (extra platform) |
| 2 | ■ Keikyu Daishi Line | (alighting only) |
| 3 | ■ Keikyu Daishi Line | for Kawasaki-Daishi and Kojimashinden |
| 4,5 | ■ Keikyu Main Line | for Yokohama, Kamiōoka, and Uraga (Through service to Kurihama Line at Horinouchi) Miurakaigan (Through service to Zushi Line at Kanazawa-hakkei) Zushi·Hayama |
| 6,7 | ■ Keikyu Main Line | for Shinagawa, (Through service to Keikyu Airport Line) Haneda Airport; Toei Asakusa Line for Nihombashi and Asakusa; Keisei Main Line for Narita Airport |

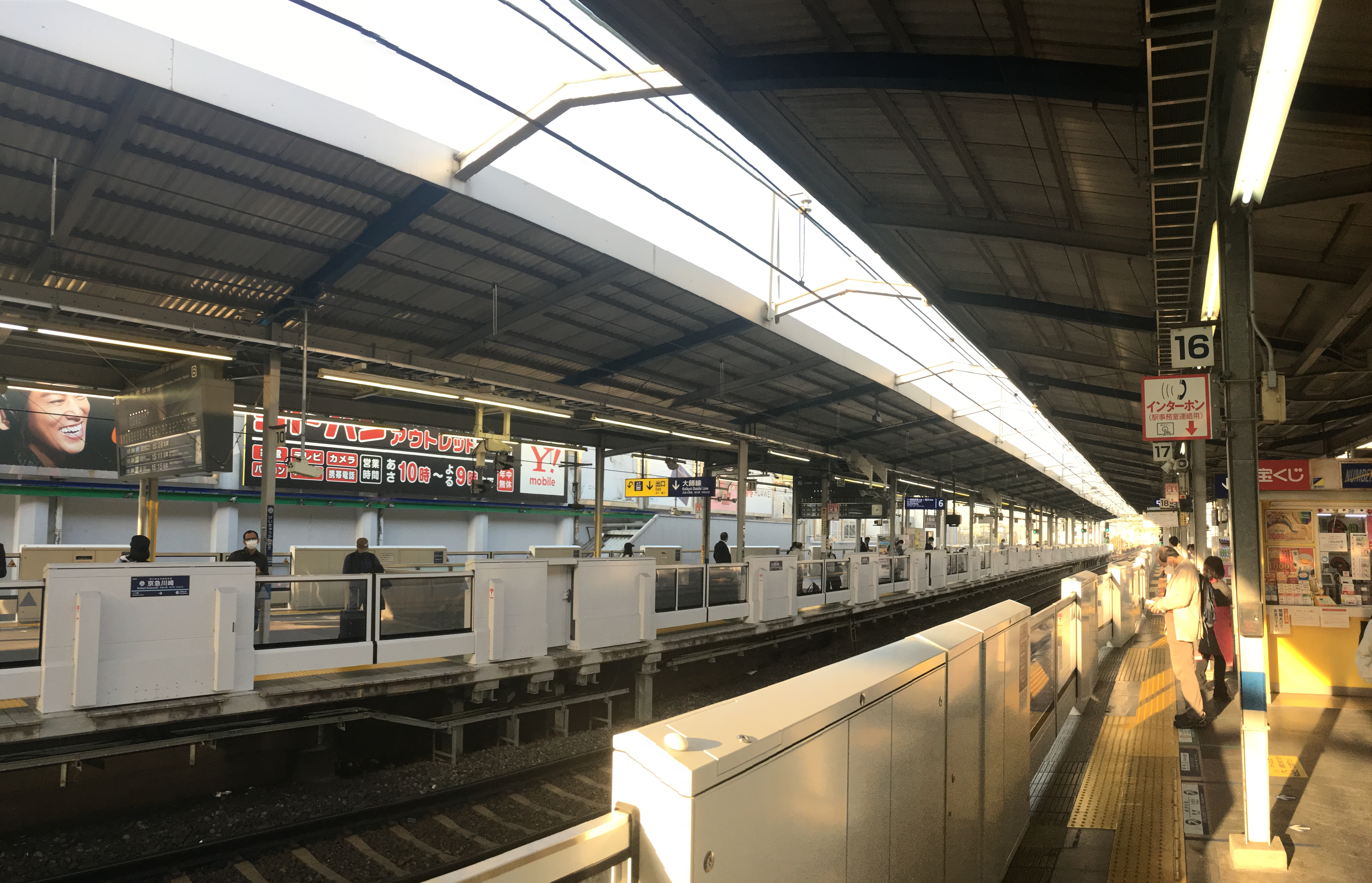
The elevated Keikyu Main Line platforms in November 2020

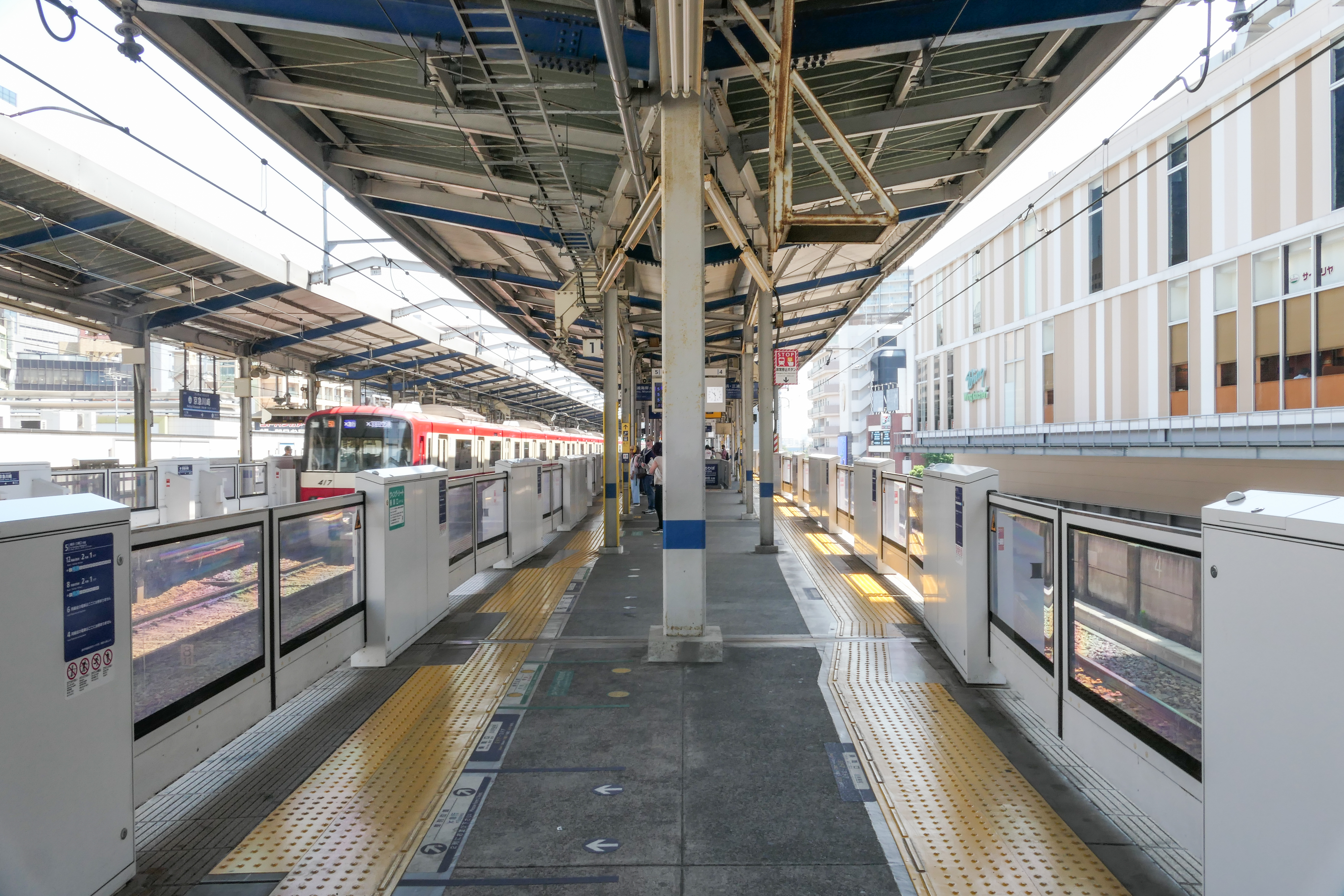
Platform 4 and 5 at Keikyu Kawasaki Station (Keikyu Main Line platform) in July 2023

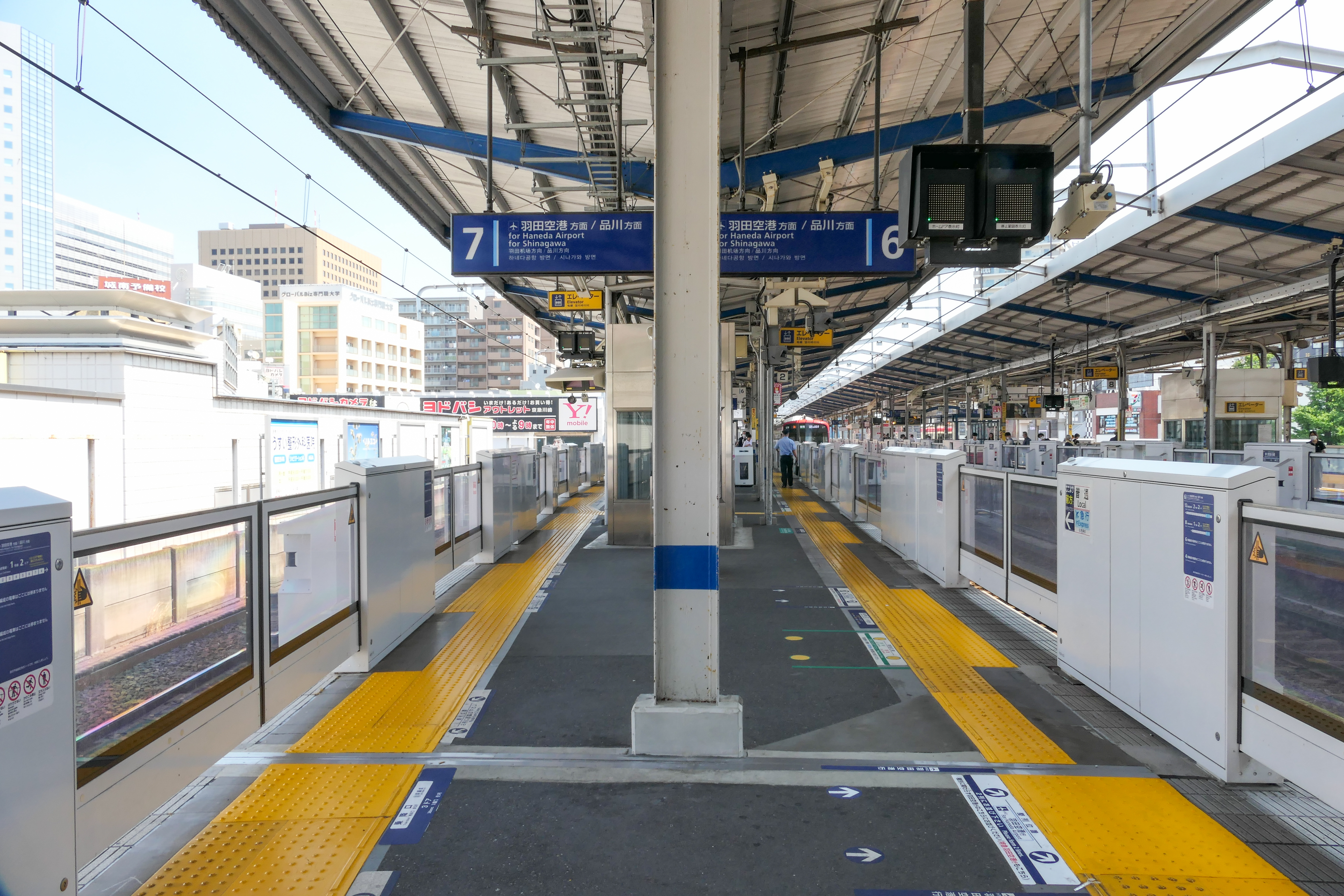
Platform 6 and 7 at Keikyu Kawasaki Station (Keikyu Main Line platform) in July 2023

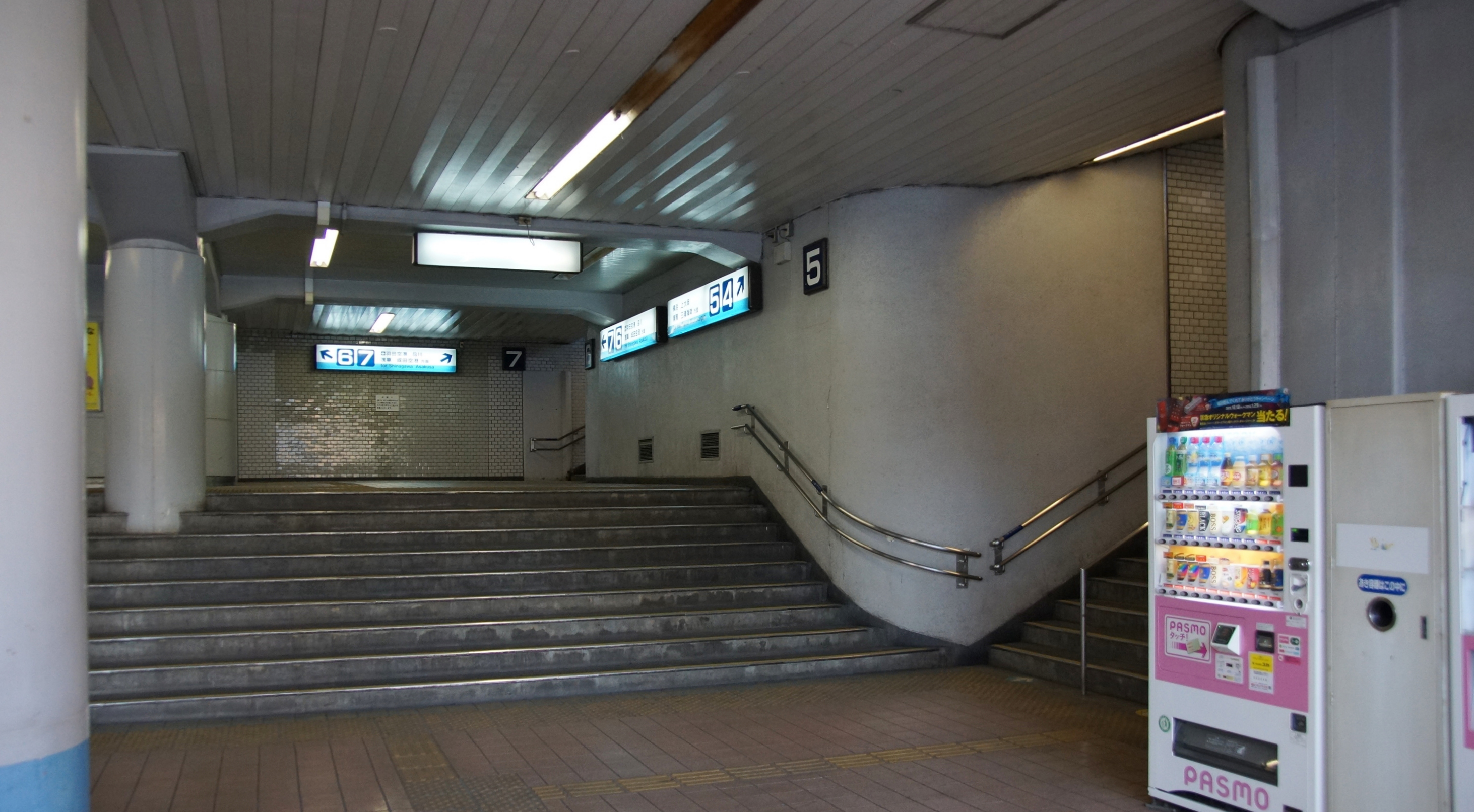
The stairs leading from the ground-level Daishi Line platforms to the elevated Keikyu Main Line platforms (4 to 7) in January 2016

== History ==
The station opened on September 1, 1902 as Kawasaki Station (川崎駅) as a station on the privately owned Keihin Electric Railway. It was renamed Keihin Kawasaki Station (京浜川崎駅) on November 1, 1925 to avoid confusion with the nearby JGR Kawasaki Station. The tracks were elevated in May 1966. The station was renamed Keikyū Kawasaki on 1 June 1987.

Keikyū introduced station numbering to its stations on 21 October 2010; Keikyū Kawasaki Station was assigned station number KK20.

== Passenger statistics ==
In fiscal 2019, the station was used by an average of 132,524 passengers daily.

The passenger figures for previous years are as shown below.

| Fiscal year | daily average |
|---|---|
| 2005 | 108,019 |
| 2010 | 115,036 |
| 2015 | 122,931 |

== Surrounding area ==
The station is also surrounded by many shopping complexes, restaurants, and a Toho movie theater. JR Kawasaki Station is located to the southwest of the station.

== See also ==
- List of railway stations in Japan
