= Keikyu =

Japanese railway company

Keikyu Corporation

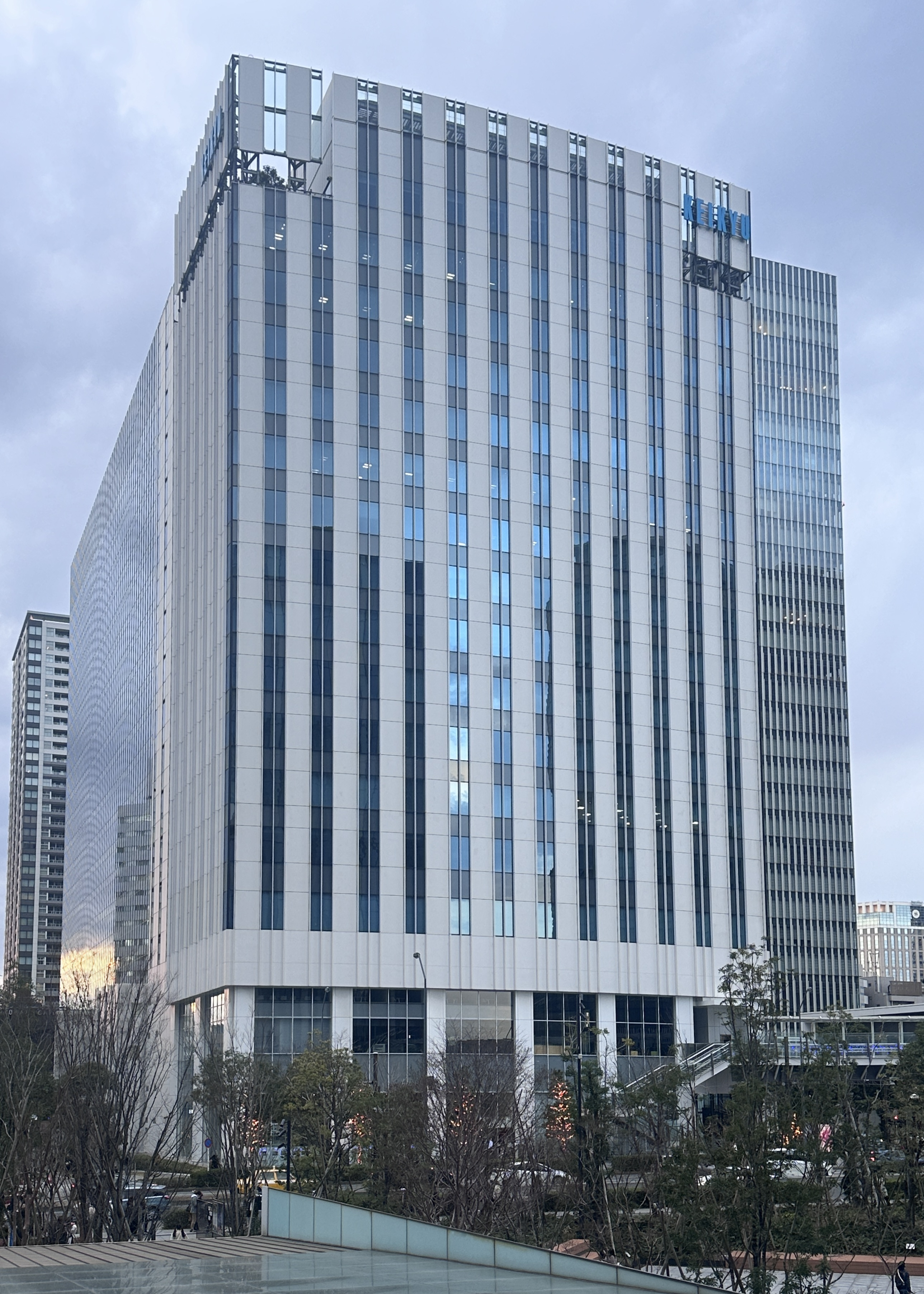
- Headquarters in Yokohama
- Native name: 京浜急行電鉄株式会社
- Formerly: Keihin Electric Express Railway Company, Ltd. (1948-2010)
- Company type: Public
- Traded as: TYO: 9006
- Industry: Public transport Real estate Retail
- Predecessor: "Old" Keihin Electric Railway; Tokyu Corporation
- Headquarters: Yokohama, Japan
- Key people: Kazuyuki Harada (Chairman); Yukihiro Kawamata (President)
- Subsidiaries: Keihin Kyuko Bus etc
- Website: keikyu.co.jp

Keikyu Corporation (京浜急行電鉄株式会社, Keihin Kyūkō Dentetsu Kabushiki-gaisha) (TYO: 9006), also known as Keihin Kyūkō (京浜急行) or, more recently, Keikyū (京急), is a private railroad that connects inner Tokyo to Kawasaki, Yokohama, Yokosuka and other points on the Miura Peninsula in Kanagawa Prefecture. It also provides rail access to Haneda Airport in Tokyo. Keihin (京浜) means the Tokyo (東京) - Yokohama (横浜) area. The company's railroad origins date back to 1898, but the current company dates to 1948. The railway pioneered Kantō region's first electric train and the nation's third, after Hanshin Electric Railway and Nagoya Electric Railway (Meitetsu) with the opening of a short 2 km (1.2 mi) long section of what later became the Daishi Line in January 1899.

Keikyu's formal logo, adopted in 1964, rarely used in publicity since 1983; today it is mostly found in Keikyu maintenance worker headgear. It is a stylized version of the katakana ヶ

It is a member of the Fuyo Group and has its headquarters in Yokohama. The company changed its English name from Keihin Electric Express Railway Co., Ltd. to Keikyu Corporation on 21 October 2010.

Trains on the Main Line have a maximum operating speed of 120 km/h (75 mph), making it the third fastest private railroad in the Tokyo region after the Keisei Skyliner and the Tsukuba Express. The track gauge is 1,435 mm (4 ft 8 1/2 in) (Standard gauge), differing from the more common Japanese track gauge of 1,067 mm (3 ft 6 in).

== Lines ==
Linemap of Keikyu Corporation

Line	Termini	Length	Stations
Main	Sengakuji–Uraga	56.7 km (35.2 mi)	50
Kurihama	Horinouchi–Misakiguchi	13.4 km (8.3 mi)	9
Zushi	Kanazawa-Hakkei–Zushi-Hayama	5.9 km (3.7 mi)	4
Daishi	Keikyū Kawasaki–Kojimashinden	4.5 km (2.8 mi)	7
Airport	Keikyū Kamata–Haneda Airport Terminal 1·2	6.5 km (4.0 mi)	7
Total		87.0 km (54.1 mi)	73

The Keikyu Main Line runs between south area of Tokyo, Kawasaki, Yokohama, and Yokosuka. Shinagawa Station is the terminal station in Tokyo of this line. Its Kaitoku (快特) limited-stop service competes with JR East's Tōkaidō Main Line and Yokosuka Line.

From Sengakuji station, Keikyu trains run into the Toei Asakusa Line and Keisei Electric Railway (to Narita Airport) and Hokuso Railway (to Chiba newtown area) lines.

== Stations ==
There are a total of 73 “unique” stations (i.e., counting stations served by multiple lines only once) on the Keikyu network, or 77 total stations if each station on each line counts as one station.

== Rolling stock ==
=== Active ===
Keikyu currently has 802 vehicles available for passenger revenue service.

- 600 series (introduced 1994)
- N1000 series (introduced 2002)
- 1500 series (introduced 1985)
- 2100 series (introduced 1998)
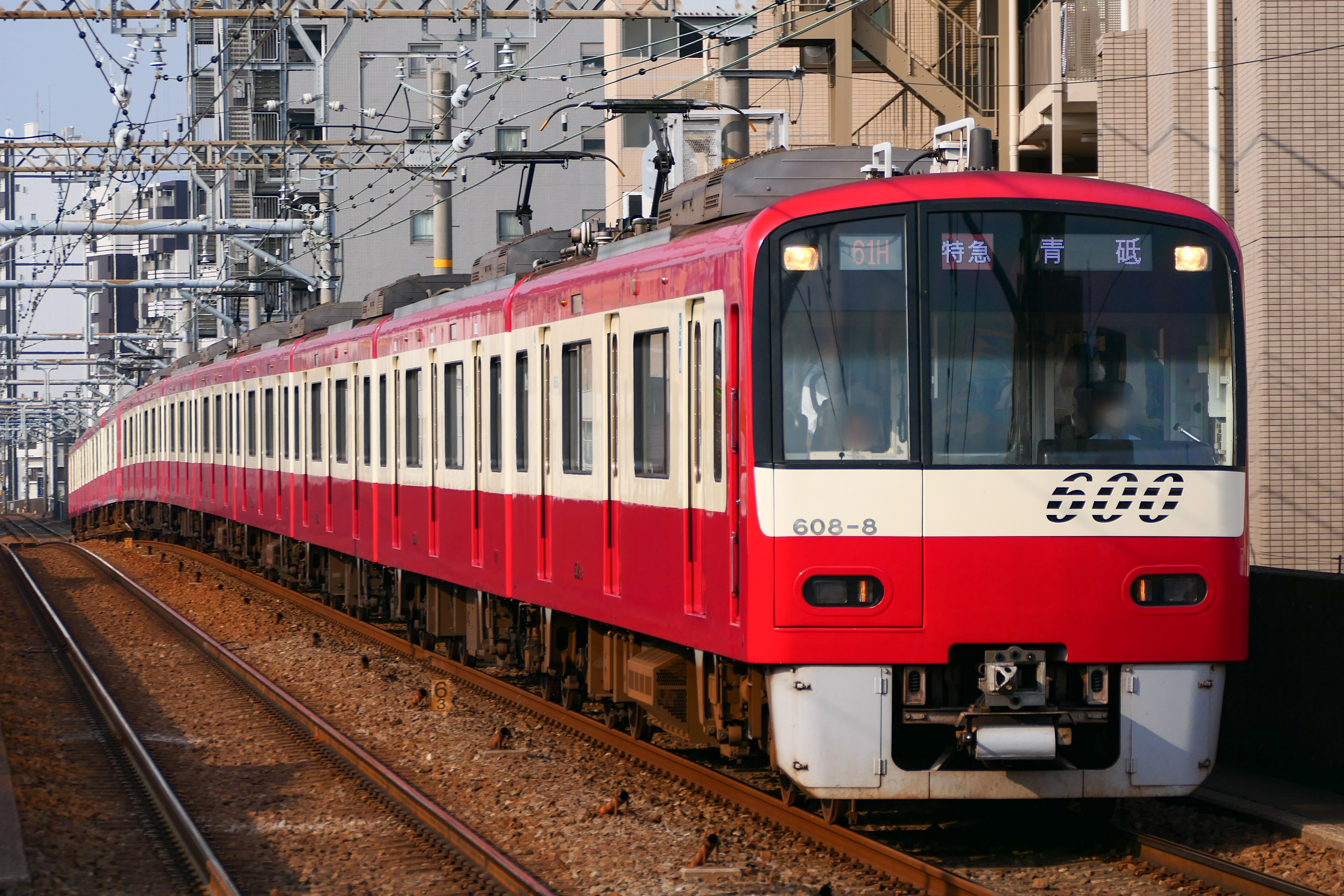
600 series

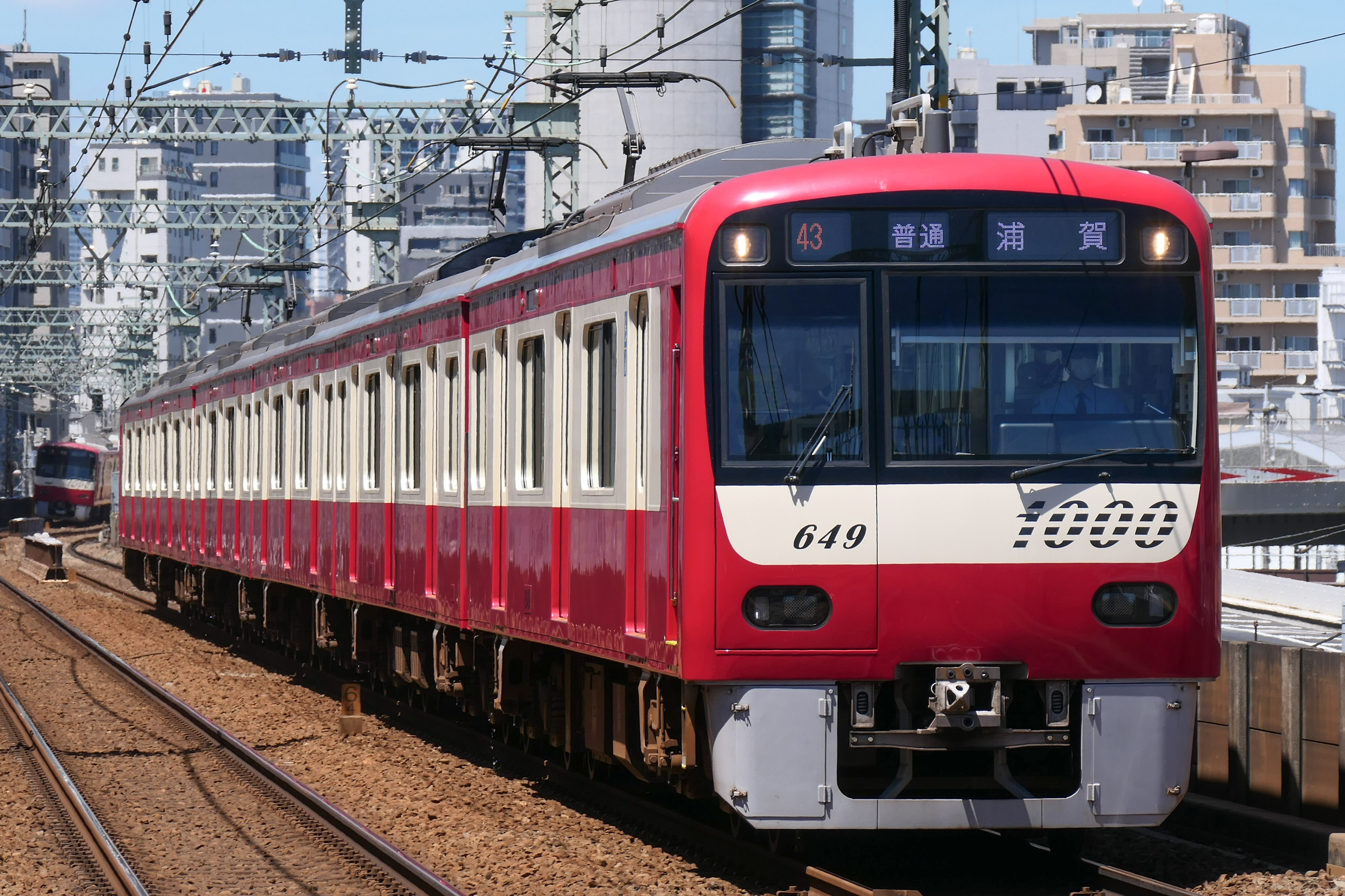
N1000 series

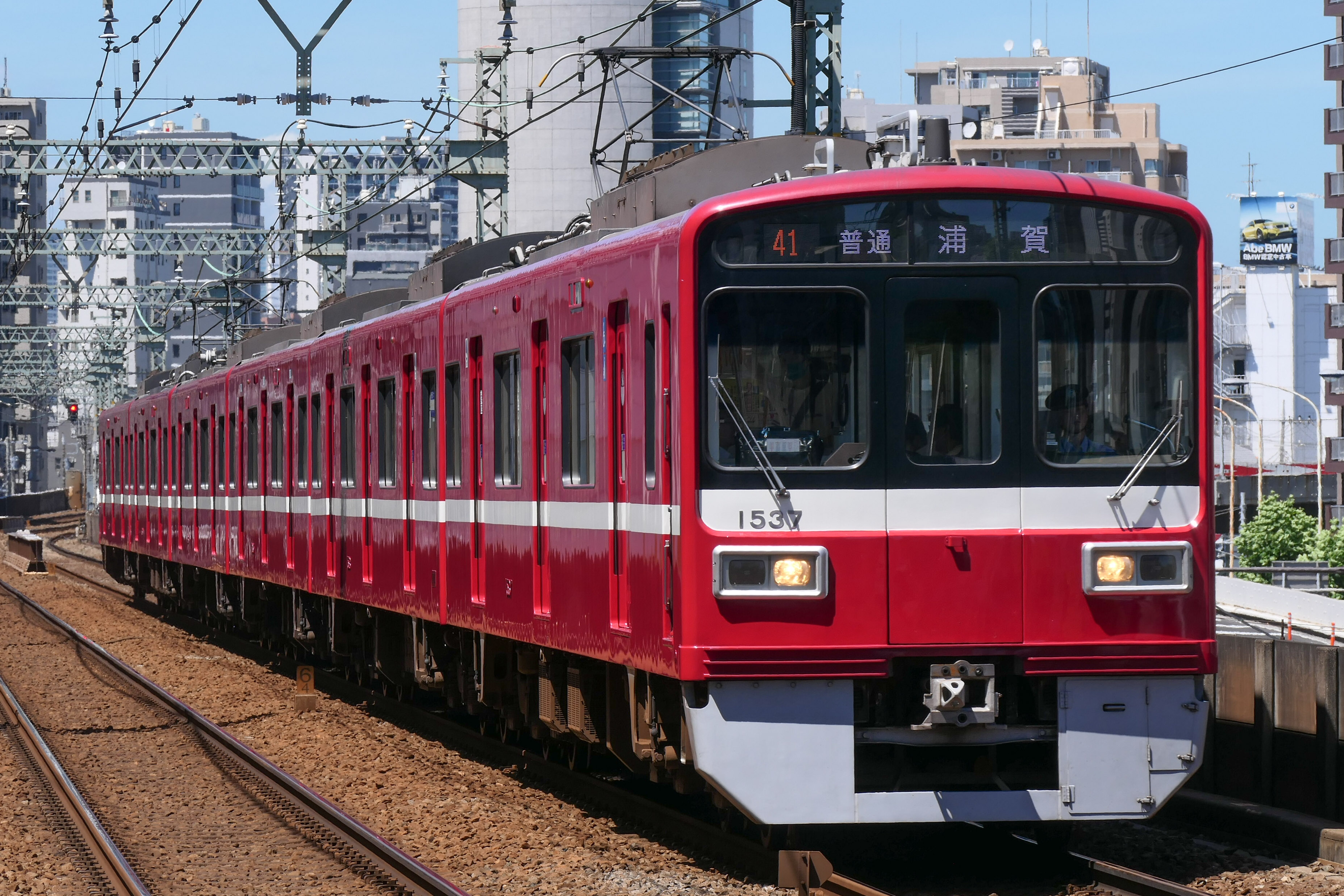
1500 series

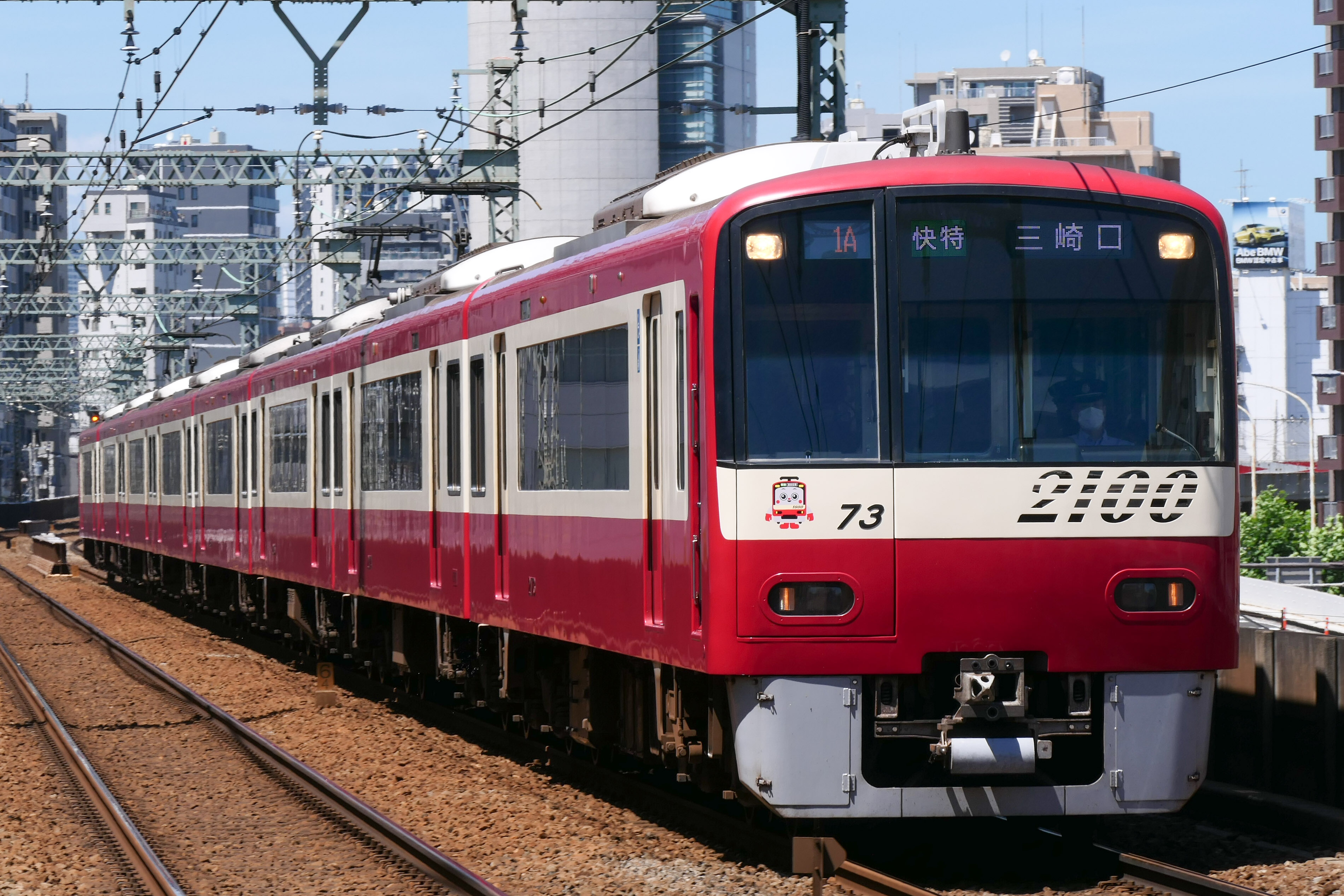
2100 series

=== Retired ===
- 230 series (introduced 1930)
- 400 series (introduced 1965)
- 500 series (introduced 1951)
- 600 series (1956–1986, classified as 700 series from 1956 to 1966)
- 700 series (1967–2005)
- 800 series (1978–2019)
- 1000 series (1958–2010, classified as 800 series from 1958 to 1966)
- 2000 series (1982–2018)
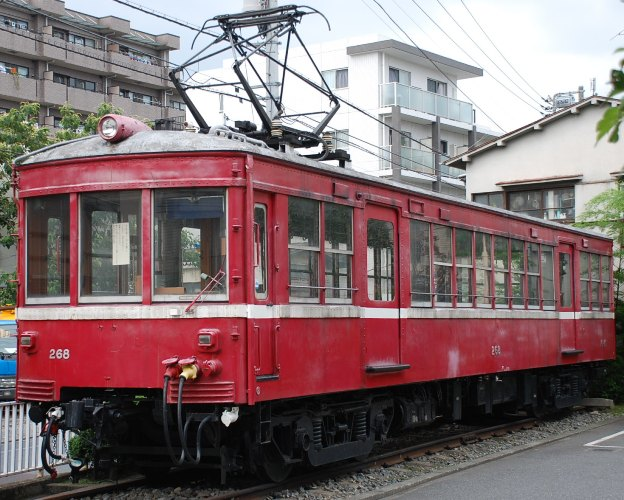
230 series

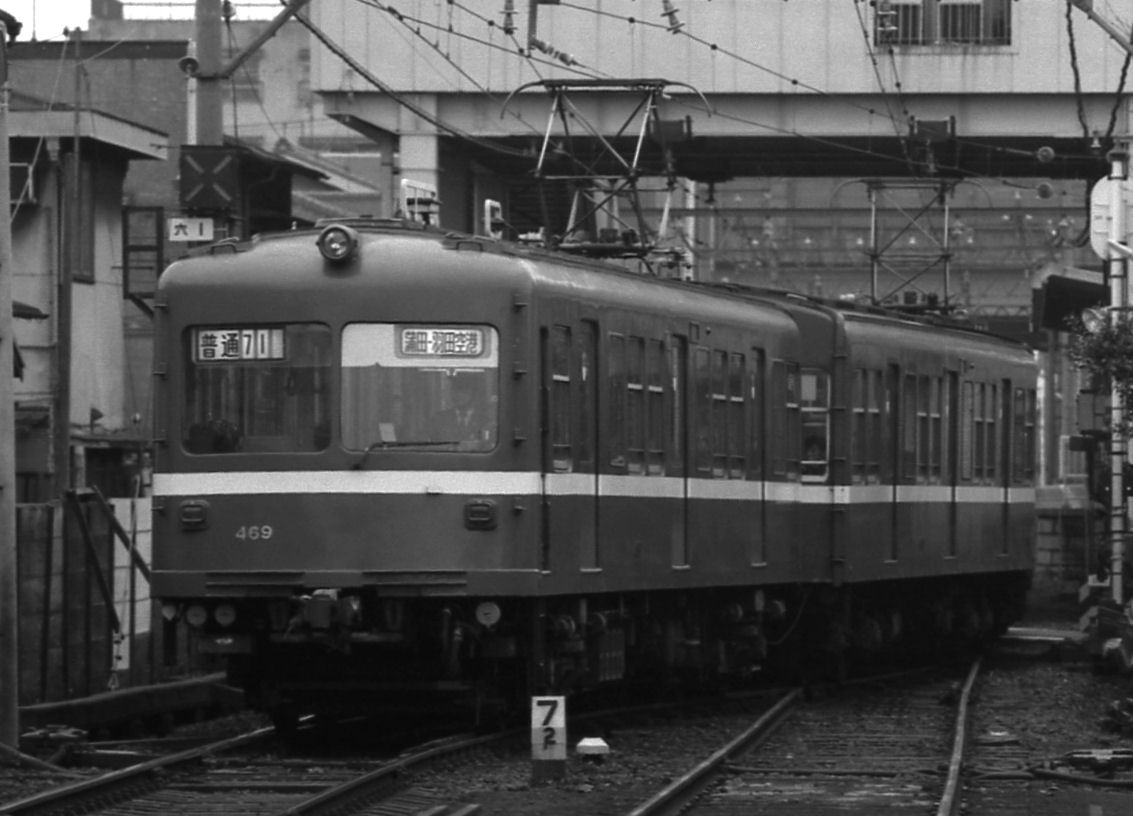
400 series

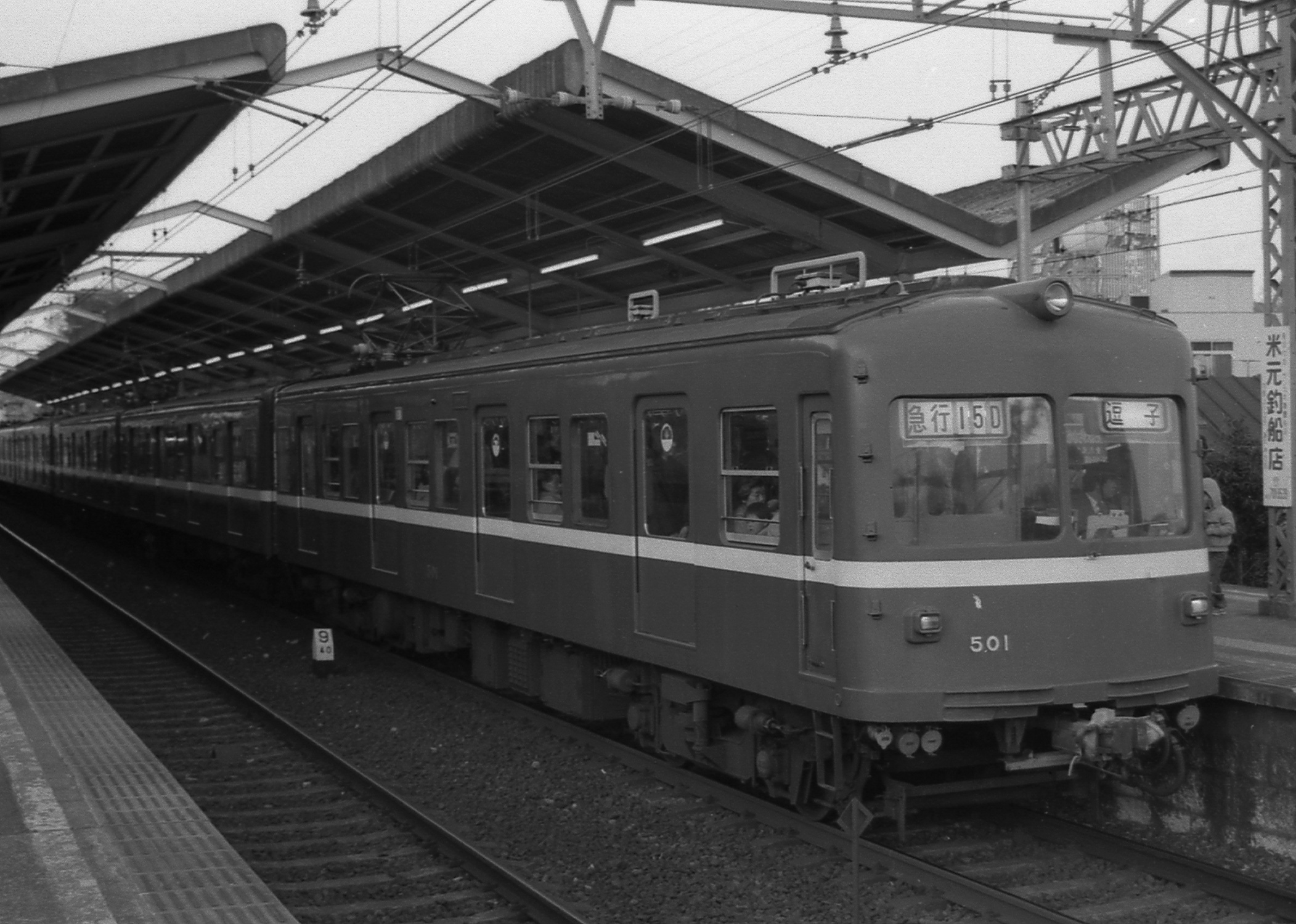
500 series

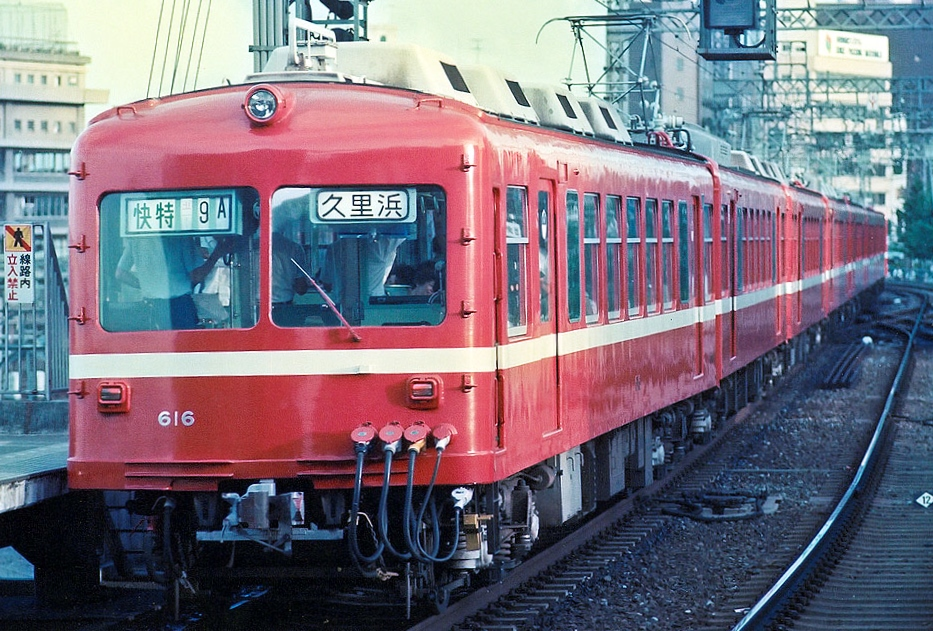
600 series

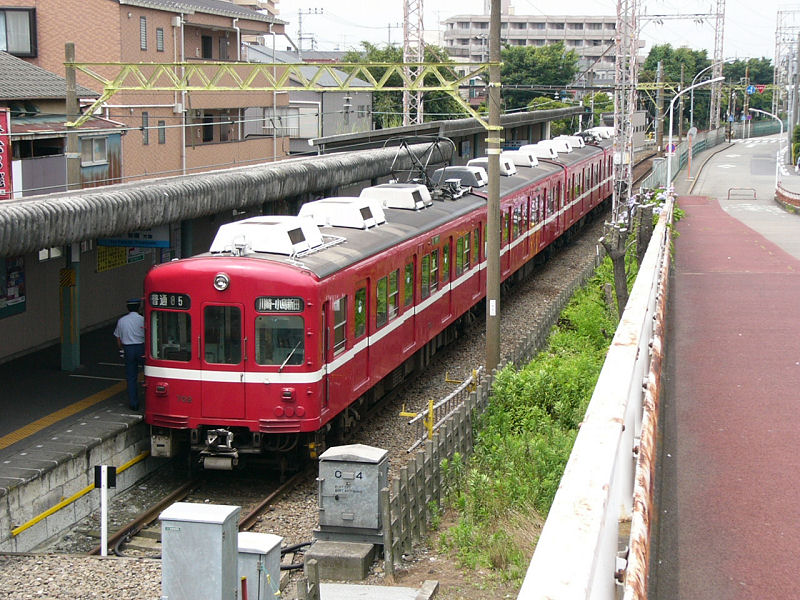
700 series

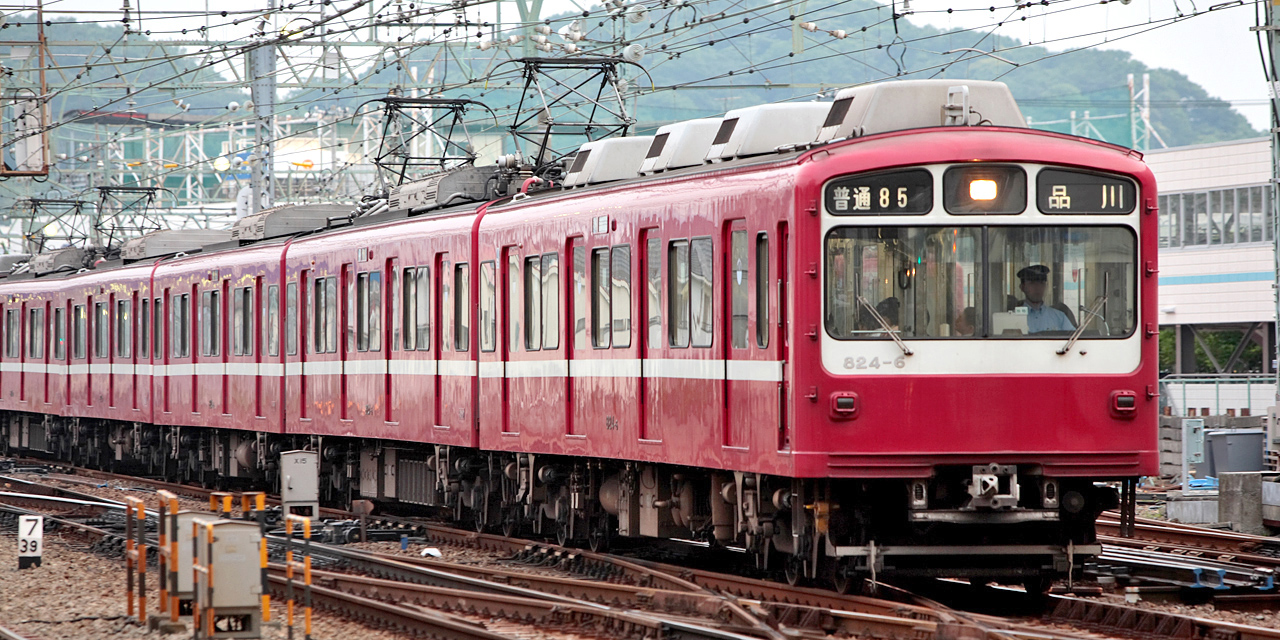
800 series

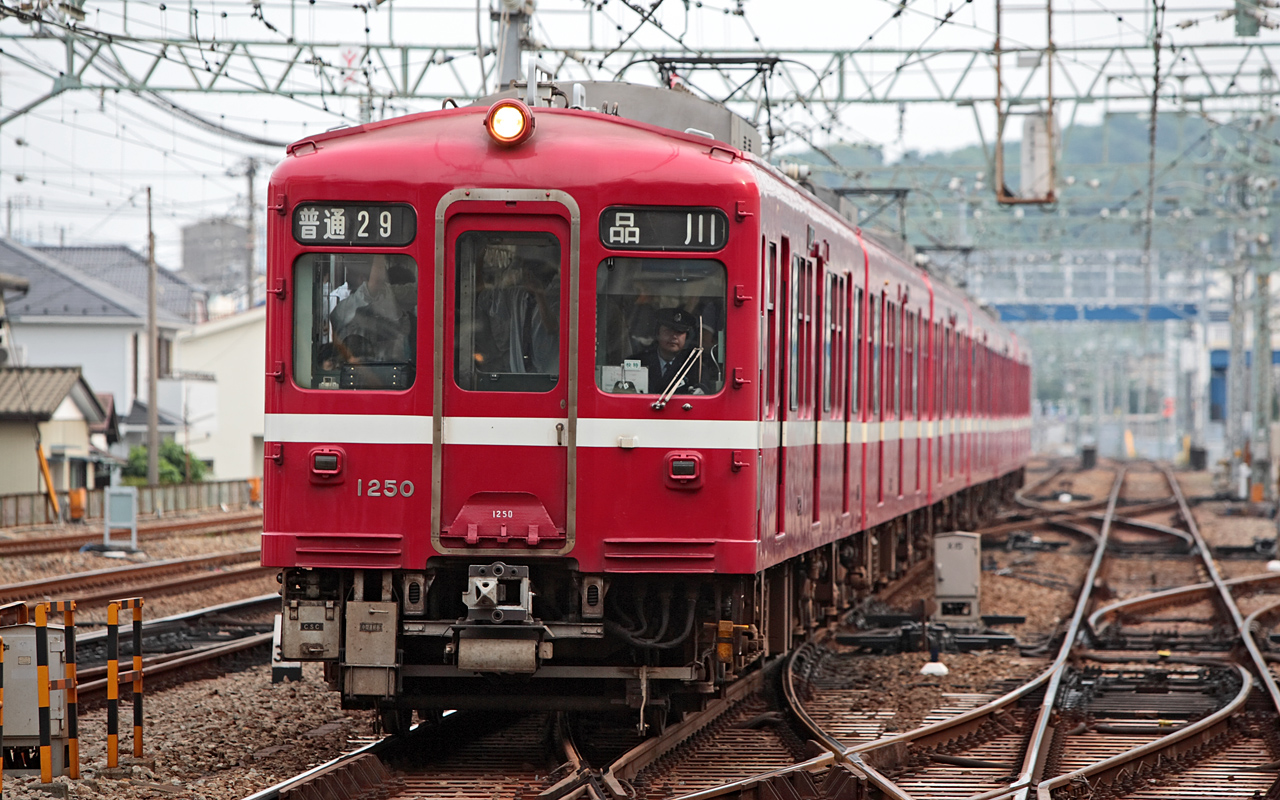
1000 series

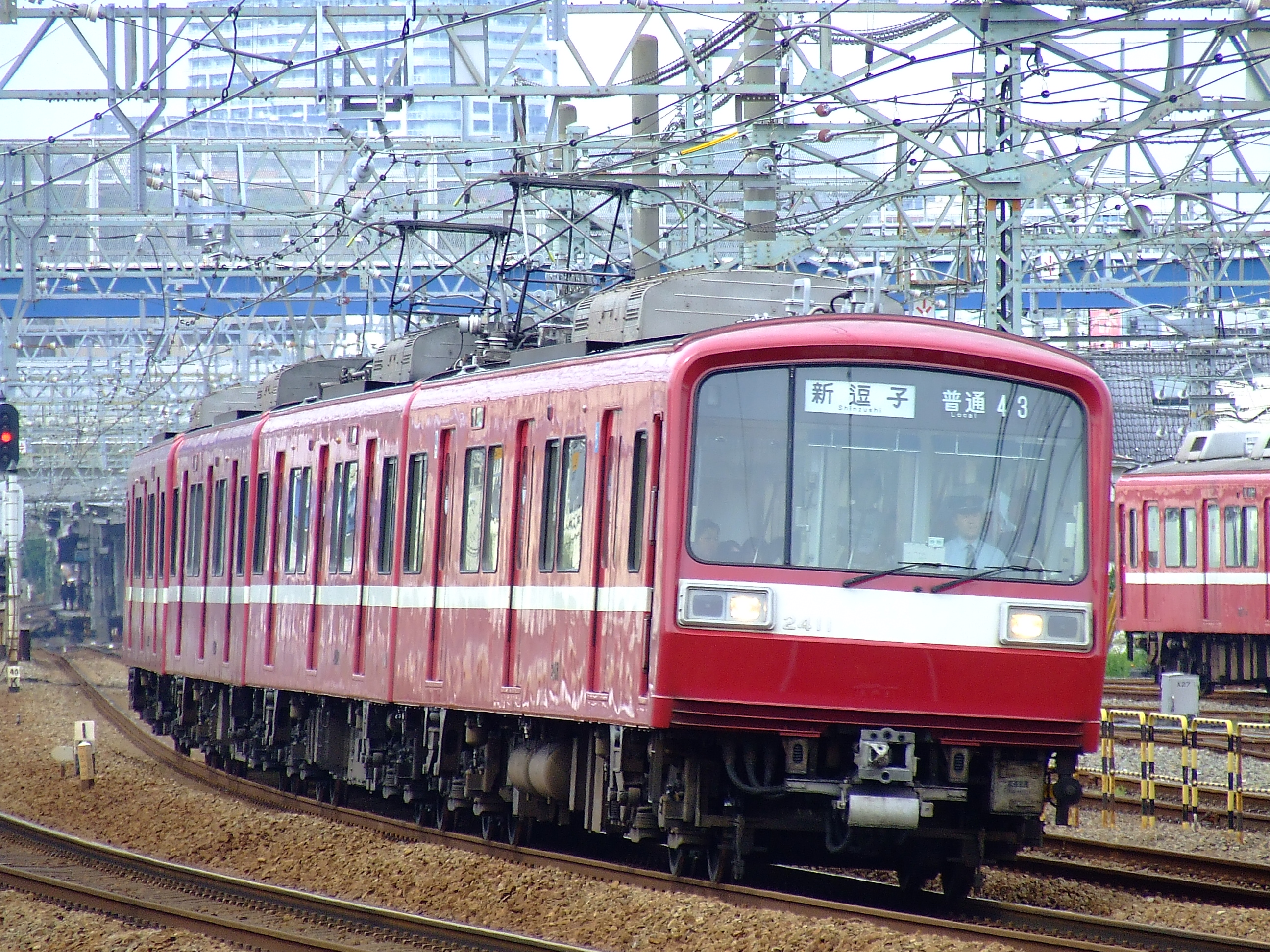
2000 series

== Accidents ==
Since 1997, Keikyu has had five accidents, all of which were on the main line, in the vicinity of Yokosuka and Yokohama.

On 7 April 1997, at about 2:47 pm, the first three cars of a four-car train derailed after colliding with a mudslide, resulting in 22 people injured. The accident occurred between Keikyu-Taura(In Japanese:京急田浦) and Anjinzuka (In Japanese:安針塚 or 按針塚) stations, with approximately 60 people on board. Heavy rains caused the mudslide, 7 months after a report by the train company to the Transportation Minister that there was little probability of such an occurrence in that area. 500 workers were mobilized as the train service was temporarily suspended between Kanazawa-Hakkei and Horinouchi Stations.

On 24 November 2000, at about 5:20 am, the front car of a four-car train derailed after a truck collided with the first car of the train at a railroad crossing, resulting in 3 passengers being slightly injured. The accident occurred in Yokosuka and the approximately 100 commuters on board later walked about 200 m to the nearest station to continue their commute via bus. The driver of the truck reported his foot became stuck between the accelerator and brake pedals, sending him through the crossing bar and into the crossing. Normal operations continued about 4 hours later that morning.

On 24 September 2012, at about 11:58 pm, the first three cars of an eight-car train derailed after colliding with a mudslide, resulting in injuries to 28 people including the train driver. 7 men and women were seriously injured, including fractures, broken ribs and pelvises. The accident occurred between Oppama and Keikyu Taura stations, between Yokohama and Yokosuka, with approximately 700 passengers on board. Heavy rains caused the mudslide, sweeping away safety nets that had been installed in 1998, the year after a similar mudslide in the area. An area of soil about 12 meters high and 15 meters wide fell onto the tracks, bringing trees and fencing structures with it. The train was travelling 75 km/h before the driver applied the brakes, 30 to 40 meters before the mudslide. Train services were temporarily suspended between Kanazawa-Hakkei and Hemi stations and temporary bus services were provided by the train company until normal operations resumed approximately 55 1/2 hours later after the assessment and clean-up process.

On 18 April 2013, at about 4:30 pm, two window panes shattered in the front car of a local commuter train while passing an express train going the opposite direction, resulting in minor cuts to two high school students sitting with their backs to the windows. One window pane was also cracked on the passing train with no injuries. The accident occurred between Taura and Anjinzuka stations, with approximately 30 people in that car at the time of the accident.

On 5 September 2019 a limited express train crashed into a truck in nearby Kanagawa-Shinmachi Station. There were 33 injuries and 1 death (truck driver).
