= Keikyū Nagasawa Station =

Railway station in Yokosuka, Kanagawa Prefecture, Japan

KK69 Keikyū Nagasawa Station 京急長沢駅
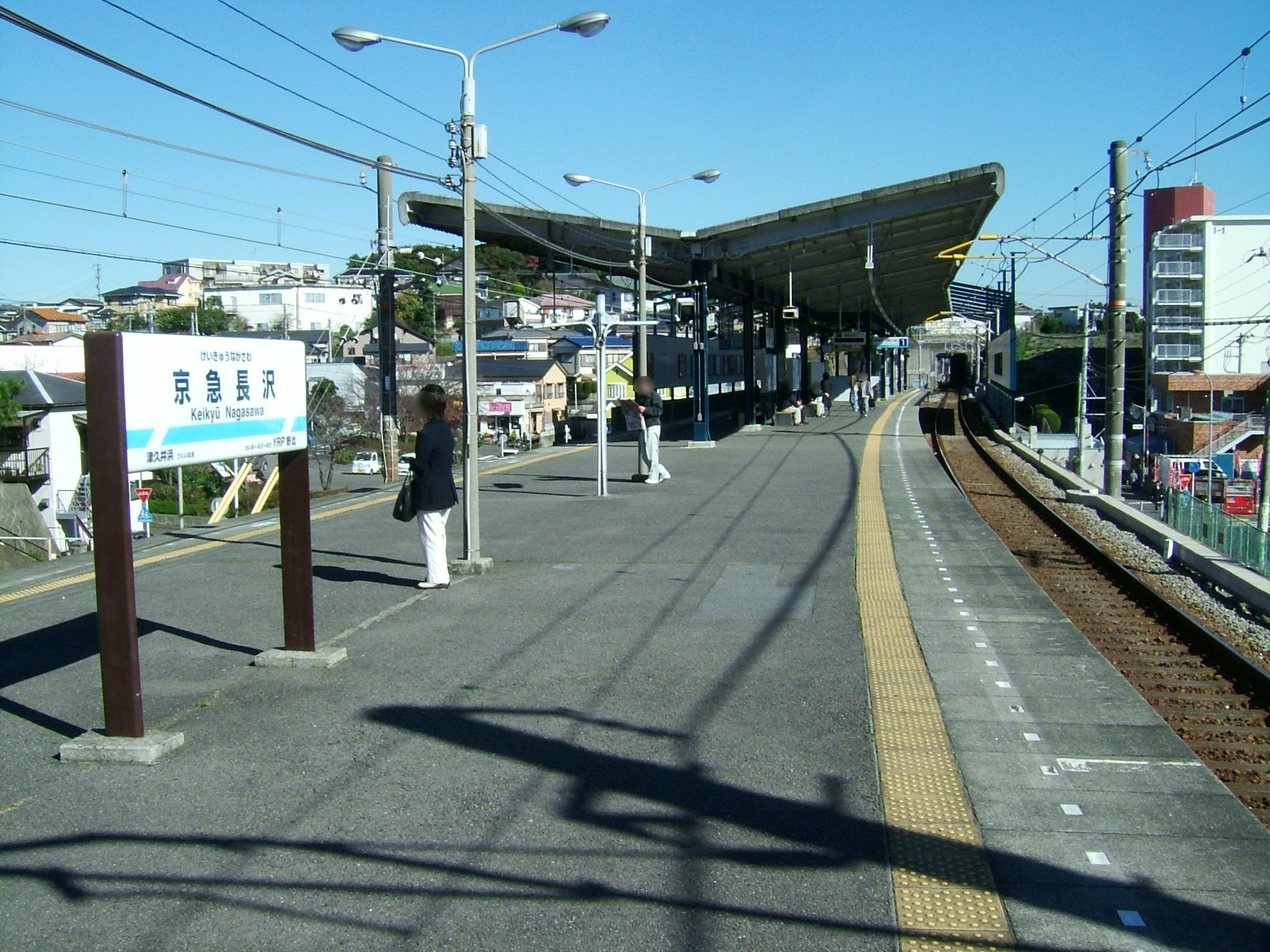
- Keikyū Nagasawa Station

General information
- Location: Nagasawa 1-35-1, Yokosuka-shi, Kanagawa-ken 239-0842; Japan
- Coordinates: 35.2053°N 139.6739°E
- Operator: Keikyū
- Line: Keikyū Kurihama Line
- Distance: 60.8 km from Shinagawa
- Platforms: 1 island platform
- Connections: Bus stop

Construction
- Accessible: Yes

Other information
- Station code: KK69
- Website: Official website (in Japanese)

History
- Opened: March 27, 1966
- Former names: Keihin Nagasawa (until 1987)

Passengers
- FY2019: 7,232 daily

Services
Preceding station	Keikyu	Following station
Tsukuihama KK70 towards Misakiguchi	Evening Wing	YRP Nobi One-way operation
Tsukuihama KK70 towards Misakiguchi	Kurihama Line Limited Express (Kaitoku) Limited Express (Tokkyū)	YRP Nobi KK68 towards Horinouchi
Location
- Location within Kanagawa Prefecture Location within Japan

Keikyū Nagasawa Station (京急長沢駅, Keikyū Nagasawa-eki) is a passenger railway station located in the city of Yokosuka, Kanagawa Prefecture, Japan, operated by the private railway company Keikyū.

== Lines ==
Keikyū Nagasawa Station is served by the Keikyū Kurihama Line and is located 8.5 rail kilometers from the junction at Horinouchi Station, and 60.8 km from the starting point of the Keikyū Main Line at Shinagawa Station in Tokyo.

=== Platforms ===
1	■ Keikyū Kurihama Line	for Miurakaigan and Misakiguchi
2	■ Keikyū Kurihama Line	for Keikyū Kurihama and Horinouchi; Keikyū Main Line for Yokohama, Shinagawa, and Sengakuji; Keikyū Airport Line for Haneda Airport Terminal 1·2; Toei Asakusa Line for Shimbashi and Oshiage; Keisei Oshiage Line for Aoto; Keisei Main Line for Keisei Funabashi and Narita Airport; Hokuso Line for Shin-Kamagaya and Inba-Nihon-Idai; Narita Sky Access Line for Narita Airport

== History ==
Keikyū Nagasawa Station opened on March 27, 1966, as Keihin Nagasawa Station (京浜長沢駅, Keihin Nagasawa-eki). It changed to its present name on June 1, 1987.

Keikyū introduced station numbering to its stations on 21 October 2010; Keikyū Nagasawa Station was assigned station number KK69.

== Passenger statistics ==
In fiscal 2019, the station was used by an average of 7,232 passengers daily.

The passenger figures for previous years are as shown below.

Fiscal year	daily average
2005	8,052
2010	7,678
2015	7,331

== Surrounding area ==
- Nagasawa Sunlive Shopping Street
- Yokosuka City Hall Kitashitaura Administration Center
- Yokosuka City Kitashitaura Elementary School
- Yokosuka City Kitashitaura Junior High School

== See also ==
- List of railway stations in Japan
