= Tsukuihama Station =

Railway station in Yokosuka, Kanagawa Prefecture, Japan

KK70 Tsukuihama Station 津久井浜駅
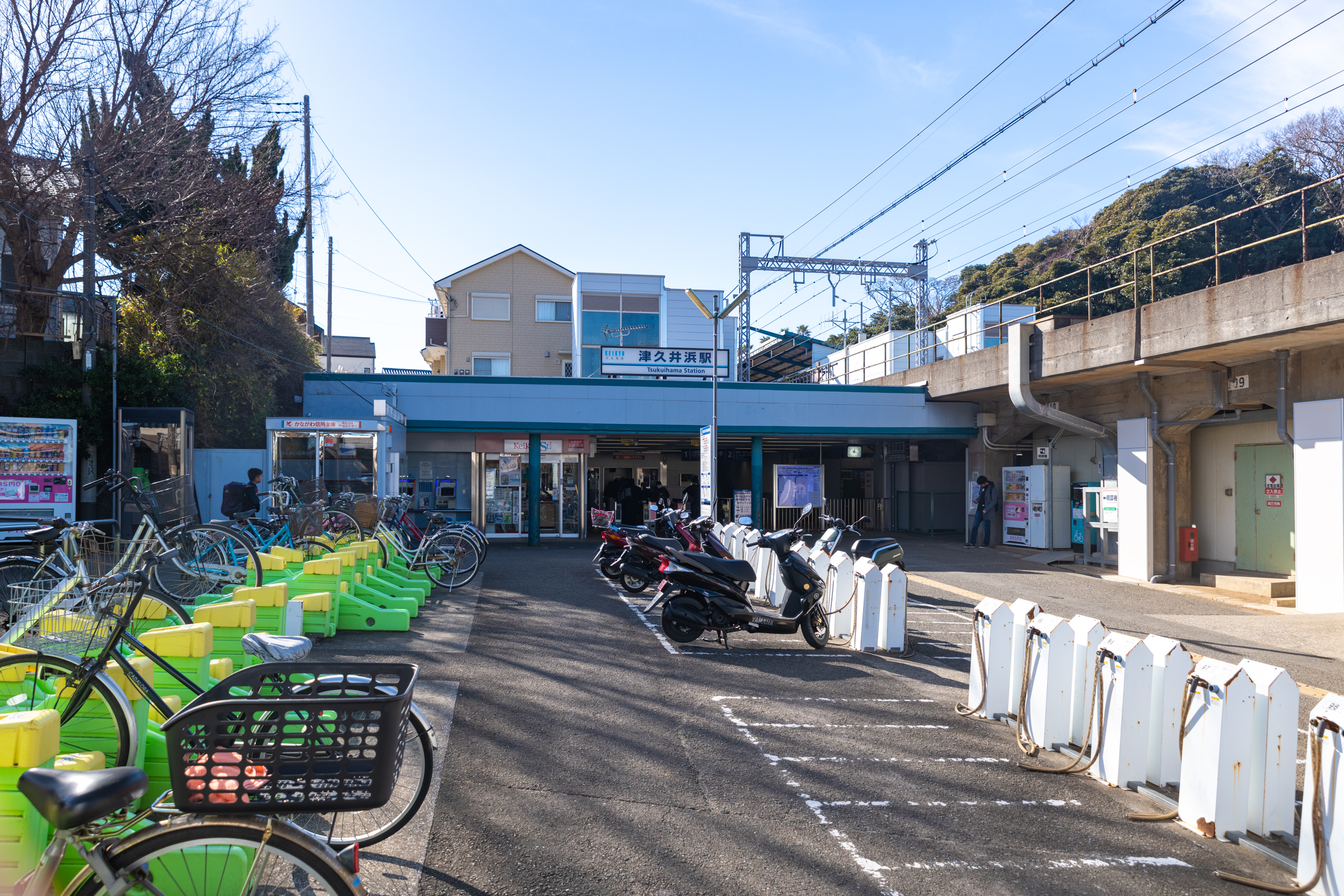
- Tsukuihama Station

General information
- Location: 4-2-1 Tsukui, Yokosuka-shi, Kanagawa-ken 239-0843; Japan
- Coordinates: 35.1982°N 139.6652°E
- Operator: Keikyū
- Line: Keikyū Kurihama Line
- Distance: 62.0 km from Shinagawa
- Platforms: 2 side platforms
- Connections: Bus stop

Construction
- Accessible: Yes

Other information
- Station code: KK70
- Website: Official website (in Japanese)

History
- Opened: March 27, 1966

Passengers
- FY2019: 6,299 daily

Services
Preceding station	Keikyu	Following station
Miurakaigan KK71 towards Misakiguchi	Evening Wing	Keikyū Nagasawa One-way operation
Miurakaigan KK71 towards Misakiguchi	Kurihama Line Limited Express (Kaitoku) Limited Express (Tokkyū)	Keikyū Nagasawa KK69 towards Horinouchi
Location
- Location within Kanagawa Prefecture Location within Japan

Tsukuihama Station (津久井浜駅, Tsukuihama-eki) is a passenger railway station located in the city of Yokosuka, Kanagawa Prefecture, Japan, operated by the private railway company Keikyū.

== Lines ==
Tsukuihama Station is served by the Keikyū Kurihama Line and is located 9.7 rail kilometers from the junction at Horinouchi Station, and 62.0 km from the starting point of the Keikyū Main Line at Shinagawa Station in Tokyo.

== Station layout ==
The station consists of two opposed elevated side platforms serving two tracks, with the station building underneath.

=== Platforms ===
1	■ Keikyū Kurihama Line	for Miurakaigan and Misakiguchi
2	■ Keikyū Kurihama Line	for Keikyū Kurihama and Horinouchi; Keikyū Main Line for Yokohama, Shinagawa, and Sengakuji; Keikyū Airport Line for Haneda Airport; Toei Asakusa Line for Shimbashi and Oshiage; Keisei Oshiage Line for Aoto; Keisei Main Line for Keisei Funabashi and Narita Airport; Hokuso Line for Shin-Kamagaya and Inba-Nihon-Idai; Narita Sky Access Line for Narita Airport

== History ==
Tsukuihama Station opened on March 27, 1966, as the southern terminus of the Kurihama Line, until superseded by Miurakaigan Station on July 7 of the same year.

Keikyū introduced station numbering to its stations on October 21, 2010; Tsukuihama Station was assigned station number KK70.

== Passenger statistics ==
In fiscal 2019, the station was used by an average of 6,299 passengers daily.

The passenger figures for previous years are as shown below.

Fiscal year	daily average
2005	6,380
2010	6,483
2015	6,497

== Surrounding area ==
- Kanagawa Prefectural Tsukuihama High School
- Yokosuka City Tsukui Kindergarten
- Yokosuka Tsukui Post Office
- Tsukui Beach

== See also ==
- List of railway stations in Japan
