= Kanazawa-bunko Station =

Railway station in Yokohama, Japan

KK49 Kanazawa-bunko Station 金沢文庫駅
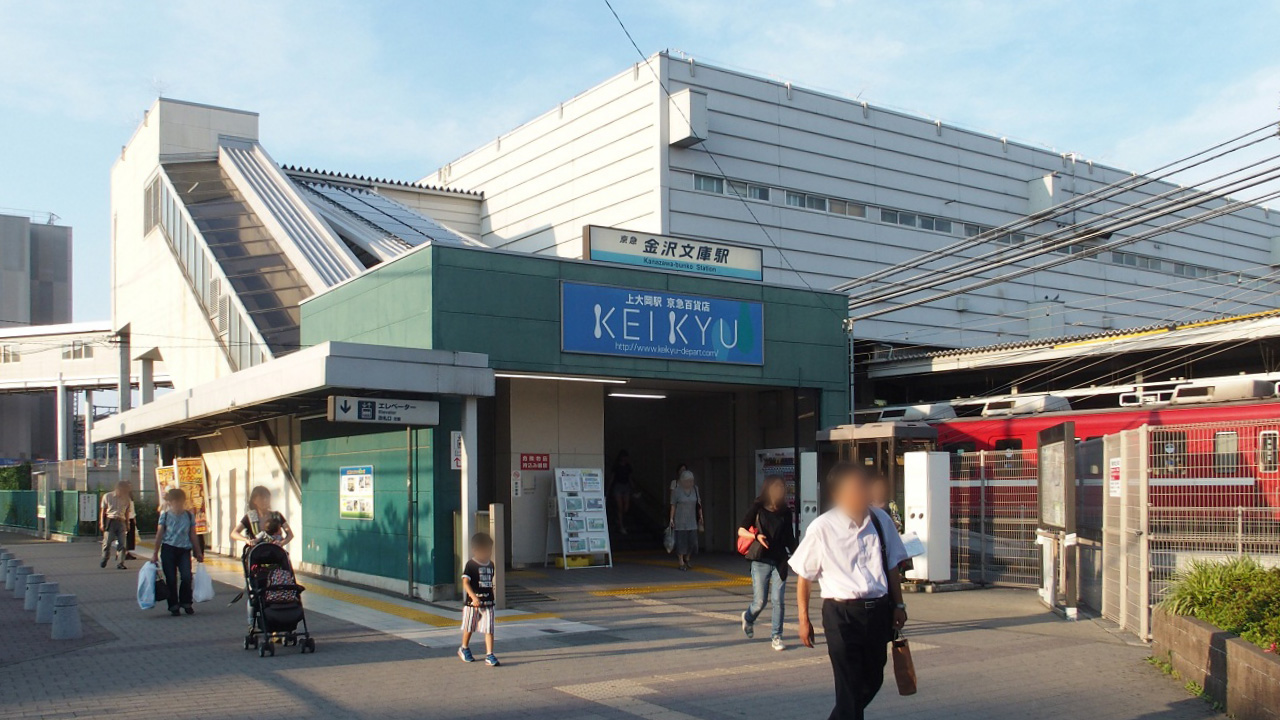
- Kanazawa-bunko Station west entrance in June 2016

General information
- Location: 384 Yatsumachi, Kanazawa-ku, Yokohama-shi, Kanagawa-ken 236-0016; Japan
- Coordinates: 35.342837°N 139.621639°E
- Operator: Keikyū
- Line: Keikyu Main Line
- Distance: 39.5 km from Shinagawa
- Platforms: 2 island platforms
- Tracks: 4
- Connections: Bus stop

Other information
- Station code: KK49
- Website: Official website

History
- Opened: 1 April 1930

Passengers
- FY2019: 69,940 daily

Services
Preceding station	Keikyu	Following station
Yokosuka-chūō One-way operation	Morning Wing	Kamiōoka KK44 towards Sengakuji
Kanazawa-hakkei KK50 towards Misakiguchi	Evening Wing	Kamiōoka One-way operation
Kanazawa-hakkei KK50 towards Horinouchi	Main Line Limited Express (Kaitoku)	Kamiōoka KK44 towards Sengakuji
Kanazawa-hakkei KK50 towards Uraga	Main Line Limited Express (Tokkyū)	Kamiōoka KK44 towards Sengakuji
Kanazawa-hakkei KK50 Terminus	Main Line Express	Nōkendai KK48 towards Keikyū Kamata
Kanazawa-hakkei KK50 towards Uraga	Main Line Local	Nōkendai KK48 towards Shinagawa
Location
- Location within Kanagawa Prefecture Location within Japan

Kanazawa-bunko Station (金沢文庫駅, Kanazawa-bunko-eki) is a passenger railway station located in Kanazawa-ku, Yokohama, Kanagawa Prefecture, Japan, operated by the private railway company Keikyū.

== Lines ==
Kanazawa-bunko Station is served by the Keikyū Main Line and is located 39.5 kilometers from the terminus of the line at Shinagawa Station in Tokyo.

== Station layout ==
The station consists of two island platforms serving four tracks. The outside tracks 1 and 4 are used for local service; inside tracks 2 and 3 are used for express services.

=== Platforms ===
1/2	■ Keikyu Main Line	for Yokosuka-chūō, Zushi·Hayama, Misakiguchi, and Uraga
3/4	■ Keikyu Main Line	for Haneda Airport, Shinagawa, and Oshiage

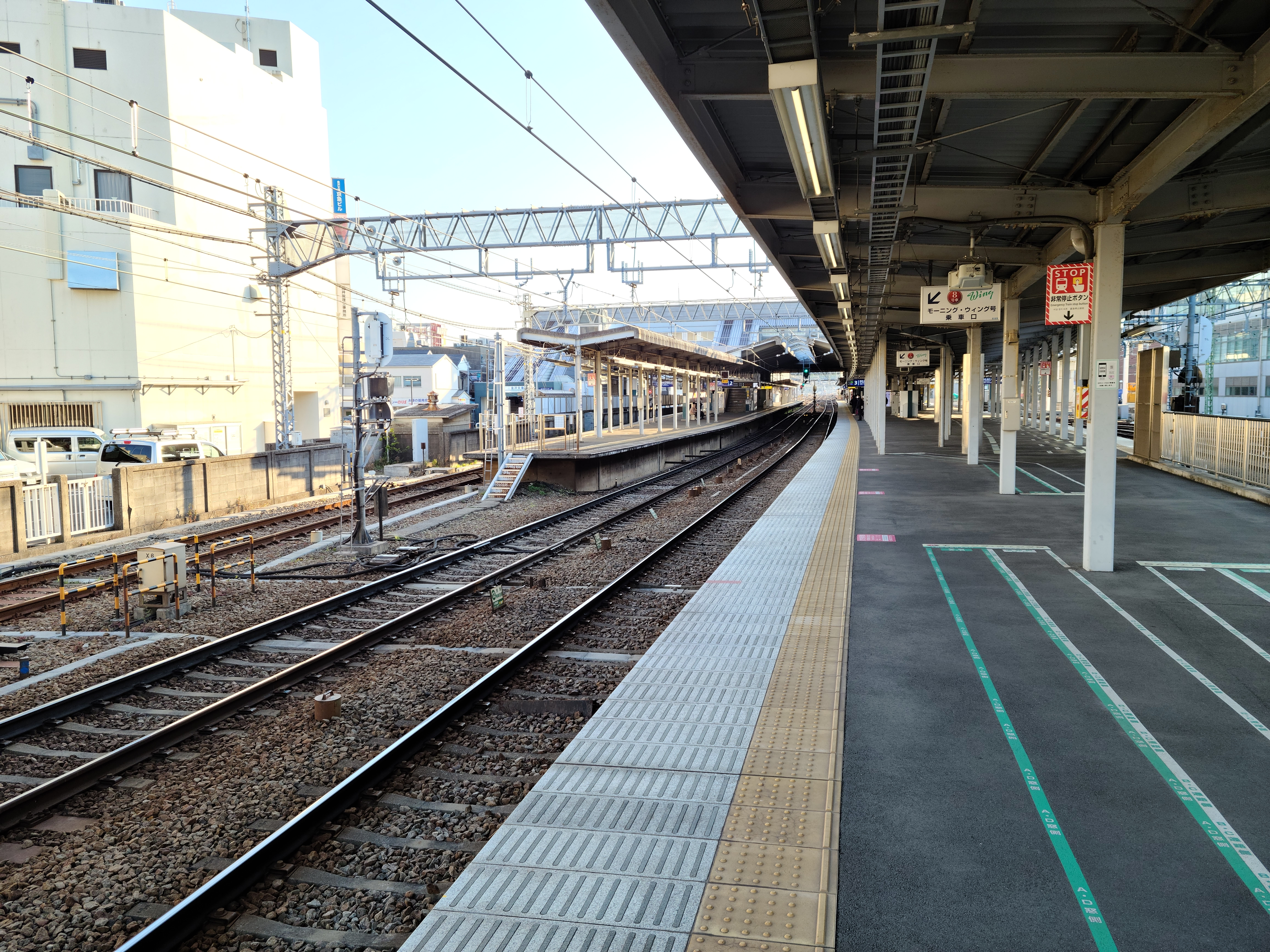
The platforms in January 2021

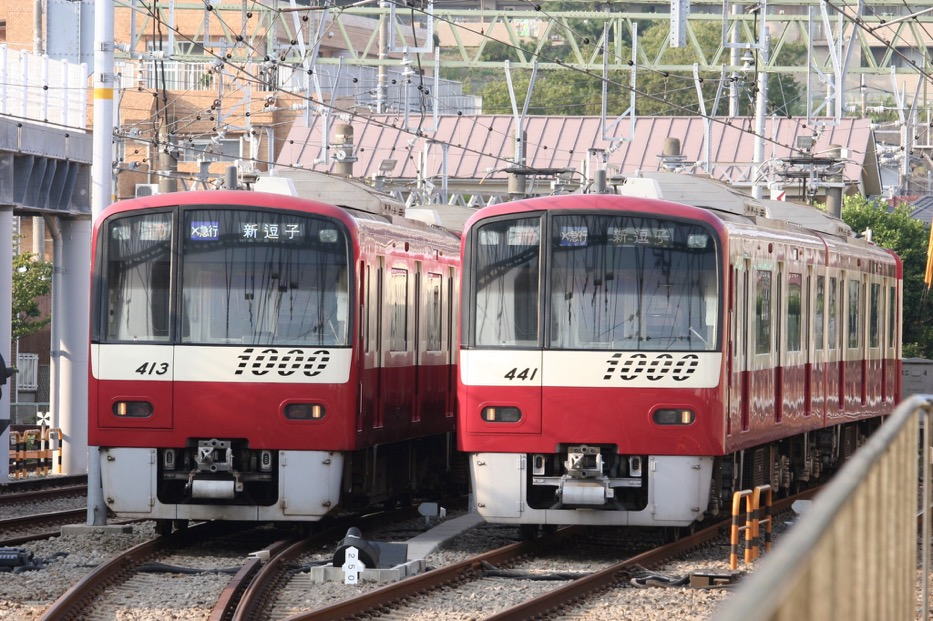
A pair of 4-car trains on standby for addition to 8-car northbound services

=== Operations ===
Kanazawa-Bunko is a major station for railway operations. To increase capacity during peak hours, most Limited Express and Morning/Evening Wing services operate in a 12-car formation. In order to achieve this operation, a handful of 4-car trains are placed on standby on sidings around the station and are added to select 8-car Limited Express and Morning Wing trains to form a 12-car train bound for Shinagawa, at which the added sets are then removed. The reverse happens during the evening peak hour as the 4-car sets are removed from 12-car trains while the 8-car trains continue south on through services to the Keikyū Kurihama Line and points further south.

== History ==
Kanazawa-bunko Station opened on April 1, 1930.

Keikyū introduced station numbering to its stations on 21 October 2010; Kanazawa-Bunko Station was assigned station number KK49.

== Passenger statistics ==
In fiscal 2019, the station was used by an average of 69,940 passengers daily.

The passenger figures for previous years are as shown below.

Fiscal year	daily average
2005	73,650
2010	72,532
2015	69,870

== Surrounding area ==
- Kanazawa Bunko, a museum and library established in 1275

== Bus services ==
Bus services from the north exit are operated by Yokohama City Bus, Daishinto Bus, and Yokohama Keikyu Bus.

== See also ==
- List of railway stations in Japan
