= Kitakurihama Station =

Railway station in Yokosuka, Kanagawa Prefecture, Japan

KK66 Kitakurihama Station 北久里浜駅
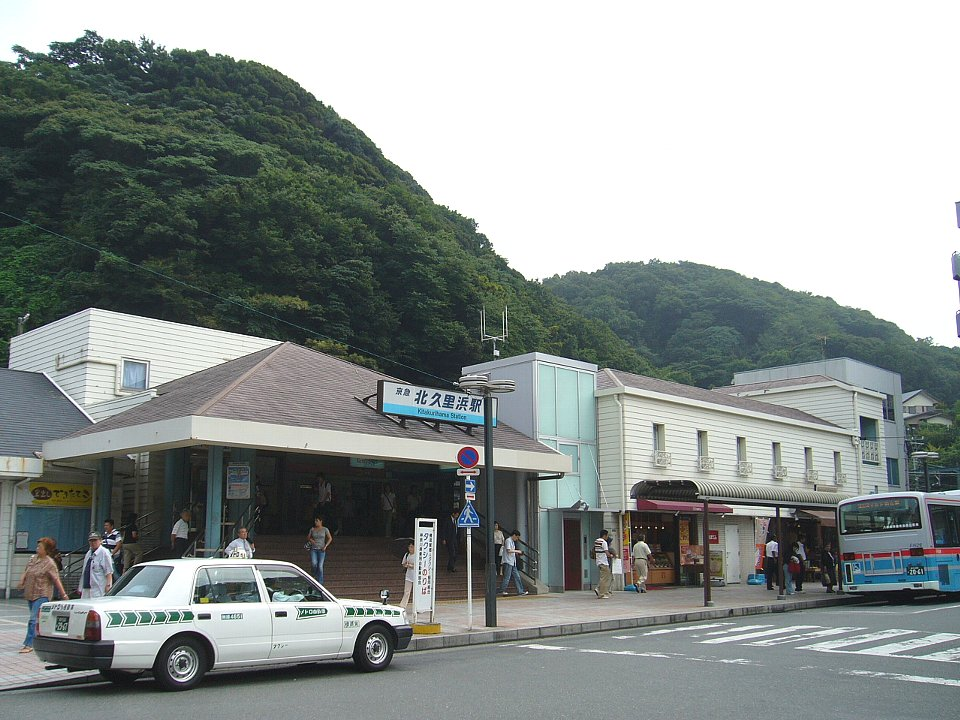
- Kitakurihama Station

General information
- Location: Negishi 2-206, Yokosuka-shi, Kanagawa-ken 239-0807; Japan
- Coordinates: 35°14′58″N 139°41′11″E
- Operator: Keikyū
- Line: Keikyū Kurihama Line
- Distance: 54.0 km from Shinagawa
- Platforms: 2 side platforms
- Connections: Bus stop

Construction
- Accessible: Yes

Other information
- Station code: KK66
- Website: Official website (in Japanese)

History
- Opened: December 1, 1942
- Former names: Shōnan (to 1948); Shōnan-ida (until 1963)

Passengers
- FY2019: 25,627 daily

Services
Preceding station	Keikyu	Following station
Keikyū Kurihama KK67 towards Misakiguchi	Evening Wing	Shin-ōtsu One-way operation
Keikyū Kurihama KK67 towards Misakiguchi	Kurihama Line Limited Express (Kaitoku) Limited Express (Tokkyū)	Shin-ōtsu KK65 towards Horinouchi
Keikyū Kurihama KK67 Terminus	Kurihama Line Local	Shin-ōtsu KK65 towards Horinouchi
Location
- Location within Kanagawa Prefecture Location within Japan

Kitakurihama Station (北久里浜駅, Kitakurihama-eki) is a passenger railway station located in the city of Yokosuka, Kanagawa Prefecture, Japan, operated by the private railway company Keikyū.

== Lines ==
Kitakurihama Station is served by the Keikyū Kurihama Line and is located 1.7 rail kilometers from the junction at Horinouchi Station, and 54.0 km from the starting point of the Keikyū Main Line at Shinagawa Station in Tokyo.

== Station layout ==
The station consists of two opposed side platforms connected to the station building by a footbridge.

=== Platforms ===
1	■ Keikyū Kurihama Line	for Keikyū Kurihama and Misakiguchi
2	■ Keikyū Kurihama Line	for Horinouchi; Keikyū Main Line for Yokohama, Shinagawa, and Sengakuji; Keikyū Airport Line for Haneda Airport Terminal 1·2 Station; Toei Asakusa Line for Shimbashi and Oshiage; Keisei Oshiage Line for Aoto; Keisei Main Line for Keisei Funabashi and Narita Airport; Hokuso Line for Shin-Kamagaya and Inba-Nihon-Idai; Narita Sky Access Line for Narita Airport

== History ==
Kitakurihama Station opened on December 1, 1942 as a station on the Tokyu Shōnan Line. At that time, it was named Shōnan Station (昭南駅, Shōnan-eki), using the same kanji as the war-time Japanese name for Singapore in celebration of the Japanese victory. On February 1, 1948, the station was renamed Shōnan-ida Station (湘南井田駅, Shōnan-ida-eki), using the kanji for the Shōnan area of Japan. It became a station on the Keihin Electric Express Railway from June 1, 1948. The station was renamed to its present name on November 1, 1963. A new station building was completed in December 1985.

Keikyū introduced station numbering to its stations on 21 October 2010; Kitakurihama Station was assigned station number KK66.

== Passenger statistics ==
In fiscal 2019, the station was used by an average of 25,627 passengers daily.

The passenger figures for previous years are as shown below.

Fiscal year	daily average
2005	26,628
2010	25,188
2015	27,581

== Surrounding area ==
- Japan National Route 134
- Negishi Park (Traffic Park, Swimming Pool)
- Kitakurihama Shopping Street

== See also ==
- List of railway stations in Japan
