= Shin-ōtsu Station =

Railway station in Yokosuka, Kanagawa Prefecture, Japan

KK65 Shin-ōtsu Station 新大津駅
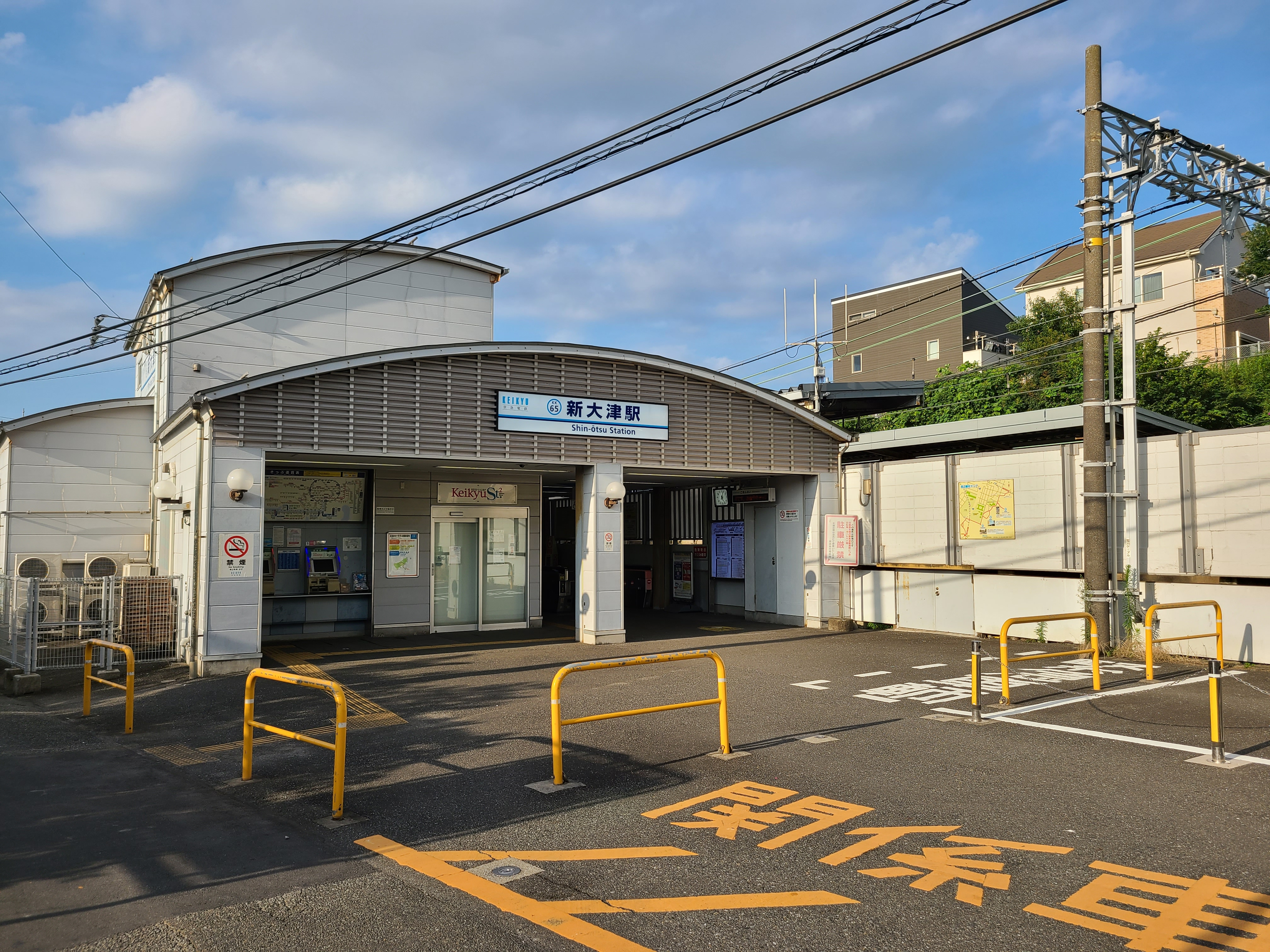
- Shin-ōtsu Station, August 2020

General information
- Location: 4-7-1 Ōtsu, Yokosuka-shi, Kanagawa-ken 239-0808; Japan
- Coordinates: 35°15′24.84″N 139°41′24.40″E
- Operator: Keikyū
- Line: Keikyū Kurihama Line
- Distance: 53.1 km from Shinagawa
- Platforms: 2 side platforms
- Connections: Bus stop

Construction
- Accessible: Yes

Other information
- Station code: KK65
- Website: Official website

History
- Opened: December 1, 1942
- Former names: Narukami (until 1948)

Passengers
- FY2019: 6,797 daily

Services
Preceding station	Keikyu	Following station
Kitakurihama KK66 towards Misakiguchi	Evening Wing	Horinouchi One-way operation
Kitakurihama KK66 towards Misakiguchi	Kurihama Line Limited Express (Kaitoku) Limited Express (Tokkyū)	Horinouchi KK61 Terminus
Kitakurihama KK66 towards Keikyū Kurihama	Kurihama Line Local	Horinouchi KK61 Terminus
Location
- Location within Kanagawa Prefecture Location within Japan

Shin-ōtsu Station (新大津駅, Shin-ōtsu-eki) is a passenger railway station located in the city of Yokosuka, Kanagawa Prefecture, Japan, operated by the private railway company Keikyū.

== Lines ==
Shin-ōtsu Station is served by the Keikyū Kurihama Line and is located 0.8 rail kilometers from the junction at Horinouchi Station, and 53.1 km from the starting point of the Keikyū Main Line at Shinagawa Station in Tokyo.

== Station layout ==
The station consists of two opposed side platforms connected to the station building by a footbridge.

=== Platforms ===
1	■ Keikyū Kurihama Line	for Keikyū Kurihama and Misakiguchi
2	■ Keikyū Kurihama Line	for Horinouchi; Keikyū Main Line for Yokohama, Shinagawa, and Sengakuji; Keikyū Airport Line for Haneda Airport; Toei Asakusa Line for Shimbashi and Oshiage; Keisei Oshiage Line for Aoto; Keisei Main Line for Keisei Funabashi and Narita Airport; Hokuso Line for Shin-Kamagaya and Inba-Nihon-Idai; Narita Sky Access Line for Narita Airport

== History ==
The station opened on December 1, 1942 as Narukami Station (鳴神駅). It was renamed Shin-ōtsu on February 1, 1948.

== Passenger statistics ==
In fiscal 2019, the station was used by an average of 6,797 passengers daily.

The passenger figures for previous years are as shown below.

Fiscal year	daily average
2005	5,969
2010	5,511
2015	6,835

== Surrounding area ==
- Kanagawa Prefectural Yokosuka Otsu High School
- Yokosuka City Otsu Junior High School
- Yokosuka City Otsu Elementary School
- Yokosuka City Negishi Elementary School

== See also ==
- List of railway stations in Japan
