= Maborikaigan Station =

Railway station in Yokosuka, Kanagawa Prefecture, Japan

KK63 Maborikaigan Station 馬堀海岸駅
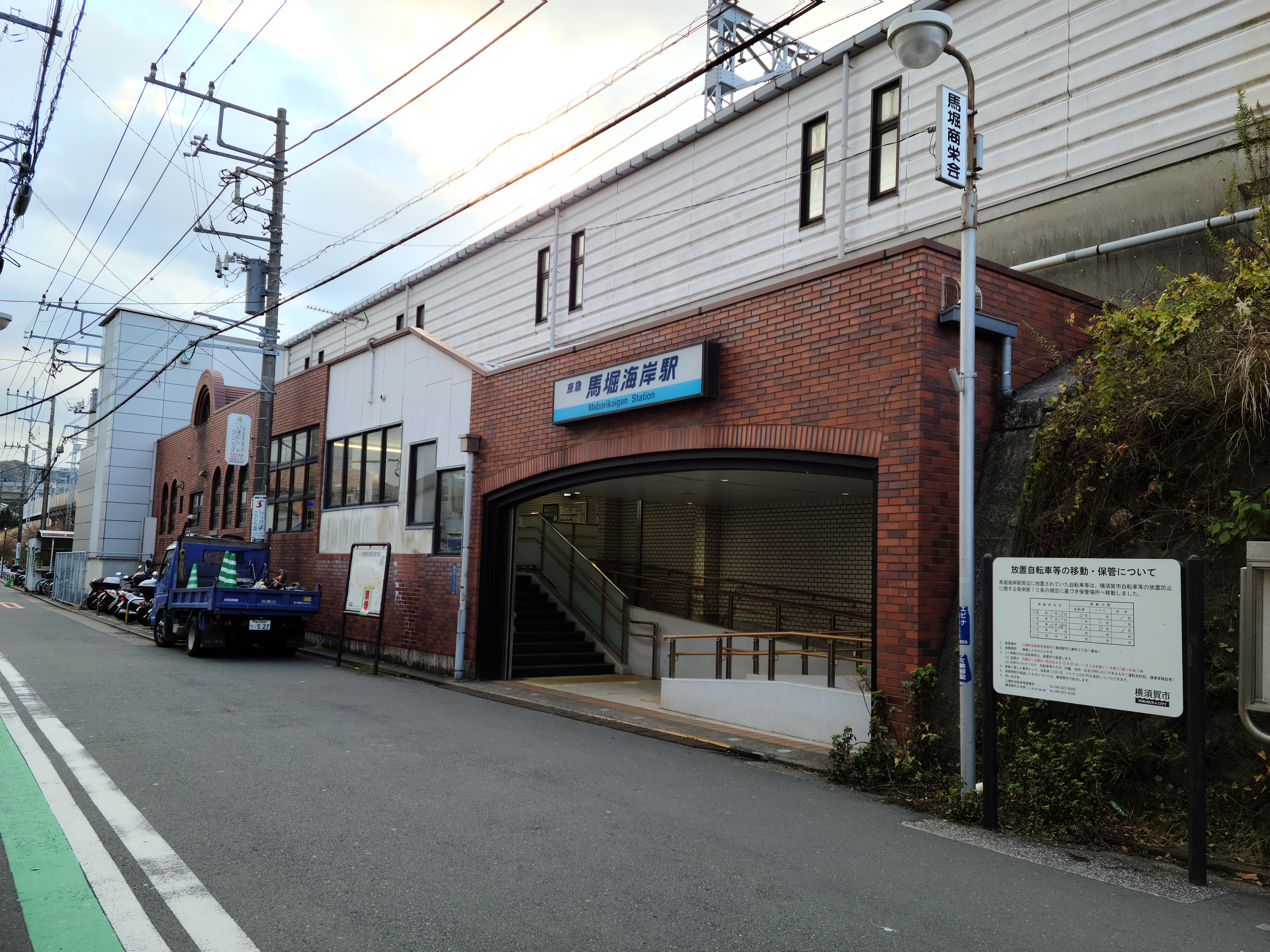
- Entrance to Maborikaigan Station, February 2021

General information
- Location: 3-20-1 Mabori-cho, Yokosuka-shi, Kanagawa-ken 239-0802; Japan
- Coordinates: 35.2599°N 139.7075°E
- Operator: Keikyū
- Line: Keikyū Main Line
- Distance: 54.2 km from Shinagawa
- Platforms: 2 side platforms
- Tracks: 2
- Connections: Bus stop

Other information
- Station code: KK63
- Website: Official website

History
- Opened: 1 April 1930

Passengers
- FY2019: 9,045 daily

Services
Preceding station	Keikyu	Following station
Uraga KK64 Terminus	Main Line Limited Express (Tokkyū) Local	Keikyū Ōtsu KK62 towards Sengakuji
Location
- Location within Kanagawa Prefecture Location within Japan

Maborikaigan Station (馬堀海岸駅, Maborikaigan-eki) is a passenger railway station located in the city of Yokosuka, Kanagawa Prefecture, Japan, operated by the private railway company Keikyū.

== Lines ==
Maborikaigan Station is served by the Keikyū Main Line and is located 54.2 kilometers from the northern terminus of the line at Shinagawa Station in Tokyo.

== Station layout ==
The station consists of two elevated opposed side platforms with the station building underneath.

=== Platforms ===
1	■ Keikyū Main Line	for Uraga
2	■ Keikyū Main Line	for Yokohama, Haneda Airport, Shinagawa, Sengakuji; Toei Asakusa Line for Oshiage

== History ==
Maborikaigan Station opened on April 1, 1930.

Keikyū introduced station numbering to its stations on 21 October 2010; Maborikaigan Station was assigned station number KK63.

== Passenger statistics ==
In fiscal 2019, the station was used by an average of 9,045 passengers daily.

The passenger figures for previous years are as shown below.

Fiscal year	daily average
2005	11,054
2010	10,169
2015	9,729

== Surrounding area ==
- National Defense Academy of Japan
- Yokosuka City Maboricho Elementary School
- Yokosuka City Maboricho Junior High School

== See also ==
- List of railway stations in Japan
