= Miurakaigan Station =

Railway station in Miura, Kanagawa Prefecture, Japan

KK71 Miurakaigan Station 三浦海岸駅
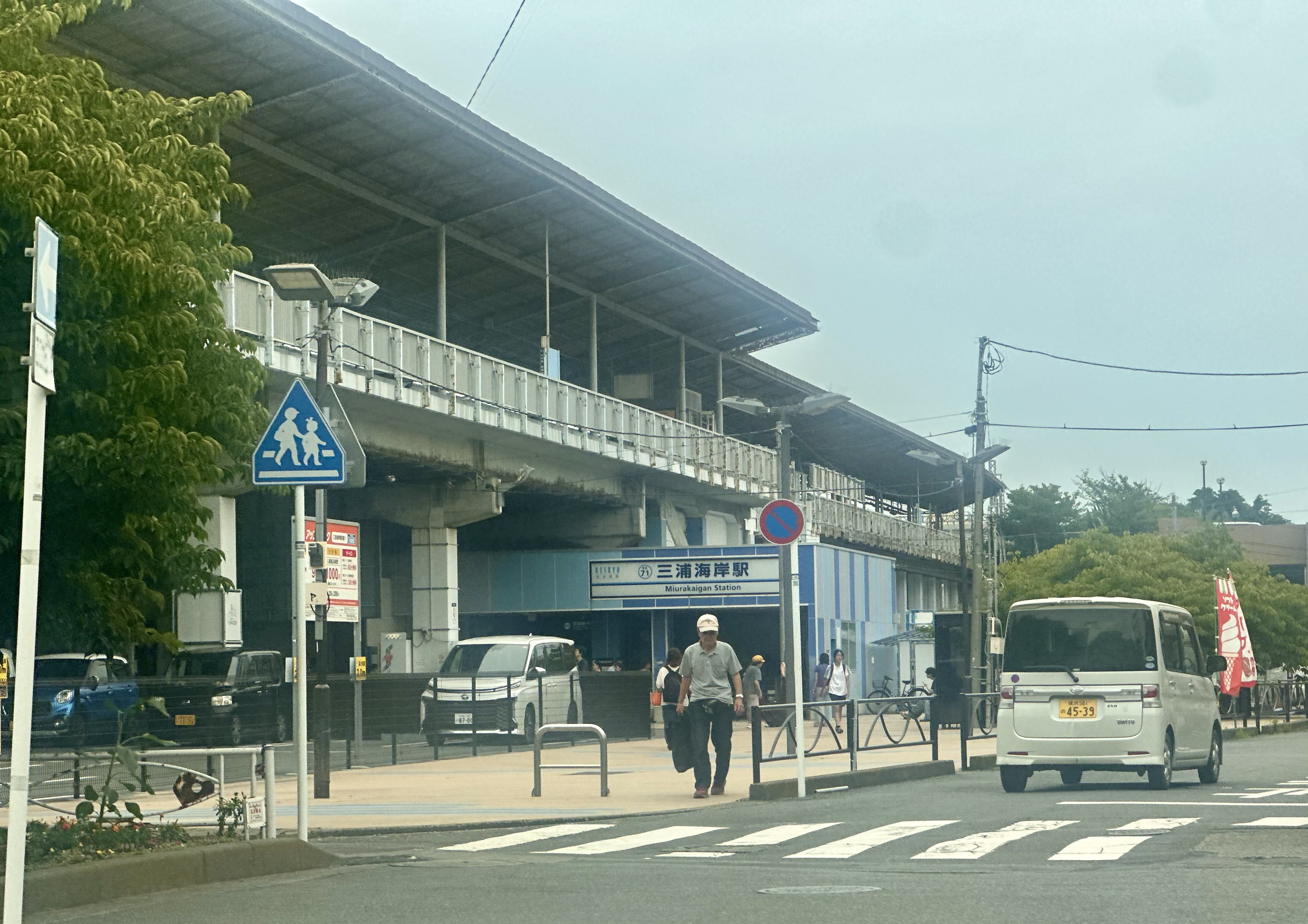
- Miurakaigan Station in July 2026

General information
- Location: 1497 Kamimiyada, Minamishitaura-machi, Miura-shi, Kanagawa-ken 238-0101; Japan
- Coordinates: 35°11′17.08″N 139°39′12.20″E
- Operator: Keikyū
- Line: Keikyu Kurihama Line
- Distance: 63.5 km from Shinagawa
- Platforms: 2 side platforms
- Tracks: 2
- Connections: Bus stop

Construction
- Accessible: Yes

Other information
- Station code: KK71
- Website: Official website (in Japanese)

History
- Opened: 7 July 1966

Passengers
- FY2019: 10,981 daily

Services
| Preceding station | Keikyu | Following station |
|---|---|---|
| Terminus | Morning Wing | Yokosuka-chūō KK59 towards Sengakuji |
| Misakiguchi KK72 Terminus | Evening Wing | Tsukuihama One-way operation |
| Misakiguchi KK72 Terminus | Kurihama Line Limited Express (Kaitoku) Limited Express (Tokkyū) | Tsukuihama KK70 towards Horinouchi |
Location
- Location within Kanagawa Prefecture

Miurakaigan Station (三浦海岸駅, Miurakaigan-eki) is a passenger railway station located in the city of Miura, Kanagawa Prefecture, Japan, operated by the private railway company Keikyū.

== Lines ==
Miurakaigan Station is served by the Keikyū Kurihama Line and is located 11.2 rail kilometers from the junction at Horinouchi Station, and 63.5 km from the starting point of the Keikyū Main Line at Shinagawa Station in Tokyo.

=== Platforms ===
| 1 | ■ Keikyū Kurihama Line | for Misakiguchi |
| 2 | ■ Keikyū Kurihama Line | for Keikyū Kurihama and Horinouchi; Keikyū Main Line for Yokohama, Shinagawa, and Sengakuji; Keikyū Airport Line for Haneda Airport; Toei Asakusa Line for Shimbashi and Oshiage; Keisei Oshiage Line for Aoto; Keisei Main Line for Keisei Funabashi and Narita Airport; Hokuso Line for Shin-Kamagaya and Inba-Nihon-Idai; Narita Sky Access Line for Narita Airport |

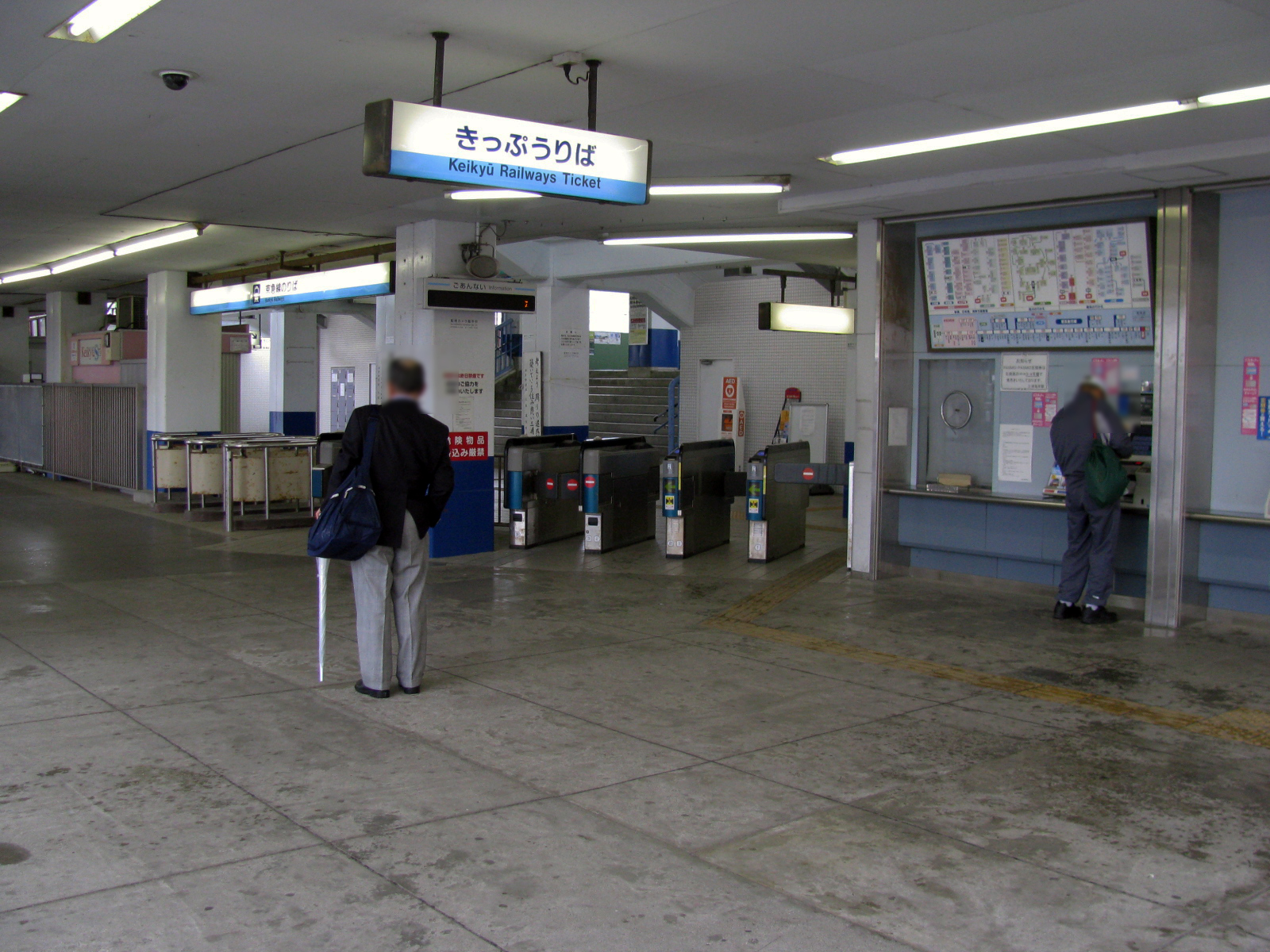
The ticket barriers in May 2008

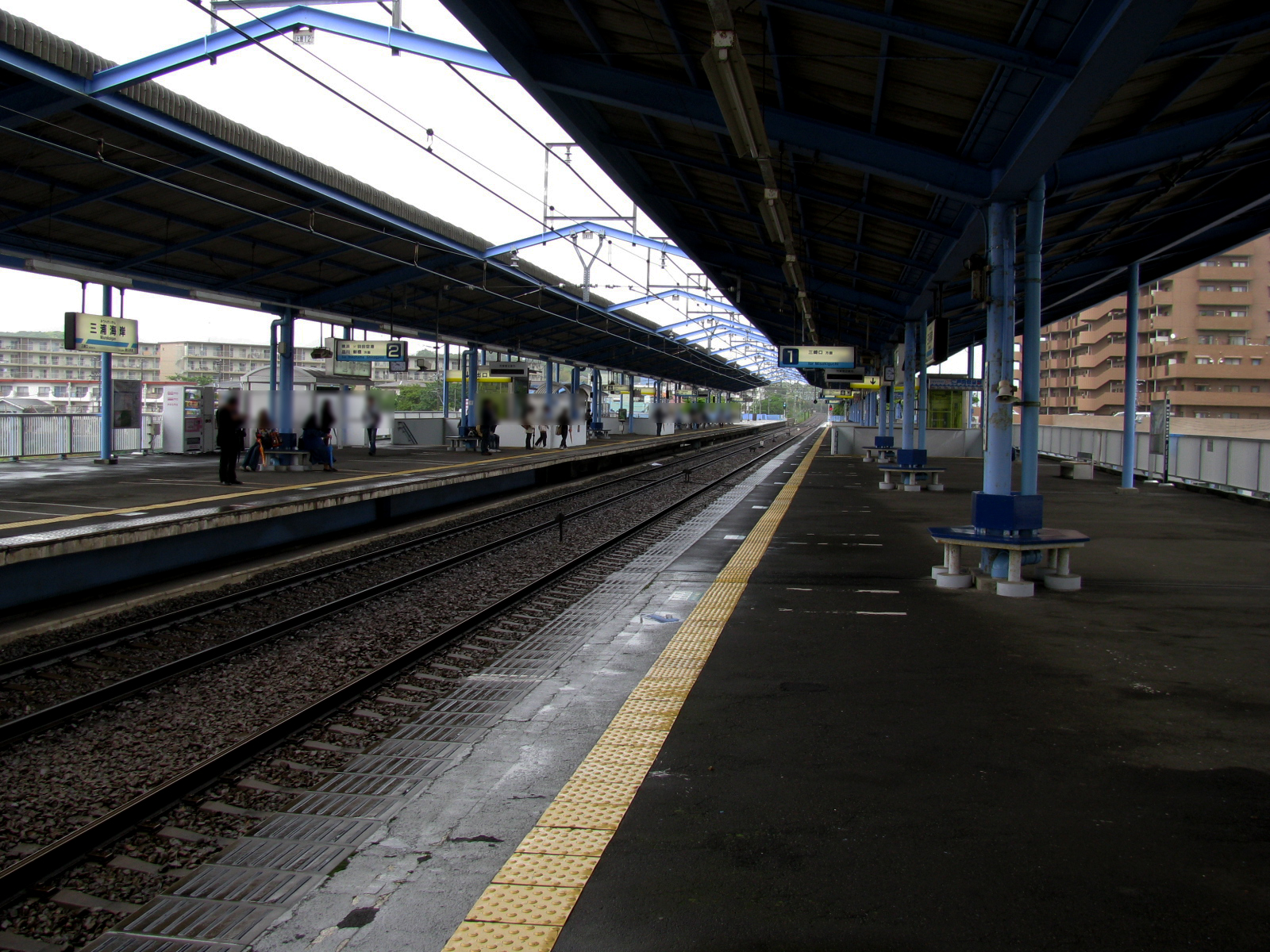
The view from the down end of the platforms in May 2008

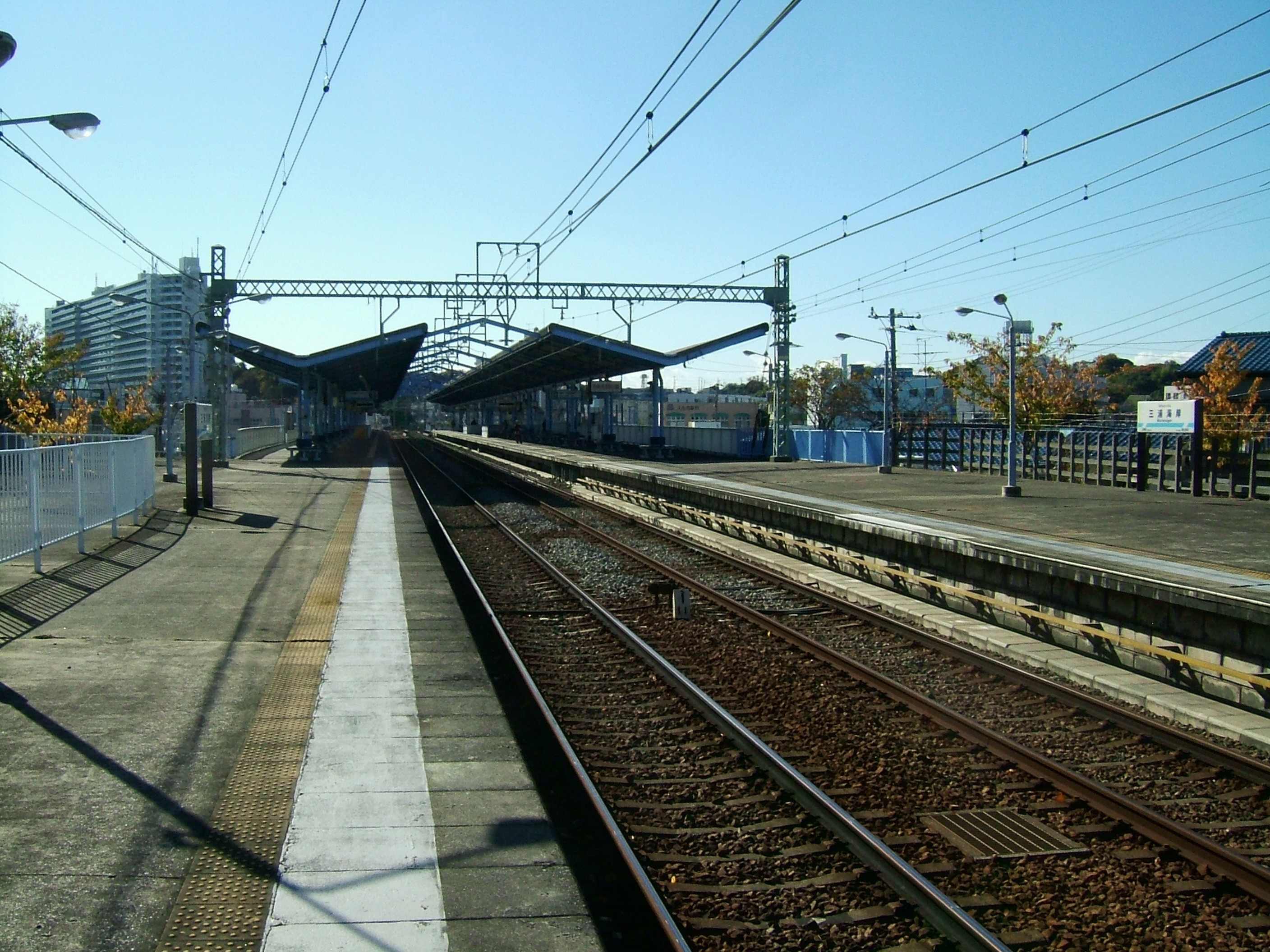
The view from the up end of the platforms in November 2008

== History ==
Miurakaigan Station opened on July 7, 1966, as the southern terminus of the Kurihama Line. In April 1975, the Kurihama Line was extended one station beyond Miurakaigan to the present terminus at Misakiguchi Station.

In October 2016, an experimental platform edge door system was installed for evaluation purposes on platform 1 for a period of approximately one year. The "Dokodemo Door" (どこでもドア) platform edge door system developed by Mitsubishi Heavy Industries Transportation Equipment Engineering & Service is designed to handle trains with two, three or four doors per car, and the temporary installation is just one car length long.

Keikyū introduced station numbering to its stations on 21 October 2010; Miurakaigan Station was assigned station number KK71.

== Passenger statistics ==
In fiscal 2019, the station was used by an average of 10,981 passengers daily.

The passenger figures for previous years are as shown below.

| Fiscal year | daily average |
|---|---|
| 2005 | 12,635 |
| 2010 | 12,233 |
| 2015 | 11,701 |

== Surrounding area ==
- Miura Beach
- National Route 134

== See also ==
- List of railway stations in Japan
