= Yokosuka =

Yokosuka 横須賀市
- Core city
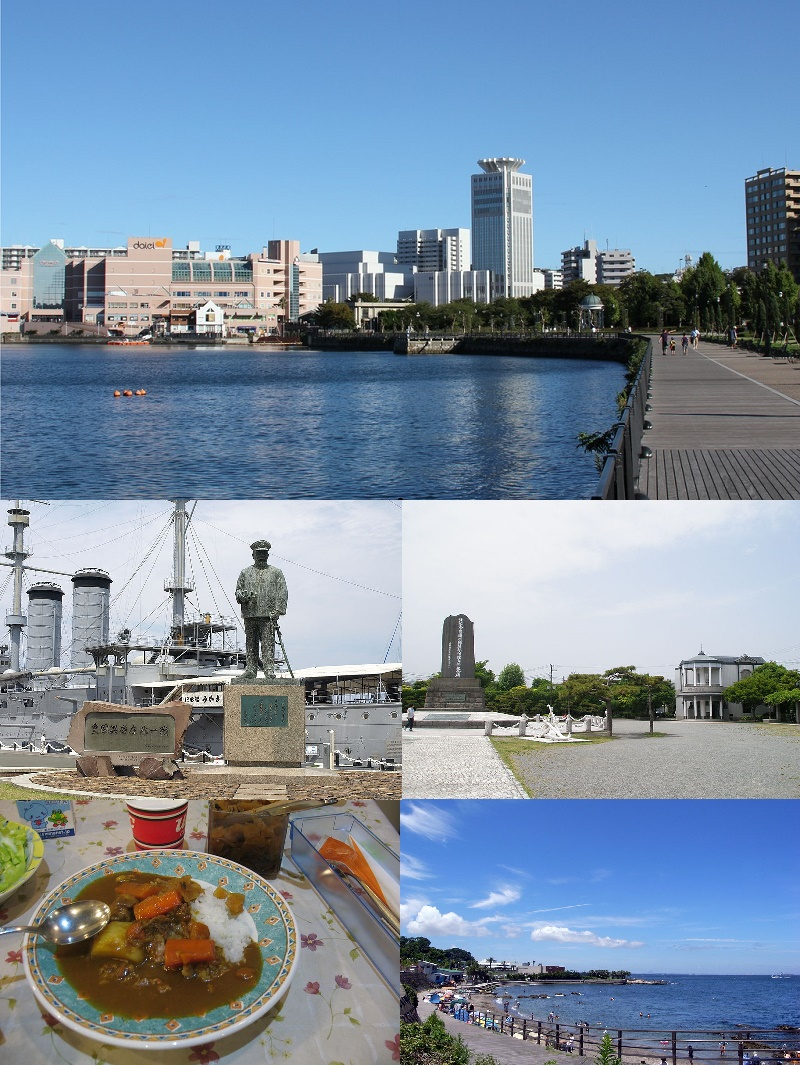
- Top: View of downtown Yokosuka from Verny Seaside Park, Middle: Mikasa Battleship Monument and Heihachirō Togō Statue, Kurihama Matthew Perry Park, Bottom: Yokosuka Naval Curry, Kannon Cape, and seaside park (all item for left to right)

- Flag Seal

- Yokosuka in Kanagawa Prefecture

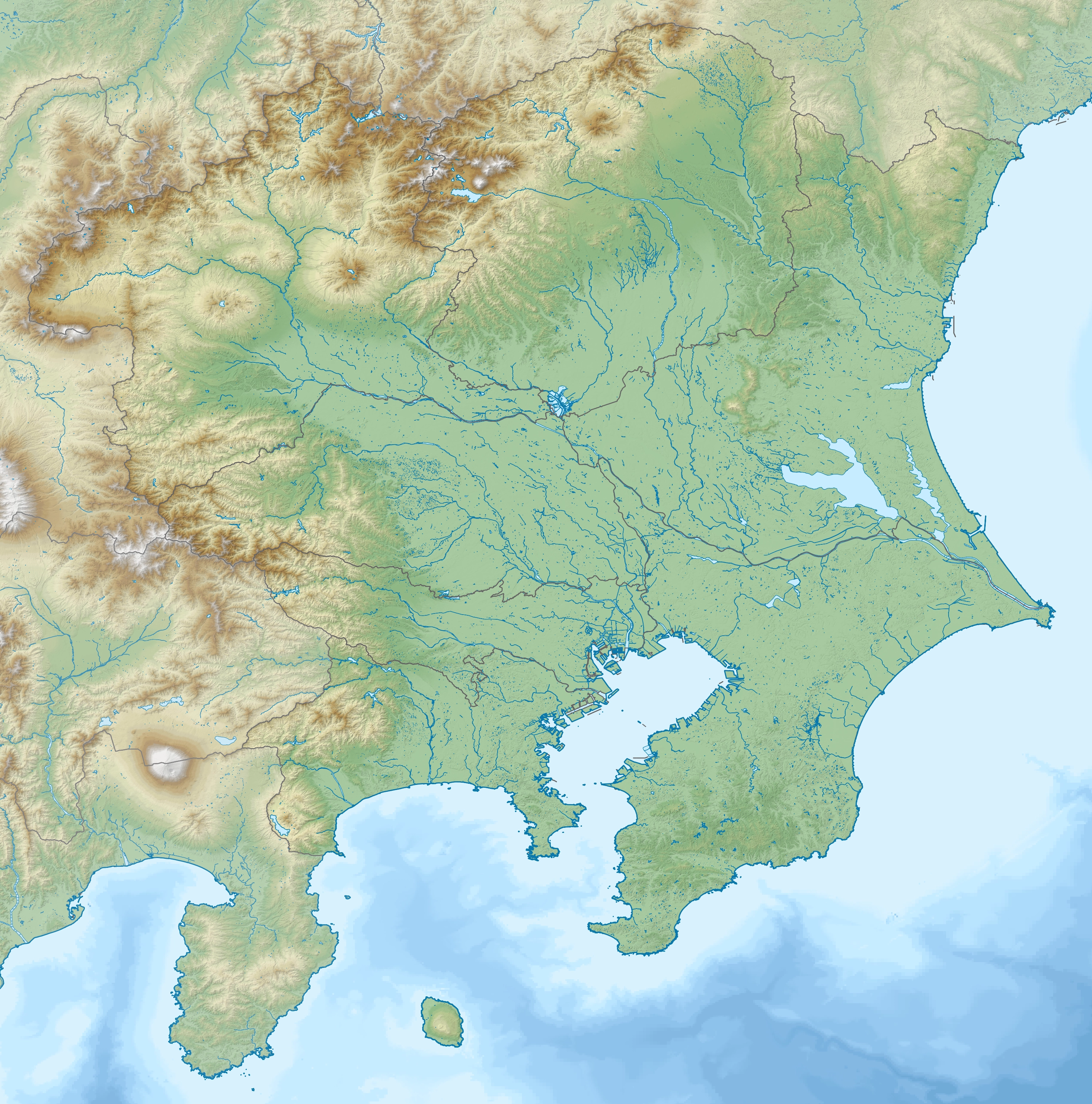
- Yokusuka in Japan Yokusuka in Kanto Region Yokusuka in Kanagawa Prefecture
- Coordinates: 35°16′53.4″N 139°40′19.5″E
- Country: Japan
- Region: Kantō
- Prefecture: Kanagawa

Government
  - Mayor: Katsuaki Kamiji

Area
  - Total: 100.81 km^{2} (38.92 sq mi)

Population (February 1, 2024)
  - Total: 373,797
  - Density: 3,708/km^{2} (9,600/sq mi)
- Time zone: UTC+09:00
- Postal code: 238-8550
- Area code: 14201-8
- Website: city.yokosuka.kanagawa.jp

Yokosuka (Japanese: 横須賀市, Hepburn: Yokosuka-shi; pronounced [jokosɯ̥ka]) is a city in Kanagawa Prefecture, Japan.

As of February 2024, the city has a population of 373,797, and a population density of 3,708 inhabitants per square kilometre (9,600/sq mi). The total area is 100.7 km^{2} (38.9 sq mi). Yokosuka is the 11th-most populous city in the Greater Tokyo Area, and the 12th in the Kantō region. The city is home to United States Fleet Activities Yokosuka.

== Geography ==
Yokosuka occupies most of Miura Peninsula, and is bordered by the mouth of Tokyo Bay to the east and Sagami Bay on the Pacific Ocean on the west.

=== Surrounding municipalities ===
- Hayama
- Kanazawa-ku, Yokohama
- Miura
- Zushi

== History ==
=== Pre-modern period ===
The area around present-day Yokosuka City has been inhabited for thousands of years. Archaeologists have found stone tools and shell middens from the Japanese Paleolithic period and ceramic shards from the Jōmon and Kofun periods at numerous locations in the area. During the Heian period, local warlord Muraoka Tamemichi established Kinugasa Castle in 1063. He became the ancestor of the Miura clan, which subsequently dominated eastern Sagami Province for the next several hundred years. The Miura clan supported Minamoto no Yoritomo in the foundation of the Kamakura shogunate, but were later annihilated by Hōjō Tokiyori in 1247. However, the family name was reassigned to a supporter of the Hōjō clan, and the Miura continued to rule Miura Peninsula through the Muromachi period until their defeat at Arai Castle in a 1518 attack by Hōjō Sōun. Following the defeat of the Later Hōjō clan at the Battle of Odawara, Toyotomi Hideyoshi transferred Tokugawa Ieyasu to take control over the Kantō region, including Yokosuka in 1590.

The English sailor William Adams, the first Briton to set foot in Japan, arrived at Uraga aboard the Dutch trading vessel Liefde in 1600. In 1612, he was granted the title of samurai and a fief in Hemi within the boundaries of present-day Yokosuka, due to his services to the Tokugawa shogunate. A monument to Adams (called Miura Anjin in Japanese) is a local landmark in Yokosuka.

During the Edo period, Yokosuka tenryō territory was controlled directly by the Tokugawa shogunate, but administered through various hatamoto. Due to its strategic location at the entrance to Tokyo Bay, the Shogunate established the post of Uraga Bugyō in 1720, and all shipping into the bay was required to stop for inspection. As concerns over the increasing number of incursions by foreign vessels and attempts to end Japan's self-imposed national seclusion policy, the Shogunate established a number of coastal artillery batteries around Yokosuka, including an outpost at Ōtsu in 1842. However, despite these efforts, in 1853, United States naval Commodore Matthew Perry arrived in Tokyo Bay with his fleet of Black Ships and came ashore at Kurihama, in southern Yokosuka, leading to the opening of diplomatic and trade relations between Japan and the United States. The Kanrin Maru sailed from Yokosuka in 1860 with the first Japanese diplomatic embassy to the United States in 1860.

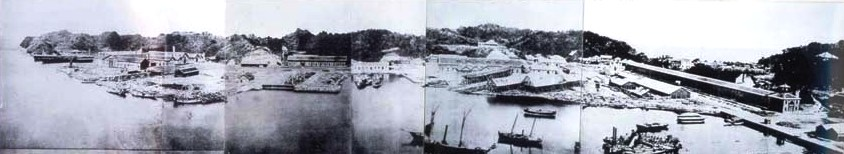
Construction of the Yokosuka arsenal c. 1870

During the turbulent Bakumatsu period, the Shogunate selected Yokosuka as the site for a modern naval base, and hired the French engineer Léonce Verny in 1865 to oversee the development of shipbuilding facilities, beginning with Yokosuka Iron Foundry. Yokosuka Naval Arsenal became the first modern arsenal to be created in Japan. The construction of the arsenal was the central point of a global modern infrastructure, that was to prove an important first step for the modernization of Japan's industry. Modern buildings, the Hashirimizu waterway, foundries, brick factories, and technical schools to train Japanese technicians were established.

=== Meiji period to present ===
After the Meiji Restoration, the arsenal was taken over by the Imperial Japanese Navy, and the area of modern Yokosuka was reorganized into Uraga Town and numerous villages within Miura District, Kanagawa Prefecture. Yokosuka Village was elevated to town status in 1878 and was made the capital of Miura District. In 1889, the Yokosuka Line railway was opened, connecting Yokosuka to Yokohama and Tokyo. Yokosuka was elevated to city status on February 15, 1907. From 1916, Oppama in Yokosuka was developed as the Yokosuka Naval Air Technical Arsenal, and many of the combat aircraft subsequently operated by the Imperial Japanese Navy Air Service were developed or tested at Yokosuka. Yokosuka Naval Arsenal also continued to expand in the early 20th century, and its production included battleships such as Yamashiro, and aircraft carriers such as Hiryū and Shōkaku. Smaller warships were constructed at the privately owned Uraga Dock Company. Yokosuka Naval District was the home port of the IJN 1st Fleet.

The Great Kantō earthquake of 1923 caused severe damage to Yokosuka, including the naval base which lost two years' operations of oil supplies. The city continued to expand in 1933 with the annexation of neighboring Kinugasa Village and Taura Town in 1933 and Kurihama Village in 1937. In 1943, the city also annexed the neighboring towns and villages of Uraga, Kitashitaura, Okusu, Nagai and Takeyama, as well as Zushi.

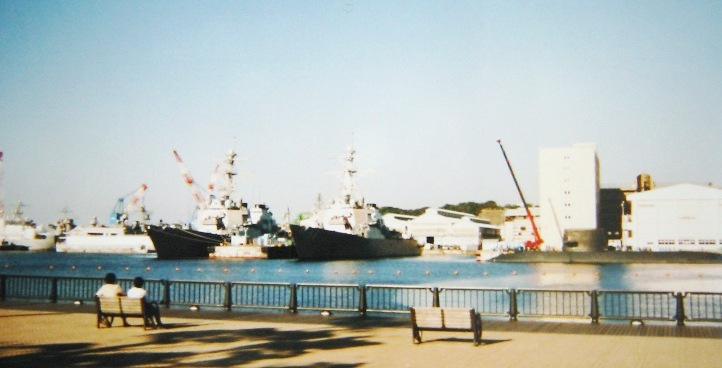
The U.S. Navy base at Yokosuka

During World War II, Yokosuka was bombed on April 18, 1942, by American North American B-25 Mitchell bombers in the Doolittle Raid with little damage as a retaliation to the attack on Pearl Harbor. Aside from minor sporadic tactical air raids by United States Navy aircraft, it was not bombed again during the war; however, from 1938 to 1945 more than 260 caves in more than 20 separate tunnel/cave networks were built throughout the area, with at least 27 kilometers of known tunnels within the grounds of Yokosuka Naval Base. Many more tunnels are scattered throughout the surrounding areas. During the war, these tunnels and caves provided areas in which work could be done in secrecy, safe from air attacks. A 500-bed hospital, a large electrical power generating facility, and a midget submarine factory and warehouse were among the many facilities built. American occupation forces landed at Yokosuka on August 30, 1945, after the surrender of Japan, and the naval base has been used by the US Navy since that time. The caves were used for storage and as an emergency shelter during the Korean War.

From the 1950s, United States Fleet Activities Yokosuka has been home port for the United States Seventh Fleet, and played a critical support role in the Korean War and the Vietnam War. Yokosuka was the site of many anti-war protests during the late 1960s and 1970s. The nuclear-powered USS George Washington, formerly based at Yokosuka, was the first U.S. nuclear-powered ship that had been permanently based in Japan. The Japan Maritime Self-Defense Force also operates a military port next to the American base, as well as numerous training facilities at scattered locations around the city. For those reasons, there are a few hundred Americans and a thousand Filipinos in Yokosuka.

In 2001, Yokosuka was designated as a core city, with increased autonomy from the central government.

== Economy ==
Aside from the economic impact of its various military facilities, Yokosuka is also an industrial city, with factories operated by Nissan Motors and its affiliated subsidiaries employing thousands of local residents. The Nissan Leaf, Nissan Cube, and Nissan Juke models are assembled in the 520,000-square-metre (5,600,000 sq ft) Oppama plant in Yokosuka. The factory began operations in 1961 where the Nissan Bluebird was originally built. Every May, there is a festival celebrating Japanese curry, which draws 50,000 attendees each year. The plant is adjacent to Nissan's Research and Development Center, the Oppama Proving Ground and the Oppama Wharf, from which Nissan ships vehicles made at Oppama and Nissan's other two Japanese vehicle assembly plants to other regions of Japan and overseas.

The Yokosuka Research Park, established in 1997, is a major center for the Japanese telecommunications industry, and is where many of the wireless, mobile communications related companies have set up their research and development centers and joint testing facilities.

== Demographics ==
Per Japanese census data, Yokosuka's population peaked around the year 1990 and has declined since then. Foreign citizens in Yokosuka are mainly Filipinos, Koreans, Chinese, and Americans.

Historical population
Year	Pop.	±%
1920	96,351	—
1930	110,301	+14.5%
1940	237,523	+115.3%
1950	250,533	+5.5%
1960	287,309	+14.7%
1970	347,576	+21.0%
1980	421,107	+21.2%
1990	433,358	+2.9%
2000	428,645	−1.1%
2010	418,325	−2.4%
2020	388,078	−7.2%

== Transportation ==
=== Rail ===
- JR East – Yokosuka Line
  - Taura – Yokosuka – Kinugasa – Kurihama
- Keikyu Main Line
  - Oppama – Keikyū Taura – Anjinzuka – Hemi – Shioiri – Yokosuka-Chūō – Kenritsu Daigaku – Horinouchi – Keikyū Ōtsu – Mabori-Kaigan – Uraga
- Keikyu Kurihama Line
  - Horinouchi – Shin-Ōtsu – Kita-Kurihama – Keikyū Kurihama – YRP Nobi – Keikyū Nagasawa – Tsukuihama

=== Road ===
- National Route 16
- National Route 134
- National Route 357

== Education ==
Yokosuka's public elementary and junior high schools are operated by the Yokosuka Education System, a department of the Yokosuka City Department of Education. Many of Yokosuka's public high schools, including Yokosuka High School, are operated by the Kanagawa Prefectural Board of Education.

The city operates one municipal high school, Yokosuka Sogo High School.

== Energy disasters ==
On 26 October 2011 Yokosuka held its annual nuclear accident evacuation drill. This drill was first held in 2008 when the nuclear-powered aircraft carrier USS George Washington was employed at the US naval base near this city. About 70 people, residents and firefighters took part in the drill. Firefighters ordered the residents of the city to stay indoors, assuming abnormally high levels of radiation around the US base. Radioactive contamination was controlled in the emergency response center by city officials. The US Navy refused to take part this, because of the supposed impossibility of radiation leaking outside the base. In December 2011, another drill was scheduled with Yokosuka and other cities to prepare for the possibility that people on board the ship might be exposed to radiation.

One unintended consequence of anti-nuclear sentiment is the construction of coal-fired power plants, which causes air pollution and worsens global warming. As of 2020, two coal-fired power plants are proposed to be built in Yokosuka, even despite the climate emergency. These coal-fired power plants are being built without a full environmental review, and local residents are suing the government of Japan over its construction. Environment minister Shinjirō Koizumi has been "a target of the activists' wrath" because of his support for this project.

== Sister cities ==
Yokosuka has twin-town relationships with four other cities. They are (in chronological order):

- Corpus Christi, Texas, United States, since 18 October 1962
- Brest, France, since 26 November 1970
- Fremantle, Western Australia, Australia, since 25 April 1979
- (United Kingdom) Medway, Kent, UK, since 26 August 1998
- Mazyr, Belarus, since 2008
- Bharatpur, Nepal, since 15 March 2023

Yokosuka has a friendship city relationship with one city:

- Aizuwakamatsu, Fukushima, Japan, since 17 April 2005

== Local attractions ==
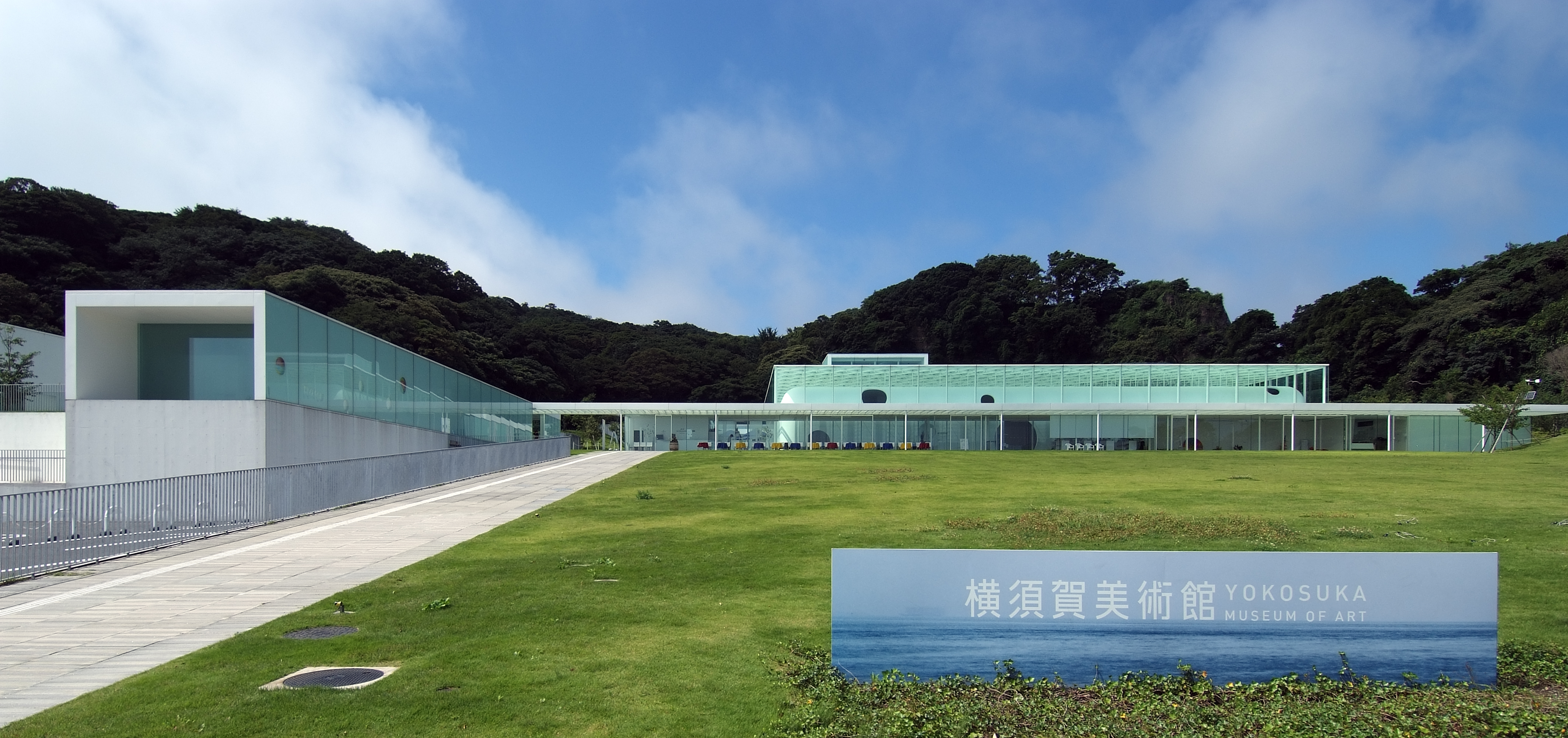
Yokosuka Museum of Art, design by Riken Yamamoto in 2007

Sarushima is an uninhabited island in the Tokyo Bay, accessible by ferry from Yokosuka.

The Mikasa, flagship of Admiral Togo at the Battle of Tsushima, built in Britain by Vickers, is preserved on dry land at Yokosuka. It is a museum, complete with actors dressed like members of the original crew, and can be visited for an entrance fee of 600 yen. It is the only pre-dreadnought battleship or British-built battleship still in existence.

The Club Alliance enlisted club, which lies just inside the main gate of Yokosuka Naval Base, opened in 1983. It replaced the old Club Alliance which was demolished to make way for the Prince Hotel. The old Club Alliance is where Ryudo Uzaki got his start playing rock and roll. "The Honch", a mecca for shopping and nightlife and located just outside the Yokosuka Naval Base's main gates, is a popular attraction for tourists and sailors stationed nearby, as well as local Japanese residents.

The Yokosuka Arts Theatre, part of the Bay Square complex by Kenzō Tange, is a venue for opera, orchestral concerts, chamber music, and films.

Dobuita Street is situated in Yokosuka, close to the U.S. naval base. Therefore, this High Street has a very American influence, with many shops accepting U.S. dollars. In the evening the street turns into the local bar and club district for the area.

A museum in memory of rock musician Hide, a native of Yokosuka, opened on July 20, 2000. It has been reported that Japan's former prime minister, Junichiro Koizumi, was influential in getting it built as he was a big fan of Hide's band X Japan. The museum stayed open, past its original three-year plan, for five years, before closing on 25 September 2005.

Yokosuka is considered a place of origin of sukajan jackets. These embroidered satin bombers are a popular souvenir from the city, especially the more expensive, handmade ones.

== In popular culture ==
Yokosuka, including Dobuita Street, is the setting for the 1999 video game Shenmue. Yokosuka is also depicted in the game's anime adaptation. City officials cooperated with animators. The 2000 PlayStation game Front Mission 3, and Shohei Imamura's 1961 New Wave film Pigs and Battleships take place in Yokosuka. Additionally, Yokosuka is the location of the climactic battle in the Godzilla film Terror of Mechagodzilla.

Yokosuka is a major location in the Arpeggio of Blue Steel franchise, where it serves as one of Japan's few remaining naval facilities, the only one equipped with a functional shipyard and maritime academy. Due to rising sea levels, the port is built above the ruins of the submerged original city's remains. All the main cast lived and attended school there before forming the privateer fleet Blue Steel that uses it as their home port.

Yokusuka is the main setting for the anime High School Fleet (Haifuri). In a world where a major earthquake has submerged most parts of Japan, Yokusuka remains one of the several main high schools that train high school girls to become Blue Mermaids. The main characters attend school at Yokusuka Girls' Marine High School and train in WW2 era IJN vessels. Major ships in the series include Musashi, Kongo, Admiral Graf Spee, and the Kagero class destroyer Harekaze.

== Notable people from Yokosuka ==
=== Politicians ===
- Junichiro Koizumi, former Prime Minister of Japan
- Yoriko Madoka, politician
- Yūto Yoshida, politician

=== Culture and the arts ===
- Hitoshi Ashinano, manga artist
- Kazumasa Hirai, author
- Miyako Ishiuchi, photographer
- Kazuo Kamimura, manga artist
- Kōji Kumeta, manga artist
- Kazutaka Miyatake, anime designer
- Minoru Nojima, pianist
- David Jay Reed, artist, actor, photographer, graphic designer, lecturer

=== Entertainment ===
- Donnalyn Bartolome, singer-actress
- Zach Bryan, singer-songwriter
- hide, musician
- Honoka Inoue, voice actress
- Kikuko Inoue, voice actress
- Lynn, voice actress
- Rika Ishikawa, singer
- Ichiro Ito, musician
- Kaede, dancer, model and actress, member of J-pop girlgroups Happiness and E-girls
- Yusuke Kamiji, actor
- Josh Kelly, actor
- Kie Kitano, gravure idol
- Kotaro Koizumi, actor
- Yōsuke Kubozuka, actor
- MAA, singer
- Eri Shingyōji, singer
- Kenchi Tachibana, dancer, member of Exile and Exile The Second
- Tetsuya, Dancer, member of Exile and Exile The Second

=== Athletes ===
- Rich Alvarez, professional basketball player
- Isao Inokuma, Olympic gold medalist judoka
- Naohiro Ishikawa, professional soccer player
- Junya Ito, football player
- Naoyuki Kotani, professional mixed martial artist
- Keith McDonald, baseball player
- Stan McQuay, IFBB professional bodybuilder
- Mark Muñoz, mixed martial artist
- Rei Nishiyama, Olympic gold medalist softball player
- Tetsuya Ōkubo, professional soccer player
- Hiroyuki Taniguchi, professional soccer player
- Shuhei Terada, professional soccer player
- Cameron Thomas, professional basketball player
- Marcus Thomas, professional football player
- Caol Uno, professional mixed martial artist
- Susumu Yokosuka, professional wrestler
- Shogo Akiyama, baseball player

=== Others ===
- Susumu Ishii, yakuza godfather
- Thomas Noguchi, doctor
- Tsutsumi Sakamoto, lawyer
- Ayumu Sasaki, motorcycle racer
