= Keikyū Ōtsu Station =

Railway station in Yokosuka, Kanagawa Prefecture, Japan

KK62 Keikyū Ōtsu Station 京急大津駅
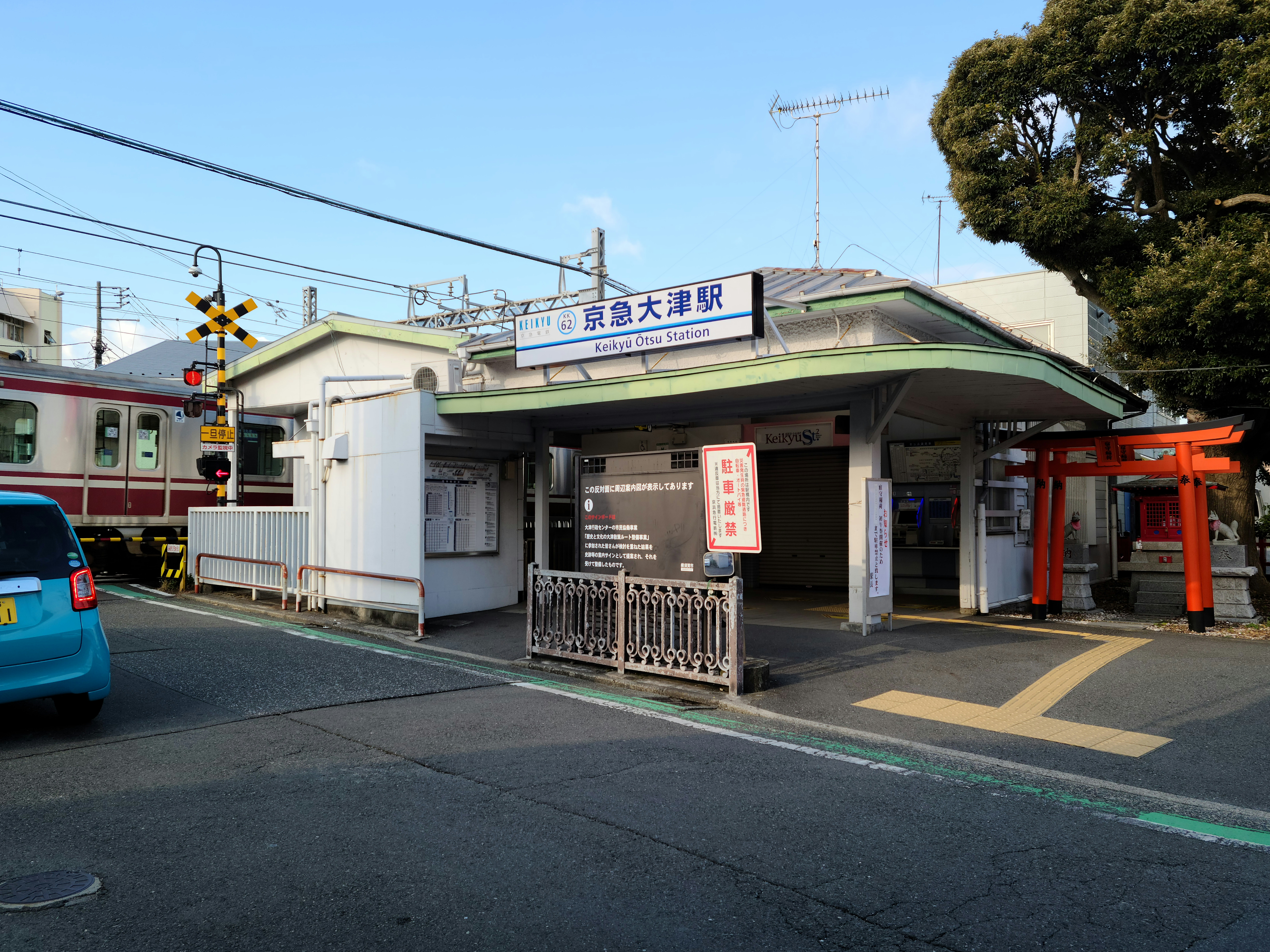
- Entrance to Keikyū Ōtsu Station, February 2021

General information
- Location: 1-30 Ōtsu-cho, Yokosuka-shi, Kanagawa-ken 239-0808; Japan
- Coordinates: 35°15′39″N 139°41′45.2″E
- Operator: Keikyū
- Line: Keikyū Main Line
- Distance: 53.1 km from Shinagawa
- Platforms: 2 side platforms
- Connections: Bus stop

Other information
- Station code: KK62
- Website: Official website

History
- Opened: April 1, 1930
- Former names: Shōnan Ōtsu; Keihin Ōtsu (until 1987)

Passengers
- 2019: 4,943 daily

Services
Preceding station	Keikyu	Following station
Maborikaigan KK63 towards Uraga	Main Line Limited Express (Tokkyū) Local	Horinouchi KK61 towards Sengakuji
Location
- Location within Kanagawa Prefecture Location within Japan

Keikyū Ōtsu Station (京急大津駅, Keikyū Ōtsu-eki) is a passenger railway station located in the city of Yokosuka, Kanagawa Prefecture, Japan, operated by the private railway company Keikyū.

== Lines ==
Keikyū Ōtsu Station is served by the Keikyū Main Line and is located 53.1 kilometers from the northern terminus of the line at Shinagawa Station in Tokyo.

== Station layout ==
The station consists of two opposed side platforms connected to the station building by a footbridge.

=== Platforms ===
1	■ Keikyū Main Line	for Uraga
2	■ Keikyū Main Line	for Yokohama, Haneda Airport Terminal 3, Shinagawa, Sengakuji, and Oshiage

== History ==
The station opened on April 1, 1934, as Shōnan Ōtsu Station (湘南大津駅). It was renamed Keihin Ōtsu Station (京浜大津駅) on November 1, 1963, and renamed to its present name on June 1, 1987.

Keikyū introduced station numbering to its stations on 21 October 2010; Keikyū Ōtsu Station was assigned station number KK62.

== Passenger statistics ==
In fiscal 2019, the station was used by an average of 4,943 passengers daily.

The passenger figures for previous years are as shown below.

Fiscal year	daily average
2005	5,841
2010	5,511
2015	5,109

== Surrounding area ==
- Yokosuka City Otsu Elementary School
- Yokosuka City Otsu Junior High School
- Kanagawa Prefectural Yokosuka Otsu High School

== See also ==
- List of railway stations in Japan
