= Miura, Kanagawa =

Miura 三浦市
- City
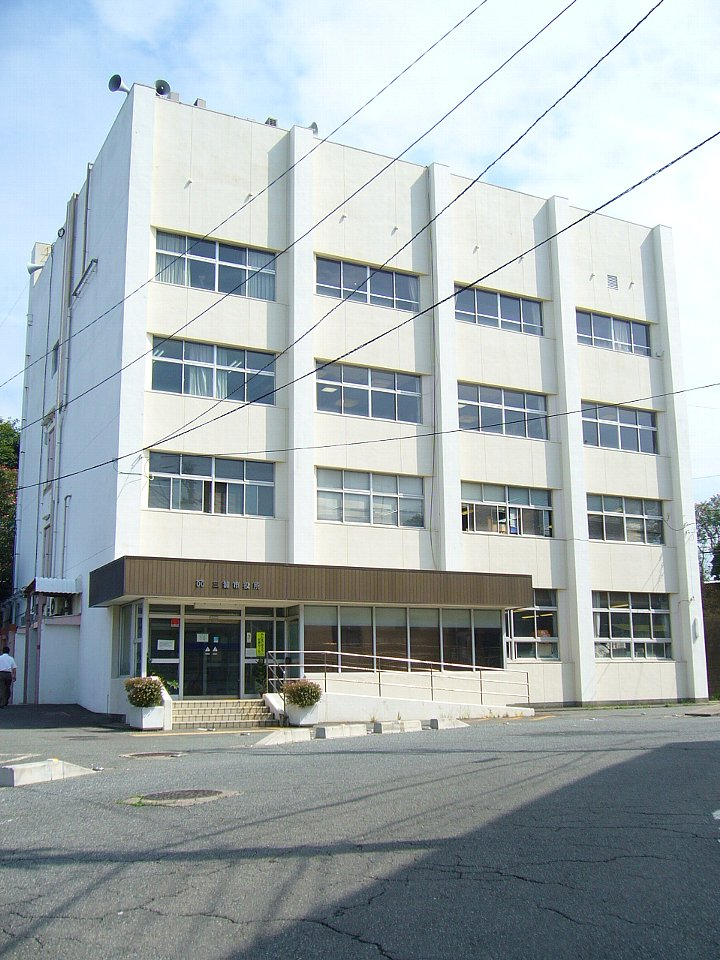
- Miura City Hall

- Flag Seal
- Interactive map of Miura
- Coordinates: 35°9′N 139°37′E
- Country: Japan
- Region: Kantō
- Prefecture: Kanagawa Prefecture

Government
  - Mayor: Kaichi Deguchi (since June 2025)

Area
  - Total: 32.05 km^{2} (12.37 sq mi)

Population (April 1, 2017)
  - Total: 44,132
  - Density: 1,377/km^{2} (3,566/sq mi)
- Time zone: UTC+9 (Japan Standard Time)
- Phone number: 046-882-1111
- Address: 1-1 Shiroyama-cho, Miura-shi, Kanagawa-ken 238-0298
- Climate: Cfa
- Website: http://www.city.miura.kanagawa.jp/
- Symbols
- Bird: Japanese cormorant
- Flower: Crinum
- Tree: Japanese black pine

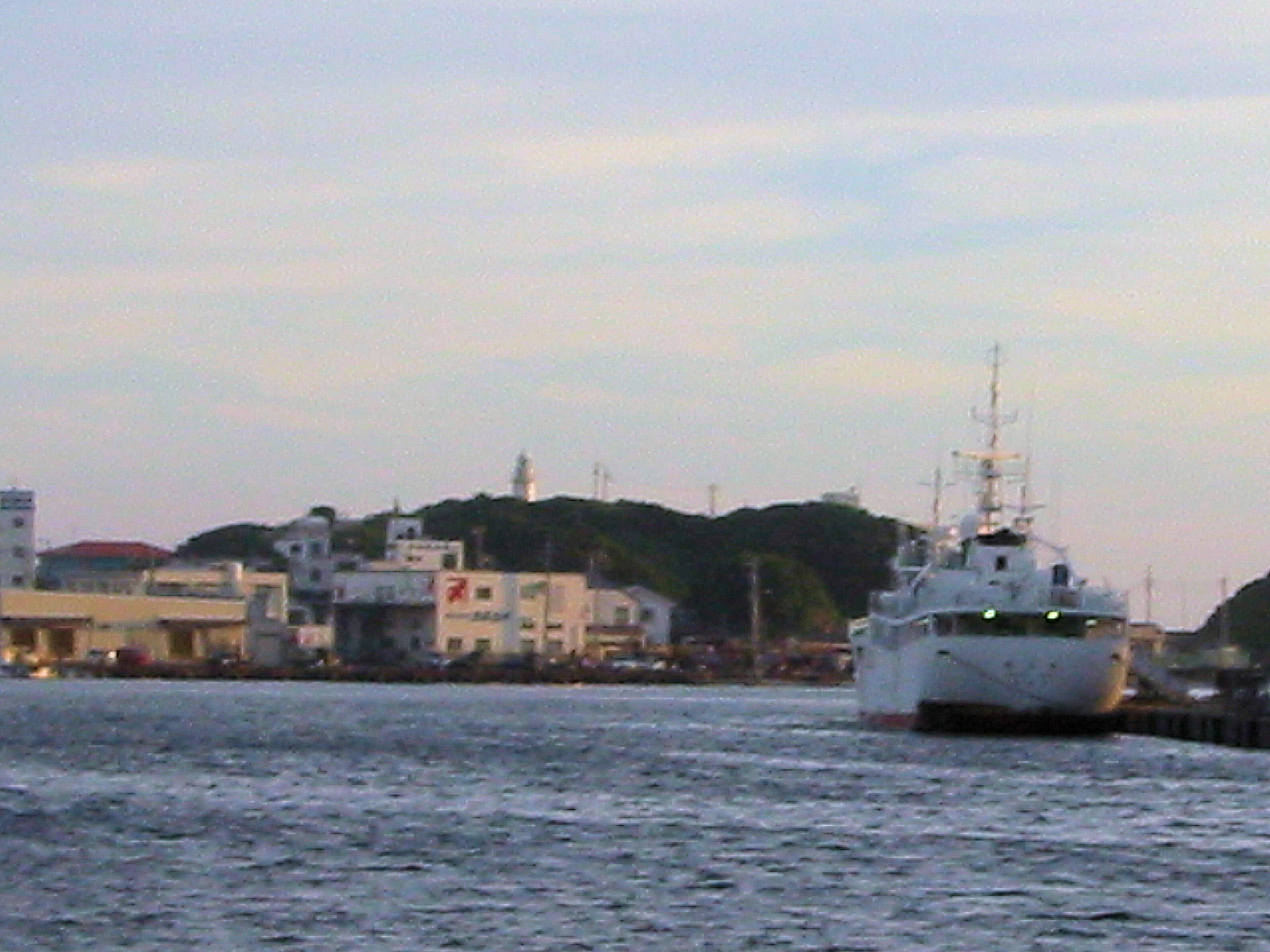
Misaki harbor at sunset, looking south towards Jōgashima

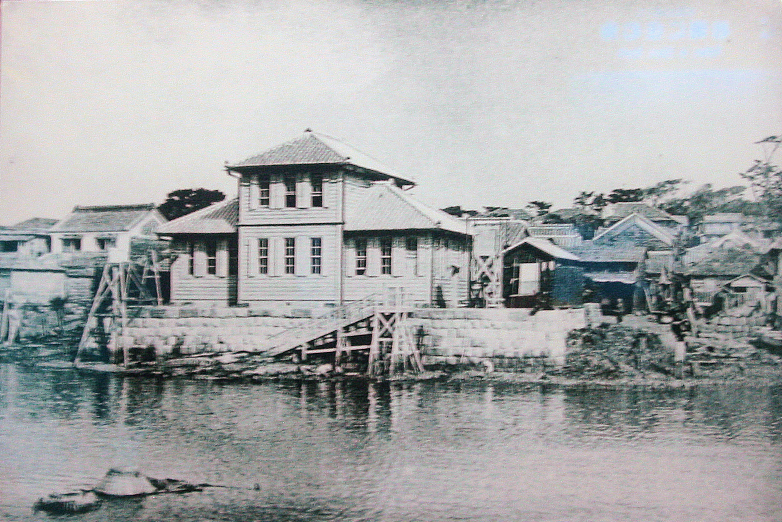
An 1886 view of Misaki: the University of Tokyo Marine Experiment Center

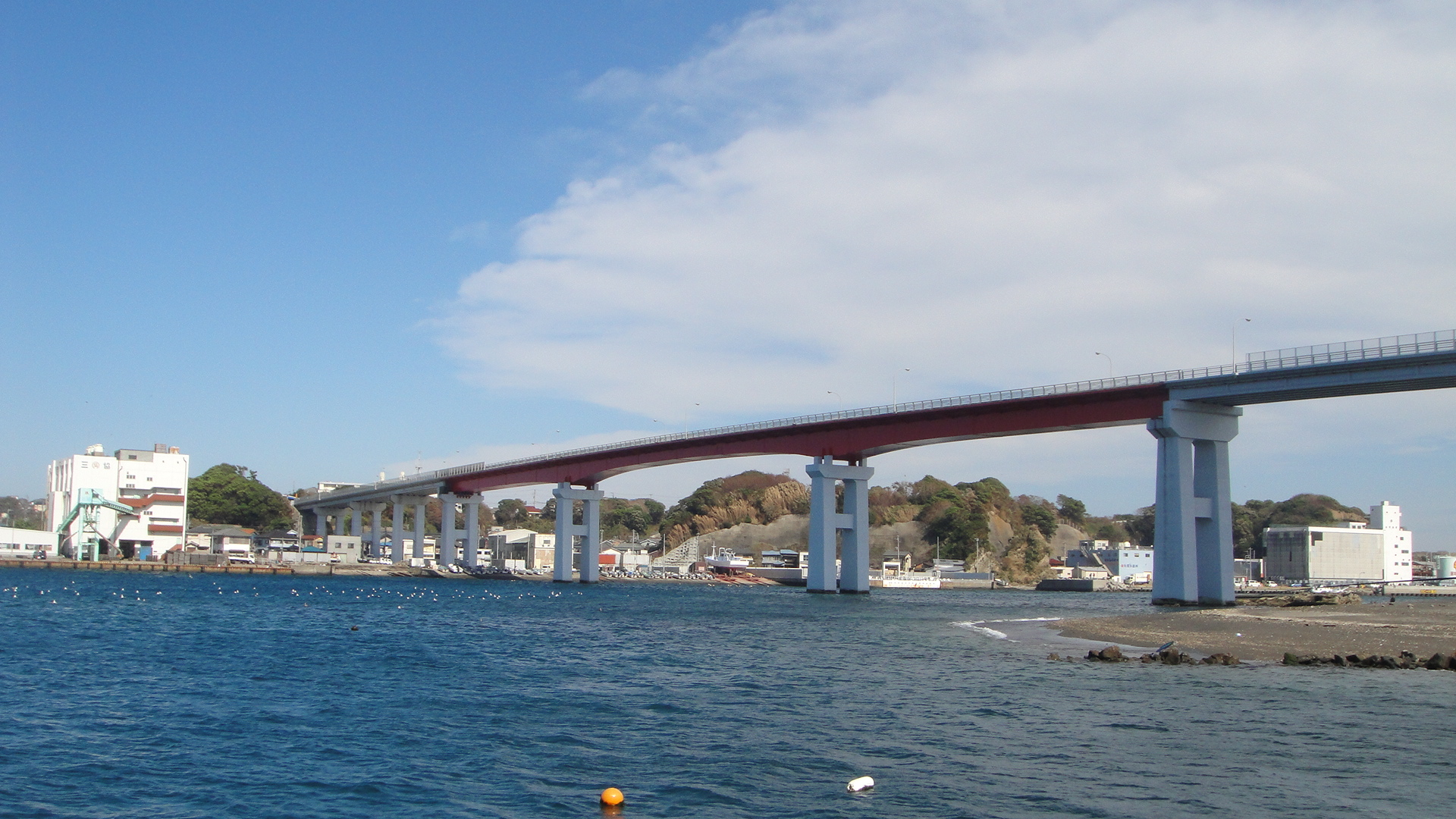
A view of Jogashima bridge

Miura (三浦市, Miura-shi) is a city located in Kanagawa Prefecture, Japan.

As of April 1, 2017, the city had an estimated population of 44,132, with 17,473 households, and a population density of 1,400/km^{2} (3,600/sq mi). The total area is 32.05 km^{2} (12.37 sq mi).

== History ==
The area of modern Miura has been inhabited since prehistoric times. Archaeologists have uncovered numerous remains from the Japanese paleolithic, Jōmon and Yayoi periods. From the late Heian period through the end of the Sengoku period, the area was ruled by the Miura clan, until they were annihilated by the rival Hojo clan. The local inlet of Aburatsubo is said to be named for this event.

During the Edo period, it was tenryō territory ruled directly by the Tokugawa shogunate.

After the Meiji Restoration, the town of Misaki within Miura District, Kanagawa was created on April 1, 1889. The town was electrified in 1913, but did not have running water until 1934.

The area was badly shaken during the 1923 Great Kantō earthquake, which had its epicenter in Sagami Bay just a few kilometers offshore from the city. The whole geographical area around the city was lifted by about 10 meters by tectonic movement, before subsiding to its original level during the next few days. No major tsunami was recorded.

On January 1, 1955, Misaki absorbed neighboring Minami-Shitaura Town and Hasse Village to create the city of Miura. The city was connected to the Tokyo Metropolis by rail on July 7, 1966 with the opening of Miurakaigan Station on the outskirts of the city. The line was extended to Misakiguchi Station on April 26, 1975, but plans to further extend the line to the city center have been abandoned.

Miura came to some infamy in 2001 after the dismembered body of Lucie Blackman was found in a seaside cave a few hundred meters from the apartment of serial rapist, Joji Obara.

Miura has been the arrival point of several trans-Pacific sailboat races, such as the 1969 San Francisco-Tokyo Transpacific Yacht Race. Misaki was also the arrival point of the record solo circumnavigation of 71-year-old Minoru Saito, on June 6, 2005.

== Geography ==
Miura is located on the very southern end of Miura Peninsula in southeast Kanagawa Prefecture, surrounded on three sides by the Pacific Ocean, with Sagami Bay to the west. To the south of the urban area and port is the island of Jōgashima, connected to the city by a bridge. It is a popular destination for weekend tourism. The Jōgashima Lighthouse was built by the French engineer Léonce Verny at the end of the 19th century.

=== Surrounding municipalities ===
- Kanagawa Prefecture
  - Yokosuka

=== Climate ===
Climate data for Miura (1991−2020 normals, extremes 1978−present)
Month	Jan	Feb	Mar	Apr	May	Jun	Jul	Aug	Sep	Oct	Nov	Dec	Year
Record high °C (°F)	18.7 (65.7)	21.8 (71.2)	23.2 (73.8)	26.5 (79.7)	29.6 (85.3)	32.8 (91.0)	36.4 (97.5)	36.3 (97.3)	35.9 (96.6)	30.5 (86.9)	25.0 (77.0)	22.6 (72.7)	36.4 (97.5)
Mean daily maximum °C (°F)	10.6 (51.1)	11.2 (52.2)	14.0 (57.2)	18.5 (65.3)	22.4 (72.3)	24.9 (76.8)	28.5 (83.3)	30.6 (87.1)	27.4 (81.3)	22.2 (72.0)	17.4 (63.3)	13.0 (55.4)	20.1 (68.1)
Daily mean °C (°F)	6.6 (43.9)	7.0 (44.6)	9.9 (49.8)	14.3 (57.7)	18.4 (65.1)	21.3 (70.3)	24.8 (76.6)	26.5 (79.7)	23.6 (74.5)	18.5 (65.3)	13.7 (56.7)	9.1 (48.4)	16.1 (61.1)
Mean daily minimum °C (°F)	2.7 (36.9)	3.0 (37.4)	5.8 (42.4)	10.4 (50.7)	14.9 (58.8)	18.5 (65.3)	22.2 (72.0)	23.8 (74.8)	20.7 (69.3)	15.4 (59.7)	10.2 (50.4)	5.3 (41.5)	12.7 (54.9)
Record low °C (°F)	−3.8 (25.2)	−3.6 (25.5)	−1.8 (28.8)	−0.2 (31.6)	7.2 (45.0)	11.8 (53.2)	14.8 (58.6)	17.1 (62.8)	11.8 (53.2)	6.2 (43.2)	0.5 (32.9)	−1.7 (28.9)	−3.8 (25.2)
Average precipitation mm (inches)	61.3 (2.41)	68.1 (2.68)	129.0 (5.08)	132.1 (5.20)	139.4 (5.49)	179.6 (7.07)	166.4 (6.55)	102.8 (4.05)	205.5 (8.09)	211.4 (8.32)	110.5 (4.35)	67.9 (2.67)	1,573.9 (61.96)
Average precipitation days (≥ 1.0 mm)	5.9	6.4	10.5	10.5	10.3	11.4	9.4	6.5	10.9	11.0	8.3	6.3	107.4
Mean monthly sunshine hours	192.4	173.1	178.4	194.0	197.2	143.5	184.5	234.4	161.5	149.4	158.8	180.0	2,147.3
Source: Japan Meteorological Agency

== Demographics ==
Per Japanese census data, the population of Miura peaked in the 1990s and has declined since.

Historical population
Year	Pop.	±%
1920	20,780	—
1930	22,781	+9.6%
1940	25,815	+13.3%
1950	32,425	+25.6%
1960	39,811	+22.8%
1970	45,532	+14.4%
1980	48,687	+6.9%
1990	52,440	+7.7%
2000	52,253	−0.4%
2010	48,352	−7.5%
2020	42,069	−13.0%

== Economy ==
The economy of the city is dominated by commercial fishing, centered on the harbor of Misaki, Japan's 18th most important fishing harbor, and the 2nd for its catch of tuna, which the local mascot of Miura Tunanosuke is named and designed after. Misaki is an important fishing harbor, mainly specializing in the processing of tuna. The harbor also has a quay which can accommodate sailboats from neighboring marinas.

Agriculture remains important to the local economy, especially watermelon and daikon.

== Transportation ==
=== Railway ===
- Keikyū Kurihama Line
  - Miurakaigan – Misakiguchi

=== Highway ===
- Japan National Route 134

== Education ==
Miura is home to Misaki Fisheries High School, a specialist fishery high school. The school trains students in one of four commercial fisheries skills: radio communications, engineering, food processing, and ocean fishing. The school maintains two fishing vessels, one of which is the ocean-going tuna fishing ship Shōnan Maru, launched in 2005. The Shōnan Maru is a frequent visitor to the port of Honolulu as part of the training programme.

== Local events ==
Miura is well known for the Miura Marathon which is normally held in the first week of March. The race consists of three events: 5 kilometer, 10 kilometer, and a half marathon.

== Sister cities ==
- Suzaka, Nagano, Japan
- Warrnambool, Victoria, Australia
