= Miura District =

District in Kanagawa prefecture, Japan

Coordinates: 35°16′02″N 139°36′14″E

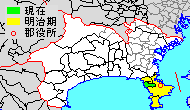
Map of Miura District with Meiji period area in yellow, modern area in green 1 - Hayama

Miura District (三浦郡, Miura-gun) is a district located in Kanagawa Prefecture, Japan.

As of 2009, the district has an estimated population of 32,333 and a density of 1,900 persons per km^{2}. The total area is 17.06 km^{2}.

It currently consists of only one town, Hayama. The cities of Yokosuka, Zushi and Miura were formerly part of Miura District.

== Towns and villages ==
- Hayama

== History ==
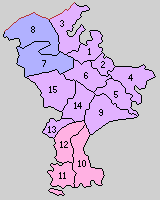
Historic Map of Miura District

Miura District was one of the ancient subdivisions of Sagami Province, covering all of Miura Peninsula. It was under the control of the Miura clan from the late Heian period through the Sengoku period, and was held as tenryō territory administered by the shōgun under the Tokugawa shogunate of the Edo period. After the Meiji Restoration, it was established as a district under the cadastral reform of 1878, with a district office built near what is now Shioiri Station.

=== Timeline ===
- On April 1, 1889, Miura District was divided into the following municipalities under the Meiji :
  - three towns (Yokosuka, Uraga and Misaki)
  - 12 villages (Toyoshima, Kinugasa, Urago, Kurihama, Nagai, Takeyama, Kitashitaura, Nakanishiura, Tagoe, Hayama, Minamishitaura and Hasse).
- On October 1, 1903, Toyoshima Village was promoted town status, but was absorbed into the town of Yokosuka on December 15, 1906 (which Yokosuka was promoted city status on February 15, 1907).
- On July 1, 1911, Nakanishiura Village was renamed as the village of Nishiura.
- On June 1, 1914, Urago Village was promoted town status and was renamed as the town of Taura.
- On April 1, 1924, Tagoe Village was promoted town status and was renamed as the town of Zushi.
- On January 1, 1925, Hayama Village was promoted town status.
- On February 2, 1925, Nagai Village was promoted town status.
- On February 15, 1933, Kinugasa Village was absorbed into the city of Yokosuka.
- On April 1, 1933, Taura Town was absorbed into the city of Yokosuka.
- On July 1, 1935, Nishiura Village was promoted town status and was renamed as the town of Okusu.
- On April 1, 1937, Kuriham Village was absorbed into the city of Yokosuka.
- On April 1, 1940, Minamishtaura Village was promoted town status.
- However, in 1943, Yokosuka expanded greatly by absorbing the towns of Uraga, Zushi, Nagai and Okusu and the two neighboring villages of Takeyama and Kitashitaura.
- On July 1, 1950, Zushi was separated from Yokosuka (becoming an independent municipality once again; which was promoted city status on July 1, 1954).
- On January 1, 1955, Minamishitaura Town, Misaki Town and Hasse Village merged to form the city of Miura.

As of 2009, this leaves only the town of Hayama as the sole remaining portion of Miura District.

=== Merger table ===
before 1889	April 1, 1889	1889 - 1926		1926 - 1944		1945 - 1954		1955 - 1989	1989–present	present
	Yokosuka Town	February 15, 1907; Yokosuka City		Yokosuka City		Yokosuka City		Yokosuka City	Yokosuka City	Yokosuka City
	Toyoshima Village	October 1, 1903; Toyoshima Town	December 15, 1906 merged with Yokosuka town	Yokosuka City		Yokosuka City		Yokosuka City	Yokosuka City	Yokosuka City
	Kinugasa Village	Kinugasa Village		February 15, 1933 merged with Yokosuka City		Yokosuka City		Yokosuka City	Yokosuka City	Yokosuka City
	Urago Village	June 1, 1914; Taura Town		April 1, 1933 merged with Yokosuka City		Yokosuka City		Yokosuka City	Yokosuka City	Yokosuka City
	Kurihama Village	Kurihama Village		April 1, 1937 merged with Yokosuka City		Yokosuka City		Yokosuka City	Yokosuka City	Yokosuka City
	Uraga Town	Uraga Town		April 1, 1943 merged with Yokosuka City		Yokosuka City		Yokosuka City	Yokosuka City	Yokosuka City
	Nagai Village	February 2, 1925; Nagai Town		April 1, 1943 merged with Yokosuka City		Yokosuka City		Yokosuka City	Yokosuka City	Yokosuka City
	Takeyama Village	Takeyama Village		April 1, 1943 merged with Yokosuka City		Yokosuka City		Yokosuka City	Yokosuka City	Yokosuka City
	Kitashitaura Village	Kitashitaura Village		April 1, 1943 merged with Yokosuka City		Yokosuka City		Yokosuka City	Yokosuka City	Yokosuka City
	Nakanishiura Village	July 1, 1911; Nishiura Village		July 1, 1935; Okusu Village	April 1, 1943 merged with Yokosuka City	Yokosuka City		Yokosuka City	Yokosuka City	Yokosuka City
	Tagoe Village	April 1, 1924; Zushi Town		April 1, 1943 merged with Yokosuka City		July 1, 1950; Zushi Town	April 1, 1954; Zushi City	Zushi City	Zushi City	Zushi City
	Hayama Village	January 1, 1925; Hayama Town		Hayama Town		Hayama Town		Hayama Town	Hayama Town	Hayama Town
	Misaki Town	Misaki Town		Misaki Town		Misaki Town		January 1, 1955; Miura City	Miura City	
	Minamishitaura Village	Minamishitaura Village		April 1, 1940; Minamishitaura Town		Minamishitaura Town		January 1, 1955; Miura City	Miura City	
	Hasse Village	Hasse Village		Hasse Village		Hasse Village		January 1, 1955; Miura City	Miura City	
