= Keikyū Kurihama Line =

Railway line in Kanagawa Prefecture, Japan

Keikyu Kurihama Line

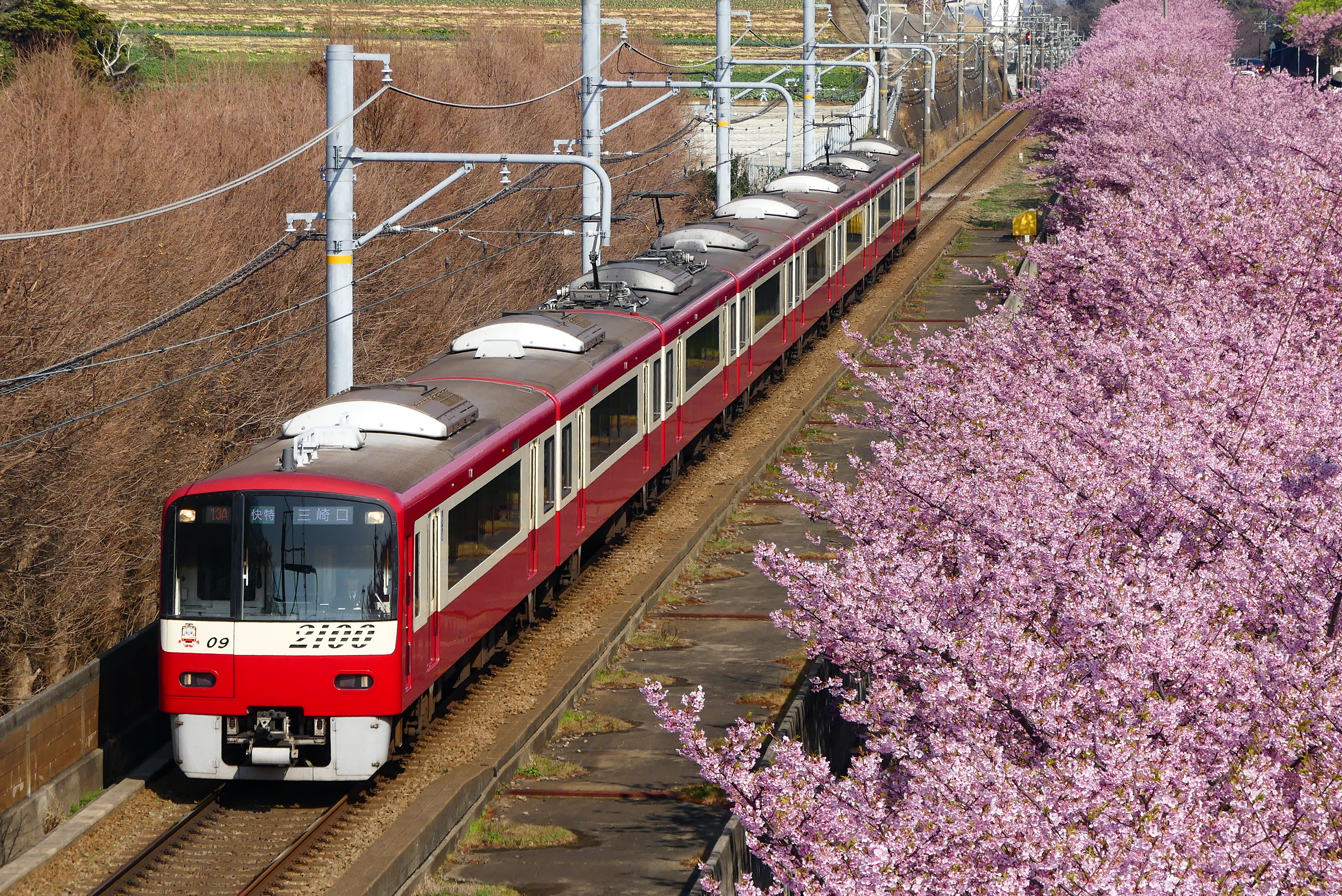
- A Keikyu 2100 series EMU between Miurakaigan and Misakiguchi stations

Overview
- Native name: 京急久里浜線
- Owner: Keikyu
- Locale: Yokosuka and Miura cities, Kanagawa Prefecture
- Termini: Horinouchi; Misakiguchi
- Stations: 9

History
- Opened: 1 December 1942; 83 years ago

Technical
- Line length: 13.4 km (8.3 mi)
- Track gauge: 1,435 mm (4 ft 8 1/2 in) standard gauge
- Electrification: Overhead line, 1,500 V DC
- Operating speed: 110 km/h (70 mph)
- Signalling: Automatic closed block
- Train protection system: C-ATS

The Keikyū Kurihama Line (Japanese: 京急久里浜線, Hepburn: Keikyū Kurihamasen) is a 13.4-kilometre (8.3 mi) private railway line operated by Keikyū in Japan. Keikyu Main Line trains from Oshiage and Shinagawa in Tokyo connect to the Miura Peninsula on the Keikyū Kurihama Line.

== Service types ==
Three different types of service operate on the line, including all-stations "Local" trains, with through-running to and from the Keikyū Main Line. All services except Morning Wing services stop at all stations within the Keikyū Kurihama Line.

Abbreviations

- Lo – Local: (Note: 普通, Futsū) Stops at all stations up to Keikyū Kurihama
- TLE – Tokkyū Limited Express
- KLE – Kaitoku Limited Express
- EW – Evening Wing: (Note: イブニング・ウィング号, Ibuningu Uingu-gō) A Home Liner service with reserved seating and a surcharge, operating on weekday evenings from Shinagawa to Horinouchi on the Main Line, then to Misakiguchi on the Kurihama Line.
- MW – Morning Wing: (Note: モーニング・ウィング号, Mōningu Uingu-gō) A Home Liner service with reserved seating and a surcharge, operating on weekday mornings from Miurakaigan to Sengakuji via the Main Line. Trains bypass major interchange stations Kanazawa-hakkei, Yokohama, and Keikyū Kamata.

== Stations ==
All stations are located in Kanagawa Prefecture.

No.	Name	Distance in km (mi) from		Local	Tokkyū Ltd. Exp.	Kaitoku Ltd. Exp.	Evening Wing	Morning Wing	Transfers	Location
No.	Name	Horinouchi	Shinagawa	Local	Tokkyū Ltd. Exp.	Kaitoku Ltd. Exp.	Evening Wing	Morning Wing	Transfers	Location
Continues to/from Keikyu Main Line, through service to Sengakuji Station.
KK61	Horinouchi 堀ノ内	0.0 (0)	52.3 (32.5)	●	●	●	↑	●	Main Line (through service)	Yokosuka
KK65	Shin-ōtsu 新大津	0.8 (0.50)	53.1 (33.0)	●	●	●	↑	●		Yokosuka
KK66	Kitakurihama 北久里浜	1.7 (1.1)	54.0 (33.6)	●	●	●	↑	●		Yokosuka
KK67	Keikyū Kurihama 京急久里浜	4.5 (2.8)	56.8 (35.3)	●	●	●	↑	●	Yokosuka Line (Kurihama: JO01)	Yokosuka
KK68	YRP Nobi; YRP野比	7.2 (4.5)	59.5 (37.0)		●	●	↑	●		Yokosuka
KK69	Keikyū Nagasawa 京急長沢	8.5 (5.3)	60.8 (37.8)		●	●	↑	●		Yokosuka
KK70	Tsukuihama 津久井浜	9.7 (6.0)	62.0 (38.5)		●	●	↑	●		Yokosuka
KK71	Miurakaigan 三浦海岸	11.2 (7.0)	63.5 (39.5)		●	●	●	●		Miura
KK72	Misakiguchi 三崎口	13.4 (8.3)	65.7 (40.8)		●	●		●		Miura

== History ==
The section from Horinouchi to Kurihama (present-day Keikyu Kurihama) opened on 1 December 1942. The line was extended to Nobi on 1 November 1963, and the Keikyu factory at Kurihama opened at the same time. The line was further extended to Tsukuihama on 27 March 1966, and to Miurakaigan on 7 July 1966.

Direct limited express services between Miurakaigan and Keisei Narita began on 31 December 1969. ATS signalling was introduced on all Keikyu Lines on 12 November 1970. The final section from Miurakaigan to Misakiguchi opened on 26 April 1975.

From the start of the revised weekday timetable on 7 December 2015, two Morning Wing limited-stop commuter services from Miurakaigan to Shinagawa and Sengakuji in Tokyo were introduced. These stop at Yokosuka-chuo, Kanazawa-Bunko, and Kamiōoka en route.

== See also ==
- List of railway lines in Japan
