= Keikyū Kurihama Station =

Railway station in Yokosuka, Kanagawa Prefecture, Japan

KK67 Keikyū Kurihama Station 京急久里浜駅
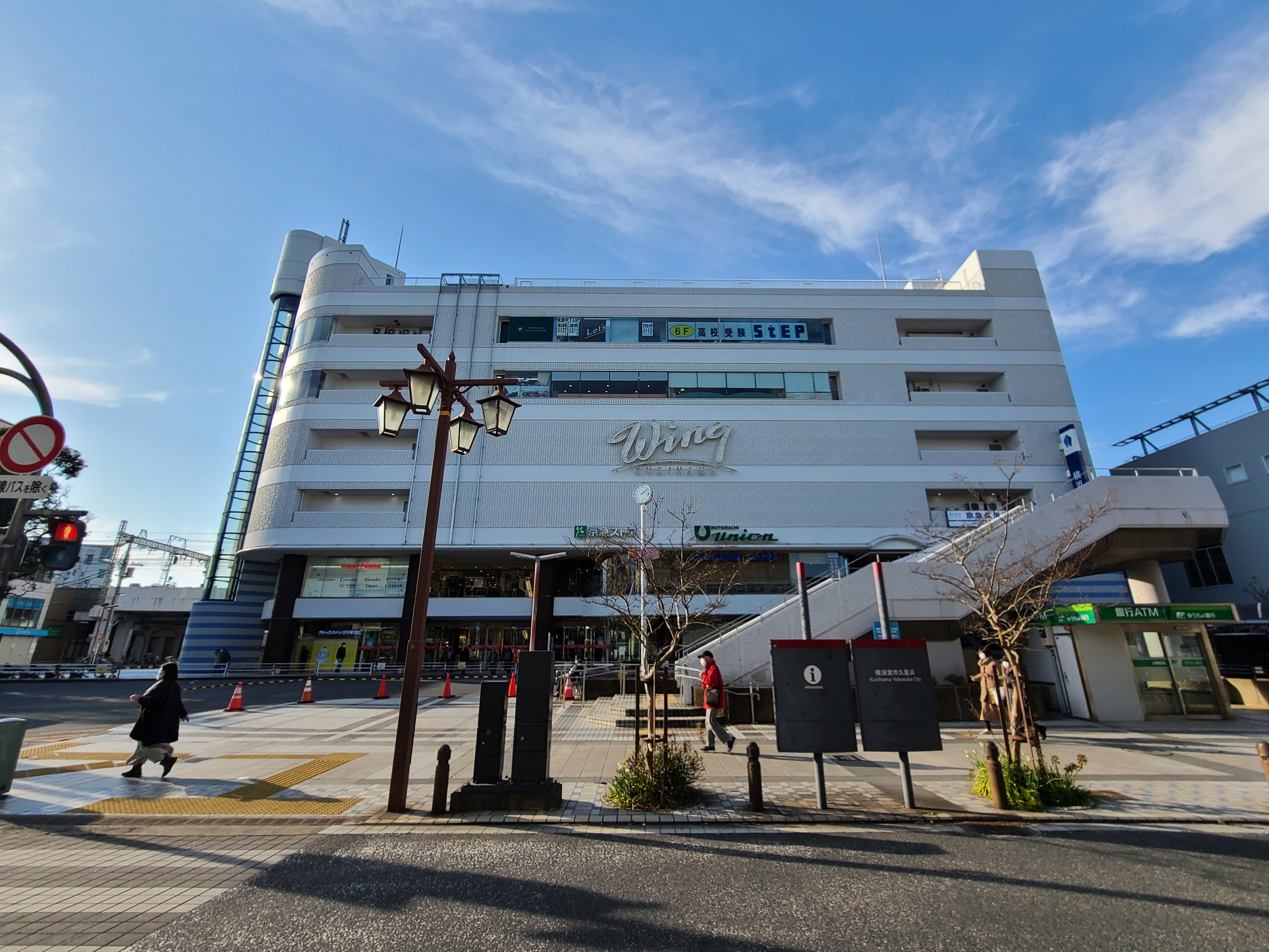
- Keikyū Kurihama Station, January 2021

General information
- Location: Kurihama 4-4-10, Yokosuka-shi, Kanagawa-ken 239-0831; Japan
- Coordinates: 35.2313181°N 139.7020197°E
- Operator: Keikyū
- Line: Keikyū Kurihama Line
- Distance: 56.8 km from Shinagawa
- Platforms: 2 island platforms
- Connections: Bus stop

Construction
- Accessible: Yes

Other information
- Station code: KK67
- Website: Official website (in Japanese)

History
- Opened: December 1, 1942
- Former names: Keihin Kurihama; Shōnan-Kurihama (until 1987)

Passengers
- FY2019: 42,350 daily

Services
Preceding station	Keikyu	Following station
YRP Nobi KK68 towards Misakiguchi	Evening Wing	Kitakurihama One-way operation
YRP Nobi KK68 towards Misakiguchi	Kurihama Line Limited Express (Kaitoku) Limited Express (Tokkyū)	Kitakurihama KK66 towards Horinouchi
Terminus	Kurihama Line Local	Kitakurihama KK66 towards Horinouchi
Location
- Location within Kanagawa Prefecture Location within Japan

Keikyū Kurihama Station (京急久里浜駅, Keikyū Kurihama-eki) is a passenger railway station located in the city of Yokosuka, Kanagawa Prefecture, Japan, operated by the private railway company Keikyū.

== Lines ==
Keikyū Kurihama Station is served by the Keikyū Kurihama Line and is located 4.5 rail kilometers from the junction at Horinouchi Station, and 56.8 km from the starting point of the Keikyū Main Line at Shinagawa Station in Tokyo.

== Station layout ==
The station consists of two elevated island platforms serving four tracks. Platform 2 is primarily used for services terminating at Keikyū Kurihama Station.

=== Platforms ===
1, 2	■ Keikyū Kurihama Line	for Miurakaigan and Misakiguchi
3, 4	■ Keikyū Kurihama Line	for Horinouchi; Keikyū Main Line for Yokohama, Shinagawa, and Sengakuji; Keikyū Airport Line for Haneda Airport Terminal 1·2; Toei Asakusa Line for Shimbashi and Oshiage; Keisei Oshiage Line for Aoto; Keisei Main Line for Keisei Funabashi and Narita Airport; Hokuso Line for Shin-Kamagaya and Inba-Nihon-Idai; Narita Sky Access Line for Narita Airport

== History ==
Keikyū Kurihama Station opened on December 1, 1942, as the southern terminal station for the Tokyu Shōnan Line. At that time, it was named simply Kurihama Station (久里浜駅, Kurihama-eki), however, to avoid confusion with the neighboring government-run Kurihama Station, it was renamed Shōnan-Kurihama Station (湘南久里浜駅, Shōnan-Kurihama-eki) on April 1, 1944. It became a station on the Keihin Electric Express Railway from 1948. The station was renamed Keihin Kurihama Station (京浜久里浜駅, Keihin Kurihama-eki), on November 1, 1963. A new station building was completed in April 1987, and the station renamed to its present name on June 1, 1987.

Keikyū introduced station numbering to its stations on 21 October 2010; Keikyū Kurihama Station was assigned station number KK67.

== Passenger statistics ==
In fiscal 2019, the station was used by an average of 42,350 passengers daily.

The passenger figures for previous years are as shown below.

Fiscal year	daily average
2005	44,017
2010	44,158
2015	43,608

== Surrounding area ==
- Kurihama Station ( Yokosuka Line)
- Kurihama shopping district
- Perry Park

== See also ==
- List of railway stations in Japan
