= Horinouchi Station =

Railway station in Yokosuka, Kanagawa Prefecture, Japan

Coordinates: 35°15′48.77″N 139°41′12.22″E

KK61 Horinouchi Station 堀ノ内駅
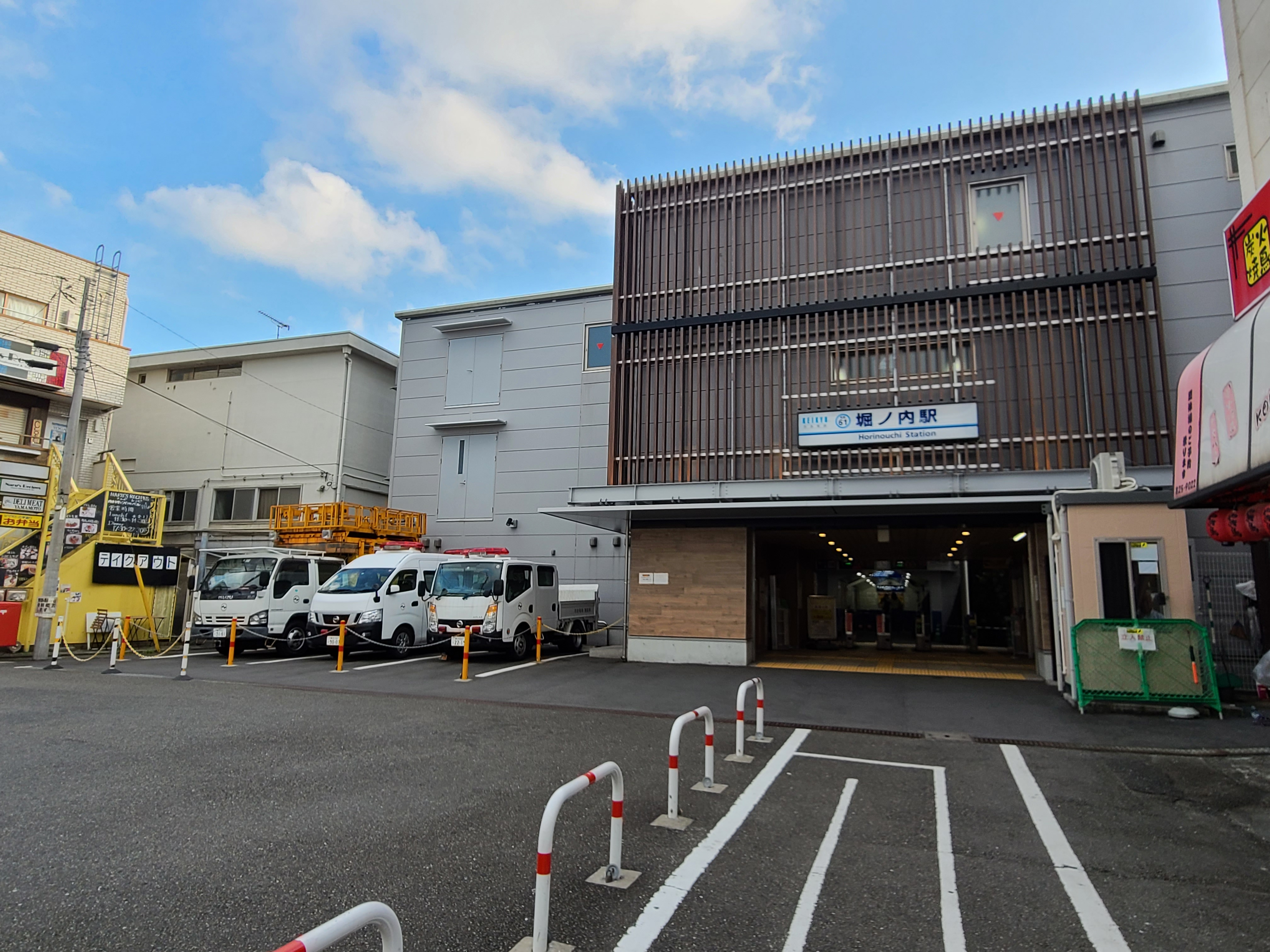
- Station building in August 2020

General information
- Location: 3-4 Miharu-cho, Yokosuka-shi, Kanagawa-ken 238-0014; Japan
- Operator: Keikyū
- Lines: Keikyū Main Line; Keikyū Kurihama Line
- Distance: 52.3 km from Shinagawa
- Platforms: 2 island platforms

Construction
- Accessible: Yes

Other information
- Station code: KK61
- Website: Official website

History
- Opened: April 1, 1930
- Former names: Yokosuka-Horinouchi (until 1961)

Passengers
- 2019: 12,254 daily

Services
Preceding station	Keikyu	Following station
Shin-Ōtsu KK65 towards Misakiguchi	Evening Wing	Yokosuka-chūō One-way operation
through to Kurihama Line	Main Line Limited Express (Kaitoku)	Yokosuka-chūō KK59 towards Sengakuji
Keikyū Ōtsu KK62 towards Uraga	Main Line Limited Express (Tokkyū)	Yokosuka-chūō KK59 towards Sengakuji
Keikyū Ōtsu KK62 towards Uraga	Main Line Local	Kenritsudaigaku KK60 towards Shinagawa
Shin-Ōtsu KK65 towards Misakiguchi	Kurihama Line Limited Express (Kaitoku) Limited Express (Tokkyū)	through to Main Line
Shin-Ōtsu KK65 towards Keikyū Kurihama	Kurihama Line Local	through to Main Line
Location
- Location within Kanagawa Prefecture Location within Japan

Horinouchi Station (堀ノ内駅, Horinouchi-eki) is a junction passenger railway station located in the city of Yokosuka, Kanagawa, Japan, operated by the private railway operator Keikyū.

== Lines ==
Horinouchi is served by the Keikyū Main Line and Keikyū Kurihama Line. It is located 52.3 rail kilometers from the northern starting point of the Keikyū Main Line at Shinagawa Station, in Tokyo and is the starting station for the Keikyū Kurihama Line.

== Station layout ==
The station consists of two elevated island platforms serving four tracks, connected to the station building by an underpass.

=== Platforms ===
1, 2	■ Keikyū Main Line	for Uraga
2	■ Keikyū Kurihama Line	for Keikyū Kurihama and Misakiguchi
3, 4	■ Keikyū Main Line	for Yokohama, Keikyū Kamata, Shinagawa, and Sengakuji; Keikyū Airport Line for Haneda Airport Terminal 1·2; Toei Asakusa Line for Shimbashi and Oshiage; Keisei Oshiage Line for Aoto; Keisei Main Line for Keisei Funabashi and Narita Airport; Hokuso Line for Shin-Kamagaya and Inba-Nihon-Idai; Narita Sky Access Line for Narita Airport

== History ==
The station opened on April 1, 1930 as a temporary stop on the Shōnan Electric Railways. At that time, it was named Yokosuka-Horinouchi Provisional Station (横須賀堀内仮駅), and was located 200 meters closer to Yokosuka-Chūō Station than the present station. In June 1936, it was elevated in status to a full station. In November 1941, the Shōnan Electric Railways and the Keihin Electric Railways merged, and in May 1942 became part of the Tokyu Corporation. The station was relocated to its present address in November 1942. In 1948, the Keihin Electric Express Railway became independent of the Tokyu Corporation. The station assumed its present name on September 1, 1961.

Keikyū introduced station numbering to its stations on 21 October 2010; Horinouchi Station was assigned station number KK61.

== Passenger statistics ==
In fiscal 2019, the station was used by an average of 12,254 passengers daily.

The passenger figures for previous years are as shown below.

Fiscal year	daily average
2005	13,122
2010	13,017
2015	12,508

== Surrounding area ==
- Yokosuka Fruit and Vegetable Market
- Kasuga Shrine
- Yokosuka Miharu Post Office
- Yokosuka City Yamazaki Elementary School
- Yokosuka Emergency Medical Center

== See also ==
- List of railway stations in Japan
