= Misakiguchi Station =

Railway station in Miura, Kanagawa Prefecture, Japan

KK72 Misakiguchi Station 三崎口駅
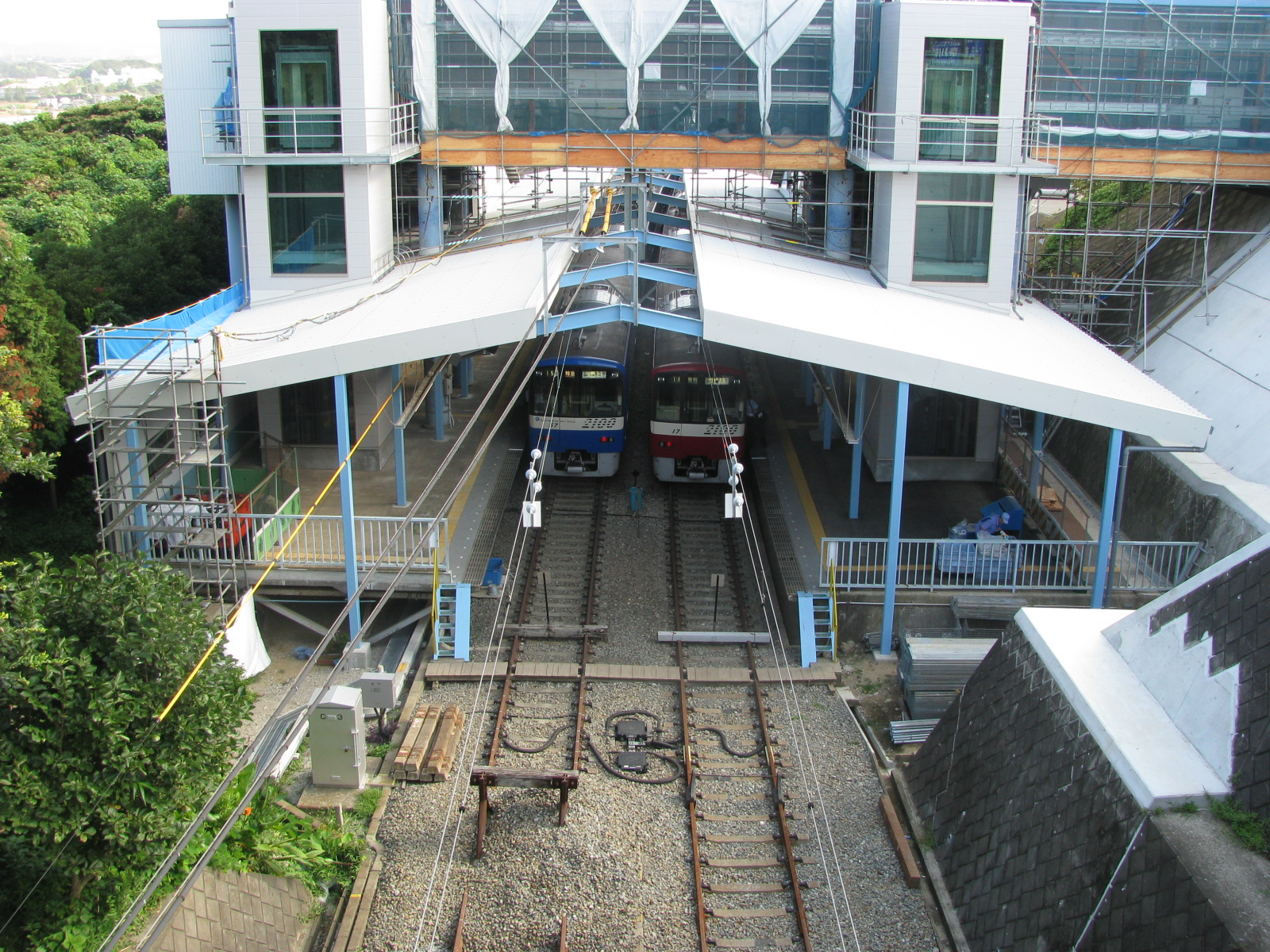
- Misakiguchi Station

General information
- Location: 495 Hatsuse-machi Shimomiyada, Miura-shi, Kanagawa-ken 238-0111; Japan
- Coordinates: 35°10′39″N 139°37′58″E
- Operator: Keikyū
- Line: Keikyū Kurihama Line
- Distance: 65.7 km from Shinagawa
- Platforms: 2 side platforms
- Connections: Bus stop

Construction
- Accessible: Yes

Other information
- Station code: KK72
- Website: Official website (in Japanese)

History
- Opened: 26 April 1975

Passengers
- FY2019: 16,683 daily

Services
Preceding station	Keikyu	Following station
Terminus	Evening Wing	Miurakaigan One-way operation
Terminus	Kurihama Line Limited Express (Kaitoku) Limited Express (Tokkyū)	Miurakaigan KK71 towards Horinouchi
Location
- Location within Kanagawa Prefecture Location within Japan

Misakiguchi Station (三崎口駅, Misakiguchi-eki) is a passenger railway station located in the city of Miura, Kanagawa, Japan, operated by the private railway company Keikyū.

== Lines ==
Misakiguchi Station is the southern terminus of the Keikyū Kurihama Line, and is located 13.4 km from the junction at Horinouchi Station, and 65.7 km from the northern terminus of the Keikyū Main Line at Shinagawa Station in Tokyo.

== Station layout ==
The station consists of two dead-headed side platforms serving two bi-directional tracks. The station building is elevated and located above the tracks and platforms.

=== Platforms ===
1-2	Keikyu Kurihama Line	for Keikyū Kurihama and Horinouchi; Keikyū Main Line for Yokohama, Shinagawa, and Sengakuji; Keikyū Airport Line for Haneda Airport; Toei Asakusa Line for Shimbashi and Oshiage; Keisei Oshiage Line for Aoto; Keisei Main Line for Keisei Funabashi and Narita Airport; Hokuso Line for Shin-Kamagaya and Inba-Nihon-Idai; Narita Sky Access Line for Narita Airport

== History ==
Misakiguchi Station opened on 26 April 1975.

Keikyū introduced station numbering to its stations on 21 October 2010; Misakiguchi Station was assigned station number KK72.

== Passenger statistics ==
In fiscal 2019, the station was used by an average of 16,683 passengers daily.

The passenger figures for previous years are as shown below.

Fiscal year	daily average
2005	20,179
2010	19,131
2015	18,296

== Surrounding area ==
- Keikyu New Town
- Miura City Hall Hasse Branch Office
- Miura City General Gymnasium (Shiokaze Arena)
- Kanagawa Prefectural Agricultural Research Institute Miura Proving Ground

== See also ==
- List of railway stations in Japan
