= Oppama Station =

Railway station in Yokosuka, Kanagawa Prefecture, Japan

KK54 Oppama Station 追浜駅
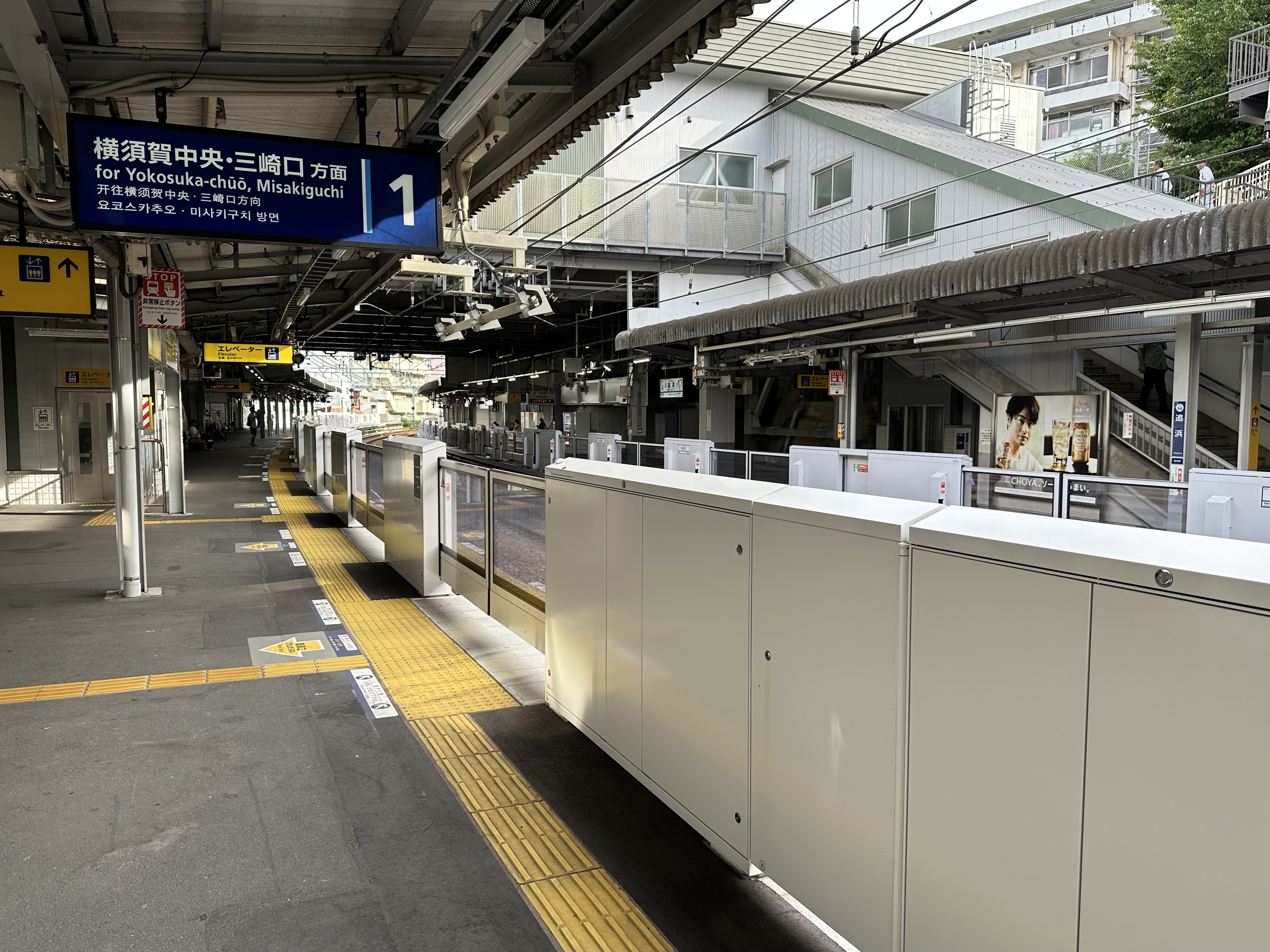
- Station platforms, July 2023

General information
- Location: 3-3 Oppama-cho, Yokosuka-shi, Kanagawa-ken 237-0064; Japan
- Coordinates: 35.315812°N 139.624847°E
- Operator: Keikyū
- Line: Keikyū Main Line
- Distance: 42.8 km from Shinagawa
- Platforms: 2 side platforms
- Connections: Bus stop

Other information
- Station code: KK54
- Website: Official website

History
- Opened: April 1, 1930

Passengers
- 2019: 42,286 daily

Services
Preceding station	Keikyu	Following station
Shioiri KK58 towards Uraga	Main Line Limited Express (Tokkyū)	Kanazawa-hakkei KK50 towards Sengakuji
Keikyū Taura KK55 towards Uraga	Main Line Local	Kanazawa-hakkei KK50 towards Sengakuji
Location
- Location within Kanagawa Prefecture Location within Japan

Oppama Station (追浜駅, Oppama-eki) is a passenger railway station located in the city of Yokosuka, Kanagawa Prefecture, Japan, operated by the private railway company Keikyū.

== Lines ==
Oppama Station is served by the Keikyū Main Line and is located 42.8 kilometers from the northern terminus of the line at Shinagawa Station in Tokyo.

== Station layout ==
The station consists of two opposed elevated side platforms by a footbridge with the station building underneath.

Platform screen doors were installed in January 2022.

=== Platforms ===
1	■ Keikyū Main Line	for Yokosuka-chūō, Keikyū Kurihama, Misakiguchi, and Uraga
2	■ Keikyū Main Line	for Yokohama, Haneda Airport, Shinagawa, Sengakuji, and Oshiage

== History ==
The station opened on 1 April 1930, as a station on the Shōnan Electric Railway, which merged with the Keihin Electric Railway on 1 November 1941.

Keikyū introduced station numbering to its stations on 21 October 2010; Oppama Station was assigned station number KK54.

== Passenger statistics ==
In fiscal 2019, the station was used by an average of 42,286 passengers daily.

The passenger figures for previous years are as shown below.

Fiscal year	daily average
2005	43,399
2010	40,205
2015	41,160

== Surrounding area ==
- Nissan Motors Oppama Factory
- Sumitomo Heavy Industries Yokosuka shipyard

== See also ==
- List of railway stations in Japan
