= Anjinzuka Station =

Railway station in Yokosuka, Kanagawa Prefecture, Japan

KK56 Anjinzuka Station 安針塚駅
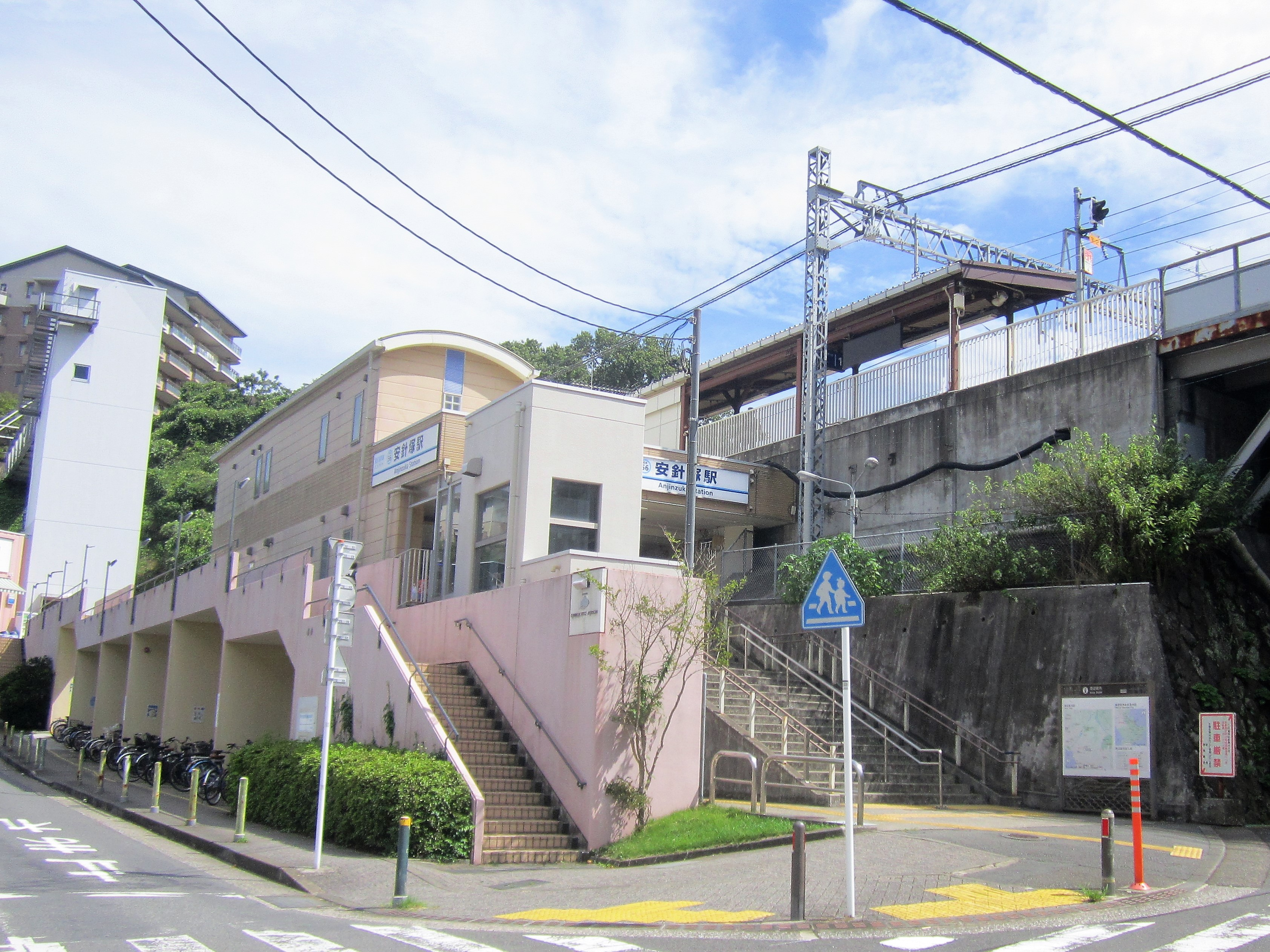
- Anjinzuka Station, August 2019

General information
- Location: 3 Nagaura-cho, Yokosuka-shi, Kanagawa-ken 237-0072; Japan
- Coordinates: 35.2868°N 139.6430°E
- Operator: Keikyū
- Line: Keikyū Main Line
- Distance: 47.2 km from Shinagawa
- Platforms: 2 side platforms
- Connections: Bus stop

Construction
- Accessible: Yes

Other information
- Station code: KK56
- Website: Official website

History
- Opened: April 1, 1930
- Former names: Gunjubumae (until 1940)

Passengers
- FY2019: 4,671 daily

Services
Preceding station	Keikyu	Following station
Hemi KK57 towards Uraga	Main Line Local	Keikyū Taura KK55 towards Shinagawa
Location

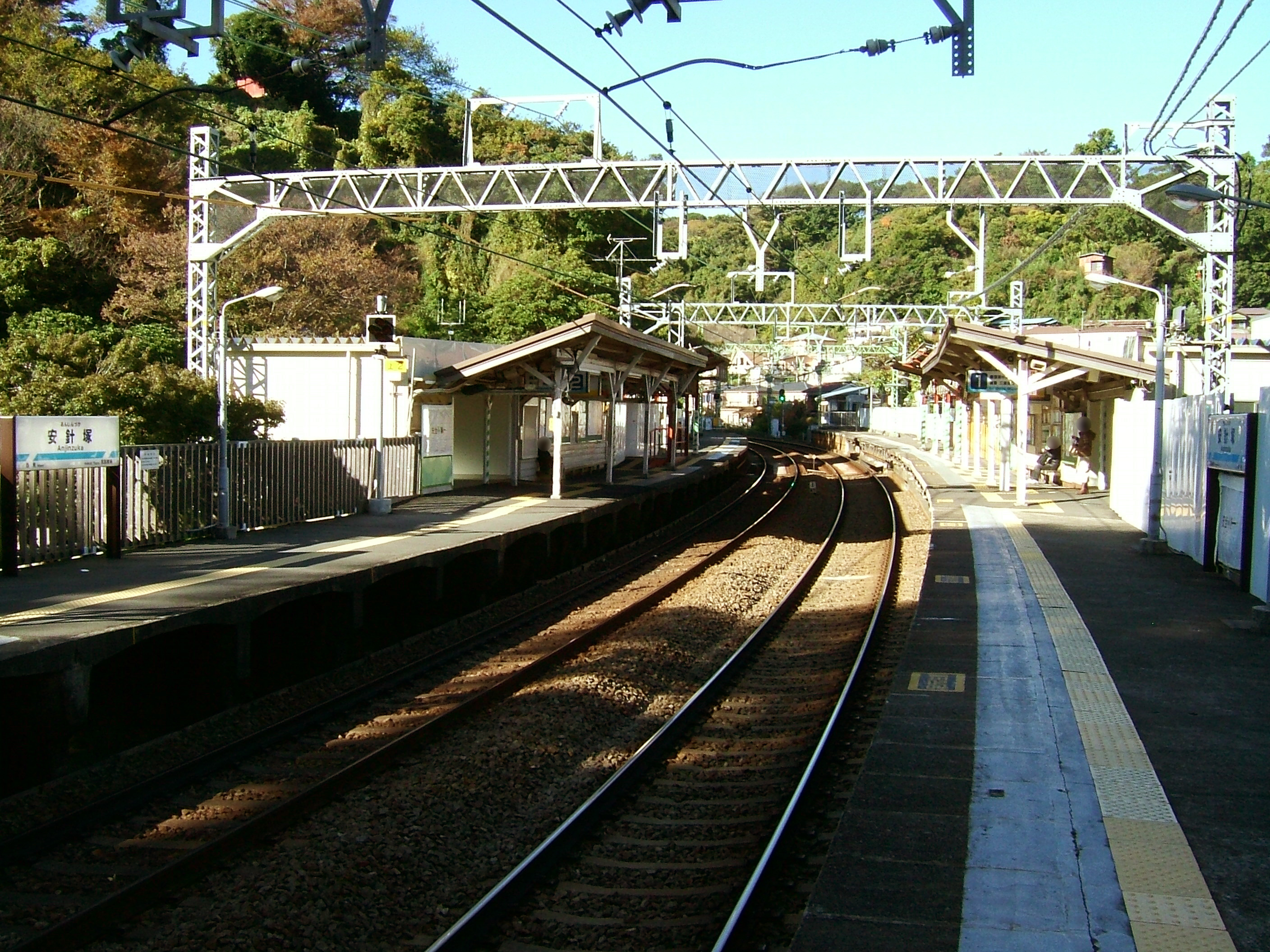
The platforms at Anjinzuka Station

Anjinzuka Station (安針塚駅, Anjinzuka-eki) is a passenger railway station located in the city of Yokosuka, Kanagawa Prefecture, Japan, operated by the private railway company Keikyū.

== Lines ==
Anjinzuka Station is served by the Keikyū Main Line and is located 47.2 kilometers from the northern terminus of the line at Shinagawa Station in Tokyo.

== Station layout ==
The station consists of two opposed elevated side platforms with the station building underneath.

=== Platforms ===
1	■ Keikyū Main Line	for Yokosuka-Chūō, Horinouchi, and Uraga; Keikyū Kurihama Line for Keikyū Kurihama
2	■ Keikyū Main Line	for Yokohama, Keikyū Kamata, and Shinagawa; Keikyū Airport Line for Haneda Airport Terminal 1·2

== History ==
The station opened on October 1, 1934, as Gunjubumae Station (軍需部前駅, Gunjubumae-eki) on the Shōnan Electric Railway, which merged with the Keihin Electric Railway on November 1, 1940. The station was renamed Anjinzuka on October 1, 1940. The station building was rebuilt in 2007.

Keikyū introduced station numbering to its stations on 21 October 2010; Anjinzuka Station was assigned station number KK56.

== Passenger statistics ==
In fiscal 2019, the station was used by an average of 4,671 passengers daily.

The passenger figures for previous years are as shown below.

Fiscal year	daily average
2005	5,094
2010	4,981
2015	4,874

== Surrounding area ==
- Yokosuka City Nagaura Elementary School
- Tomb of William Adams (pilot)

== See also ==
- List of railway stations in Japan
