= Keikyū Taura Station =

Railway station in Yokosuka, Kanagawa Prefecture, Japan

KK55 Keikyū Taura Station 京急田浦駅
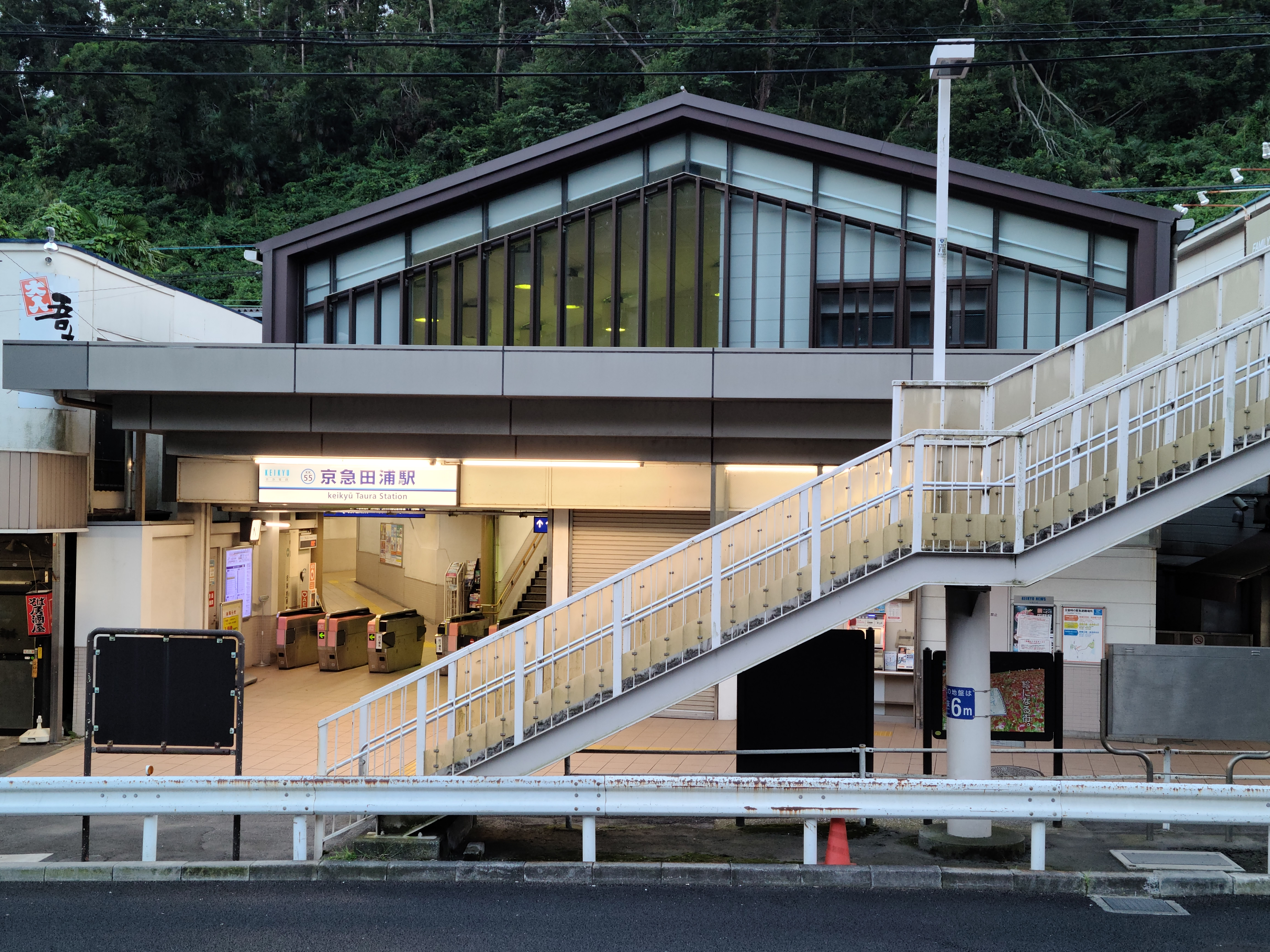
- Keikyu Taura Station, August 2020

General information
- Location: 5-2 Funakoshi-chō, Yokosuka-shi, Kanagawa-ken 237-0076; Japan
- Coordinates: 35.3011°N 139.6254°E
- Operator: Keikyū
- Line: Keikyū Main Line
- Distance: 44.5 km from Shinagawa
- Platforms: 2 side platforms
- Connections: Bus stop

Construction
- Accessible: Yes

Other information
- Station code: KK55
- Website: Official website

History
- Opened: April 1, 1930
- Former names: Shōnan Taura; Keihin Taura (until 1987)

Passengers
- 2019: 12,986 daily

Services
Preceding station	Keikyu	Following station
Anjinzuka KK56 towards Uraga	Main Line Local	Oppama KK54 towards Shinagawa
Location
- Location within Kanagawa Prefecture Location within Japan

Keikyū Taura Station (京急田浦駅, Keikyū Taura-eki) is a passenger railway station located in the city of Yokosuka, Kanagawa Prefecture, Japan, operated by the private railway company Keikyū.

== Lines ==
Keikyū Taura Station is served by the Keikyū Main Line and is located 44.5 kilometers from the northern terminus of the line at Shinagawa Station in Tokyo.

== Station layout ==
The station consists of two elevated opposed side platforms the station underneath. The platforms are short, and can only handle six-car long trains.

=== Platforms ===
1	■ Keikyū Main Line	for Yokosuka-Chūō, Horinouchi, and Uraga; Keikyū Kurihama Line for Keikyū Kurihama
2	■ Keikyū Main Line	for Yokohama, Keikyū Kamata, and Shinagawa; Keikyū Airport Line for Haneda Airport Terminal 1·2

== History ==
The station opened on April 1, 1930 as Shōnan Taura Station (湘南田浦駅). It was renamed Keihin Taura Station (京浜田浦駅) on November 1, 1963, and to its present name on June 1, 1987.

Keikyū introduced station numbering to its stations on 21 October 2010; Keikyū Taura Station was assigned station number KK55.

== Passenger statistics ==
In fiscal 2019, the station was used by an average of 12,986 passengers daily.

The passenger figures for previous years are as shown below.

Fiscal year	daily average
2005	15,064
2010	14,218
2015	13,180

== Surrounding area ==
- Taura Plum Grove
- Nagaura Port
- JMSDF Yokosuka Base
- Yokosuka City Funakoshi Elementary School

== See also ==
- List of railway stations in Japan
