= Hinodechō Station =

Railway station in Yokohama, Japan

KK39 Hinodechō Station 日ノ出町駅
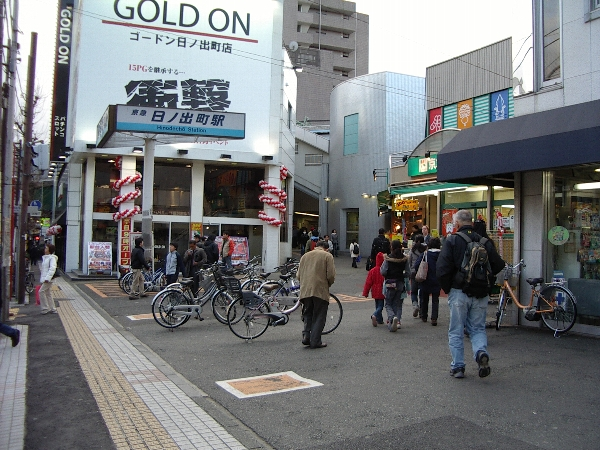
- Hinodechō Station

General information
- Location: 1-chome, Hinodechō, Naka-ku, Yokohama-shi, Kanagawa-ken 231-0066; Japan
- Coordinates: 35.4455°N 139.6266°E
- Operator: Keikyū
- Line: Keikyū Main Line
- Distance: 24.8 km from Shinagawa
- Platforms: 2 side platforms
- Connections: Bus stop

Other information
- Station code: KK39
- Website: Official website

History
- Opened: 26 December 1931

Passengers
- 2019: 28,487 daily

Services
Preceding station	Keikyu	Following station
Idogaya KK42 towards Kanazawa-hakkei	Main Line Express	Yokohama KK37 towards Keikyū Kamata
Koganechō KK40 towards Uraga	Main Line Local	Tobe KK38 towards Shinagawa
Location
- Location within Kanagawa Prefecture Location within Japan

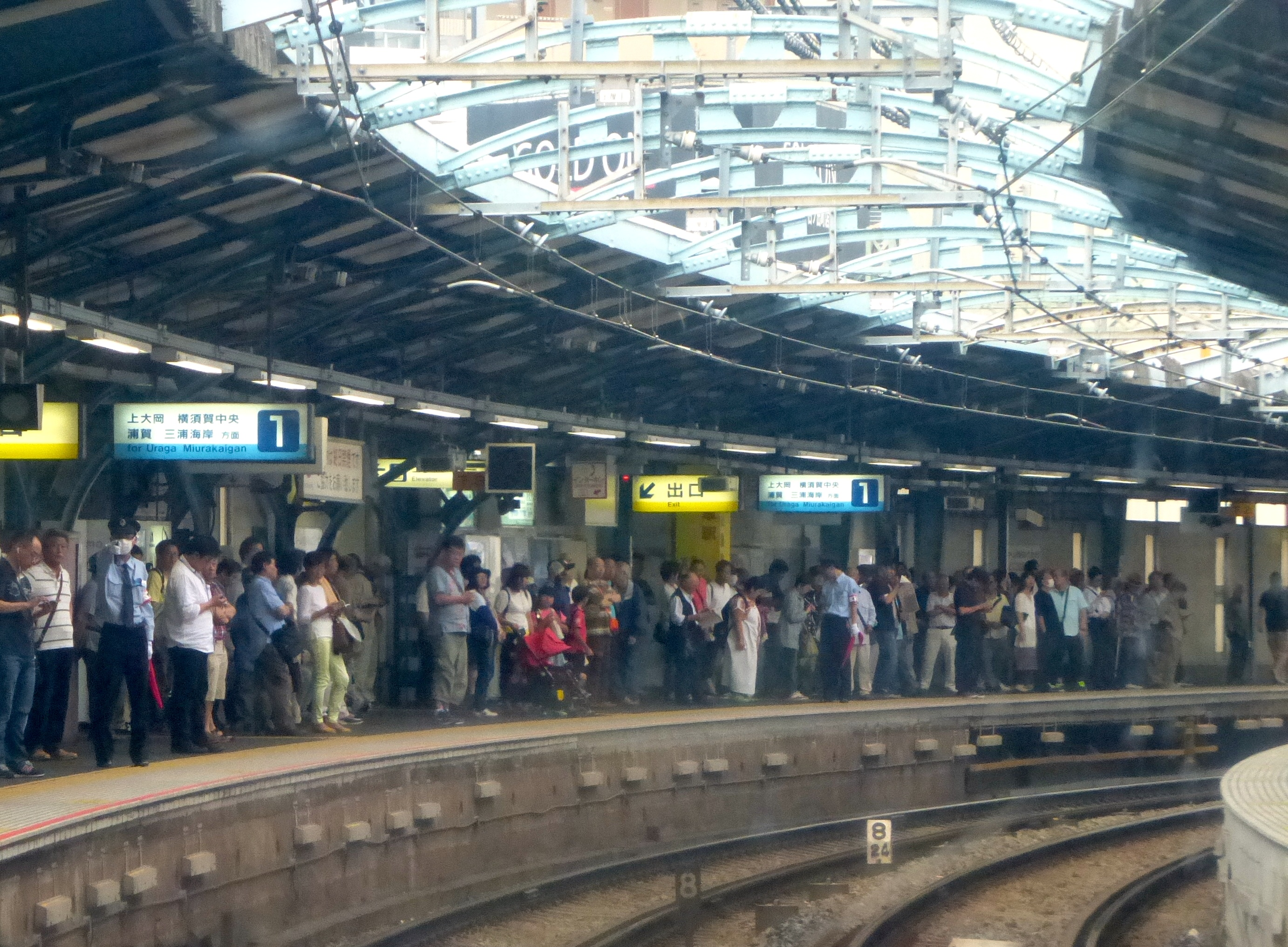
Station platform with a lot of people, June 2015

Hinodechō Station (日ノ出町駅, Hinodechō-eki) is a passenger railway station located in Naka-ku, Yokohama, Kanagawa Prefecture, Japan, operated by the private railway company Keikyū.

== Lines ==
Hinodechō Station is served by the Keikyū Main Line and is located 24.8 kilometers from the terminus of the line at Shinagawa Station in Tokyo.

== Station layout ==
The station consists of two elevated opposed side platforms with the station building underneath.

Platform screen doors will be installed on both platforms over a one-week period from 26 March to 2 April 2022.

=== Platforms ===
1	■ Keikyū Main Line	for Kamiōoka, Zushi·Hayama, Uraga
2	■ Keikyū Main Line	for Yokohama, Haneda Airport Terminal 1·2, Shinagawa, Sengakuji, Oshiage

== History ==
Hinodechō Station was opened on 26 December 1931.

Keikyū introduced station numbering to its stations on 21 October 2010; Hinodechō Station was assigned station number KK39.

== Passenger statistics ==
In fiscal 2019, the station was used by an average of 28,487 passengers daily.

The passenger figures for previous years are as shown below.

Fiscal year	daily average
2005	30,199
2010	27,876
2015	27,629

== Surrounding area ==
- Honcho Elementary School
- Azuma Elementary School
- Oimatsu Junior High School
- Ooka River

== See also ==
- List of railway stations in Japan
