= Kitashinagawa Station =

Railway station in Tokyo, Japan

Coordinates: 35.6222°N 139.7394°E

KK02 Kitashinagawa Station 北品川駅
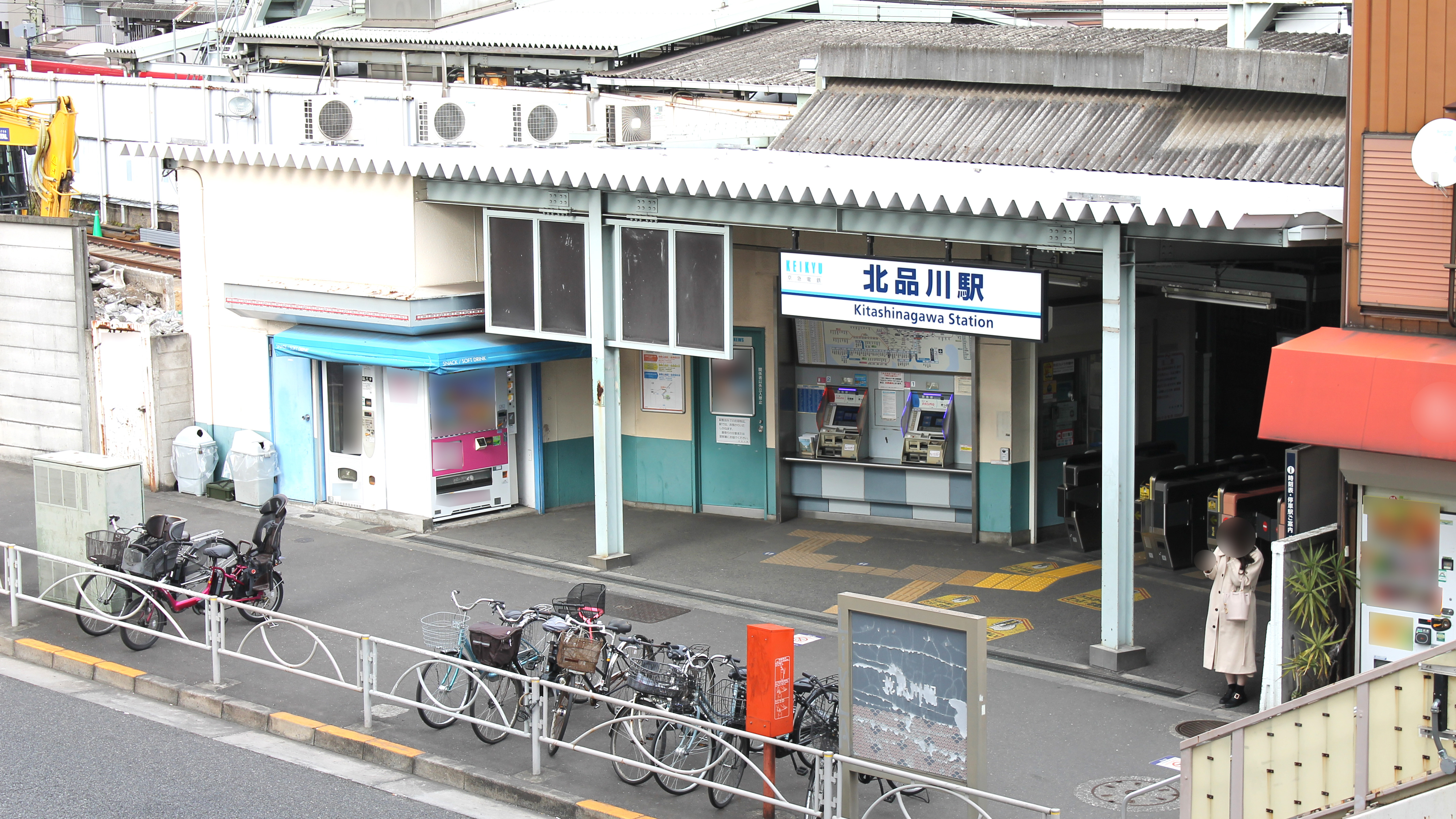
- Station building in March 2022

General information
- Location: Shinagawa, Tokyo; Japan
- Operator: Keikyu
- Line: Keikyū Main Line

Other information
- Station code: KK02

History
- Opened: 8 May 1904; 122 years ago

Services
Preceding station	Keikyu	Following station
Shimbamba KK03 towards Uraga	Main Line Local	Shinagawa KK01 Terminus
Location

Kitashinagawa Station (北品川駅, Kitashinagawa-eki) is a railway station on the Keikyū Main Line in Shinagawa, Tokyo, Japan, operated by Keikyu. It is numbered KK02.

Kitashinagawa Station, meaning "North Shinagawa", is in fact located south of the Shinagawa Station. This is because Kitashinagawa refers to its position in the Shinagawa Ward while the confusingly named Shinagawa Station is in the neighboring Minato Ward.

== Lines ==
Kitashinagawa Station is served by the Keikyū Main Line, and is located 1.9 km from the starting point of the line at Sengakuji.

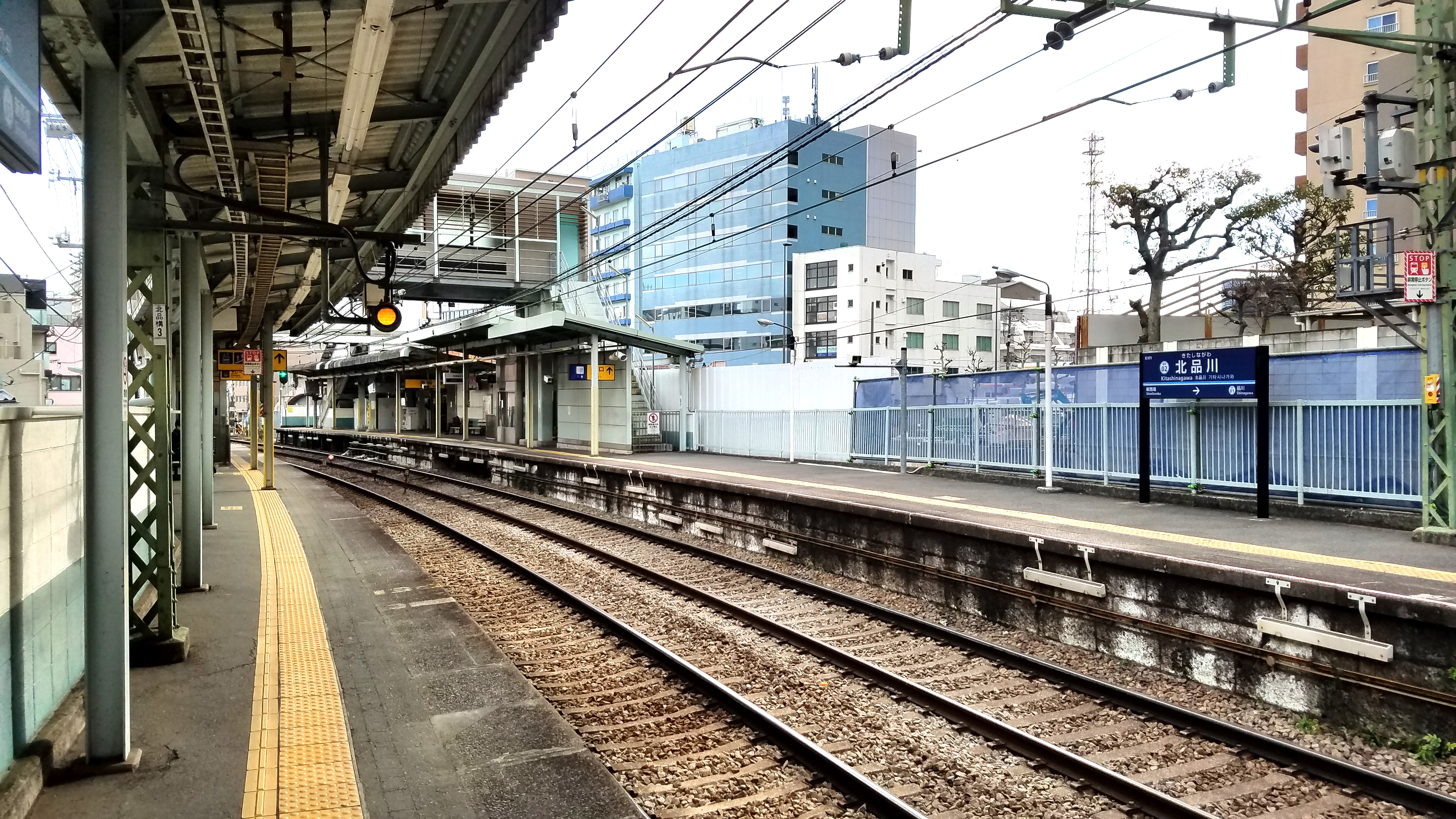
View of the platforms in March 2022

== Layout ==
This station consists of two side platforms serving two tracks. Adjacent to the platforms on the west side is a two track siding, used for storing maintenance equipment. As of November 2025, the maintenance facility has been removed, alongside the rails for the siding and the crossovers

1	Keikyū Main Line	for Keikyū Kamata, Yokohama, and Uraga; Keikyū Zushi Line for Zushi·Hayama; Keikyū Kurihama Line for Keikyū Kurihama
2	Keikyū Main Line	for Shinagawa

== History ==
The station opened on 8 May 1904.

Keikyu introduced station numbering to its stations on 21 October 2010; Kitashinagawa was assigned station number KK02.

The station is undergoing a reconstruction and will feature elevated platforms as part of Keikyu's Continuous Grade Separation project. Designs for the new station were finalized on 8 June 2026.
