= Tobe Station =

Railway station in Yokohama, Japan

KK38 Tobe Station 戸部駅
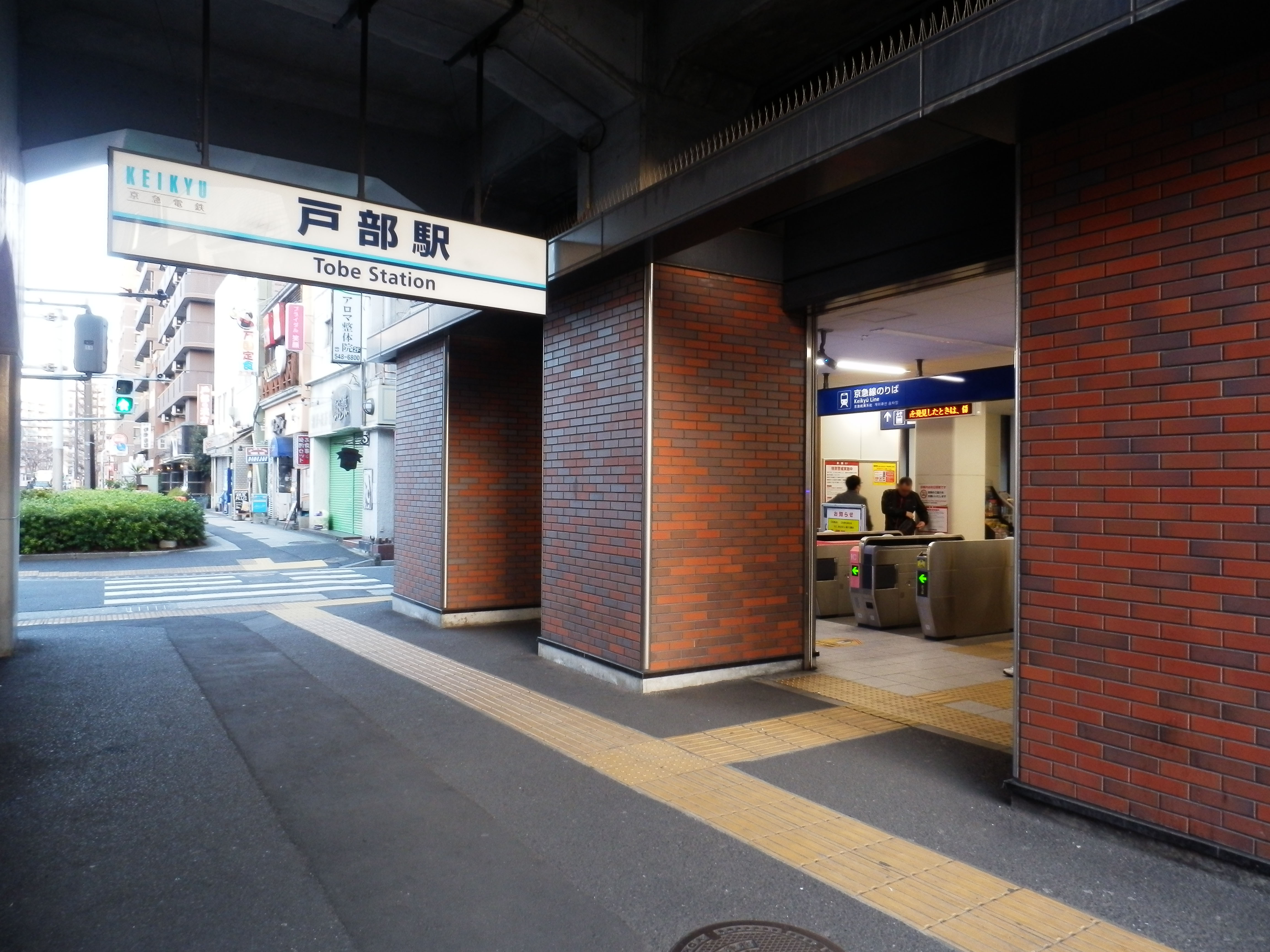
- Tobe Station, 2018

General information
- Location: Tobe-Honchō, Nishi-ku, Yokohama-shi, Kanagawa-ken 220-0041; Japan
- Coordinates: 35.4565°N 139.6197°E
- Operator: Keikyū
- Line: Keikyū Main Line
- Distance: 23.4 km from Shinagawa
- Platforms: 1 island platform
- Connections: Bus stop

Other information
- Station code: KK38
- Website: Official website

History
- Opened: December 26, 1931

Passengers
- 2019: 16,841 daily

Services
Preceding station	Keikyu	Following station
Hinodechō KK39 towards Uraga	Main Line Local	Yokohama KK37 towards Shinagawa
Location
- Location within Kanagawa Prefecture Location within Japan

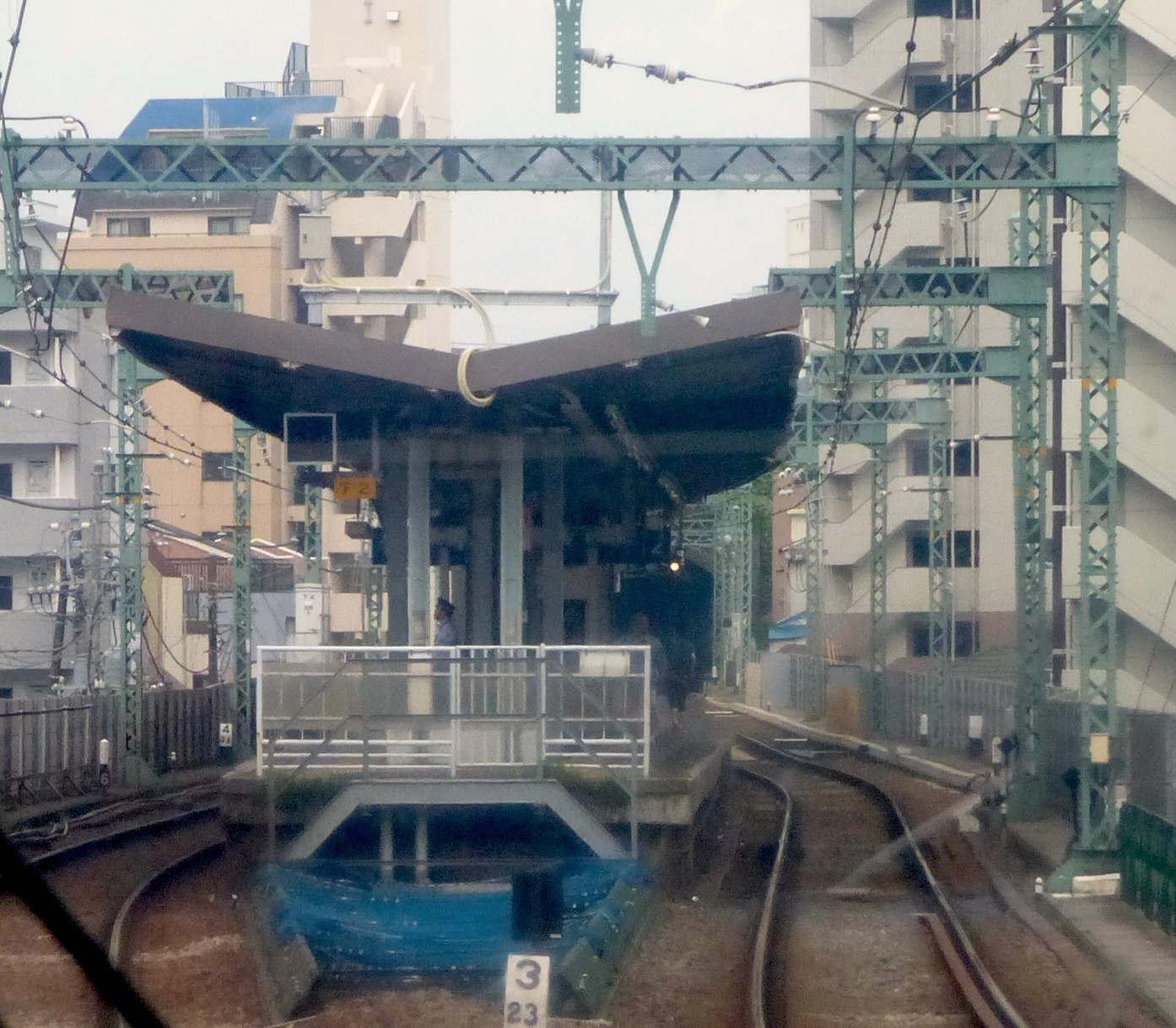
Tobe Station platform, June 2015

Tobe Station (戸部駅, Tobe-eki) is a passenger railway station located in Nishi-ku, Yokohama, Kanagawa Prefecture, Japan, operated by the private railway company Keikyū.

== Lines ==
Tobe Station is served by the Keikyū Main Line and is located 23.4 kilometers from the terminus of the line at Shinagawa Station in Tokyo.

== Station layout ==
The station consists of a single elevated island platform serving two tracks, with the station building underneath. The platform is short, and the station can accommodate only six-car long trains.

=== Platforms ===
1	■ Keikyū Main Line	for Kamiōoka, Zushi·Hayama, Uraga
2	■ Keikyū Main Line	for Yokohama, Haneda Airport, Shinagawa, Sengakuji, Oshiage

== History ==
Tobe Station was opened on 26 December 1931.

Keikyū introduced station numbering to its stations on 21 October 2010; Tobe Station was assigned station number KK38.

== Passenger statistics ==
In fiscal 2019, the station was used by an average of 16,841 passengers daily.

The passenger figures for previous years are as shown below.

Fiscal year	daily average
2005	13,091
2010	15,168
2015	15,612

== Surrounding area ==
- Nishi Ward Office
- Japan National Route 1

== See also ==
- List of railway stations in Japan
