= Hemi Station =

Railway station in Yokosuka, Kanagawa Prefecture, Japan

KK57 Hemi Station 逸見駅
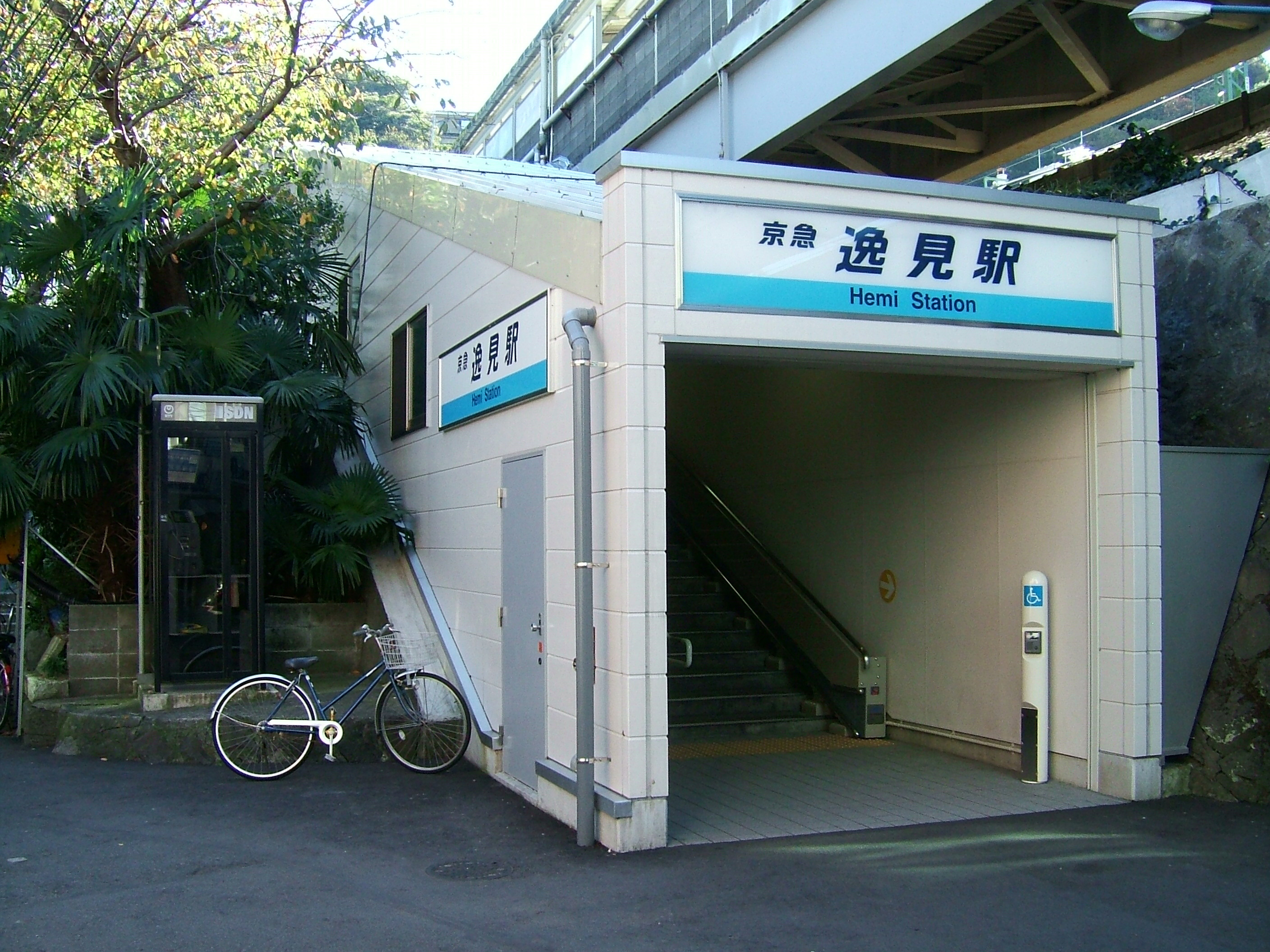
- Entrance of Hemi Station

General information
- Location: Higashi Hemi-cho 2, Yokosuka-shi, Kanagawa-ken 238-0045; Japan
- Coordinates: 35.2807°N 139.6531°E
- Line: Keikyū Main Line
- Distance: 48.1 km from Shinagawa
- Platforms: 2 side platforms
- Tracks: 4
- Connections: Bus stop

Construction
- Accessible: Yes

Other information
- Station code: KK57
- Website: Official website (in Japanese)

History
- Opened: April 1, 1930

Passengers
- 2019: 5,299 daily

Services
Preceding station	Keikyu	Following station
Shioiri KK58 towards Uraga	Main Line Local	Anjinzuka KK56 towards Shinagawa
Location
- Location within Kanagawa Prefecture Location within Japan

Hemi Station (逸見駅, Hemi-eki) is a railway station is a passenger railway station located in the city of Yokosuka, Kanagawa Prefecture, Japan, operated by the private railway company Keikyū.

== Lines ==
Hemi Station is served by the Keikyū Main Line and is located 48.1 kilometers from the northern terminus of the line at Shinagawa Station in Tokyo.

== Station layout ==
The station consists of two elevated opposed side platforms serving two tracks on passing loops to permit the through passage of express trains. The station building is located underneath.

=== Platforms ===
1	■ Keikyū Main Line	for Yokosuka-Chūō, Horinouchi, and Uraga; Keikyū Kurihama Line for Keikyū Kurihama
2	■ Keikyū Main Line	for Yokohama, Keikyū Kamata, and Shinagawa; Keikyū Airport Line for Haneda Airport Terminal 1·2

== History ==
Hemi Station was opened on April 1, 1930 as a station on the Shōnan Electric Railway, which merged with the Keihin Electric Railway on November 1, 1941. At the time, the station had a single island platform. The station was rebuilt into its current platform configuration in 1958.

Keikyū introduced station numbering to its stations on 21 October 2010; Hemi Station was assigned station number KK57.

== Passenger statistics ==
In fiscal 2019, the station was used by an average of 5,299 passengers daily.

The passenger figures for previous years are as shown below.

Fiscal year	daily average
2005	5,219
2010	5,288
2015	5,235

== Surrounding area ==
- Yokosuka City Lifelong Learning Center (Manabikan)
- Yokosuka City Health Promotion Center (Sukoyakan)
- Yokosuka City Izumi Elementary School

== See also ==
- List of railway stations in Japan
