= Shioiri Station (Kanagawa) =

Railway station in Yokosuka, Kanagawa Prefecture, Japan

KK58 Shioiri Station 汐入駅
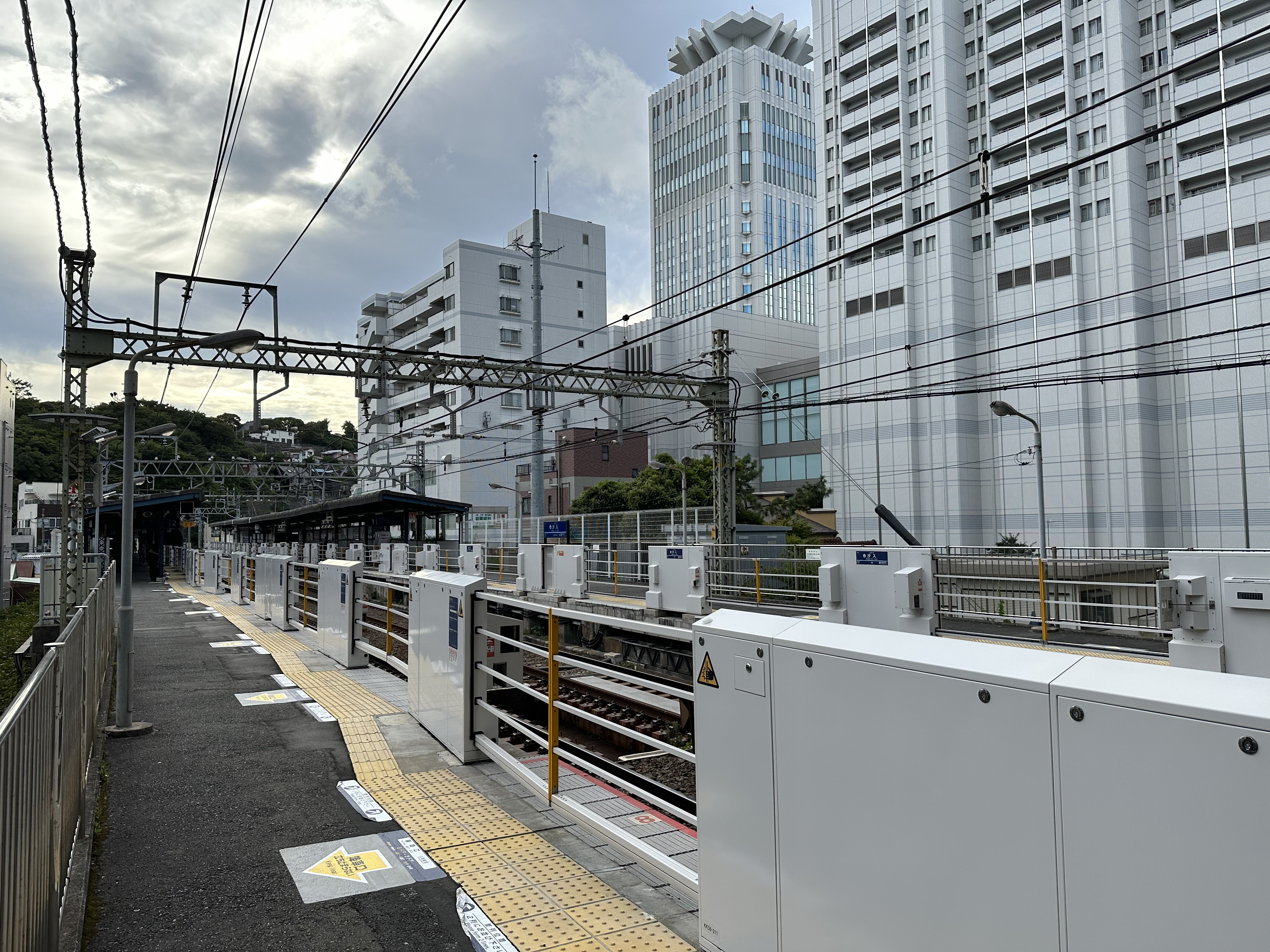
- Station platforms, July 2023

General information
- Location: Shioiri 2-41, Yokosuka-shi, Kanagawa-ken 238-0042; Japan
- Coordinates: 35.2802°N 139.6626°E
- Operator: Keikyū
- Line: Keikyū Main Line
- Distance: 49.2 km from Shinagawa
- Platforms: 2 side platforms
- Connections: Bus stop

Construction
- Accessible: Yes

Other information
- Station code: KK58
- Website: Official website (in Japanese)

History
- Opened: 1 April 1930
- Former names: Yokosuka-Gunkō; Yokosuka-Shioiri (until 1961)

Passengers
- FY2019: 18,162 daily

Services
Preceding station	Keikyu	Following station
Yokosuka-chūō KK59 towards Uraga	Main Line Limited Express (Tokkyū)	Oppama KK54 towards Sengakuji
Yokosuka-chūō KK59 towards Uraga	Main Line Local	Hemi KK57 towards Shinagawa
Location
- Location within Kanagawa Prefecture

Shioiri Station (汐入駅, Shioiri-eki) is a passenger railway station located in the city of Yokosuka, Kanagawa Prefecture, Japan, operated by the private railway company Keikyū.

== Lines ==
Shioiri Station is served by the Keikyū Main Line and is located 49.2 kilometers from the northern terminus of the line at Shinagawa Station in Tokyo.

== Station layout ==
The station consists of two opposed elevated side platforms with the station building underneath. Most of the station is built on an embankment, and the platforms abut a tunnel towards the Yokosuka-chūō side.

Platform screen doors were installed on 12 March 2022 and are scheduled to go into operation by April 2022.

=== Platforms ===
1	■ Keikyū Main Line	for Yokosuka-chūō, Horinouchi, and Uraga; Keikyū Kurihama Line for Keikyū Kurihama and Misakiguchi
2	■ Keikyū Main Line	for Yokohama, Keikyū Kamata, Shinagawa, and Sengakuji; Keikyū Airport Line for Haneda Airport Terminal 1·2; Toei Asakusa Line for Shimbashi and Oshiage; Keisei Oshiage Line for Aoto; Keisei Main Line for Keisei Funabashi and Narita Airport; Hokuso Line for Shin-Kamagaya and Inba-Nihon-Idai; Narita Sky Access Line for Narita Airport

== History ==
Shioiri Station was opened on April 1, 1930, as Yokosuka Gunkō Station (横須賀軍港駅) on the Shōnan Electric Railway, which merged with the Keihin Electric Railway on 1 November 1941. The station was renamed Yokosuka-Shioiri Station (横須賀汐留駅) on 1 October 1940, and to its present name on 1 September 1961.

Keikyū introduced station numbering to its stations on 21 October 2010; Shioiri Station was assigned station number KK58.

== Passenger statistics ==
In fiscal 2019, the station was used by an average of 18,162 passengers daily.

The passenger figures for previous years are as shown below.

Fiscal year	daily average
2005	24,093
2010	22,210
2015	22,127

== Surrounding area ==
- Mercure Yokosuka
- Midorigaoka Girls' Junior and Senior High School
- Yokosuka City Shioiri Elementary School
- Yokosuka Arts Theatre
- Japan National Route 16
- Coaska Bayside Stores
- Yokosuka Station
- Verny Park

== See also ==
- List of railway stations in Japan
