= Zōshiki Station =

Railway station in Tokyo, Japan

Coordinates: 35.5498°N 139.7148°E

KK18 Zōshiki Station 雑色駅
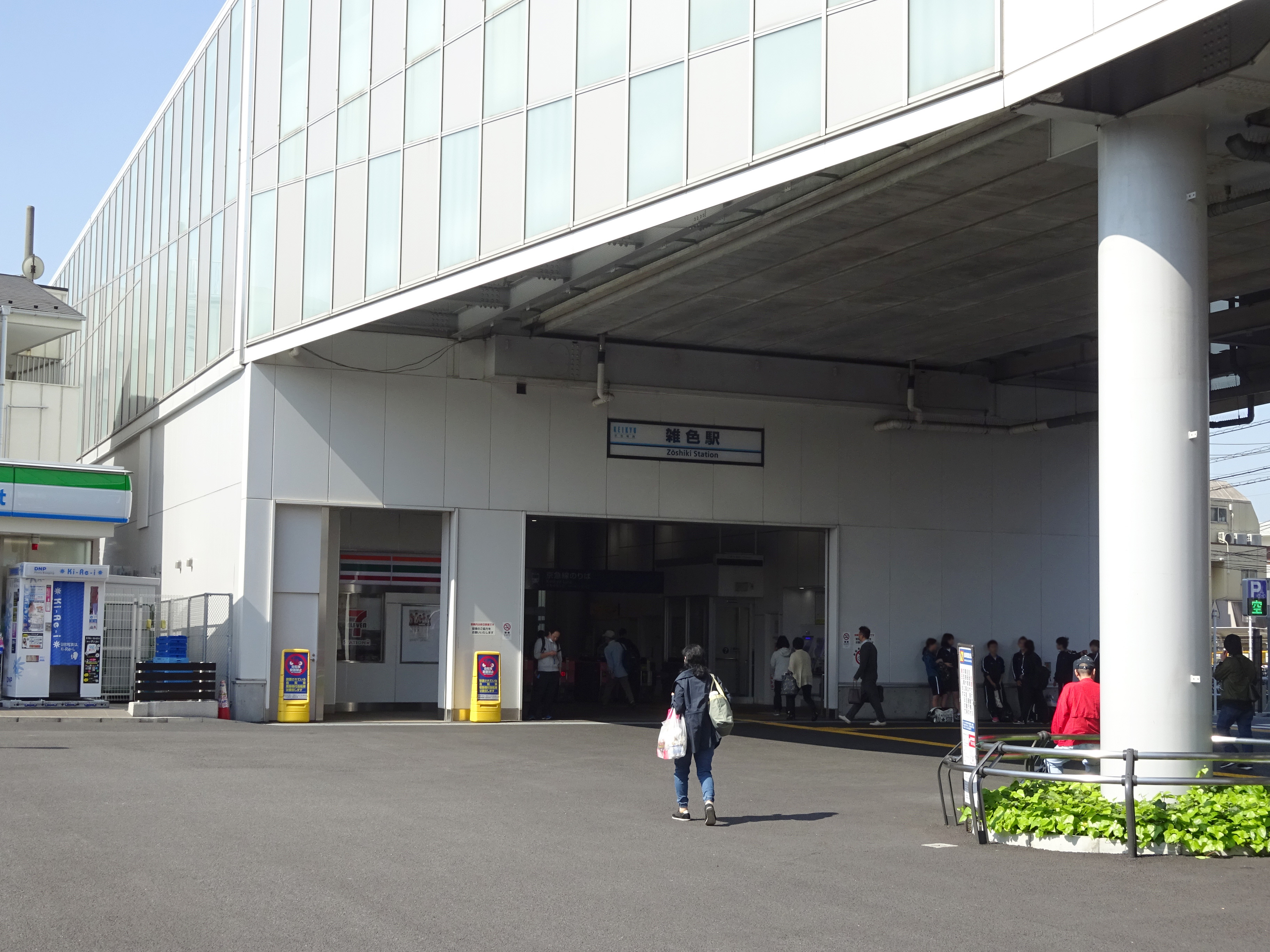
- Entrance to the station in April 2018

General information
- Location: Ōta, Tokyo; Japan
- Operator: Keikyu
- Line: Keikyu Main Line

Construction
- Structure type: Elevated
- Accessible: Yes

History
- Opened: 1 February 1901; 125 years ago

Services
Preceding station	Keikyu	Following station
Rokugōdote KK19 towards Uraga	Main Line Local	Keikyū Kamata KK11 towards Shinagawa
Location

Zōshiki Station (雑色駅, Zōshiki-eki) is a railway station on the Keikyu Main Line in Ōta, Tokyo, Japan, operated by Keikyu.

== Lines ==
Zōshiki Station is served by the Keikyū Main Line.

== Layout ==
This elevated station consists of two side platforms serving two tracks.

1	■ Keikyū Main Line	for Yokohama, Zushi·Hayama, Uraga, Keikyū Kurihama
2	■ Keikyū Main Line	for Keikyū Kamata, Haneda Airport, and Shinagawa

== History ==
Keikyu introduced station numbering to its stations on 21 October 2010; Zōshiki Station was assigned station number KK18.
