= Kenritsudaigaku Station =

Railway station in Yokosuka, Kanagawa Prefecture, Japan

KK60 Kenritsudaigaku Station 県立大学駅
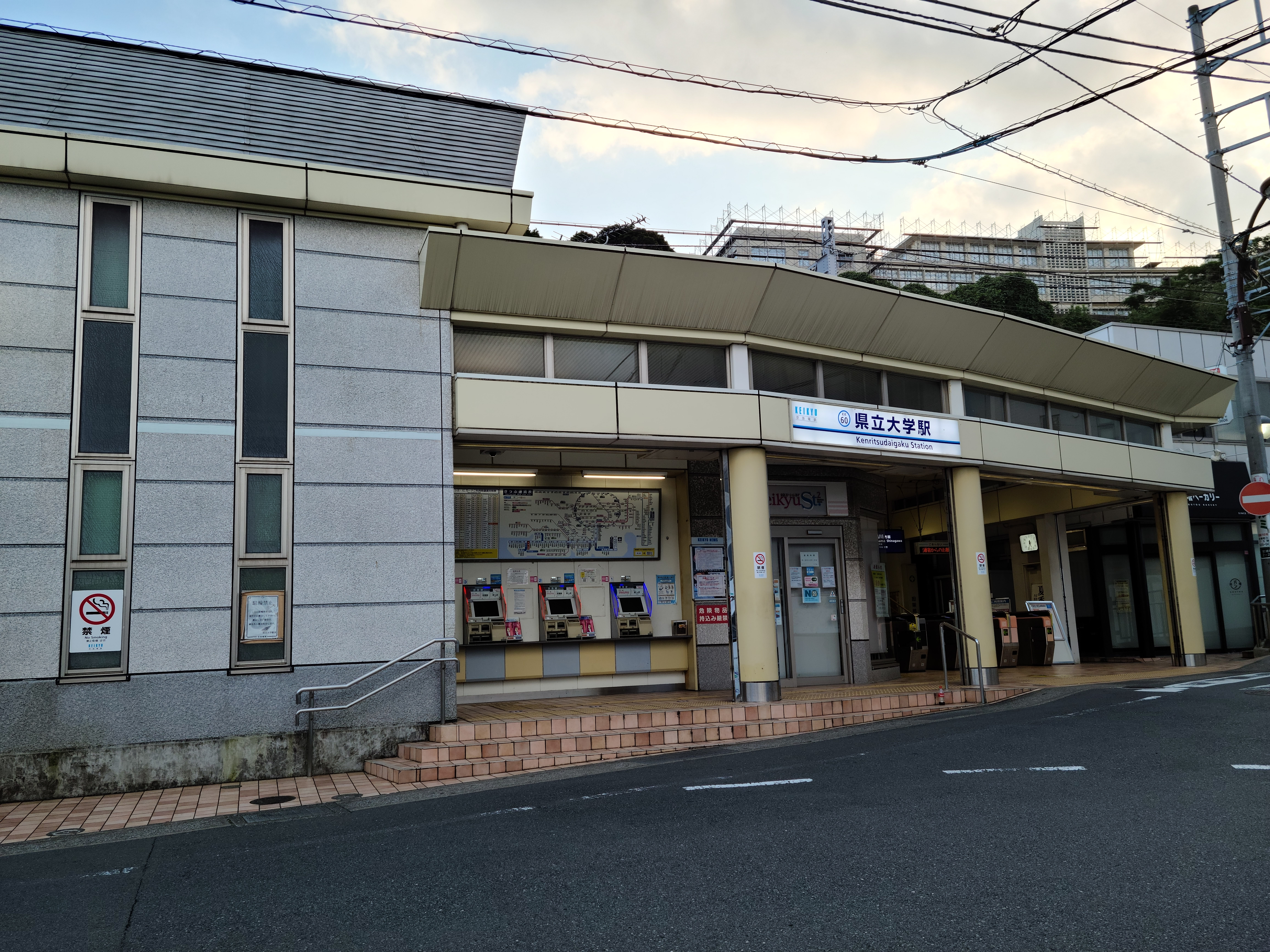
- Kenritsudaigaku Station

General information
- Location: Yasuura-cho 2-chome, Yokosuka-shi, Kanagawa-ken 238-0012; Japan
- Coordinates: 35.2699°N 139.6768°E
- Operator: Keikyū
- Line: Keikyū Main Line
- Distance: 51.1 km from Shinagawa
- Platforms: 1 island platform
- Connections: Bus stop

Construction
- Accessible: Yes

Other information
- Station code: KK60
- Website: Official website (in Japanese)

History
- Opened: April 1, 1930
- Former names: Keikyū-Yasuura; Keihin Yasuura (until 2004)

Passengers
- 2019: 12,350 daily

Services
Preceding station	Keikyu	Following station
Horinouchi KK61 towards Uraga	Main Line Local	Yokosuka-chūō KK59 towards Shinagawa
Location
- Location within Kanagawa Prefecture Location within Japan

Kenritsudaigaku Station (県立大学駅, Kenritsu Daigaku-eki) is a passenger railway station located in the Yasuura neighborhood of the city of Yokosuka, Kanagawa Prefecture, Japan, operated by the private railway company Keikyū.

== Lines ==
Kenritsudaigaku Station is served by the Keikyū Main Line and is located 51.1 kilometers from the northern terminus of the line at Shinagawa Station in Tokyo.

== Station layout ==
The station consists of an elevated single island platform, with the station building underneath. The platform is only long enough to handle six-car trains.

=== Platforms ===
1	■ Keikyū Main Line	for Uraga; Keikyū Kurihama Line for Keikyū Kurihama
2	■ Keikyū Main Line	for Yokohama, Keikyū Kamata, and Shinagawa; Keikyū Airport Line for Haneda Airport Terminal 1·2 Station

== History ==
Kenritsudaigaku Station was opened on April 1, 1930, as Yokosuka-kōgō Station (横須賀公郷駅, Yokosuka-kōgō-eki) on the Shōnan Electric Railway. The Shōnan Electric Railway merged with the Keihin Electric Railway on November 1, 1941, and became the Keihin Electric Express Railway from June 1, 1948. The station was renamed Keihin Yasuura Station (京浜安浦駅, Keihin-Yasuura-eki) on November 1, 1961, and Keikyū Yasuura Station (京急安浦駅, Keikyū-Yasuura-eki) on June 1, 1987. It assumed its present name from February 1, 2004. The station building was rebuilt in April 2005.

Keikyū introduced station numbering to its stations on 21 October 2010; Kenritsudaigaku Station was assigned station number KK60.

== Passenger statistics ==
In fiscal 2019, the station was used by an average of 12,350 passengers daily.

The passenger figures for previous years are as shown below.

Fiscal year	daily average
2005	11,633
2010	12,537
2015	12,475

== Surrounding area ==
- Yokosuka City Otsu Elementary School
- Yokosuka City Otsu Junior High School
- Kanagawa Prefectural Yokosuka Otsu High School
- Kanagawa University of Human Services

== See also ==
- List of railway stations in Japan
