= Shimbamba Station =

Railway station in Tokyo, Japan

KK03 Shimbamba Station 新馬場駅
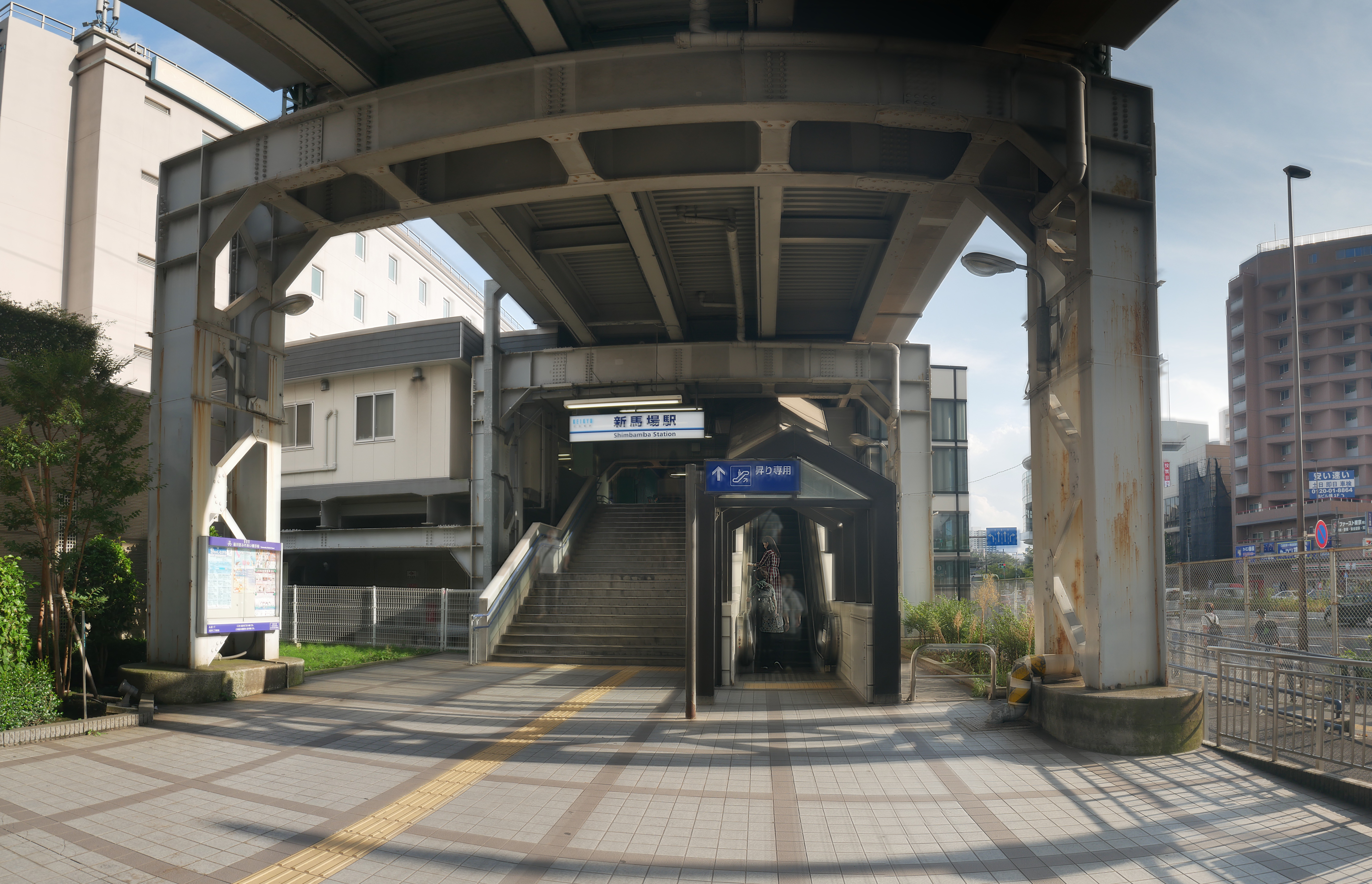
- Shimbamba Station North entrance in 2018

General information
- Other names: Shinboing Station
- Location: Shinagawa, Tokyo; Japan
- Coordinates: 35.6176°N 139.7414°E
- Operator: Keikyu
- Line: Keikyū Main Line
- Platforms: 2 Side platforms
- Tracks: 2

Construction
- Structure type: Elevated
- Cycle facilities: Yes
- Accessible: Yes

Other information
- Station code: KK03
- Website: Official website

History
- Opened: 8 May 1904; 122 years ago

Services
Preceding station	Keikyu	Following station
Aomono-yokochō KK04 towards Uraga	Main Line Local	Kitashinagawa KK02 towards Shinagawa
Location
- Location within Japan

Shimbamba Station (新馬場駅, Shinbanba-eki) is a railway station in Shinagawa, Tokyo, Japan, operated by the private railway operator Keikyu Corporation. It has the station number "KK03".

== Lines ==
- Keikyu
  - Main Line

== Layout ==
Shimbamba Station is an elevated station with two side platforms serving two tracks. Although the station is long enough to handle 12-car trains, only 4 and 6-car local trains stop at this station.

=== Platforms ===
1	Keikyū Main Line	for Keikyū Kamata, Yokohama, and Uraga; Keikyū Zushi Line for Zushi·Hayama; Keikyū Kurihama Line for Keikyū Kurihama
2	Keikyū Main Line	for Shinagawa

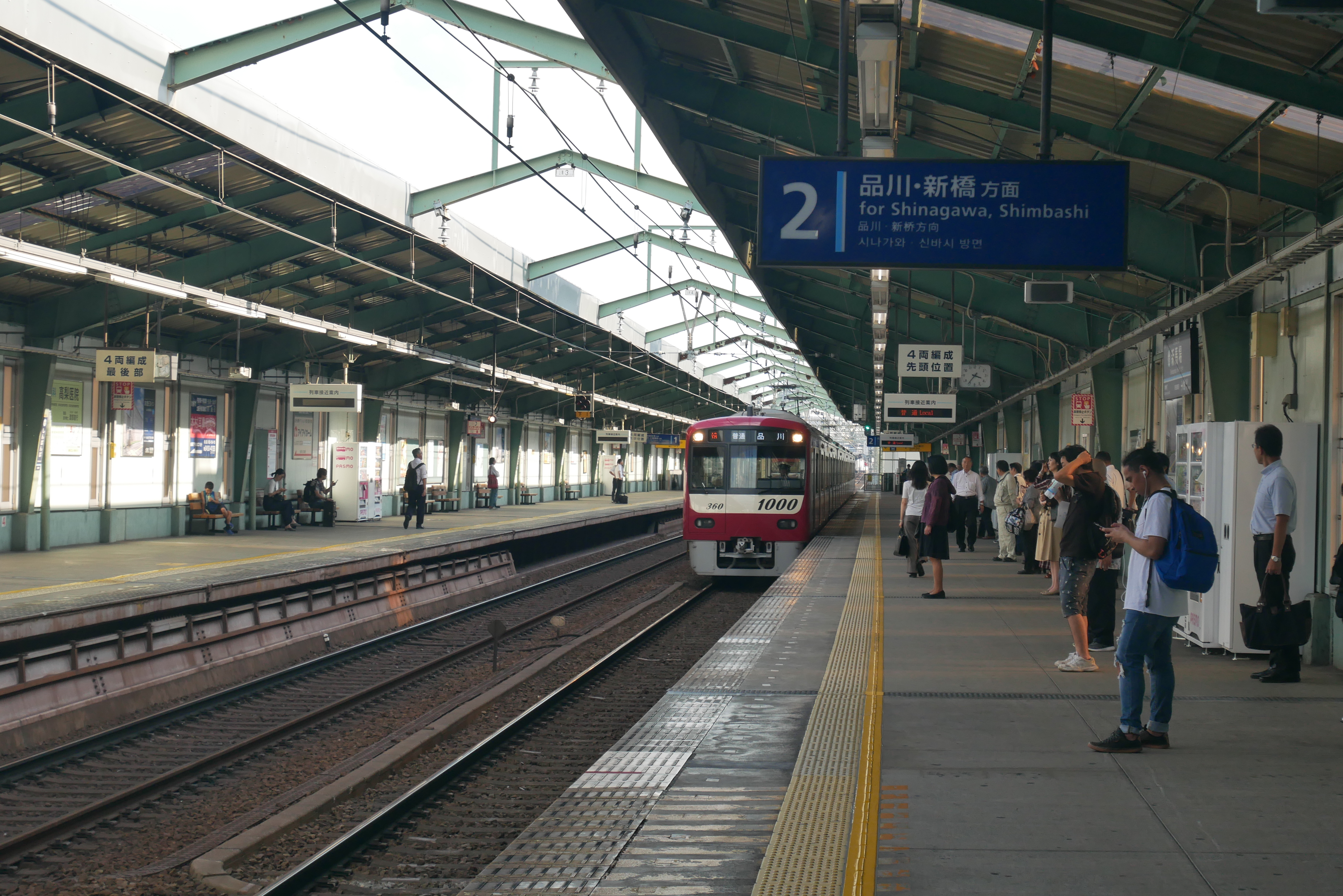
Station platforms and train in September 2018

== History ==
The station opened as an elevated station on October 15, 1976, and replaced the earlier Kitabamba Station and Minamibamba Station. Since the work to elevate and integrate the stations progressed track by track, the two stations had shared one elevated platform for Uraga-bound trains from August 27, 1975, with the transitional station name "Kitabamba·Minamibamba."

Keikyu introduced station numbering to its stations on 21 October 2010; Kitabamba was assigned station number KK03.

== Surrounding area ==
- Kitashinagawa Onsen Tenjin Yu
