= Keikyū Main Line =

Railway line in Tokyo & Kanagawa prefecture, Japan

Keikyu Main Line

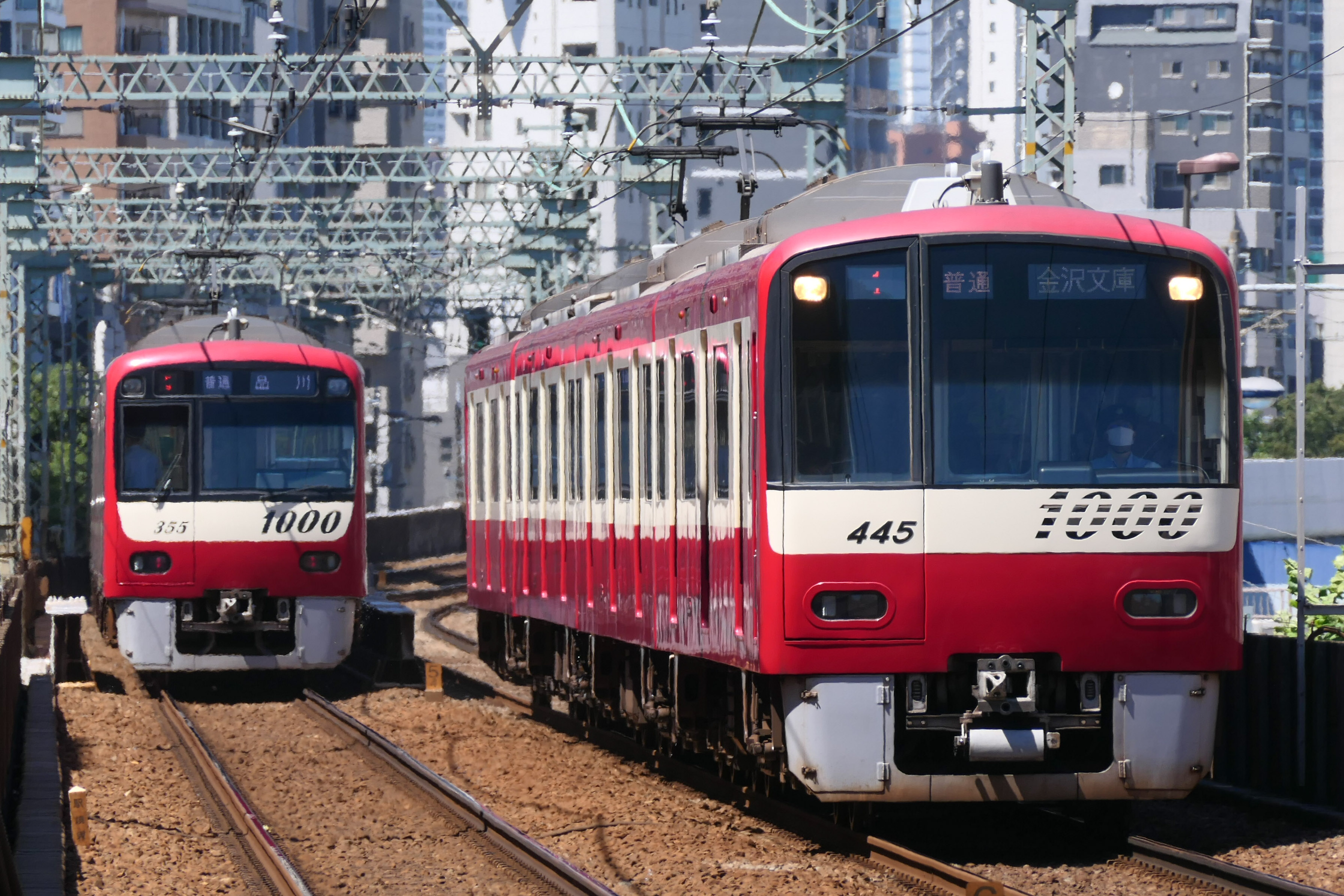
- An N1000 series EMU on the Keikyu Main Line in July 2021

Overview
- Native name: 京急本線
- Owner: Keikyu Corporation
- Locale: Tokyo; Kanagawa Prefecture
- Termini: Shinagawa; Uraga
- Stations: 50

Service
- System: Keikyu
- Route number: KK
- Operator: Keikyu Corporation
- Depot: Kanazawa-Bunko
- Rolling stock: 600; N1000; 1500; 2100
- Daily ridership: 1,129,320 (daily, FY2010)

History
- Opened: 1 February 1901; 125 years ago (as Shonan Electric Railway)

Technical
- Line length: 55.5 km (34.5 mi)
- Number of tracks: 2; 3 (Koyasu–Kanagawa-shimmachi)
- Track gauge: 1,435 mm (4 ft 8 1/2 in) standard gauge
- Old gauge: 1,372 mm (4 ft 6 in)
- Electrification: Overhead line, 1,500 V DC
- Operating speed: 120 km/h (75 mph)
- Signalling: Automatic closed block
- Train protection system: C-ATS
Route map

The Keikyu Main Line (Japanese: 京急本線, Hepburn: Keikyū-honsen) is a private railway line in Japan, operated by Keikyu Corporation. The line connects the Tokyo wards of Minato, Shinagawa, Ōta, and the Kanagawa municipalities of Kawasaki, Yokohama and Yokosuka. The Keikyu Main Line began as a short 2 km (1.2 mi) line in 1895. By 1905 it was extended from Shinagawa Station in Tokyo to central Yokohama, becoming a major interurban line between the two cities.

== Service types ==
(video) A Keikyu Main Line train

Keikyu operates multiple service patterns on its lines.

- Express (Note: 急行, Kyūkō)
- Tokkyū Limited Express
- Kaitoku Limited Express
- Airport Limited Express (Note: エアポート快特, Eapōto Kaitoku)
- Evening Wing: (Note: イブニング・ウィング号, Ibuningu Uingu-gō) A Home Liner service with reserved seating and a surcharge, operating on weekday evenings from Shinagawa to Horinouchi on the Main Line, then to Misakiguchi on the Kurihama Line.
- Morning Wing: (Note: モーニング・ウィング号, Mōningu Uingu-gō) A Home Liner service with reserved seating and a surcharge, operating on weekday mornings from Miurakaigan on the Kurihama Line to Sengakuji. Trains bypass major interchange stations Kanazawa-hakkei, Yokohama, and Keikyū Kamata.

== Stations ==
Local trains stop at all stations.

No.	Name	Distance from Shinagawa in km (mi)	Express		Tokkyū Ltd. Exp.	Kaitoku Ltd. Exp.	Airport Ltd. Exp.	Evening Wing	Morning Wing	Transfers	Location
↑ Through-running via Asakusa Line and Oshiage Line to/from ↑: Narita Airport via the Main Line; Narita Airport via the Main Line and Narita Sky Access Line; Imba Nihon-idai via the Main Line and Hokusō Line
A-07	Sengakuji 泉岳寺	1.2 (0.75)	●		●	●	●		●	Asakusa Line (A-07; through service); Yamanote Line (Takanawa Gateway: JY26); Keihin–Tōhoku Line (Takanawa Gateway: JK21)	Minato, Tokyo
KK01	Shinagawa 品川	0 (0)	●		●	●	●	●	●	Tokaido Shinkansen; Tōkaidō Line (JT03); Yamanote Line (JY25); Keihin–Tōhoku Line (JK20); Yokosuka Line (JO17)	Minato, Tokyo
KK02	Kitashinagawa 北品川	0.7 (0.43)	|		|	|	|	↓	↑		Shinagawa, Tokyo
KK03	Shimbamba 新馬場	1.4 (0.87)	|		|	|	|	↓	↑		Shinagawa, Tokyo
KK04	Aomono-yokochō 青物横丁	2.2 (1.4)	●		●	|	|	↓	↑		Shinagawa, Tokyo
KK05	Samezu 鮫洲	2.7 (1.7)	|		|	|	|	↓	↑		Shinagawa, Tokyo
KK06	Tachiaigawa 立会川	3.5 (2.2)	●		|	|	|	↓	↑		Shinagawa, Tokyo
KK07	Ōmorikaigan 大森海岸	4.8 (3.0)	|		|	|	|	↓	↑		Shinagawa, Tokyo
KK08	Heiwajima 平和島	5.7 (3.5)	●		●	|	|	↓	↑		Ōta, Tokyo
KK09	Ōmorimachi 大森町	6.5 (4.0)	|		|	|	|	↓	↑		Ōta, Tokyo
KK10	Umeyashiki 梅屋敷	7.2 (4.5)	|		|	|	|	↓	↑		Ōta, Tokyo
KK11	Keikyū Kamata 京急蒲田	8.0 (5.0)	●	●	●	●	|	●	↑	Airport Line (KK11; through service)	Ōta, Tokyo
KK18	Zōshiki 雑色	9.4 (5.8)		|	|	|		↓	↑		Ōta, Tokyo
KK19	Rokugōdote 六郷土手	10.6 (6.6)		|	|	|		↓	↑		Ōta, Tokyo
KK20	Keikyū Kawasaki 京急川崎	11.8 (7.3)		●	●	●		●	↑	Daishi Line (KK20); (Kawasaki); Tōkaidō Line (JT04) Keihin–Tōhoku Line (JK16) Nambu Line (JN01)	Kawasaki-ku, Kawasaki, Kanagawa
KK27	Hatchō-nawate 八丁畷	13.1 (8.1)		|	|	|		↓	↑	Nambu Branch Line (JN51)	Kawasaki-ku, Kawasaki, Kanagawa
KK28	Tsurumi-ichiba 鶴見市場	13.8 (8.6)		|	|	|		↓	↑		Tsurumi-ku, Yokohama, Kanagawa
KK29	Keikyū Tsurumi 京急鶴見	15.3 (9.5)		●	|	|		↓	↑	(Tsurumi); Keihin–Tōhoku Line (JK15) Tsurumi Line (JI01)	Tsurumi-ku, Yokohama, Kanagawa
KK30	Kagetsu-sōjiji 花月総持寺	16.1 (10.0)		|	|	|		↓	↑		Tsurumi-ku, Yokohama, Kanagawa
KK31	Namamugi 生麦	16.9 (10.5)		|	|	|		↓	↑		Tsurumi-ku, Yokohama, Kanagawa
KK32	Keikyū Shinkoyasu 京急新子安	18.3 (11.4)		|	|	|		↓	↑	Keihin–Tōhoku Line (Shin-Koyasu: JK14)	Kanagawa-ku, Yokohama, Kanagawa
KK33	Koyasu 子安	19.3 (12.0)		|	|	|		↓	↑		Kanagawa-ku, Yokohama, Kanagawa
KK34	Kanagawa-shimmachi 神奈川新町	20.0 (12.4)		●	●	|		↓	↑		Kanagawa-ku, Yokohama, Kanagawa
KK35	Keikyū Higashi-kanagawa 京急東神奈川	20.5 (12.7)		●	|	|		↓	↑	Higashi-Kanagawa; Keihin–Tōhoku Line (JK13) Yokohama Line (JH13)	Kanagawa-ku, Yokohama, Kanagawa
KK36	Kanagawa 神奈川	21.5 (13.4)		|	|	|		↓	↑		Kanagawa-ku, Yokohama, Kanagawa
KK37	Yokohama 横浜	22.2 (13.8)		●	●	●		●	↑	Tōkaidō Line (JT05); Keihin–Tōhoku Line (JK12); Negishi Line (JK12); Yokosuka Line (JO13); Shōnan–Shinjuku Line (JS13); Tōyoko Line (TY21); Minatomirai Line (MM01); Sōtetsu Main Line (SO01); Blue Line (B20)	Nishi-ku, Yokohama, Kanagawa
KK38	Tobe 戸部	23.4 (14.5)		|	|	|		↓	↑		Nishi-ku, Yokohama, Kanagawa
KK39	Hinodechō 日ノ出町	24.8 (15.4)		●	|	|		↓	↑		Naka-ku, Yokohama, Kanagawa
KK40	Koganechō 黄金町	25.6 (15.9)		|	|	|		↓	↑		Minami-ku, Yokohama, Kanagawa
KK41	Minamiōta 南太田	26.5 (16.5)		|	|	|		↓	↑		Minami-ku, Yokohama, Kanagawa
KK42	Idogaya 井土ヶ谷	27.7 (17.2)		●	|	|		↓	↑		Minami-ku, Yokohama, Kanagawa
KK43	Gumyōji 弘明寺	29.1 (18.1)		●	|	|		↓	↑		Minami-ku, Yokohama, Kanagawa
KK44	Kamiōoka 上大岡	30.8 (19.1)		●	●	●		●	●	Blue Line (B11)	Kōnan-ku, Yokohama
KK45	Byōbugaura 屏風浦	33.0 (20.5)		|	|	|		↓	↑		Isogo-ku, Yokohama, Kanagawa
KK46	Sugita 杉田	34.3 (21.3)		●	|	|		↓	↑	Negishi Line (Shin-Sugita: JK05); Kanazawa Seaside Line (Shin-Sugita: 1)	Isogo-ku, Yokohama, Kanagawa
KK47	Keikyū Tomioka 京急富岡	36.7 (22.8)		|	|	|		↓	↑		Kanazawa-ku, Yokohama, Kanagawa
KK48	Nōkendai 能見台	37.4 (23.2)		●	|	|		↓	↑		Kanazawa-ku, Yokohama, Kanagawa
KK49	Kanazawa-bunko 金沢文庫	39.5 (24.5)		●	●	●		●	●		Kanazawa-ku, Yokohama, Kanagawa
KK50	Kanazawa-hakkei 金沢八景	40.9 (25.4)		●	●	●		●	↑	Zushi Line (KK50; through service); Kanazawa Seaside Line (14)	Kanazawa-ku, Yokohama, Kanagawa
KK54	Oppama 追浜	42.8 (26.6)			●	|		↓	↑		Yokosuka, Kanagawa
KK55	Keikyū Taura 京急田浦	44.5 (27.7)			|	|		↓	↑		Yokosuka, Kanagawa
KK56	Anjinzuka 安針塚	47.1 (29.3)			|	|		↓	↑		Yokosuka, Kanagawa
KK57	Hemi 逸見	48.1 (29.9)			|	|		↓	↑		Yokosuka, Kanagawa
KK58	Shioiri 汐入	49.2 (30.6)			●	|		↓	↑		Yokosuka, Kanagawa
KK59	Yokosuka-chūō 横須賀中央	49.9 (31.0)			●	●		●	●		Yokosuka, Kanagawa
KK60	Kenritsudaigaku 県立大学	51.1 (31.8)			|	|		↓	↑		Yokosuka, Kanagawa
KK61	Horinouchi 堀ノ内	52.3 (32.5)			●	●		●	↑	Kurihama Line (KK61; through service)	Yokosuka, Kanagawa
KK62	Keikyū Ōtsu 京急大津	53.1 (33.0)			●						Yokosuka, Kanagawa
KK63	Maborikaigan 馬堀海岸	54.2 (33.7)			●						Yokosuka, Kanagawa
KK64	Uraga 浦賀	55.5 (34.5)			●						Yokosuka, Kanagawa

== History ==
All sections of the line were built as dual track. The Keihin Railway opened the Kawasaki to Omori section in 1901 as a 1,435 mm (4 ft 8 1/2 in) standard gauge line electrified at 600 V DC. In 1904, the line was regauged to a narrower 1,372 mm (4 ft 6 in) and extended to Shinagawa.

In 1930, the Shonan Electric Railway opened the Uraga to Koganecho section as a standard gauge line electrified at 1,500 V DC. In 1931, the line from Yokohama was extended to connect at Koganecho. Freight services ceased in 1932, the line was regauged to standard gauge the following year, and in 1936, the voltage on the Shonan line was reduced to 600 V DC.

In 1941, the Shonan Electric Railway merged with the Keihin Railway, which merged with Tokyu the following year. The voltage on the entire line was raised to 1,500 V DC in 1945, and in 1948, the Keihin Electric Railway was created to operate the railway.

In October 2012 the section between Heiwajima and Rokugōdote stations was elevated to remove a number of at grade crossings. Keikyū Kamata Station was rebuilt as a new complex dual level junction to connect the Mainline with the Airport Line. Elevation of the section between Shinagawa and Shimbamba, including a rebuilding of the Kitashinagawa station, is underway as of 2023, due to be completed in 2029.

From the start of the revised weekday timetable on 7 December 2015, two Morning Wing limited-stop commuter services from Miurakaigan on the Keikyu Kurihama Line to Shinagawa and Sengakuji in Tokyo were introduced. These stop at Yokosuka-chuo, Kanazawa-Bunko, and Kamiōoka en route.

From the timetable revision effective 25 November 2023, all "Airport Express" services were renamed to "Express" while abandoning the airplane symbology used on these services.

From the start of the revised timetable on 23 November 2024, all Evening Wing services began stopping at Keikyū Kamata, Keikyū Kawasaki, and Yokohama.

== Accidents ==
On 7 April 1997, at about 2:47 pm, the first three cars of a four-car train derailed after colliding with a mudslide, resulting in 22 people injured. The accident occurred between Keikyū Taura and Anjinzuka stations, with approximately 60 people on board. Heavy rains caused the mudslide, 7 months after a report by the train company to the Transportation Minister that there was little probability of such an occurrence in that area. 500 workers were mobilized as the train service was temporarily suspended between Kanazawa-Hakkei and Horinouchi stations.

On 24 November 2000, at about 5:20 am, the front car of a four-car train derailed after a truck collided with the first car of the train at a level crossing, resulting in injuries to three passengers. The accident occurred in Yokosuka, and the approximately 100 commuters on board later walked about 200 m to the nearest station to continue their journeys via bus. The driver of the truck reported his foot became stuck between the accelerator and brake pedals, sending him through the crossing bar and into the crossing. Normal operations continued about 4 hours later that morning.

On 24 September 2012, at about 11:58 pm, the first three cars of an eight-car train derailed after colliding with a mudslide, resulting in injuries to 28 people including the train driver. Seven men and women were seriously injured, including fractures, broken ribs and pelvises. The accident occurred between Oppama and Keikyū Taura stations, between Yokohama and Yokosuka, with approximately 700 passengers on board. Heavy rains caused the mudslide, sweeping away safety nets that had been installed in 1998, the year after a similar mudslide in the area. An area of soil about 12 metres high and 15 metres wide fell onto the tracks, bringing trees and fencing structures with it. The train was travelling at 75 km/h (47 mph) before the driver applied the brakes, 30 to 40 m (98 to 131 ft) before the mudslide. Train services were temporarily suspended between Kanazawa-Hakkei and Hemi stations and temporary bus services were provided by the train company until normal operations resumed approximately 55 hours later after the assessment and clean-up process. The train was scrapped in the aftermath.

On 18 April 2013, at about 4:30 pm, two window panes shattered in the front car of a commuter train while passing an express train going the opposite direction, resulting in minor lacerations to two high school students sitting with their backs to the windows. One window pane was also cracked on the passing train with no injuries. The accident occurred between Keikyu Taura and Anjinzuka stations, with approximately 30 people in the car at the time of the accident.

On 5 September 2019 at 11:43 am, a rapid limited express (Aoto on the Keisei Oshiage Line to Misakiguchi) collided with a truck and derailed at a level crossing between Kanagawa-shimmachi and Nakakido (now; Keikyū Higashi-Kanagawa) Stations in Yokohama's Kanagawa Ward. The truck driver, identified as 67-year-old Michio Motohashi, was killed. 35 others were injured. According to the police and other reports, Motohashi was driving fruits from Yokohama to Narita and got stuck on the level crossing after attempting a right turn from a narrow side road that was not part of his normal route. Police were also investigating to see if the train operator correctly applied the brakes. Trains were suspended between Keikyū Kawasaki and Kamiōoka Stations until the afternoon of 7 September. The train was scrapped in the aftermath.

== Gallery ==
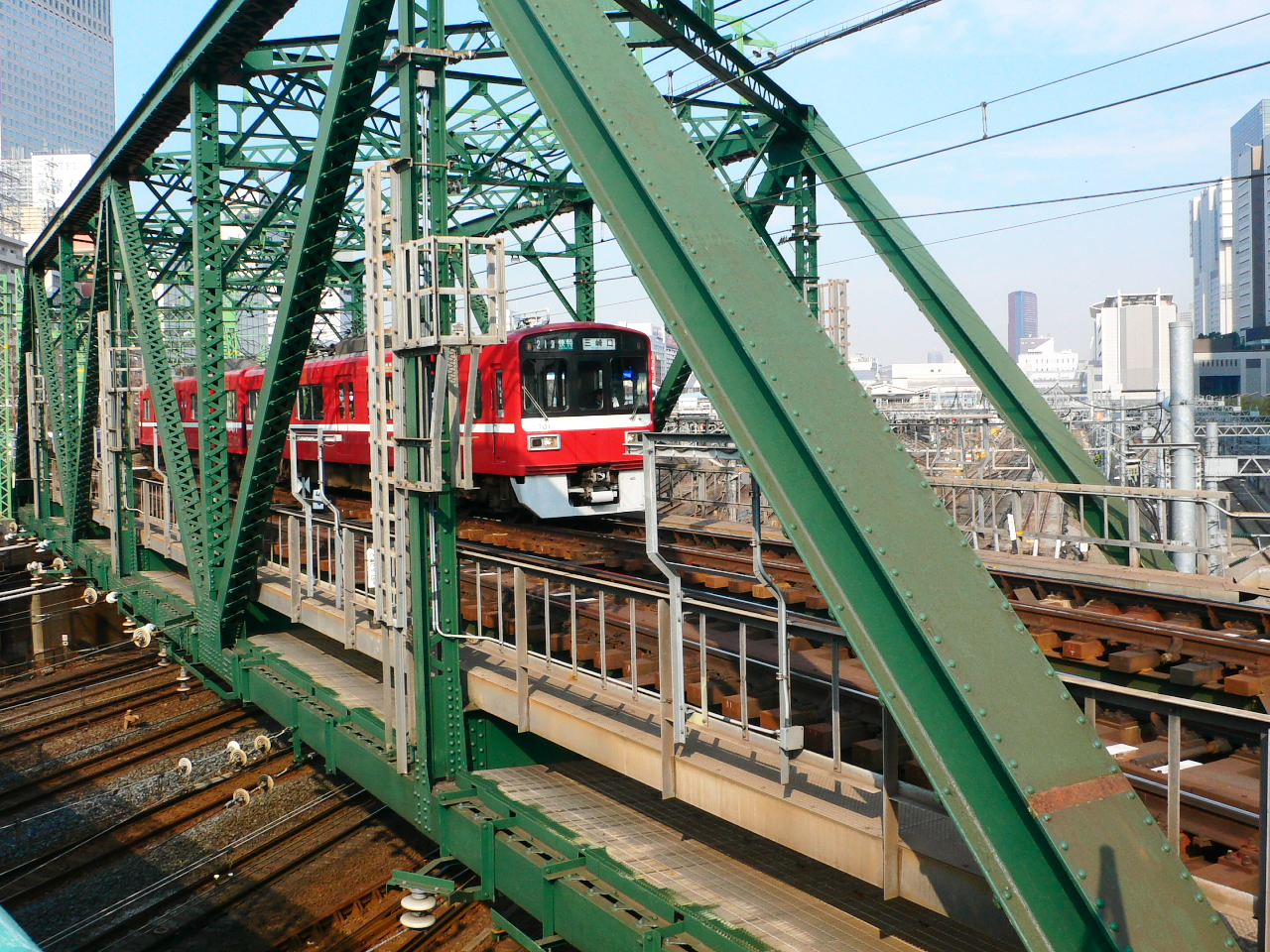
Between Shinagawa Station and Kitashinagawa Station

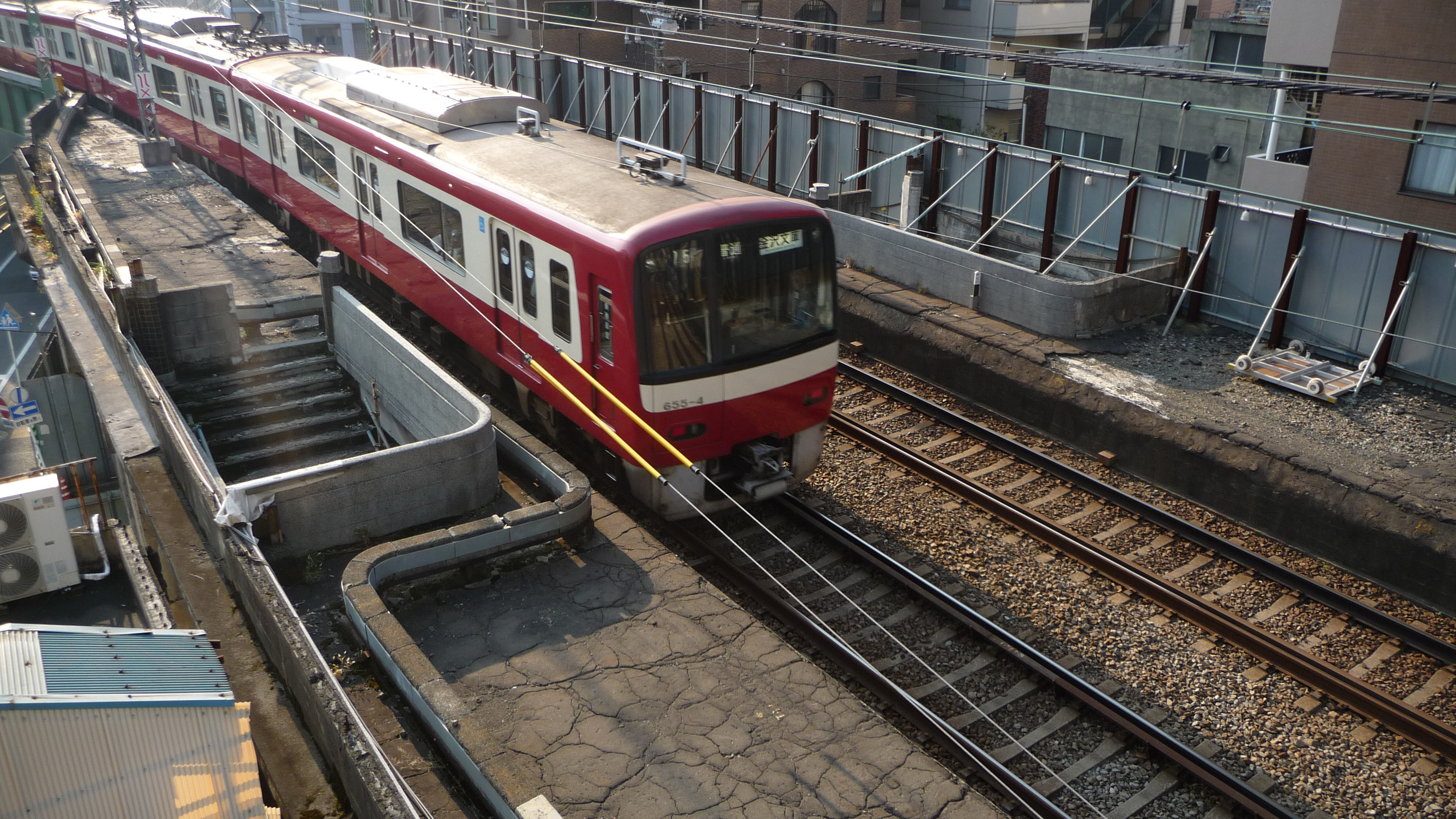
Between Yokohama Station and Tobe Station as seen from the former Hiranuma Station

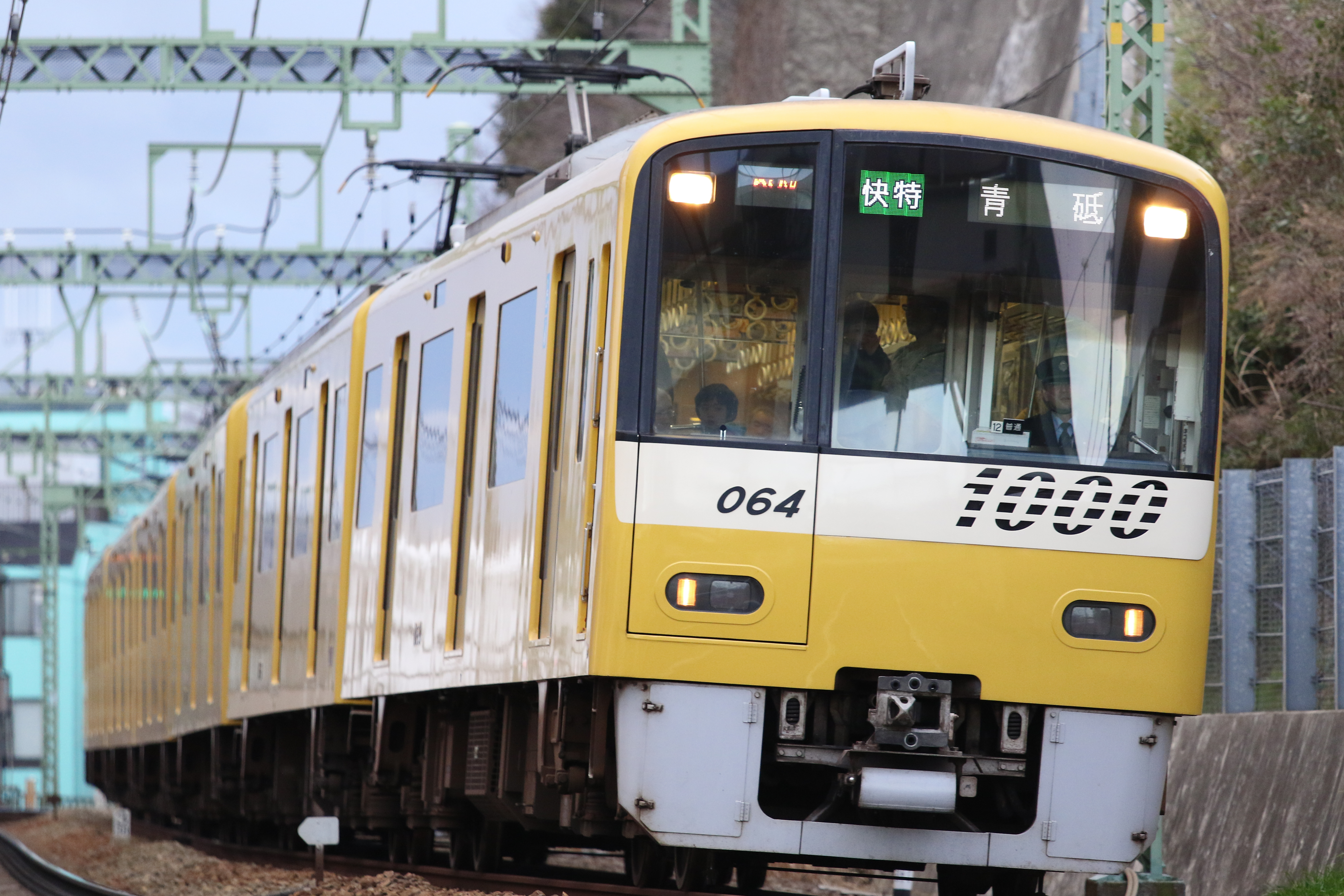
Between Nōkendai Station and Kanazawa-bunko Station

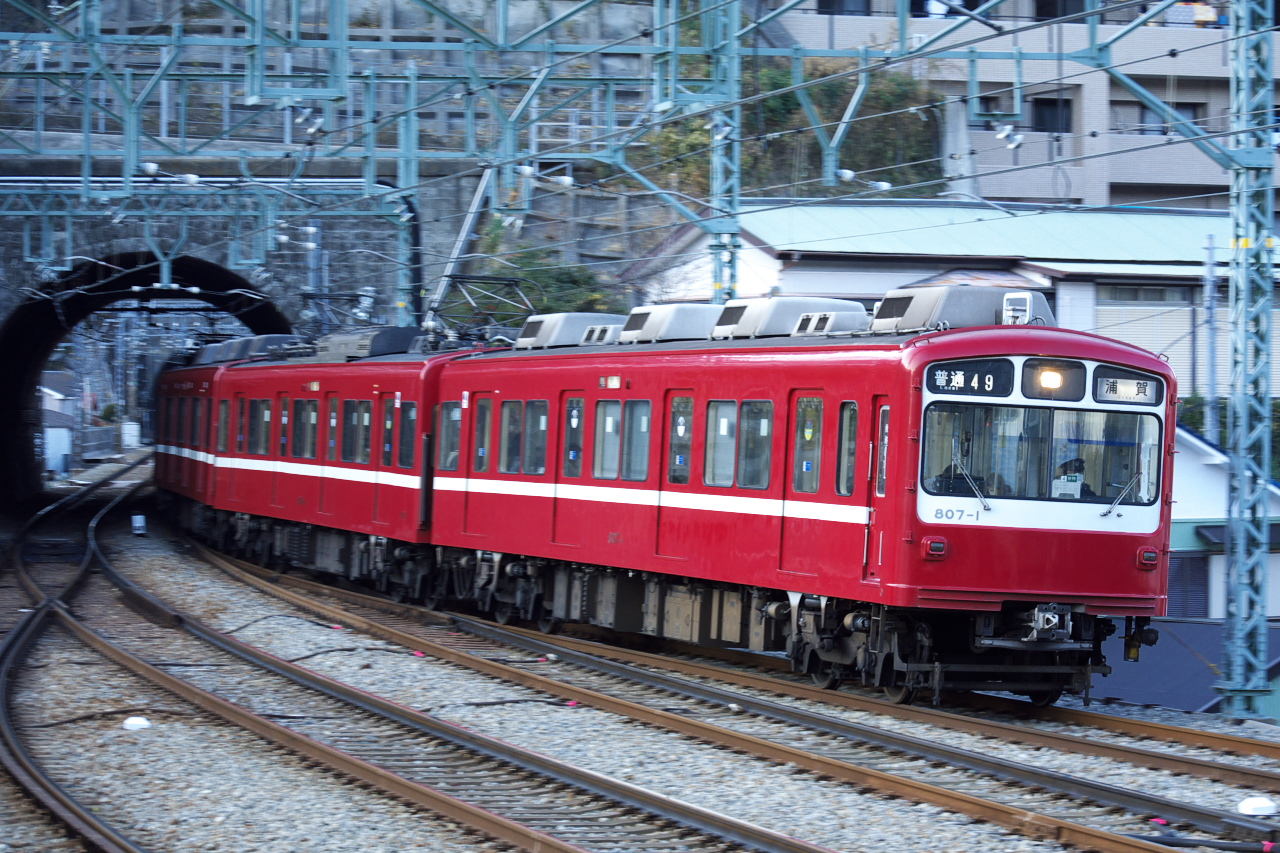
At Hemi Station

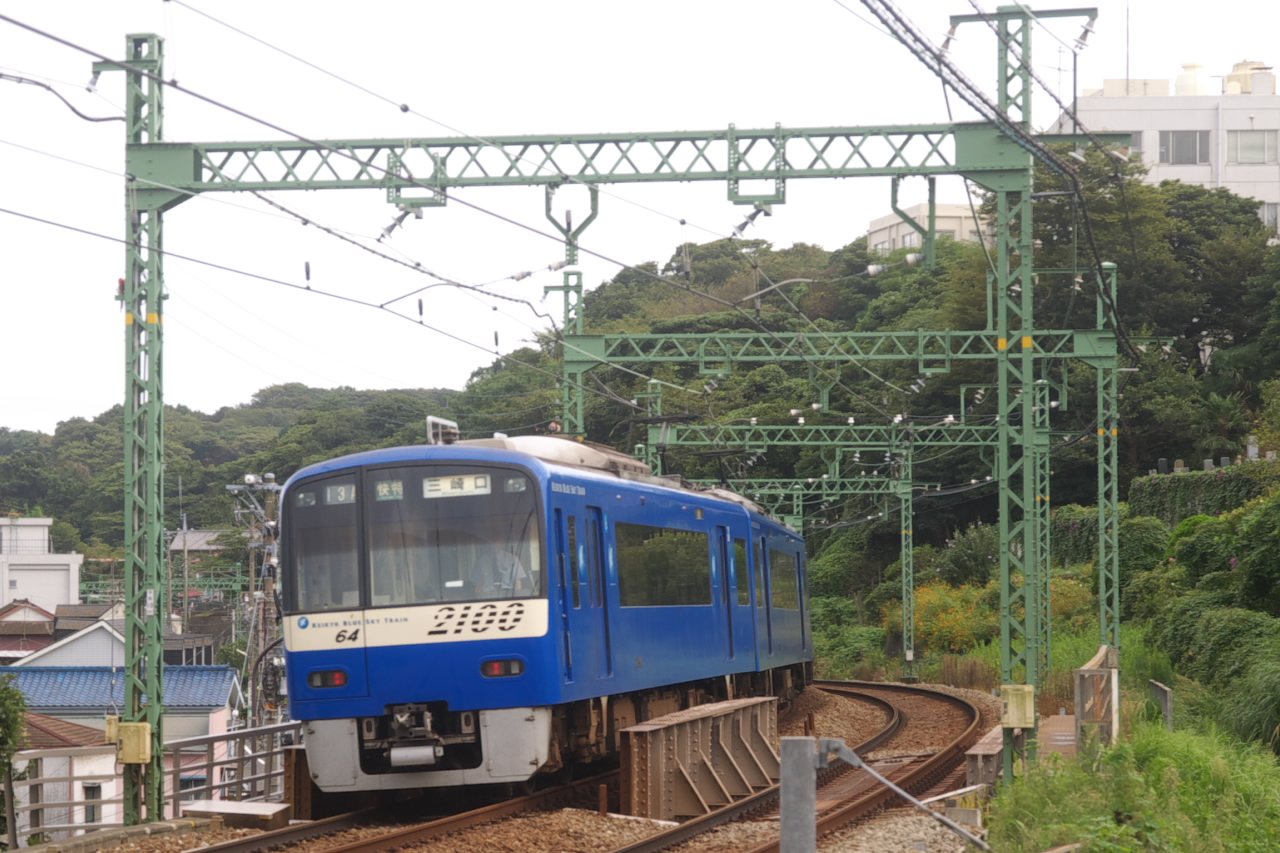
Between Yokosuka-chūō Station and Kenritsudaigaku Station

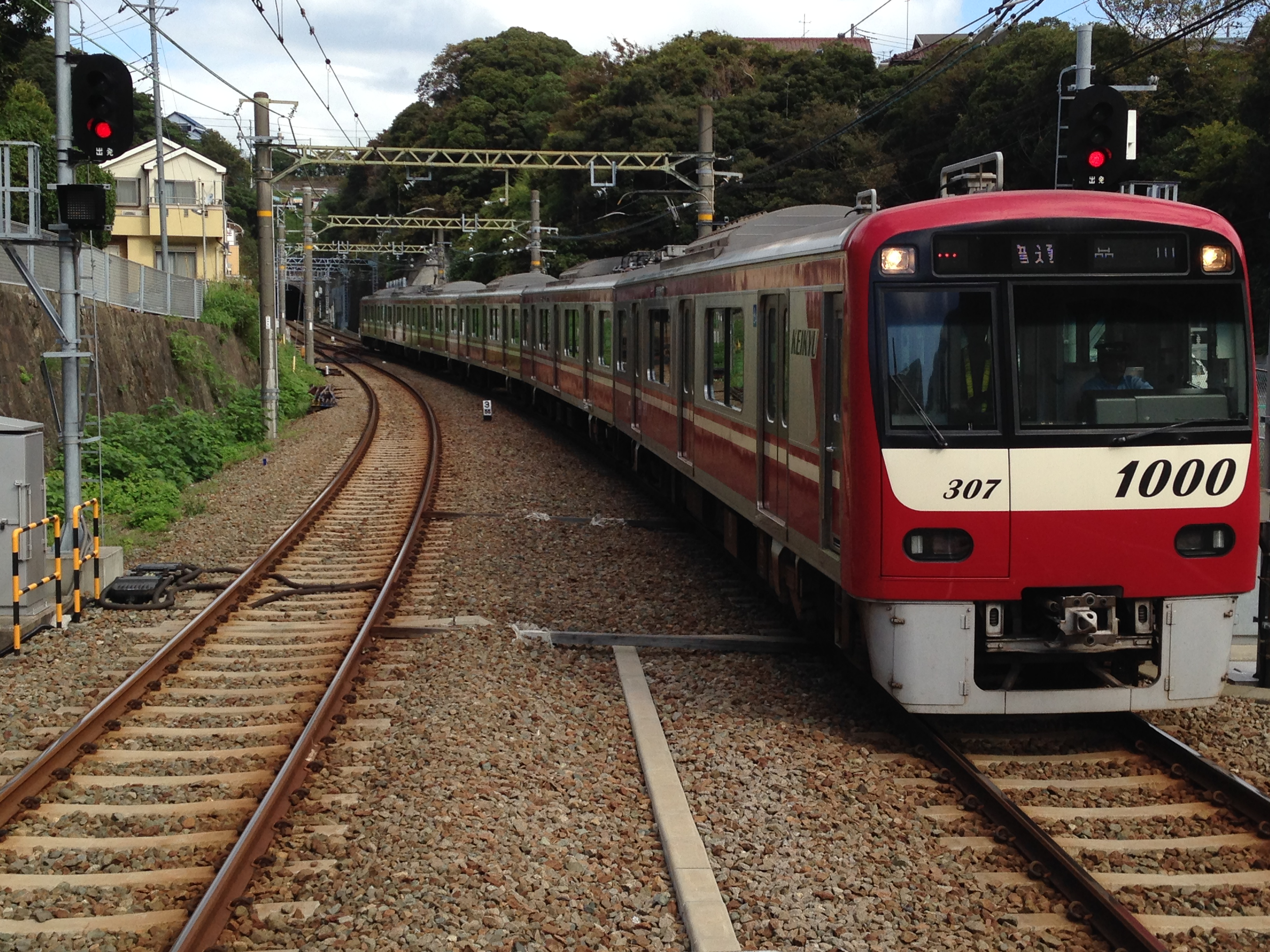
At Uraga Station

== See also ==
- List of railway lines in Japan
