= Yokosuka-chūō Station =

Railway station in Yokosuka, Kanagawa Prefecture, Japan

KK59 Yokosuka-chūō Station 横須賀中央駅
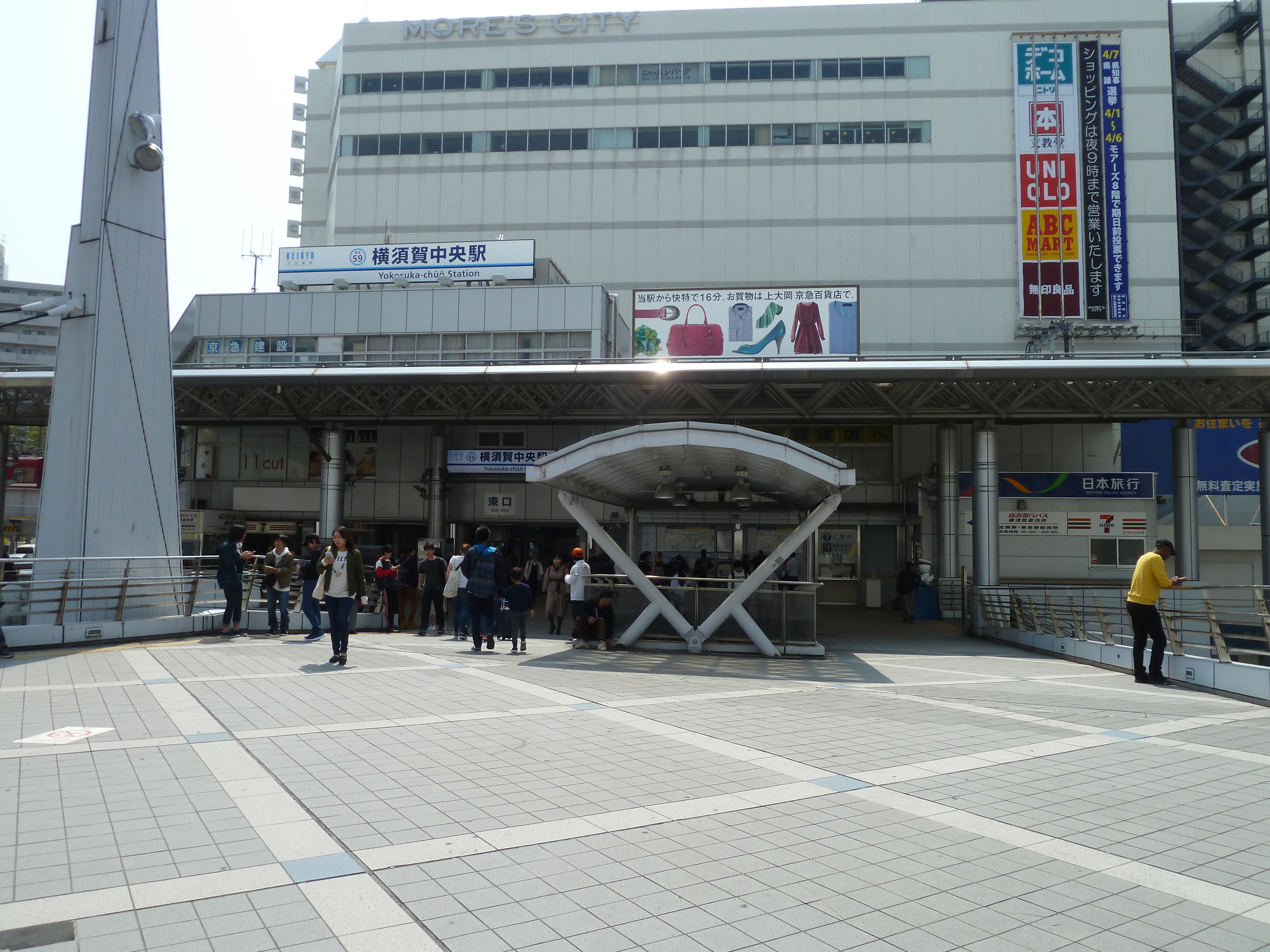
- Yokosuka-chūō Station building in April 2019

General information
- Location: 2-25 Wakamatsu-chō, Yokosuka-shi, Kanagawa-ken 238-0007; Japan
- Coordinates: 35.2785°N 139.6701°E
- Operator: Keikyū
- Line: Keikyū Main Line
- Distance: 49.9 km from Shinagawa
- Platforms: 2 side platforms
- Connections: Bus stop

Construction
- Accessible: Yes

Other information
- Station code: KK59
- Website: Official website (in Japanese)

History
- Opened: April 1, 1930

Passengers
- 2019: 68,092 daily

Services
Preceding station	Keikyu	Following station
Miurakaigan One-way operation	Morning Wing	Kanazawa-bunko KK49 towards Sengakuji
Horinouchi KK61 towards Misakiguchi	Evening Wing	Kanazawa-hakkei One-way operation
Horinouchi KK61 Terminus	Main Line Limited Express (Kaitoku)	Kanazawa-hakkei KK50 towards Sengakuji
Horinouchi KK61 towards Uraga	Main Line Limited Express (Tokkyū)	Shioiri KK58 towards Sengakuji
Kenritsudaigaku KK60 towards Uraga	Main Line Local	Shioiri KK58 towards Sengakuji
Location
- Location within Kanagawa Prefecture Location within Japan

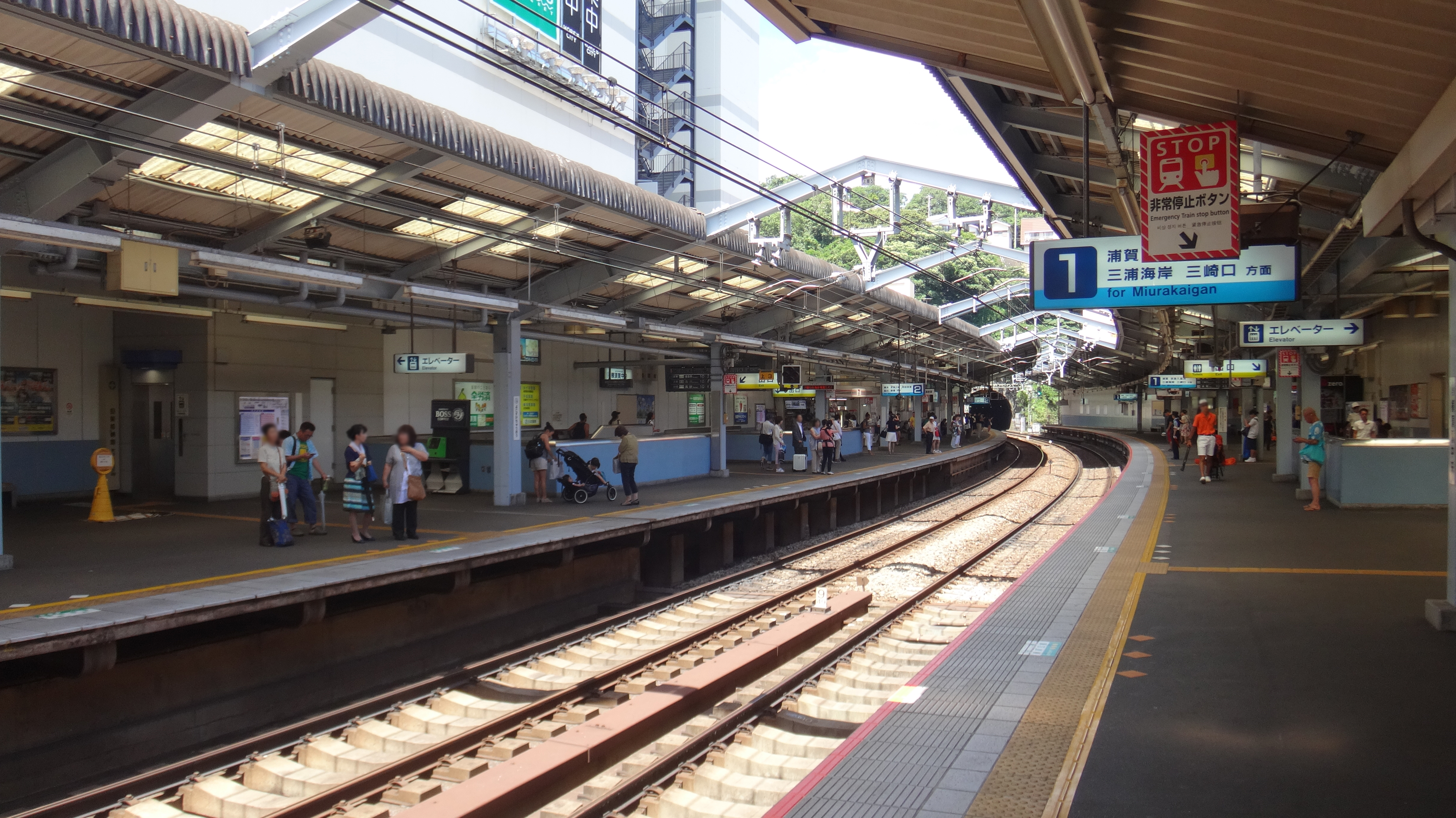
The platforms, July 2015

Yokosuka-chūō Station (横須賀中央駅, Yokosuka-chūō-eki) is a passenger railway station located in the city of Yokosuka, Kanagawa Prefecture, Japan, operated by the private railway company Keikyū.

== Lines ==
Yokosuka-chūō Station is served by the Keikyū Main Line and is located 49.9 kilometers from the northern terminus of the line at Shinagawa Station in Tokyo.

== Station layout ==
The station consists of two elevated opposed side platforms with the station building underneath.

=== Platforms ===
1	■ Keikyū Main Line	for Horinouchi and Uraga; Keikyū Kurihama Line for Keikyū Kurihama and Misakiguchi
2	■ Keikyū Main Line	for Yokohama, Keikyū Kamata, Shinagawa, and Sengakuji; Keikyū Airport Line for Haneda Airport; Toei Asakusa Line for Shimbashi and Oshiage; Keisei Oshiage Line for Aoto; Keisei Main Line for Keisei Funabashi and Narita Airport; Hokuso Line for Shin-Kamagaya and Inba-Nihon-Idai; Narita Sky Access Line for Narita Airport

== History ==
The station opened on 1 April 1930.

Keikyū introduced station numbering to its stations on 21 October 2010; Yokosuka-chūō Station was assigned station number KK59.

== Passenger statistics ==
In fiscal 2019, the station was used by an average of 68,092 passengers daily.

The passenger figures for previous years are as shown below.

Fiscal year	daily average
2005	70,776
2010	68,232
2015	67,278

== Surrounding area ==
- Yokosuka More's
- Port of Yokosuka
- United States Fleet Activities Yokosuka
- Japan National Route 16
- Kanagawa Dental University
- Mikasa Park
- Dobuita Street
- Mikasa Building Shōtengai

== See also ==
- List of railway stations in Japan
