= Sengakuji Station =

Railway and metro station in Tokyo, Japan

Coordinates: 35°38′19.28″N 139°44′24.07″E

Sengakuji Station 泉岳寺駅

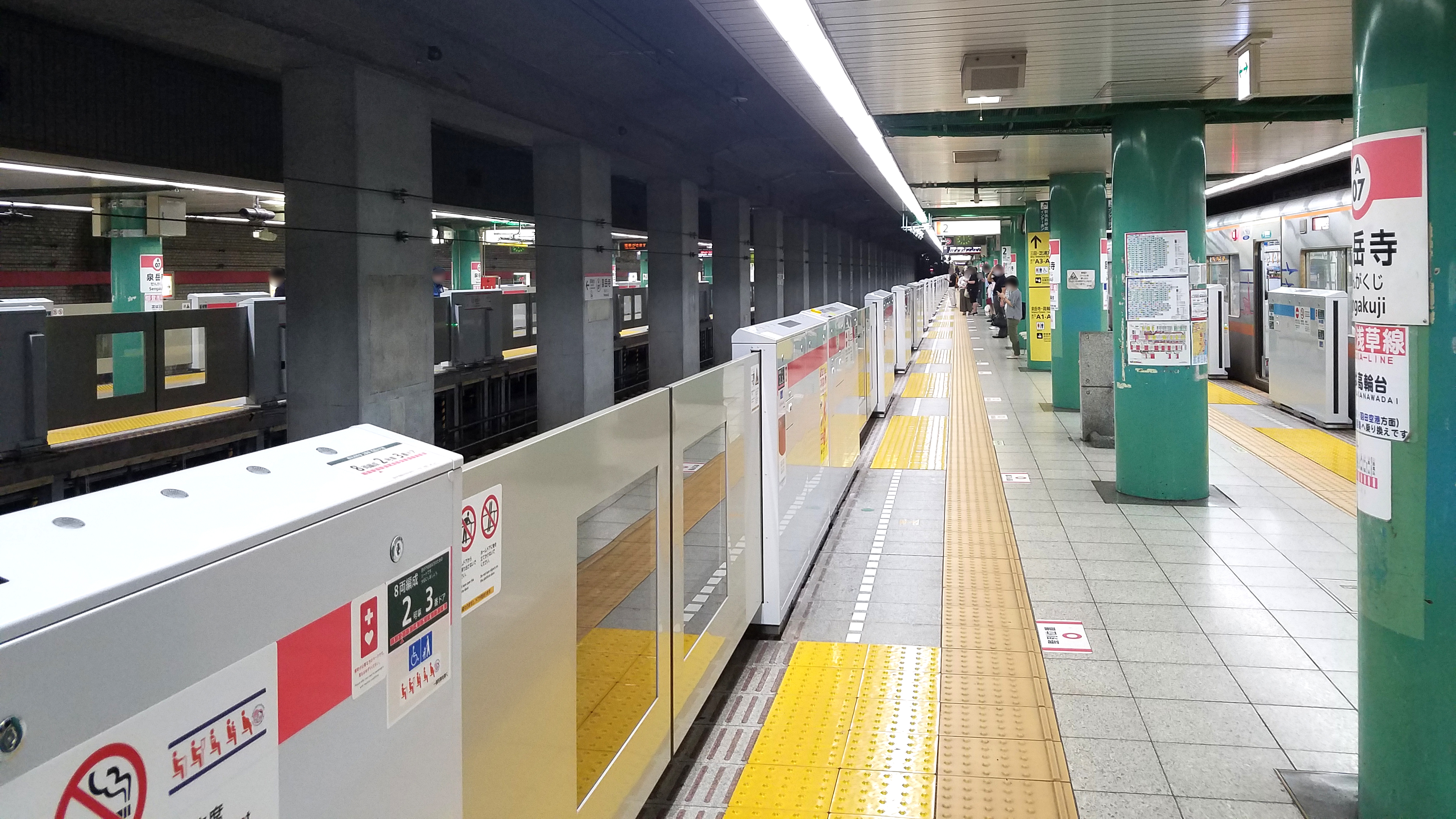
- The platform

General information
- Location: 2-16-34 Takanawa, Minato, Tokyo; Japan
- Operator: Toei Subway (manager); Keikyu
- Lines: Keikyu Main Line; Asakusa Line
- Connections: TGWJK21 JY26 Takanawa Gateway Station

Construction
- Structure type: Underground

Other information
- Station code: A-07

History
- Opened: 21 June 1968; 58 years ago
Services
Preceding station	Keikyu	Following station
Shinagawa One-way operation	Morning Wing	Terminus
Shinagawa KK01 towards Haneda Airport Terminal 1·2	Main Line Airport Limited Express via Airport Line	through to Asakusa Line Line
Shinagawa KK01 towards Horinouchi	Main Line Limited Express (Kaitoku)	through to Asakusa Line Line
Shinagawa KK01 towards Uraga	Main Line Limited Express (Tokkyū)	through to Asakusa Line Line
Shinagawa KK01 towards Keikyū Kamata	Main Line Airport Express (rush hours)	through to Asakusa Line Line
Shinagawa KK01 towards Uraga	Main Line Local	through to Asakusa Line Line
Preceding station	Toei Subway	Following station
through to Keikyu Main Line Line	Asakusa Line Airport Limited Express	Mita towards Oshiage
Takanawadai towards Nishi-magome	Asakusa Line	Mita towards Oshiage
Location
- Location within Tokyo Yamanote Loop Location within Tokyo wards area Location within Japan

Sengakuji Station (泉岳寺駅, Sengakuji-eki) is a railway station in Minato, Tokyo, Japan.

It is entirely owned and operated by the Tokyo Metropolitan Bureau of Transportation, but also serves as the northern terminus of the Keikyu Main Line operated by the private railway operator Keikyu. The station is a major transfer point for passengers on the Toei Asakusa Line because most trains on the Asakusa Line switch to the Keikyu Line past Sengakuji: passengers must usually change trains at Sengakuji to reach Gotanda, Nishi-magome and other stations on the south end of the Asakusa Line. The station is designed with platforms shared between Keikyu and Asakusa Line trains to expedite this connection.

The station is named after Sengaku-ji, a nearby temple famous for housing the graves of the Forty-seven rōnin.

== Lines ==
Sengakuji Station is served by the following lines.

- Toei Asakusa Line (through service to Keisei Oshiage Line, Keisei Higashi-Narita Line and Shibayama Railway Line)
- Keikyu Main Line (through service to Keikyu Airport Line and Keikyu Kurihama Line)

== Station layout ==
1	Keikyu Main Line	for Shinagawa, Haneda Airport (Terminal 3 and Terminal 1·2), Yokohama and Misakiguchi
2	Asakusa Line	for Gotanda and Nishi-magome
3-4	Asakusa Line	for Shimbashi, Nihombashi, and Oshiage; Keisei Main Line for Aoto, Keisei Takasago, Keisei Sakura, Keisei Narita, and Narita Airport (Terminal 2·3 and Terminal 1); Hokusō Line for Imba Nihon-idai; Narita Sky Access Line for Narita Airport; Shibayama Railway Line for Shibayama-Chiyoda

== History ==
The station opened on 21 June 1968.
