= Uraga Station =

Railway station in Yokosuka, Kanagawa Prefecture, Japan

KK64 Uraga Station 浦賀駅
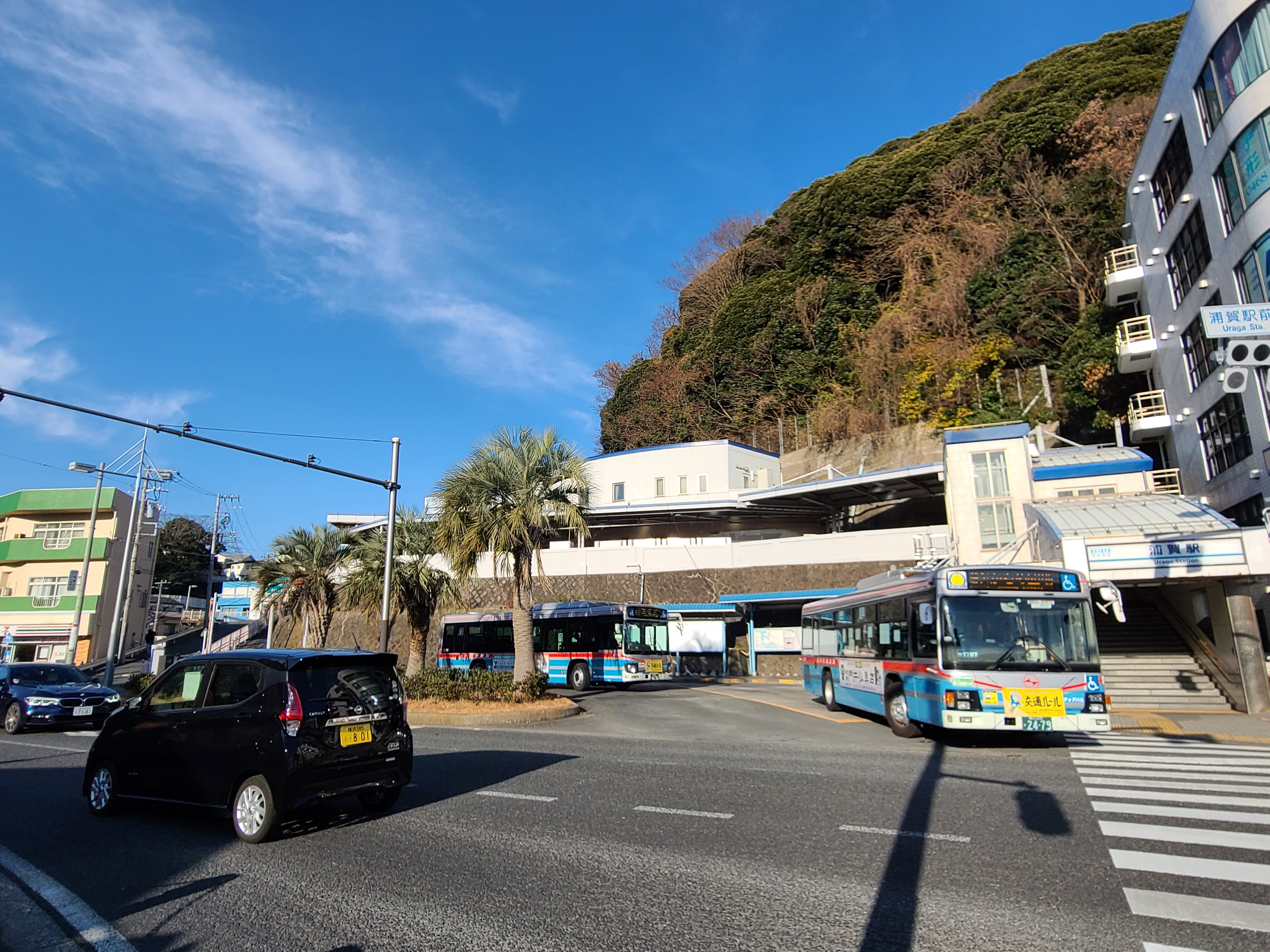
- Uraga Station, January 2021

General information
- Location: 1-1-1 Uraga, Yokosuka-shi, Kanagawa-ken 239-0822; Japan
- Coordinates: 35°15′3.36″N 139°42′54.00″E
- Operator: Keikyū
- Line: Keikyū Main Line
- Distance: 55.5 km from Shinagawa
- Platforms: 1 island platform
- Connections: Bus stop

Other information
- Station code: KK64
- Website: Official website

History
- Opened: April 1, 1930

Passengers
- 2019: 20,199 daily

Services
Preceding station	Keikyu	Following station
Terminus	Main Line Limited Express (Tokkyū) Local	Maborikaigan KK63 towards Sengakuji
Location
- Location within Kanagawa Prefecture Location within Japan

Uraga Station (浦賀駅, Uraga-eki) is a passenger railway station located in the city of Yokosuka, Kanagawa Prefecture, Japan, operated by the private railway company Keikyū.

== Lines ==
Uraga Station is the southern terminus of the Keikyū Main Line and is located 55.5 kilometers from the northern terminus of the line at Shinagawa Station in Tokyo.

== Station layout ==
The station consists of a single elevated dead-headed island platform with the station building underneath.

=== Platforms ===
1/2	■ Keikyū Main Line	for Yokohama, Haneda Airport, Shinagawa, Sengakuji; Toei Asakusa Line for Oshiage

== History ==
Uraga Station opened on April 1, 1930. The current station building was completed in 1957.

Keikyū introduced station numbering to its stations on 21 October 2010; Uraga Station was assigned station number KK64.

== Passenger statistics ==
In fiscal 2019, the station was used by an average of 20,199 passengers daily.

The passenger figures for previous years are as shown below.

Fiscal year	daily average
2005	25,818
2010	23,331
2015	21,750

== Surrounding area ==
- Uraga Port
- Uraga Dock Company
- Yokosuka Museum of Art
- Kannonzaki

== See also ==
- List of railway stations in Japan
