= Koyasu Station =

Railway station in Yokohama, Japan

KK33 Koyasu Station 子安駅
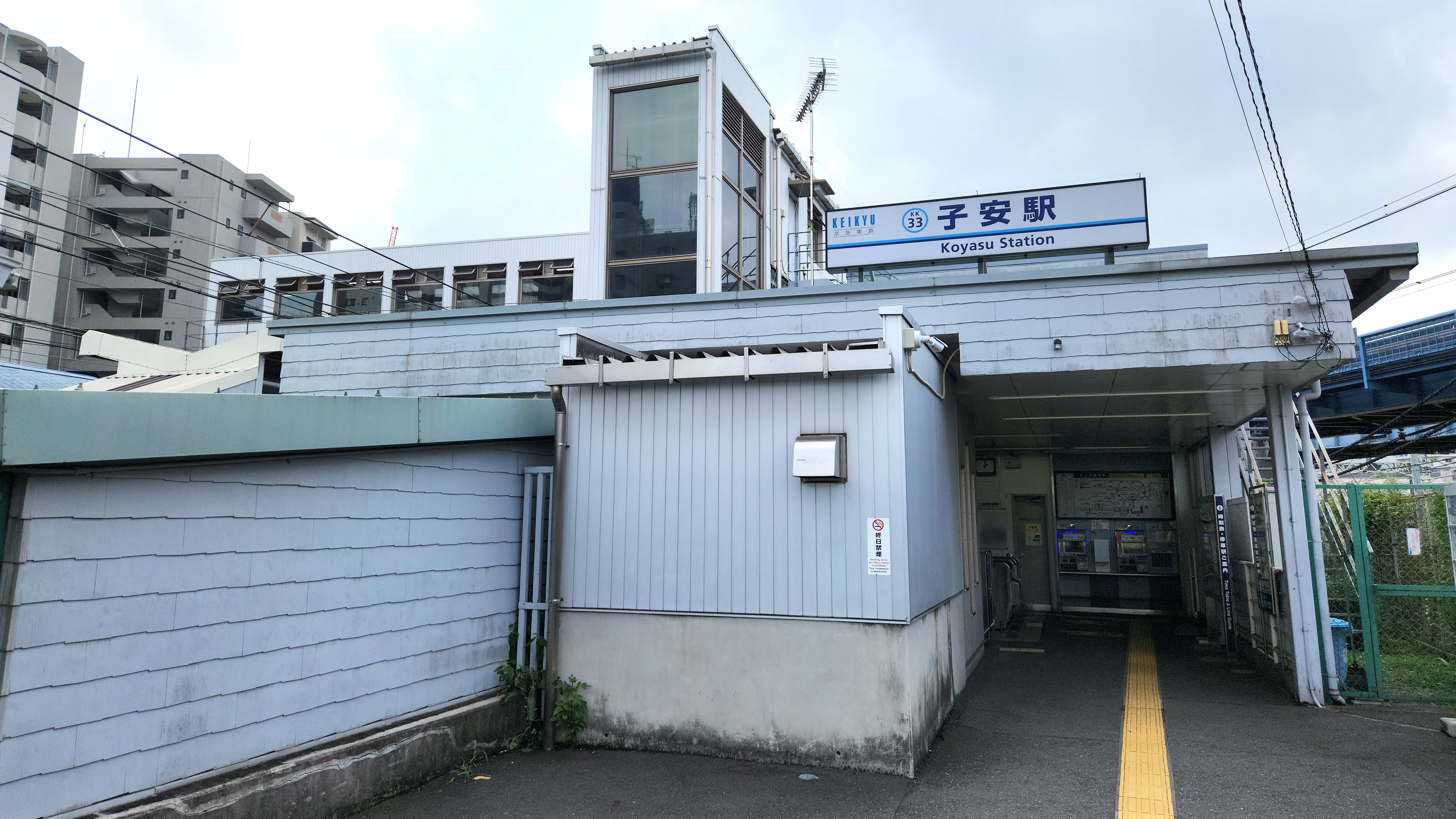
- The entrance in August 2023

General information
- Location: Koyasudori 1-46, Kanagawa-ku, Yokohama-shi, Kanagawa-ken 221-0021; Japan
- Coordinates: 35.4846°N 139.6448°E
- Operator: Keikyū
- Line: Keikyū Main Line
- Distance: 19.3 km from Shinagawa
- Platforms: 2 island platforms
- Connections: Bus stop

Other information
- Station code: KK33
- Website: Official website

History
- Opened: December 24, 1905

Passengers
- 2019: 7,775 daily

Services
Preceding station	Keikyu	Following station
Kanagawa-shimmachi KK34 towards Uraga	Main Line Local	Keikyū Shinkoyasu KK32 towards Shinagawa
Location
- Location within Kanagawa Prefecture Location within Japan

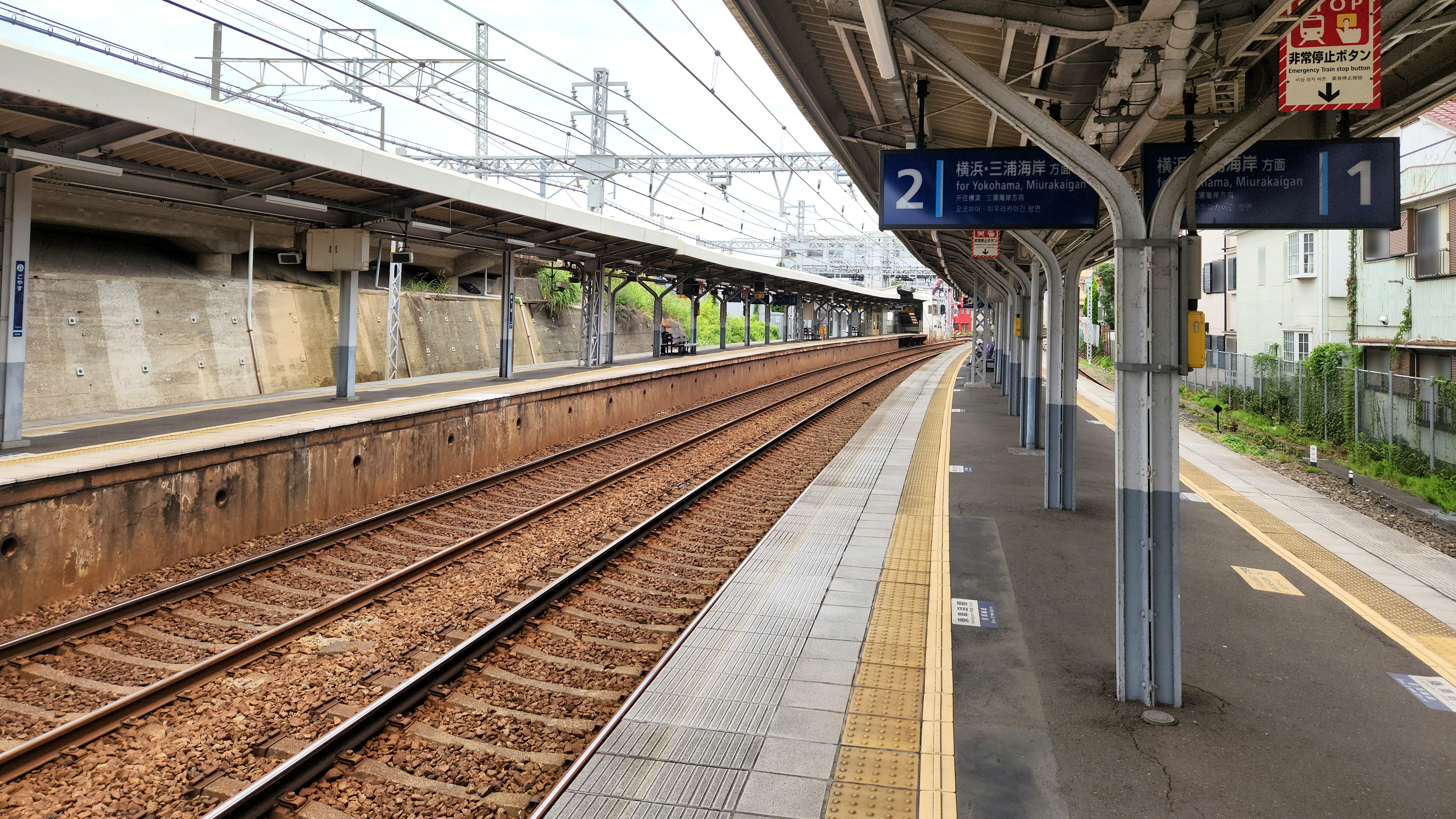
Station platforms in July 2023

Koyasu Station (子安駅, Koyasu-eki) is a passenger railway station located in Kanagawa-ku, Yokohama, Kanagawa Prefecture, Japan, operated by the private railway company Keikyū.

== Lines ==
Koyasu Station is served by the Keikyū Main Line and is located 19.3 kilometers from the terminus of the line at Shinagawa Station in Tokyo.

== Station layout ==
The station consists of two elevated island platforms with the station building underneath.

== Station layout ==
1, 2	■ Keikyū Main Line	for Yokohama, Shinzushi, Uraga and Misakiguchi
3, 4	■ Keikyū Main Line	for Keikyū Kamata, Haneda Airport, and Shinagawa

== History ==
Koyasu Station opened on December 24, 1905. In March 1952, the station was expanded with a second platform.

Keikyū introduced station numbering to its stations on 21 October 2010; Koyasu Station was assigned station number KK33.

== Passenger statistics ==
In fiscal 2019, the station was used by an average of 7,775 passengers daily.

The passenger figures for previous years are as shown below.

Fiscal year	daily average
2005	8,115
2010	8,050
2015	7,686

== Bus services ==
- Koyasu (子安) bus stop (on Route 15)
  - Yokohama Municipal Bus
    - <24>Yokohama West Exit - Kanagawa Police Station mae - Koyasu - Shin-Koyasu - Namamugi
    - <68>Yokohama Sta. mae - Kanagawa Police Station mae - Koyasu - Shin-Koyasu – Namamugi

== Surrounding area ==
- Japan National Route 15
- Ōguchi Station

== See also ==
- List of railway stations in Japan
