= Michizō Tachihara =

Japanese poet

- 立原 道造
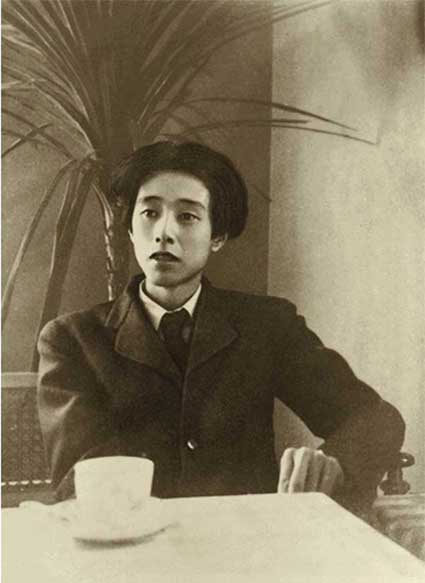
- Michizō Tachihara at age 23
- Born: 30 July 1914; Nihonbashi, Tokyo, Japan
- Died: 29 March 1939 (aged 24); Tokyo, Japan
- Occupations: Poet, architect
- Writing career
- Genre: Poetry

Michizō Tachihara (立原 道造, Tachihara Michizō; 30 July 1914 – 29 March 1939) was a Japanese poet and architect. He died at age 24 from tuberculosis, before either career could seriously get under way. Michizō struggled to find a way for an urban poet to root himself in traditional customs and still be "modern."

Though a citizen of Tokyo, Michizō would rarely mention modern urban scenes in his work. Aside from several references to cars, Michizō chose to describe a vegetable, not a mineral realm. He described trains as vehicles of escape, rescuing him from being cooped up in his architectural office.

The natural landscapes of the Shinano Highlands provided an endless parade of conventional imagery that Michizō would use in his work; such as birds, clouds, flowers, grasses, mountains, skies, trees, and wind. A sizable part of his poetry used poetic impulse, often causing his work to be labelled as "sentimental". He wrote openly about his feelings and expressed what was in his heart, allowing his verse to be both uncontaminated and genuine.

His Dharma name was Onkyōin Shiundō Norikiyo Shinshi (温恭院紫雲道範清信士).

== Education & development ==
Michizō as early on as preschool took an interest drawing, and teachers began to regard him as a child prodigy. In 1927, Michizō entered Morioka Third High School where he joined the Painting Club, which taught him the use of pastel crayons. He also joined the Magazine Club which instructed him in how to submit manuscripts for publication. By 1929 the Alumni Bulletin had printed 11 tanka and some of his drawings would win the silver medal in a student exhibition.

Michizō tested out of the fifth year of high school and directly entered college choosing to study science; which required English. He joined the Literary Club and shifted from using tanka to free verse in his poetry. Michizō also began reading the German poet Rilke as well as French poets Valéry and Baudelaire.

Michizō graduated from First College in 1934 and entered the Imperial University, a three-year course of study, as an architecture major. At the university, he won the annual prize for the best project or design by an architectural undergraduate three years in a row and was also asked by five different literary journals to submit works. Upon graduation, he was hired by Ishimoto Architects; however, he disliked his job where he felt cooped up and creatively hemmed in with no control over his conceptions.

== Tuberculosis ==
By March 1938, Michizō began experiencing exhaustion and a sense of oppression. He also found himself sleeping more often and suffering from a low-grade fever. His doctor ordered rest, yet Michizō set off on a long trip to northern Honshū and Nagasaki. In December 1938 he arrived in Nagasaki exhausted, and admitted himself to a hospital where he began coughing up huge amounts of blood. He returned to Tokyo where doctors ordered continual rest; however, tuberculosis had already begun to affect other vital organs. He entered a Tokyo sanatorium. By 29 March 1939 his illness had completely taken over and he died.
