= Yokosuka Education System =

Yokosuka Education System (横須賀市教育情報センター) is the public school system operated by Yokosuka, Kanagawa Prefecture, Japan.

YES operates elementary schools, junior high schools, and high schools.

== Schools ==
=== Secondary schools ===
==== High schools ====
- Yokosuka Sogo High School

NOTE: Many Yokosuka junior high school students continue at schools operated by the Kanagawa Prefectural Board of Education.

==== Junior high schools ====
- Iriyamazu Junior High School
- Ikegami Junior High School
- Iwato Junior High School
- Kamoi Junior High School
- Kinugasa Junior High School
- Kitashitaura Junior High School
- Kugou Junior High School
- Kurihama Junior High School
- Mabori Junior High School
- Nagai Junior High School
- Nagasawa Junior High School
- Nobi Junior High School
- Ohtsu Junior High School
- Oogusu Junior High School
- Oppama Junior High School
- Ooyabe Junior High School
- Sakamoto Junior High School
- Sakuradai Junior High School
- Shinmei Junior High School
- Takatori Junior High School
- Taura Junior High School
- Takeyama Junior High School
- Tokiwa Junior High School
- Uenodai Junior High School
- Uraga Junior High School

==== Elementary schools ====
- Akehama Elementary School
- Awata Elementary School
- Bouyou Elementary School
- Fujimi Elementary School
- Funakoshi Elementary School
- Hashirimizu Elementary School
- Hemi Elementary School
- Hirasaku Elementary School
- Ikegami Elementary School
- Iwato Elementary School
- Jouhoku Elementary School
- Kamoi Elementary School
- Kinugasa Elementary School
- Kitashitaura Elementary School
- Kouyou Elementary School
- Kouzaka Elementary School
- Kugou Elementary School
- Kurihama Elementary School
- Mabori Elementary School
- Morisaki Elementary School
- Nagai Elementary School
- Nagaura Elementary School
- Natsushima Elementary School
- Negishi Elementary School
- Nobi Elementary School
- Nobihigashi Elementary School
- Obaradai Elementary School
- Oogusu Elementary School
- Ootsu Elementary School
- Ootsukadai Elementary School
- Ooyabe Elementary School
- Oppama Elementary School
- Sakura Elementary School
- Sawayama Elementary School
- Shinmei Elementary School
- Shioiri Elementary School
- Suwa Elementary School
- Takatori Elementary School
- Takeyama Elementary School
- Tado Elementary School
- Taura Elementary School
- Toshima Elementary School
- Tsukui Elementary School
- Tsurukubo Elementary School
- Uraga Elementary School
- Uragou Elementary School
- Yamazaki Elementary School
- Youkou Elementary School
