= Hama Wing =

Coordinates: 35°28′02″N 139°39′08″E

Hama Wing

Hama Wing (ハマウィング, Hama wingu) is the nickname for the Yokohama City Wind Power Plant (横浜市風力発電所, Yokohama-shi Fūryoku hatsudensho), an experimental wind power plant established in Kanagawa-ku, Yokohama, Kanagawa Prefecture, Japan in April 2007.

The wind turbine is a Vestas Wind Systems A/S Model V80-2.0MW with a rotor diameter of 80 metres (260 ft) and a 78 metres (256 ft) tall tower. At the highest point of rotation the turbine is 118 metres (387 ft) tall, higher than the 112.5-metre (369 ft) Cosmo Clock 21 Ferris wheel in Yokohama. The turbine has an output of 1,980 kW (enough power for 860 homes), and its purpose is to publicize environmentally friendly alternative energy sources while providing electricity to the Minato Mirai 21 district.

== Sources ==
- Yokohama, an environmentally friendly city
- https://web.archive.org/web/20081224000854/http://www.city.yokohama.jp/me/kankyou/ondan/furyoku/ Japanese
- City of Yokohama Newsletter

Media related to Hama Wing at Wikimedia Commons
