= Tokyo Metropolitan Road and Kanagawa Prefectural Road Route 2 =

Road in Tokyo and Kanagawa Prefecture, Japan

Tokyo Metropolitan Road and Kanagawa Prefectural Road Route 2 東京都道・神奈川県道2号東京丸子横浜線

Route information
- Length: 20.0 km (12.4 mi)

Major junctions
- From: Nishigotanda, Shinagawa, Tokyo
- To: Kanagawa-ku, Yokohama, Kanagawa

Location
- Country: Japan

Highway system
- National highways of Japan; Expressways of Japan

Tokyo Metropolitan Road and Kanagawa Prefectural Road Route 2 (東京都道・神奈川県道2号東京丸子横浜線, Tōkyōto-dō Kanagawa kendō 2-gō Tōkyō Maruko Yokohama-sen) is a principle local road that stretches from Nishigotanda, Shinagawa in Tokyo to Kanagawa-ku, Yokohama in Kanagawa. With the Marukobashi intersection as the boundary, the direction of Gotanda is commonly called the Nakahara Highway, and the direction of Tsunashima is known as the Tsunashima Highway (つなしま かいど, Tsunashina kaido).

== Route description ==
Tsunashina Kaido has a total length of 20.0 kilometers (12.4 mi). The Tokyo, Kawasaki and Yokohama sections of the road have a length of 7,210, 3,276, and 9,540 m respectively.
