= Kagetsu-sōjiji Station =

Railway station in Yokohama, Japan

KK30 Kagetsu-sōjiji Station 花月総持寺駅
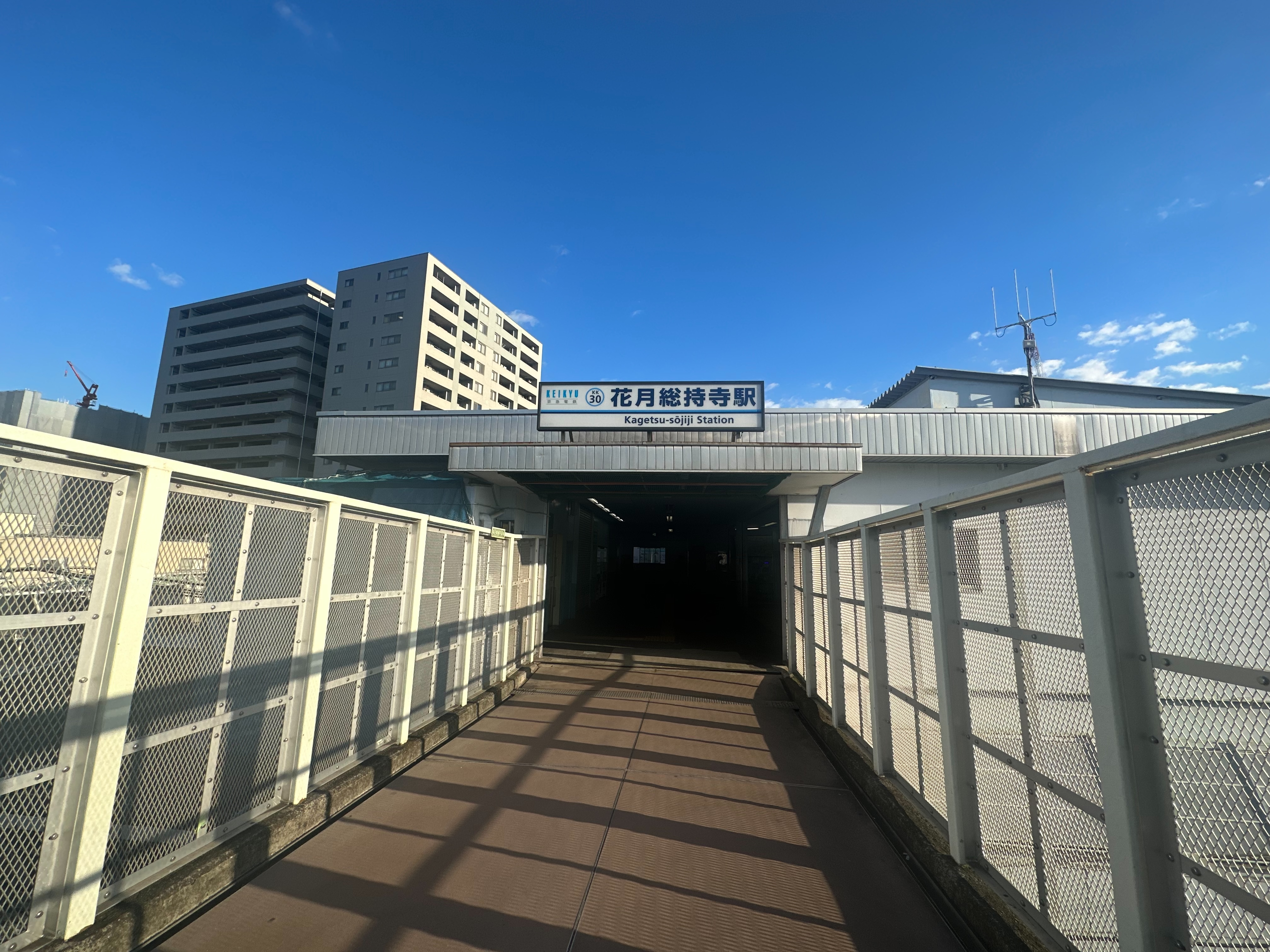
- Kagetsu-sōjiji Station entrance, November 2023

General information
- Location: Namamugi 5-chōme, Tsurumi-ku, Yokohama-shi, Kanagawa-ken 230-0052; Japan
- Coordinates: 35°30′01.49″N 139°40′22.84″E
- Operator: Keikyū
- Line: Keikyū Main Line
- Distance: 15.1 km (9.4 mi) from Shinagawa
- Platforms: 2 side platforms
- Connections: Bus stop

Other information
- Station code: KK30
- Website: Official website

History
- Opened: April 12, 1914
- Former names: Kagetsuen-mae Station

Passengers
- 2019: 7,022 daily

Services
Preceding station	Keikyu	Following station
Namamugi KK31 towards Uraga	Main Line Local	Keikyū Tsurumi KK29 towards Shinagawa
Location
- Location within Kanagawa Prefecture Location within Japan

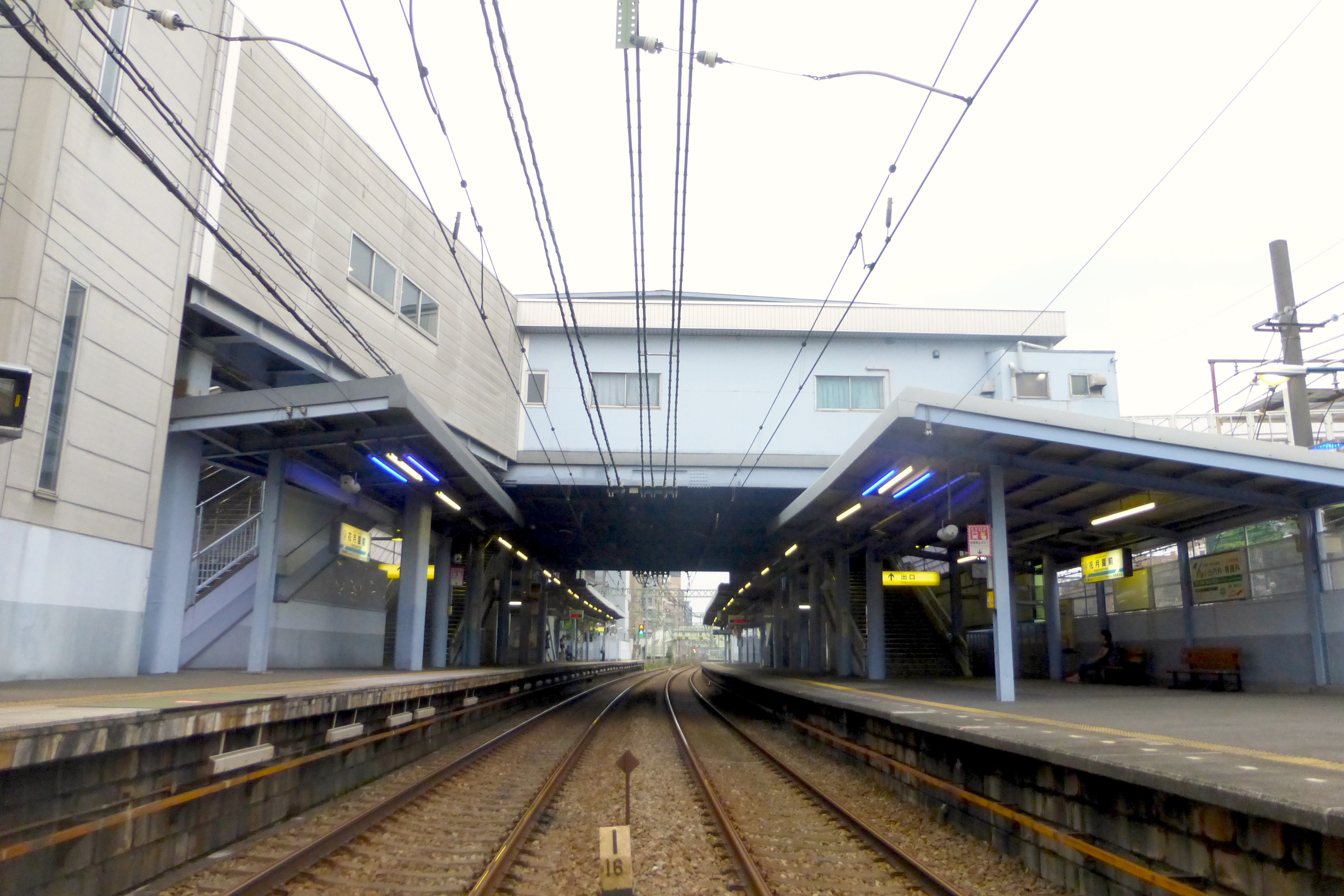
Station platforms, June 2015

Kagetsu-sōjiji Station (花月総持寺駅, Kagetsu-sōjiji-eki) is a passenger railway station located in Tsurumi-ku, Yokohama, Kanagawa Prefecture, Japan, operated by the private railway company Keikyū.

== Lines ==
Kagetsu-sōjiji Station is served by the Keikyū Main Line and is located 15.1 kilometers (9.4 mi) from the terminus of the line at Shinagawa Station in Tokyo.

== Station layout ==
The station consists of two ground-level opposed side platforms connected by an elevated station building built over the platforms and tracks.

1	■ Keikyū Main Line	for Yokohama, Zushi·Hayama, Uraga, Misakiguchi
2	■ Keikyū Main Line	for Keikyū Kamata, Haneda Airport, and Shinagawa

== History ==
Kagetsu-sōjiji Station opened on 12 April 1914. The station was rebuilt as an elevated station in December 1971.

The station was originally named for the adjacent Kagetsuen Amusement Park, which was in operation from 1914 until 1946. The amusement park property was later used for the Kagetsuen Keirin Stadium, which closed down in March 2010.

Keikyū introduced station numbering to its stations on 21 October 2010; Kagetsu-sōjiji Station was assigned station number KK30.

Kagetsu-sōjiji was renamed from Kagetsuen-mae (花月園前駅, Kagetsuen-mae-eki) on 14 March 2020. The name reflects the redevelopment of Kagetsuen following the closure of the Keirin track, as well as the nearby Sōji-ji Buddhist temple.

== Passenger statistics ==
In fiscal 2019, the station was used by an average of 7,022 passengers daily.

The passenger figures for previous years are as shown below.

Fiscal year	daily average
2005	8,128
2010	6,310
2015	16,342

== Surrounding area ==
- Sōji-ji
- Kokudo Station
- Japan National Route 15
- Yokohama City Yokohama Science Frontier High School / Affiliated Junior High School

== See also ==
- List of railway stations in Japan
