= Leonardtown High School =

Coordinates: 38°16′19.61″N 76°36′35.94″W

- Leonardtown, Maryland; United States

Information
- Type: Public Secondary
- Motto: Stay raider STRONG
- Established: 1978
- School district: St. Mary's County Public Schools
- Principal: James Copsey III
- Grades: 9–12
- Enrollment: 1846 (2022–2023)
- Campus: Rural
- Colors: Blue and White
- Athletics: Southern Maryland Athletic Conference
- Mascot: Ospreagles
- Website: schools.smcps.org/lhs

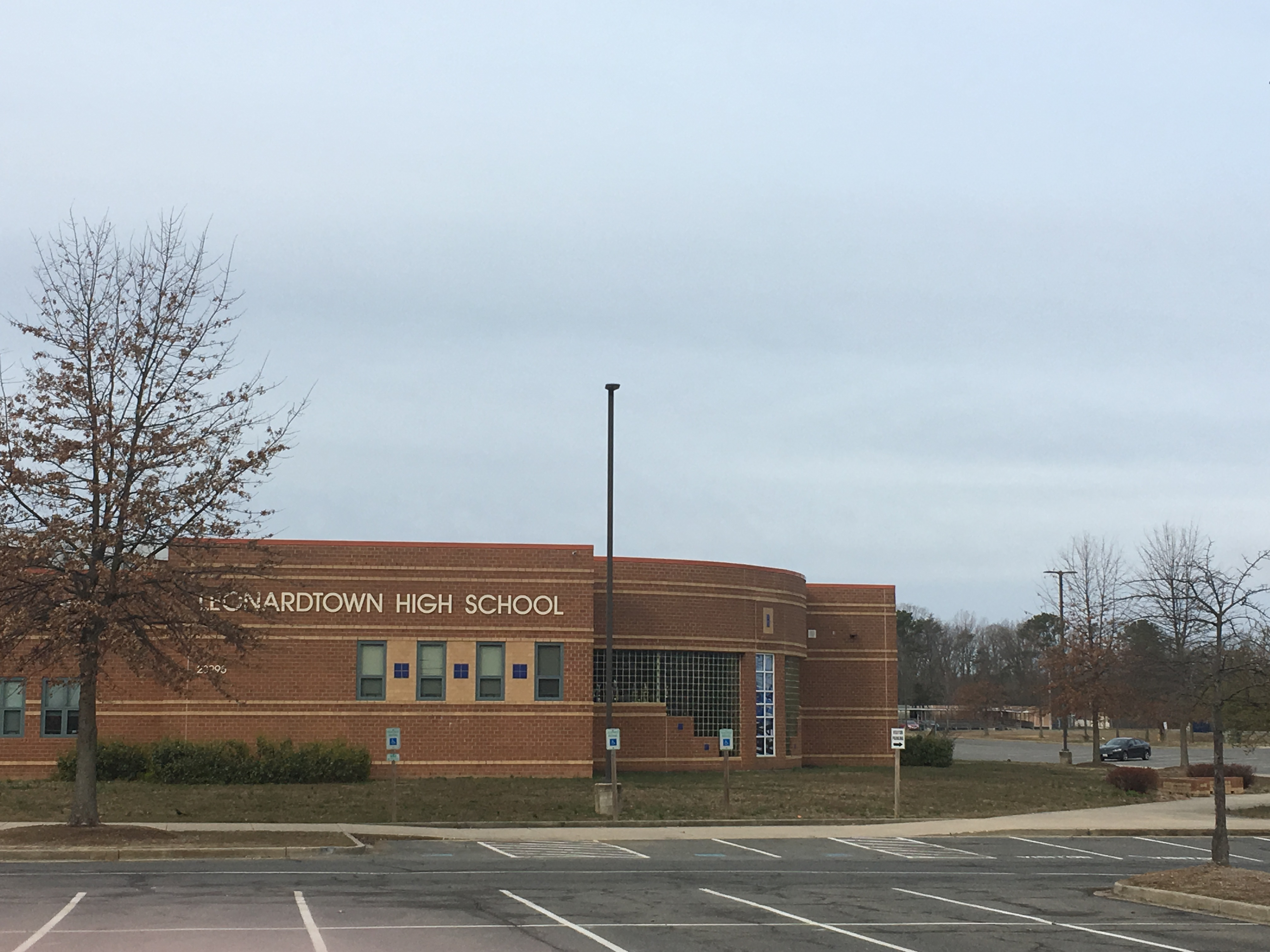
Picture of Leonardtown high school

Leonardtown High School is a comprehensive public high school in Leonardtown, Maryland, United States, for students in grades 9–12. It offers college preparatory programs and programs that prepare students for business and technical occupations. It serves the community in the central portion of St. Mary's County, Maryland, between the Potomac River and Patuxent River. The area is a mixture of rural and suburban communities. Many of the families are employed by NAS Patuxent River, government contractors, St. Mary's College of Maryland, St Mary's County government and others involved in the traditional agriculture and water related businesses.

Leonardtown High School is accredited by the Middle States Association of Colleges and Secondary Schools and the Maryland State Department of Education.

Leonardtown High School Athletics belongs to the Southern Maryland Athletic Conference and competes in Division 4A in the state competitions force.

On May 24, 2024, the No. 6 seeded Leonardtown Raiders Varsity Baseball Team defeated the No. 1 seeded Walt Whitman Vikings 2-0 at Regency Furniture Stadium to claim the MPSSAA Class 4A Baseball State Championship.

On May 25, 2024 the Leonardtown softball team won the MPSSAA Class 4A Softball State Championship, beating Eleanor Roosevelt High School by a score of 14-0 at the University of Maryland.

According to Public School Review, as of 2022, Leonardtown High School is ranked #45 out of 1,343 schools, which ranks it among the top 5% of public schools in Maryland.

== 2025 Senior Prank ==
On May 16, 2025 administrators arrived to find the school vandalized. According to Principal Jamie Copsey, security video shows several masked individuals roaming the building. The masked individuals left paint splattered on walls, oil dumped down stairwells, peanut butter smeared on doors and lockers, and live chickens released inside the school.

== Notable alumni ==
- Heather Cooke - Graduated in 2006 and was a cast member on the MTV2 series The Real World
- Jamie Gillan - Graduated in 2015 and former punter for the Cleveland Browns and current punter for the New York Giants

== Sister school ==
Kanagawa Prefectural Hibarigaoka High School in Japan became the sister school of Leonardtown High in October 1991, when the county board of education and representatives from Maryland formalized an agreement.

== See also ==
- St. Mary's County Public Schools
