= Kanagawa-ku =

Kanagawa 神奈川区
- Ward
- Kanagawa Ward
- Flag

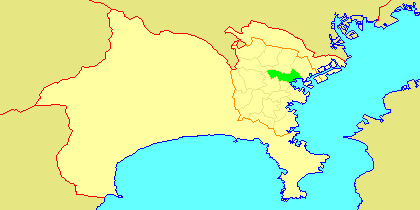
- Location of Kanagawa in Kanagawa

- Kanagawa (Japan)
- Coordinates: 35°28′37″N 139°37′46″E
- Country: Japan
- Region: Kantō
- Prefecture: Kanagawa
- City: Yokohama

Area
  - Total: 23.88 km^{2} (9.22 sq mi)

Population (February 2010)
  - Total: 230,401
  - Density: 9,650/km^{2} (25,000/sq mi)
- Time zone: UTC+9 (Japan Standard Time)
- Tree: Magnolia kobus
- Flower: Tulip
- Address: 3-8 Hirodaiota-chō, Kanagawa-ku Yokohama-shi, Kanagawa-ken; 221-0824
- Website: Kanagawa Ward Office

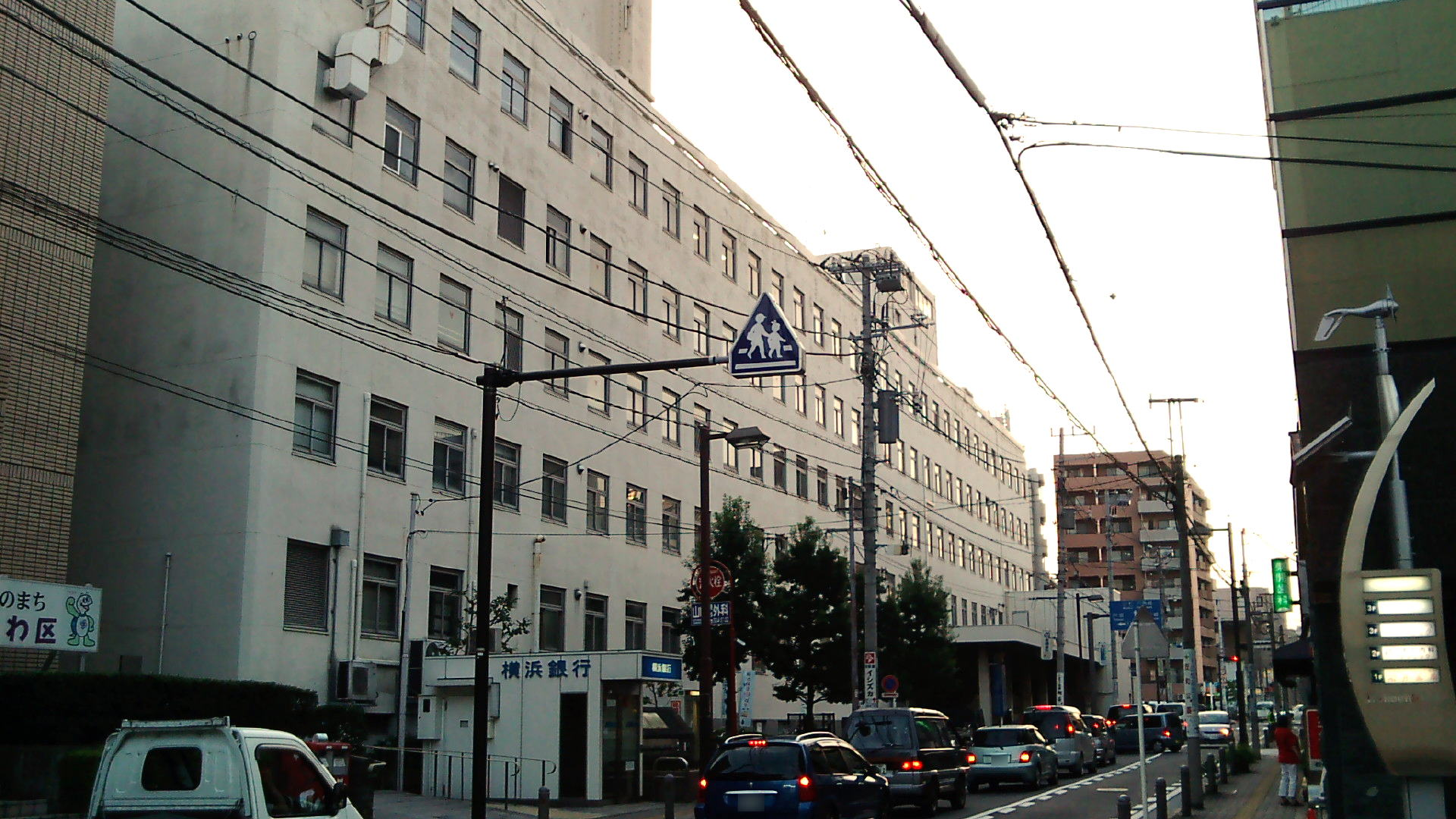
Kanagawa Ward Office

Kanagawa-ku (神奈川区) is one of the 18 wards of the city of Yokohama in Kanagawa Prefecture, Japan. As of 2010, the ward had an estimated population of 230,401 and a density of 9,650 persons per km^{2}. The total area was 23.88 km^{2}.

== Geography ==
Kanagawa is located in eastern Kanagawa Prefecture, and northeast of the geographic center of the city of Yokohama.

=== Surrounding municipalities ===
- Tsurumi Ward
- Nishi Ward
- Kōhoku Ward
- Midori Ward
- Hodogaya Ward

== History ==
Under the Nara period Ritsuryō system, the area that is now Kanagawa Ward became part of Tachibana District in Musashi Province. During the Edo period, the area was tenryō territory controlled directly by the Tokugawa shogunate, but administered through various hatamoto. The area prospered in the Edo period as Kanagawa-juku, a post station on the Tōkaidō connecting Edo with Kyoto. During the Bakumatsu period, Kanagawa was the location of the signing of the Convention of Kanagawa, which ended Japan’s national isolation policy and led to the normalization of diplomatic relations between the United States and Japan. The subsequent Treaty of Amity and Commerce (United States–Japan) led to the establishment of a treaty port for foreign commerce and settlement, which was initially stipulated to be Kanagawa. However, for security reasons, the actual settlement was established at neighboring Yokohama (present day Naka Ward). The Namamugi Incident, which led to the 1863 Anglo-Satsuma War, occurred in Kanagawa.

After the Meiji Restoration, the area was transferred to the new Kanagawa Prefecture in 1868. Kanagawa was connected to Yokohama and Tokyo by train in 1872, and was proclaimed a town on April 1, 1889. On April 1, 1901, it was absorbed into neighboring Yokohama. Kanagawa suffered severe damage from the 1923 Great Kantō earthquake. On October 1, 1927, it became Kanagawa Ward within the city of Yokohama. The area again destroyed during World War II, first being bombed during the Doolittle Raid of 1942, and finally being completely devastated during the massive Yokohama air raid of May 29, 1945. Kanagawa Ward soon rebuilt after the end of the war, although large portions of its territory remained under the control of the United States military until the 1970s.

== Economy ==
Kanagawa Ward is a regional commercial center and bedroom community for central Yokohama and Tokyo. The coastal area is part of the Keihin Industrial Zone, and is the most industrialized region within Yokohama. Major factories are operated by Nissan, JVC, Nippon Petroleum Refining Co., Ltd., Nippon Flour Mills, Showa Denko, Asahi Glass Co. Mazda has a research and development center in Kanagawa-ku.

== Transportation ==
=== Railroads ===
- East Japan Railway Company –Yokohama Line
  - Higashi-Kanagawa – Ōguchi
- East Japan Railway Company - Keihin-Tōhoku Line
  - Higashi-Kanagawa – Shin-Koyasu
- Keihin Electric Express Railway - Keikyū Main Line
  - Keikyū Shinkoyasu - Koyasu - Kanagawa-Shinmachi - Naka-Kido - Kanagawa
- Tokyu Corporation - Tōkyū Tōyoko Line
  - Hakuraku - Higashi-Hakuraku - Tammachi
- Yokohama City Transportation Bureau – Blue Line
  - Katakurachō –Mitsuzawa-kamichō –Mitsuzawa-shimochō

=== Highways ===
- Daisan Keihin
- Shuto Expressway
- Route 1
- Route 15

==== Prefecture roads ====
- Kanagawa Prefecture Road 2
- Kanagawa Prefecture Road 21
- Kanagawa Prefecture Road 13
- Kanagawa Prefecture Road 111

== Education ==
=== Colleges and universities ===
- Kanagawa University
- Institute of Information Security

=== Primary and secondary schools ===
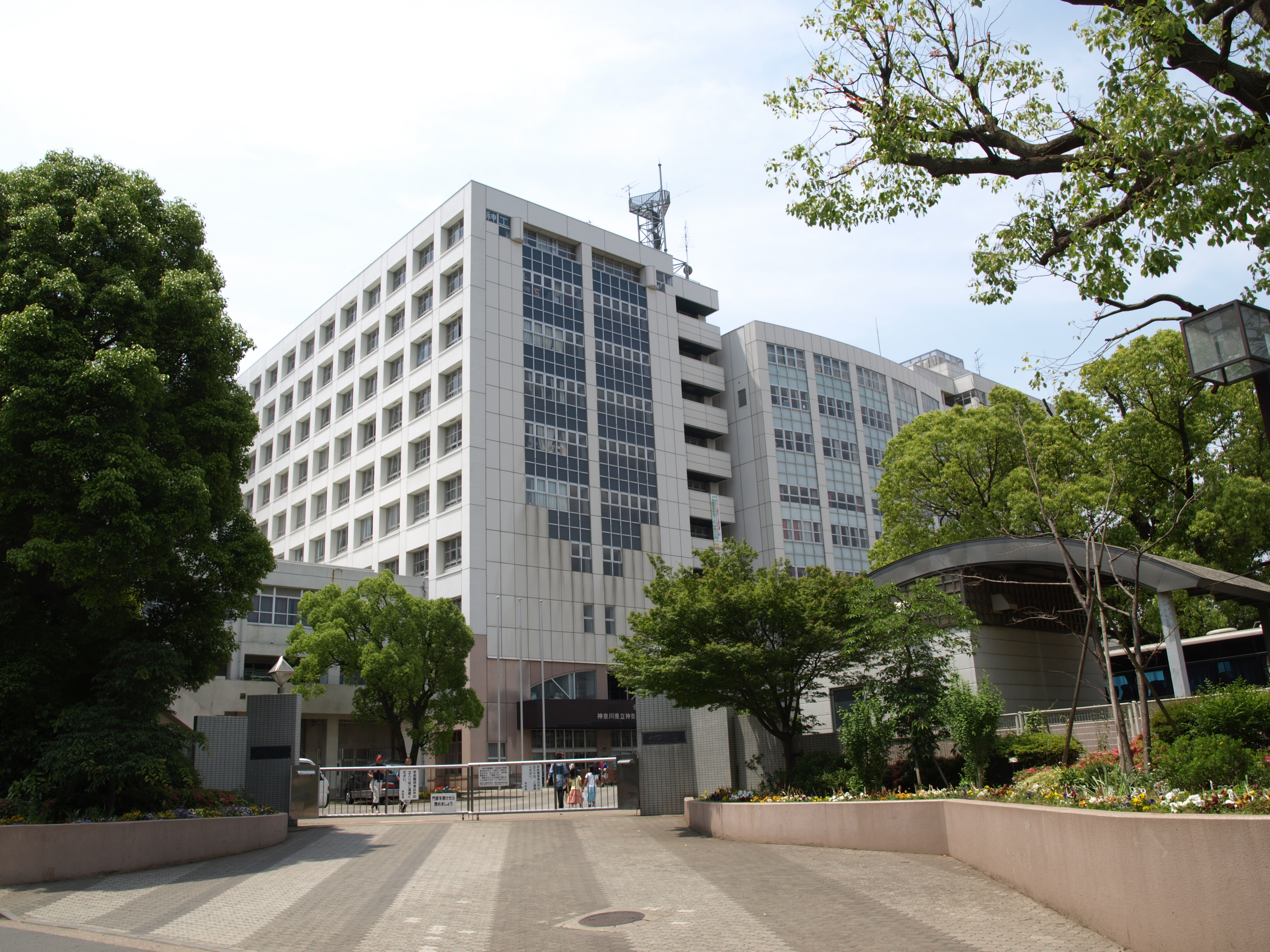
Kanagawa Sohgoh High School

The Kanagawa Prefectural Board of Education operates prefectural high schools. Public senior high schools:

- Yokohama Suiran High School
- Kanagawa Sohgoh High School
- Kanagawa Technical High School
- Shirosato High School

The Yokohama Municipal Board of Education operates public elementary and junior high schools.

Public junior high schools:

- Kanagawa (神奈川)
- Kuritaya (栗田谷)
- Matsumoto (松本)
- Nishikidai (錦台)
- Rokkakubashi (六角橋)
- Sugeta (菅田)
- Urashimaoka (浦島丘)

Additionally, Karuisawa Junior High School (軽井沢中学校), outside of Kanagawa-ku, serves a part of Kanagawa-ku.

Public elementary schools:

- Aoki (青木)
- Futatsuya (二谷)
- Hazawa (羽沢)
- Kamihashi (神橋)
- Kanagawa (神奈川)
- Kandaiji (神大寺)
- Kōgaya (幸ケ谷)
- Koyasu (子安)
- Minami-Kandaiji (南神大寺)
- Mitsuzawa (三ツ沢)
- Nakamaru (中丸)
- Nishiterao (西寺尾)
- Nishiterao-Daini (No. 2) (西寺尾第二)
- Ōguchidai (大口台)
- Saitobun (斎藤分)
- Shirahata (白幡)
- Sugetanooka (菅田の丘)
- Urashima (浦島)

Additionally the zones of Higashi Hongo Elementary School (東本郷小学校), Kamihoshikawa Elementary (上星川小学校), Kohoku Elementary (港北小学校), Miyagaya Elementary (宮谷小学校), Shirosato Elementary (城郷小学校), Terao Elementary (寺尾小学校), and Tokiwadai Elementary (常盤台小学校), all with campuses located outside of Kanagawa-ku, include portions of Kanagawa-ku.

Municipal special schools:

- Yokohama Municipal Special Needs School for the Blind (横浜市立盲特別支援学校)

Former municipal schools:

- Ikeue (池上) and Sugeta (菅田) Elementaries merged into Sugetanooka on April 1, 2021 (Reiwa 3).

International schools:

- Kanagawa Korean Jr./ Sr. High School – North Korean school
- Yokohama Korean Primary School (横浜朝鮮初級学校) - Also a North Korean school – Kindergarten and primary school Private Schools:

Private schools:

- Asano High School

== Local attractions ==
- Hama Wing
- Mitsuzawa Stadium

== Noted people from Kanagawa Ward ==
- Hiroshi Abe, actor
- Tetsurō Degawa, comedian
- Tomomi Itano, ex-AKB48
- Keiko Kishi, actress
- Akinori Ogata, racing driver
- Kaori Takahashi, actress
- Junichi Tazawa, professional baseball player
- Tetsuya Yamaguchi, professional baseball player
