= Kanagawa Prefectural Board of Education =

Board of education for Kanagawa Prefecture, Japan

The Kanagawa Prefectural Board of Education (神奈川県教育委員会) is a board of education serving the Kanagawa Prefecture in Japan. The board consists of six members; one of whom is elected as the chair, and one being appointed by the board as a superintendent. The board administers municipal education and directly operates all of the prefectural schools.

== Schools operated by the Kanagawa Prefectural Board of Education ==
=== Cities designated by government ordinance of Japan in Kanagawa Prefecture ===
Yokohama (capital city)

Aoba-ku

- Ichigao Senior High School
- Motoishikawa Senior High School
- Tana High School

Asahi-ku

- Asahi High School
- Futamatagawa Nursing And Welfare Senior High School
- Kibogaoka High School
- Yokohama Kyokuryō High School

Hodogaya-ku

- Hodogaya High School
- Kōryō High School
- Shōkō High School

Isogo-ku

- Hitorizawa High School
- Isogo High School
- Isogo Technical High School

Izumi-ku

- Shoyo High School
- Yokohama Ryokuen High School (formerly Ryokuen Sogo)
- Yokohama Syuyukan High School

Kanagawa-ku

- Kanagawa Sohgoh High School
- Kanagawa Technical High School
- Shirosato High School
- Yokohama Suiran High School

Kanazawa-ku

- Kanazawa Sogo High School
- Kamariya High School

Kohoku-ku

- Kishine High School
- Kohoku High School
- Nippa High School

Konan-ku

- Nagaya High School
- Yokohama Meihō High School
- Yokohama Nanryō High School

Midori-ku

- Hakusan High School
- Kirigaoka High School

Minami-ku

- Seiryo High School
- Yokohama High School of International Studies

Naka-ku

- Yokohama-Midorigaoka Senior High School
- Yokohama-Tateno Senior High School

Nishi-ku

- Kanagawa Prefectural Yokohama Hiranuma High School

Sakae-ku

- Kanagawa Prefectural Hakuyo High School
- Kanai High School
- Yokohama Sakae High School

Seya-ku

- Seya High School
- Seya West High School

Totsuka-ku

- Kamiyabe High School
- Maioka High School
- Yokohama Oyo High School

Tsurumi-ku

- Tsurumi High School
- Tsurumi Sogo High School

Tsuzuki-ku

- Eda High School
- Kawawa High School
- Shin-ei High School

Kawasaki

Asao-ku

- Asao High School
- Asaosogo High School
- Daishi High School

Kawasaki-ku

- Daishi High School
- Kawasaki High School

Miyamae-ku

- Kawasaki North High School

Nakahara-ku

- Shinjo High School
- Sumiyoshi High School
- Kawasaki Technical High School

Tama-ku

- Ikuta High School
- Ikuta East High School
- Mukainooka Technical High School
- Suge High School
- Kanagawa Prefectural Tama High School
- Yurigaoka High School

Sagamihara

Chuo-ku

- Kamimizo High School
- Kamimizo South High School
- Sagamihara High School
- Sagamitana High School
- Sagamihara Yaei High School

Midori-ku

- Aihara High School
- Hashimoto High School
- Sagamihara Sogo High School
- Tsukui High School
- Shiroyama High School

Minami-ku

- Asamizodai High School
- Kamitsuruma High School
- Kanagawa Sogo Sangyo High School
- Sagamihara Seiryo High School
- Kanagawa Prefectural Sagamihara Secondary Education School

=== Other municipalities in Kanagawa Prefecture ===
Aikawa

- Aikawa High School ()

Atsugi

- Atsugi Commercial High School
- Atsugi East High School
- Atsugi High School
- Atsugi North High School
- Atsugi Seinan High School
- Atsugi West High School

Ayase

- Ayase High School
- Ayase West High School

Chigasaki

- Chigasaki High School
- Chigasaki Hokuryo High School
- Chigasaki Nishihama High School
- Tsurumine High School

Ebina

- Arima High School
- Central Agricultural High School
- Ebina High School

Fujisawa

- Fujisawa Seiryu High School
- Fujisawa Sogo High School
- Fujisawa Technical High School
- Fujisawa West High School
- Shonandai High School
- Shonan High School

Hadano

- Hadano High School
- Hadano Sogo High School
- Hadano Soya High School

Hiratsuka

- Hiratsuka Agricultural High School
- Hiratsuka Commercial High School
- Hiratsuka High School of Science & Technology
- Kanagawa Prefectural Hiratsuka Konan High School
- Kanagawa Prefectural Hiratsuka Secondary Education School
- Hiratsuka Shofu High School
- Takahama High School

Isehara

- Isehara High School
- Ishida High School

Kaisei

- Yoshidajima Sogo High School

Kamakura

- Fukasawa High School
- Kamakura High School
- Ofuna High School
- Shichirigahama High School

Minamiashigara

- Ashigara High School

Miura

- Hiratsuka Agricultural High School Hasse Branch
- Miura Rinkai High School

Ninomiya

- Ninomiya High School

Odawara

- Kanagawa Prefectural Odawara High School
- Odawara Johoku Technical High School
- Odawara Sogo Business
- Seisho High School

Oi

- Oi High School

Oiso

- Oiso High School

Samukawa

- Samukawa High School

Shiroyama

- Shiroyama High School

Yamakita

- Yamakita High School

Yamato

- Yamato East High School
- Yamato High School
- Yamato South High School
- Yamato West High School

Yokosuka

- Marine Science High School
- Ogusu High School
- Oppama High School
- Tsukuihama High School
- Yokosuka High School
- Yokosuka Meikou High School
- Yokosuka Otsu High School
- Yokosuka Technical High School

Zama

- Sagami Koyokan High School
- Zama High School
- Zama Sogo High School

Zushi

- Zushi High School
- Zuyo High School

== Former schools ==
- Kanagawa Prefectural Hibarigaoka High School

== See also ==
- Education in Japan
- Secondary education in Japan
- Tokyo Metropolitan Government Board of Education
- Osaka Prefectural Board of Education
- Hokkaidō Prefectural Board of Education
- Chiba Prefectural Board of Education
- Okinawa Prefectural Board of Education
- Iwate Prefectural Board of Education
- Ehime Prefectural Board of Education
