= Morioka First High School =

Coordinates: 39°42′48.4″N 141°8′30.7″E

- 盛岡第一高等学校

Location
- 3-2-1 Ueda, Morioka-shi Iwate-ken, Japan; Morioka; Japan

Information
- Type: Public senior high school
- Motto: 忠實自彊・質実剛健
- Established: May 13, 1880
- Principal: Hiiraga Shinji
- Grades: 10-12
- Gender: co-educational
- Enrollment: 939
- Campus: Urban
- Color: White
- Website: www2.iwate-ed.jp/mo1-h/
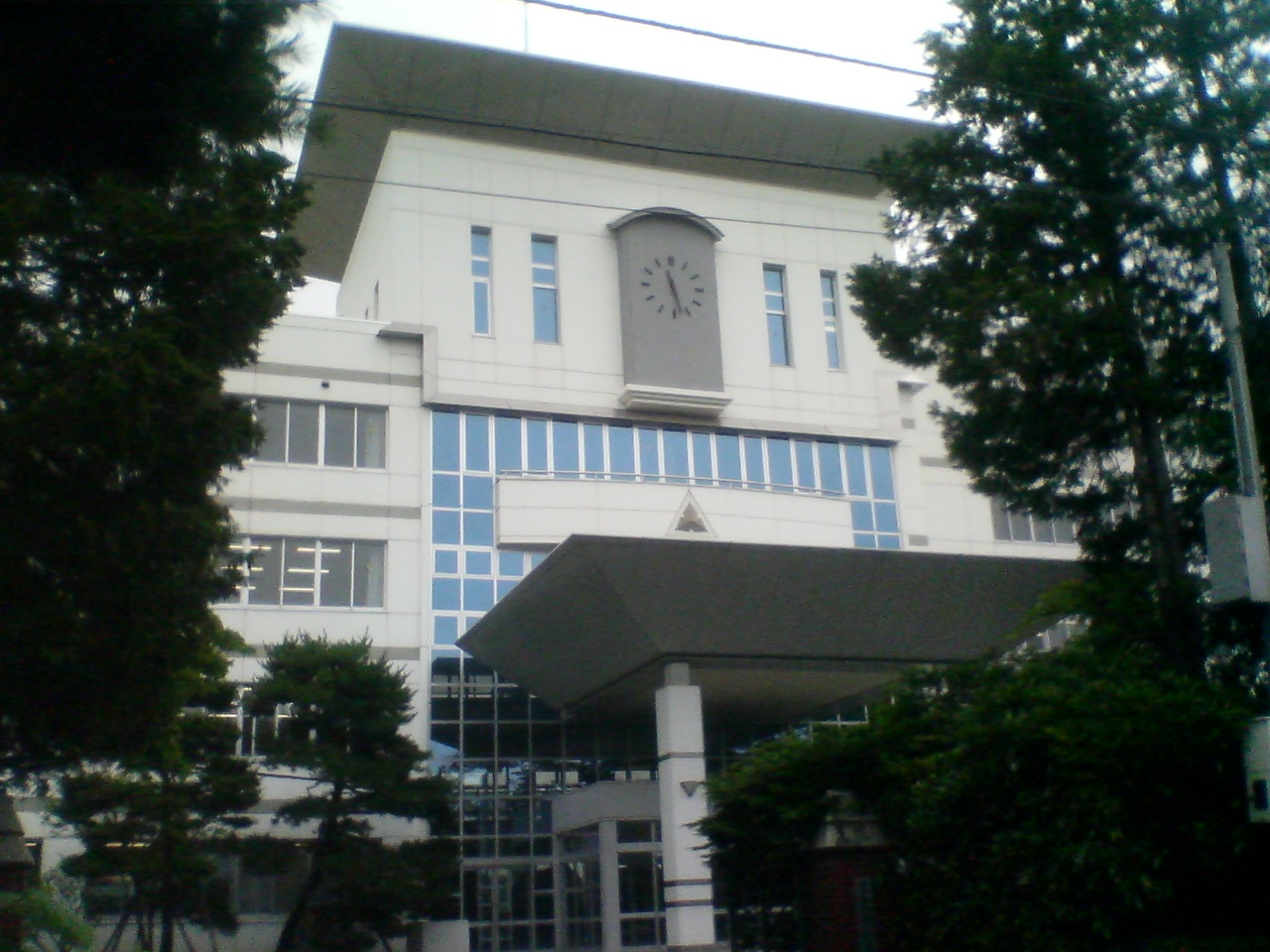
- Main building

Iwate Prefectural Morioka First High School (岩手県立盛岡第一高等学校, Iwate-kenritsu Morioka Dai-ichi Kōtōgakkō), often abbreviated as Morioka Ichikō (盛岡一高), is a public university preparatory high school in Morioka, Iwate, Japan. Founded in 1880, Morioka Ichikō is the second oldest high school in Iwate Prefecture and one of the oldest in Japan. As of March 2008, it has 939 enrolled students.

Its logo stands for pine needles; each needle represents truth, virtue, and a heart of gold.

== Motto ==
- Faithfulness, effort (忠實自彊, Chujitsu Jikyō)
- Sturdiness (質実剛健, Shitsujitsu Gōken)

== Courses ==
- General Course, full-time
- Science and Mathematics Course, full-time

== Club activities ==
Kyūdō, kendo, baseball, football, judo, swimming, skiing, tennis, soft tennis, table tennis, climbing, basketball, badminton, volleyball, handball, rugby, track and field, softball, igo, shogi, drama, chorus, chemistry, sadō, kadō, photography, calligraphy, newspaper, wind orchestra, biology, astronomy, fine arts, geography, literature, amateur radio, anime, simulation, dance

=== Student activities ===
cheering, broadcasting, annual bulletin, student government

== Access ==
- 18-minute walk from Morioka Station
- 5-minute walk from Kami-Morioka Station

== Academic calendar ==
April

- Freshman Orientation
- Cheering Practice
- Entrance ceremony

May

- Athletic Festival

June

- Ball Game Festival

July

- Cheering Practice (specifically for High school baseball in Japan)

September

- School Festival

December

- School excursion

February

- Farewell party
- Cheering Practice

March

- Graduation ceremony

== See also ==
- Iwate Prefectural Board of Education
- List of high schools in Japan
