= Jamie Gillan =

Scottish-born American football player (born 1997)

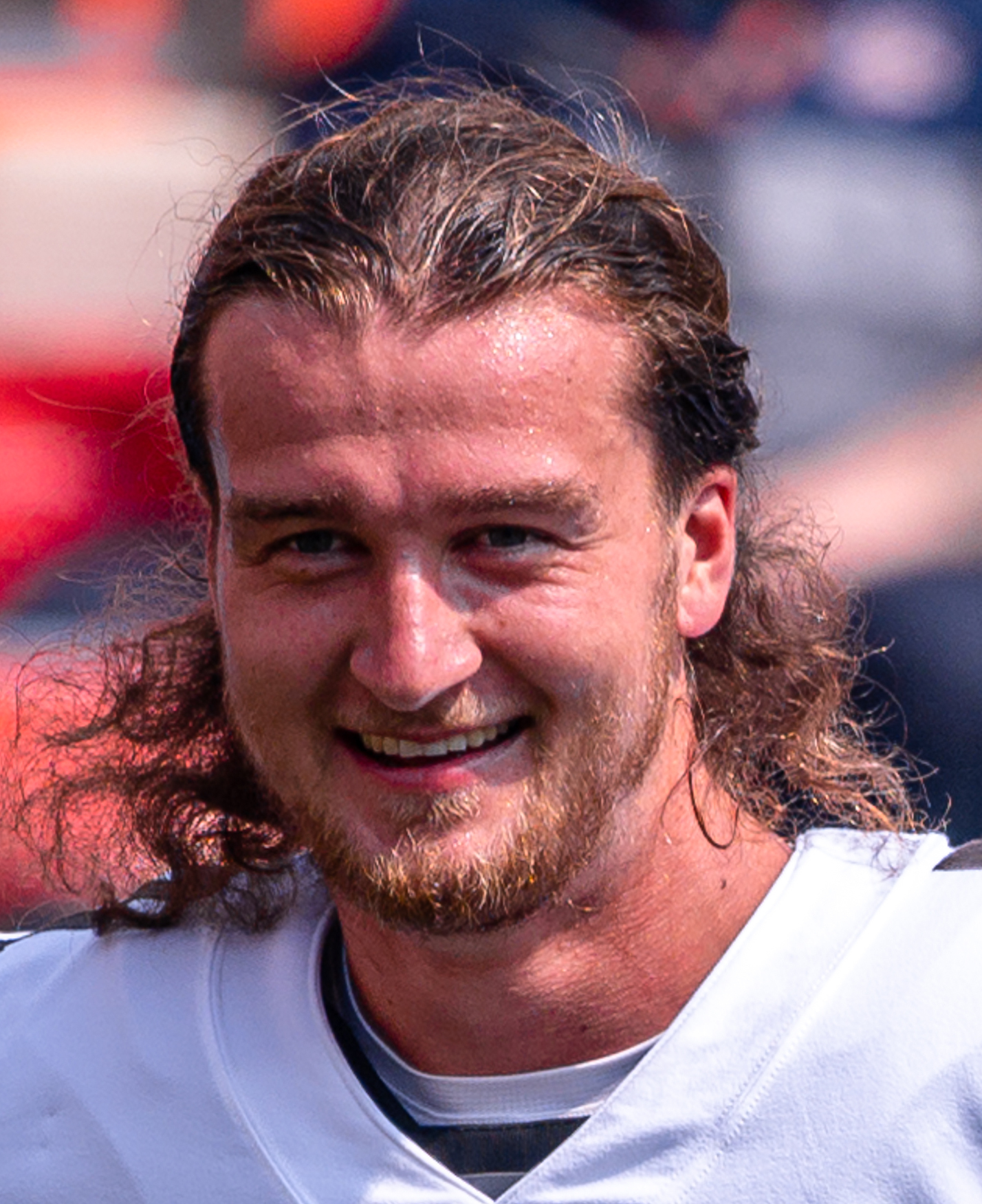
- Gillan with the Cleveland Browns in 2021

Profile
- Position: Punter

Personal information
- Born: 4 July 1997 (age 29); Forres, Scotland
- Listed height: 6 ft 1 in (1.85 m)
- Listed weight: 207 lb (94 kg)

Career information
- High school: Leonardtown (Leonardtown, Maryland, U.S.)
- College: Arkansas–Pine Bluff (2015–2018)
- NFL draft: 2019: undrafted

Career history
- Cleveland Browns (2019–2021); Buffalo Bills (2021)*; New York Giants (2022–2025)
- * Offseason or practice squad member only

Awards and highlights
- PFWA All-Rookie Team (2019); 2× First-team All-SWAC (2017, 2018; punter); First-team All-SWAC (2018; kicker)

Career NFL statistics as of 2025
- Punts: 436
- Punting yards: 19,727
- Punting average: 45.2
- Longest punt: 74
- Inside 20: 162
- Touchbacks: 28
- Stats at Pro Football Reference

Jamie Gillan (born 4 July 1997), nicknamed the Scottish Hammer, is a Scottish professional American football punter. He played college football for the Arkansas–Pine Bluff Golden Lions.

== Early life ==
Originally from Forres, Morayshire, Scotland, Gillan first played for Highland Rugby Club, before attending and playing rugby for Merchiston Castle School in Edinburgh. In 2013, he moved to Leonardtown, Maryland, where his father was stationed as a member of the Royal Air Force, and Gillan began playing American football in high school there. He then went on to play college football at the University of Arkansas at Pine Bluff, receiving the scholarship offer through a Facebook invitation. Across his four years with the Golden Lions, Gillan had a total of 9,024 yards on 214 punts and average of 42.2 yards per punt. During a pre-draft workout, he reportedly popped three regulation-size NFL footballs.

== Professional career ==
Pre-draft measurables
Height	Weight	Arm length	Hand span	Vertical jump	Broad jump	Bench press
6 ft 1 1/4 in (1.86 m)	207 lb (94 kg)	30 1/8 in (0.77 m)	8 7/8 in (0.23 m)	36.5 in (0.93 m)	9 ft 8 in (2.95 m)	23 reps
All values from Pro Day

=== Cleveland Browns ===
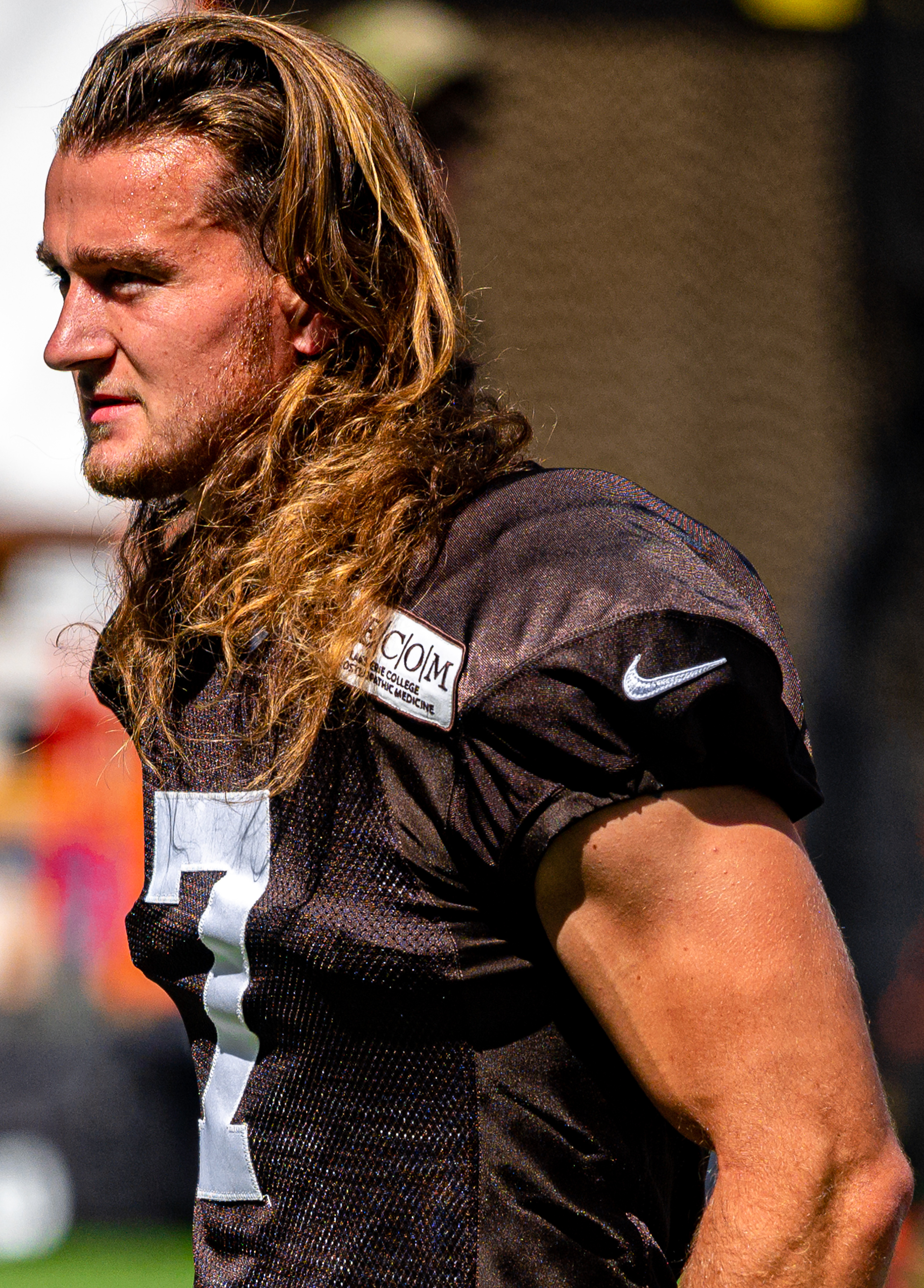
Gillan in 2019

After going undrafted in the 2019 NFL draft, Gillan signed with the Cleveland Browns. In the team's second 2019 preseason game against the Indianapolis Colts, Gillan blasted a 74-yard punt. On 31 August 2019, he was named the starting punter for the Browns over veteran Britton Colquitt.

In Week 2, Gillan punted six times, five landing inside the 20 with a long of 47 in a 23–3 win over the New York Jets, earning him AFC Special Teams Player of the Week. After having 11 punts inside the 20 and only allowing 19 punt return yards Gillan was named AFC Special Teams Player of the Month in September. In Week 5, Jamie Gillan punted 7 times for 397 yards including a 71-yard punt that set a career long for Gillan. Gillan ended his rookie season with 63 punts for 2,913 yards (2,622 net yards) with 28 punts downed inside the 20 yard line which earned him a spot on the Pro Football Writers Association All-Rookie team.

Gillan was placed on the reserve/COVID-19 list by the Browns on 30 July 2020, and activated from the list four days later.

Gillan was waived by the Browns on 22 December 2021.

=== Buffalo Bills ===
On 24 December 2021, Gillan was signed to the practice squad of the Buffalo Bills.

=== New York Giants ===
On 7 February 2022, the New York Giants signed Gillan to reserve/future contract and he became the lead contender to be the Giants' 2022 punter when the team released Riley Dixon in March. He kicked several field goals in a preseason game against the Bengals following an injury to Graham Gano, and made the 53 man roster.

On 12 December 2022, while playing in a game against the Philadelphia Eagles, Gillan was flagged for a rare illegal kick penalty. While attempting a punt, Gillan fumbled the snap and kicked the ball after it bounced off the ground. While drop kicks are legal in the National Football League during a field goal, officials decided Gillan's kick was illegal and levied a 10 yard "Illegal kick of the football" penalty against the Giants.

On 13 March 2023, Gillan signed a two-year, $4 million contract extension with the Giants. On 17 December, Gillian successfully kicked a 40–yard field goal against the New Orleans Saints, in relief for injured kicker Randy Bullock. In Week 18, Gillan punted five times with four inside the 20-yard line, in a 27-10 win over the Philadelphia Eagles, earning NFC Special Teams Player of the Week.

On 8 March 2025, Gillan signed a three-year, $10 million contract extension with the Giants. In Week 3 against the Kansas City Chiefs, Gano suffered a groin injury during warmups, causing Gillan to attempt an extra point during the game, which was blocked.

On March 11, 2026, Gillan was released by the Giants.

== Personal life ==
Gillan is nicknamed "The Scottish Hammer."

Gillan originally went to the United States on a NATO visa through his father. This was never changed to a work visa when he joined the NFL. When he traveled to London to play in a game with the New York Giants in October 2022, the visa issue delayed his return to the United States, and U.S. diplomats had to intervene to update his visa.
