= Kanagawa Prefectural Hibarigaoka High School =

Closed Japanese public high school

Coordinates: 35.4808°N 139.4364°E

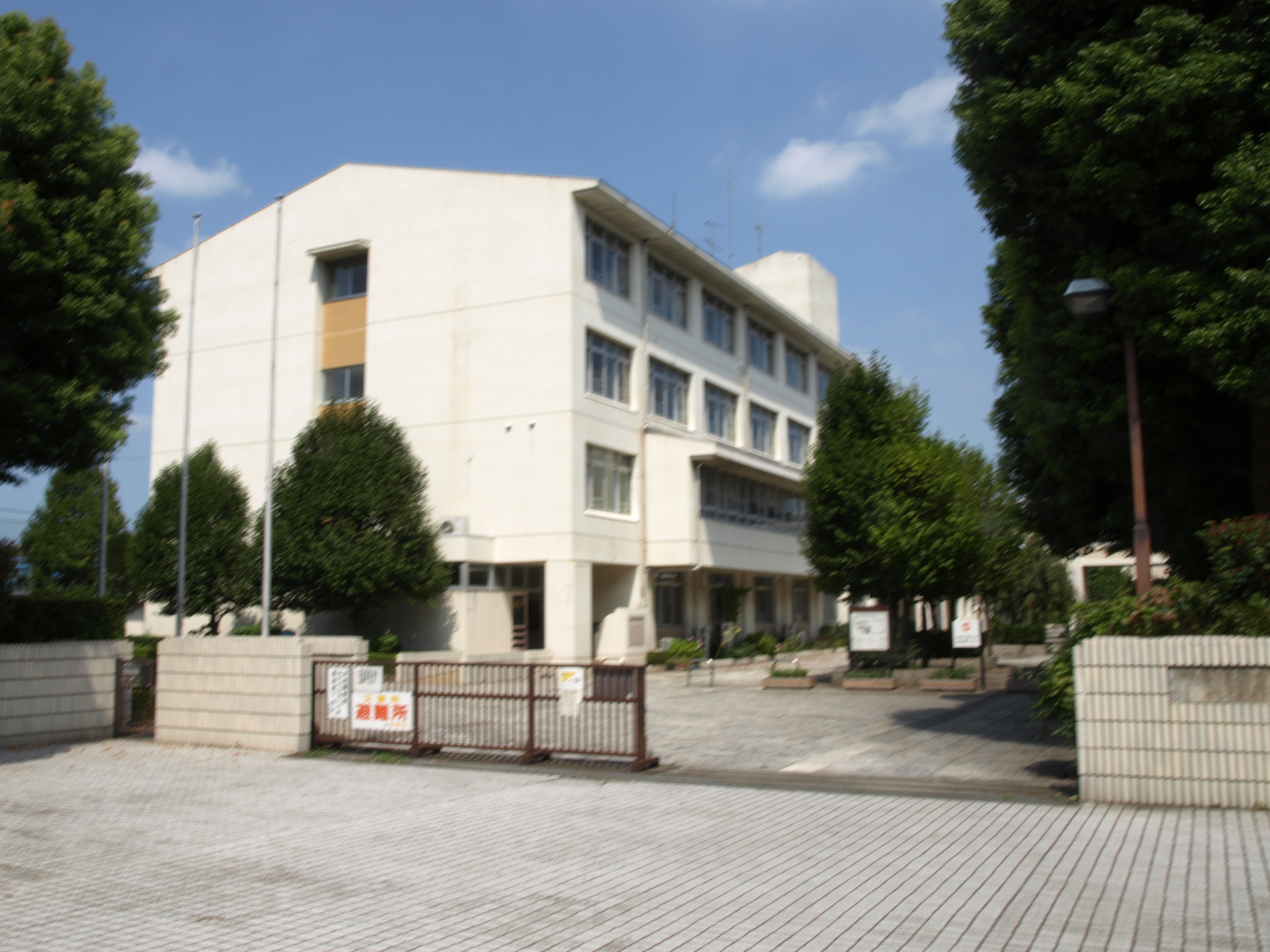
School building

Kanagawa Prefectural Hibarigaoka High School (神奈川県立ひばりが丘高等学校, Kanagawa Kenritsu Hibarigaoka Kōtōgakkō) was a public senior high school in Zama, Kanagawa, Japan. It was in the Kanagawa Prefectural Board of Education.

It opened in 1987 and was named after the Hibarigaoka ("Hill of the Skylark") area. It was one of the last schools opened as part of a prefectural high school building program established in a 1973 plan.

During the school's life, it had special provisions for non-Japanese students.

It closed in 2009.

== Sister schools ==
Hibarigaoka became the sister school of Leonardtown High School in Maryland, United States in October 1991, when the county board of education and representatives from Maryland formalized an agreement.

Hibarigaoka became the sister school of Goomeri State School in Australia in 2000.
