= Kanagawa Prefectural Yokohama Suiran High School =

Coordinates: 35°28′21″N 139°36′35.6″E

Kanagawa Prefectural Yokohama Suiran High School 神奈川県立横浜翠嵐高等学校
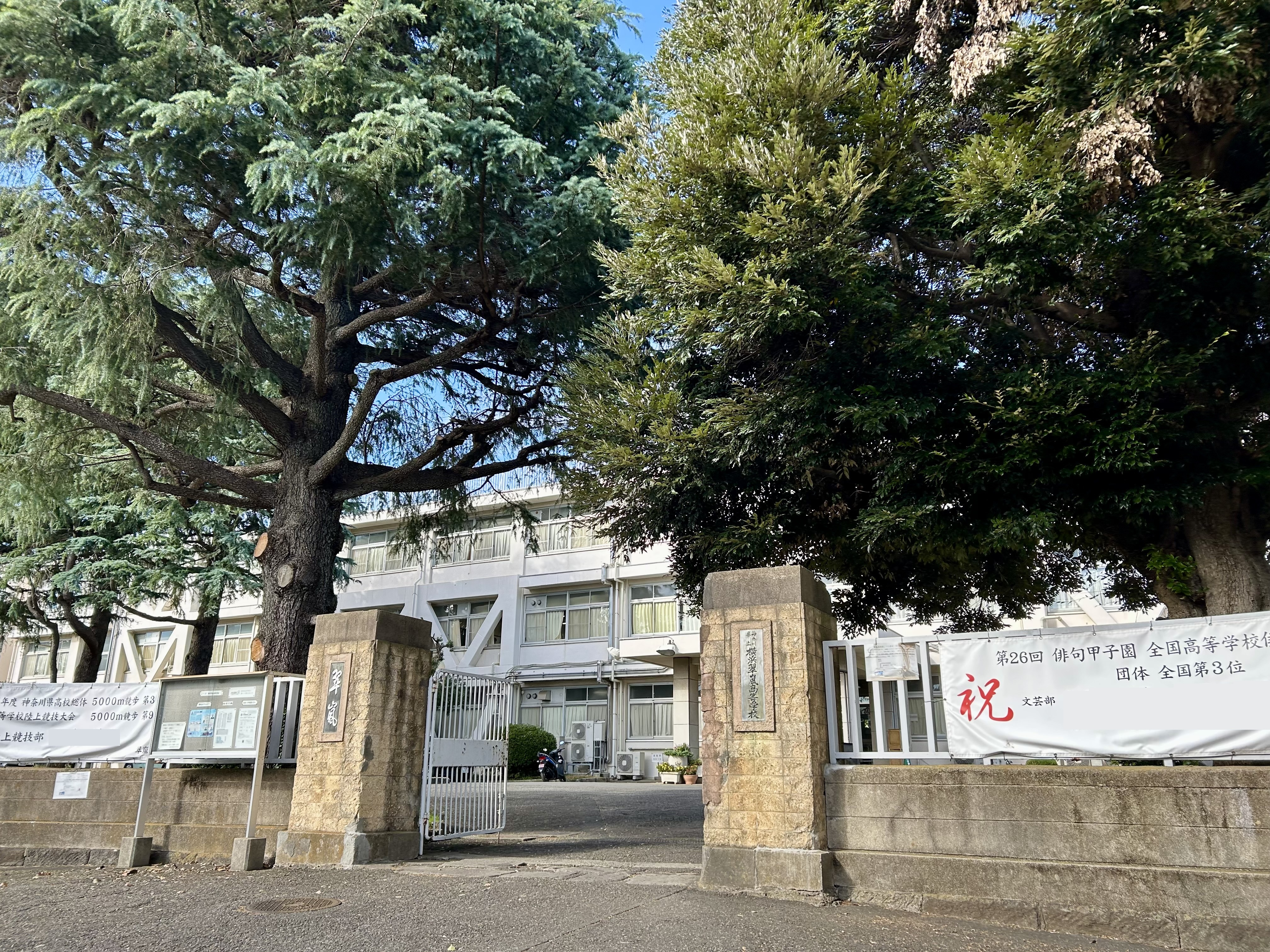
- School building
- Yokohama, Kanagawa; Japan

Information
- Type: Public Senior High School
- Established: 1914; 112 years ago
- Grades: 3 (full-time course); 4 (part-time course)
- Enrollment: 866 (full-time course); 386 (part-time course)
- Color: Green
- Website: www.yokohamasuiran-h.pen-kanagawa.ed.jp
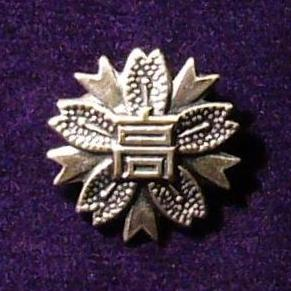
- Seal of Yokohama Suiran High School

Kanagawa Prefectural Yokohama Suiran High School (神奈川県立横浜翠嵐高等学校, Kanagawa Kenritsu Yokohama Suiran Kōtōgakkō) is a high school in Kanagawa-ku, Yokohama, Kanagawa Prefecture, Japan. It was founded in 1914. It is a part of the Kanagawa Prefectural Board of Education.

== School ==
The school is one of Kanagawa's prefectural high schools. The school provides a full-time and a part-time course. The school is co-educational, with 60% boys and 40% girls in the full-time course.

The school was established in 1914 as an "old system" junior high school. The school was originally known as Kanagawa Prefectural Second Yokohama Junior High School. In 1950, the school became co-educational and changed its name to Kanagawa Prefectural Yokohama Suiran High School. Suiran means "the green air that envelops the mountains" and names the school song.

The school signed a sister school agreement with Eleanor Roosevelt High School of Greenbelt, Maryland, in 1989. As part of this agreement, the two schools have an exchange program. Students from each school spend up to a week at the other as part of school cultural exchange trips. Suiran students typically visit ERHS in March, and ERHS students typically visit Suiran in June.

== Student life ==
Most students live in Kanagawa Prefecture, with a typical commuting time of 60 minutes.

The school operates on a semester system with a five-week summer vacation and a two-week break at the end of the year.

== See also ==
- Kanagawa Prefectural Board of Education
