= Kanagawa Sohgoh High School =

School in Yokohama, Japan

Coordinates: 35.4812°N 139.6286°E

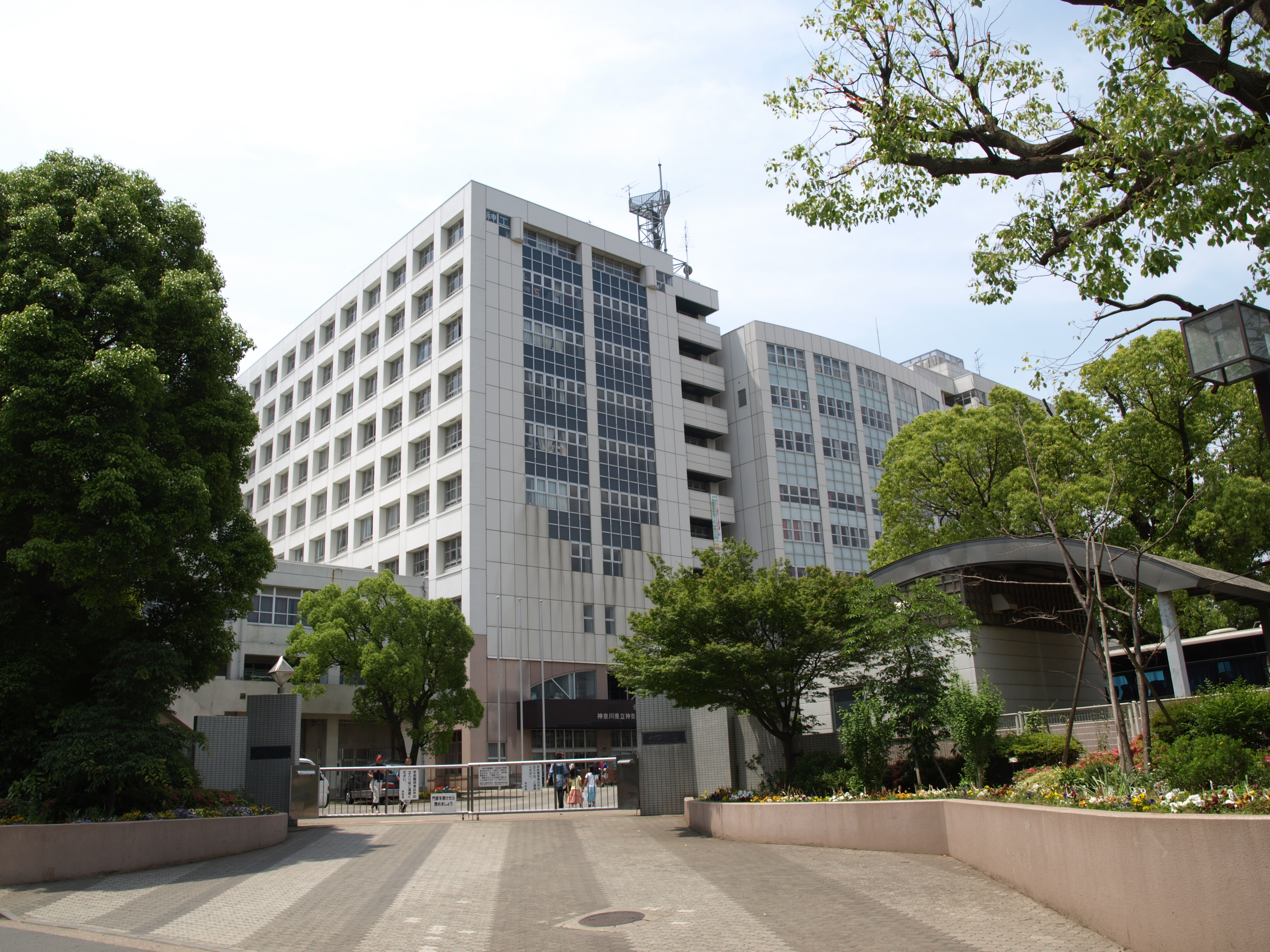
Kanagawa Sohgoh High School

Kanagawa Prefectural Kanagawa Sohgoh High School (神奈川県立神奈川総合高等学校, Kanagawa Kenritsu Kanagawa Sōgō Kōtōgakkō; "Kanagawa Comprehensive High School") is a public senior high school in Kanagawa-ku, Yokohama. It is a part of the Kanagawa Prefectural Board of Education.

It has special provisions for non-Japanese students, as it accepts the Zaiken Gaikokujin-tō Tokubetsu Boshū (在県外国人等特別募集).
