= Namamugi Station =

Railway station in Yokohama, Japan

KK31 Namamugi Station 生麦駅
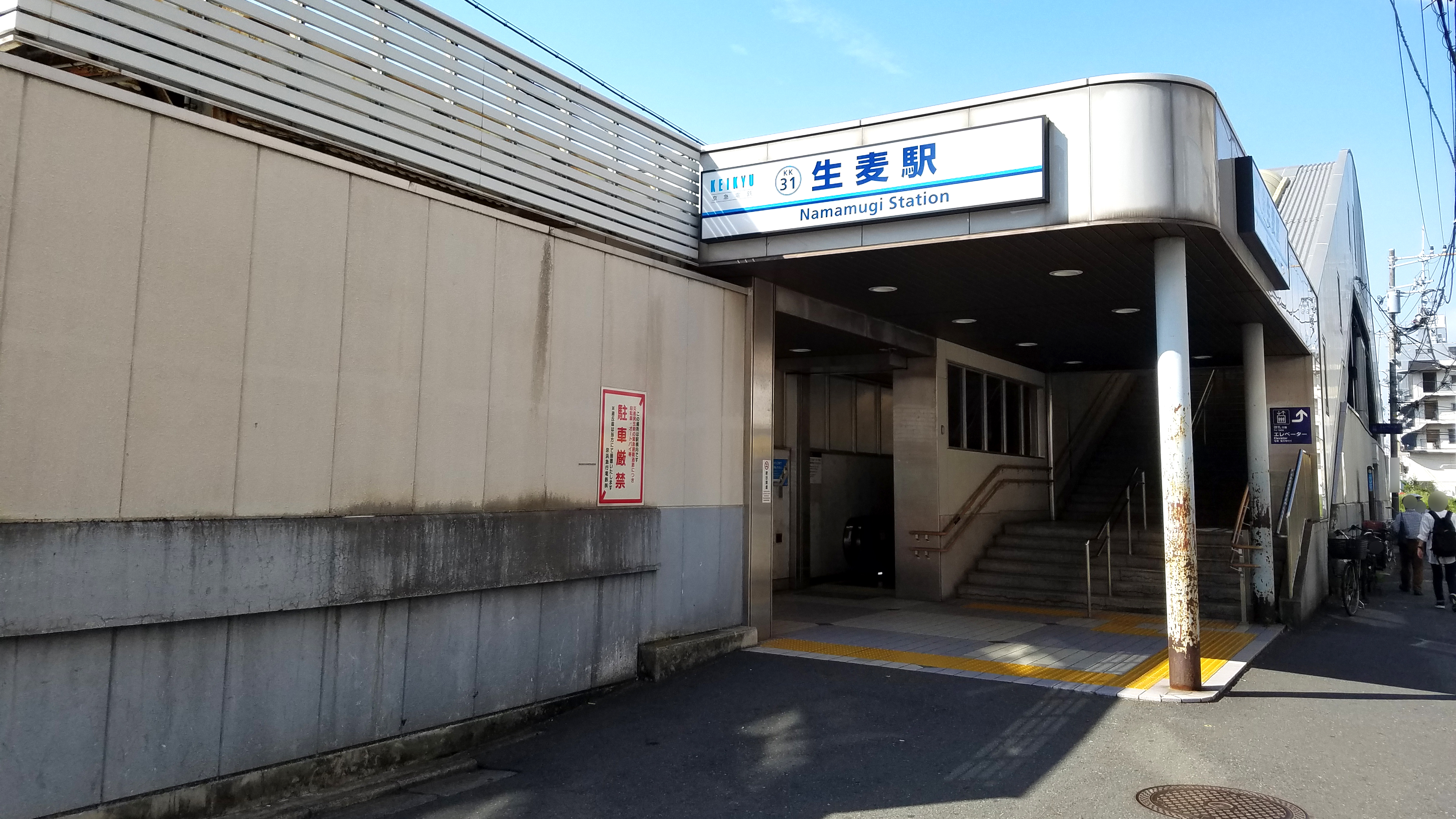
- The east-side entrance to the station in June 2021

General information
- Location: Namamugi- 3-3-35, Tsurumi-ku, Yokohama-shi, Kanagawa-ken 30-0052; Japan
- Coordinates: 35.4956°N 139.6675°E
- Operator: Keikyū
- Line: Keikyū Main Line
- Distance: 16.9 km from Shinagawa
- Platforms: 1 island + 1 side platform
- Connections: Bus stop

Other information
- Station code: KK31
- Website: Official website

History
- Opened: December 24, 1905

Passengers
- 2019: 29,910 daily

Services
Preceding station	Keikyu	Following station
Keikyū Shinkoyasu KK32 towards Uraga	Main Line Local	Kagetsu-sōjiji KK30 towards Shinagawa
Location
- Location within Kanagawa Prefecture Location within Japan

Namamugi Station (生麦駅, Namamugi-eki) is a passenger railway station located in Tsurumi-ku, Yokohama, Kanagawa Prefecture, Japan, operated by the private railway company Keikyū.

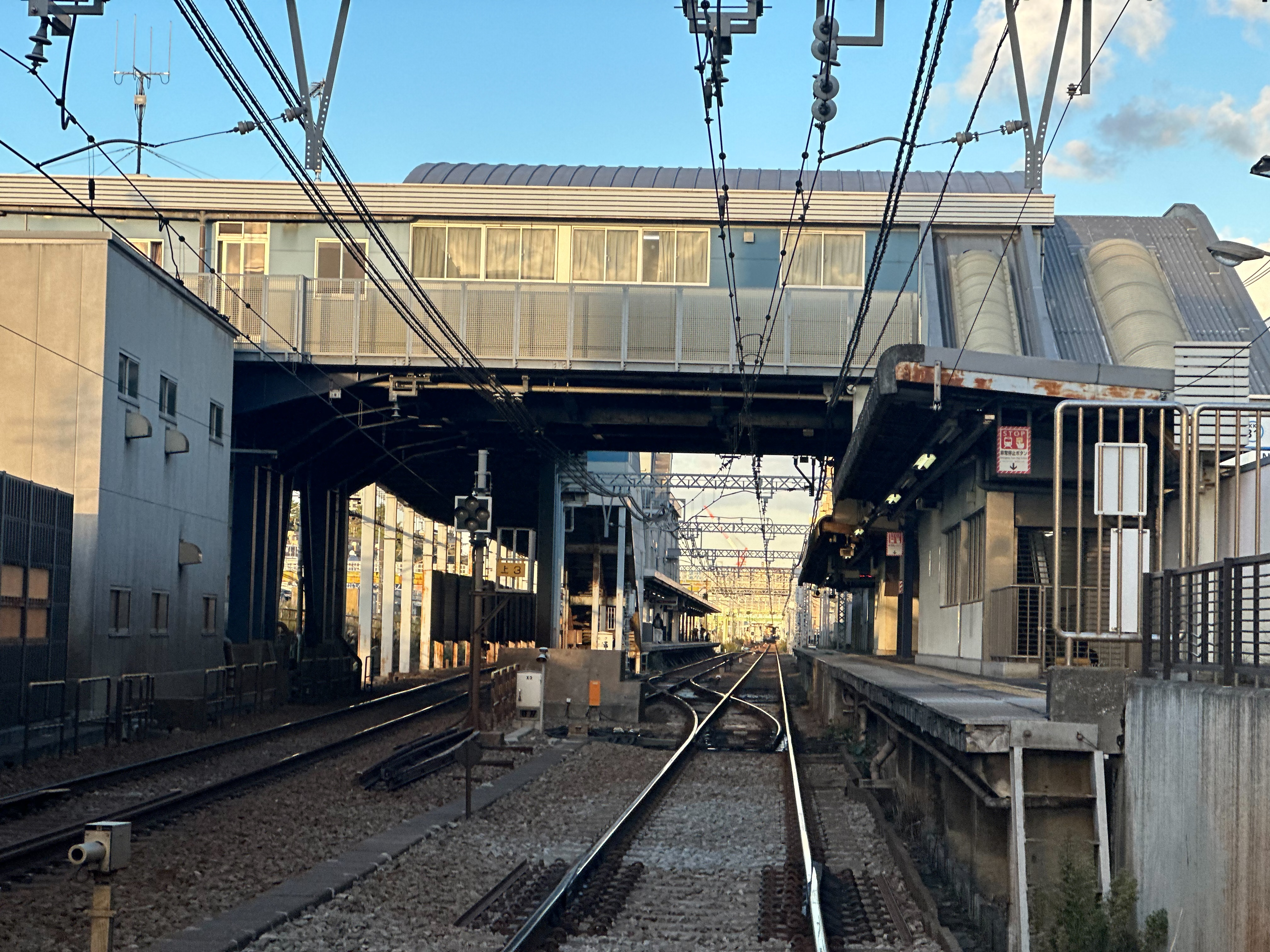
Platforms, 2023

== Lines ==
Namamugi Station is served by the Keikyū Main Line and is located 16.9 kilometers from the terminus of the line at Shinagawa Station in Tokyo.

== Station layout ==
The station consists of single island platform and a single side platform serving three tracks, with the middle track on a passing loop, connected by an elevated station building built over the platforms and tracks.

== Station layout ==
1, 2	■ Keikyū Main Line	for Yokohama, Shin-Zushi, Uraga, Misakiguchi
3	■ Keikyū Main Line	for Keikyū Kamata, Haneda Airport, and Shinagawa

== History ==
Namamugi Station opened on 24 December 1905. The station was rebuilt as an elevated station in November 1967.

Keikyū introduced station numbering to its stations on 21 October 2010; Namamugi Station was assigned station number KK31.

== Passenger statistics ==
In fiscal 2019, the station was used by an average of 29,910 passengers daily.

The passenger figures for previous years are as shown below.

Fiscal year	daily average
2005	28,757
2010	27,216
2015	28,313

== Surrounding area ==
- Yokohama College of Commerce Tsurumi Campus
- Hosei University International High School
- Yokohama City Kishiya Elementary School
- Yokohama City Namamugi Elementary School
- Yokohama City Namamugi Junior High School

== See also ==
- List of railway stations in Japan
