= Institute of Information Security =

Coordinates: 35°28′5″N 139°37′24″E

- 情報セキュリティ大学院大学; Jōhō sekyuriti daigaku-in daigaku
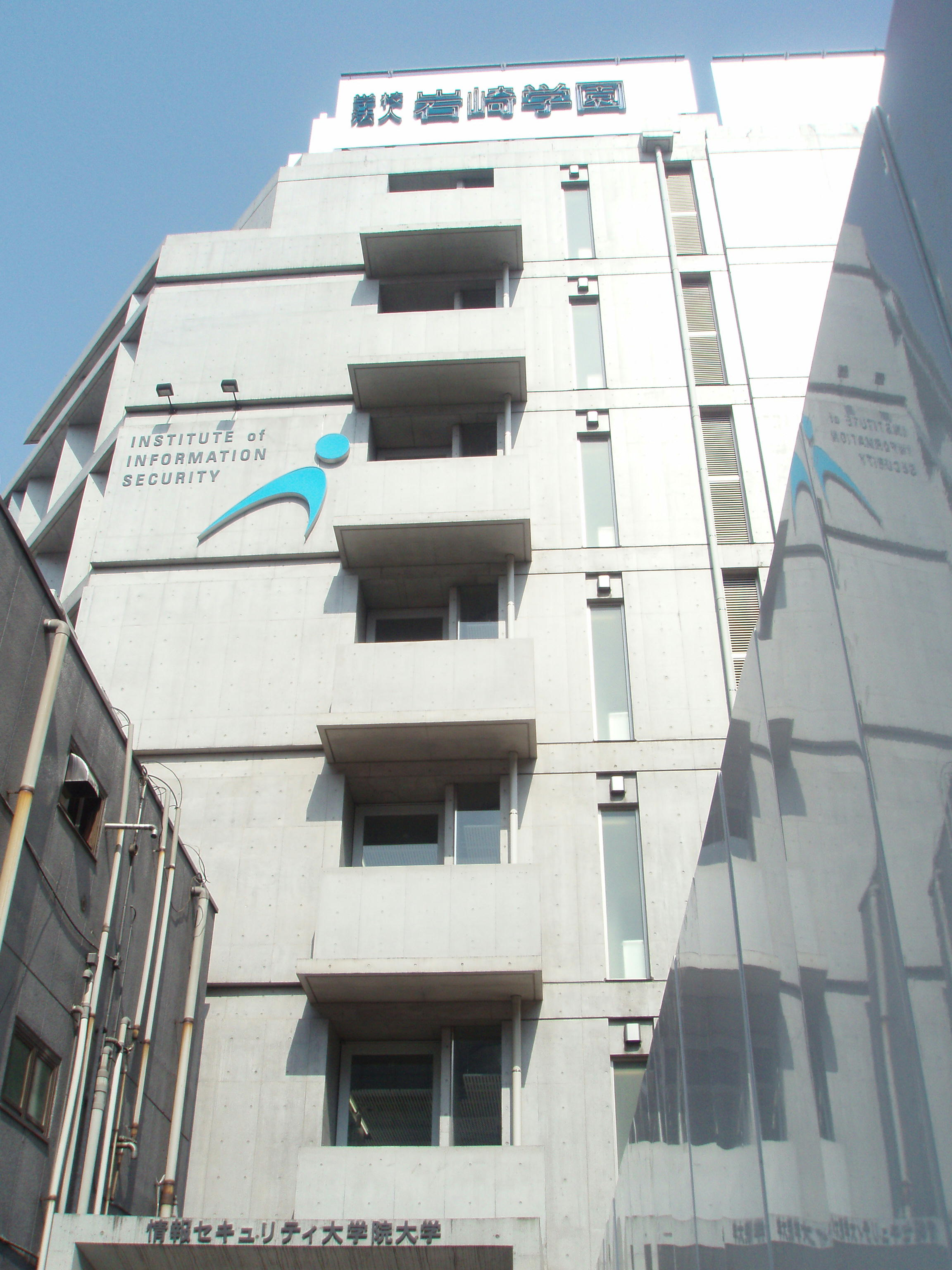
- Type: Private
- Established: 2004
- Location: Kanagawa-ku, Yokohama, Kanagawa, Japan
- Website: Official website

Institute of Information Security (情報セキュリティ大学院大学, Jōhō sekyuriti daigaku-in daigaku) is a private university in Kanagawa-ku, Yokohama, Kanagawa Prefecture Japan. It was established in 2004 and offers a graduate studies and post-doctorate studies program
