= Keikyū Shinkoyasu Station =

Railway station in Yokohama, Japan

KK32 Keikyū Shinkoyasu Station 京急新子安駅
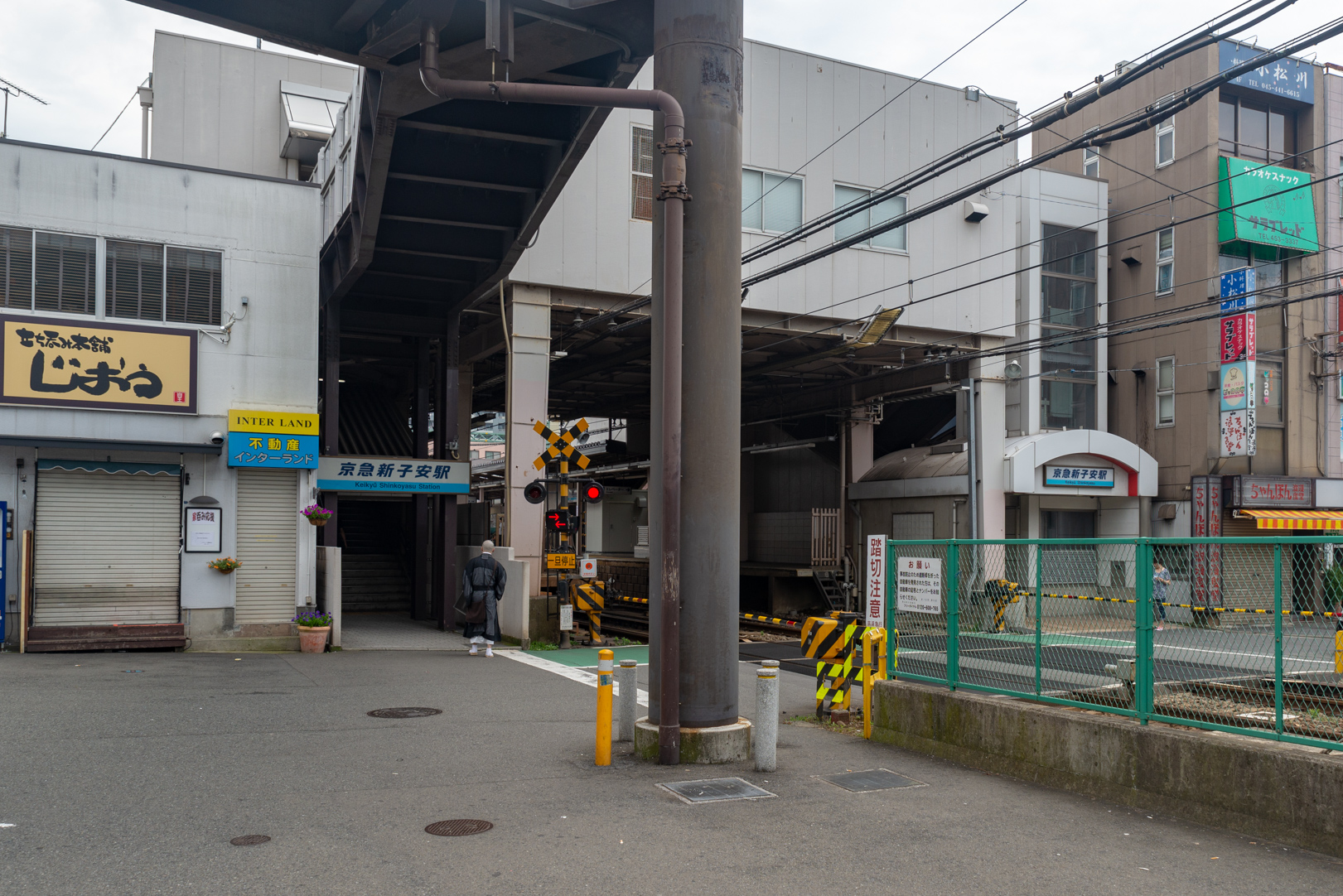
- The entrances to the Station in July 2014

General information
- Location: 3-289 Koyasudōri, Kanagawa-ku, Yokohama-shi, Kanagawa-ken 221-0021; Japan
- Coordinates: 35°29′13.58″N 139°39′19.94″E
- Operator: Keikyū
- Line: Keikyū Main Line
- Distance: 18.3 km from Shinagawa
- Platforms: 2 side platforms
- Connections: Bus stop

Other information
- Station code: KK32
- Website: Official website

History
- Opened: March 27, 1910
- Former names: Shin-Koyasu (until 1943); Keihin Shin-Koyasu (until 1987)

Passengers
- 2019: 8,399 daily

Services
Preceding station	Keikyu	Following station
Koyasu KK33 towards Uraga	Main Line Local	Namamugi KK31 towards Shinagawa
Location
- Location within Kanagawa Prefecture Location within Japan

Keikyū Shinkoyasu Station (京急新子安駅, Keikyū Shinkoyasu-eki) is a passenger railway station located in Kanagawa-ku, Yokohama, Kanagawa Prefecture, Japan, operated by the private railway company Keikyū.

== Lines ==
Keikyū Shinkoyasu Station is served by the Keikyū Main Line and is located 18.3 kilometers from the terminus of the line at Shinagawa Station in Tokyo.

== Station layout ==
The station consists of two ground-level opposed side platforms connected to the station building by a footbridge.

=== Platforms ===
1	■ Keikyū Main Line	for Yokohama, Shinzushi, Uraga, Misakiguchi
2	■ Keikyū Main Line	for Keikyū Kamata, Haneda Airport, and Shinagawa

== History ==
Keikyū Shinkoyasu Station opened on March 27, 1910 as Shin-Koyasu Station (新子安駅, Shin-Koyasu-eki). It was renamed Keihin Shin-Koyasu Station (京浜新子安駅, Keihin Shin-Koyasu-eki) on November 1, 1943 to distinguish it from the nearby Shin-Koyasu Station on the Japanese Government Railway (JGR) system. The station was rebuilt as an elevated station in February 1979. The station assumed its present name from June 1, 1987.

Keikyū introduced station numbering to its stations on 21 October 2010; Keikyū Shinkoyasu Station was assigned station number KK32.

== Passenger statistics ==
In fiscal 2019, the station was used by an average of 8,399 passengers daily.

The passenger figures for previous years are as shown below.

Fiscal year	daily average
2005	7,795
2010	8,164
2015	8,371

== Surrounding area ==
- Shin-Koyasu Station
- Yokohama Shinkoyasu Post Office
- Asano Junior & Senior High School

== See also ==
- List of railway stations in Japan
