= Yokosuka Sogo High School =

Coordinates: 35°13′46.9″N 139°42′32.2″E

Yokosuka Municipal Yokosuka Sogo High School
- 横須賀総合高等学校
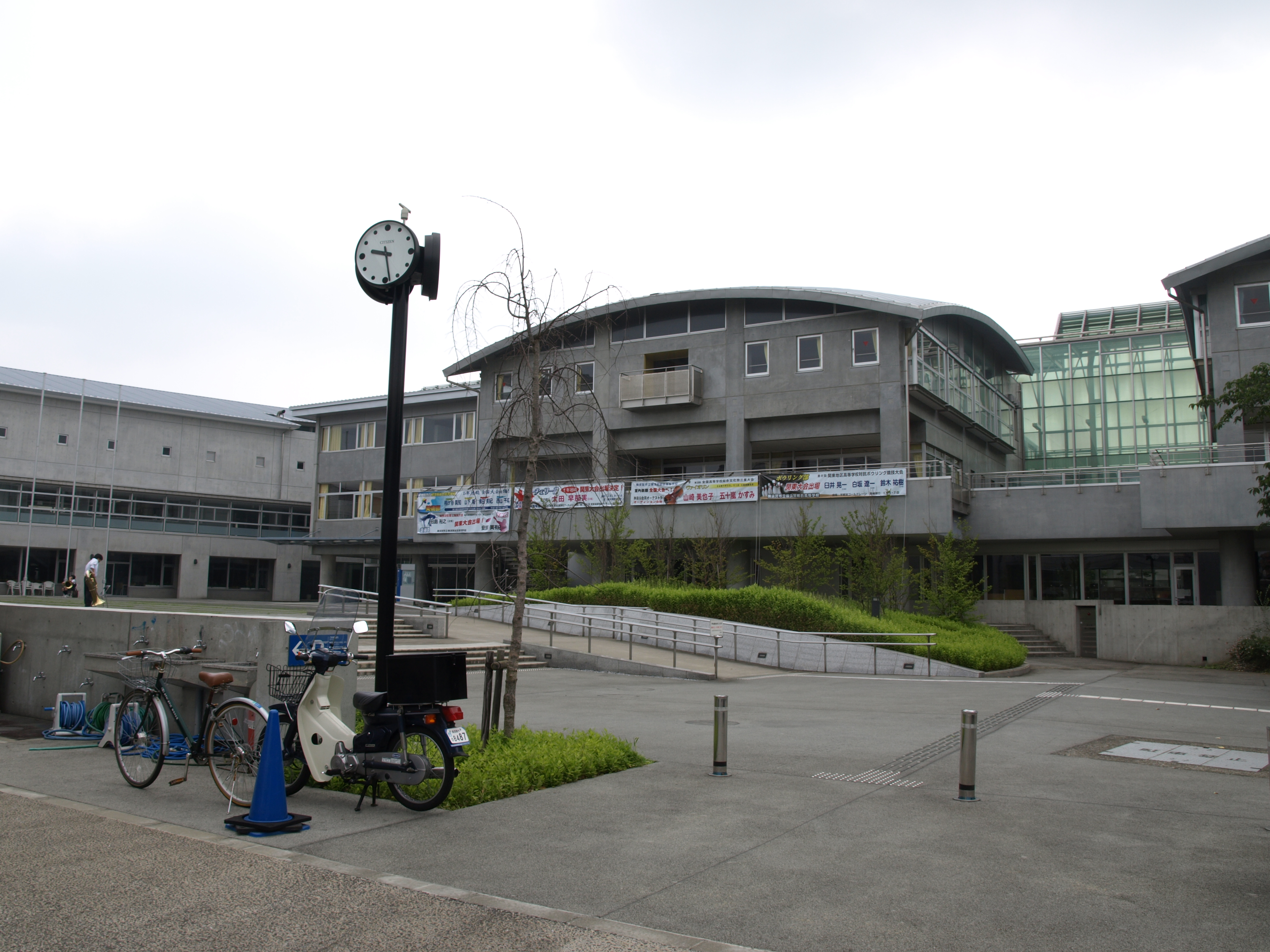

Location
- 6-1-1 Kurihama; Yokosuka, Kanagawa 239-0831; Japan

Information
- Type: Public, Secondary
- Established: 1 April 2003
- School district: Yokosuka Education System
- Principal: Yoshiyuki Yamagishi
- Gender: Coeducational
- Website: Official Website

Yokosuka Municipal Yokosuka Sogo High School (Japanese: 横須賀総合高等学校, romanized: Yokosuka Senritsu Yokosuka Sōgō Kōtōgakkō) is a secondary school located in Yokosuka, Kanagawa Prefecture, Japan.

Yokosuka Sogo, which opened on April 1, 2003, is the only high school operated by the Yokosuka Education System, a municipally controlled school district serving Yokosuka residents.

As of 2016, the principal of Yokosuka Sogo is Yoshiyuki Yamagishi.
