= Iwate Prefectural Board of Education =

Iwate Prefectural Board of Education (岩手県教育委員会) is the education authority of Iwate Prefecture, Japan.

It acts as a school district, operating public high schools in the prefecture.

High Schools:

- Morioka First High School
- Morioka Third High School

== Prize ==
Students outstanding in volunteer, sports, and cultural activities are awarded "Habataki Prize (lit. flutter prize)"

- Habataki Prize (はばたき賞)
