= Ōguchi Station =

Railway station in Yokohama, Japan

JH14 Ōguchi Station 大口駅
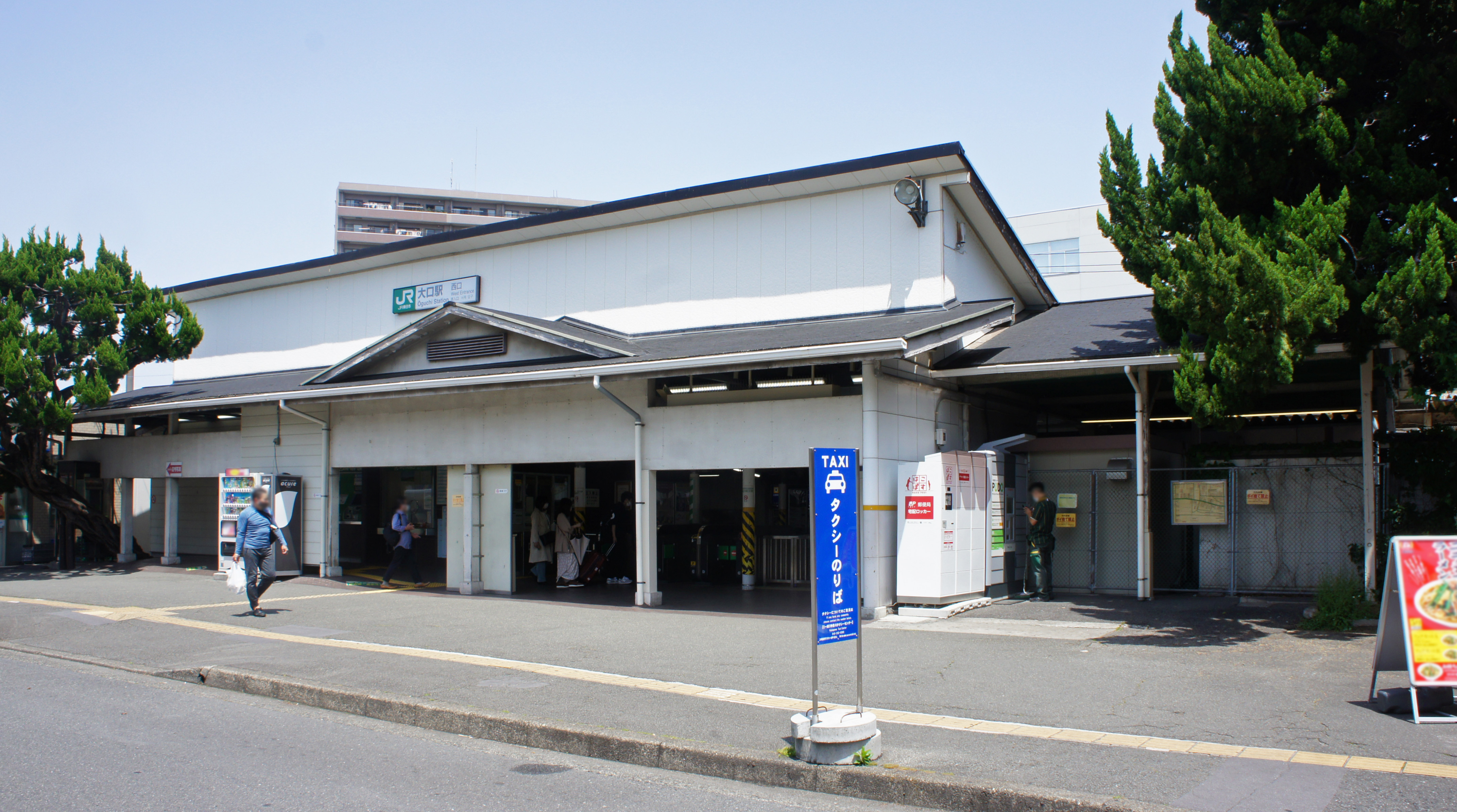
- Ōguchi Station, May 2021

General information
- Location: Ōguchi-dōri, Kanagawa-ku, Yokohama-shi, Kanagawa-ken 221-0002; Japan
- Coordinates: 35°29′32″N 139°38′46″E
- Operator: JR East
- Line: Yokohama Line
- Platforms: 1 island platform

Other information
- Status: Staffed (Midori no Madoguchi )
- Station code: JH14
- Website: Official website

History
- Opened: 20 December 1947

Passengers
- FY2019: 19,085 daily

Services
Preceding station	JR East	Following station
Kikuna JH15 towards Hachiōji	Yokohama Line Local	Higashi-Kanagawa JH13 towards Higashi-Kanagawa or Ōfuna
Location
- Location within Kanagawa Prefecture Location within Japan

Ōguchi Station (大口駅, Ōguchi-eki) is a passenger railway station located in Kanagawa-ku, Yokohama, Kanagawa Prefecture, Japan, operated by the East Japan Railway Company (JR East).

== Lines ==
Ōguchi Station is served by the Yokohama Line from Higashi-Kanagawa to Hachiōji, and is 2.2 km from the official starting point of the line at Higashi-Kanagawa. Many services continue west of Higashi-Kanagawa via the Negishi Line to Sakuragicho during the offpeak, and to Ōfuna during the morning peak.

== Station layout ==
The station consists of a single ground-level island platform serving two tracks, connected to the station building by a footbridge. The station has a Midori no Madoguchi staffed ticket office.

=== Platforms ===
1	Yokohama Line	for Machida and Hachioji
2	Yokohama Line	for Higashi-Kanagawa, Sakuragicho, and Ōfuna

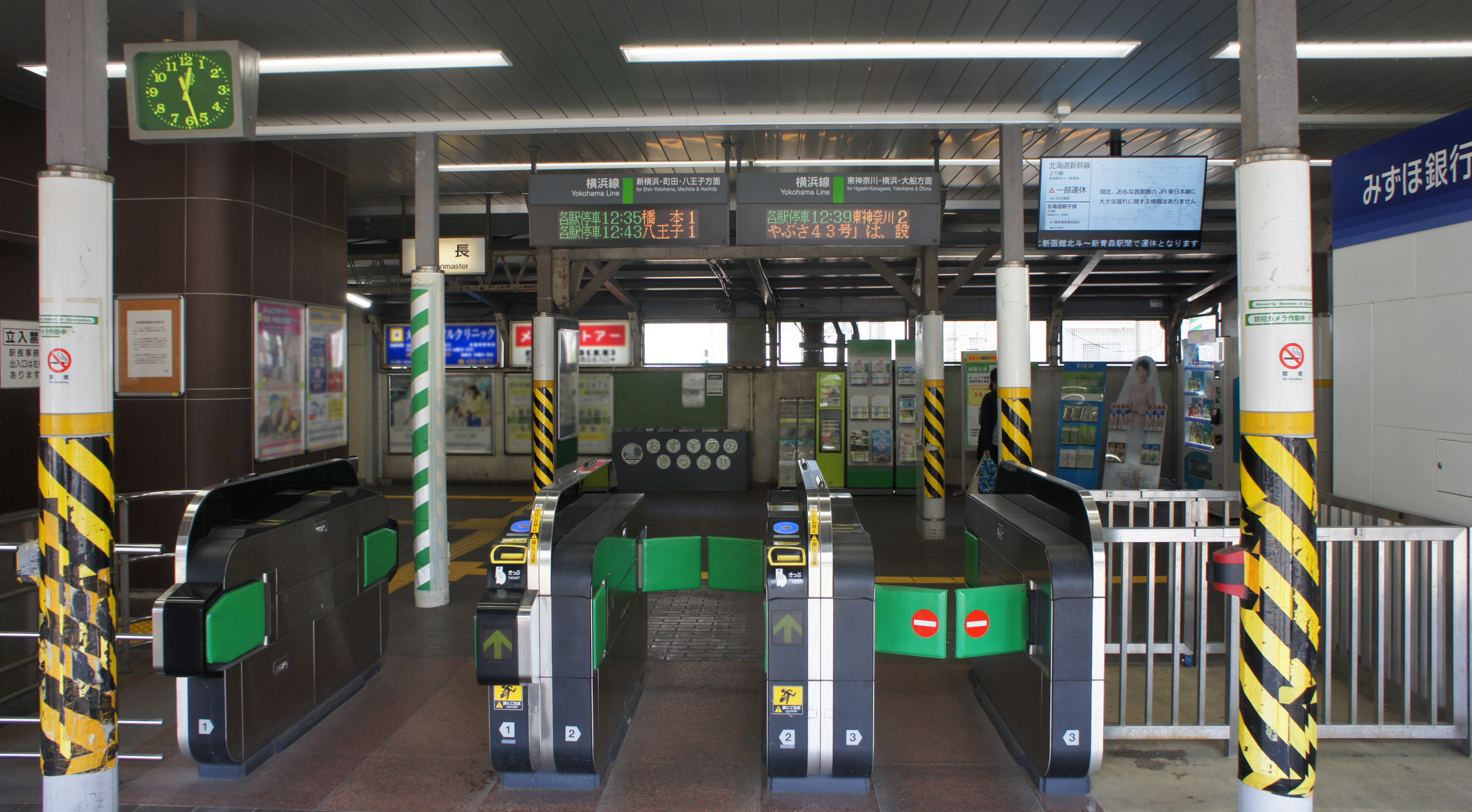
Ticket gates

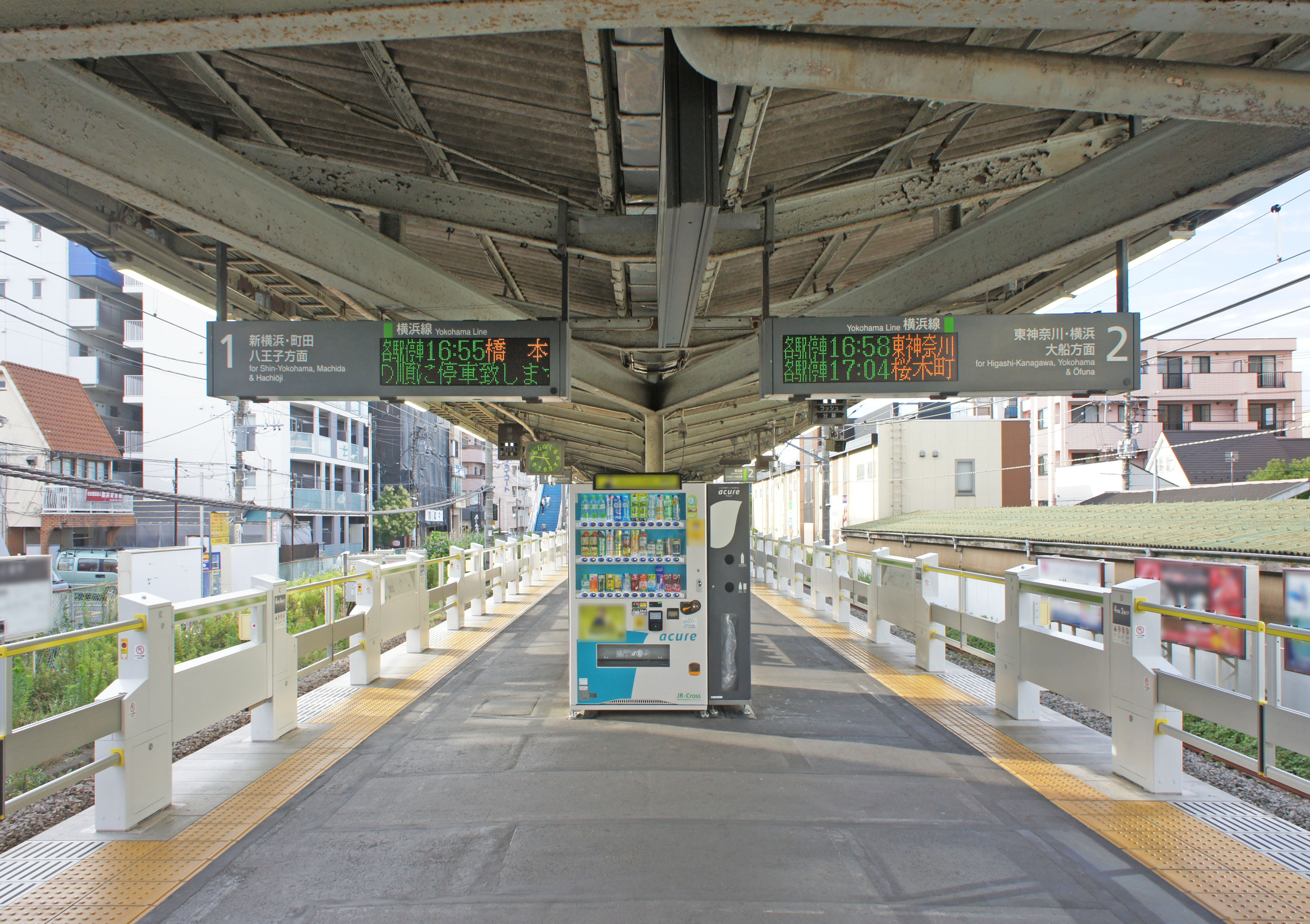
Platforms 1 and 2

== History ==
Ōguchi Station opened on 20 December 1947 as a station on the Japanese National Railways (JNR). With the privatization of the JNR on 1 April 1987, the station came under the operational control of JR East.

Station numbering was introduced on 20 August 2016 with Ōguchi being assigned station number JH14.

== Passenger statistics ==
In fiscal 2019, the station was used by an average of 19,085 passengers daily (boarding passengers only).

The passenger figures (boarding passengers only) for previous years are as shown below.

Fiscal year	daily average
2005	16,677
2010	17,096
2015	18,148

== See also ==
- List of railway stations in Japan
