= Morioka Third High School =

Coordinates: 39°43′46.3″N 141°8′18.2″E

Morioka Daisan High School
- 岩手県立盛岡第三高等学校

Location
- 4-17-16 Takamatsu, Morioka-shi Iwate-ken, Japan; Morioka; Japan

Information
- Type: Public secondary, co-educational
- Established: April 1, 1963
- Grades: 10-12
- Campus: Urban
- Website: www2.iwate-ed.jp/mo3-h/
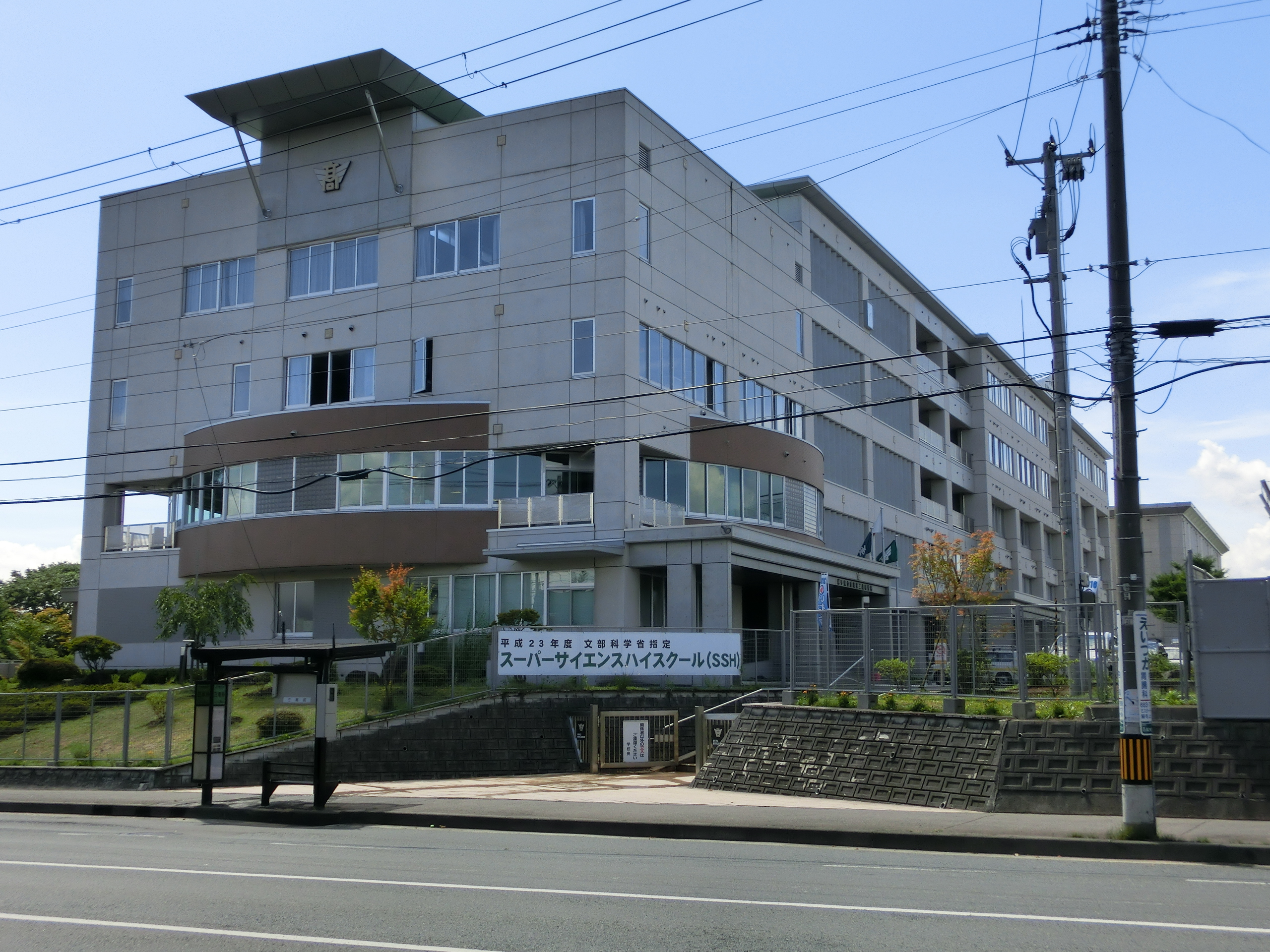
- Main building

The Morioka Daisan High School (岩手県立盛岡第三高等学校, Iwate-kenritsu Morioka Daisan Kōtōgakkō), commonly referred to as Morioka Third High School or San-Kō, is located in Morioka, Iwate Prefecture, Japan. It is the third oldest public high school in the city, founded in 1963. It has a student body of approximately 1,000 students. The school is managed by the Iwate Prefectural Board of Education.

Morioka Third High School's symbol is the Ōtori, which corresponds to "freedom, peace, truth, dreams and intellect that will spread without limit".

In 2001, the school replaced its old school building with a newer, larger facility. Most of the school is not air conditioned in the summer, but the entire school is heated, including the corridors. The school has two gymnasiums, however one is almost exclusively used for volleyball practice and games only.

== School uniforms ==
The students are required to wear standard Japanese high school uniforms.

== School clubs ==
The school has daily sports club activities for kendo, judo, archery, athletics, basketball, volleyball, handball, table tennis, tennis, soft tennis, badminton, soccer, swimming, rowing, skiing, rugby, rhythmic gymnastics, baseball and skating.

Additionally there are clubs for the school newspaper, photography, chorus, brass band, theater, biology, flower arranging, astronomy, fine art, physics, Japanese literature and Go

== Notable alumni ==
- Akahira Hiroshi - Television announcer
- Masanori Murakawa - Japanese professional wrestler and former Iwate Prefectural Assembly legislator
- Fumito Kumagai - Businessman and former Livedoor Co. director
- Shingo Kimura - Television announcer
