= Shin-Koyasu Station =

Railway station in Yokohama, Japan

JK14 Shin-Koyasu Station 新子安駅
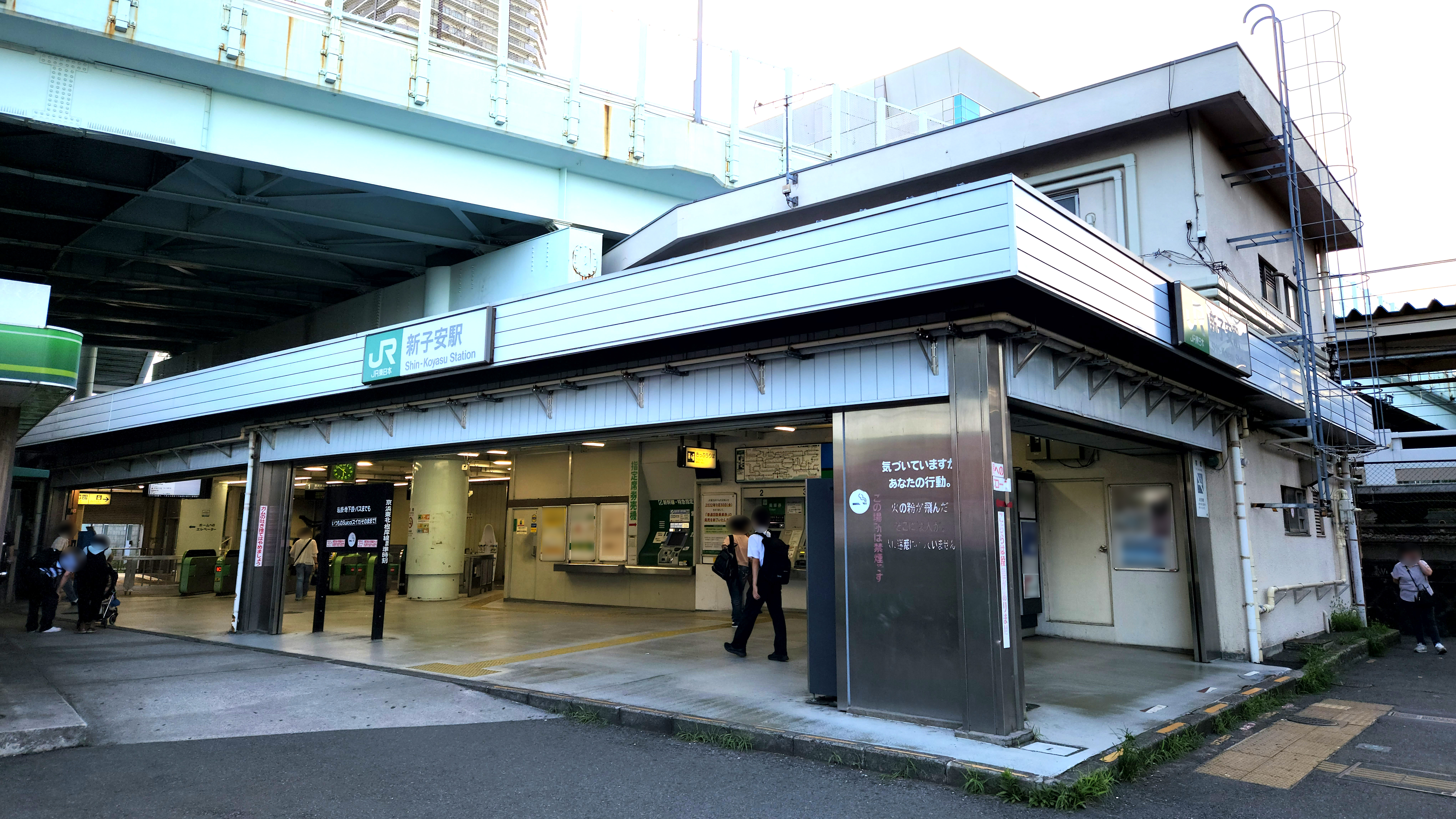
- Shin-Koyasu Station exterior, July 2022

General information
- Location: 2 Chome Koyasudori, Kanagawa-ku, Yokohama-shi, Kanagawa-ken 221-0021; Japan
- Coordinates: 35°29′13″N 139°39′17″E
- Operator: JR East
- Line: Keihin-Tōhoku Line
- Distance: 55.1 km from Ōmiya
- Platforms: 1 island platform

Other information
- Status: Staffed
- Station code: JK14
- Website: Official website

History
- Opened: 11 November 1943

Passengers
- FY2019: 23,894 daily

Services
Preceding station	JR East	Following station
Higashi-Kanagawa JK13 towards Yokohama	Keihin–Tōhoku Line Rapid Local	Tsurumi JK15 towards Ōmiya
Location
- Location within Kanagawa Prefecture Location within Japan

Shin-Koyasu Station (新子安駅, Shin-koyasu-eki) is a passenger railway station located in Kanagawa-ku, Yokohama, Kanagawa Prefecture, Japan, operated by the East Japan Railway Company (JR East).

== Lines ==
Shin-Koyasu Station is served by the Keihin-Tōhoku Line and the Yokohama Line. It is 55.1 kilometers from the terminus of the Keihin-Tōhoku line at Ōmiya, and 24.8 kilometers from Tokyo.

== Station layout ==
The station consists of one elevated island platform serving two tracks, with the station building underneath. The station is staffed.

=== Platforms ===
1	Keihin-Tōhoku Line	for Higashi-Kanagawa, Yokohama, Isogo, and Ōfuna
2	Keihin-Tōhoku Line	for Kawasaki, Shinagawa, Tokyo, Ueno, and Ōmiya

== History ==
The station opened on 11 November 1943.

== Passenger statistics ==
In fiscal 2019, the station was used by an average of 23,894 passengers daily (boarding passengers only).

The passenger figures (boarding passengers only) for previous years are as shown below.

Fiscal year	daily average
2005	20,185
2010	21,087
2015	22,551

== Surrounding area ==
- Keikyū Shinkoyasu Station

== See also ==
- List of railway stations in Japan
