= Acty Shiodome =

Skyscraper in Japan

- アクティ汐留
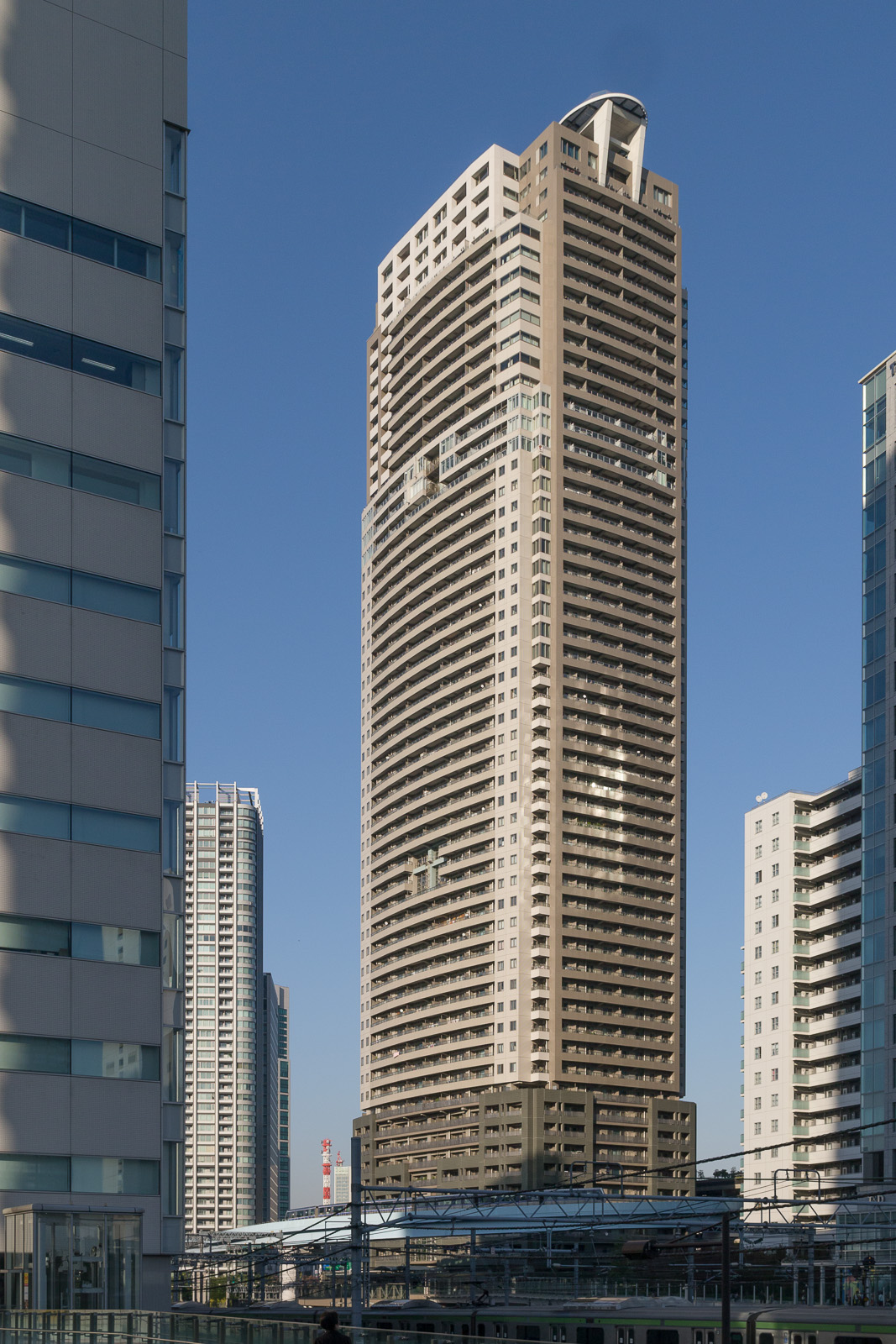

General information
- Type: Reinforced Concrete
- Location: 1-1 Kaigan, Minato; Tokyo, Japan
- Coordinates: 35.658578°N 139.758720°E
- Construction started: 2000
- Completed: 28 February 2004

Height
- Roof: 190.3 meters (624 ft)
- Top floor: 183.6 meters (602 ft)

Technical details
- Floor count: 56 above ground 2 below ground
- Floor area: 69,560.56 m^{2} (748,743.6 sq ft)

Design and construction
- Developer: Urban Renaissance Agency
- Main contractor: Joint venture of Takenaka Corporation, Sumitomo Mutsui Construction Co. Ltd., and Ando Corporation

The Acty Shiodome is a 190-metre, 56-storey residential skyscraper in the Shiodome area of Minato-Ku, Tokyo, Japan. It was constructed between April 2000 and February 2004, and is currently the second tallest residential building in Japan. The building has a nickname of "La Tour Shiodome", which is actually the name of the private luxury units on the top floors. The building has a total of 768 units, with 683 rental units between the 3rd and 44th floors, and 85 private luxury units on floors 45 to 56. The building is owned by the Urban Development Corporation, part of the Urban Renaissance Agency. Floors 45 to 56 are offered for rent through Urban Development Corporation's "Private Enterprise Rental Housing System". The first two floors contain shops, a day care centre, and medical clinics. The JR Yokosuka Line passes directly under the building, which is flanked by the Yurikamome New Transit line on the west and south sides, and the Shuto Expressway on the east.

== Local Places of Interest ==
- Hamarikyu Gardens (浜離宮恩賜庭園) - 1/4 mile Northeast
- Kyu Shiba Rikyu Garden (旧芝離宮) - 1/4 mile South
- Acty Shiodome Steps Garden - Adjacent on North side of Acty Shiodome site
- Italia Park (イタリア公園) - Adjacent on North side of Acty Shiodome site
- Pokémon Center Tokyo - Located in the building next door.
- Shopping Mall - Shiodome City Center (汐留シティセンター) - 8-10 min. walk
- Tsukiji Fish Market (築地市場) - 15 min walk

== Transportation ==
- Daimon Subway Station (5 min. walk)
- Hammatsucho Train Station (5 min. walk)
- Shiodome Train Station (6 min. walk)
- Shimbashi Train Station (10 min. walk)
- Car Parking: 366 Spaces in structure attached by walkway
- Bicycle Parking: Located on first basement floor
- Motorcycle Parking: Located on first basement floor
- Helicopter Pad: Located on Roof

== Directions ==
- From Daimon Subway Station: Follow signs to Exit B1. Walk 300 feet (100 metres) straight ahead (east), cross a small side street, go up escalator on your left, La Tour/Acty Shiodome is the 2nd Bldg. Google Map
- From Hammatsucho Train Station: Take the North Exit. Cross the main road, go right (east), walk 300 feet (100 metres), cross a small side street, go up Escalator on left, La Tour/Acty Shiodome is the 2nd Bldg. Google Map
