= World Trade Center (Tokyo) =

Skyscraper in Tokyo, Japan

World Trade Center Building
- 世界貿易センタービルディング
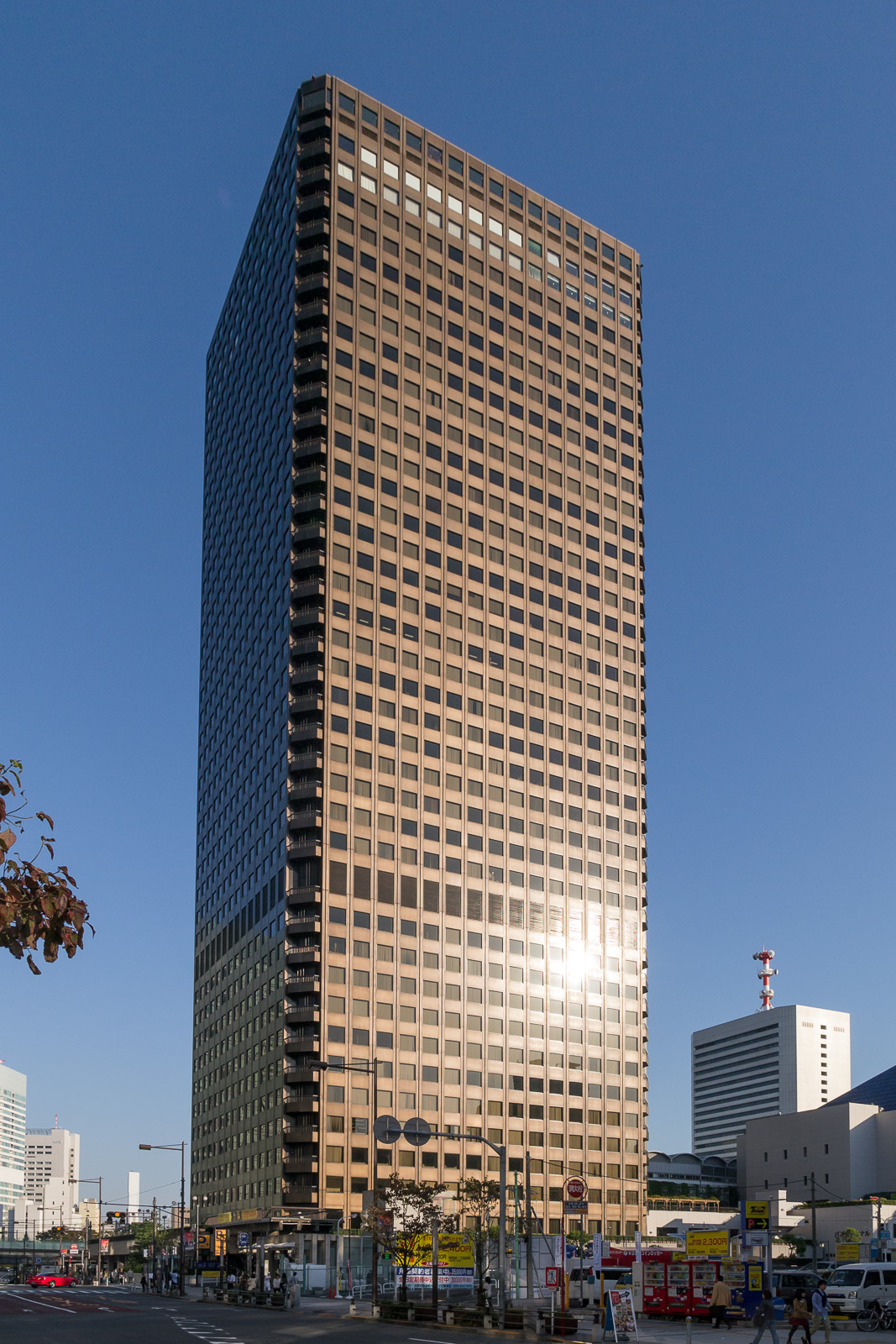
- World Trade Center Building (Tokyo)
- Interactive map of the World Trade Center Building area

General information
- Location: 2-4-1 Hamamatsu-chō, Minato-ku; Tokyo 105-6133, Japan
- Coordinates: 35.656311°N 139.756705°E
- Construction started: 1964
- Completed: 1970
- Opening: March 1970
- Demolished: August 2021 – March 2023

Height
- Roof: 162.6 meters (533 ft)
- Top floor: 152 meters (499 ft)

Technical details
- Floor count: 40 above ground 3 below ground
- Floor area: 153,841 m^{2} (1,655,930 sq ft)

Design and construction
- Architect: Nikken Sekkei
- Structural engineer: Kiyoshi Mutō
- Main contractor: Kajima Construction

World Trade Center Building (世界貿易センタービルディング) was a 40-story commercial skyscraper located in Hamamatsuchō, Minato, Tokyo. Completed in 1970, the building was one of Japan's earliest skyscrapers. Upon its completion, the 163-meter-tall WTC Building took the title of Japan's tallest skyscraper from the Kasumigaseki Building; it retained this title until Keio Plaza Hotel's North Tower was completed one year later.

The building was home to the World Trade Center Tokyo, a member of the World Trade Centers Association. It was primarily used for office space, but also included retail stores and restaurants. The building's top floor was a visitor observatory. The building was connected to the Toei Subways's Daimon Station and Hamamatsuchō Station, being serviced by two JR East lines and the Tokyo Monorail.

== Office tenants ==
The building served as the headquarters of KYB Corporation, a global automotive company.

== Redevelopment ==
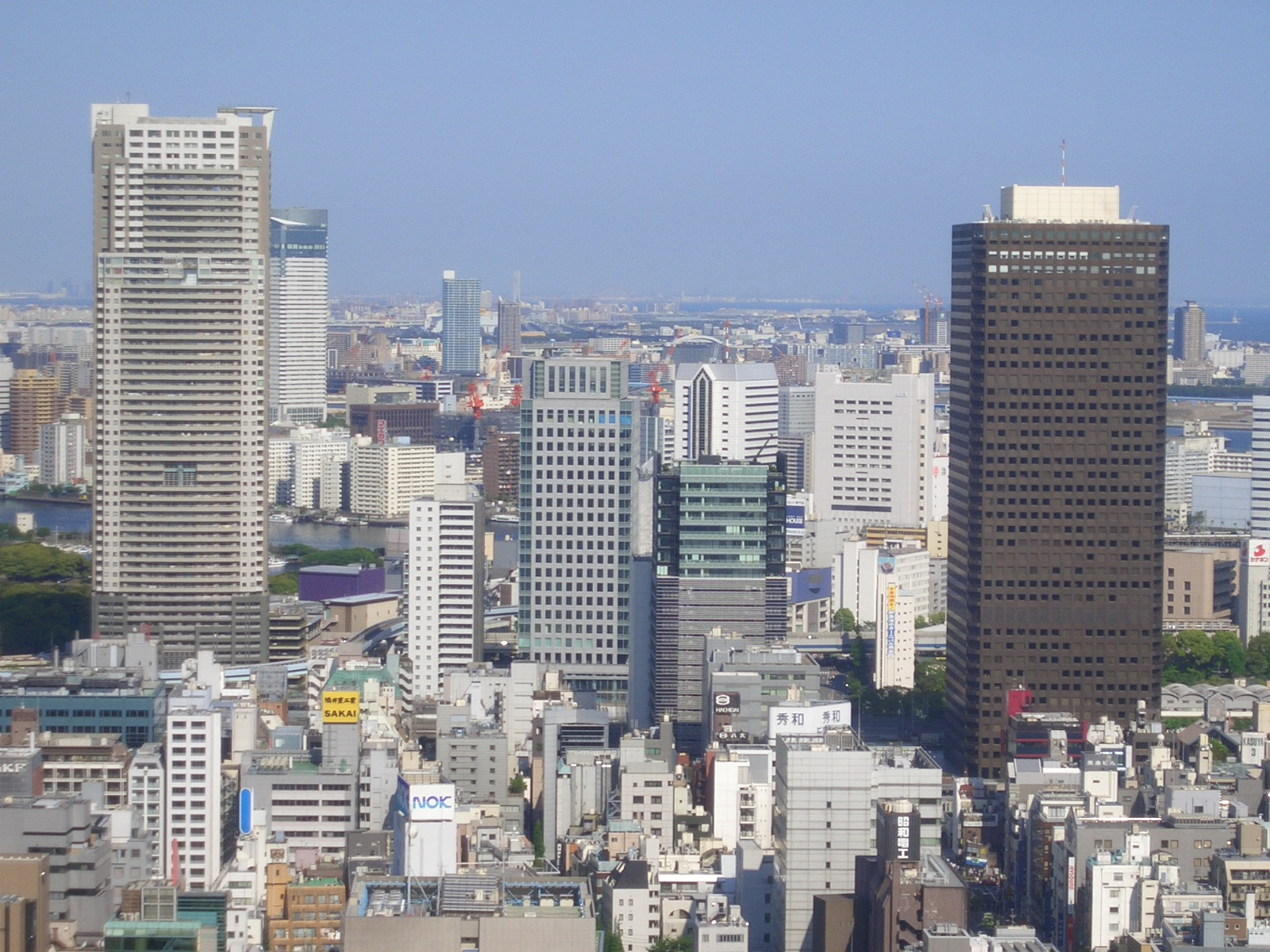
Around the World Trade Center in Tokyo

In March 2013, about 3.2 hectares of "Hamamatsucho 2-chome 4 district" on the west side of Hamamatsucho station was declared by a city planning decision as a special urban regeneration district . [10] In response, the construction of five new buildings is planned, including the reconstruction of the entire area. The demolition of a 152-meter skyscraper is the largest ever.

In 2014, the World Trade Center Building was purchased by the Nippon Life Insurance Company, which plans to demolish the building to allow for the construction of a new office building on the site.

Development was started separately for District A, District B, and District C. In District A, the South Building of the World Trade Center Building (3 floors below ground, 39 floors above ground) was completed in March 2021. The main building and bus terminal of the same building are scheduled to be completed in March 2017, a new Tokyo Monorail Hamamatsucho Station in May 2027. The B Street District Nippon Life Hamamatsucho Claire Tower (3 floors above the 29th floor underground) was completed in August 2018. A complex promoted by the Redevelopment Association (2 floors below ground, 46 floors above ground) is scheduled to be completed in December 2026 and will be constructed in District C. This building would later be called the World Trade Center North.

By the end of June 2021, the 152-metre-tall (499 ft) building was closed prior to its demolition, the process of which commenced in August 2021 and finished in March 2023. It is now the tallest demolished building in Japan, surpassing the 138-metre Akasaka Prince Hotel (1982–2013).

== See also ==
- List of tallest buildings and structures in Tokyo

Records
| Preceded by Kasumigaseki Building | Tallest building in Japan; 163 m (533 ft); 1970–1971 | Succeeded by Keio Plaza Hotel North Tower |
| Preceded by Kasumigaseki Building | Tallest building in Tokyo; 163 m (533 ft); 1970–1971 | Succeeded by Keio Plaza Hotel North Tower |
