= Mount Nagata =

Mount Nagata may refer to:

- Mount Nagata (Japan), a mountain on the island of Yakushima
- Mount Nagata (Antarctica), a mountain in the Explorers Range
