= Hamamatsuchō =

Hamamatsuchō 浜松町
- District
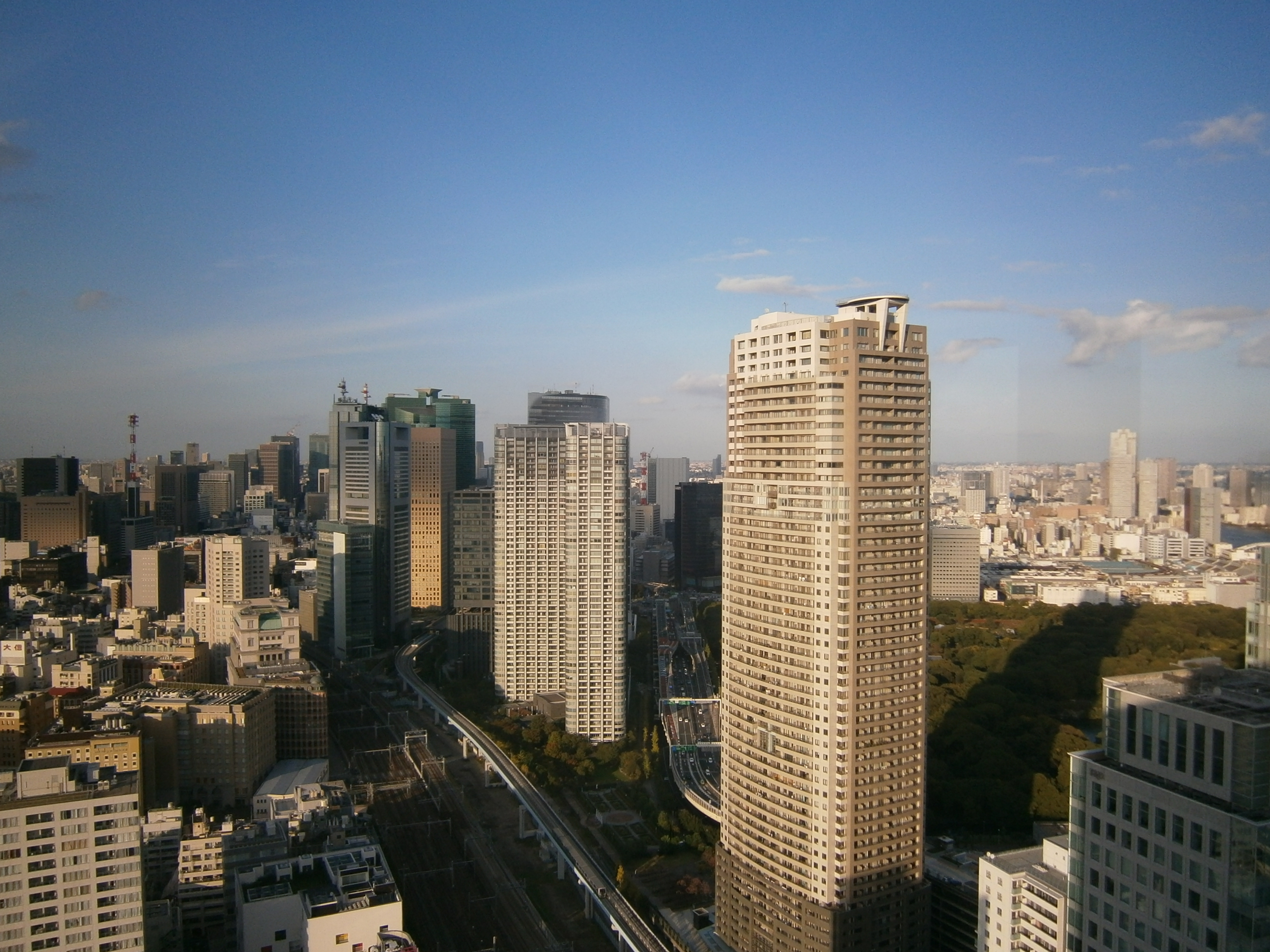
- 2-chōme
- Interactive map of Hamamatsuchō
- Coordinates: 35.657767°N 139.756893°E
- Country: Japan
- City: Tokyo
- Ward: Minato
- Area: Shiba Area

Area
  - Total: 0.19 ha (0.47 acres)

Population (2019)
  - Total: 2,284
  - Density: 12,021/km^{2} (31,130/sq mi)
- Time zone: UTC+9 (JST)
- Postal code: 105-0013
- Area code: 03

Hamamatsuchō (浜松町) is a business and commercial district south of Shinbashi district in Minato ward in Tokyo, Japan. Hamamatsucho is located along the Tokyo Bay, with views of Odaiba and the Rainbow Bridge.

== Companies based in Hamamatsuchō ==
- KYB Corporation

== Places in Hamamatsucho ==
- Hamamatsuchō Station - Served by the JR Yamanote Line, Keihin Tōhoku Line, and the Tokyo Monorail. The latter links Hamamatsuchō with Haneda Airport.
- There is a working replica of the Manneken Pis sculpture at Hamamatsuchō Station, which is dressed by station workers in various costumes at different times of year.
- Kyū Shiba Rikyū Garden
- World Trade Center Building

== Transportation ==
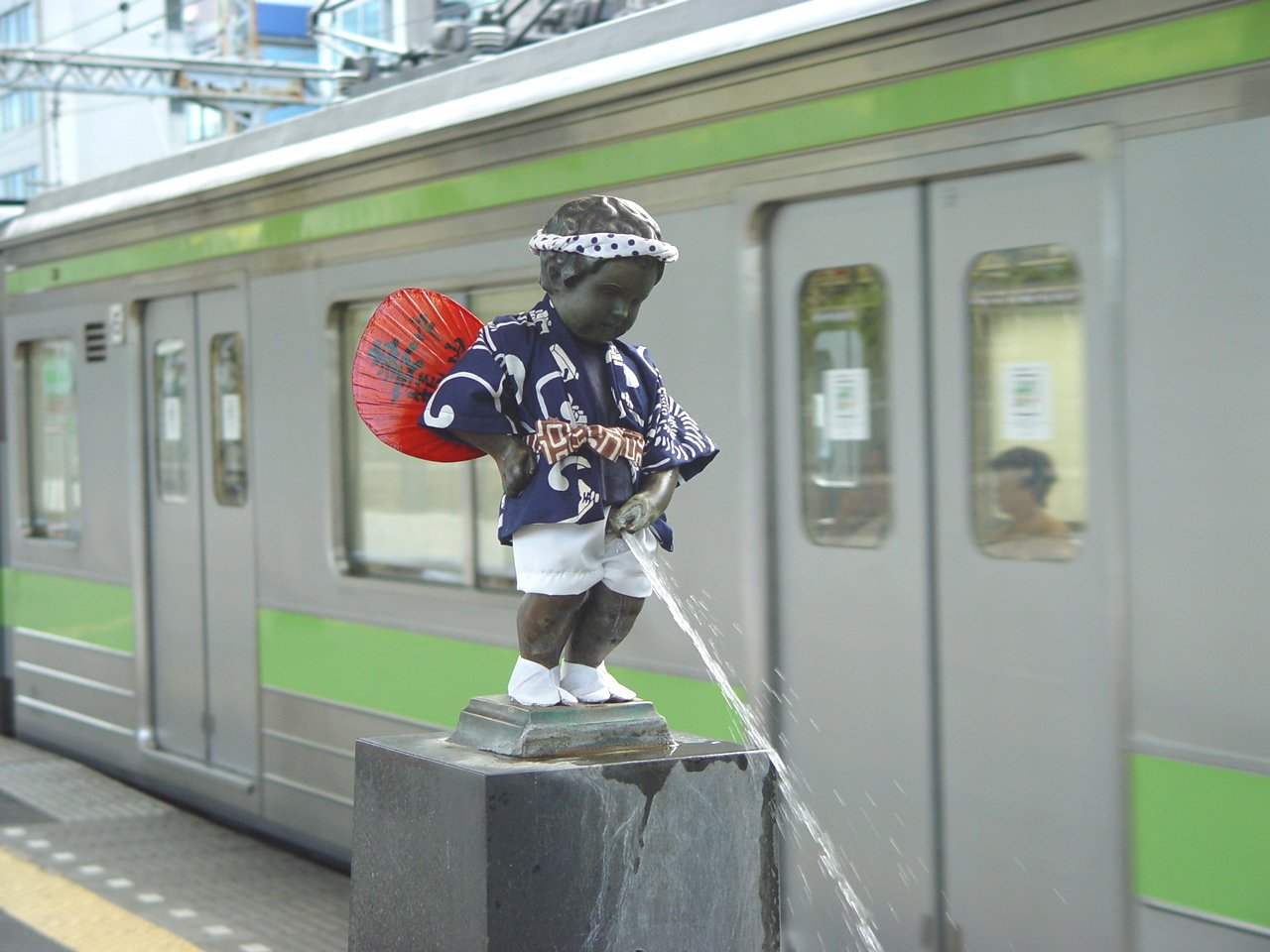
A Japanese variant of Manneken Pis at Hamamatsucho Station

=== Public transport ===
- JR East
  - Hamamatsuchō
    - Yamanote Line
    - Keihin–Tōhoku Line
- Tokyo Monorail
  - Hamamatsuchō
    - Haneda Airport Line
- Toei Subway
  - Daimon
    - Asakusa Line
    - Ōedo Line

== Education ==
Minato City Board of Education operates public elementary and junior high schools.

Hamamatsuchō 1-2-chōme are zoned to Onarimon Elementary School (御成門小学校) and Onarimon Junior High School (御成門中学校).

== Gallery ==
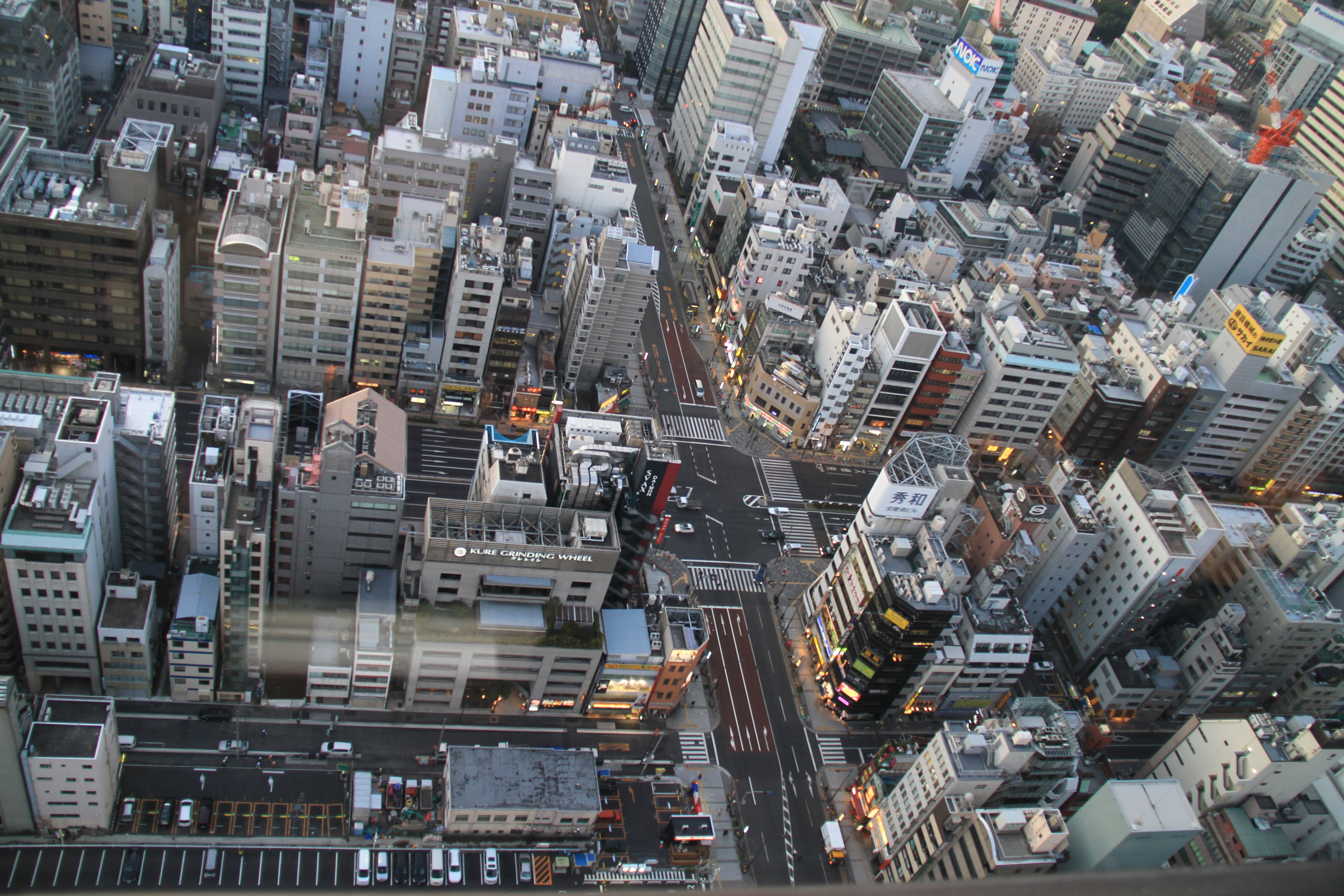
Looking down at Hamamatsucho

Skyscrapers
