= Mount Nagata (Japan) =

Mountain on the island of Yakushima, Japan

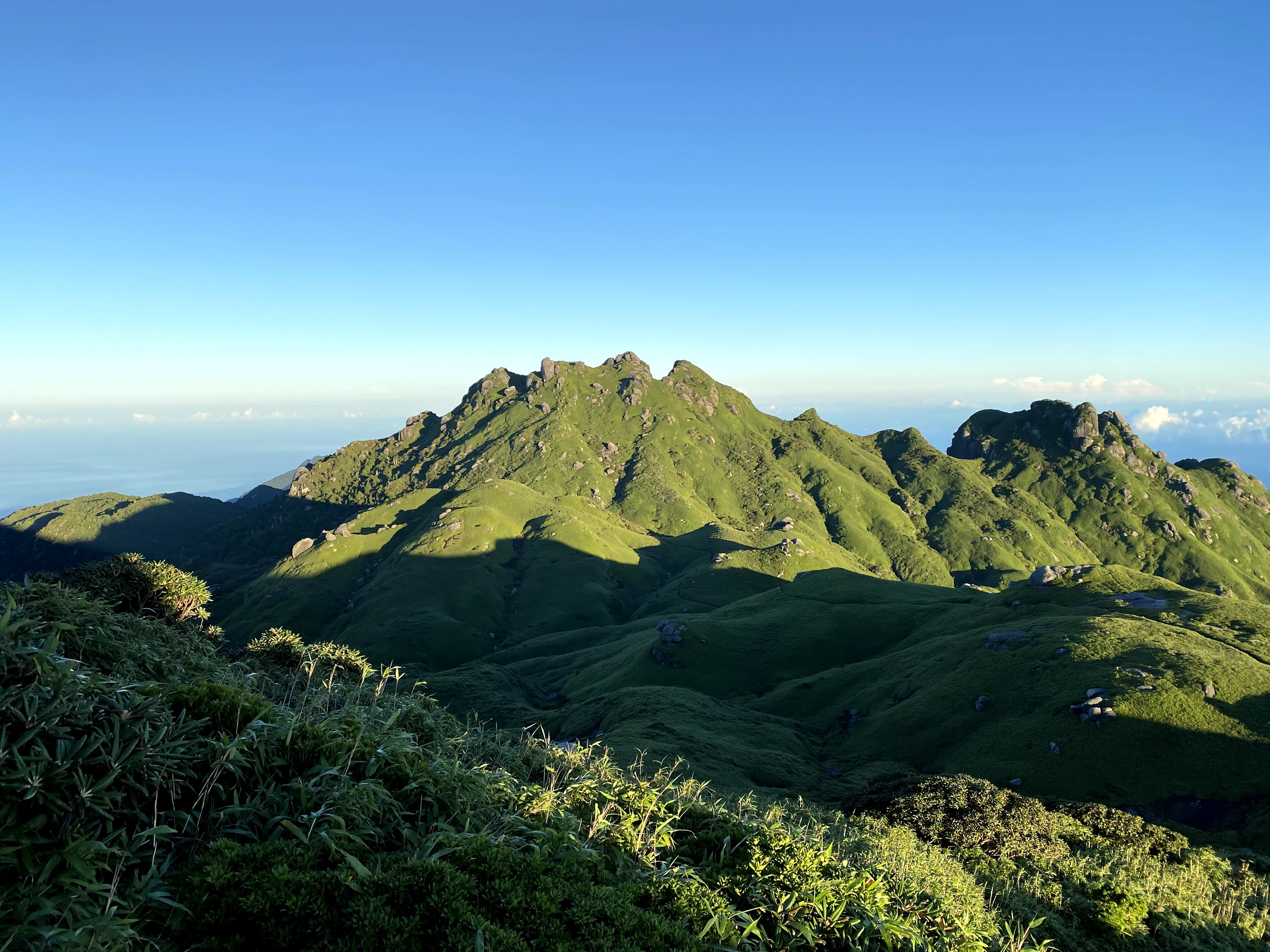
- Mount Nagata seen from Mount Miyanoura

Highest point
- Elevation: 1,886 m (6,188 ft)
- Listing: List of mountains and hills of Japan by height
- Coordinates: 30°20′34.001″N 130°29′33.000″E

Naming
- Native name: 永田岳 (Japanese)

Geography
- Location: Kagoshima Prefecture, Japan

Climbing
- Easiest route: Hike

Mount Nagata (永田岳, Nagata-dake) is a mountain on the island of Yakushima in Kagoshima Prefecture, Japan. At an altitude of 1,886 m (6,188 ft), it is the second highest peak of Yakushima and the Kyushu region after Mount Miyanoura.

Inō Tadataka's map of Yakushima refers to Mt. Nagata as Mt. Gongen (権現岳, gongen-dake)

Locals have traditionally made biannual pilgrimages to the summit of Mt. Nagata in the fall and spring. In 1722, a hokora (a type of miniature Shinto shrine) was constructed on the mountain's summit.

In the 1480s, the Buddhist priest Nichizō Shōnin retreated to a cave atop Mt. Nagata where he recited the Lotus Sutra for seven days. Since then, the native kami of the Shinto religion, Hikohohodemi no Mikoto, has been venerated as a manifestation of the Buddhist mountain deity Ippon Hoju Daigongen. This fusion of an indigenous Shinto deity with an introduced Buddhist deity is an example of Shinbutsu-shūgō.

The area near the summit is covered with Yakushima bamboo grass, dotted with Yakushima rhododendrons. At lower elevations Daphniphyllum teijsmannii and Farfugium japonicum can be seen.

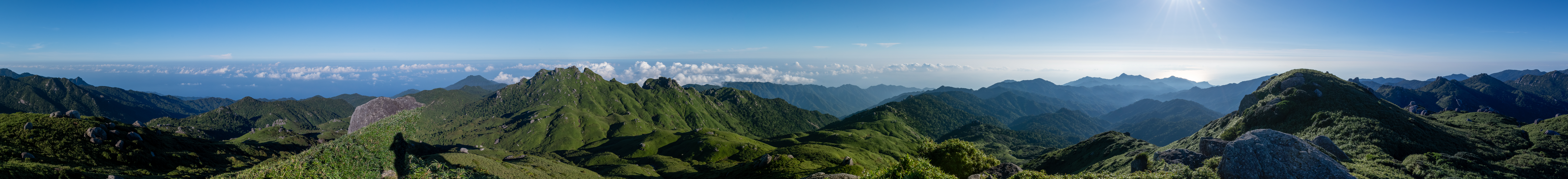
Panorama from Mount Miyanoura with Mount Nagata slightly left of center
