= Nichizō Shōnin =

Nichizō Shōnin (日増上人) was a Buddhist priest who spread the teachings of the Lotus Sutra to the island of Yakushima in southern Japan. In 1488 he founded the temple of Kuhonji (久本寺). Due to his missionary activities all of the temples on the island transitioned to the Nichiren school of Buddhism.

In the 1480s, Nichizō retreated to a cave atop Mount Nagata where he recited the Lotus Sutra for seven days. Since then, the native kami of the Shinto religion, Hikohohodemi no Mikoto, has been venerated as a manifestation of the Buddhist mountain deity Ippon Hoju Daigongen. This fusion of the indigenous Shinto religion with the introduced Buddhism religion is known as Shinbutsu-shūgō.
