= Hamamatsuchō Station =

Railway and monorail station in Tokyo, Japan

Coordinates: 35.655230°N 139.757627°E

HMCJK23 JY28 MO01 Hamamatsuchō Station 浜松町駅
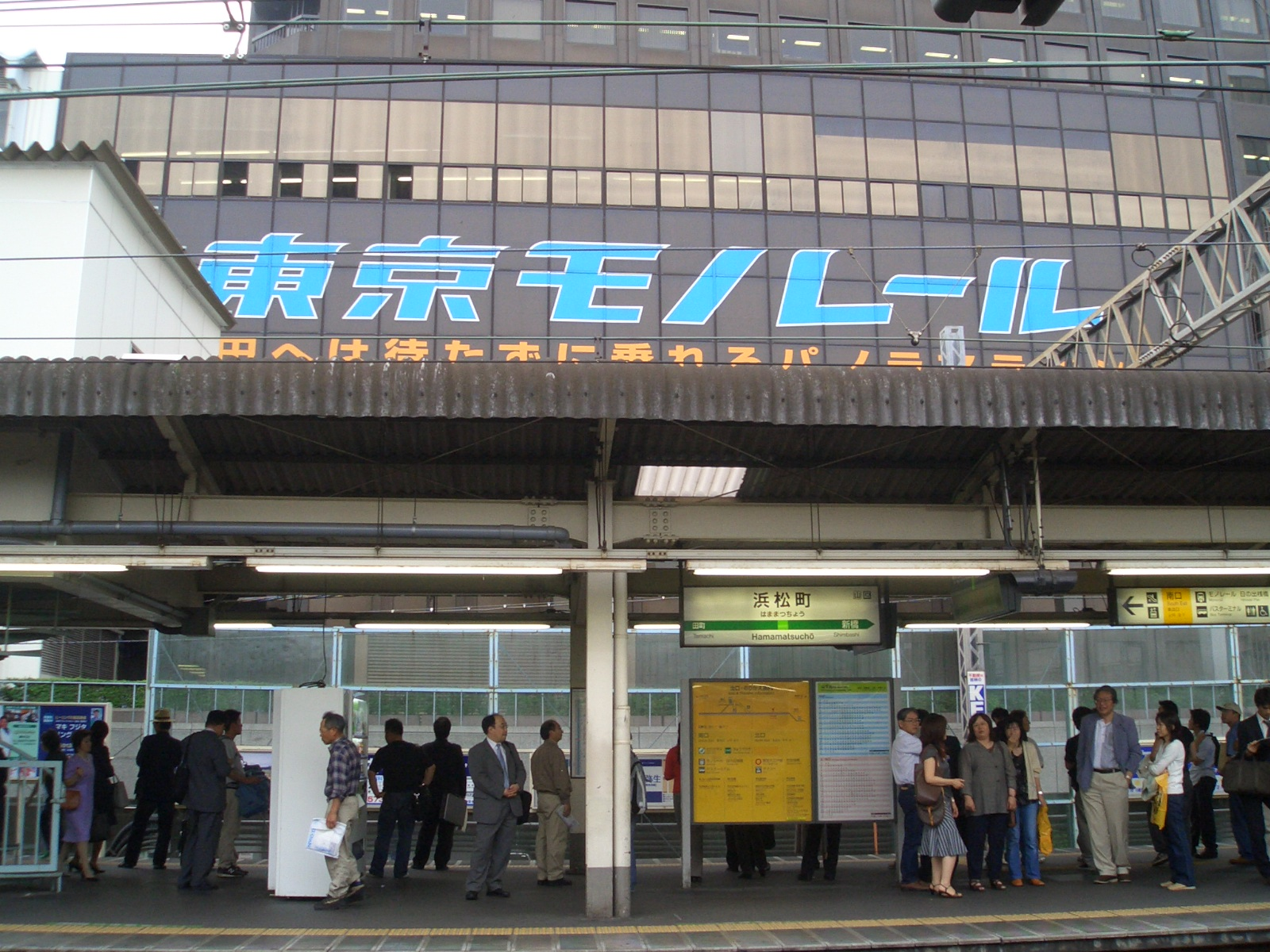
- Hamamatsucho Station

General information
- Location: 1-3-1 Kaigan District, Minato City, Tokyo; Japan
- Operator: JR East; Tokyo Monorail
- Lines: Keihin–Tōhoku Line; Yamanote Line; Tokyo Monorail Haneda Airport Line

Construction
- Structure type: Ground level (Keihin-Tōhoku and Yamanote Lines); Elevated (Tokyo Monorail)

Other information
- Station code: JK23; JY28; MO-01

History
- Opened: 16 December 1909; 116 years ago

Passengers
- FY2024: 267,804 daily; 94,252 daily

Services
Preceding station	JR East	Following station
Tamachi JY27 Next clockwise	Yamanote Line	Shimbashi Next counter-clockwise
Tamachi JK22 towards Yokohama	Keihin–Tōhoku Line Rapid	Tokyo towards Ōmiya
Tamachi JK22 towards Yokohama	Keihin–Tōhoku Line Local	Shimbashi towards Ōmiya
Preceding station	Tokyo Monorail	Following station
Terminus	Haneda Airport Line Haneda Express	Haneda Airport Terminal 3 MO08 towards Haneda Airport Terminal 2
Terminus	Haneda Airport Line Rapid Local	Tennōzu Isle MO02 towards Haneda Airport Terminal 2
Location
- Location within Tokyo Yamanote Loop Location within Tokyo wards area Location within Japan

Hamamatsuchō Station (浜松町駅, Hamamatsuchō-eki) is a railway station in Hamamatsuchō, Minato, Tokyo, Japan, operated by East Japan Railway Company (JR East) and Tokyo Monorail.

== Lines ==
Hamamatsuchō Station is served by two JR East lines: the circular Yamanote Line and the Keihin-Tōhoku Line. All trains on these lines stop at Hamamatsuchō.

It is also the terminus of the Tokyo Monorail line to Haneda Airport. The official name of the monorail station is Monorail Hamamatsuchō Station (モノレール浜松町駅, Monorēru-Hamamatsuchō-eki).

== Station layout ==
=== JR East ===
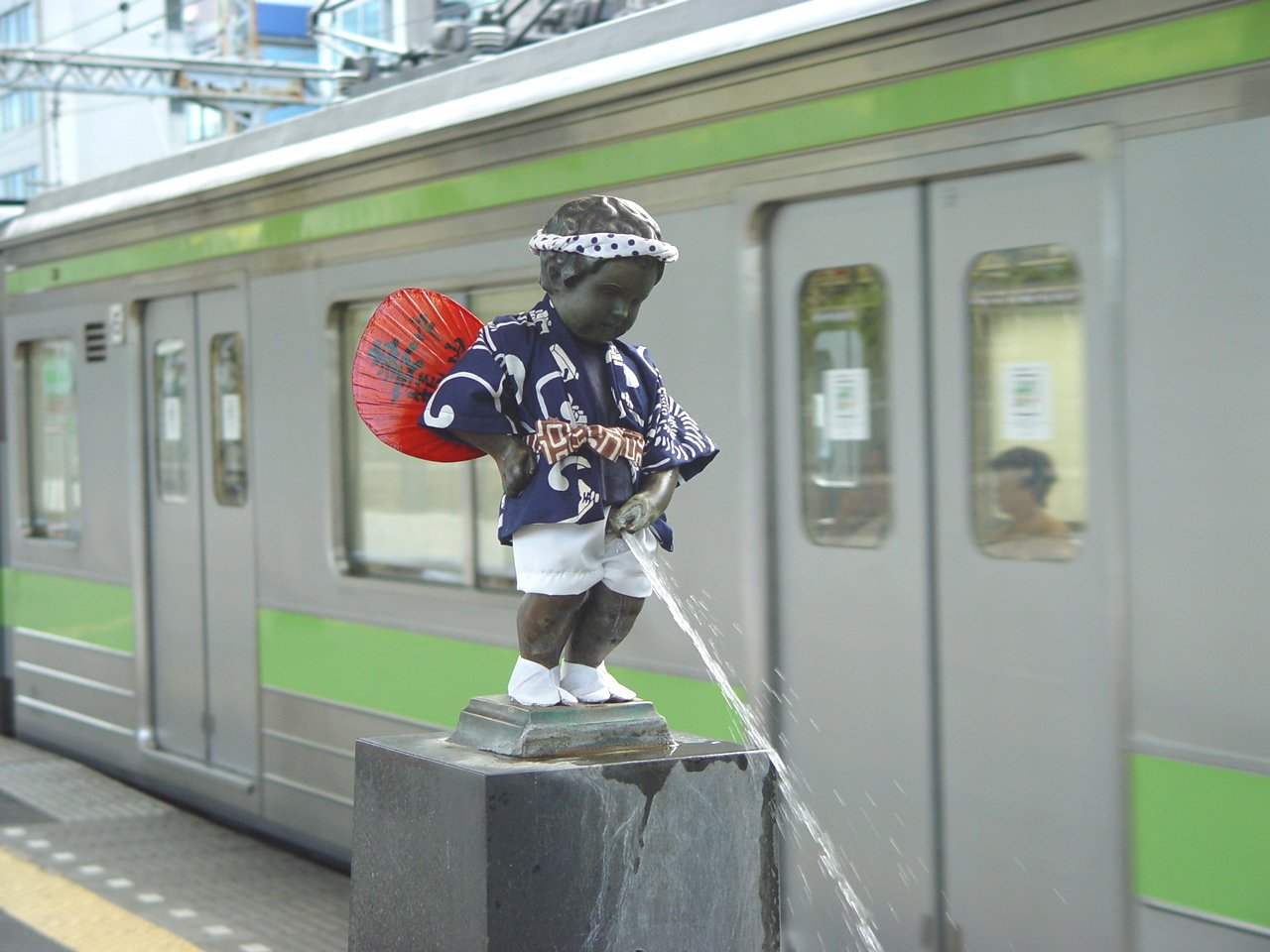
A Japanese variant of Manneken Pis on the station platform

The JR East station consists of two platforms serving four tracks, with cross-platform interchange in the direction of travel between the Yamanote line (tracks 2 and 3) and the Keihin-Tōhoku line (tracks 1 and 4).

1	Keihin-Tōhoku Line	for Tokyo, Ueno, and Ōmiya
2	Yamanote Line	for Tokyo and Ueno
3	Yamanote Line	for Shinagawa and Shibuya
4	Keihin-Tōhoku Line	for Shinagawa, Yokohama, and Ōfuna

=== Tokyo Monorail ===
The Tokyo Monorail platforms are located to the west of the JR station in a separate elevated structure. Two side platforms serve a single track, with one platform used for boarding passengers, and the other platform used for alighting passengers.

Japan's domestic airlines (JAL, ANA, Skymark Airlines, and Air Do) operate check in services for domestic flights from Haneda airport along with ticketing facilities just outside the main Monorail entrances.

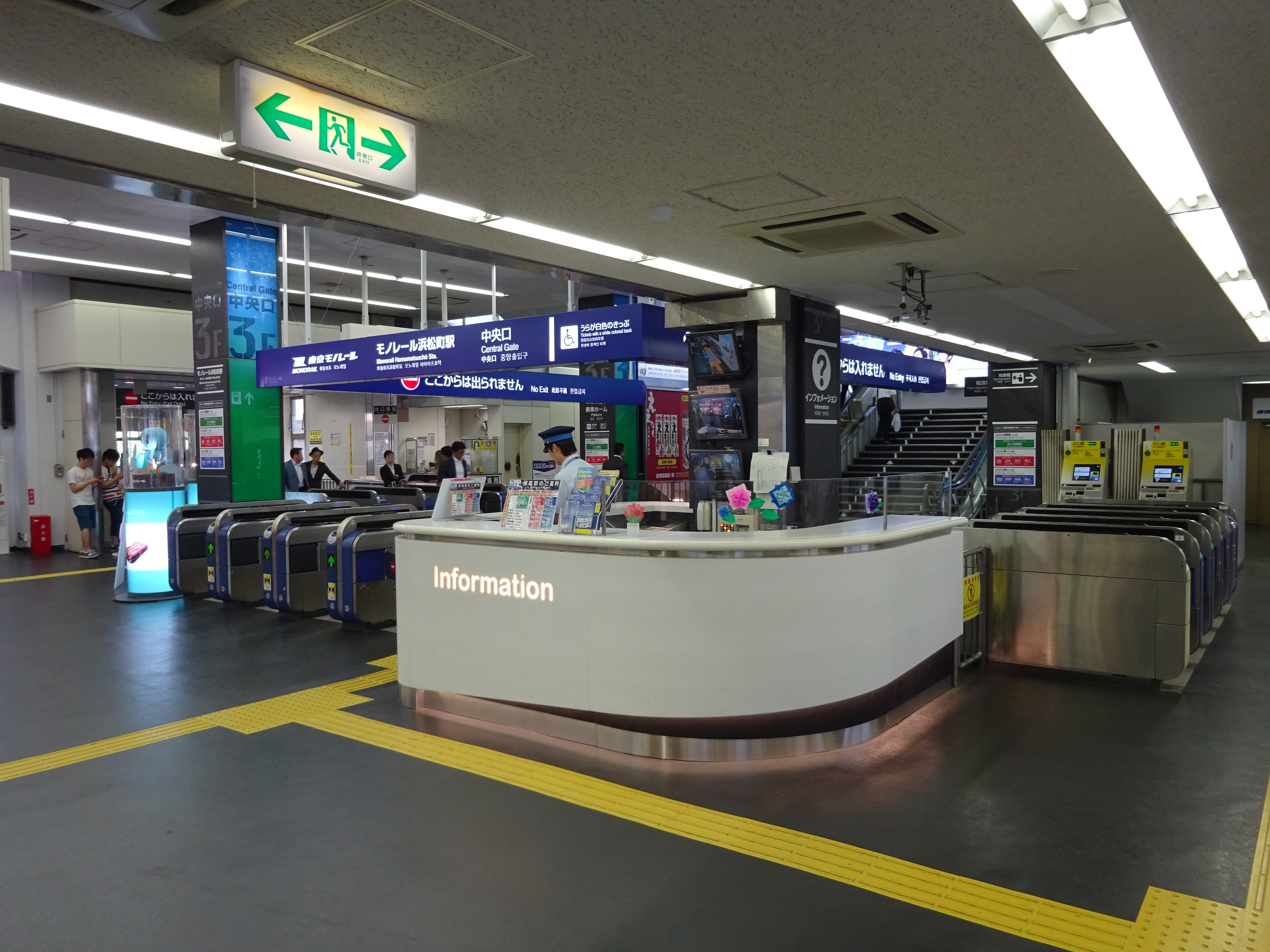
Monorail Hamamatsucho's Central gate, June 2016

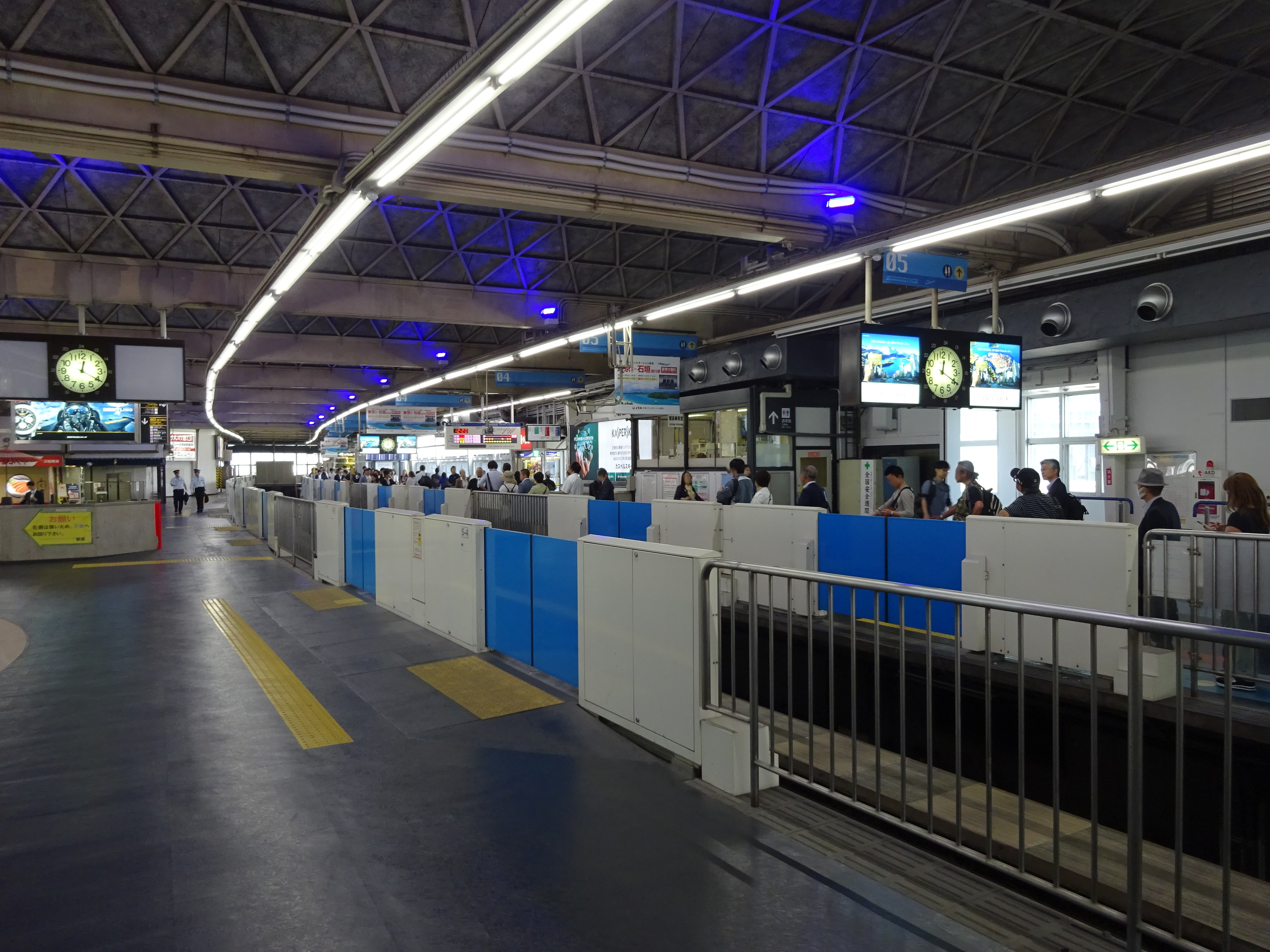
The Tokyo Monorail platforms, June 2016

== Facilities ==
- Japan Airlines at one time operated a domestic flights only ticketing facility on the third floor of the station.

== History ==
The JR station opened on December 16, 1909, as an intermediate station on the newly opened Shinagawa to Karasumori section of the Japanese National Railways.

The Tokyo Monorail station opened on September 17, 1964.

== Passenger statistics ==
In fiscal 2013, the JR East station was used by an average of 155,784 passengers daily (boarding passengers only), making it the sixteenth-busiest station operated by JR East. Over the same fiscal year, the Tokyo Monorail station was used by an average of 108,080 passengers daily (exiting and entering passengers), making it the busiest station operated by Tokyo Monorail.

The passenger figures for the JR East station (boarding passengers only) for previous years are as shown below.

Fiscal year	Daily average
2000	152,620
2005	144,085
2010	153,594
2011	151,480
2012	153,104
2013	155,784

== Surrounding area ==
- Daimon Station, served by the Toei Ōedo Line and the Toei Asakusa Line, is within easy walking distance, although some route maps do not mark them as an interchange. The 1-minute walk is fully signed and easy to locate. When arriving on a train from south, train cars at the front of the train are closest to the exit to Daimon station.
- The station is partially under and directly connected to the World Trade Center (Tokyo).
- Acty Shiodome, the fourth tallest residential building in Japan, is a 3-minute walk to the north.
- Hamarikyu Gardens - 1/2 mile north-east
- Kyu Shiba Rikyu Garden - 1/8 mile east
- Shiodome City Center Shopping Mall - 10-minute walk
- Tsukiji Fish Market - 15-minute walk
- Hato Bus Tour terminal

== See also ==
- List of railway stations in Japan
- Transport in Greater Tokyo
