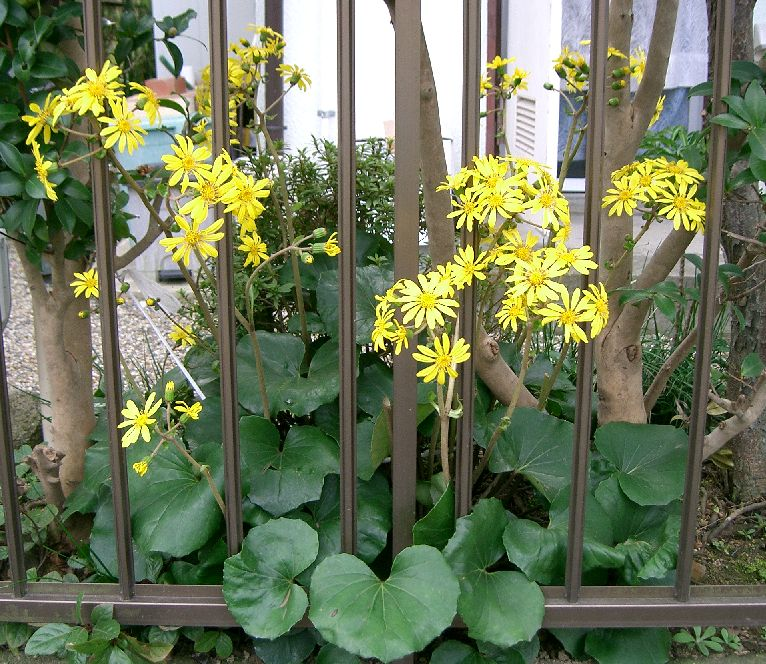
- Farfugium japonicum

Scientific classification
- Kingdom: Plantae
- Clade: Tracheophytes
- Clade: Angiosperms
- Clade: Eudicots
- Clade: Asterids
- Order: Asterales
- Family: Asteraceae
- Subfamily: Asteroideae
- Tribe: Senecioneae
- Genus: Farfugium; Lindl.

= Farfugium =

Genus of flowering plants

Farfugium is a genus of flowering plants in the family Asteraceae, native to streams and seashores in east Asia. They are rhizomatous evergreen perennials with rounded leathery leaves and bright yellow flowers in autumn and winter. Species include Farfugium japonicum, with variegated cultivars for use in horticulture.

Species

- Farfugium hiberniflorum (Makino) Kitam. - Kyushu
- Farfugium japonicum (L.) Kitam. - China, Korea, Japan (incl Nansei-shoto + Ogasawara-shoto)
