= Kyū Shiba Rikyū Garden =

Park in Minato, Tokyo, Japan

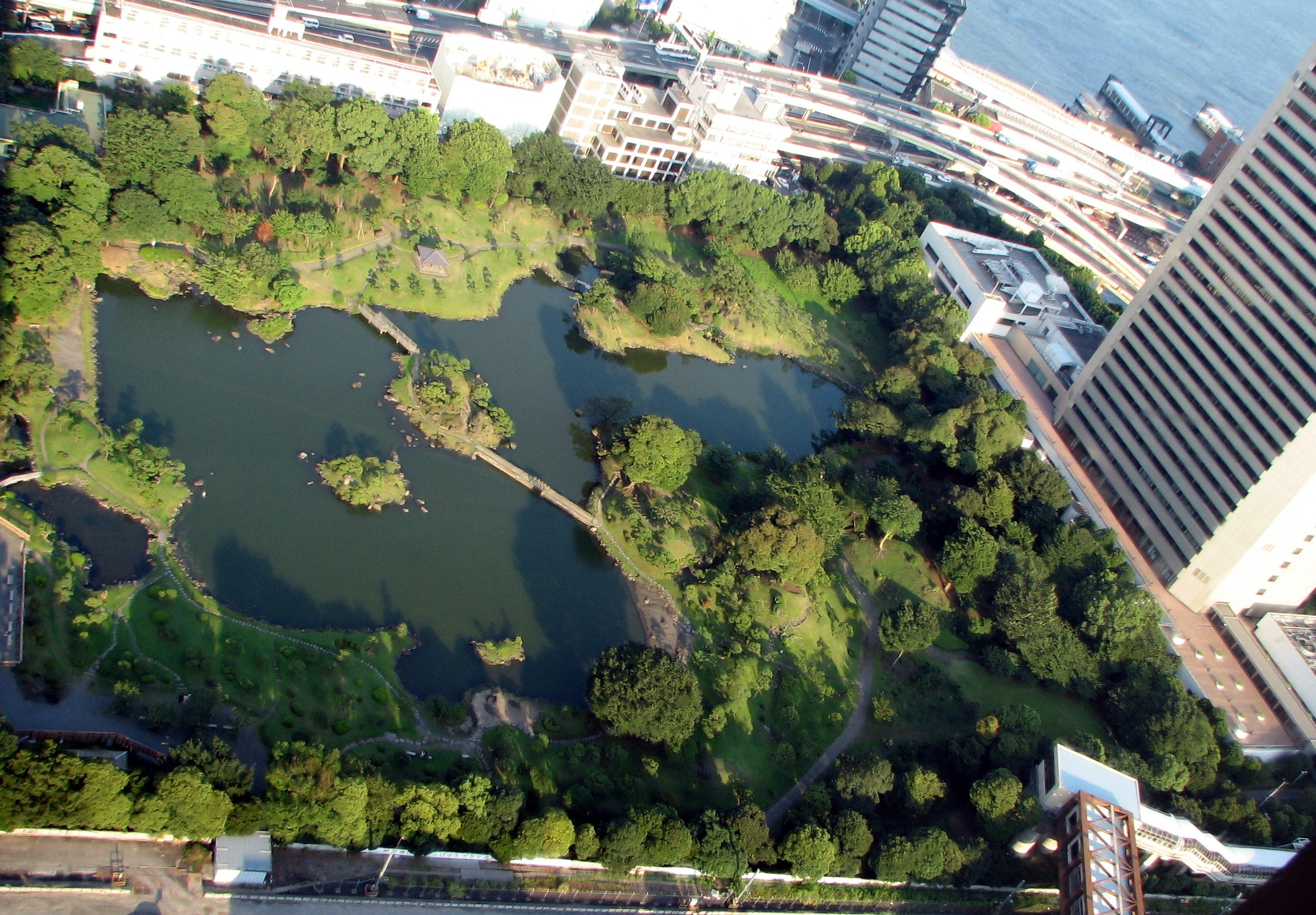
- Garden as seen from the Tokyo World Trade Center
- Interactive map of Kyū Shiba Rikyū Garden
- Location: Minato, Tokyo, Japan
- Coordinates: 35.654903°N 139.758874°E
- Area: 42,035.40 square metres (10.38717 acres)
- Created: 20 April 1924
- Public transit: Hamamatsuchō Station

The Kyū Shiba Rikyū Garden (旧芝離宮恩賜庭園), also known as Kyū Shiba Rikyū Onshi Teien ("Former Shiba Villa Imperial Gift Gardens") is a public garden and former imperial garden in Minato ward, Tokyo, Japan. The garden is one of four surviving Edo-period clan gardens in Tokyo, the others being Koishikawa Kōraku-en, Rikugi-en, and Hama Rikyu Garden. Kyū Shiba Rikyū is often regarded as the most beautifully designed garden in Tokyo, and was once called the "most beautiful" scene in Japan.

== History ==
The site of the Kyū Shiba Rikyū Garden was originally part of Tokyo Bay. The land was reclaimed between 1655 and 1658. In 1678 the site was used for the official samurai style residence of Ōkubo Tadamoto (1604–1670), member of the Ōkubo clan and an official of the Tokugawa shogunate. The residence garden was designed by garden designers from the Odawara Domain, until 1614 under the rule of daimyōs from the Ōkubo clan. The garden was then known as Rakujuen. At that time, the garden included a beach to Tokyo Bay, however, as Tokyo expanded the sea next to the garden was reclaimed, and there is no connection to the sea anymore. A remaining seawater inlet is not used.

The residence changed ownership throughout time, and around 1860 belonged to the Kishū family of the Tokugawa clan. In 1871 the ownership changed again to the Arisugawa-no-miya clan. In 1875, the Imperial Household Agency purchased the residence and it became the Shiba Detached Imperial Villa and in 1891 a European style guest house was constructed.

In the Great Kantō earthquake on September 1, 1923, all buildings and trees on the site were destroyed by fire. Subsequently, in January 1924, the site was donated to Tokyo City as part of celebrations preceding the Shōwa period (1926 to 1989) of Emperor Hirohito.

The garden was rebuilt and opened to the public on April 20, 1924. In 1979 the Government of Japan designated the garden as a place of scenic beauty and special historic interest. The size of the garden, however, was reduced to make space for the railway tracks on the north side.

== Layout ==
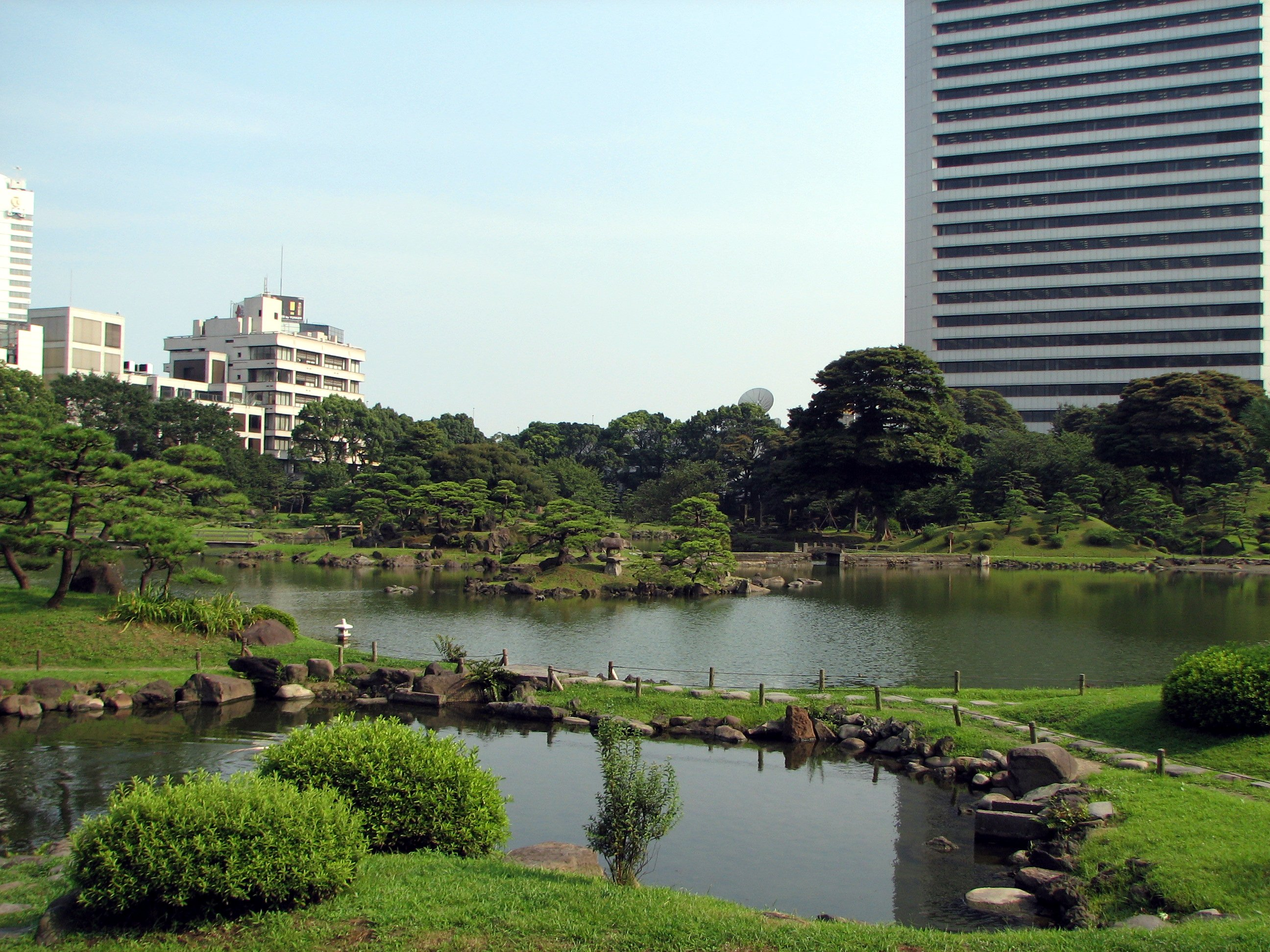
View of the garden

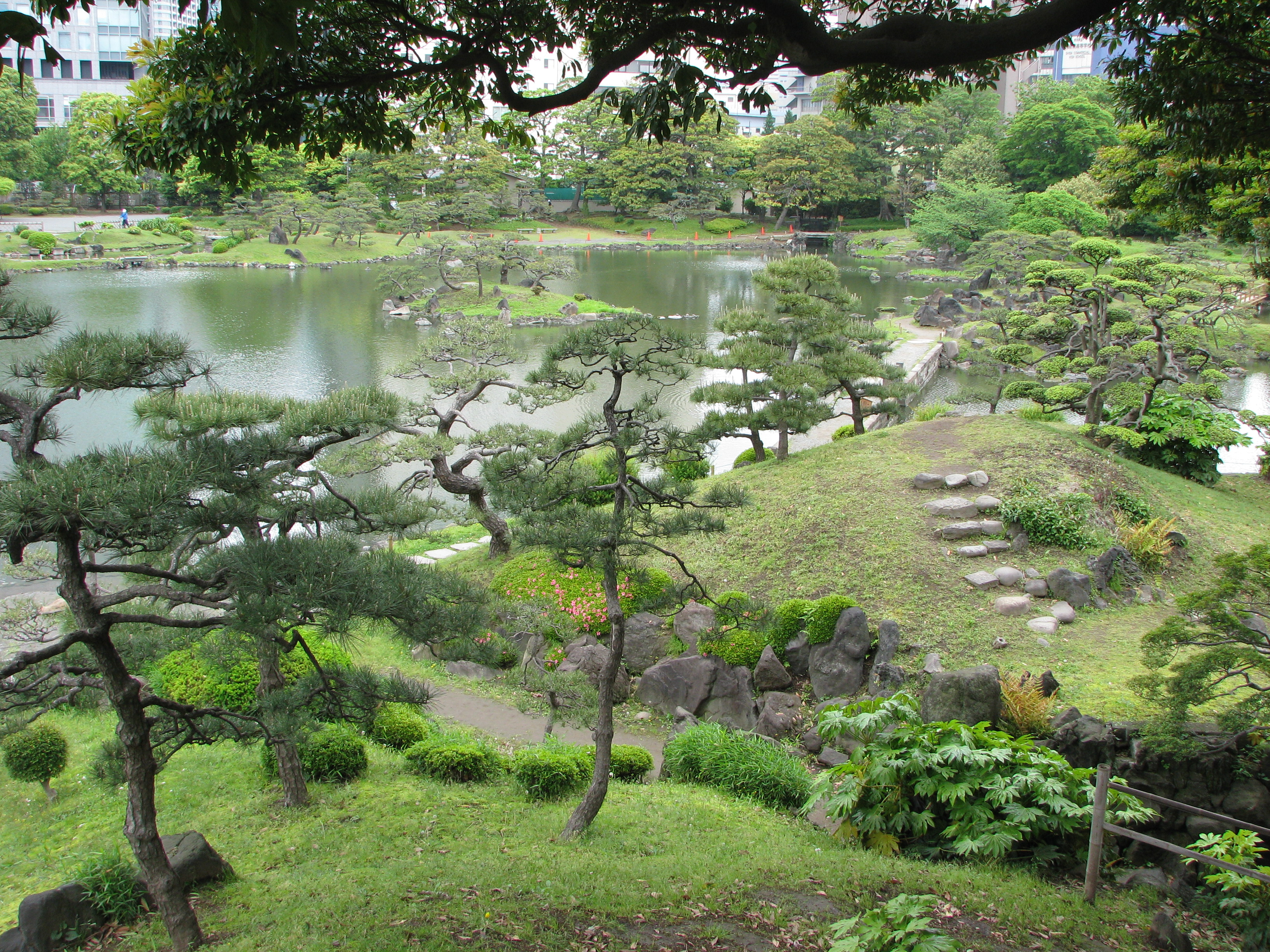
View of the pond and the islands Ukishima and Nakajima

The garden has an area of 43,070.53 m^{2}. There is a circular path around the central pond Sensui (9,000 m^{2}), which is the focus of the garden. Originally this was a salt water pond, however, as the land around was reclaimed the pond was converted to freshwater. The pond includes four islands, the central Nakajima and the smaller Ukishima, Oshima, and Yukimi-toro. Two bridges allow crossing of the pond via the larger island Nakajima. Oshima is close to the shore and can also be crossed. The inspiration for the pond originates from West Lake in Hangzhou, and the rocks on the central island represent the mountains of West Lake. One corner of the pond includes a sandy beach area named Suhama, although swimming is not recommended.

The highest point of the park is the Oyama hill, from which a dry waterfall made from stone named Karetaki flows. A stone lantern provides supposedly a good spot for snow viewing, although Tokyo rarely gets snow nowadays. Notable is also the wisteria fujidana (trellis) in the picnic area, especially when the wisteria blooms at the beginning of May.

Besides the garden office there is also a Japanese Archeryrange and a children's playground. The garden is surrounded by High-rise buildings and Skyscrapers.

== Plants and animals ==
Plants found in the garden include Japanese black pine, camphor trees, azalea, Persea, Japanese iris, Platycodon grandiflorus, Crinum latifolium, Japanese wisteria, leopard plant, and spider lily.

Wildlife include little egrets, Eastern spot-billed ducks, and carps, seasonally also tufted ducks, northern pintails, and common pochards.

== Location ==
The park is located at 1-4-1 kaigan, Minato-Ku, Tokyo 105–0022, close to the JR Hamamatsuchō Station Exit 1, or a five-minute walk from Daimon Station. The garden is also close to the Hamarikyu Gardens and the Tokyo World Trade Center.

== See also ==
- Parks and gardens in Tokyo
