= Shimbashi Station =

Railway and metro station in Tokyo, Japan

SMBJK24 JT02 JY29 JO18 U01 Shimbashi 新橋駅

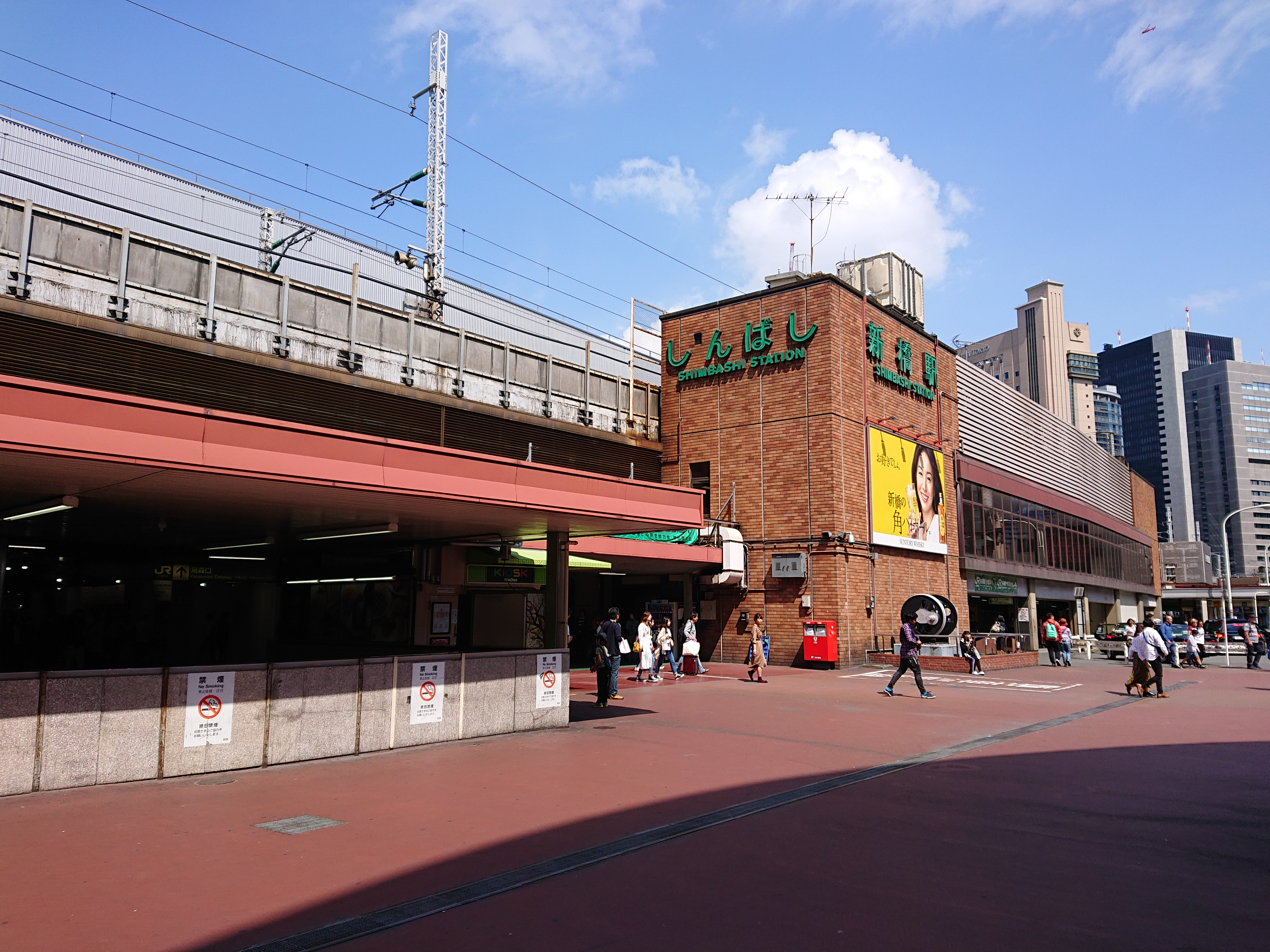
- East side of JR Shimbashi Station West Exit

General information
- Location: Minato, Tokyo; Japan
- Coordinates: 35°40′0″N 139°45′30″E
- Operator: JR East; Tokyo Metro; Toei Subway; Yurikamome

Construction
- Structure type: Elevated

History
- Opened: 16 December 1909; 116 years ago
- Former names: Karasumori (until 1914)

Passengers
- FY2024: 463,256 daily; 204,567 daily; 61,689 daily; 58,257 daily

Services
Preceding station	JR East	Following station
Hamamatsuchō next clockwise	Yamanote Line	Yūrakuchō JY30 next counter-clockwise
Hamamatsuchō towards Yokohama	Keihin–Tōhoku Line Local	Yūrakuchō JK25 towards Ōmiya
Shinagawa One-way operation	Shōnan	Tokyo Terminus
Shinagawa towards Atami	Tōkaidō Line	Tokyo Terminus
Shinagawa Terminus	Jōban Line Special Rapid	Tokyo towards Tsuchiura
Shinagawa Terminus	Jōban Line (Rapid) Rapid	Tokyo towards Toride
Shinagawa Terminus	Jōban Line Local-Futsuu	Tokyo towards Sendai
Shinagawa towards Kurihama	Yokosuka Line	Tokyo Terminus
Preceding station	Tokyo Metro	Following station
Toranomon towards Shibuya	Ginza Line	Ginza towards Asakusa
Preceding station	Toei Subway	Following station
Daimon towards Sengakuji	Asakusa Line Airport Limited Express	Nihombashi towards Oshiage
Daimon towards Nishi-magome	Asakusa Line	Higashi-ginza towards Oshiage
Preceding station	Yurikamome	Following station
Terminus	New Transit Yurikamome	Shiodome U02 towards Toyosu
Location
- Location within Tokyo Yamanote Loop Location within Tokyo wards area Location within Japan

Shimbashi station (Japanese: 新橋駅, Hepburn: Shinbashi-eki)(Literal: New Bridge Station) is a major interchange railway station in Tokyo's Minato Ward, located centrally and a 10-minute walk from the Ginza shopping district, directly south of Tokyo station.

Many train services such as limited express trains (except the Shōnan (train) service) and the JR East Keihin-Tōhoku Line rapid trains do not stop at this station. It is also served by Toei Subway's Asakusa Line and Tokyo Metro's Ginza Line. It is also relatively close to Uchisaiwaicho Station on the Toei Mita Line, located about 230 metres (750 ft) to the northwest, although it is not officially recognized as a transfer station and there is no transfer corridor between the two stations.

== Station layout ==
=== JR East ===
The JR East station consists of three surface platforms serving the Tōkaidō, Yamanote, and Keihin-Tōhoku lines, and an underground platform serving the Yokosuka Line.

==== Surface platforms ====
1	Tōkaidō Main Line	for Yokohama, Odawara, and Atami
2	Ueno-Tokyo Line	for Tokyo and Ueno (via Utsunomiya Line) for Omiya, Utsunomiya (via Takasaki Line) for Takasaki (via Jōban Line) for Toride, Mito
3	Keihin-Tōhoku Line	for Shinagawa, Yokohama, and Ofuna
4	Yamanote Line	for Shinagawa, Shibuya, and Shinjuku
5	Yamanote Line	for Tokyo, Ueno, and Ikebukuro
6	Keihin-Tōhoku Line	for Tokyo, Ueno, and Ōmiya

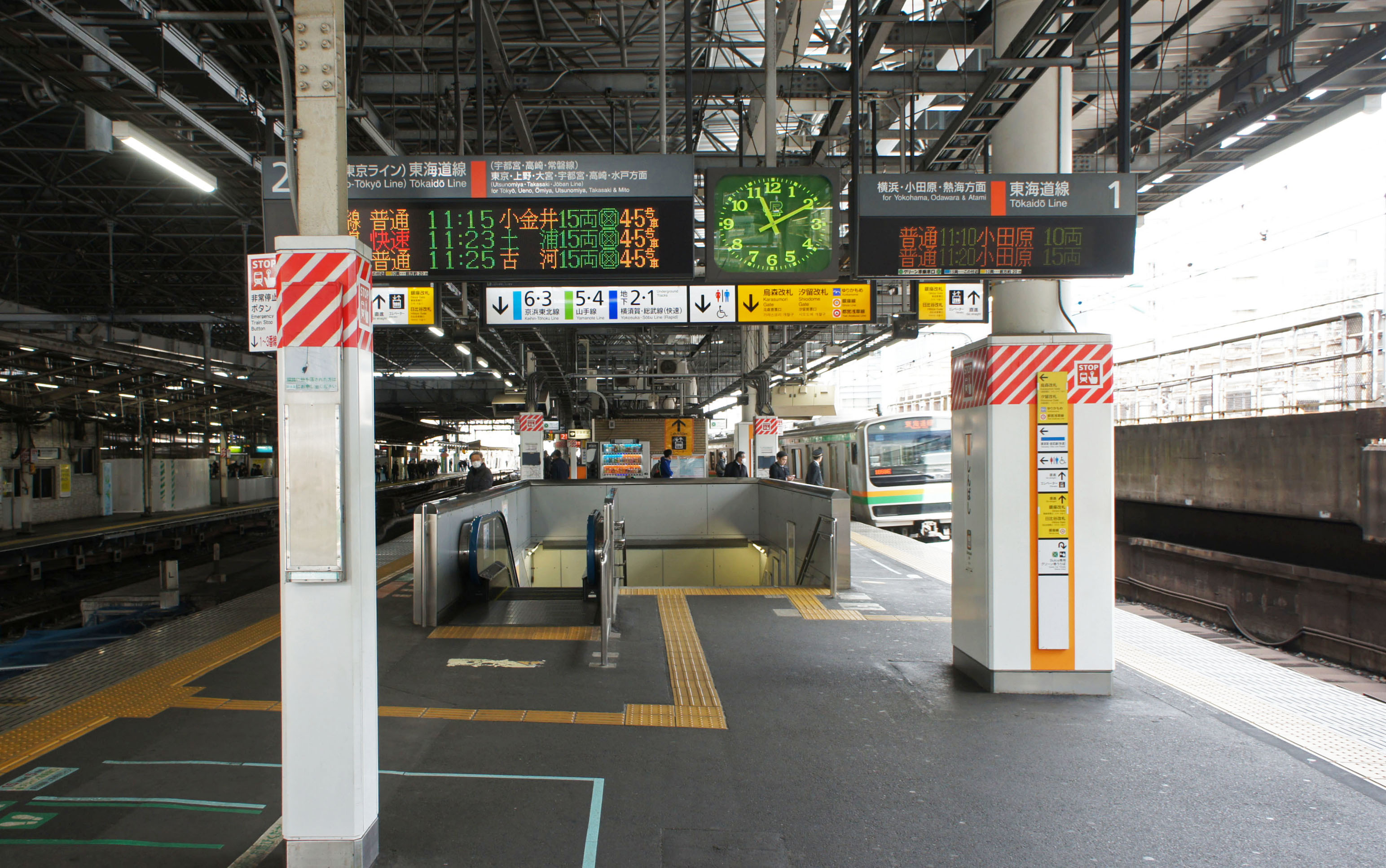
Platforms 1 and 2

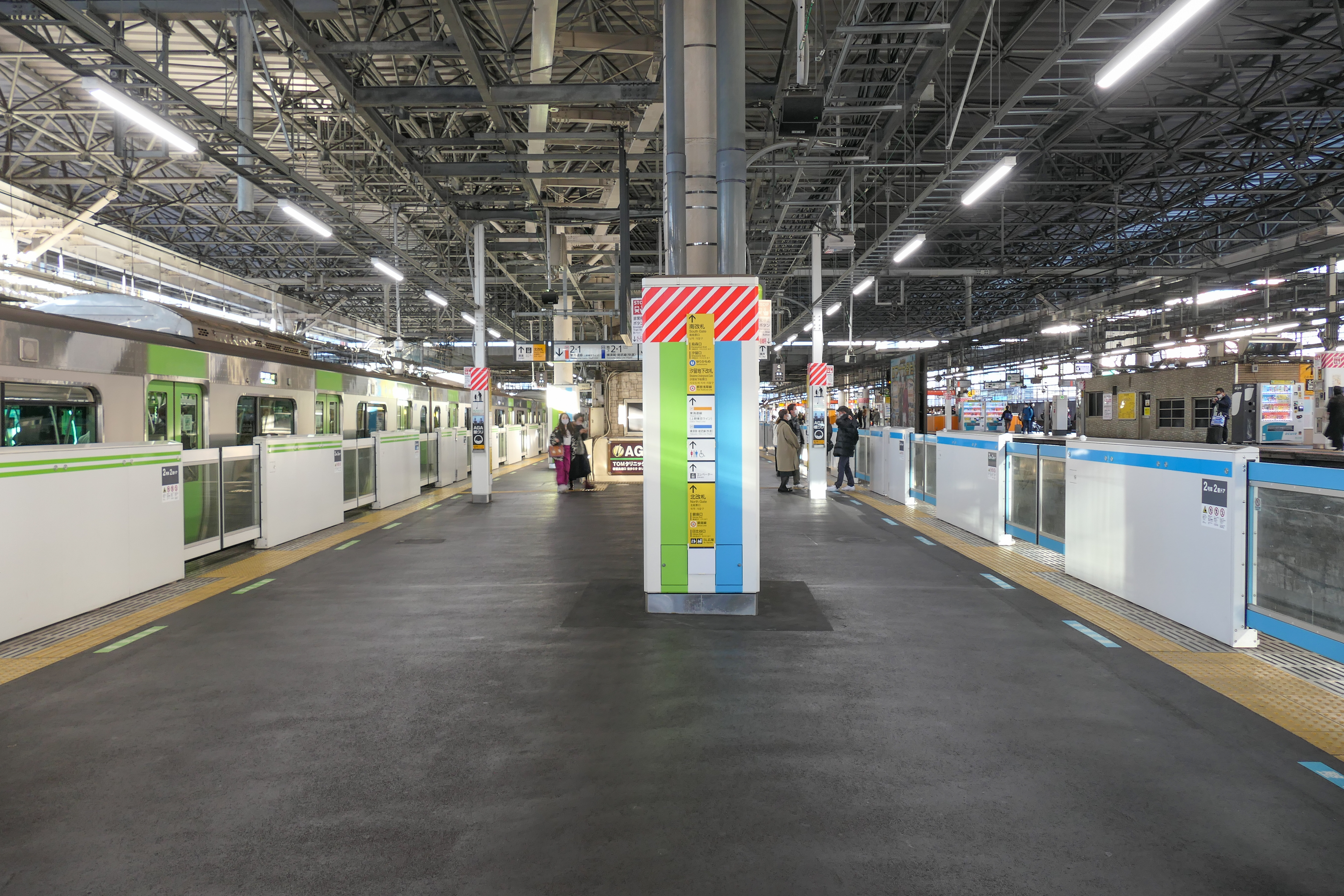
Platforms 3 and 4

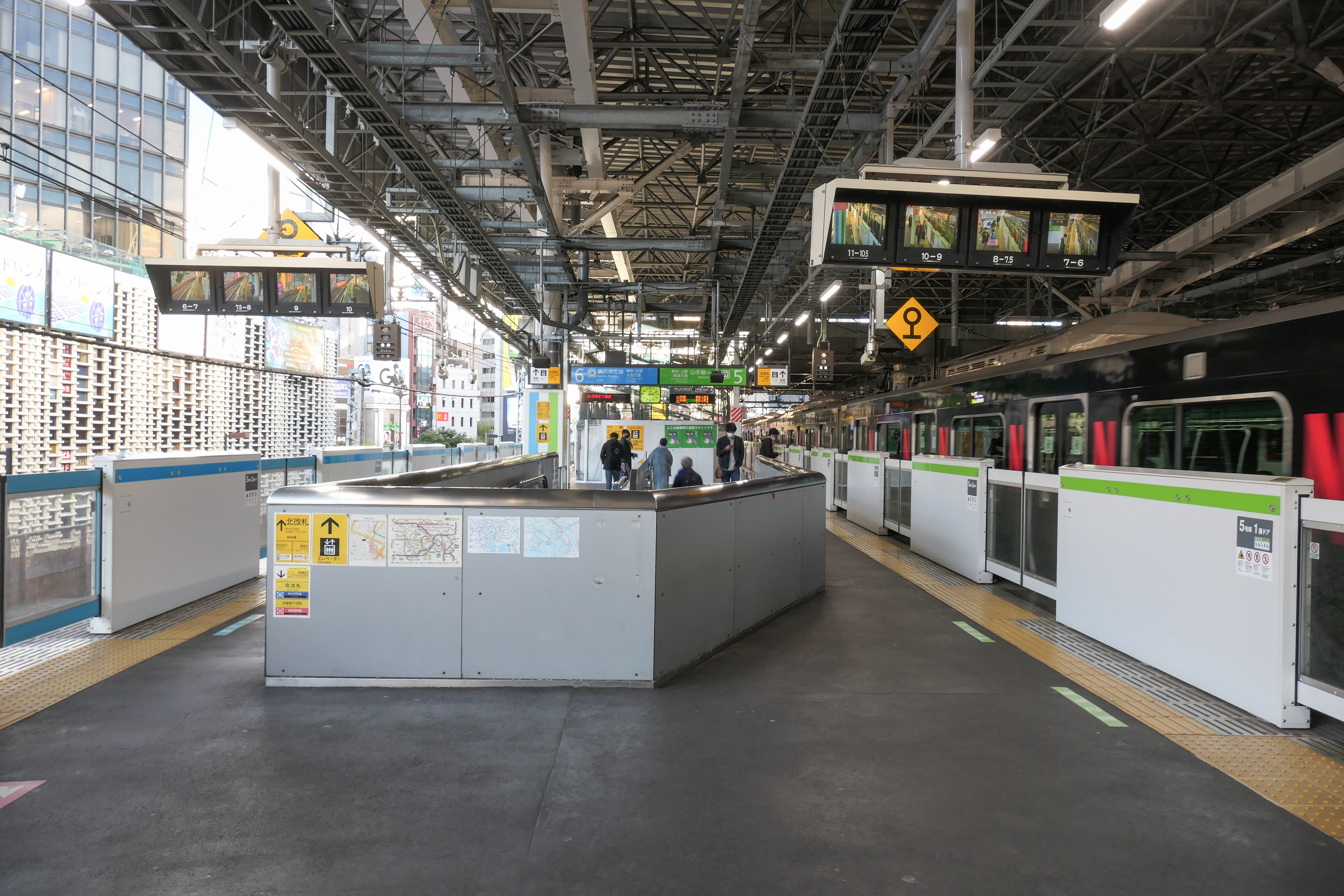
Platforms 5 and 6

==== Underground platform ====
1	Yokosuka Line	for Yokohama, Ofuna, and Kurihama
2	Yokosuka Line	for Tokyo, Funabashi, and Chiba

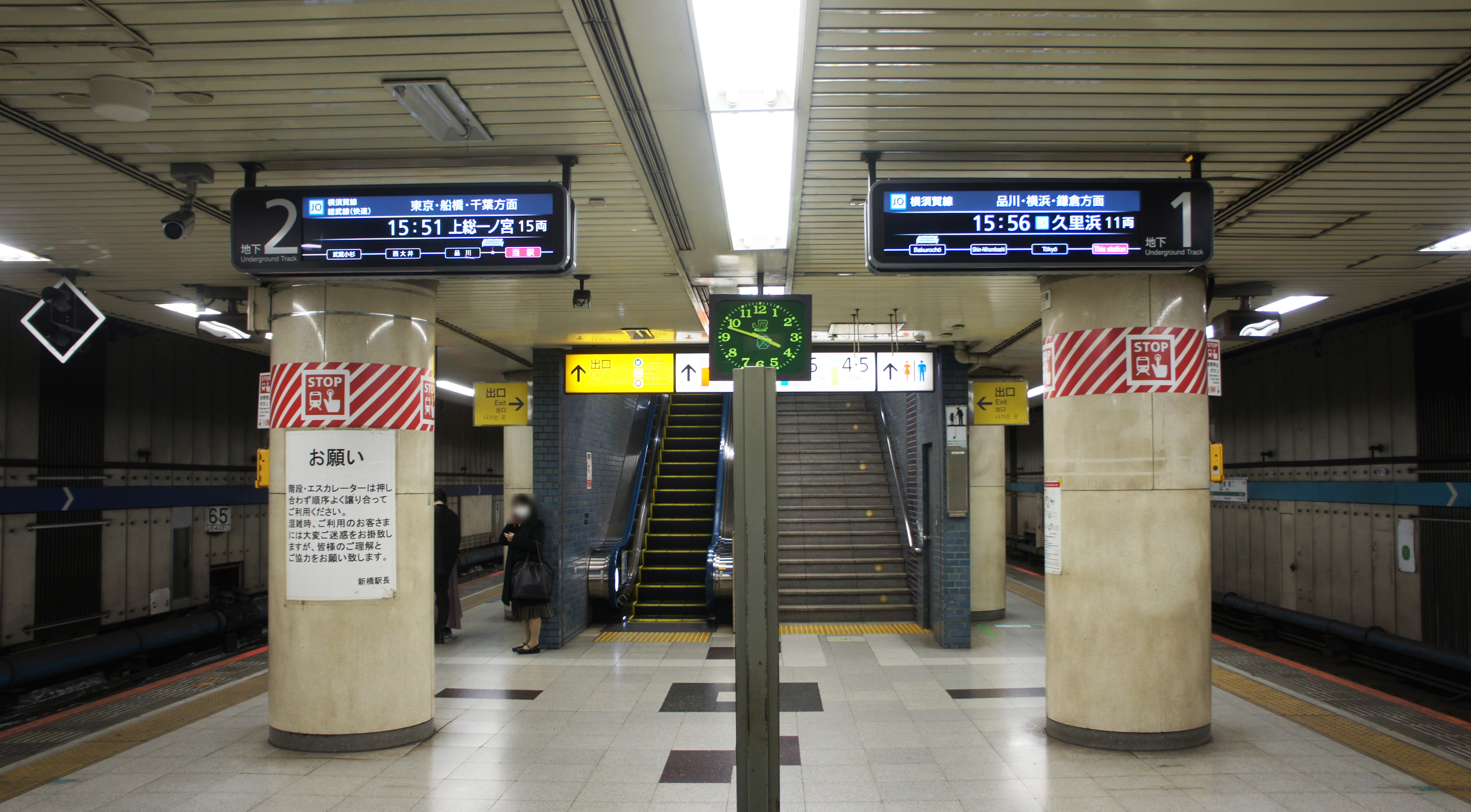
Yokosuka Line platforms

=== Tokyo Metro ===
Tokyo Metro operates in an underground station with two side platforms serving the Tokyo Metro Ginza Line.

1	Ginza Line	for Akasaka-mitsuke and Shibuya
2	Ginza Line	for Ginza, Ueno, and Asakusa

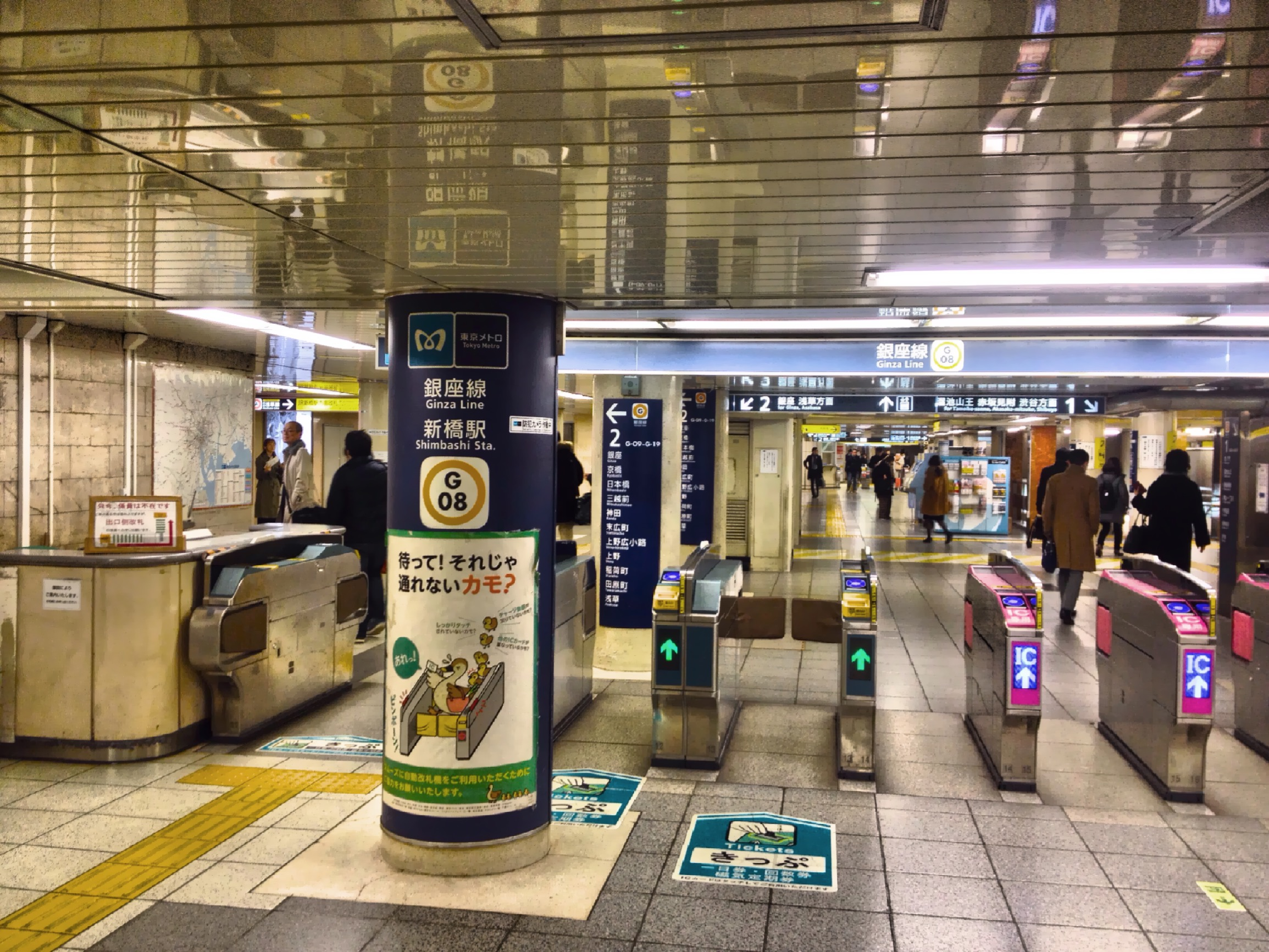
Ticket gates

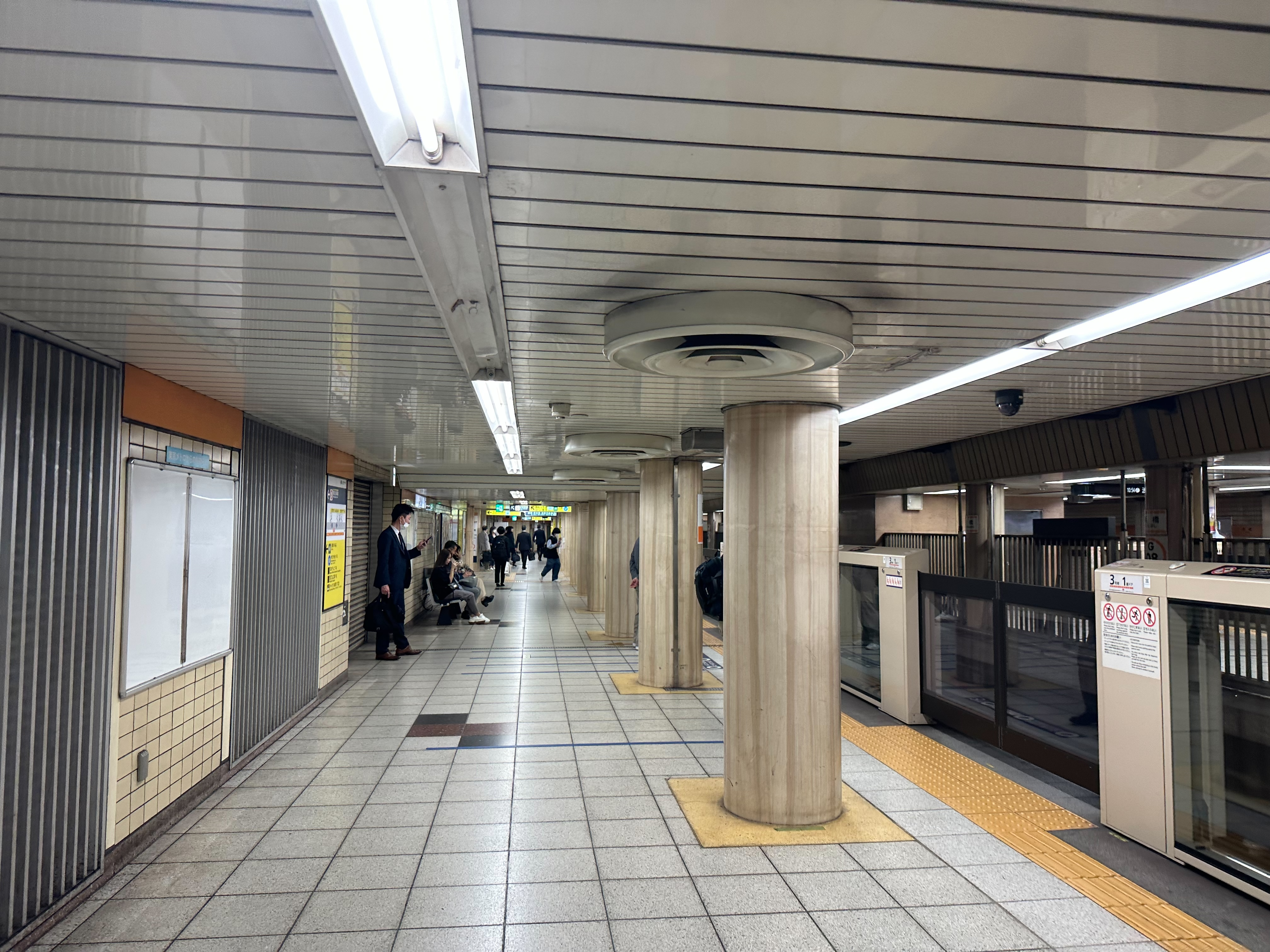
Platform 2

=== Tokyo Metropolitan Bureau of Transportation (Toei) ===
Toei operates in an underground station with two side platforms serving the Toei Asakusa Line.

1	Asakusa Line	for Sengakuji and Nishi-Magome; Keikyu Main Line for Haneda Airport Terminal 1·2 and Misakiguchi
2	Asakusa Line	for Nihombashi and Oshiage; Keisei Main Line for Aoto, Keisei Takasago, Keisei Sakura, Keisei Narita, and Narita Airport (Terminal 2·3 and Terminal 1); Hokusō Line for Imba Nihon-idai; Narita Sky Access Line for Narita Airport; Shibayama Railway Line for Shibayama-Chiyoda

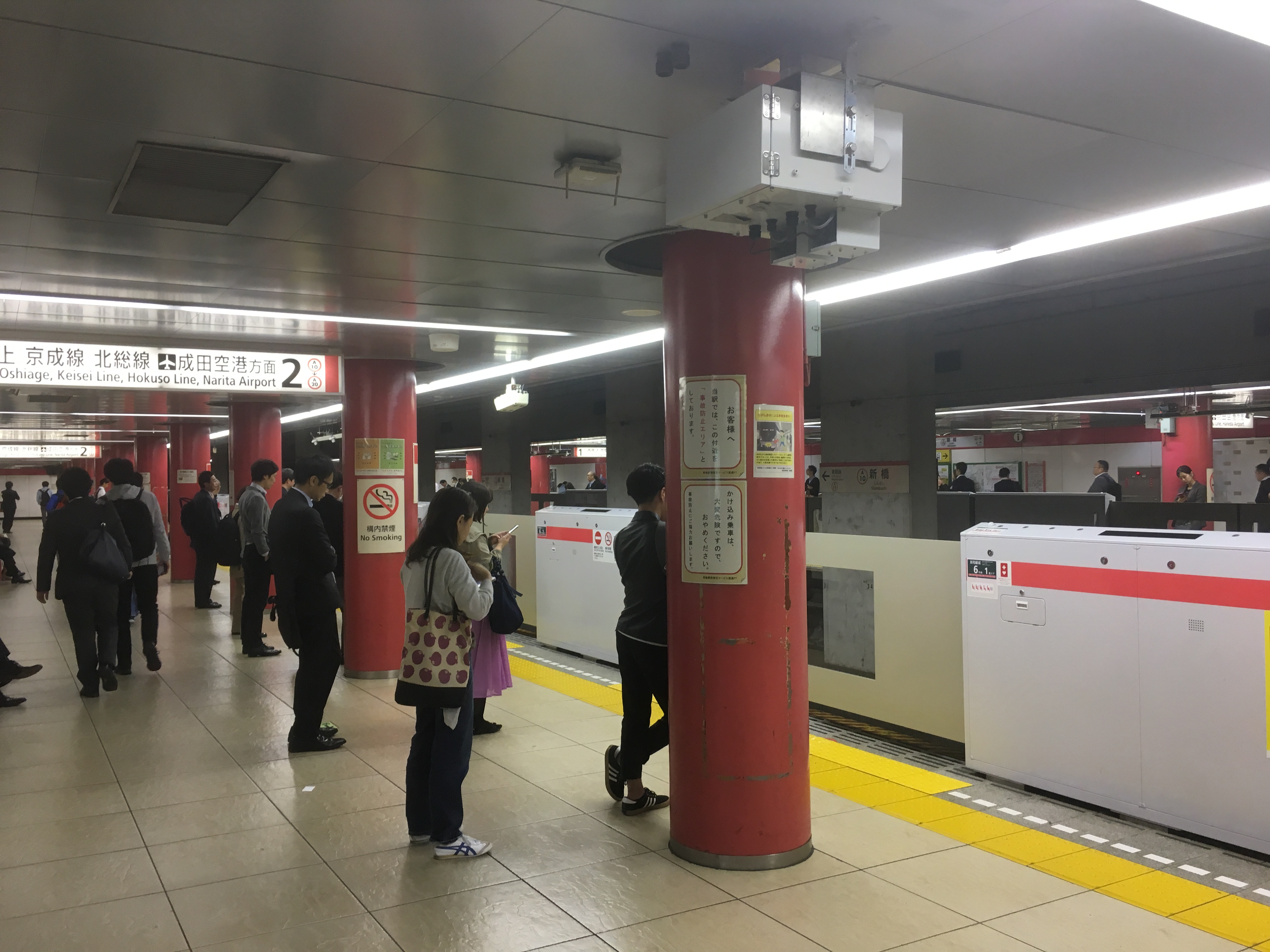
Platforms

=== Yurikamome ===
The terminus for the Yurikamome is an elevated station next to the JR station.

1/2	Yurikamome	for Daiba, Tokyo Big Sight, Shijō-mae, and Toyosu

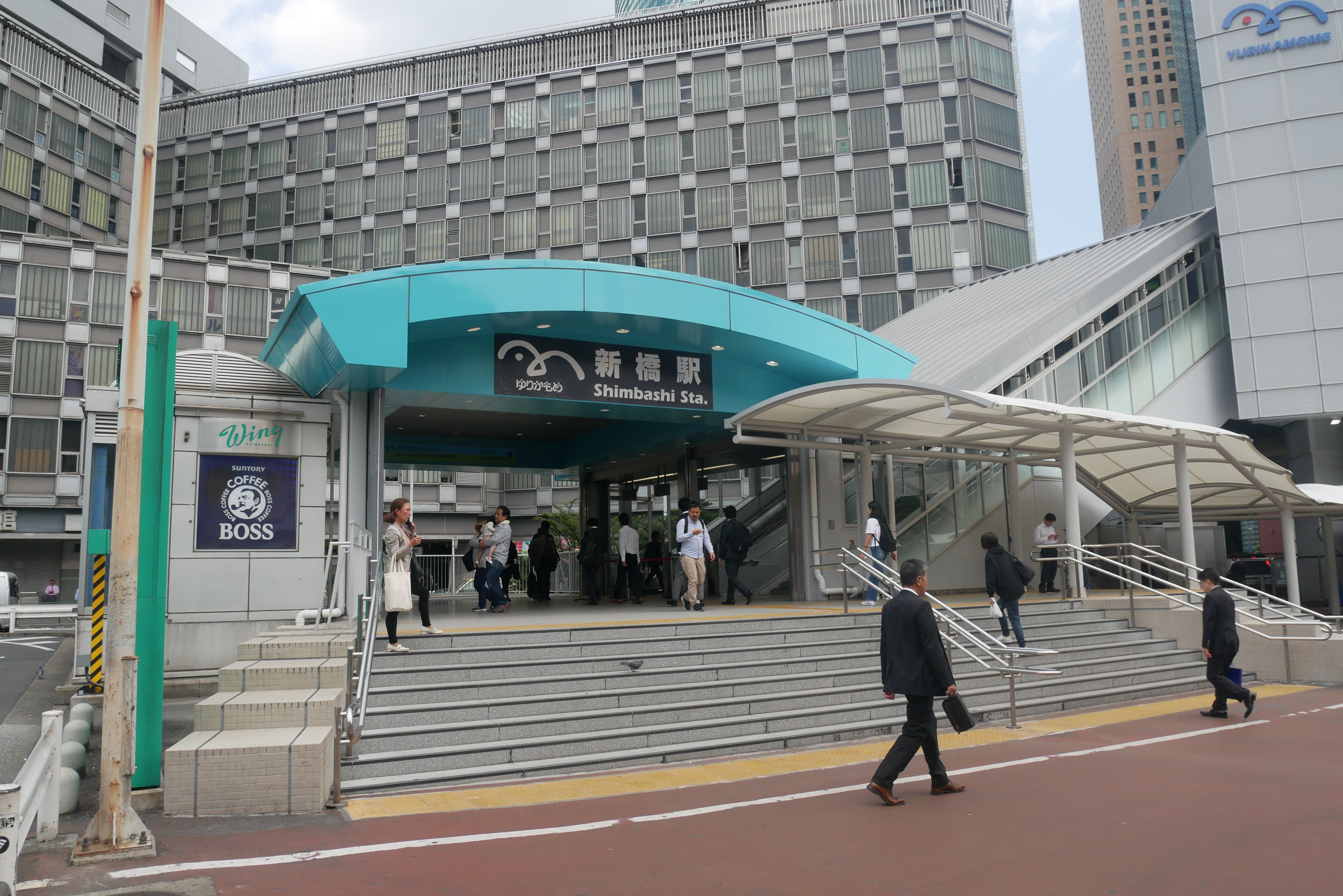
Yurikamome Shimbashi Station entrance, 2019

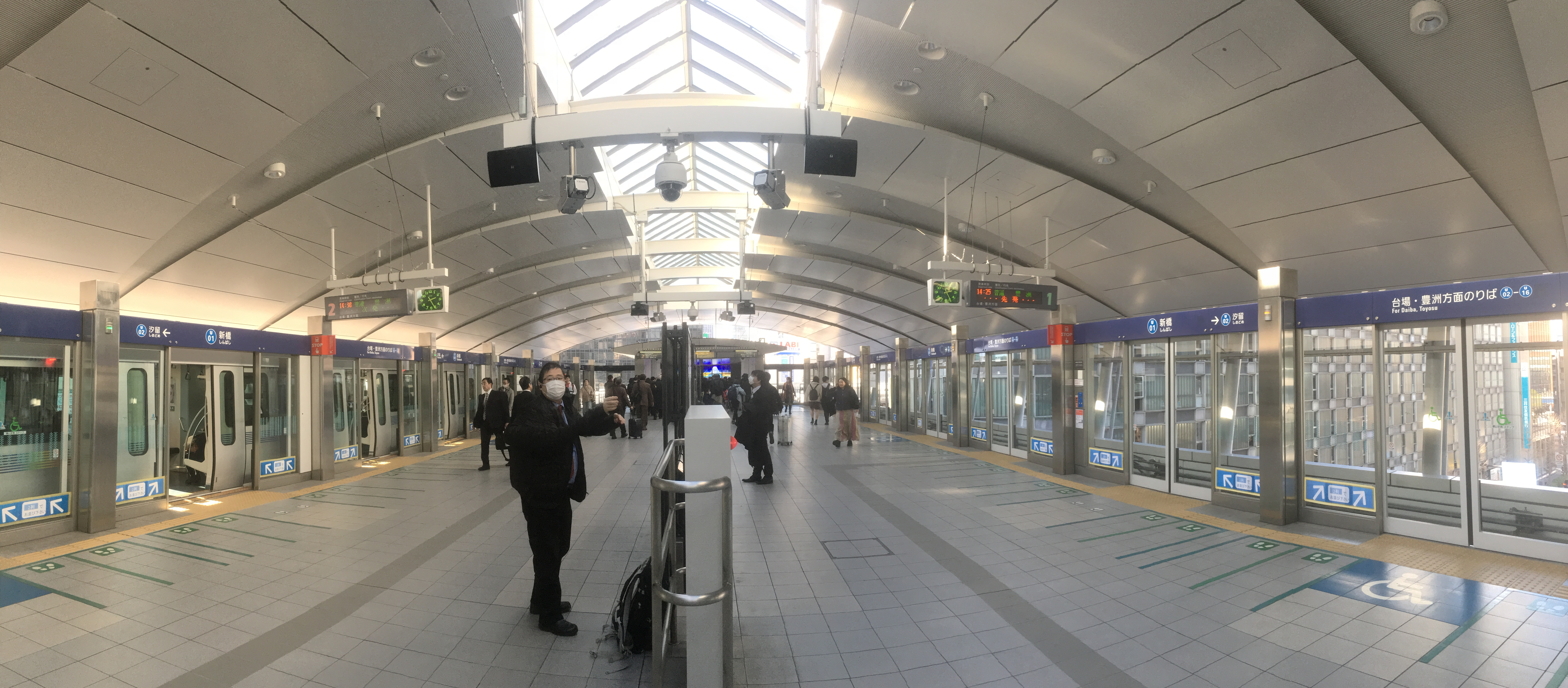
Platforms, January 2020

== History ==
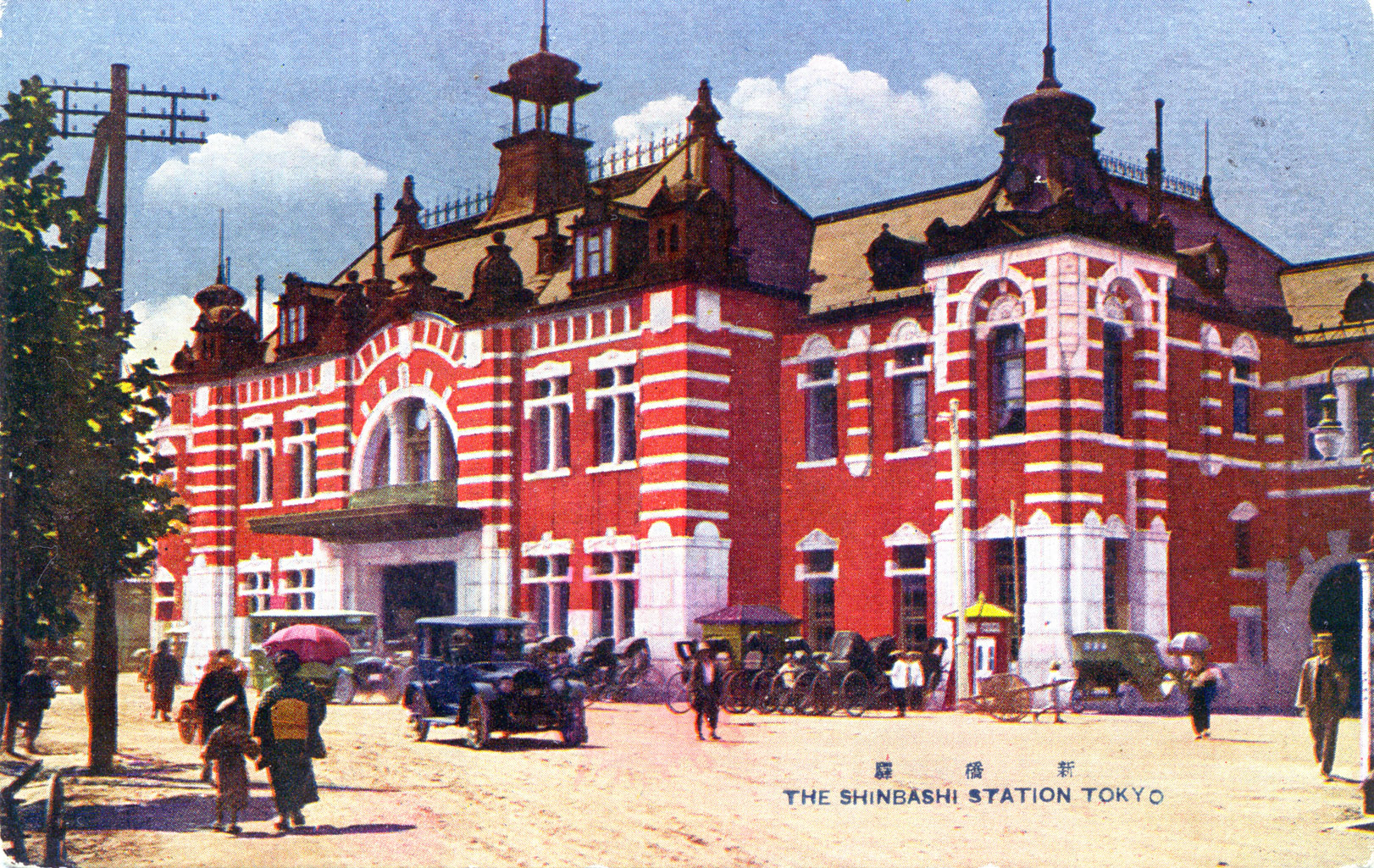
Shimbashi Station, early 20th century

Shimbashi is the original terminus of Japan's first stretch of railway, the Tōkaidō Main Line, and is one of Japan's oldest stations (the oldest station being Shinagawa, a few kilometres down the line). The original Shimbashi Station, opened on 10 October 1872, was built some way to the east of the modern-day structure and was known as Shimbashi Teishajō (新橋停車場).

The present-day structure opened on 16 December 1909, as Karasumori Station (烏森駅) on the Yamanote Line. With the extension of the Tōkaidō Main Line along its modern-day route to the new terminus at Tokyo Station in 1914, the original station was demolished to make way for a freight yard, Shiodome Station (汐留駅), and Karasumori Station was renamed Shimbashi Station.

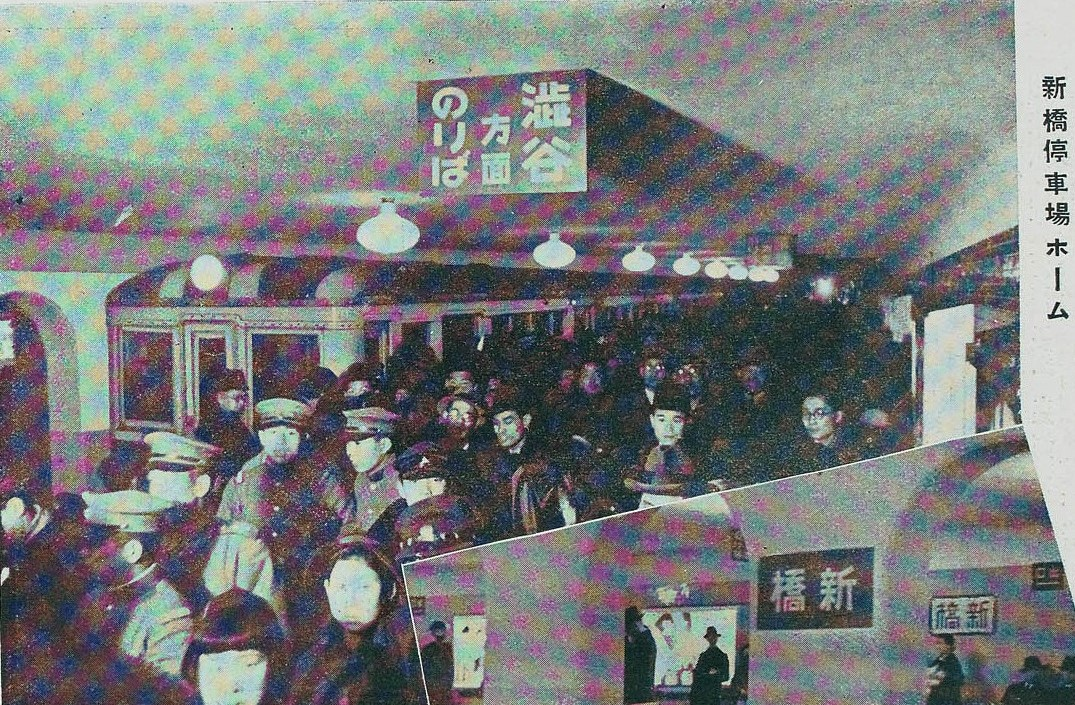
Subway platforms at Shimbashi Station in the 1930s.

Asia's first subway line, operated by the Tokyo Underground Railway, was extended to Shimbashi in 1934. In January 1939, the Tokyo Rapid Railway Company built a second subway station at Shimbashi for its line from Shibuya. After several months, the lines were merged to allow through service, and the TRR station was closed. In 1941 the two companies merged forming today's Tokyo Metro Ginza Line. The Ginza Line operated from a single platform until 1980, when a second parallel platform was opened to relieve congestion.

The Toei Asakusa Line began service to Shimbashi in 1968, and the elevated Yurikamome station opened in 1995.

Shiodome Station closed in 1986. The site was declared a national monument in 1996 and the area was archeologically investigated while being redeveloped as a commercial district ("Shiosite") with a number of large office blocks. In 2003 a reconstruction of the original Shimbashi Station building and part of the platforms was completed. It currently houses a railway history exhibit and a restaurant.

The station facilities of the Ginza Line were inherited by Tokyo Metro after the privatization of the Teito Rapid Transit Authority (TRTA) in 2004.

PASMO smart card coverage at this station began on 18 March 2007.

== Passenger statistics ==
In fiscal 2013, the JR East station was used by an average of 254,945 passengers daily (boarding passengers only), making it the seventh busiest station operated by JR East.

The JR East passenger figures for previous years are as shown below.

Fiscal year	Daily average
2000	230,393
2005	236,116
2010	244,916
2011	243,890
2012	250,682
2013	254,945

== See also ==
- List of railway stations in Japan
