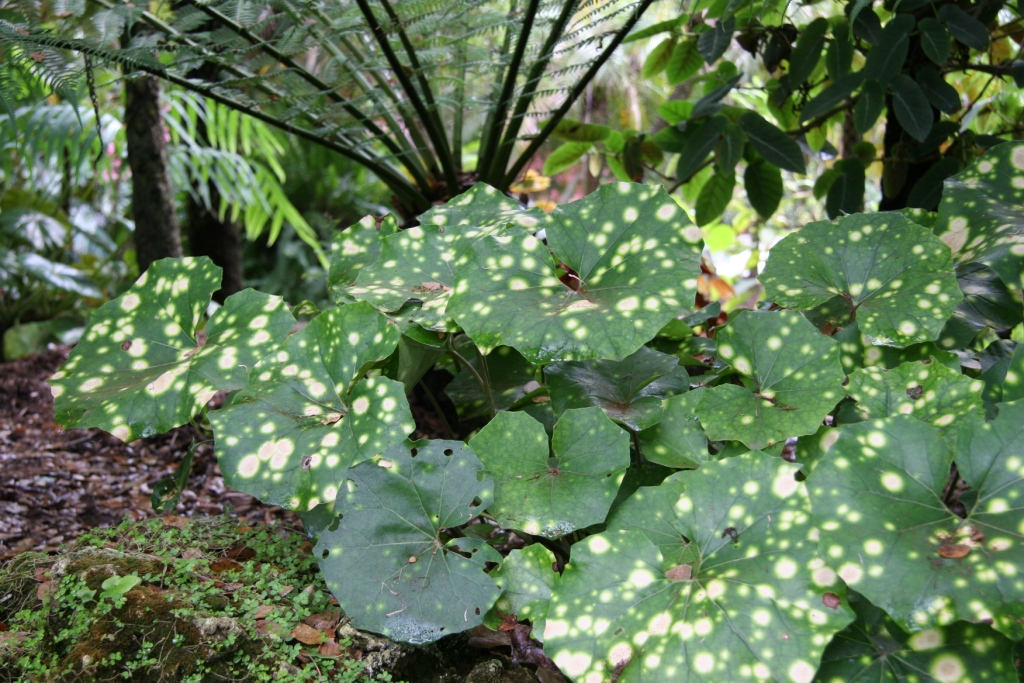

Scientific classification
- Kingdom: Plantae
- Clade: Tracheophytes
- Clade: Angiosperms
- Clade: Eudicots
- Clade: Asterids
- Order: Asterales
- Family: Asteraceae
- Genus: Farfugium
- Species: F. japonicum

Binomial name
- Farfugium japonicum (L.) Kitam.

Synonyms
- Tussilago japonica

= Farfugium japonicum =

Species of flowering plant

Farfugium japonicum (syn. Ligularia tussilaginea) is a species of flowering plant in the family Asteraceae, also known as leopard plant, green leopard plant or tractor seat plant. It is native to streams and seashores of Japan, where it is called tsuwabuki (石蕗).

== Description ==
It is a rhizomatous evergreen perennial, growing in a loose clump about 60 cm (24 in) tall and wide, with large round or kidney-shaped leaves that are slightly fleshy in texture. Daisy-like yellow flowers, 2.5–5 cm (1–2 in) across, are borne in loose clusters in autumn and winter.

== Cultivation ==
Farfugium japonicum is grown as an ornamental plant for garden planting and containers. The variegated cultivars are often used to brighten shade garden settings. Farfugium japonicum var. giganteum is a very large leaved selection. Some cultivars have shiny green leaves variegated with irregular creamy white or yellow markings, which are leathery and large, 4-10 in (10.2-25.4 cm) across, with wavy or toothed margins, held aloft on long stalks. Others are an even green without the white or yellow markings.

The cultivar 'Aureomaculatum' has gained the Royal Horticultural Society's Award of Garden Merit. It is hardy in coastal or mild areas, but requires protection from cold winds.

== Toxicity ==
Farfugium japonicum contains tumorigenic pyrrolizidine alkaloids.

== Gallery ==
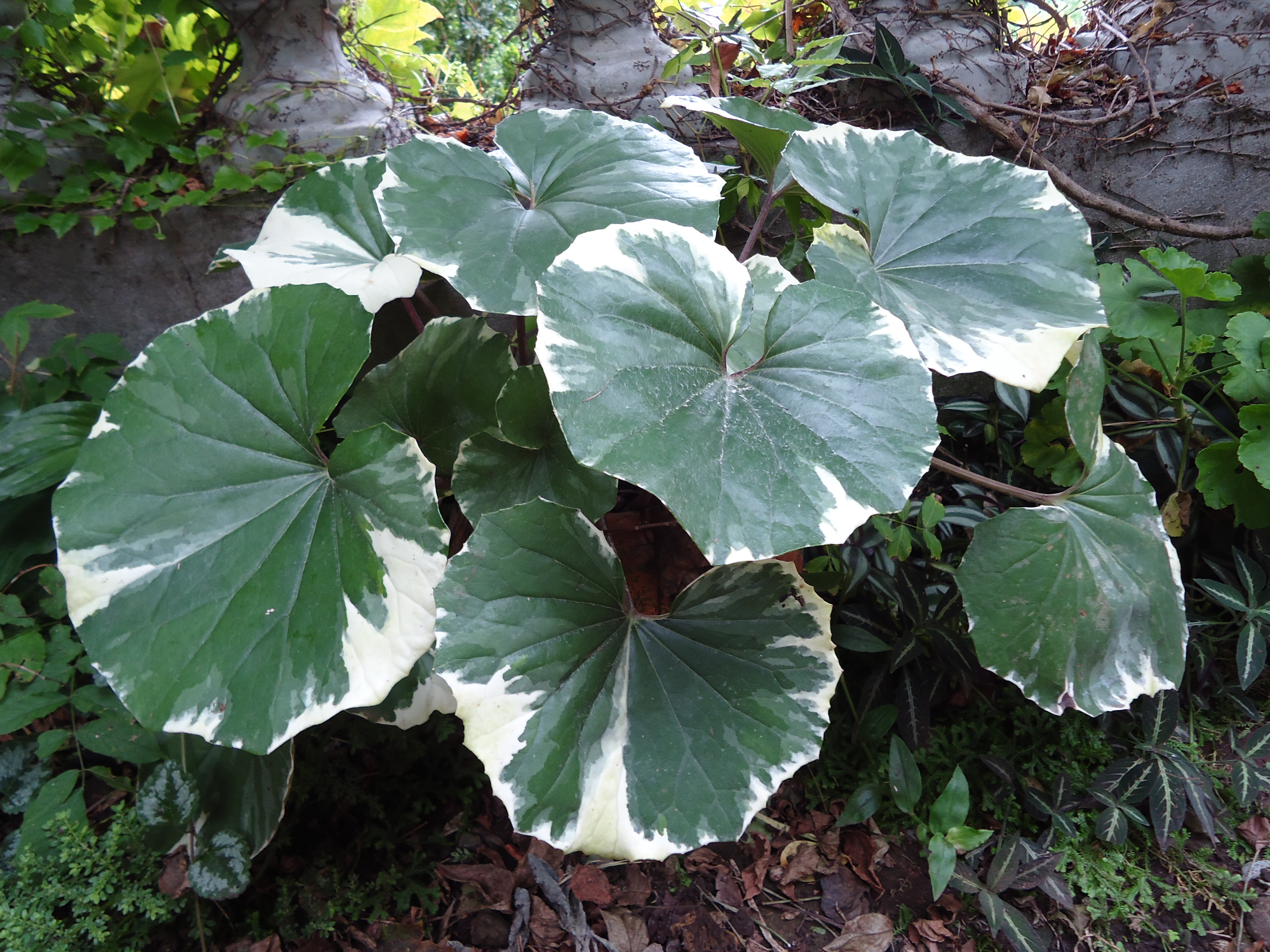
cv. 'Argenteum'

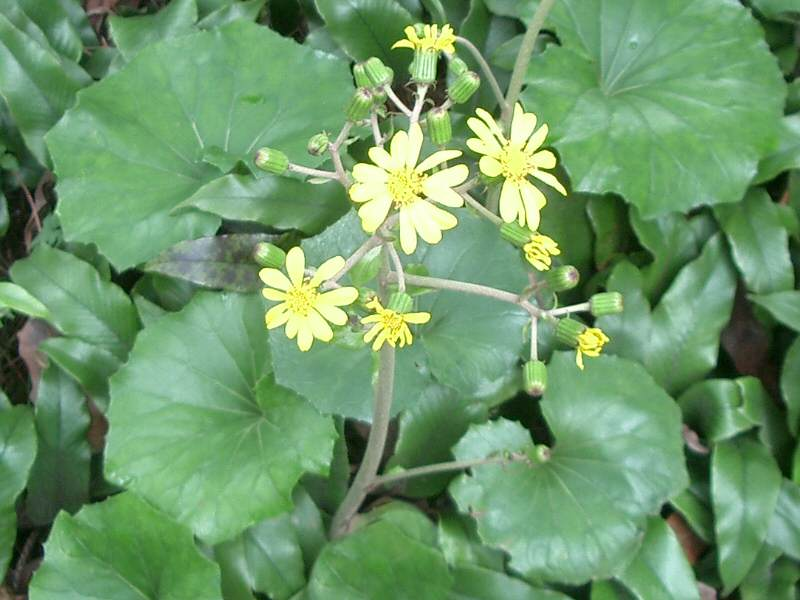
Flowers
