= Daimon Station (Tokyo) =

Metro station in Tokyo, Japan

Coordinates: 35°39′24″N 139°45′17″E

Daimon Station 大門駅

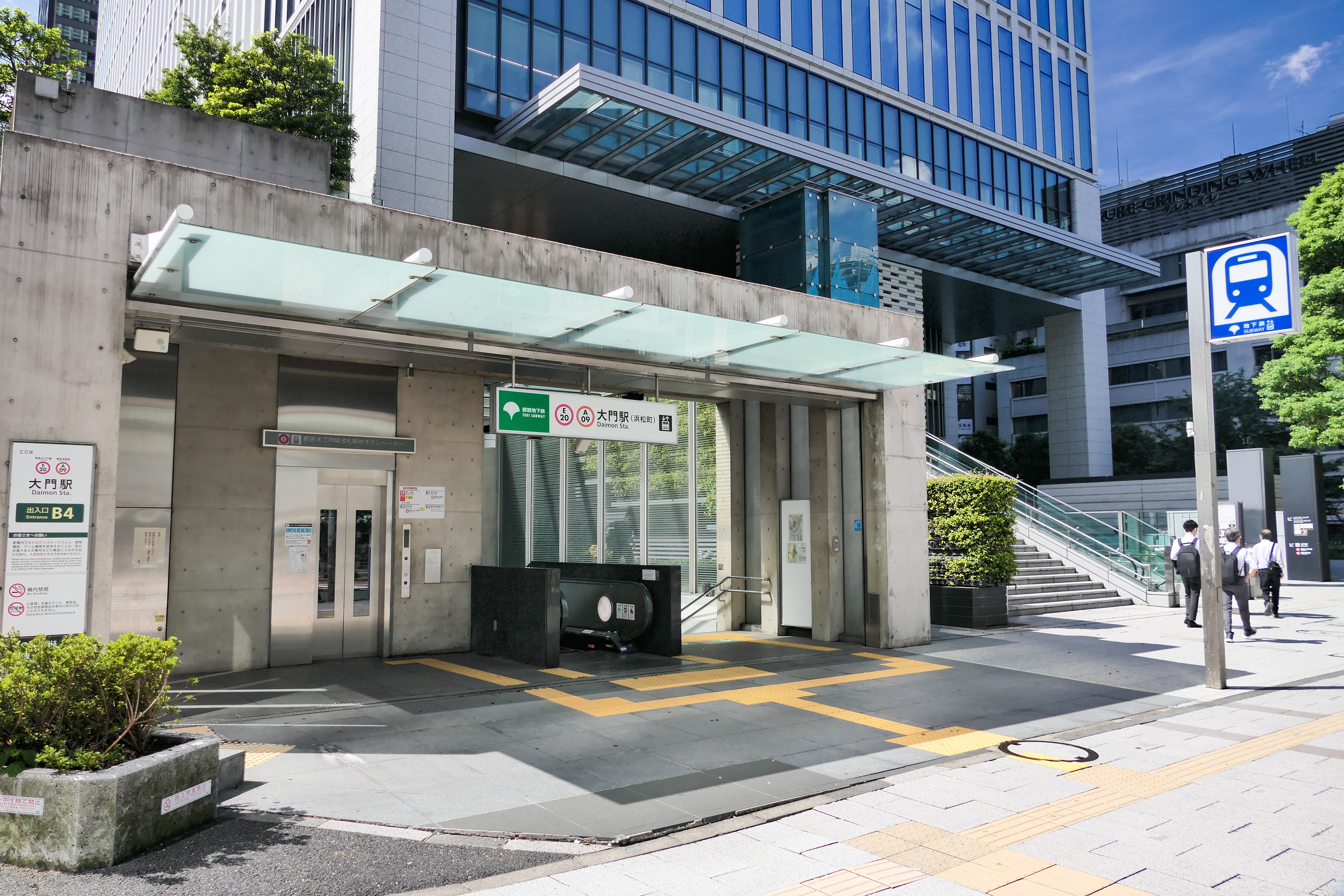
- B4 exit, 2024

General information
- Location: 1-27-12 (Asakusa Line); 2-3-4 (Oedo Line); Hamamatsuchō District, Minato City, Tokyo; Japan
- Operator: Toei Subway
- Lines: Asakusa Line; Ōedo Line
- Platforms: 2 side platforms (Asakusa Line); 1 island platform (Ōedo Line)
- Tracks: 4 (2 for each line)
- Connections: JK23 JY28 MO01 Hamamatsuchō

Construction
- Structure type: Underground

Other information
- Station code: A-09; E-20

History
- Opened: 1 October 1964; 61 years ago

Services
Preceding station	Toei Subway	Following station
Mita towards Sengakuji	Asakusa Line Airport Limited Express	Shimbashi towards Oshiage
Mita towards Nishi-magome	Asakusa Line	Shimbashi towards Oshiage
Akabanebashi towards Hikarigaoka	Ōedo Line	Shiodome towards Tochōmae
Location
- Location within Tokyo Yamanote Loop Location within Tokyo wards area Location within Japan

Daimon Station (大門駅, Daimon-eki) is a subway station in Minato, Tokyo, Japan, operated by the Tokyo subway operator Toei Subway. The station is named after the Shiba Daimon or Great Gate of Shiba, located just west of the station on the road leading to the temple of Zōjō-ji.

Daimon is adjacent to Hamamatsuchō Station, which is served by JR East and the Tokyo Monorail. On the Toei lines, Daimon is called "Daimon Hamamatsucho" in certain automated announcements. The Oedo Line station, which occupies most of the space between the Asakusa Line and the JR lines, was initially planned to be called "Hamamatsucho", but ultimately adopted the name of the existing Asakusa Line station.

== Lines ==
- Toei Asakusa Line (Station A-09)
- Toei Ōedo Line (Station E-20)

== Station layout ==
The Asakusa Line station has two side platforms. The Oedo Line station has one island platform.

=== Platforms ===
1	Asakusa Line	for Sengakuji and Nishi-magome; Keikyu Main Line for Shinagawa, Haneda Airport (International Terminal and Domestic Terminal) and Misakiguchi
2	Asakusa Line	for Nihombashi and Oshiage; Keisei Main Line for Keisei-Takasago, Keisei-Tsudanuma and Narita Airport (Terminal 2·3 and Terminal 1); Hokuso Line for Imba Nihon-idai; Narita Sky Access Line for Narita Airport; Shibayama Railway Line for Shibayama-Chiyoda
3	Ōedo Line	for Ryogoku and Iidabashi
4	Ōedo Line	for Roppongi, Tochomae, and Hikarigaoka

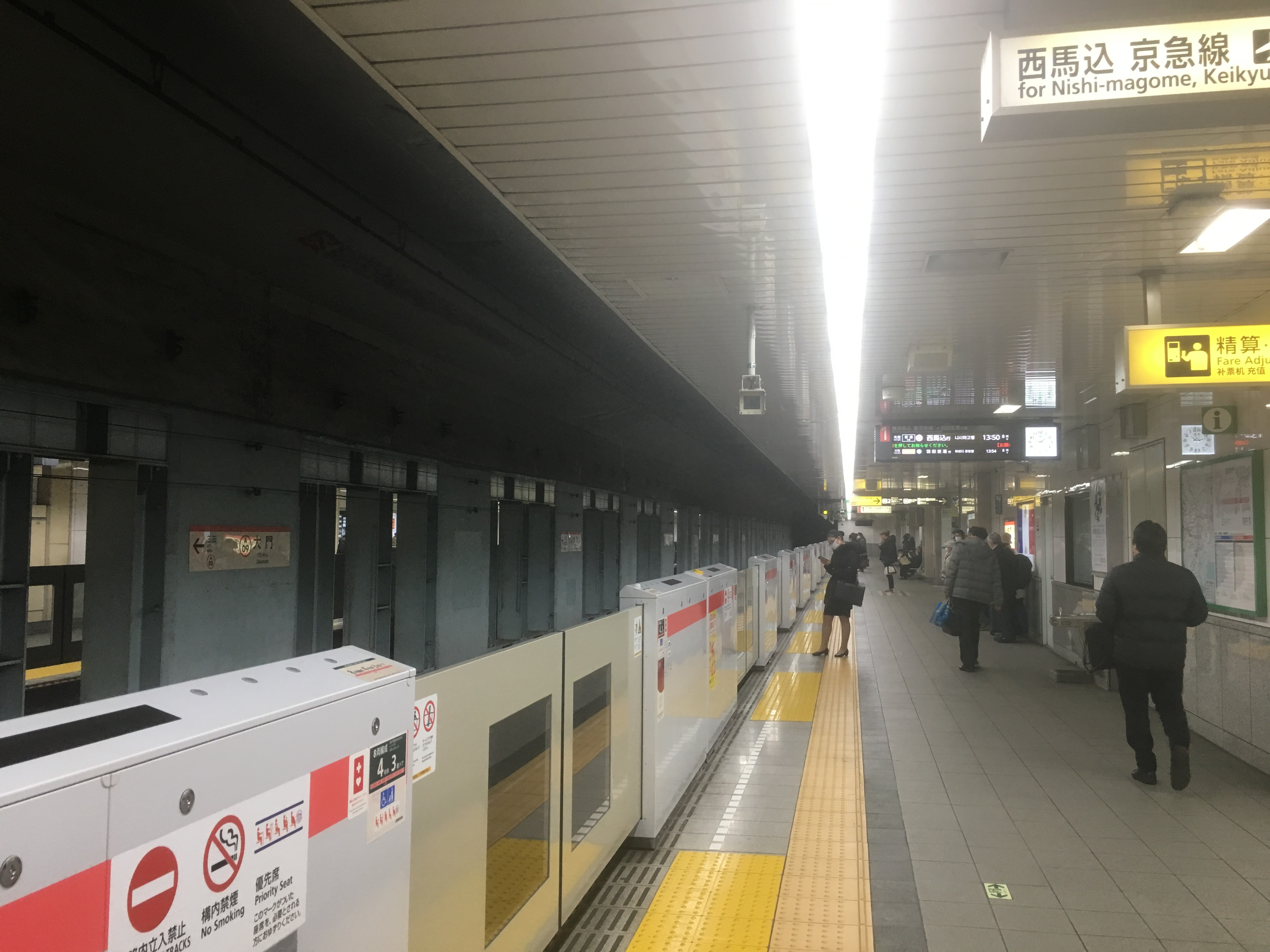
Asakusa Line platform, 2020

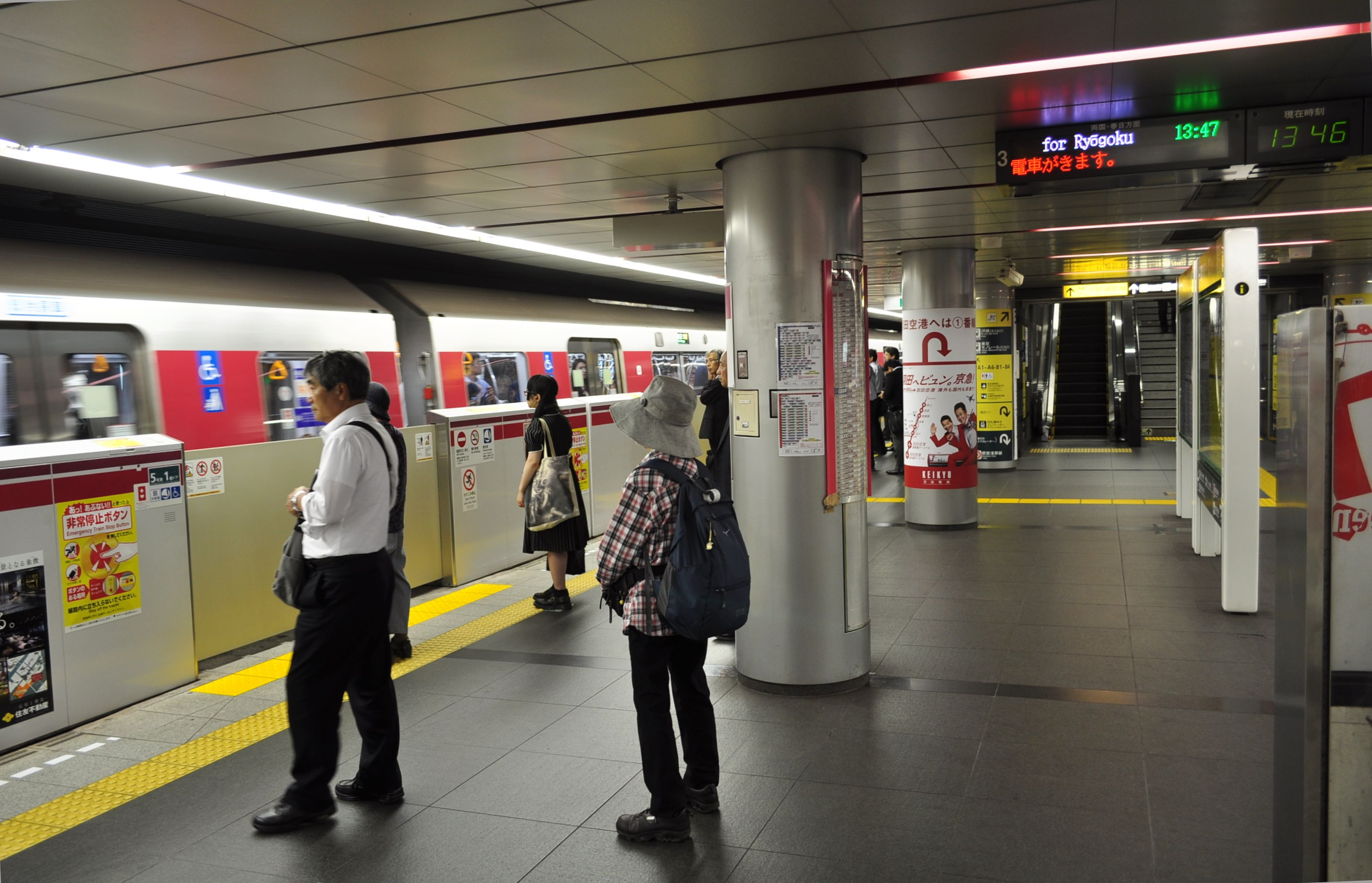
Oedo Line platforms, May 2018

== History ==
The station was opened on 1 October 1964 as a station on the Toei Subway Line No. 1, which would later become the Asakusa Line. On 12 December 2000, service on the Oedo Line began.

== Passenger statistics ==
In 2012, the Asakusa Line station was used by an average of around 91,000 arriving and departing passengers per day, while the Oedo Line station was used by an average of around 114,000.
