= Mutsuura Station =

Railway station in Yokohama, Japan

KK51 Mutsuura Station 六浦駅
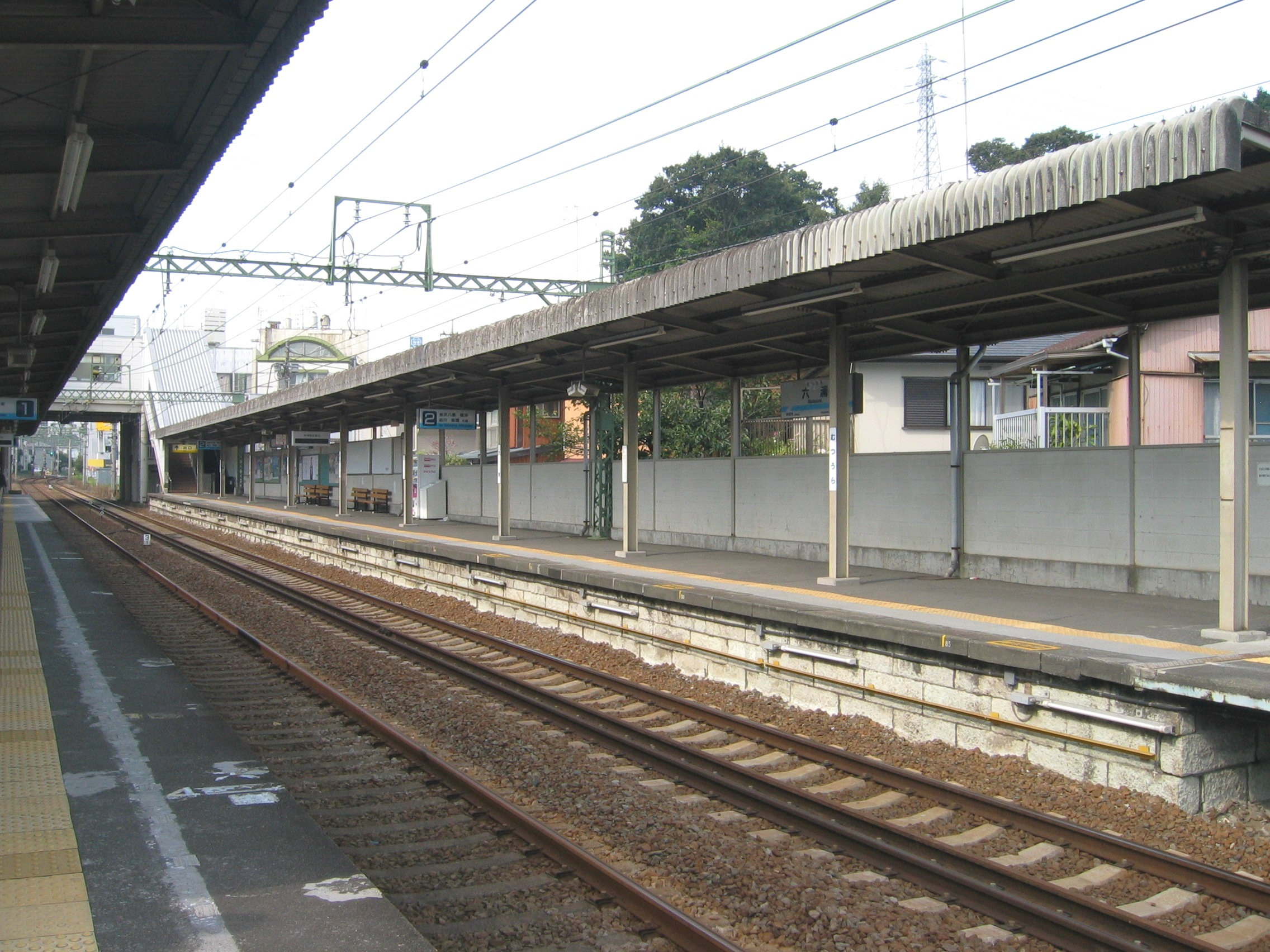
- Platforms of Mutsuura Station

General information
- Location: 5 Mutsuura, Kanazawa-ku, Yokohama-shi, Kanagawa-ken 236-0031; Japan
- Coordinates: 35.3228°N 139.6113°E
- Operator: Keikyū
- Line: Keikyū Zushi Line
- Distance: 1.3 km from Kanazawa-hakkei
- Platforms: 2 side platforms
- Connections: Bus stop

Other information
- Station code: KK51
- Website: Official website

History
- Opened: February 15, 1943

Passengers
- 2019: 15,934 daily

Services
Preceding station	Keikyu	Following station
Jimmuji KK52 towards Zushi·Hayama	Zushi Line Limited Express (Tokkyū) Express Local	Kanazawa-hakkei KK50 Terminus
Location
- Location within Kanagawa Prefecture Location within Japan

Mutsuura Station (六浦駅, Mutsuura-eki) is a passenger railway station located in Kanazawa-ku, Yokohama, Kanagawa Prefecture, Japan, operated by the private railway company Keikyū.

== Lines ==
Mutsuura Station is served by the Keikyū Zushi Line and is located 1.3 kilometers from the terminus of the line at Kanazawa-hakkei Station, and 42.2 km from Shinagawa in Tokyo.

== Station layout ==
The station consists of two opposed side platforms connected by a footbridge. One track is dual gauge, to allow moving narrow-gauge rolling stock from the J-TREC factory at Kanazawa-hakkei to the JR Yokosuka Line at Zushi.

=== Platforms ===
1	Keikyū Zushi Line	for Zushi·Hayama
2	Keikyū Zushi Line	for Kanazawa-hakkei, Yokohama, Shinagawa, and Haneda Airport (Terminal 3 and Terminal 1·2)

== History ==
Mutsuura Station opened on February 15, 1943 as a station on the Tokyu Shōnan Line, the predecessor to Keikyū. Initially, the station was intended to service the nearby Ikego Munitions Depot, and its use was restricted to personnel of the Imperial Japanese Navy. The station was also located 500 meters closer to Zushi·Hayama than its present position. In 1948, the Keihin Electric Railway spun out from the Tokyu Corporation, and the station was relocated to its present address on March 1, 1949. A new station building was completed in 1970.

Keikyū introduced station numbering to its stations on 21 October 2010; Mutsuura Station was assigned station number KK51.

== Passenger statistics ==
In fiscal 2019, the station was used by an average of 15,934 passengers daily.

The passenger figures for previous years are as shown below.

Fiscal year	daily average
2005	18,271
2010	16,523
2015	16,235

== Surrounding area ==
The station is located in a residential neighborhood.

== See also ==
- List of railway stations in Japan
