= 2020 Super Formula Lights =

Auto racing championship in Japan

The 2020 Super Formula Lights Championship was the first Super Formula Lights Championship season, after the Japanese Formula 3 Championship was rebranded following the end of the 2019 season. It was rebranded because of FIA nomenclature regulations (all regional F3 series were rebranded "Formula Regional," with the European series in 2019 and North American series in 2020; the Formula Regional branding went to another promoter) and a switch to Euroformula Open Championship specification Dallara 320 chassis and similar regulations, which are different from FIA-approved Formula Regional.

== Teams and drivers ==
Team	Engine	No.	Driver	Status	Rounds
Toda Racing	Toda TR-F301	2	(Japan) Teppei Natori		All
ALBIREX Racing Team	Tomei TB14F3 2020	3	(Japan) Seiya Jin		1–2
ALBIREX Racing Team	Tomei TB14F3 2020	3	(Republic of Ireland) Lucca Allen		4–6
ALBIREX Racing Team	Tomei TB14F3 2020	5	(Japan) Tsubasa Iriyama		All
Rn-sports	Siegfried Spiess A41	10	(Japan) Masayuki Ueda	M	All
B-Max Engineering	Siegfried Spiess A41	13	(Japan) Motoyoshi Yoshida	M	1–3
B-Max Engineering	Siegfried Spiess A41	13	(Japan) Mizuki Ishizaka		4
B-Max Engineering	Siegfried Spiess A41	13	(Japan) Yoshiaki Katayama		5
B-Max Engineering	Siegfried Spiess A41	13	(Japan) Satoshi Motoyama		6
B-Max Engineering	Siegfried Spiess A41	30	(Japan) "Dragon"	M	All
B-Max Racing Team	Siegfried Spiess A41	50	(Japan) Sena Sakaguchi		All
B-Max Racing Team	Siegfried Spiess A41	51	(Japan) Kiyoto Fujinami		1
B-Max Racing Team	Siegfried Spiess A41	51	(Japan) Yoshiaki Katayama		2
B-Max Racing Team	Siegfried Spiess A41	51	(Japan) Nobuhiro Imada	M	3–6
B-Max Racing Team	Siegfried Spiess A41	52	(Japan) Mitsunori Takaboshi		1
B-Max Racing Team	Siegfried Spiess A41	52	(Japan) Masami Kageyama		2
B-Max Racing Team	Siegfried Spiess A41	52	(Japan) Takashi Hata	M	3, 5
B-Max Racing Team	Siegfried Spiess A41	52	(Japan) Sakon Yamamoto		6
RS Fine	TOM'S TAZ31	35	(Japan) Shunsuke Kohno		All
Corolla Chukyo Kuo Team TOM'S	TOM'S TAZ31	36	(Japan) Ritomo Miyata		All
Corolla Chukyo Kuo Team TOM'S	TOM'S TAZ31	37	(Japan) Kazuto Kotaka		All

Icon	Class
M	Masters' Cup.

== Race calendar ==
The race calendar for the 2020 season was revealed on September 11, 2019. All rounds supported the Super Formula Championship. After multiple postponements due to the COVID-19 pandemic, a revised calendar was announced on 10 June 2020, which had the season start at the end of August and finish in late December.

Round		Circuit	Date	Pole position	Fastest lap	Winning driver	Winning team	Masters winner
1	R1	Twin Ring Motegi	29 August	(Japan) Ritomo Miyata	(Japan) Ritomo Miyata	(Japan) Ritomo Miyata	Corolla Chukyo Kuo Team TOM'S	(Japan) "Dragon"
1	R2	Twin Ring Motegi	30 August	(Japan) Ritomo Miyata	(Japan) Ritomo Miyata	(Japan) Ritomo Miyata	Corolla Chukyo Kuo Team TOM'S	(Japan) Motoyoshi Yoshida
1	R3	Twin Ring Motegi	30 August		(Japan) Ritomo Miyata	(Japan) Ritomo Miyata	Corolla Chukyo Kuo Team TOM'S	(Japan) "Dragon"
2	R4	Okayama International Circuit	26 September	(Japan) Ritomo Miyata	(Japan) Ritomo Miyata	(Japan) Ritomo Miyata	Corolla Chukyo Kuo Team TOM'S	(Japan) Masayuki Ueda
2	R5	Okayama International Circuit	27 September	(Japan) Ritomo Miyata	(Japan) Ritomo Miyata	(Japan) Sena Sakaguchi	B-Max Racing Team	(Japan) "Dragon"
3	R6	Sportsland SUGO	17 October	(Japan) Sena Sakaguchi	(Japan) Ritomo Miyata	(Japan) Ritomo Miyata	Corolla Chukyo Kuo Team TOM'S	(Japan) "Dragon"
3	R7	Sportsland SUGO	18 October	(Japan) Sena Sakaguchi	(Japan) Sena Sakaguchi	(Japan) Sena Sakaguchi	B-Max Racing Team	(Japan) "Dragon"
3	R8	Sportsland SUGO	18 October		(Japan) Ritomo Miyata	(Japan) Ritomo Miyata	Corolla Chukyo Kuo Team TOM'S	(Japan) "Dragon"
4	R9	Autopolis	14 November	(Japan) Ritomo Miyata	(Japan) Ritomo Miyata	(Japan) Ritomo Miyata	Corolla Chukyo Kuo Team TOM'S	(Japan) "Dragon"
4	R10	Autopolis	15 November	(Japan) Teppei Natori	(Japan) Sena Sakaguchi	(Japan) Sena Sakaguchi	B-Max Racing Team	(Japan) "Dragon"
4	R11	Autopolis	15 November		(Japan) Ritomo Miyata	(Japan) Ritomo Miyata	Corolla Chukyo Kuo Team TOM'S	(Japan) "Dragon"
5	R12	Suzuka Circuit	5 December	(Japan) Sena Sakaguchi	(Japan) Ritomo Miyata	(Japan) Ritomo Miyata	Corolla Chukyo Kuo Team TOM'S	(Japan) "Dragon"
5	R13	Suzuka Circuit	6 December	(Japan) Sena Sakaguchi	(Japan) Ritomo Miyata	(Japan) Sena Sakaguchi	B-Max Racing Team	(Japan) "Dragon"
5	R14	Suzuka Circuit	6 December		(Japan) Ritomo Miyata	(Japan) Ritomo Miyata	Corolla Chukyo Kuo Team TOM'S	(Japan) "Dragon"
6	R15	Fuji Speedway	19 December	(Japan) Ritomo Miyata	(Japan) Ritomo Miyata	(Japan) Ritomo Miyata	Corolla Chukyo Kuo Team TOM'S	(Japan) "Dragon"
6	R16	Fuji Speedway	20 December	(Japan) Sena Sakaguchi	(Japan) Ritomo Miyata	(Japan) Kazuto Kotaka	Corolla Chukyo Kuo Team TOM'S	(Japan) Nobuhiro Imada
6	R17	Fuji Speedway	20 December		(Japan) Ritomo Miyata	(Japan) Ritomo Miyata	Corolla Chukyo Kuo Team TOM'S	(Japan) "Dragon"

== Championship standings ==
- Each driver's final point totals were based on their 14 best results. The points were awarded as follows:

1	2	3	4	5	6	PP	FL
10	7	5	3	2	1	1	1

=== Drivers' Championships ===
==== Overall ====
Pos	Driver	MOT			OKA		SUG			AUT			SUZ			FUJ			Points
Pos	Driver	R1	R2	R3	R1	R2	R1	R2	R3	R1	R2	R3	R1	R2	R3	R1	R2	R3	Points
1	(Japan) Ritomo Miyata	1	1	1	1	2	1	2	1	1	3	1	1	Ret	1	1	3	1	153
2	(Japan) Sena Sakaguchi	2	3	2	2	1	2	1	2	2	1	2	8	1	2	2	2	2	116
3	(Japan) Kazuto Kotaka	4	2	3	7	3	3	5	3	Ret	4	4	3	2	3	3	1	3	73
4	(Japan) Teppei Natori	3	7	5	4	4	Ret	3	5	3	2	3	5	3	5	4	4	4	54
5	(Japan) Shunsuke Kohno	7	5	7	6	Ret	4	4	4	4	5	5	2	4	4	5	5	5	38
6	(Japan) Yoshiaki Katayama				3	Ret							4	5	7				10
7	(Japan) Mitsunori Takaboshi	5	4	4															8
8	(Japan) Tsubasa Iriyama	9	9	9	Ret	5	6	6	6	7	7	7	7	6	Ret	8	6	6	8
9	(Republic of Ireland) Lucca Allen									6	6	Ret	6	Ret	6	6	7	8	5
10	(Japan) Seiya Jin	6	8	8	5	Ret													3
11	(Japan) Mizuki Ishizaka									5	DNS	6							3
12	(Japan) "Dragon"	10	Ret	10	10	7	5	7	7	8	8	8	9	7	8	9	11	9	2
13	(Japan) Kiyoto Fujinami	8	6	6															2
14	(Japan) Masami Kageyama				8	6													1
15	(Japan) Masayuki Ueda	11	Ret	11	9	8	7	8	8	Ret	9	9	11	8	9	11	10	Ret	0
16	(Japan) Sakon Yamamoto															12	8	7	0
17	(Japan) Satoshi Motoyama															7	Ret	Ret	0
18	(Japan) Nobuhiro Imada						8	9	9	WD	WD	WD	10	Ret	10	10	9	10	0
19	(Japan) Motoyoshi Yoshida	12	10	12	11	9	10	11	11										0
20	(Japan) Takashi Hata						9	10	10				Ret	Ret	11				0
Pos	Driver	R1	R2	R3	R1	R2	R1	R2	R3	R1	R2	R3	R1	R2	R3	R1	R2	R3	Points
Pos	Driver	MOT			OKA		SUG			AUT			SUZ			FUJ			Points

==== Masters Class ====
Pos	Driver	MOT			OKA		SUG			AUT			SUZ			FUJ			Points
Pos	Driver	R1	R2	R3	R1	R2	R1	R2	R3	R1	R2	R3	R1	R2	R3	R1	R2	R3	Points
1	(Japan) "Dragon"	10	Ret	10	10	7	5	7	7	8	8	8	9	7	8	9	11	9	155
2	(Japan) Masayuki Ueda	11	Ret	11	9	8	7	8	8	Ret	9	9	11	8	9	11	10	Ret	102
3	(Japan) Nobuhiro Imada						8	9	9	WD	WD	WD	10	Ret	10	10	9	10	55
4	(Japan) Motoyoshi Yoshida	12	10	12	11	9	10	11	11										36
5	(Japan) Takashi Hata						9	10	10				Ret	Ret	11				12
Pos	Driver	R1	R2	R3	R1	R2	R1	R2	R3	R1	R2	R3	R1	R2	R3	R1	R2	R3	Points
Pos	Driver	MOT			OKA		SUG			AUT			SUZ			FUJ			Points

=== Teams' standings ===
Pos	Team	Points
1	Corolla Chukyo Kuo Team TOM'S	137
2	B-Max Racing Team	110
3	Toda Racing	53
4	RS Fine	38
5	ALBIREX Racing Team	16
6	B-Max Engineering	10
7	Rn-sports	0

=== Engine manufacturer standings ===
Pos	Team	Points
1	TOM'S	137
2	Siegfried Spiess Motorenbau	110
3	Toda Racing	53
4	Tomei Engine	16
