= Shonan Beach FM =

Japanese radio station

Coordinates: 35°18′11.5″N 139°35′28.6″E

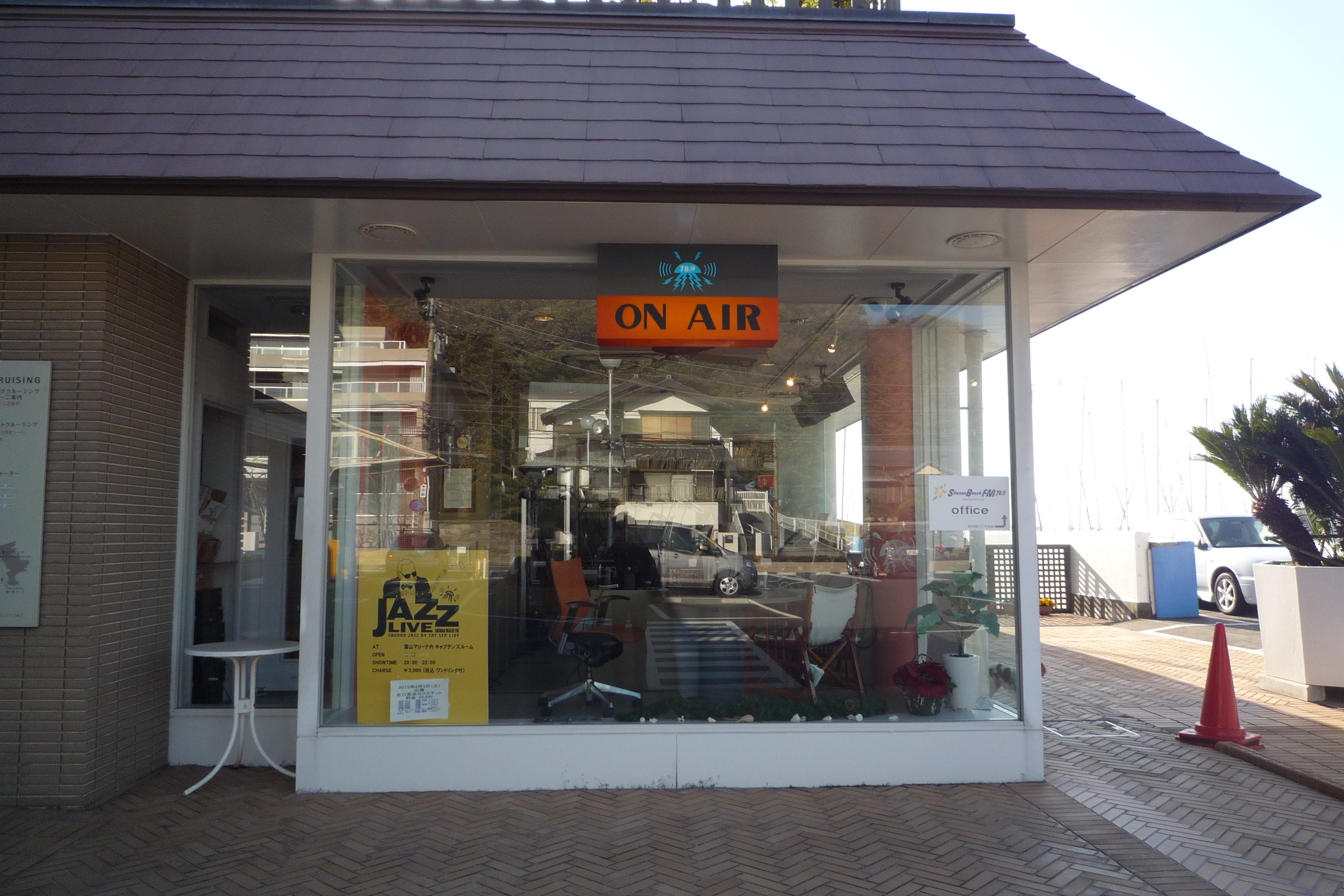
Former home of Shonan Beach FM

Shonan Beach FM is a low-power FM and internet radio station based in Zushi in Kanagawa Prefecture, Japan. Operated by Zushi Hayama Community Broadcasting Company, it broadcasts mainly jazz, but also features R&B and Big Band, as well as a certain amount of city pop, Hawaiian and classical music. The station sponsors a monthly "Jazz By The Sea" concert at Riviera Zushi Marina.

Transmitting on a frequency of 78.9 MHz, Shonan Beach FM was established with an initial power of 0.25 watts on 3 December 1993. Internet simulcasting started in November 1996, changing to a 24 hour simulcast starting in October 2004. In 2000 the station increased FM transmission power to 20 watts. Ten years after its launch, it had gathered a listenership of around 200,000 in Japan alone and many more via the internet, over which its output is streamed - one of its devoted listeners being star Mika, who reportedly loves the channel, as he mentioned in an interview on french radio RTL.

Although the station's (minimal) spoken output is in Japanese, its website does include some information in English.
