= Zushi =

Zushi 逗子市
- City
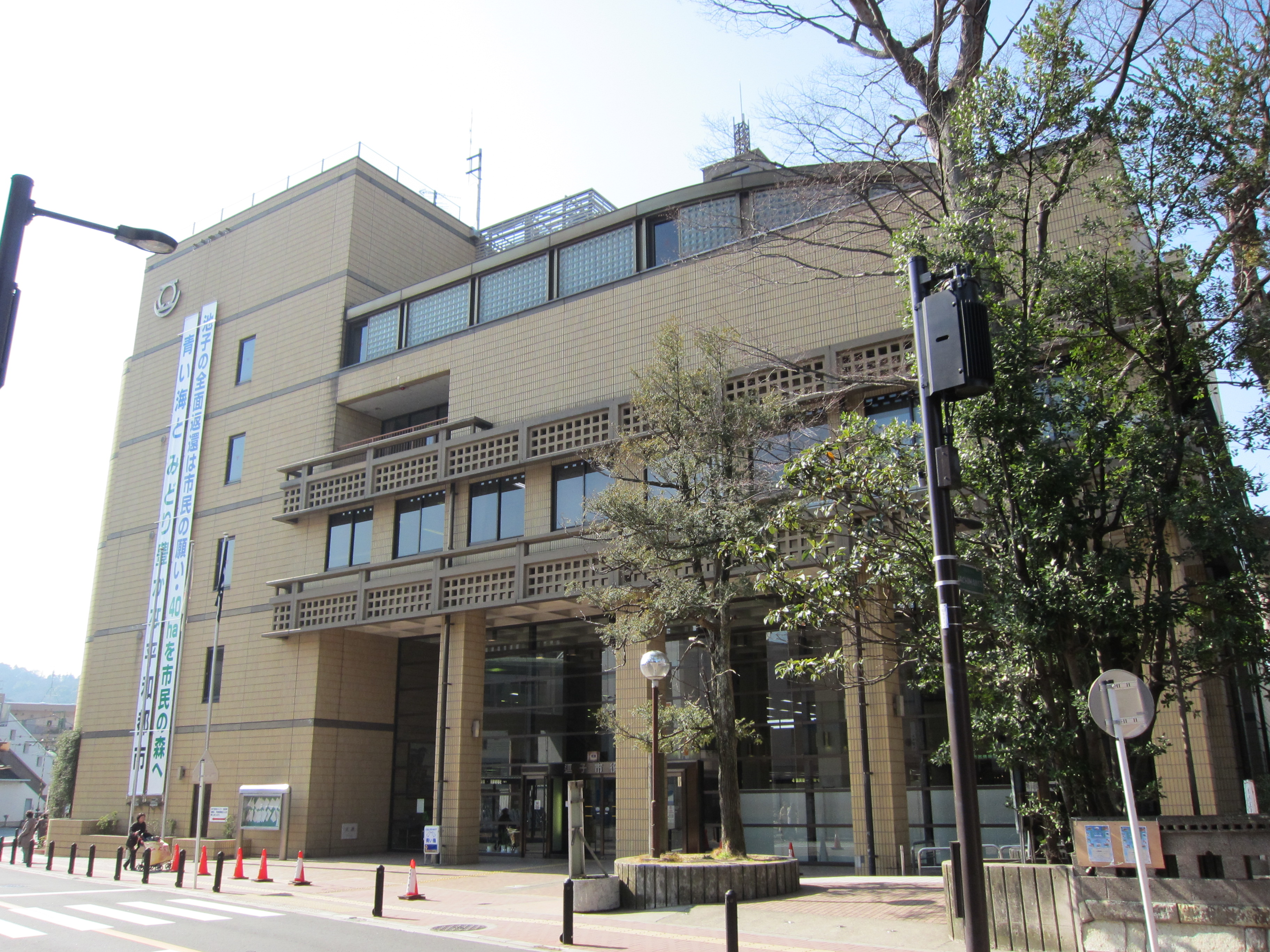
- Zushi City Hall

- Flag Seal

- Location of Zushi in Kanagawa Prefecture

- Coordinates: 35°17′N 139°35′E
- Country: Japan
- Region: Kantō
- Prefecture: Kanagawa Prefecture

Government
  - Mayor: Satoru Kirigaya

Area
  - Total: 17.34 km^{2} (6.70 sq mi)

Population (June 1, 2012)
  - Total: 58,087
  - Density: 3,350/km^{2} (8,700/sq mi)
- Time zone: UTC+9 (Japan Standard Time)
  - Tree: Camellia
  - Flower: Tricyrtis hirta
- Address: 5-2-16 Zushi, Zushi-shi, Kanagawa-ken 249-8686
- Website: http://www.city.zushi.kanagawa.jp/

Zushi (逗子市, Zushi-shi; Japanese pronunciation: [dzɯꜜ.ɕi, dzɯ.ɕi̥ꜜ.ɕi]) is a city located in Kanagawa Prefecture, Japan.

As of June 2012, the city has an estimated population of 58,087, and a population density of 3,350 per km². The total area is 17.34 km^{2} (6.70 sq mi).

== Geography ==
Zushi is located at the head of Miura Peninsula, facing Sagami Bay on the Pacific Ocean. The city is built on an alluvial plain formed by the Tagoe River (田越川) and surrounded by low, steep hills.

=== Surrounding municipalities ===
- Hayama
- Kamakura
- Kanazawa-ku, Yokohama
- Yokosuka

== Demographics ==
Per Japanese census data, the population of Zushi has remained relatively steady since 1980.

Historical population
Year	Pop.	±%
1920	9,152	—
1930	15,308	+67.3%
1940	23,953	+56.5%
1950	35,908	+49.9%
1960	39,572	+10.2%
1970	48,242	+21.9%
1980	58,479	+21.2%
1990	56,704	−3.0%
2000	57,281	+1.0%
2010	58,302	+1.8%
2020	57,060	−2.1%

== History ==
The area of Zushi has been inhabited since prehistoric times, and numerous Kofun period and Yayoi period remains have been discovered. During the Heian period, it came under the control of the Miura clan, and during the Kamakura period formed part of the outer fortifications for Kamakura. The port of Kotsubo is mentioned frequently in the Azuma Kagami. The name 'Zushi' has been written in many different ways, including 豆師・図師・厨子・豆子. The term "zushi" itself means a street, an alley or an intersection and came to the Kantō region from Kyoto. One of its first appearances is in a Hōjō clan document as 豆師. During the Edo period, along with most of eastern Sagami Province, the area was tenryō territory under direct control of the Tokugawa shogunate, and administered by various hatamoto.

In the April 1, 1889, cadastral reform after the Meiji Restoration, Tagoe Village within Miura District Kanagawa Prefecture was created through the merger of six local hamlets. Development of the area was encouraged by the opening of the Yokosuka Line railway on June 16, 1889. Tagoe Village changed its name to Zushi Village on April 1, 1924; however, on April 1, 1943 it was annexed by Yokusuka city. Zushi regained its status as an independent municipality on July 1, 1950, as Zushi Town. City status was gained on April 15, 1954. Zushi developed as a resort area in the 1960s, with the opening of Zushi Marina in 1967. In the mid-1990s, the city was the center of a political controversy involving the creation of a housing area for the United States Navy at Ikego, the site of a former Imperial Japanese Navy ammunition depot, to support the expansion of nearby Yokosuka Naval Base. When the citizens of Zushi first learned of these plans in the 1980s, they organized a movement to save the Ikego Forest. Led by the women of the town, the movement sought preservation of Ikego as a park and wildlife sanctuary. A decade of opposition by the citizens of Zushi had been effective in slowing the development. The construction was definitely forced through in 1994, when the Zushi Municipal Government finally accepted 854 housing units after winning a promise from the central government to Zushi and Kanagawa Prefecture that it would not build any more facilities in the Ikego area. However, a plan contravening this agreement was introduced in July 2003. To prevent the building of 800 additional U.S. military housing units a citizen's group called the Association to Stop the US Residential Construction and to Protect Ikego Forest launched an opposition movement in 2004.

== Economy ==
Zushi is a beach resort, and has attracted writers (e.g. Roka Tokutomi), media personalities (e.g. Yujiro Ishihara and Mino Monta), musicians and politicians (e.g. Shintaro Ishihara) as either a residence or location for a second home. The city is largely a bedroom community for Tokyo and Yokohama. It is the home of Shonan Beach FM radio station (FM and internet radio).

== Transportation ==
=== Rail ===
- JR East – Yokosuka Line
  - Zushi ・ Higashi-Zushi
- Keikyū Zushi Line
  - Jimmuji ・ Zushi·Hayama

=== Highways ===
- National Route 134

== Local attractions ==
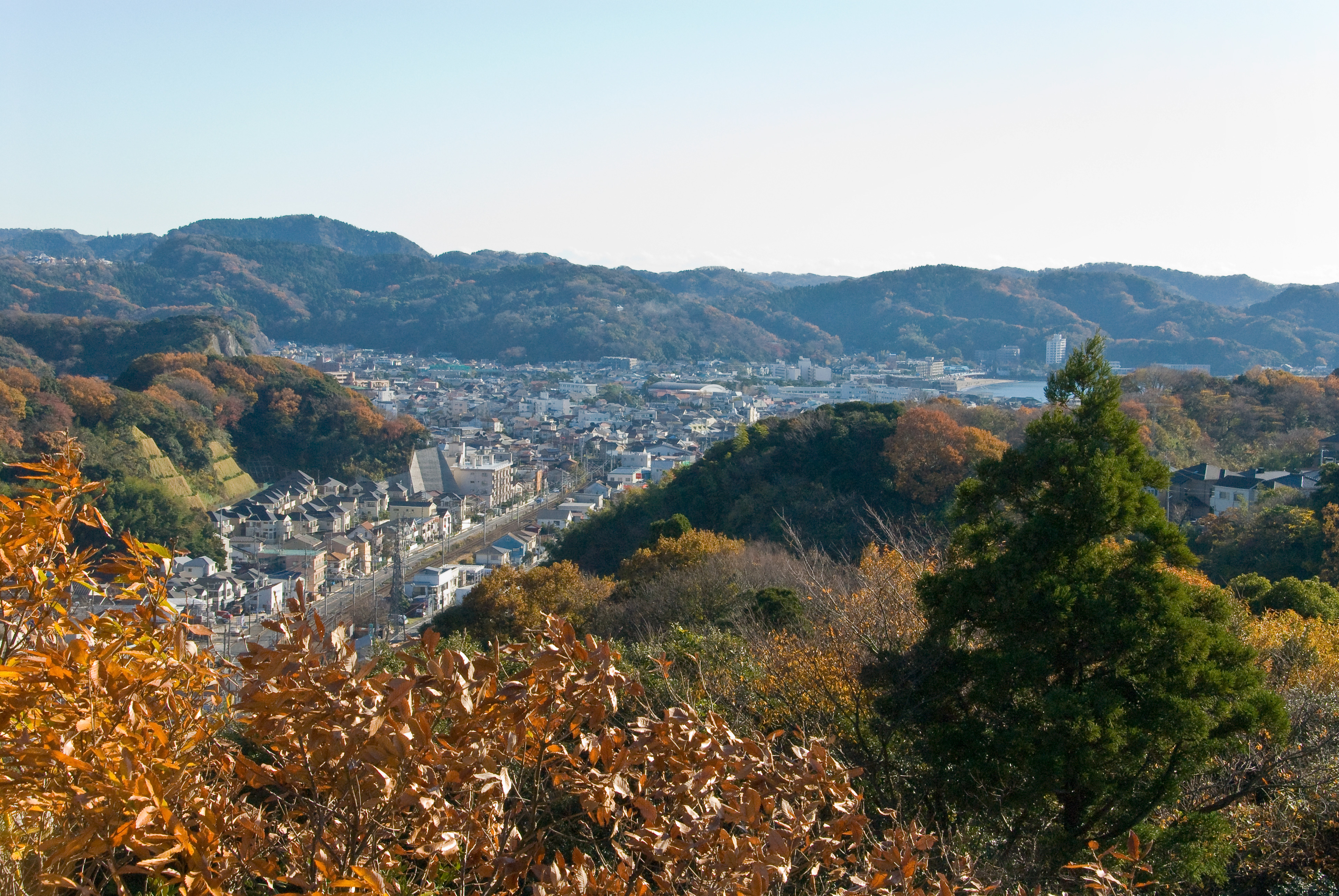
Zushi seen from Hosshō-ji. The Yokosuka Line and Sagami Bay can be seen.

- Ganden-ji, number two of the Bandō Sanjūsankasho
- Hosshō-ji, Nichiren-sect temple that is supposed to lie on the spot where Nichiren was rescued from a mob by three white monkeys.

== Sister cities ==
Zushi is twinned with:

- Ikaho, Gunma, Japan, since 1979
- Nazaré, Portugal, since 2004

== Education ==
Kanagawa Prefectural Board of Education operates area public high schools.

The DoDEA operates Ikego Elementary School in the Ikego Housing Area. People in the housing area are zoned to Yokosuka Middle School and Nile C. Kinnick High School, both at United States Fleet Activities Yokosuka.

== Notable people ==
The following are some notable residents of Zushi.

- Takeshi Aikoh – professional baseball player
- iri – singer
- Nobuteru Ishihara – politician
- Hirotaka Ishihara – politician
- Tamio Kawachi – actor
- Ritomo Miyata – racing driver
- Risako Sugaya – singer
- Mutsuo Takahashi – writer
- Rita Taketsuru – wife of Masataka Taketsuru, founder of Nikka Whisky
- Kaori Yoneyama – professional wrestler
