= Keikyū Zushi Line =

Railway line in Japan

Keikyu Zushi Line
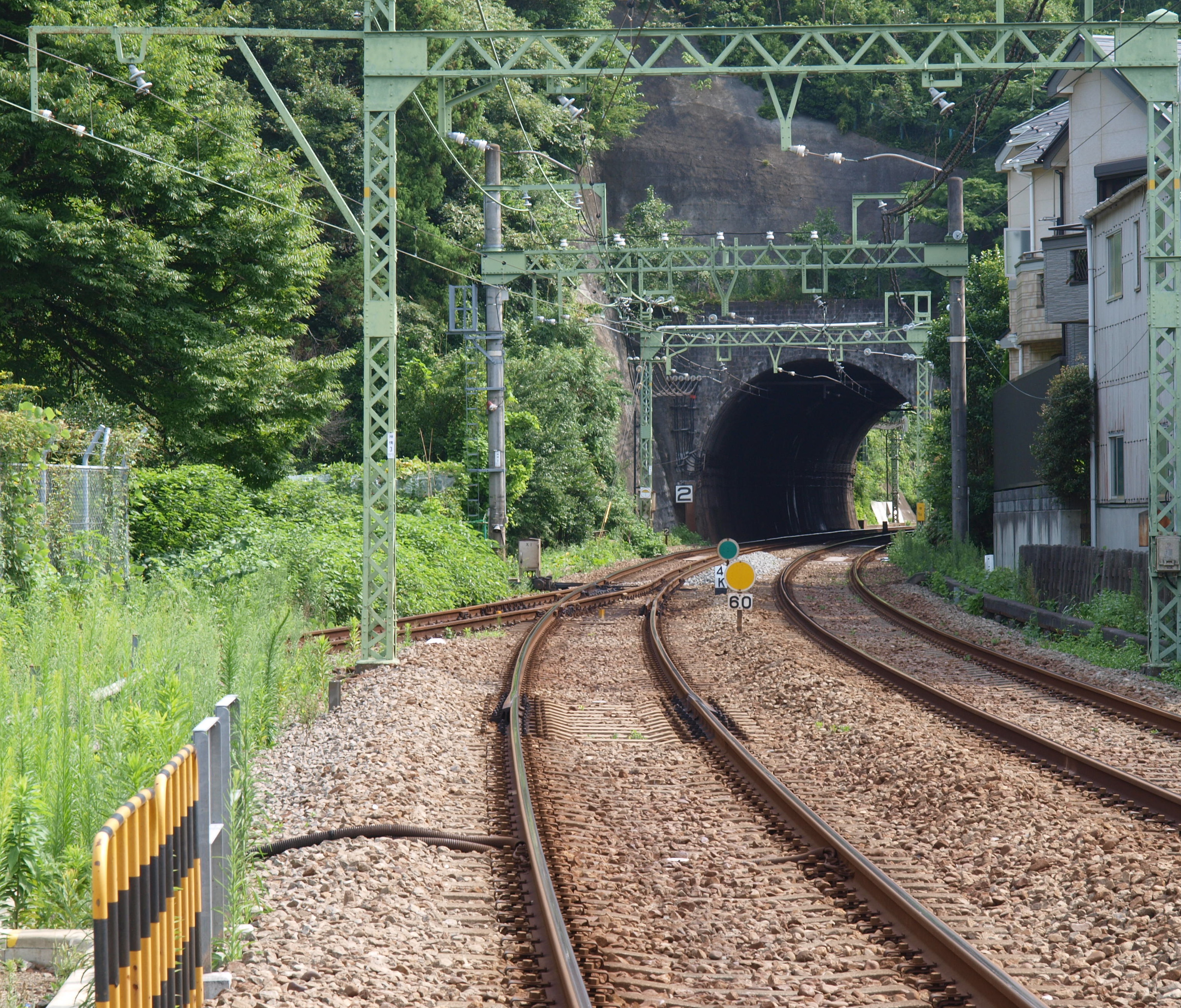
- The dual-gauge track near Jimmuji station that allows for narrow-gauge rolling stock to be transferred from the J-TREC factory to JR tracks near Zushi Station.

Overview
- Native name: 京急逗子線
- Owner: Keikyu
- Locale: Kanagawa Prefecture
- Termini: Kanazawa-hakkei; Zushi·Hayama
- Stations: 4

Service
- Type: Commuter rail
- Depot: None

History
- Opened: April 1, 1930; 96 years ago

Technical
- Line length: 5.9 km (3.7 mi)
- Number of tracks: 2
- Track gauge: 1,435 mm (4 ft 8 1/2 in)
- Electrification: 1,500 V DC, overhead catenary
- Operating speed: 100 km/h (60 mph)

The Keikyu Zushi Line (Japanese: 京急逗子線, Hepburn: Keikyū Zushi-sen) is a 5.9-kilometre (3.7 mi) private railway line in Japan, operated by Keikyū. It connects Kanazawa-hakkei in Kanazawa-ku, Yokohama with Zushi·Hayama in Zushi, all in Kanagawa Prefecture.

== Service outline ==
Three service types operate on the Keikyu Zushi Line, as shown below.

Abbreviations

- Lo – Local: (Note: 普通, Futsū) Stops at all stations. In the early morning/late night, local trains shuttle between Kanazawa-hakkei and Zushi·Hayama. At all other times, local trains run through to/from the Keikyu Main Line.
- Exp – Express: (Note: 急行, Kyūkō) Services run to/from Haneda Airport Terminal 1·2 via the Main Line and Airport Line.
- TLE – Tokkyū Limited Express Services northbound operate via the Main Line to Sengakuji. Services southbound start from Kanazawa-bunko.

== Station list ==
Local trains stop at all stations.

No.	Name	Distance in km (mi)	Express	Tokkyū Ltd. Exp.	Transfers	Location
KK50	Kanazawa-hakkei 金沢八景	0 (0)	●	●	Main Line (through service); Kanazawa Seaside Line (14)	Kanazawa-ku, Yokohama
KK51	Mutsuura 六浦	1.3 (0.81)	●	●		Kanazawa-ku, Yokohama
KK52	Jimmuji 神武寺	4.1 (2.5)	●	●		Zushi
KK53	Zushi·Hayama 逗子・葉山	5.9 (3.7)	●	●	Yokosuka Line (Zushi: JO06); Shōnan–Shinjuku Line (Zushi: JS06)	Zushi

== History ==
The line was opened in April 1930 by the Shonan Electric Railway (湘南電気鉄道). Jimmuji Station opened on 1 April 1931.

Station numbering was introduced from 21 October 2010.

== See also ==
- List of railway lines in Japan
