= Jimmuji Station =

Railway station in Zushi, Kanagawa Prefecture, Japan

KK52 Jimmuji Station 神武寺駅
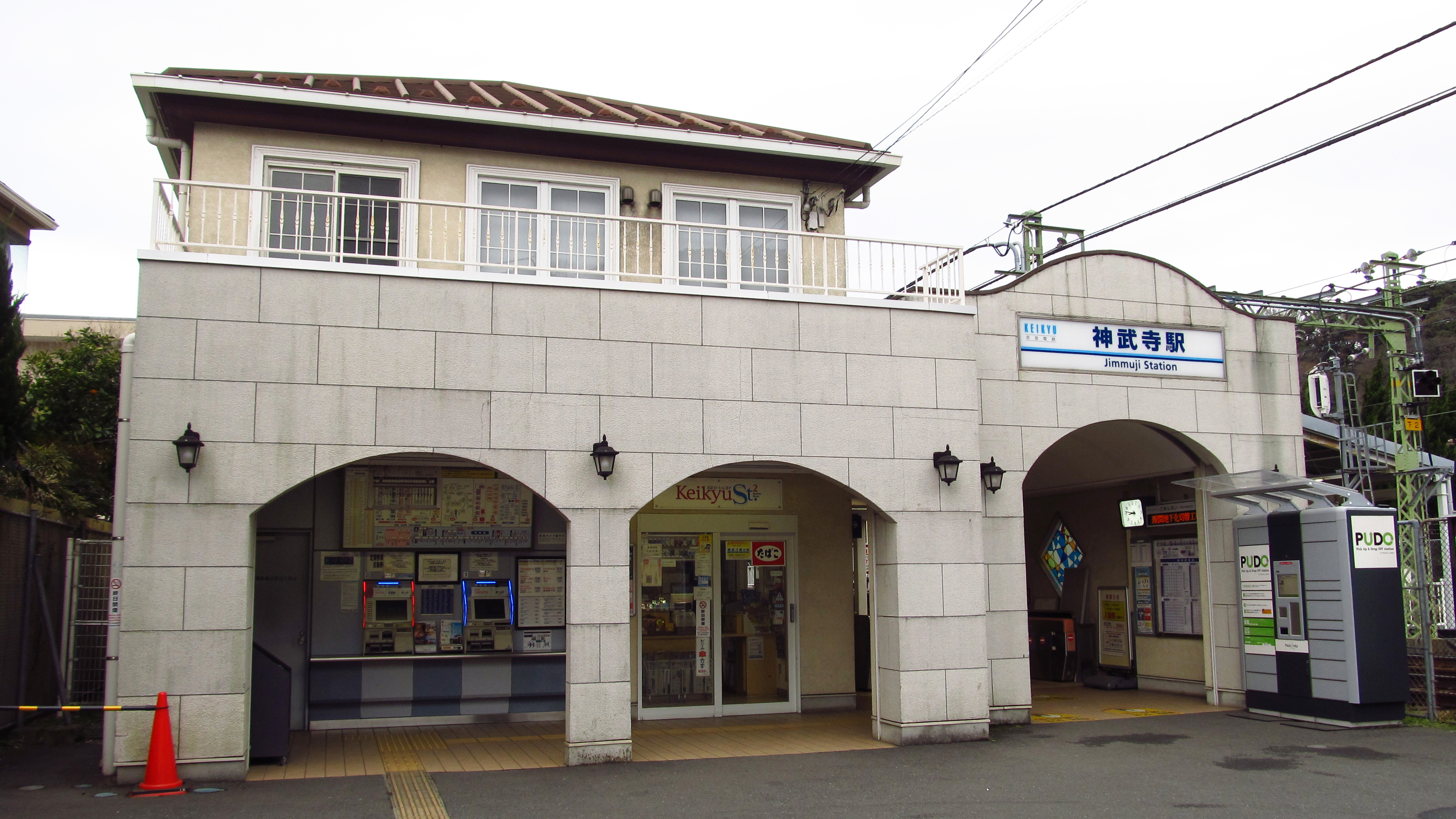
- Jimmuji Station building in February 2019

General information
- Location: 2-11-2 Ikego, Zushi-shi, Kanagawa-ken; Japan
- Coordinates: 35°18′22.19″N 139°35′34.23″E
- Operator: Keikyu
- Line: Keikyu Zushi Line
- Platforms: 2 side platforms
- Tracks: 2

Other information
- Station code: KK52
- Website: Official website

History
- Opened: 1 April 1931

Passengers
- FY2008: 6,240 daily

Services
| Preceding station | Keikyu | Following station |
|---|---|---|
| Zushi·Hayama KK53 Terminus | Zushi Line Limited Express (Tokkyū) Express Local | Mutsuura KK51 towards Kanazawa-hakkei |
Location
- Location within Kanagawa Prefecture Location within Japan

Jimmuji Station (神武寺駅, Jinmuji-eki) is a railway station on the Keikyu Zushi Line in Zushi, Kanagawa, Japan, operated by the private railway operator Keikyu.

== Lines ==
Jimmuji Station is served by the Keikyu Zushi Line branch line from Kanazawa-hakkei to Zushi·Hayama. It is located 4.1 km from the junction at Kanazawa-hakkei Station, and 45.0 km from the starting point of the line at Shinagawa Station.

== Station layout ==
Jimmuji Station has two side platforms serving two tracks. The platforms are connected by a level crossing for passenger use. A dedicated entrance and exit is provided on the north side of the station for US Navy personnel, which links directly to the adjoining Ikego housing complex.

On the north side of the station are narrow gauge (1,067 mm (3 ft 6 in)) storage tracks used for transferring rolling stock from J-TREC's Yokohama factory to JR East's tracks at Zushi Station.

=== Platforms ===
| 1 | Keikyu Zushi Line | for Zushi·Hayama |
| 2 | Keikyu Zushi Line | for Yokohama, Shinagawa, and Haneda Airport (Terminal 3 and Terminal 1·2) |

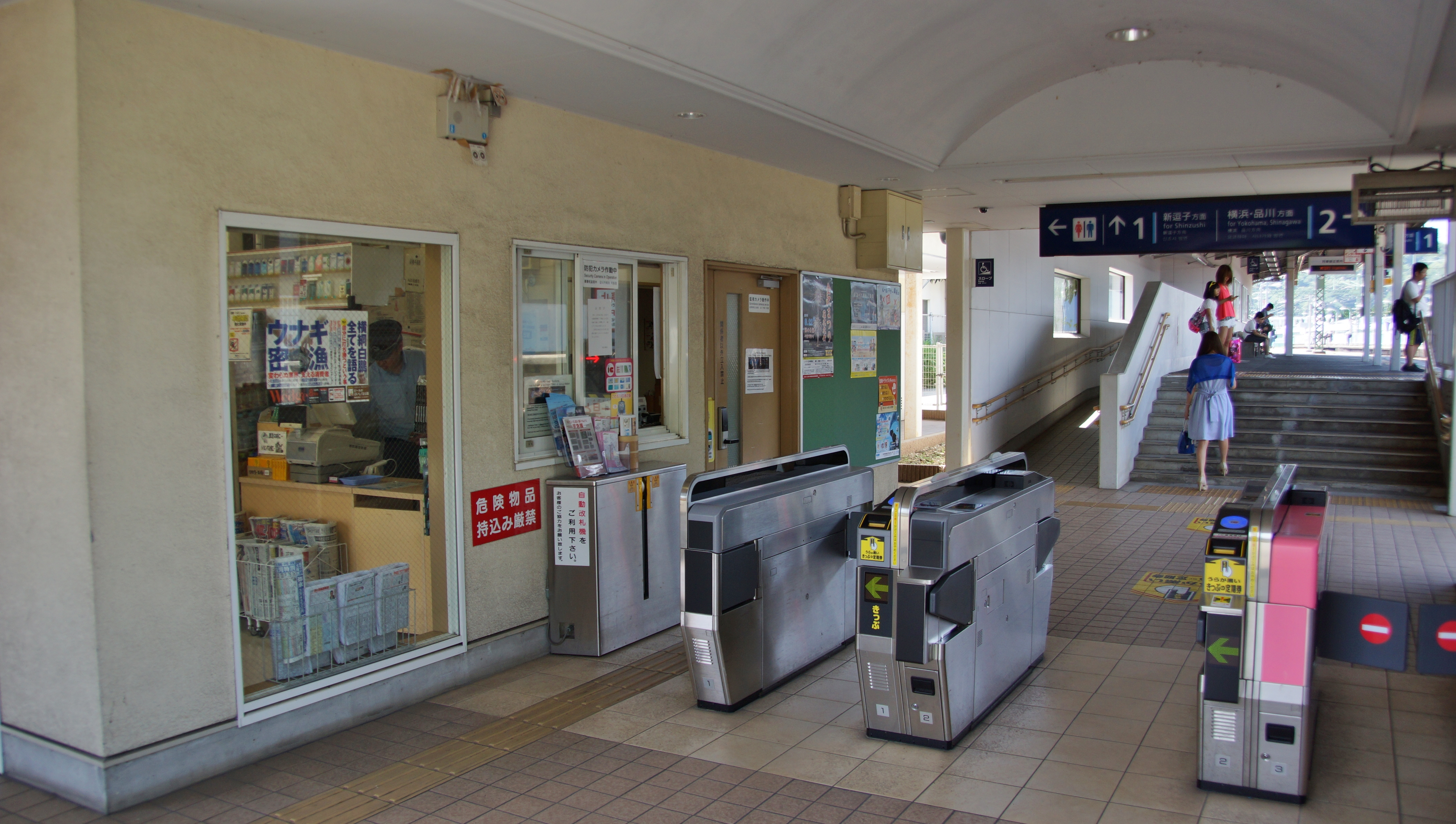
The ticket barriers in July 2015

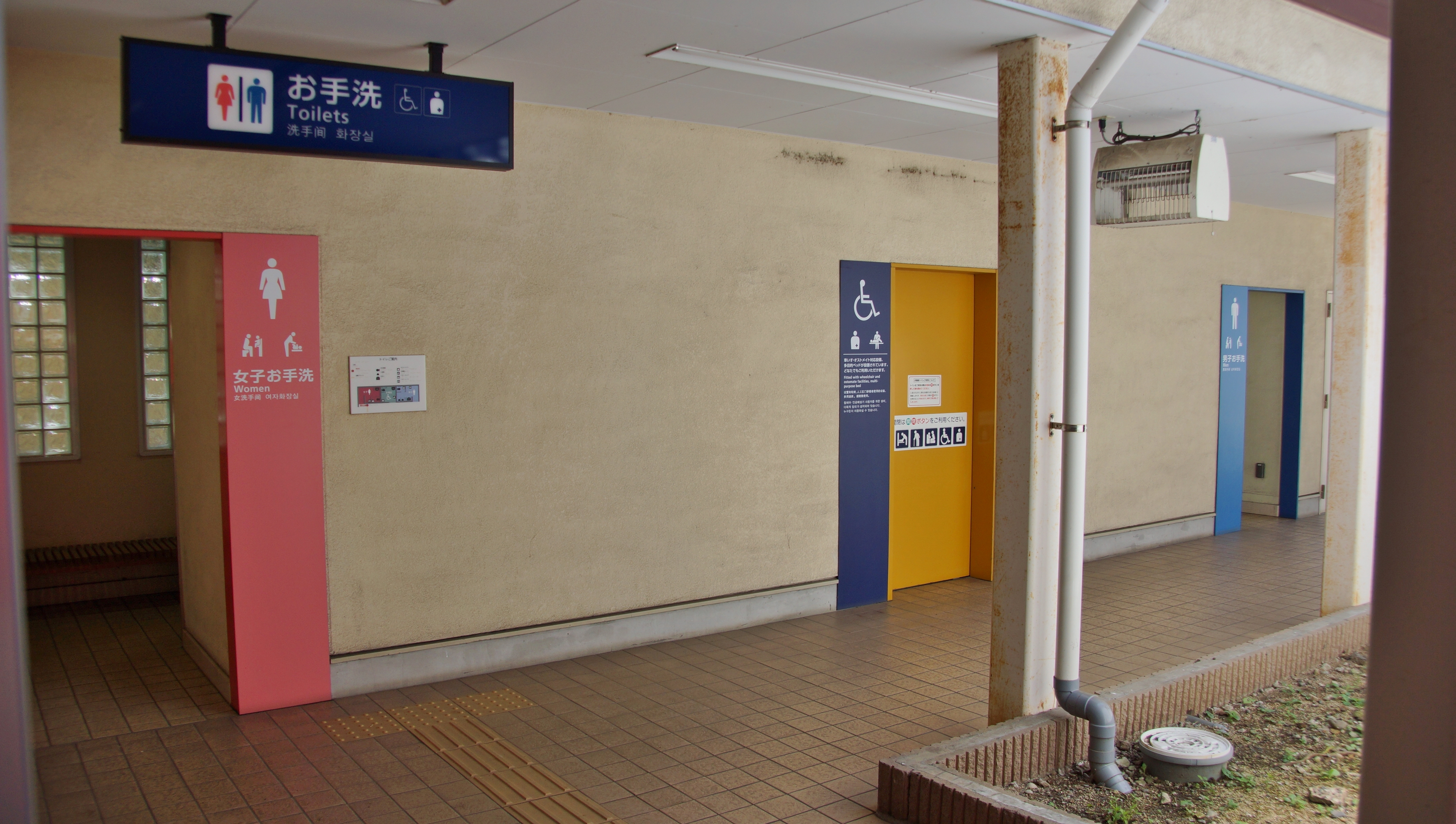
The station toilets in July 2015

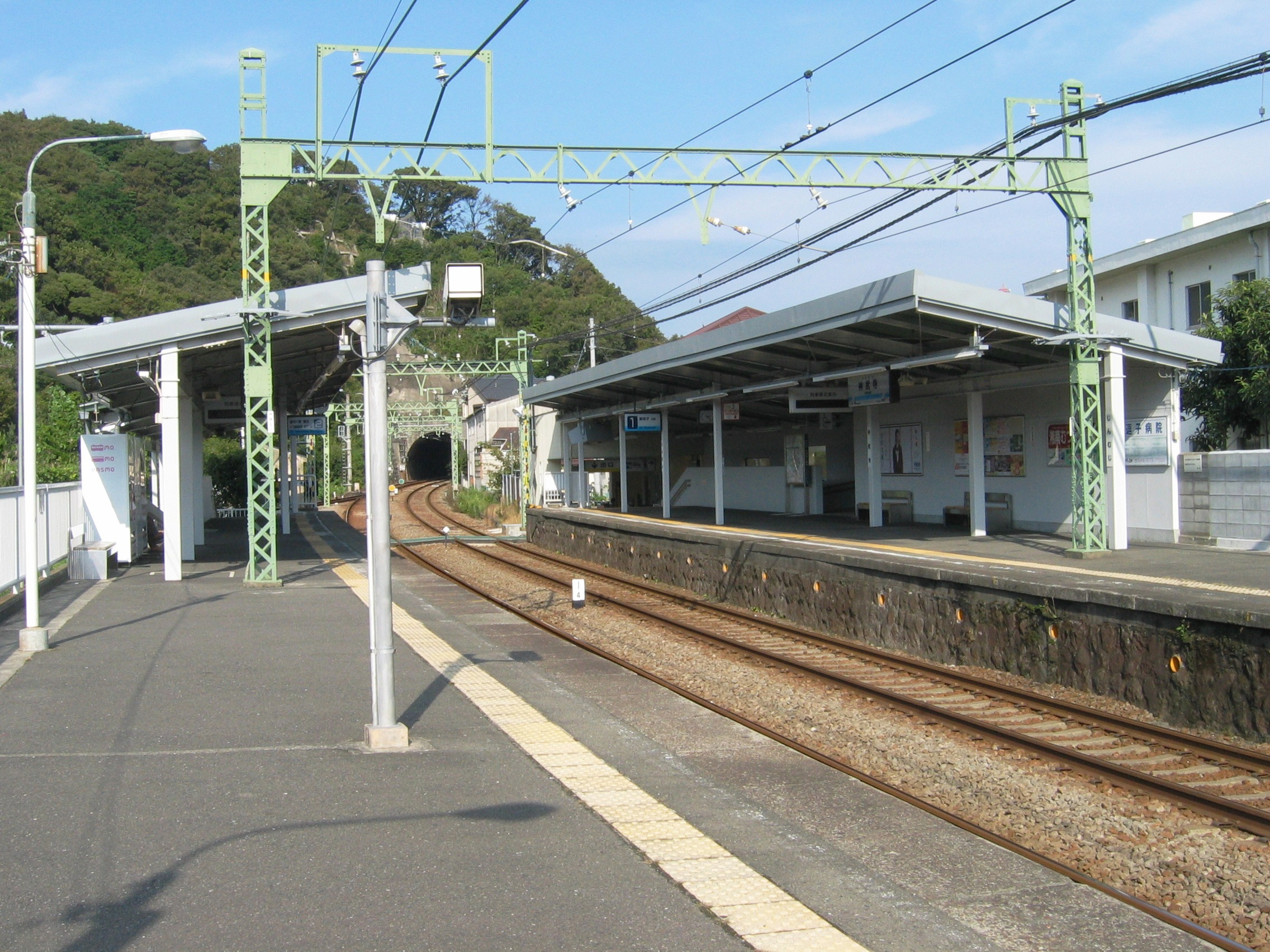
Jimmuji Station platforms and tracks

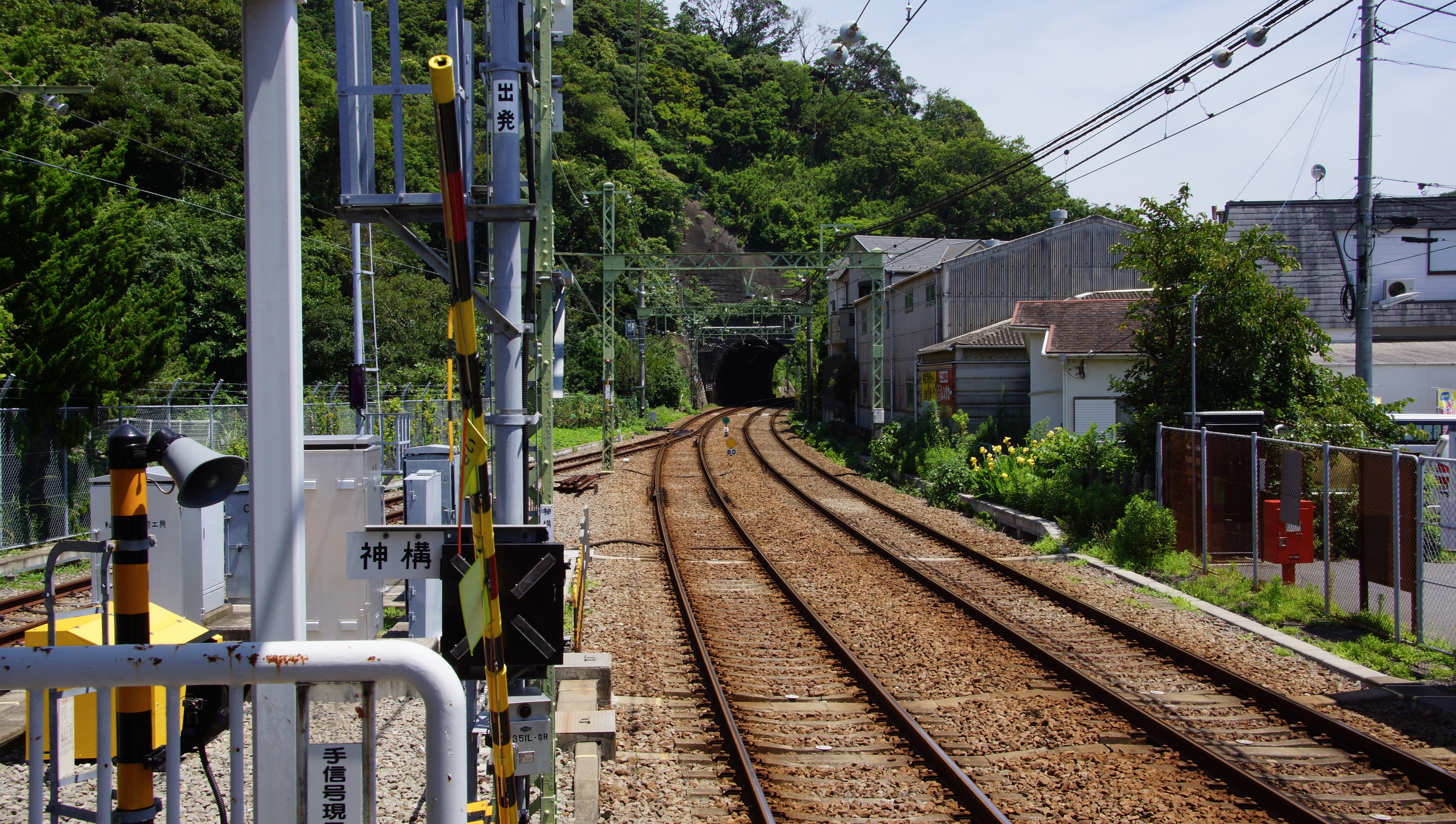
The view from the platform looking north, with the narrow-gauge connecting track visible on the left, July 2015

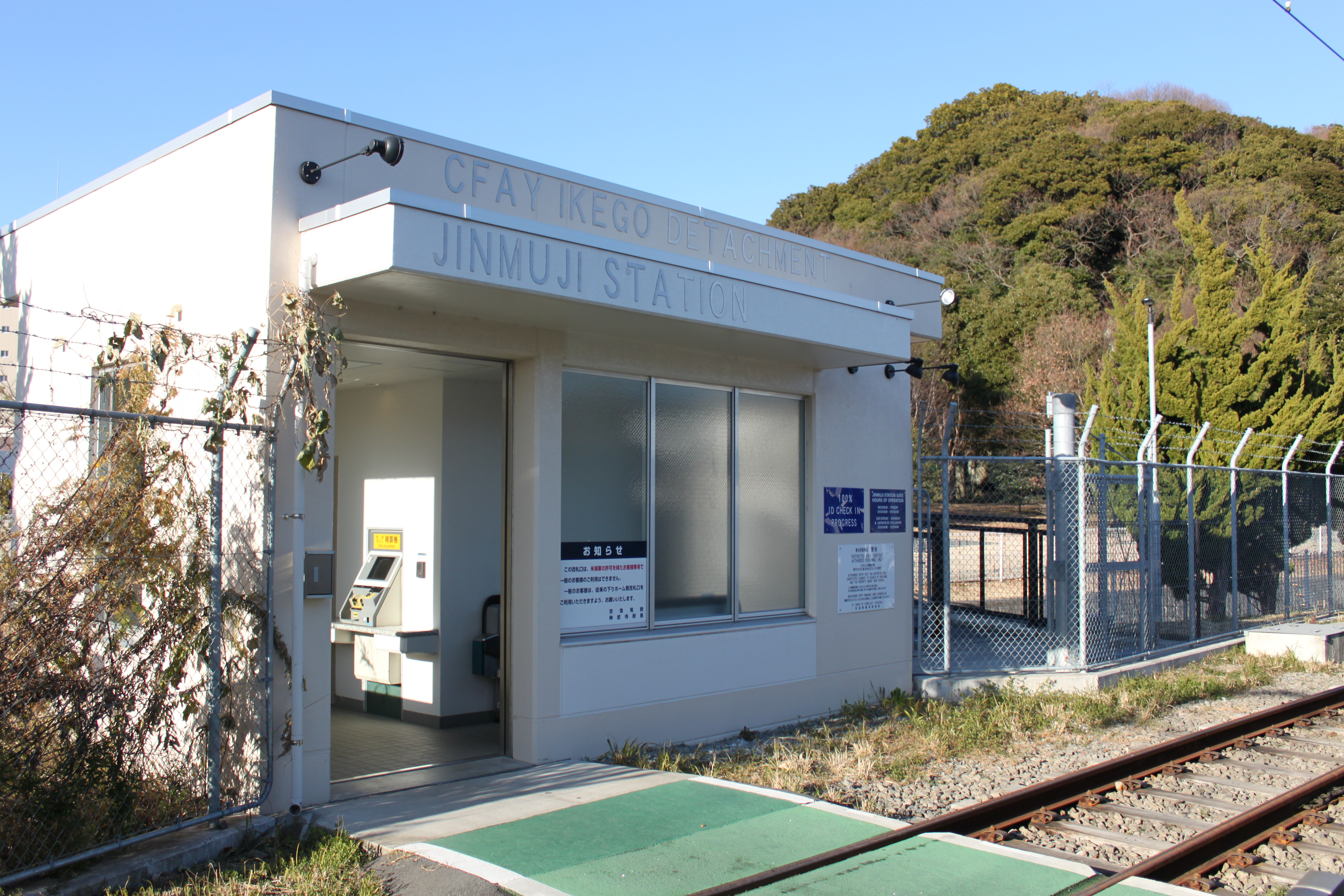
The gate connecting CFAY Ikego Housing Detachment to Jimmuji Station

== History ==
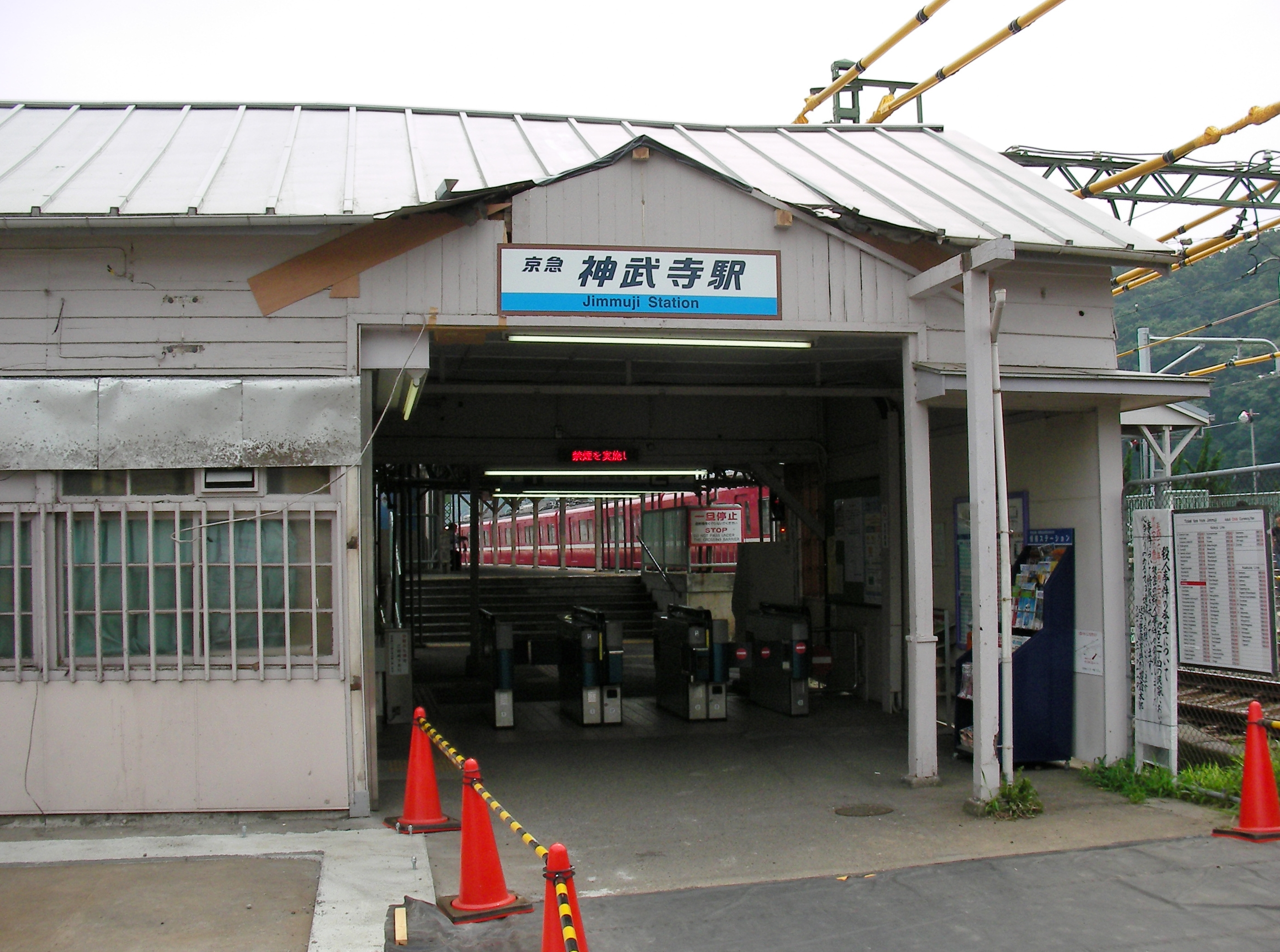
The station entrance in July 2006

Jimmuji Station opened on April 1, 1931, as a temporary stop on the Shōnan Electric Railway, the predecessor to the current Keikyu. It was initially located 300 meters towards Kanagawa Hakkei than the present station. It became a full station on June 11, 1936. In 1942, the Shōnan Electric Railway became part of the Tokyu Corporation, and Jimmuji Station was relocated to its present address on September 1, 1944. In 1948, the Keihin Electric Railway (later Keikyu) spun out from the Tokyu Corporation. A new station building was completed in March 2007.

Keikyū introduced station numbering to its stations on 21 October 2010; Jimmuji Station was assigned station number KK52.

== Surrounding area ==
- CFAY Ikego Housing Detachment
- Kanagawa Prefectural Zushi High School
- Toshoji Temple (東昌寺)
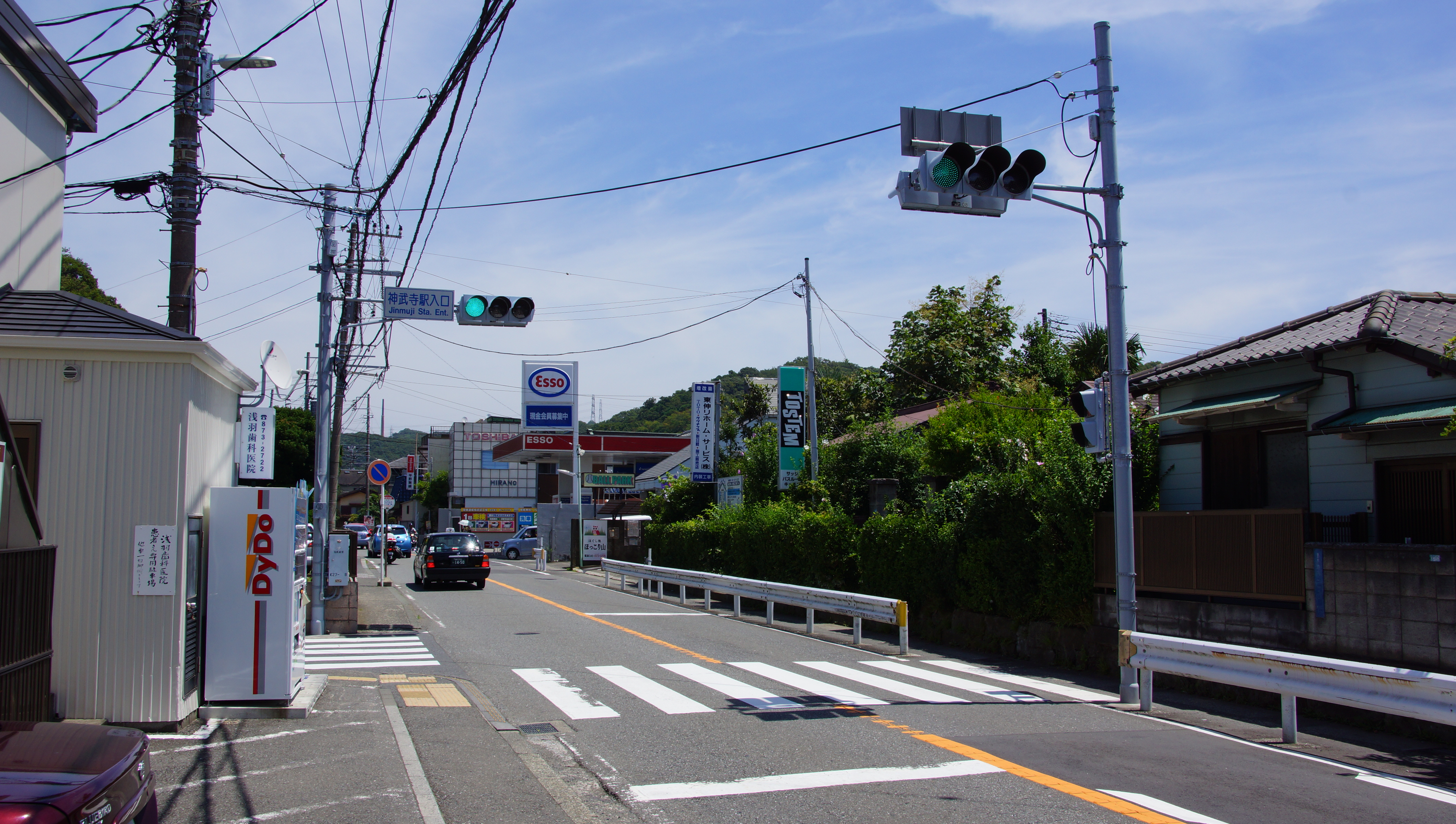
Prefectural Route 205 in front of the station in July 2015

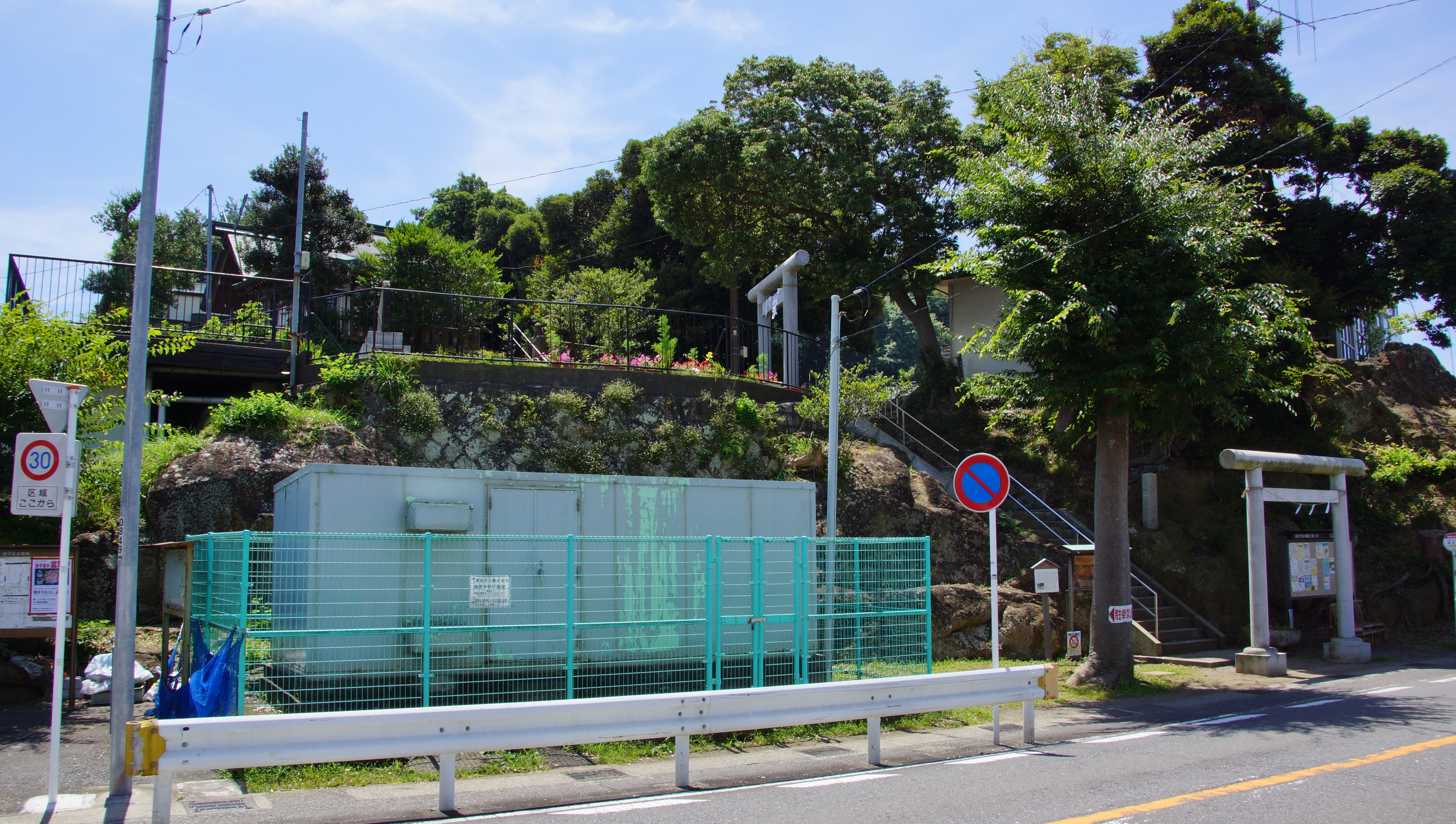
Toshoji Temple in July 2015

== See also ==
- List of railway stations in Japan
