= Ritomo Miyata =

Japanese racing driver (born 1999)

- 宮田 莉朋
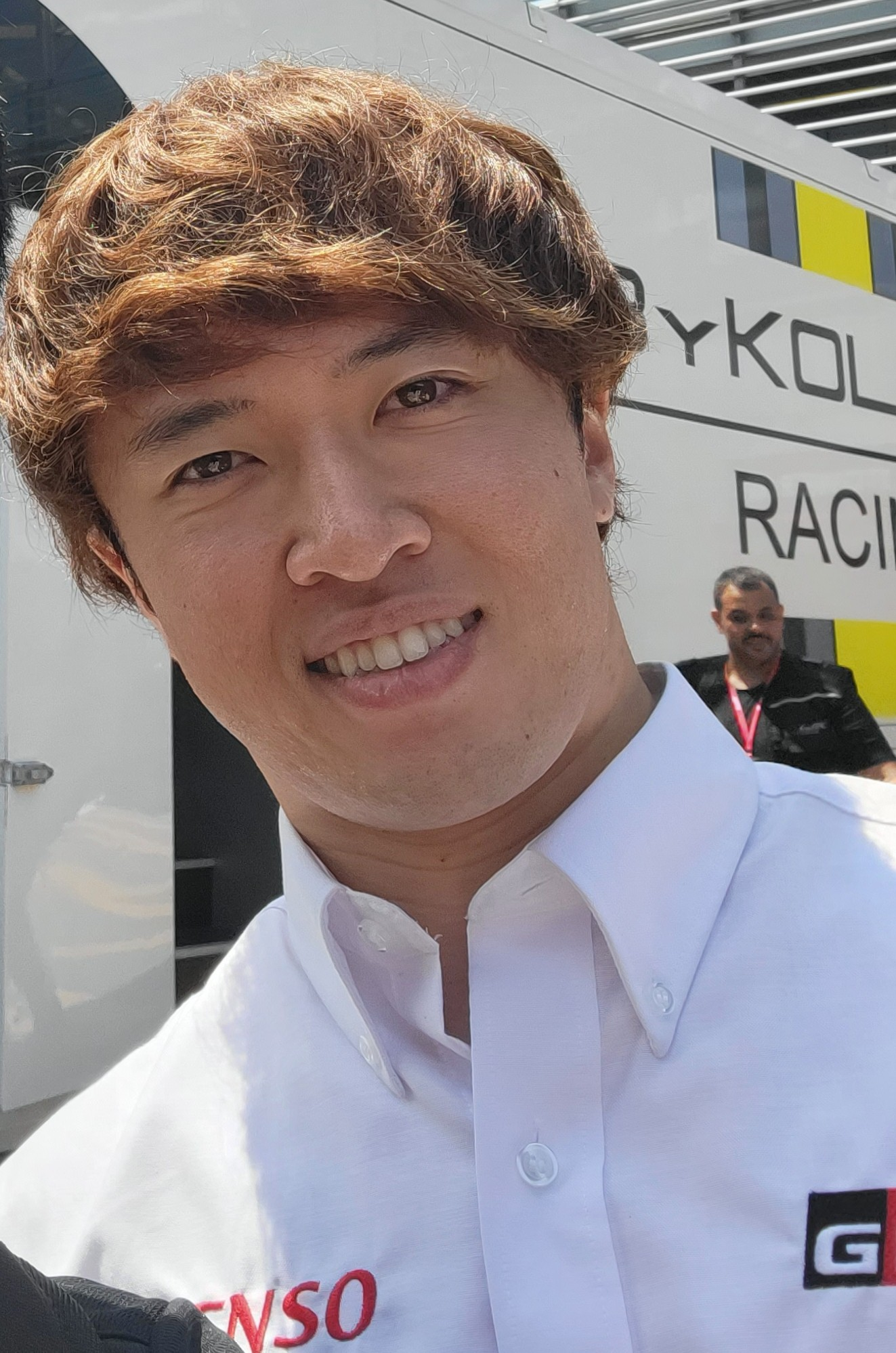
- Miyata at the 2023 6 Hours of Monza
- Born: 10 August 1999 (age 27); Zushi, Kanagawa, Japan
- Nationality: (Japan) Japanese

FIA Formula 2 Championship career
- Debut season: 2024
- Current team: Hitech
- Categorisation: FIA Gold (until 2023); FIA Platinum (2024–present)
- Car number: 3
- Former teams: Rodin, ART Grand Prix
- Starts: 73
- Wins: 1
- Podiums: 1
- Poles: 0
- Fastest laps: 2
- Best finish: 17th in 2025
- Statistics up to date as of 25 August 2026.

Super Formula career
- Years active: 2020–2023
- Teams: TOM'S
- Starts: 28
- Championships: 1 (2023)
- Wins: 2
- Podiums: 8
- Poles: 0
- Fastest laps: 3

Super GT career
- Years active: 2018–2023
- Teams: LM, TOM'S, Bandoh, CarGuy MKS Racing
- Starts: 50
- Championships: 1 (2023)
- Wins: 5
- Podiums: 10
- Poles: 3
- Fastest laps: 1
- Best finish: 1st in 2023 (GT500)

Previous series
- 2024; 2018–2023; 2020; 2019; 2017–2019; 2015–2017: ELMS; Super Taikyu; Super Formula Lights; WTCC; Japanese F3; F4 Japanese

Championship titles
- 2020; 2016, 2017: Super Formula Lights; F4 Japanese Championship

Ritomo Miyata (Japanese: 宮田 莉朋, Hepburn: Miyata Ritomo; born 10 August 1999) is a Japanese racing driver who competes in the FIA Formula 2 Championship for Hitech TGR as part of the TGR Driver Challenge Program and serves as a reserve driver in the FIA World Endurance Championship for Toyota. In Japanese motorsport, Miyata won the Super Formula Championship and Super GT, both in 2023 with TOM'S.

A member of the TGR Driver Challenge Program from 2017 to 2021 and since 2025, Miyata has been competing in Formula 2 since 2024. He previously won the 2020 Super Formula Lights championship, as well as back-to-back titles in the F4 Japanese Championship.

== Early and personal life ==
Miyata is a graduate of Yokohama High School. His name comes from the Fiat Ritmo, named as such by his parents as they were car enthusiasts. He was diagnosed with autism early in his childhood and was unable to adjust to school life during his kindergarten and elementary schooling years, spending much of his early life receiving counseling at various hospitals; he uses racing as a method of subduing his traits.

Miyata is an avid gamer, bringing his computer and consoles to races. As of September 2023, Miyata has over 500 race wins from 1,000 starts in iRacing official events and also participates in esports racing events for BS+COMPETITION.

Miyata was married to an unnamed wife. They have a child together. The couple divorced in the spring of 2026.

== Early career in Japan ==
Miyata started his motorsport career in karting in 2004, winning the All-Japan Kart Championship KF class title in 2014. In 2015, after his sixteenth birthday, he made his formula racing debut in the Formula 4 Japanese Championship with the RSS team at the last three race weekends of the season. Despite his limited experience, he finished in the top-ten in three of the six races, including a podium finish at Autopolis. He finished 15th in the standings with 24 points.

=== First Japanese F4 championship (2016) ===
In 2016, Miyata made his full-time Japanese F4 debut with Toyota-backed TOM'S Spirit. He won two races at Fuji Speedway and took podium finishes in three other races, and won the championship by just four points over Honda-sponsored driver Ukyo Sasahara.

=== All-Japan Formula Three debut and second Japanese F4 championship (2017) ===
In 2017, Miyata raced a dual program in Japanese F4 and the All-Japan Formula Three Championship, driving in both series with TOM'S (TOM'S Spirit in F4). He won his second consecutive F4 title with four wins and 11 podiums, including a sweep of the two races at Fuji during the Golden Week holiday. He defeated Sasahara for the second year, this time by a margin of seven points, while finishing 58 points ahead of third-place driver Yuki Tsunoda.

In his debut Formula 3 season, Miyata achieved ten podium finishes and finished fourth in the championship with 79 points, behind Mitsunori Takaboshi, Sho Tsuboi and Álex Palou. At the end of the year, he made his debut in the Macau Grand Prix, finishing 12th.

=== All-Japan F3/Super Formula Lights (2018–2020) ===
Miyata continued in All-Japan F3 for a second season with TOM'S. He won his first race at Fuji on 8 July, followed by a second win at Okayama on 28 July. These two wins propelled him to second in the championship behind his teammate Tsuboi, who won the championship and the other seventeen races that year. Miyata finished 13th in his second Macau Grand Prix start.

Miyata returned for a third season of All-Japan F3 in 2019. Miyata won eight races, including five of the last eight, but finished second in the standings again, this time to former Renault Sport Academy driver Sacha Fenestraz of B-Max Racing Team.

2019 was the last season for the All-Japan Formula Three Championship, which was renamed Super Formula Lights in 2020. Miyata returned for a fourth season in this category. Beginning with a sweep of the opening round at Twin Ring Motegi, Miyata won 12 out of 17 races and clinched the championship with a win in the penultimate race meeting at Suzuka Circuit.

== Super GT and Super Formula career ==
=== Super GT ===
==== GT300 (2018–2019) ====
Miyata made his debut in Super GT in 2018, driving in the GT300 class for Lexus customer team LM corsa. At 18 years old, he recorded his first podium finish at Chang International Circuit in Buriram, Thailand, where he and co-driver Hiroki Yoshimoto finished third.

LM corsa changed tyre suppliers from Yokohama to Dunlop in 2019, and Miyata returned for his second season. In the sixth round at Autopolis, Miyata took his first career win after a late-race charge from Yoshimoto to take the lead with four laps to go. Miyata and Yoshimoto also won both races of the auto sport Web Sprint Cup, a GT3 and GT300-only support race held during the inaugural Super GT x DTM Dream Race weekend at Fuji Speedway.

Earlier that season, Miyata made his one-off GT500 debut at the Fuji GT 500 km Race, when he substituted for Kazuki Nakajima at TOM'S, driving the number 36 Lexus LC 500 alongside Yuhi Sekiguchi.

==== GT500 (2020–2023) ====
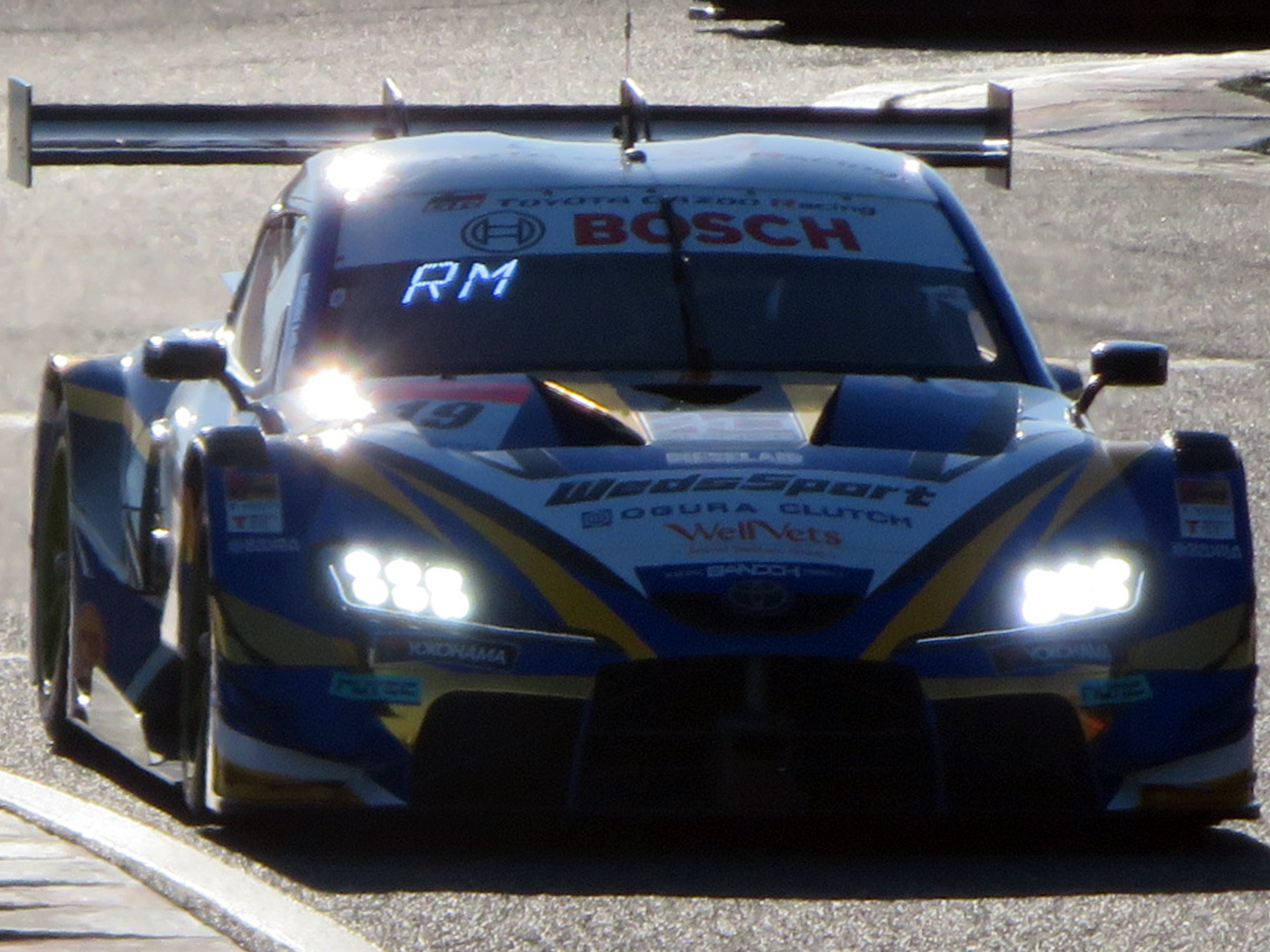
Miyata made his full-time Super GT GT500 debut in 2020 with Racing Project Bandoh.

In 2020, Toyota Gazoo Racing confirmed that Miyata would step up to GT500 full-time with TGR Team WedsSport Bandoh, driving the new Toyota GR Supra GT500 alongside Yuji Kunimoto. Miyata scored five top-ten finishes including a best finish of seventh place in round five at Fuji.

Miyata remained at the WedsSport Bandoh team for a second season in 2021. He scored his first pole position at the Fuji 500 km, and finished second at the following round in Motegi for his first GT500 podium. Miyata and Kunimoto would finish second again in the seventh round at Motegi, ending the season 11th in the drivers' standings.

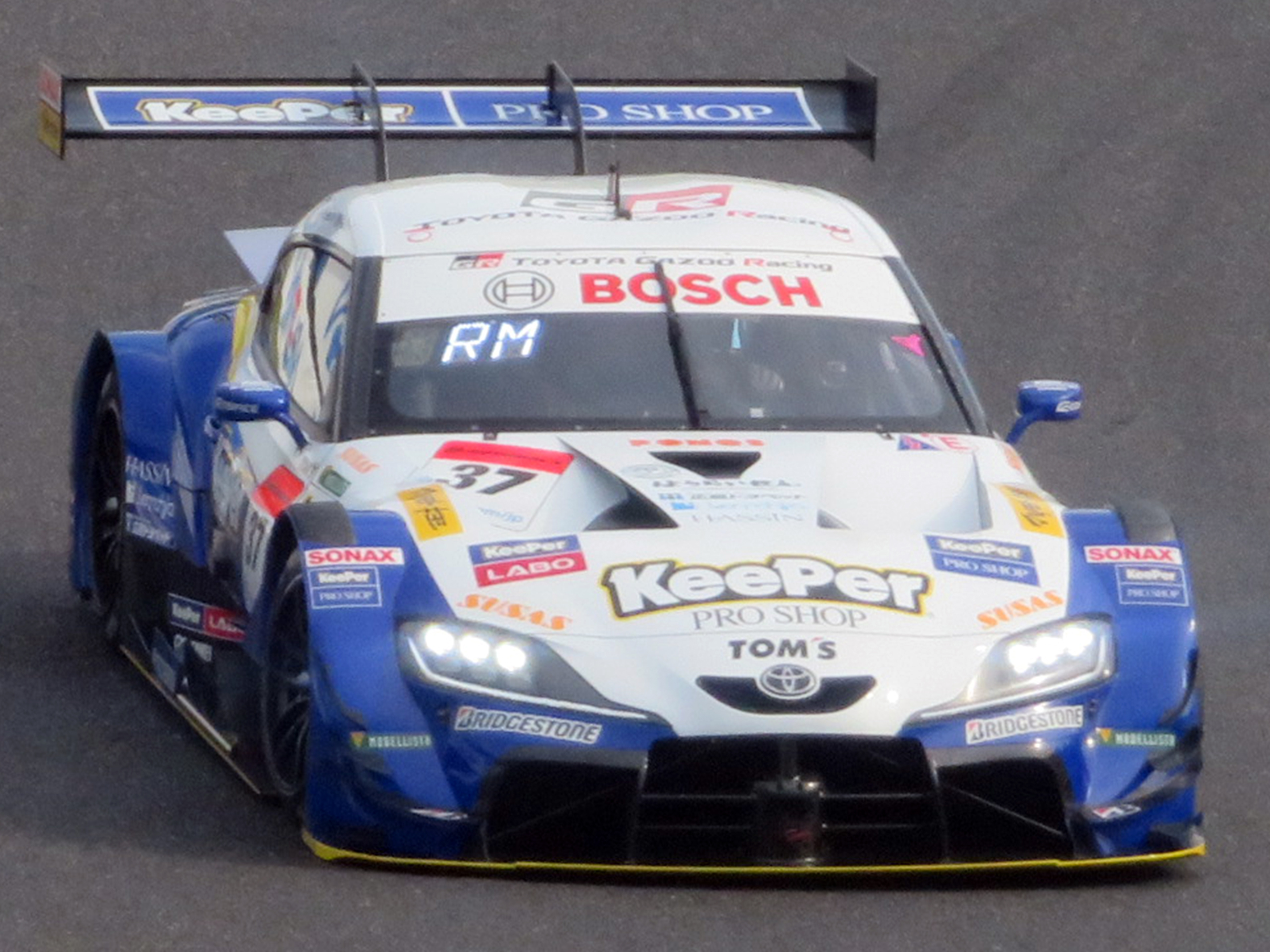
Miyata drove for TOM's in the 2022 Super GT Series GT500 class.

After two seasons, Miyata transferred to TOM'S for the 2022 season. He joined the number 37 team, replacing World Endurance Championship-bound Ryō Hirakawa and forming a new partnership with his one-time F3 rival Sacha Fenestraz. The combination of Miyata and Fenestraz had an impressive season highlighted by both drivers' first career GT500 wins, during the Fuji GT 450 km Race in August. Miyata and Fenestraz finished sixth in the drivers' championship with six top-ten finishes and two podiums.

In 2023, Miyata moved over to the number 36 car, this time on a permanent basis with Sho Tsuboi as his co-driver. Miyata and Tsuboi won the Golden Week 450 km race at Fuji in only their second race together, then finished second in the following round at Suzuka. The pair won their second race at Autopolis in the penultimate round of the season, which gave them a seven-point lead going into the final race at Motegi. Late in the race, Miyata was running in second place, which would have given TOM'S the championship ahead of NDDP Racing drivers Katsumasa Chiyo and Mitsunori Takaboshi. Takaboshi spun off while leading, and Miyata took the lead with five laps to go. Miyata and Tsuboi clinched the championship with their third win of the season.

This made Miyata the fifth driver to win both the Super GT GT500 and Super Formula championships in the same year, joining Pedro de la Rosa (1997), Satoshi Motoyama (2003), Richard Lyons (2004), and Naoki Yamamoto (2018 and 2020).

=== Super Formula (2020–2023) ===
Due to Kazuki Nakajima's commitments in the FIA World Endurance Championship and the travel restrictions mandated during the COVID-19 pandemic, Miyata made his Super Formula championship debut in 2020, replacing Nakajima at Vantelin Team TOM'S for two races. He qualified on the front row for his series debut at Okayama International Circuit, finished ninth in the race, then finished eighth in his second start at Autopolis.

After winning the Super Formula Lights championship, Miyata earned a full-time Super Formula drive with TOM'S in 2021, replacing the departing Nick Cassidy. Miyata had six top-ten finishes in seven races, and finished tenth in the championship with a best finish of fourth in a rain-shortened race at Autopolis. Miyata took another step forward in 2022, the last season for the Dallara SF19 chassis. He got his first podium finish, a third place, in the second round at Fuji. He finished the season with another third place in the final round at Suzuka, and was fourth in the final championship standings.

The new Dallara SF23 made its debut in 2023, Miyata's fourth season in Super Formula. In the third round of the season at Suzuka, Miyata took his first career win. He got his second win in round five at Sugo, ahead of two-time series champion Tomoki Nojiri. A third-place finish at the season-ending JAF Grand Prix at Suzuka was enough for Miyata to clinch the championship ahead of Red Bull Racing reserve driver Liam Lawson and Nojiri. Miyata scored a total of six podium finishes and finished all nine races inside the top-five.

== FIA Formula 2 career (2024–present) ==
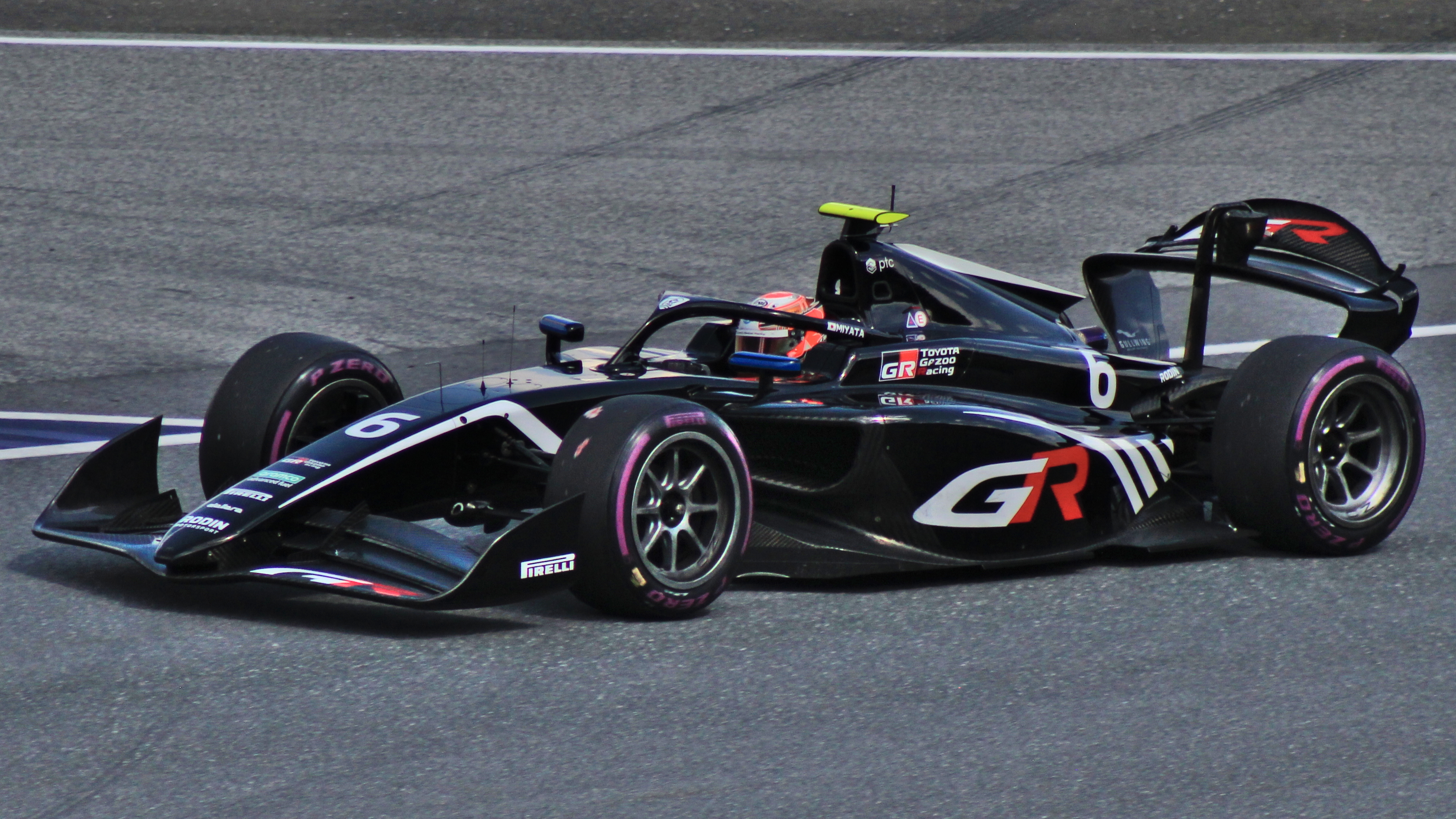
Miyata driving the Dallara F2 2024 during the 2024 Spielberg Formula 2 round

=== 2024 ===
On 14 November 2023, Toyota announced that Miyata would enter the 2024 FIA Formula 2 Championship. Two weeks later, he would be confirmed to drive for Rodin Motorsport (formerly Rodin Carlin) alongside Zane Maloney. Miyata recorded his first points-paying finish at Bahrain International Circuit.

=== 2025 ===
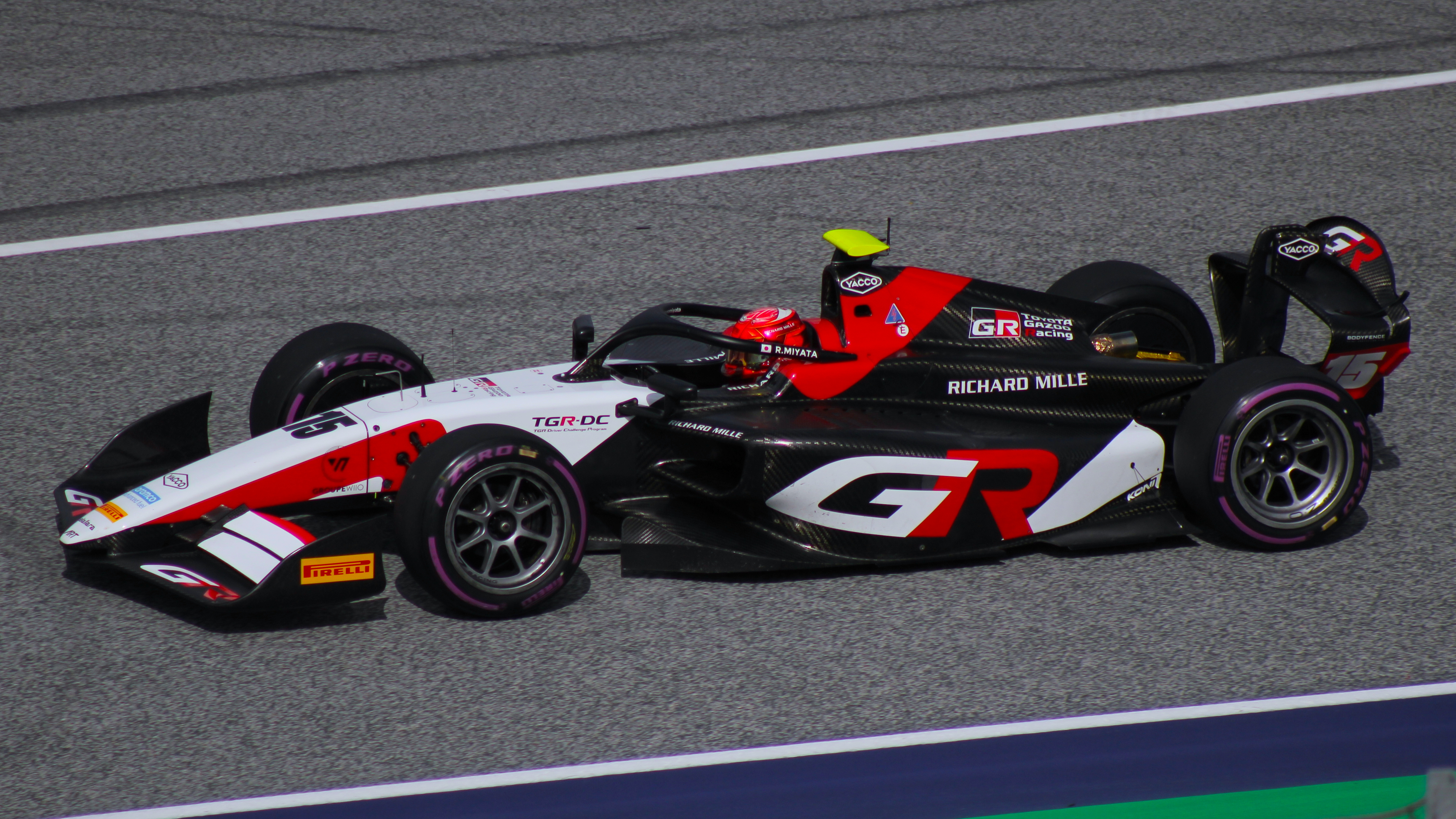
Miyata driving for ART Grand Prix during the 2025 Spielberg Formula 2 round

Miyata continued in Formula 2 for 2025, this time moving over to ART Grand Prix.

=== 2026 ===
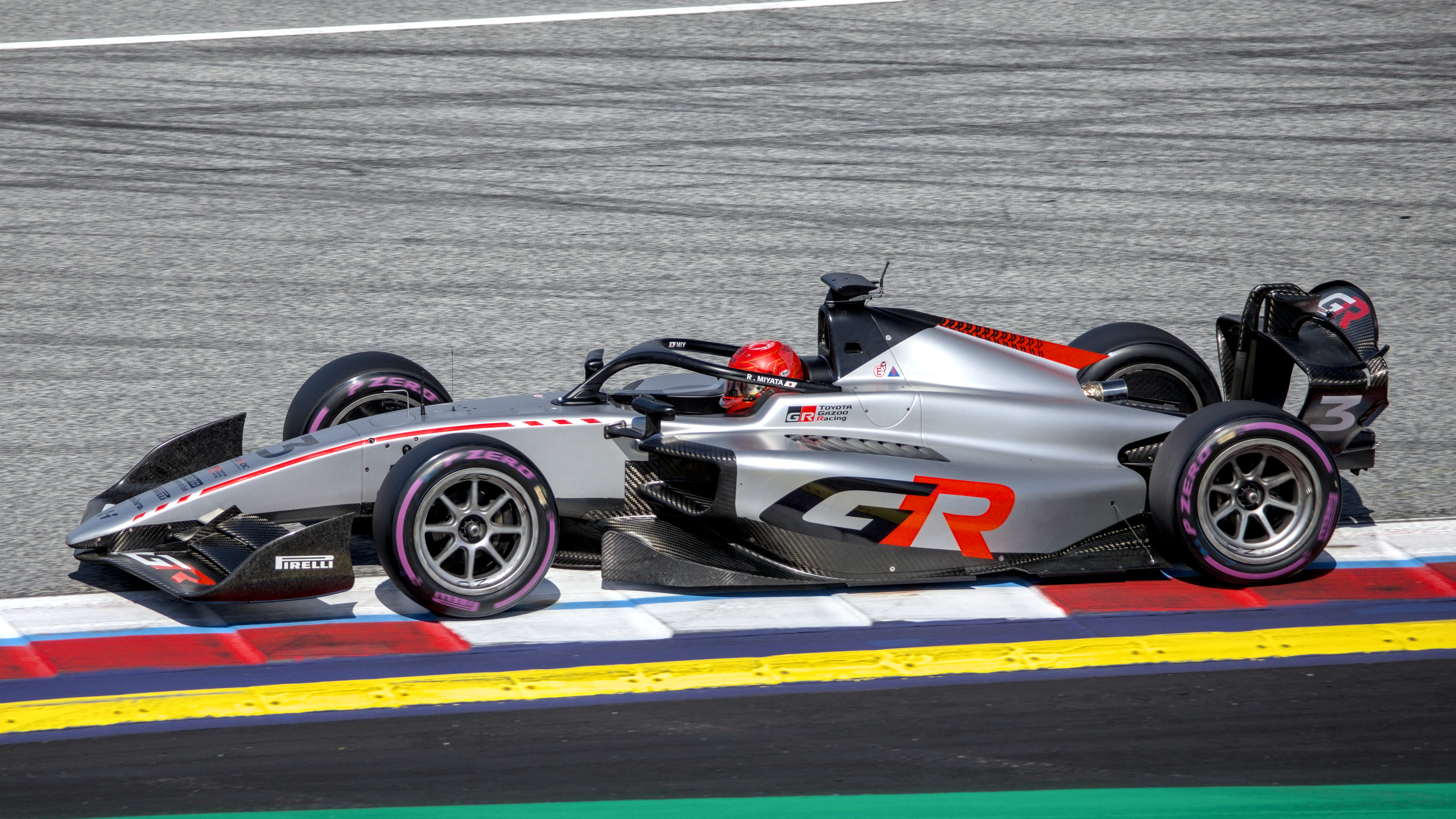
Miyata driving for Hitech TGR during the 2026 Spielberg Formula 2 round

Miyata remained in the series for a third season in 2026, joining Hitech alongside Colton Herta. He won the Sprint Race at the new Madring circuit in Spain, his first win in the series.

== Formula One career ==
Due to the technical partnership agreement that Toyota Gazoo Racing and Haas F1 Team signed in October 2024, Miyata drove a Haas VF-23 of the American team in private tests in Jerez in January 2025 alongside the team's official drivers, Esteban Ocon and Oliver Bearman. In 2025, Miyata also conducted tests with Alpine in May at Zandvoort and in June at Monza.

== Endurance racing career (2023–2024) ==
=== 2023 season: WEC debut ===
On 30 May 2023, Toyota Gazoo Racing announced that Miyata was selected as a WEC Challenge programme driver, with the goal of developing a career path towards the top category of the FIA World Endurance Championship. Miyata joined Toyota Gazoo Racing in a non-driving role at the 2023 24 Hours of Le Mans and the 6 Hours of Monza later that season.

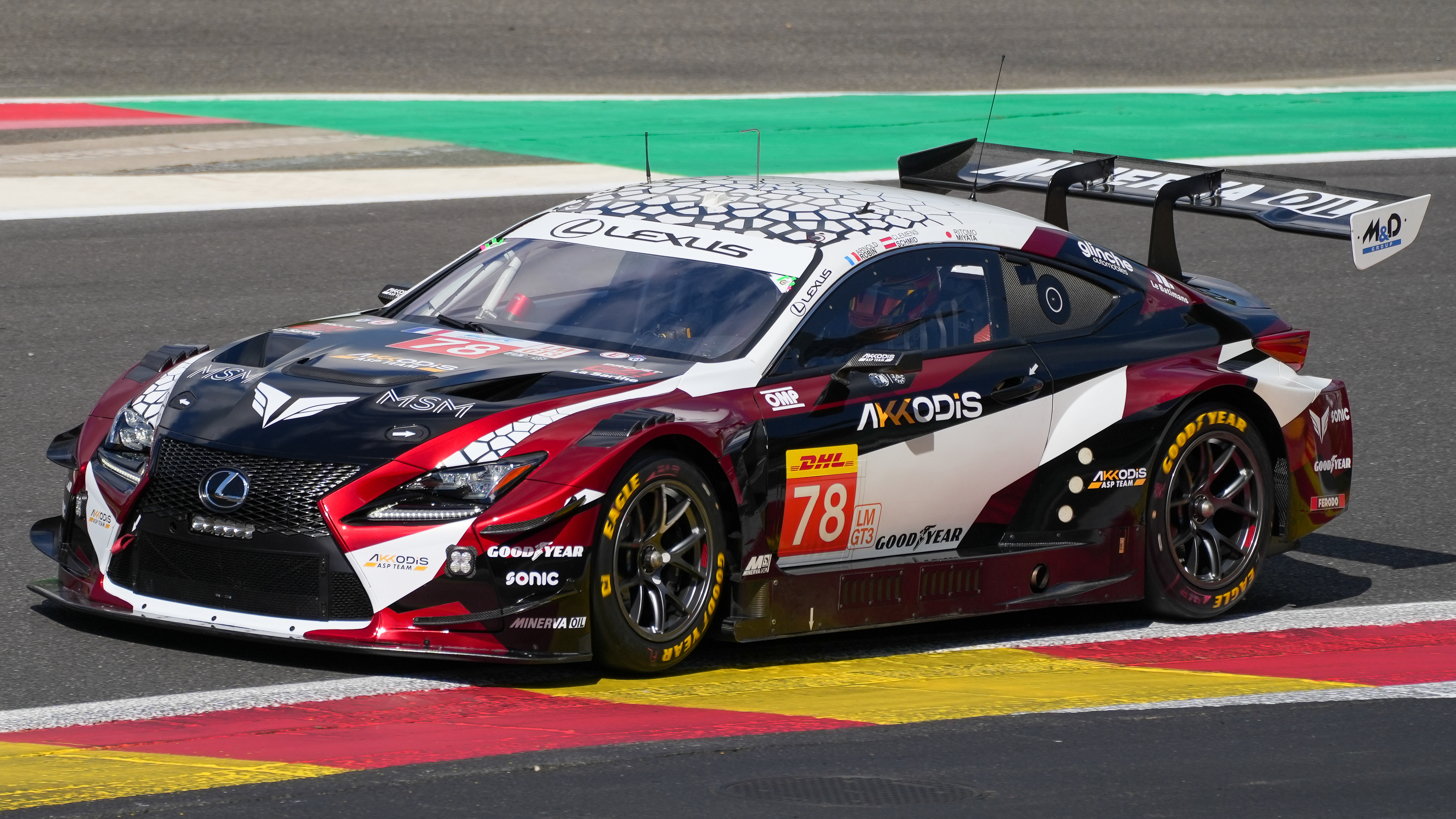
The No. 78 RC F LMGT3 belonging to Miyata, Arnold Robin, and Clemens Schmid during the 2024 6 Hours of Spa-Francorchamps

At the 6 Hours of Fuji, Miyata made his WEC race debut in the LMGTE Am class, driving a Ferrari 488 GTE Evo for Kessel Racing with the blessing of Toyota. Miyata finished third in class, after he was demoted from second place following a post-race time penalty for not reducing his speed in time during a Full Course Yellow. He returned to the WEC at the 2024 6 Hours of Spa-Francorchamps, replacing Kelvin van der Linde in the No. 78 Akkodis ASP Team Lexus RC F LMGT3.

=== 2024 season: ELMS ===
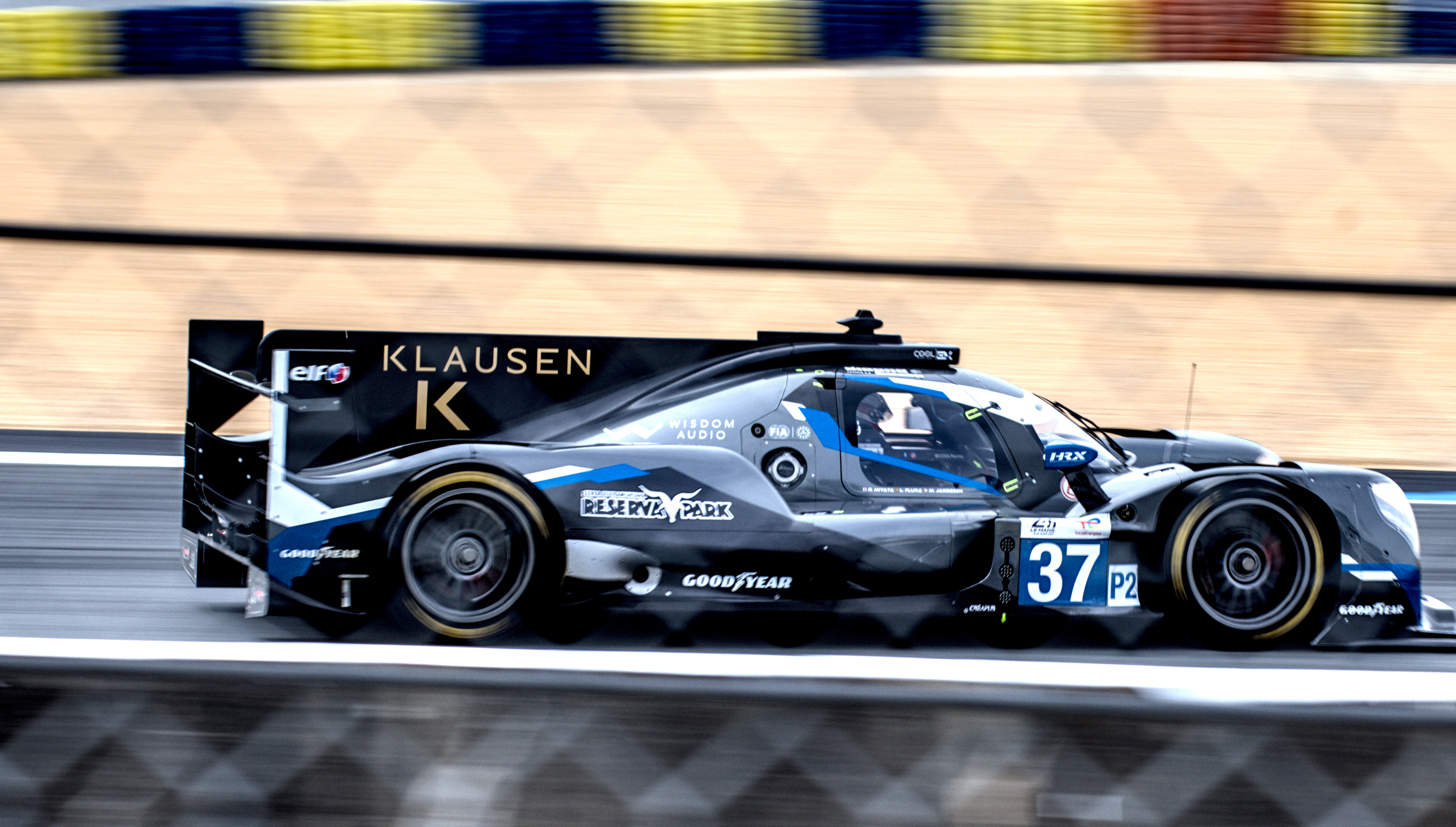
Miyata's No. 37 car at the 2024 24 Hours of Le Mans

In November 2023, Miyata was confirmed to race in the European Le Mans Series LMP2 class with Cool Racing, alongside Peugeot Sport development driver Malthe Jakobsen and Lorenzo Fluxá. Miyata won in his first start in the series at the 4 Hours of Barcelona.

=== Other series ===
Miyata entered the 2019 World Touring Car Cup Race of Japan at Suzuka, driving an Audi RS 3 LMS TCR for Audi Team Hitotsuyama as a wildcard entry. Miyata was scheduled to compete in the 2020 Suzuka 10 Hours for Hitotsuyama in an Audi R8 LMS GT3, but the race was cancelled due to the effects of the COVID-19 pandemic.

Beginning in 2018, Miyata began competing in the Super Taikyu Series. He made his debut in the ST-3 class with Le Beausset Motorsports, where he helped the team to a runner-up finish in the championship. He then competed the ST-4 class with Endless Sports from 2019 to 2020. From 2021 to 2023, he drove Audi Team Hitotsuyama, beginning with a one-off ST-X class drive at the Fuji 24 Hours in an Audi R8 LMS GT3, then in the ST-Z class in an Audi R8 LMS GT4 in 2022 and 2023.

Miyata made his IMSA WeatherTech Sportscar Championship debut at the 2024 24 Hours of Daytona, driving a Lexus RC F GT3 for Vasser Sullivan Racing. Miyata and co-drivers Frankie Montecalvo, Parker Thompson, and Aaron Telitz started from pole position in the GT Daytona (GTD) class but retired in the final hour after the car caught fire after a pit stop.

== Racing record ==
=== Racing career summary ===
Season	Series	Team	Races	Wins	Poles	F/Laps	Podiums	Points	Position
2015	F4 Japanese Championship	RSS	6	0	0	0	1	24	15th
2016	F4 Japanese Championship	TOM'S Spirit	14	2	2	3	5	142	**1st**
2017	F4 Japanese Championship	TOM'S Spirit	14	4	5	6	11	231	**1st**
2017	Japanese Formula 3 Championship	Team TOM'S	18	0	0	2	10	79	4th
2017	Macau Grand Prix	Team TOM'S	1	0	0	0	0	N/A	12th
2018	Japanese Formula 3 Championship	Team TOM'S	19	2	2	2	15	117	**2nd**
2018	Macau Grand Prix	Team TOM'S	1	0	0	0	0	N/A	13th
2018	Super GT - GT300	LM corsa	8	0	0	0	1	23	15th
2018	Super Taikyu - ST-3	Le Beausset Motorsports	6	1	1	0	5	129‡	**2nd‡**
2019	Japanese Formula 3 Championship	Corolla Chukyo Kuo TOM'S	20	8	10	10	15	142	**2nd**
2019	Super GT - GT300	LM corsa	7	1	0	0	1	25	12th
2019	Super GT - GT500	Lexus Team au TOM'S	1	0	0	0	0	0	NC
2019	World Touring Car Cup	Audi Sport Team Hitotsuyama	3	0	0	0	0	0	NC†
2019	Super Taikyu - ST-4	Endless Sports	5	1	0	1	4	89‡	4th‡
2020	Super Formula Lights	TOM'S	17	12	6	15	16	153	**1st**
2020	Super Formula	Vantelin Team TOM'S	2	0	0	0	0	7	17th
2020	Super GT - GT500	TGR Team WedsSport Bandoh	8	0	0	0	0	10	17th
2020	Super Taikyu - ST-4	Endless Sports	4	0	0	0	3	74‡	4th‡
2021	Super GT - GT500	TGR Team WedsSport Bandoh	8	0	2	1	2	36	11th
2021	Super Formula	Kuo Vantelin Team TOM'S	7	0	0	0	0	22	10th
2021	Super Taikyu - ST-X	Audi Team Hitotsuyama	1	0	0	0	0	18‡	8th‡
2022	Super GT - GT500	TGR Team KeePer TOM'S	8	1	0	0	2	43	6th
2022	Super Formula	Kuo Vantelin Team TOM'S	10	0	0	1	2	64	4th
2022	Super Taikyu - ST-Z	Audi Team Hitotsuyama	5	0	0	0	2	77‡	7th‡
2022	Super Taikyu - ST-Z	Audi Driving Experience Japan	1	0	0	0	0	3‡	10th‡
2023	Super GT - GT500	TGR Team au TOM'S	8	3	1	0	4	89	**1st**
2023	Super Formula	Vantelin Team TOM'S	9	2	0	2	6	114.5	**1st**
2023	FIA World Endurance Championship - LMGTE Am	Kessel Racing	1	0	0	0	1	15	20th
2023	Super Taikyu - ST-Z	Audi Team Hitotsuyama	3	0	0	1	0	73‡	5th‡
2024	FIA Formula 2 Championship	Rodin Motorsport	28	0	0	2	0	31	19th
2024	European Le Mans Series - LMP2	Cool Racing	5	2	0	0	2	62	**3rd**
2024	24 Hours of Le Mans - LMP2	Cool Racing	1	0	0	0	0	N/A	12th
2024	FIA World Endurance Championship - LMGT3	Akkodis ASP Team	1	0	0	0	0	1	31st
2024	IMSA SportsCar Championship - GTD	Vasser Sullivan	1	0	1	0	0	195	65th
2024	FIA World Endurance Championship - Hypercar	Toyota Gazoo Racing	Reserve driver						
2025	FIA Formula 2 Championship	ART Grand Prix	27	0	0	0	1	30	17th
2026	FIA Formula 2 Championship	Hitech	25	1	0	0	2	70	12th*
2026	Super GT - GT300	CarGuy MKS Racing	2	0	0	0	0	10	35th

* Season still in progress.
† As Miyata was a guest driver, he was ineligible to score points.
‡ Team standings.

=== Complete F4 Japanese Championship results ===
(key) (Races in bold indicate pole position) (Races in italics indicate fastest lap)

Year	Team	1	2	3	4	5	6	7	8	9	10	11	12	13	14	DC	Pts
2015	RSS	OKA; 1	OKA; 2	FUJ1; 1	FUJ1; 2	FUJ2; 1	FUJ2; 2	SUZ; 1	SUZ; 2	SUG; 1; 4	SUG; 2; 9	AUT; 1 Ret	AUT; 2; 3	MOT; 1; 14	MOT; 2; 27	15th	24
2016	TOM'S Spirit	OKA; 1; 5	OKA; 2 Ret	**FUJ1**; **1** Ret	FUJ1; 2; 2	SUG; 1 DSQ	SUG; 2; 2	**FUJ2**; **1**; 1	FUJ2; 2; 1	FUJ2; 3; 4	SUZ; 1; 6	SUZ; 2; 6	MOT; 1; 22	MOT; 2; 2	MOT; 3; 11	1st	142
2017	TOM'S Spirit	**OKA**; **1**; 2	**OKA**; **2**; 6	FUJ1; 1; 1	**FUJ1**; **2**; 1	AUT; 1; 3	AUT; 2; 4	SUG; 1 Ret	SUG; 2; 3	FUJ2; 1; 3	FUJ2; 2; 3	SUZ; 1; 2	SUZ; 2; 1	**MOT**; **1**; 1	**MOT**; **2**; 3	1st	231

=== Complete Japanese Formula Three Championship results ===
(key) (Races in bold indicate pole position) (Races in italics indicate fastest lap)

Year	Team	Engine	1	2	3	4	5	6	7	8	9	10	11	12	13	14	15	16	17	18	19	20	21	DC	Pts
2017	Team TOM'S	Toyota	OKA; 1; 3	OKA; 2; 3	OKA; 3; 3	SUZ; 1 DNS	SUZ; 2 DNS	FUJ; 1; 5	FUJ; 2; 3	OKA; 1; 2	OKA; 2; 2	SUZ; 1; 2	SUZ; 2; 4	FUJ; 1; 6	FUJ; 2; 5	MOT; 1; 4	MOT; 2; 8	MOT; 3; 4	AUT; 1; 4	AUT; 2; 2	SUG; 1; 2	SUG; 2; 3		4th	79
2018	Team TOM'S	Toyota	**SUZ**; **1**; 2	SUZ; 2; 2	SUG; 1; 2	SUG; 2; 2	FUJ; 1; 9	FUJ; 2; 1	**OKA**; **1**; 1	OKA; 2; 2	OKA; 3 C	MOT; 1; 2	MOT; 2; 2	MOT; 3; 2	OKA; 1; 5	OKA; 2; 3	OKA; 3 C	SUG; 1; 2	SUG; 2; 2	SUG; 3; 4	SUG; 4; 2	FUJ; 1; 6	FUJ; 2; 3	2nd	117
2019	Corolla Chukyo Kuo TOM'S	Toyota	**SUZ**; **1**; 2	**SUZ**; **2**; 1	AUT; 1; 7	AUT; 2; 8	AUT; 3; 6	OKA; 1; 3	OKA; 2; 1	OKA; 3; 3	**SUG**; **1**; 1	**SUG**; **2** DSQ	**FUJ**; **1** DSQ	**FUJ**; **2**; 3	**SUG**; **1**; 1	SUG; 2; 3	SUG; 3; 1	MOT; 1; 2	**MOT**; **2**; 1	MOT; 3; 2	**OKA**; **1**; 1	**OKA**; **2**; 1		2nd	142

=== Complete Super Formula Lights results ===
(key) (Races in bold indicate pole position) (Races in italics indicate fastest lap)

Year	Team	1	2	3	4	5	6	7	8	9	10	11	12	13	14	15	16	17	DC	Pts
2020	Corolla Chukyo Kuo TOM'S	**MOT**; **1**; 1	**MOT**; **2**; 1	MOT; 3; 1	**OKA**; **1**; 1	**OKA**; **2**; 2	SUG; 1; 1	SUG; 2; 2	SUG; 3; 1	**AUT**; **1**; 1	AUT; 2; 3	AUT; 3; 1	SUZ; 1; 1	SUZ; 2 Ret	SUZ; 3; 1	**FUJ**; **1**; 1	FUJ; 2; 3	FUJ; 3; 1	1st	153

=== Complete Super GT results ===
(key) (Races in bold indicate pole position) (Races in italics indicate fastest lap)

Year	Team	Car	Class	1	2	3	4	5	6	7	8	DC	Points
2018	LM corsa	Lexus RC F GT3	GT300	OKA; 17	FUJ; 7	SUZ; 5	CHA; 3	FUJ; Ret	SUG; 9	AUT; 12	MOT; 24	15th	23
2019	LM corsa	Lexus RC F GT3	GT300	OKA; 7		SUZ; 10	CHA; 15	FUJ; 22	AUT; 1	SUG; 19	MOT; 9	12th	25
2019	Lexus Team au TOM'S	Lexus LC500 GT500	GT500		FUJ; Ret							NC	0
2020	TGR Team WedsSport Bandoh	Toyota GR Supra GT500	GT500	FUJ; 9	FUJ; 15	SUZ; 10	MOT; Ret	FUJ; 7	SUZ; 9	MOT; 11	FUJ; 10	17th	10
2021	TGR Team WedsSport Bandoh	Toyota GR Supra GT500	GT500	OKA; 12	**FUJ**; 7	MOT; 2	SUZ; 13	SUG; Ret	AUT; 13	**MOT**; 2	FUJ; 13	11th	36
2022	TGR Team KeePer TOM'S	Toyota GR Supra GT500	GT500	OKA; 11	FUJ; 14	SUZ; 3	FUJ; 1	SUZ; 8	SUG; 9	AUT; 9	MOT; 6	6th	43
2023	TGR Team au TOM'S	Toyota GR Supra GT500	GT500	OKA; 15	FUJ; 1	**SUZ**; 2	FUJ; 4	SUZ; 10	SUG; 7	AUT; 1	MOT; 1	1st	89
2026	CarGuy MKS Racing	Ferrari 296 GT3 Evo	GT300	OKA	FUJ	FUJ	SUZ	SUG	AUT	MOT; Ret	MOT; 6	35th	10

=== Complete Super Formula results ===
(key) (Races in bold indicate pole position) (Races in italics indicate fastest lap)

Year	Team	Engine	1	2	3	4	5	6	7	8	9	10	DC	Points
2020	Vantelin Team TOM'S	Toyota	MOT	OKA; 9^{2}	SUG	AUT; 8	SUZ	SUZ	FUJ				17th	7
2021	Kuo Vantelin Team TOM'S	Toyota	FUJ; 7	SUZ; 6	AUT; 4‡^{2}	SUG; 7	MOT; 8	MOT; 9	SUZ; 14				10th	22
2022	Kuo Vantelin Team TOM'S	Toyota	FUJ; 5	FUJ; 3^{3}	SUZ; 18	AUT; 5^{2}	SUG; 6	FUJ; 4	MOT; 8	MOT; 14	SUZ; 5^{2}	SUZ; 3^{2}	4th	64
2023	Vantelin Team TOM’S	Toyota	FUJ; 5^{2}	FUJ; 4^{2}	SUZ; 1	AUT; 2	SUG; 1^{2}	FUJ; 3	MOT; 4	SUZ; 2‡^{2}	SUZ; 3		1st	114.5

^{‡} Half points awarded as less than 75% of race distance was completed.

=== Complete FIA World Endurance Championship results ===
(key) (Races in bold indicate pole position; races in italics indicate fastest lap)

Year	Entrant	Class	Car	Engine	1	2	3	4	5	6	7	8	Rank	Points
2023	Kessel Racing	LMGTE Am	Ferrari 488 GTE Evo	Ferrari F154CB 3.9 L Turbo V8	SEB	ALG	SPA	LMS	MNZ	FUJ; 3	BHR		20th	15
2024	Akkodis ASP Team	LMGT3	Lexus RC F GT3	Lexus 2UR-GSE 5.0 L V8	QAT	IMO	SPA; 10	LMS	SÃO	COA	FUJ	BHR	31st	1

=== Complete IMSA SportsCar Championship results ===
(key) (Races in bold indicate pole position) (Races in italics indicate fastest lap)

Year	Team	Class	Car	Engine	1	2	3	4	5	6	7	8	9	10	Rank	Points
2024	Vasser Sullivan	GTD	Lexus RC F GT3	Toyota 2UR 5.0 L V8	**DAY**; 15	SEB	LBH	LGA	WGL	MOS	ELK	VIR	IMS	PET	65th	195

=== Complete FIA Formula 2 Championship results ===
(key) (Races in bold indicate pole position) (Races in italics indicate fastest lap)

Year	Entrant	1	2	3	4	5	6	7	8	9	10	11	12	13	14	15	16	17	18	19	20	21	22	23	24	25	26	27	28	29	DC	Points
2024	Rodin Motorsport	BHR; SPR; 9	BHR; FEA; 9	JED; SPR; 12	JED; FEA; 15	MEL; SPR; 5	MEL; FEA; 5	IMO; SPR; 13	IMO; FEA; 15	MON; SPR; 17	MON; FEA; 15	CAT; SPR; 7	CAT; FEA; 13	RBR; SPR; 22	RBR; FEA; Ret	SIL; SPR; 10	SIL; FEA; 17	HUN; SPR; 12	HUN; FEA; 8	SPA; SPR; 15	SPA; FEA; 7	MNZ; SPR; 13	MNZ; FEA; 14	BAK; SPR; Ret	BAK; FEA; 13	LSL; SPR; 13	LSL; FEA; 10	YMC; SPR; 11	YMC; FEA; 10		19th	31
2025	ART Grand Prix	MEL; SPR; 12	MEL; FEA; C	BHR; SPR; 9	BHR; FEA; 14	JED; SPR; 19	JED; FEA; 16	IMO; SPR; 6	IMO; FEA; 16	MON; SPR; 10	MON; FEA; Ret	CAT; SPR; 13	CAT; FEA; 9	RBR; SPR; 8	RBR; FEA; Ret	SIL; SPR; 20	SIL; FEA; 15	SPA; SPR; 8	SPA; FEA; 2	HUN; SPR; 15	HUN; FEA; 18	MNZ; SPR; 11	MNZ; FEA; 14	BAK; SPR; 12	BAK; FEA; 10	LSL; SPR; 16	LSL; FEA; Ret	YMC; SPR; 13	YMC; FEA; 8		17th	30
2026	Hitech	MEL; SPR; 5	MEL; FEA; 5	MIA; SPR; 12	MIA; FEA; 6	MTL; SPR; 11	MTL; FEA; 16†	MON; SPR; 11	MON; FEA; 6	CAT; SPR; 14	CAT; FEA; 18	RBR; SPR; 17	RBR; FEA; 15	SIL; SPR; 11	SIL; FEA; 14	SPA; SPR; 17	SPA; FEA; 8	HUN; SPR; 13	HUN; FEA; 13	MNZ; SPR; 9	MNZ; FEA; 5	MAD; SPR; 1	MAD; FEA; 3	BAK; SPR; 19†	BAK; FEA1; Ret	BAK; FEA2; Ret	LSL; SPR	LSL; FEA	YMC; SPR	YMC; FEA	12th*	70*

* Season still in progress.

=== Complete European Le Mans Series results ===
(key) (Races in bold indicate pole position; results in italics indicate fastest lap)

Year	Entrant	Class	Chassis	Engine	1	2	3	4	5	6	Rank	Points
2024	Cool Racing	LMP2	Oreca 07	Gibson GK428 4.2 L V8	CAT; 1	LEC; Ret	IMO	SPA; 5	MUG; 9	ALG; 1	3rd	62

=== Complete 24 Hours of Le Mans results ===
Year	Team	Co-Drivers	Car	Class	Laps	Pos.	Class Pos.
2024	(Switzerland) Cool Racing	(Spain) Lorenzo Fluxá (Denmark) Malthe Jakobsen	Oreca 07-Gibson	LMP2	289	26th	12th

Sporting positions
Preceded by Sho Tsuboi	F4 Japanese Championship; Champion; 2016-2017	Succeeded by Yuki Tsunoda
Preceded by Sacha Fenestraz (Japanese Formula 3 Championship)	Super Formula Lights; Champion; 2020	Succeeded by Teppei Natori
Preceded by Tomoki Nojiri	Super Formula; Champion; 2023	Succeeded by Sho Tsuboi
Preceded by Bertrand Baguette; Kazuki Hiramine	Super GT; GT500 Champion; 2023; With: Sho Tsuboi	Succeeded by Sho Tsuboi; Kenta Yamashita
