= Zushi-Hayama Station =

Railway station in Zushi, Kanagawa Prefecture, Japan

Coordinates: 35°17′45.08″N 139°34′52.18″E

KK53 Zushi·Hayama Station 逗子・葉山駅
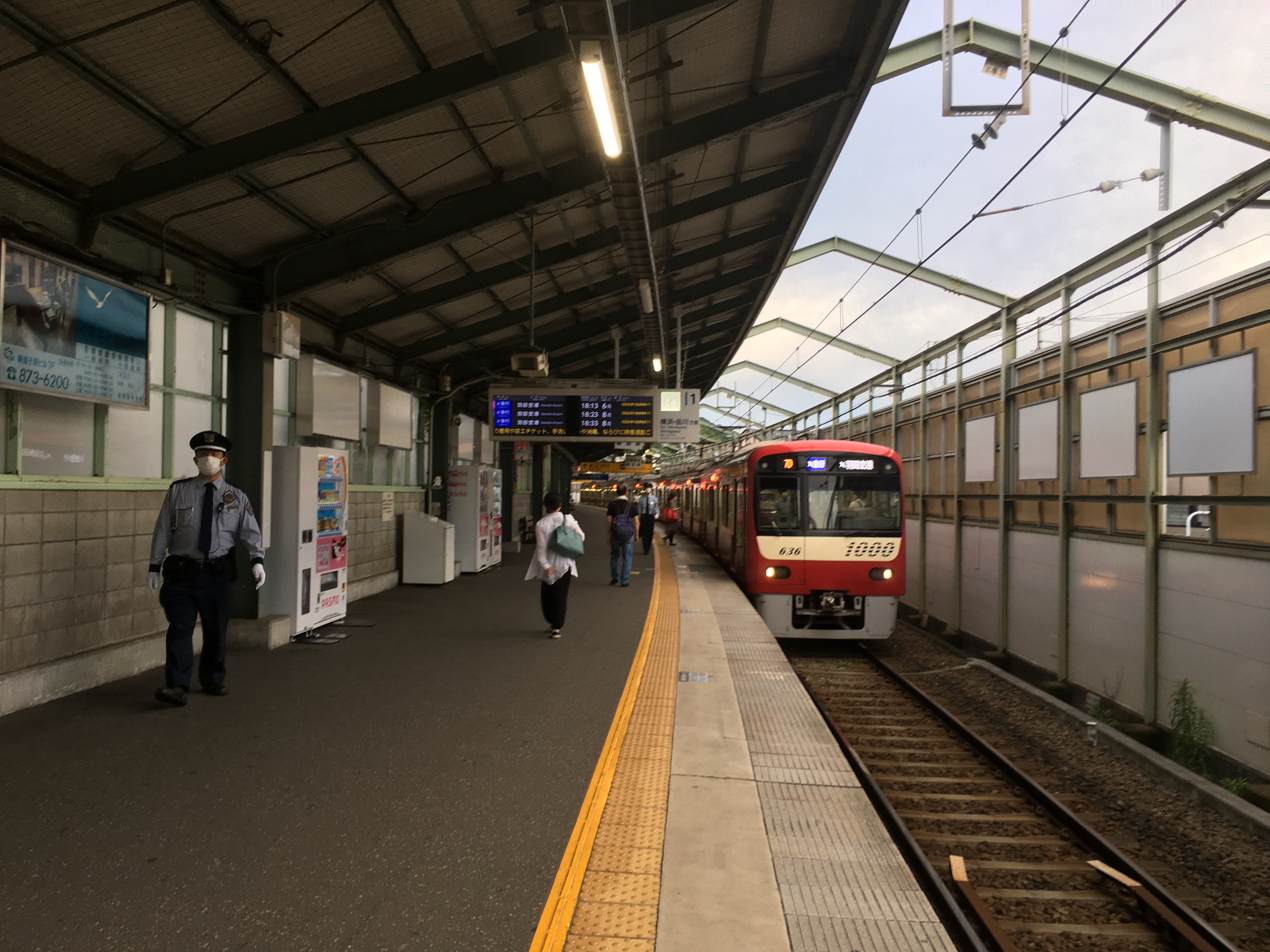
- Station platform, 2021

General information
- Location: 5-1-6 Zushi, Zushi, Kanagawa （神奈川県逗子市逗子五丁目） Japan
- Operator: Keikyu
- Line: Keikyu Zushi Line
- Connections: Bus stop

Other information
- Station code: KK53

History
- Opened: 1985
- Former names: Shinzushi Station (until 13 March 2020)

Passengers
- FY2011: 22,990 daily

Services
Preceding station	Keikyu	Following station
Terminus	Zushi Line Limited Express (Tokkyū) Express Local	Jimmuji KK52 towards Kanazawa-hakkei
Location

Zushi-Hayama Station (逗子・葉山駅, Zushi-Hayama-eki) is a railway station on the Keikyu Zushi Line in Zushi, Kanagawa, Japan, operated by the private railway operator Keikyu. This station comes last in an alphabetical list of Japanese railway stations (Abashiri Station in Hokkaido is first).

== Lines ==
Zushi-Hayama Station is the southern terminus of the Keikyu Zushi Line, and is located 5.9 km from the junction at Kanazawa-hakkei Station, and 46.8 km from Shinagawa Station in Tokyo.

== Station layout ==
Zushi-Hayama Station has a single side platform serving bi-directional traffic.

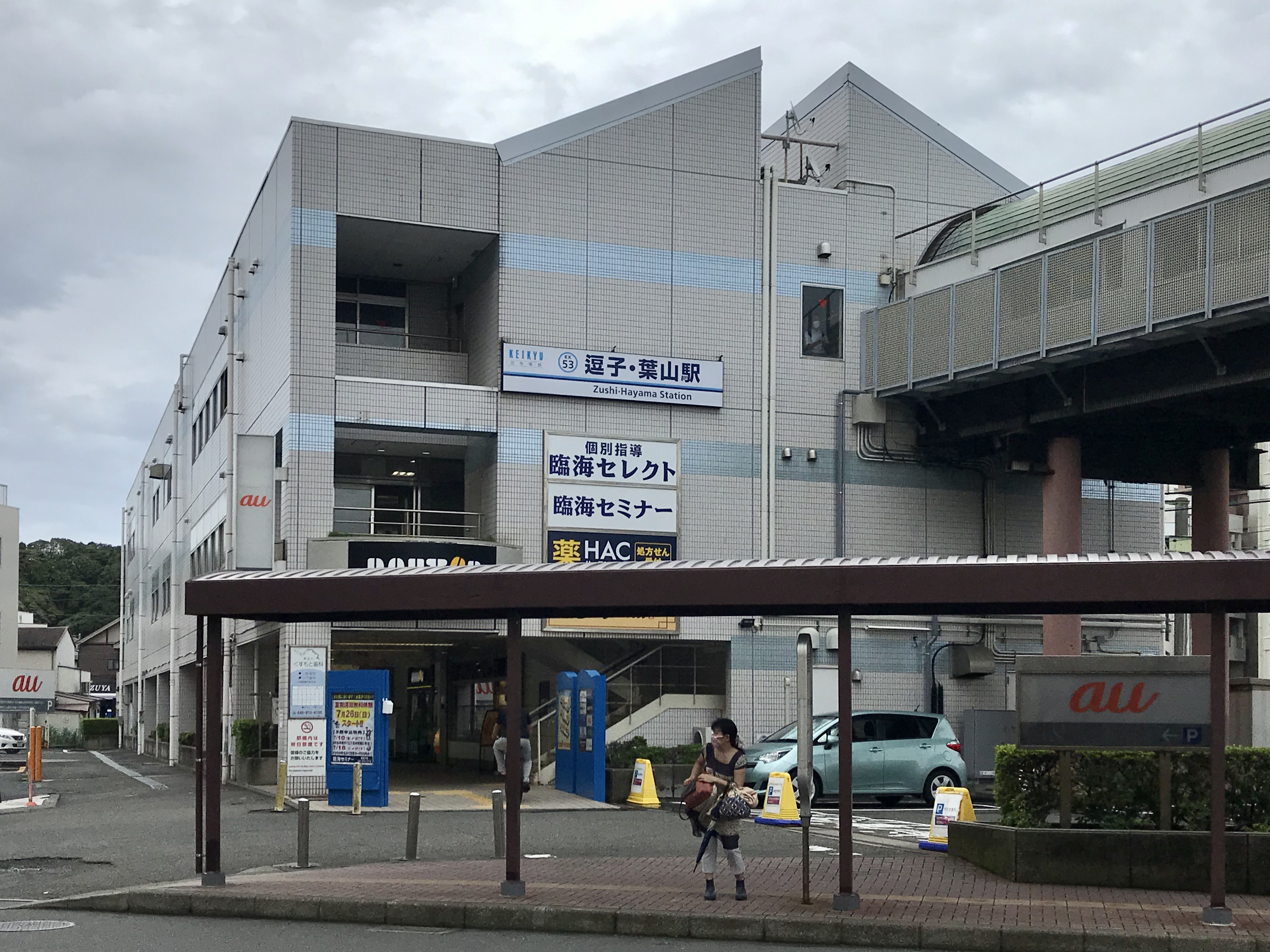
The north entrance, July 2020

=== Platforms ===
-	■ Keikyu Zushi Line	for Yokohama, Haneda Airport, Shinagawa, and Oshiage

== History ==
Zushi-Hayama Station opened on 2 February 1985.

Zushi-Hayama Station was renamed from Shinzushi Station (新逗子駅, Shinzushi-eki) on 14 March 2020. The name was changed to reflect the station's location near Hayama, a popular commuter and seaside resort town.

Keikyū introduced station numbering to its stations on 21 October 2010; Zushi-Hayama Station was assigned station number KK53.

== Passenger statistics ==
In fiscal 2011, the station was used by an average of 22,990 passengers daily.

== Surrounding area ==
- Zushi Station (JR East Yokosuka Line)
- Zushi City Office
- Zushi Kaisei Junior & Senior High School
- Seimaria Primary School
