= 10000 series =

10000 series may refer to:

== Japanese train types ==
- Keihan 10000 series EMU, operated by Keihan Electric Railway
- Kintetsu 10000 series EMU
- Nankai 10000 series EMU
- Odakyu 10000 series HiSE EMU
- Seibu 10000 series EMU
- Sotetsu 10000 series EMU
- Tobu 10000 series EMU
- Toei 10-000 series EMU
- Tokyo Metro 10000 series EMU
- Tokyo Monorail 10000 series EMU
- Yokohama Municipal Subway 10000 series EMU
