= Tokyo Monorail 10000 series =

Japanese train type

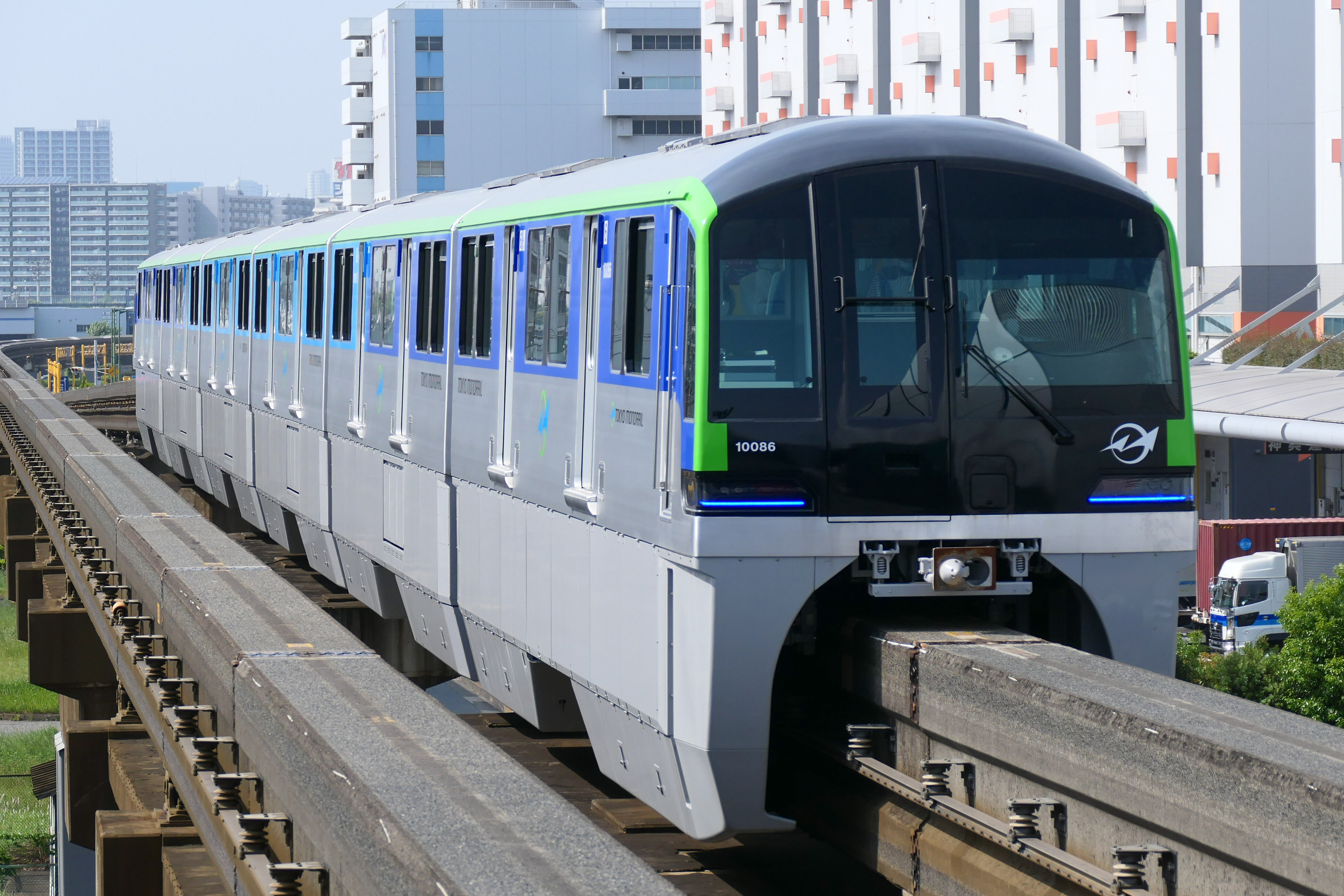
- Set 10081 in May 2021

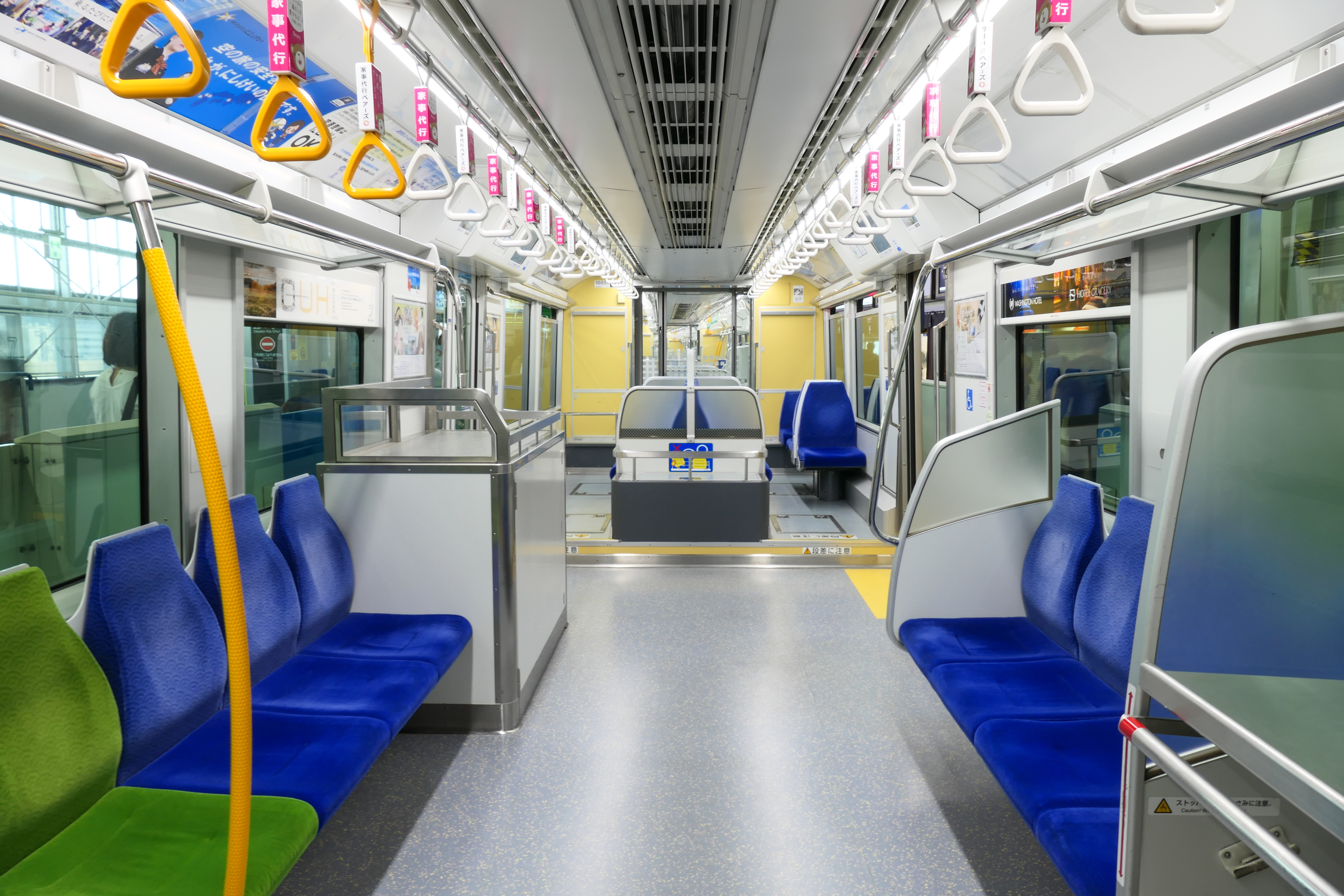
- In service: July 18, 2014 – Present
- Manufacturer: Hitachi Rail
- Built at: Yamaguchi
- Family name: Hitachi Monorail
- Replaced: 1000 series
- Constructed: 2014–
- Number built: 48 vehicles (8 sets)
- Number in service: 48 vehicles (8 sets)
- Formation: 6 cars per trainset
- Fleet numbers: 10011–10081
- Operators: Tokyo Monorail
- Depots: Showajima
- Lines served: Tokyo Monorail Haneda Airport Line

Specifications
- Car body construction: Aluminium alloy
- Car length: 16.4 m (53 ft 10 in) (Tc); 15.2 m (49 ft 10 in) (M)
- Width: 3,038 mm (9 ft 11.6 in)
- Height: 4,364 mm (14 ft 3.8 in)
- Doors: 2 pairs per side
- Maximum speed: 80 km/h (50 mph)
- Traction system: Hitachi VFI-HR4810B 2-level IGBT–VVVF
- Traction motors: 16 × Hitachi HS37627-03RB 100 kW (134 hp) asynchronous 3-phase AC
- Power output: 1.6 MW (2,146 hp)
- Acceleration: 3.5 km/(h⋅s) (2.2 mph/s)
- Deceleration: 4 km/(h⋅s) (2.5 mph/s) (service); 4.5 km/(h⋅s) (2.8 mph/s) (emergency)
- Electric system(s): 750 V DC
- Current collection: Side contact
- UIC classification: 2′2′+Bo′Bo′+Bo′Bo′+Bo′Bo′+Bo′Bo′+2′2′
- Safety system(s): ATC
- Track gauge: (straddle-beam monorail)

The Tokyo Monorail 10000 series (東京モノレール10000形, Tōkyō Monorēru 10000-gata) is a monorail electric multiple unit (EMU) train type operated by the Tokyo Monorail on the Tokyo Monorail Haneda Airport Line in Japan since July 2014.

== Design ==
The body design is based on the earlier 2000 series trains first built in 1997, and uses friction stir welded (FSW) aluminum alloy panels.

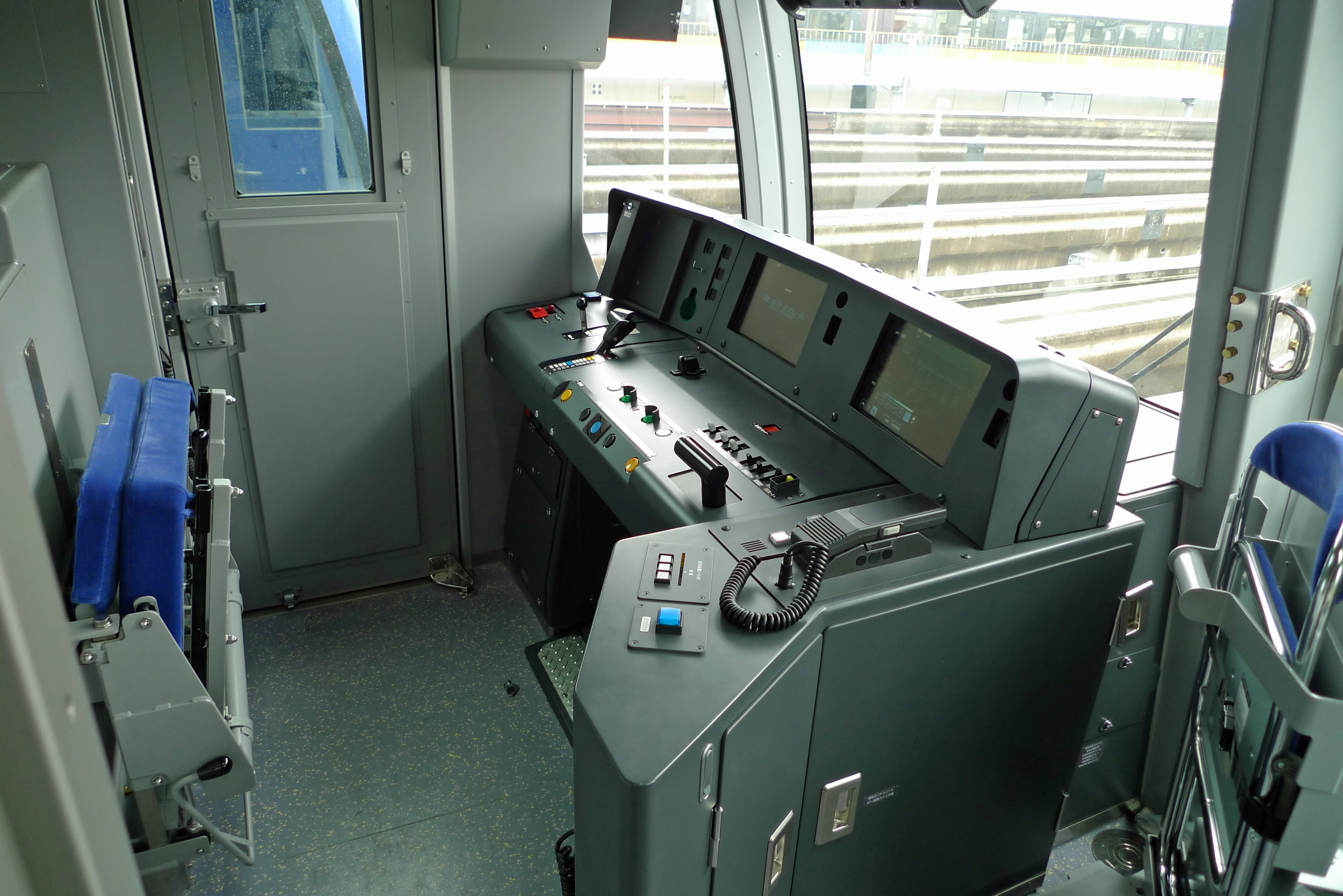
The interior of the driving cab

== Formation ==
As of 1 April 2021, the fleet consists of eight six-car sets, numbered 10011 to 10081, and formed as shown below, with four motored ("M") cars and two non-powered trailer ("T") cars. Car 1 is at the Hamamatsucho end.

Car No.	1	2	3	4	5	6
Designation	Tc1	M1	M2	M3	M4	Tc2
Numbering	100x1	100x2	100x3	100x4	100x5	100x6
Weight (t)	23.3	23.7	24.1	23.8	24.0	23.0
Capacity (seated/total)	33/76	40/76				33/76

- "x" stands for the set number.
- Cars 1 and 6 each have a wheelchair space.

== Interior ==
Passenger accommodation consists of a mixture of facing 4-seat bays and longitudinal bench seating, and includes baggage racks next to the doorways. The seats are covered in a blue moquette incorporating the traditional Japanese seigaiha (青海波) pattern. LED lighting is used throughout. Passenger information is provided by 7-inch (178 mm) wide LCD displays above the doorways. Information is provided in four languages: Japanese, English, Chinese, and Korean. Initially one screen is provided above each doorway, but provision is made for installing a second screen in the future.

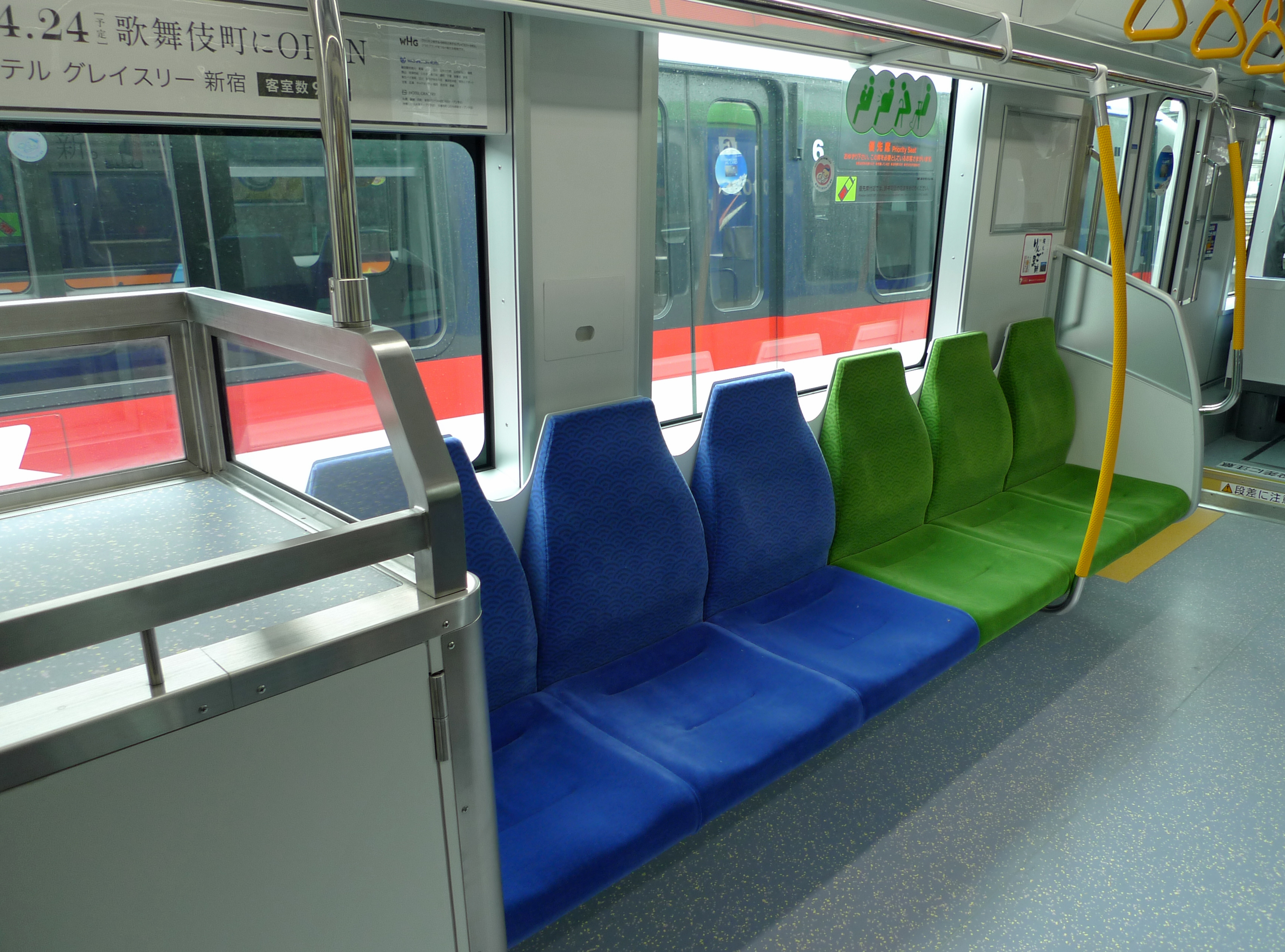
Longitudinal seating

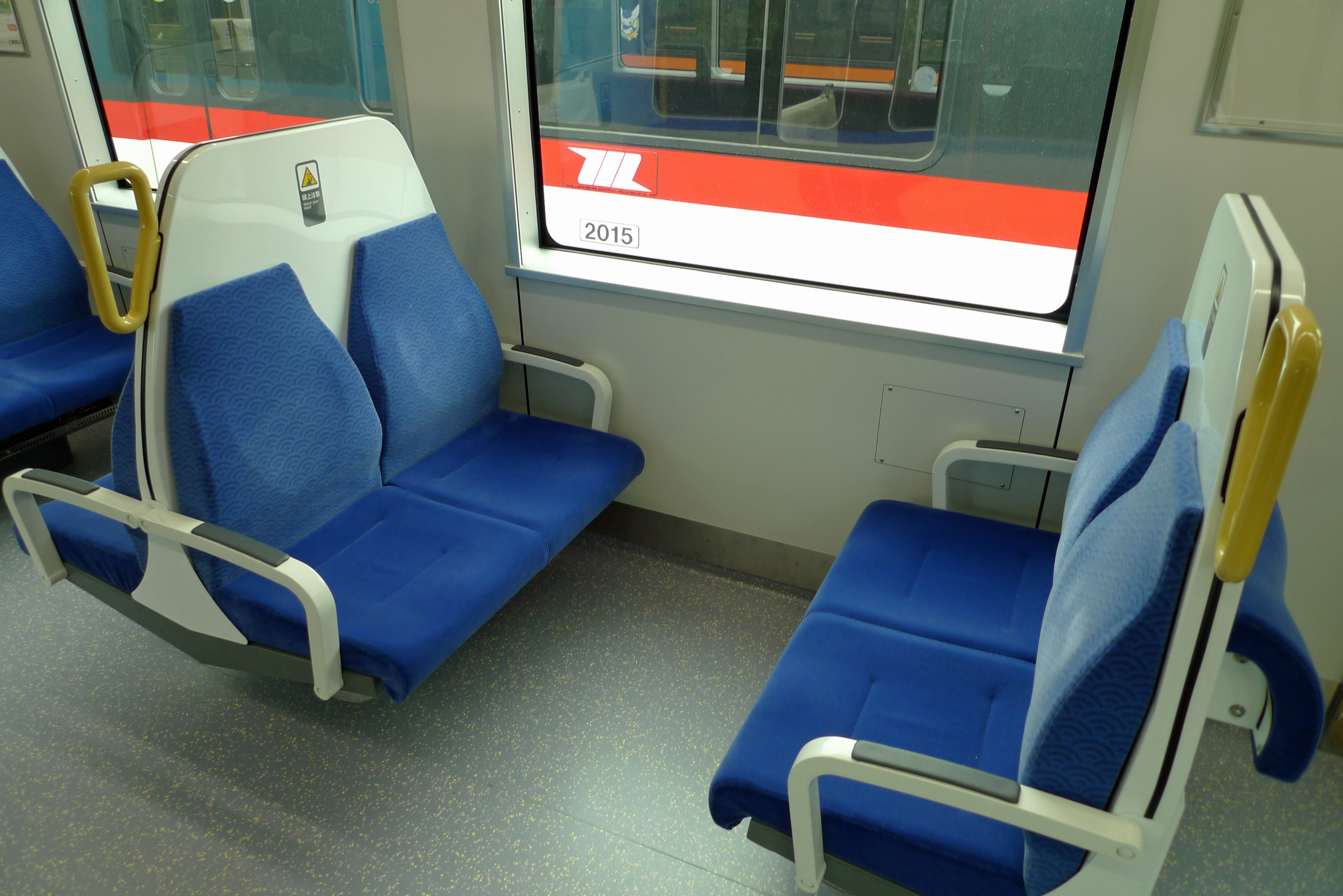
Facing 4-seat bays

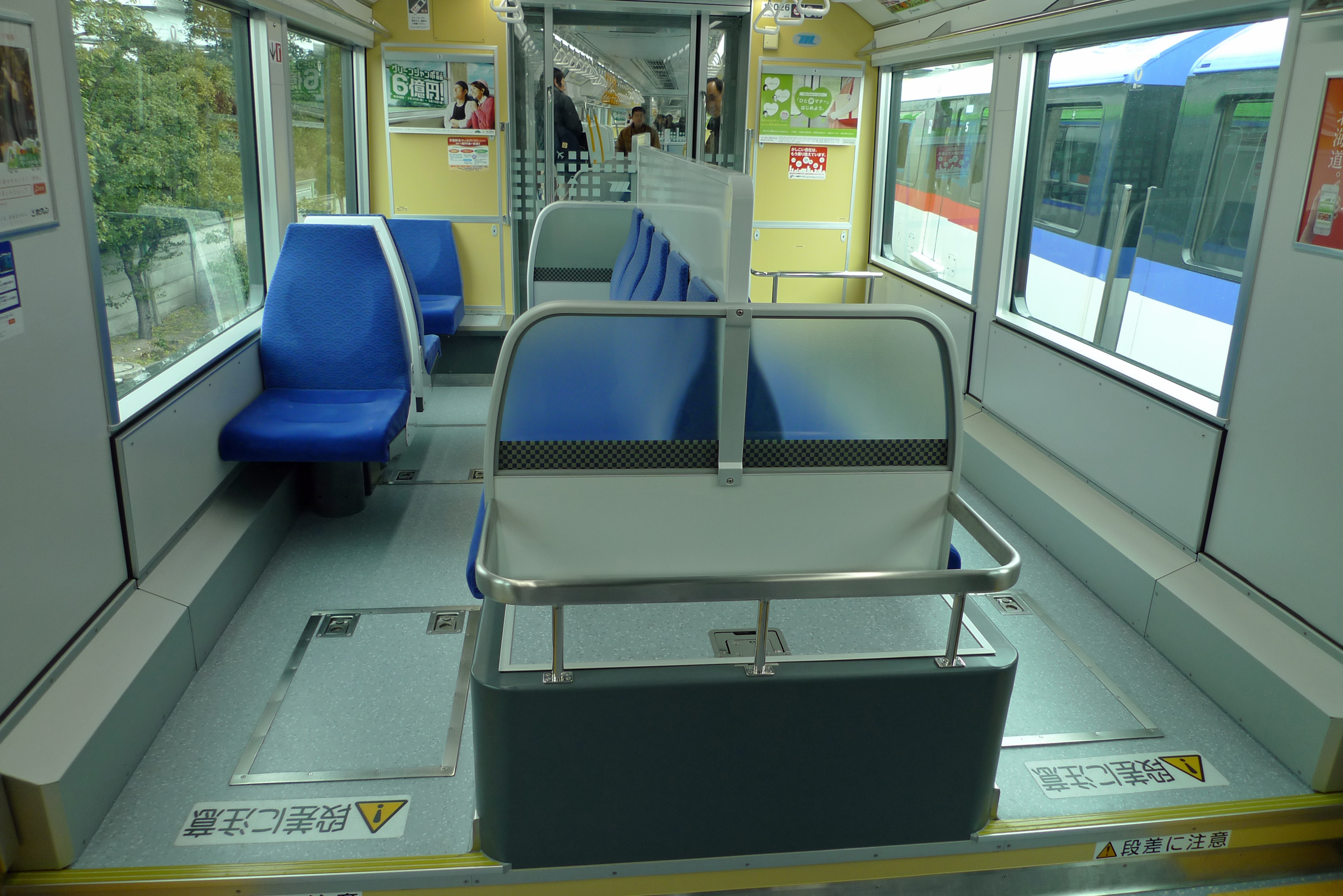
Seating over the train bogies

== History ==
This vehicle was introduced to replace the aging 1000 series.

The first set, 10011, was delivered to Tokyo Monorail's Showajima Depot in March 2014. It entered revenue service on 18 July 2014.

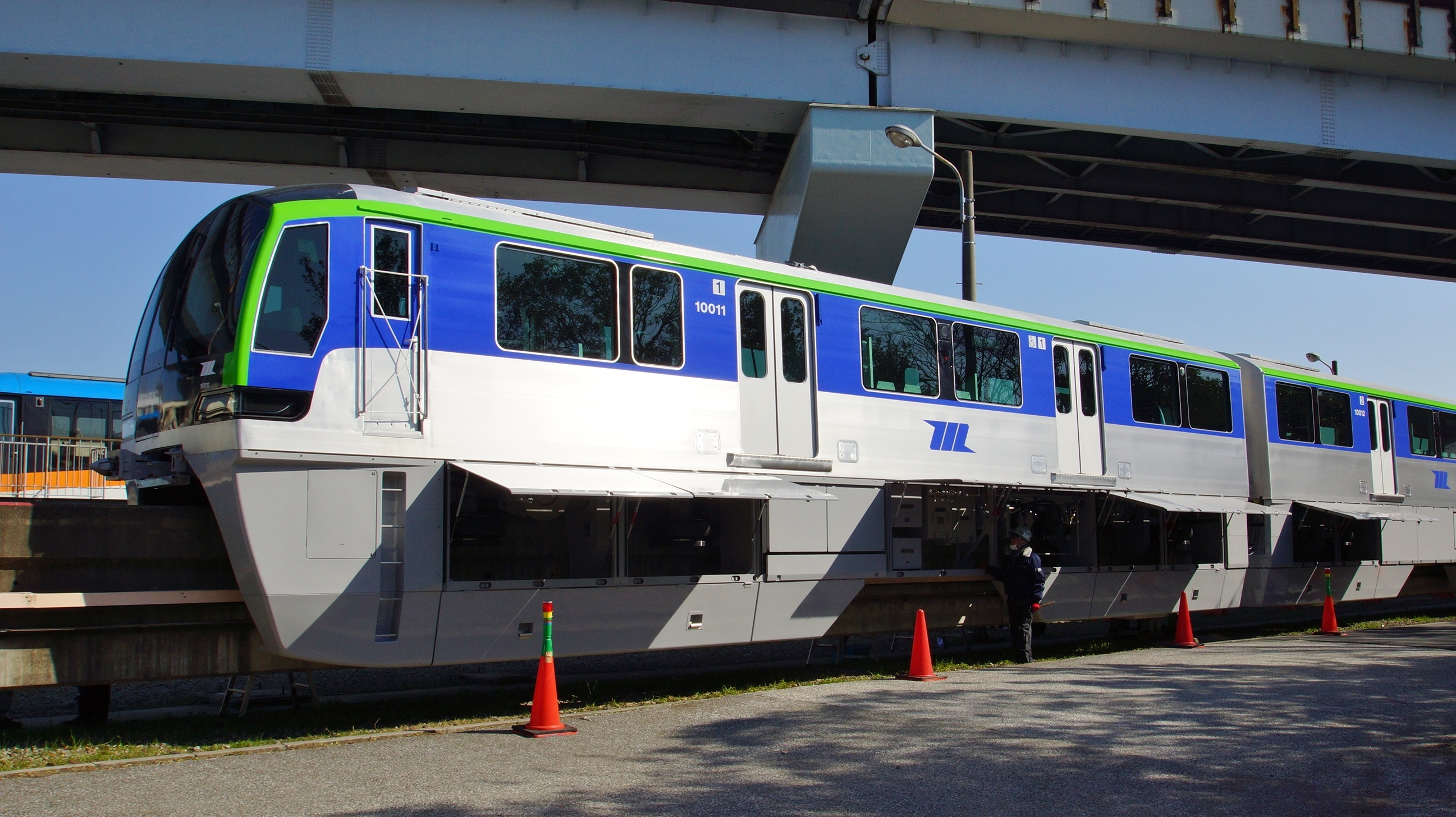
The first set delivered, 10011, at Showajima Depot in March 2014

=== Structural damage ===
On 31 May 2022, structural cracks were discovered on seven 10000 series trainsets, causing a reduction in peak-hour service from every four minutes to every five minutes. The cracks were mainly found on an aluminum part which connects the body of the vehicle to the bogie.
