= Ōi Keibajō Mae Station =

Monorail station in Tokyo, Japan

MO03 Ōi Keibajō Mae Station 大井競馬場前駅
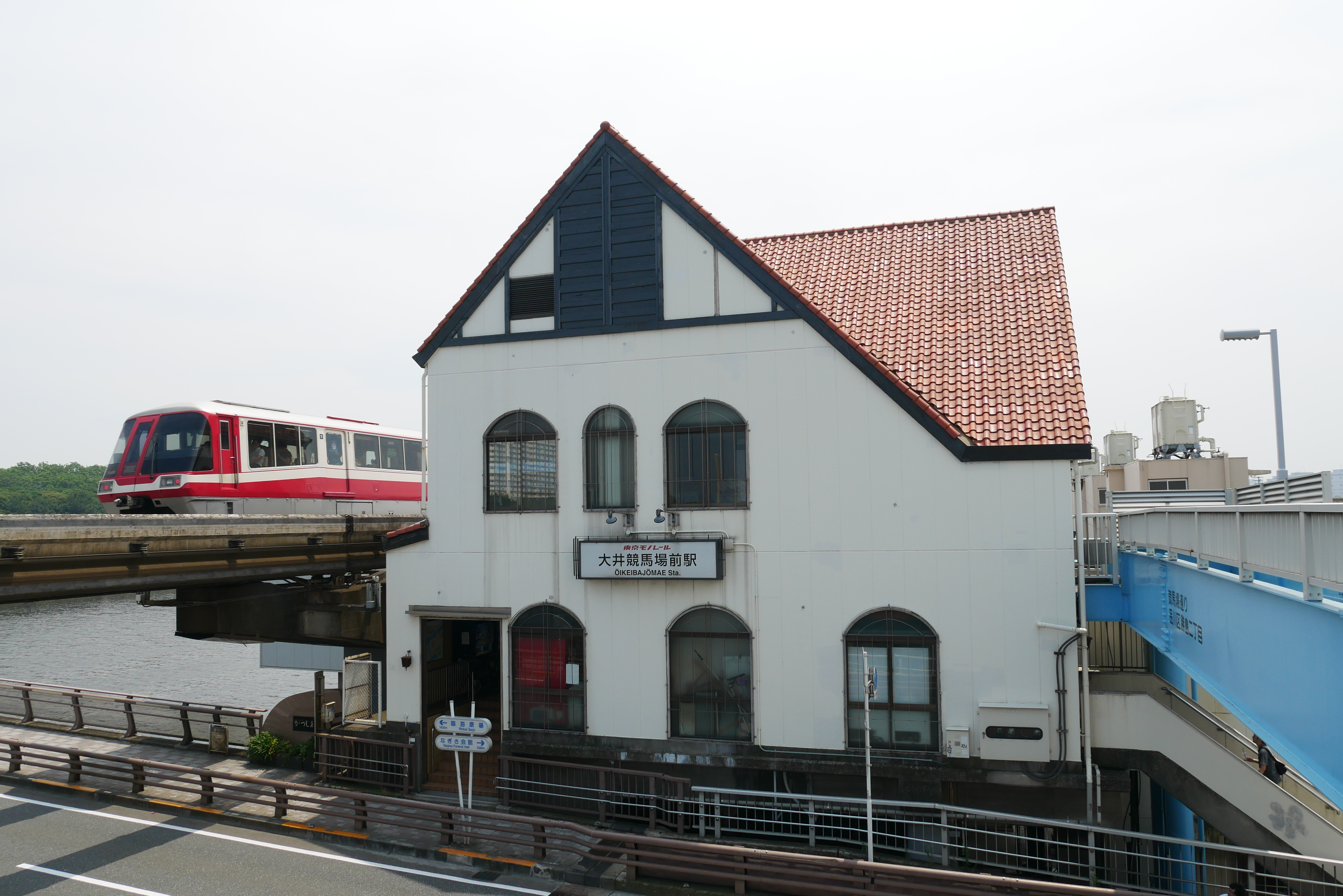
- The station building and train, 2018

General information
- Location: 2-2-35 Katsushima; Shinagawa-ku, Tokyo; Japan
- Coordinates: 35.595°N 139.7471°E
- Operator: Tokyo Monorail
- Distance: 7.1 km (4.4 mi) from Monorail Hamamatsuchō
- Platforms: 2 side platforms
- Tracks: 2

Construction
- Structure type: Elevated

Other information
- Station code: MO-03
- Website: Official website

History
- Opened: 27 May 1965
- Rebuilt: 1967

Passengers
- FY2011: 8,537 daily

Services
Preceding station	Tokyo Monorail	Following station
Tennōzu Isle MO02 towards Monorail Hamamatsuchō	Haneda Airport Line Rapid Local	Ryūtsū Center MO04 towards Haneda Airport Terminal 2
Location
- Location within Special wards of Tokyo Location within Tokyo Location within Japan

Ōi Keibajō Mae Station (Japanese: 大井競馬場前駅, Hepburn: Ōi Keibajō-mae-eki; lit. 'In front of Ohi Racecourse station') is a station on the Tokyo Monorail in Shinagawa, Tokyo, Japan.

== Lines ==
Ōi Keibajō Mae Station is served by the Tokyo Monorail Haneda Airport Line between Monorail Hamamatsuchō station in central Tokyo and Haneda Airport Terminal 2 station, and lies 7.1 kilometres (4.4 mi) from the northern terminus of the line at Hamamatsuchō.

== History ==
Ōi Keibajō Mae Station opened on 27 May 1965 as the first of several infill stations on the monorail line. However, because land reclamation had not yet reached the beamway, the station was built as a temporary platform suspended above the water and used only on event days at Ohi Racecourse. It was replaced by a permanent structure two years later, and the reclaimed land around it was eventually developed into the Yashio Park Town housing complex.

== Passenger statistics ==
In fiscal 2011, the station was used by an average of 8,537 passengers daily.

== Surrounding area ==
The station is located next to the Ōi Racecourse (after which it is named), and is also used by commuters from the nearby Yashio housing development.
