= Seibijō Station =

Monorail station in Tokyo, Japan

Coordinates: 35.5554°N 139.7534°E

MO06 Seibijō Station 整備場駅
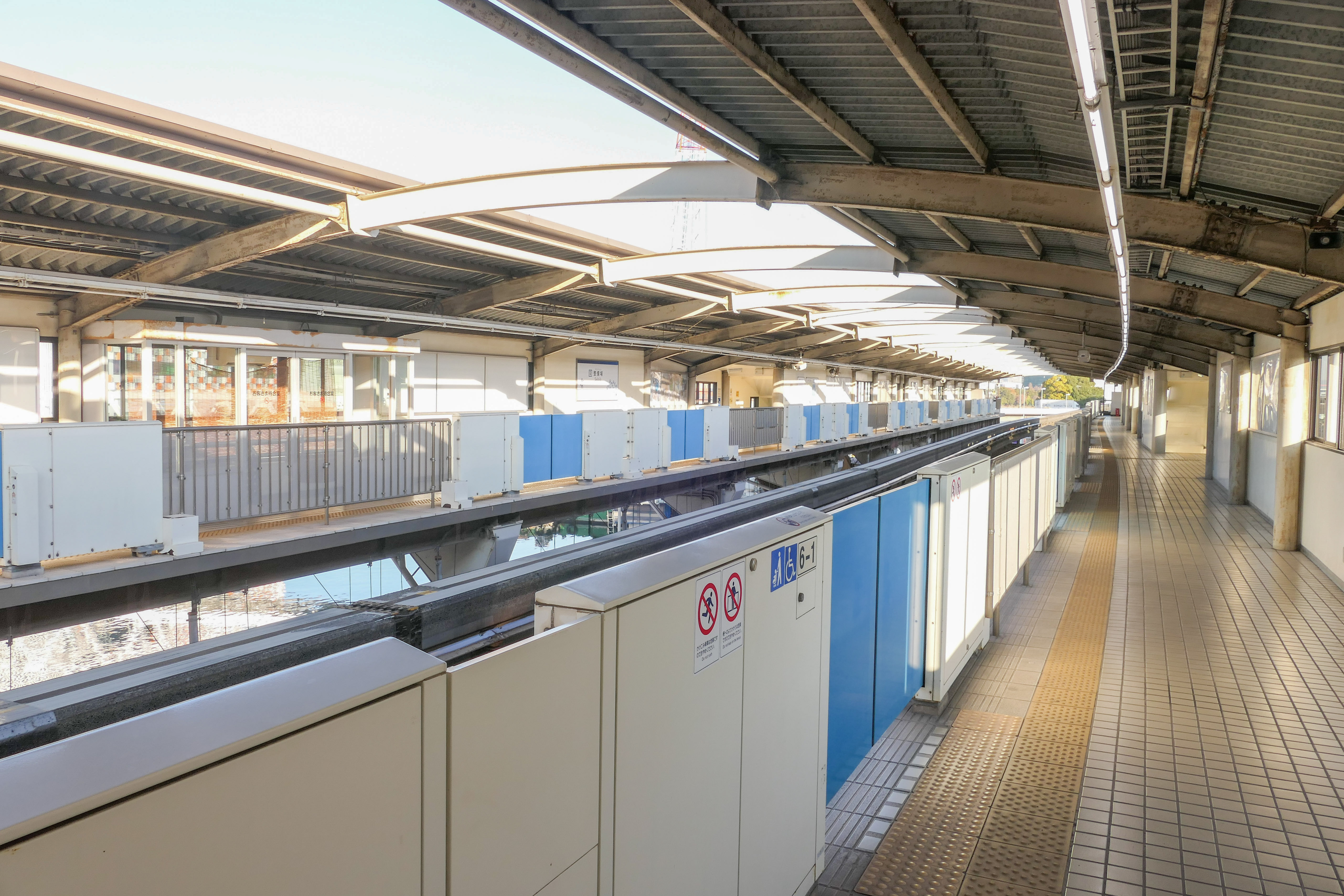
- Platform, December 2024

General information
- Location: 1-7-4 Haneda Kūkō; Ōta, Tokyo; Japan
- Operator: Tokyo Monorail
- Platforms: 2 side platforms
- Tracks: 2

Construction
- Structure type: Elevated

Other information
- Station code: MO-06

History
- Opened: 20 March 1967
- Former names: Haneda Seibijō (until 1993)

Passengers
- FY2011: 2,329 daily

Services
Preceding station	Tokyo Monorail	Following station
Shōwajima MO05 towards Monorail Hamamatsuchō	Haneda Airport Line Local	Tenkūbashi MO07 towards Haneda Airport Terminal 2
Location
- Location within Special wards of Tokyo Location within Tokyo Location within Japan

Seibijō Station (Japanese: 整備場駅, Hepburn: Seibijō-eki, lit. "Maintenance facility Station") is a station on the Tokyo Monorail in Ōta, Tokyo, Japan. The station is named after the nearby maintenance facilities of Haneda Airport.

== Lines ==
Seibijō Station is served by the Tokyo Monorail Haneda Airport Line between Monorail Hamamatsuchō station in central Tokyo and Haneda Airport Terminal 2 station, and lies 11.8 kilometres (7.3 mi) from the northern terminus of the line at Hamamatsuchō. Only all-stations "Local" services stop at this station.

== Station layout ==
The station has two elevated platforms serving two tracks. Both platforms are connected by stairways with ticket gates on the street level.

== History ==
The station opened on 20 March 1967 as Haneda Seibijō Station (羽田整備場駅). It was renamed simply Seibijō Station on 27 September 1993.

== Passenger statistics ==
In fiscal 2011, the station was used by an average of 2,329 passengers daily.
