= Tokyo Monorail 2000 series =

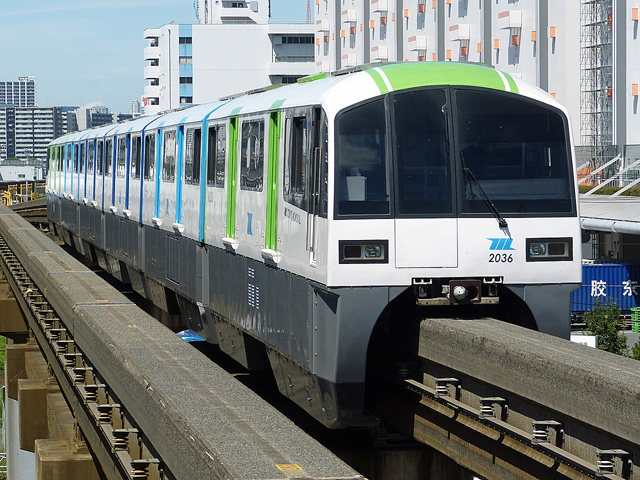
- Refurbished and reliveried set 2031 in September 2016

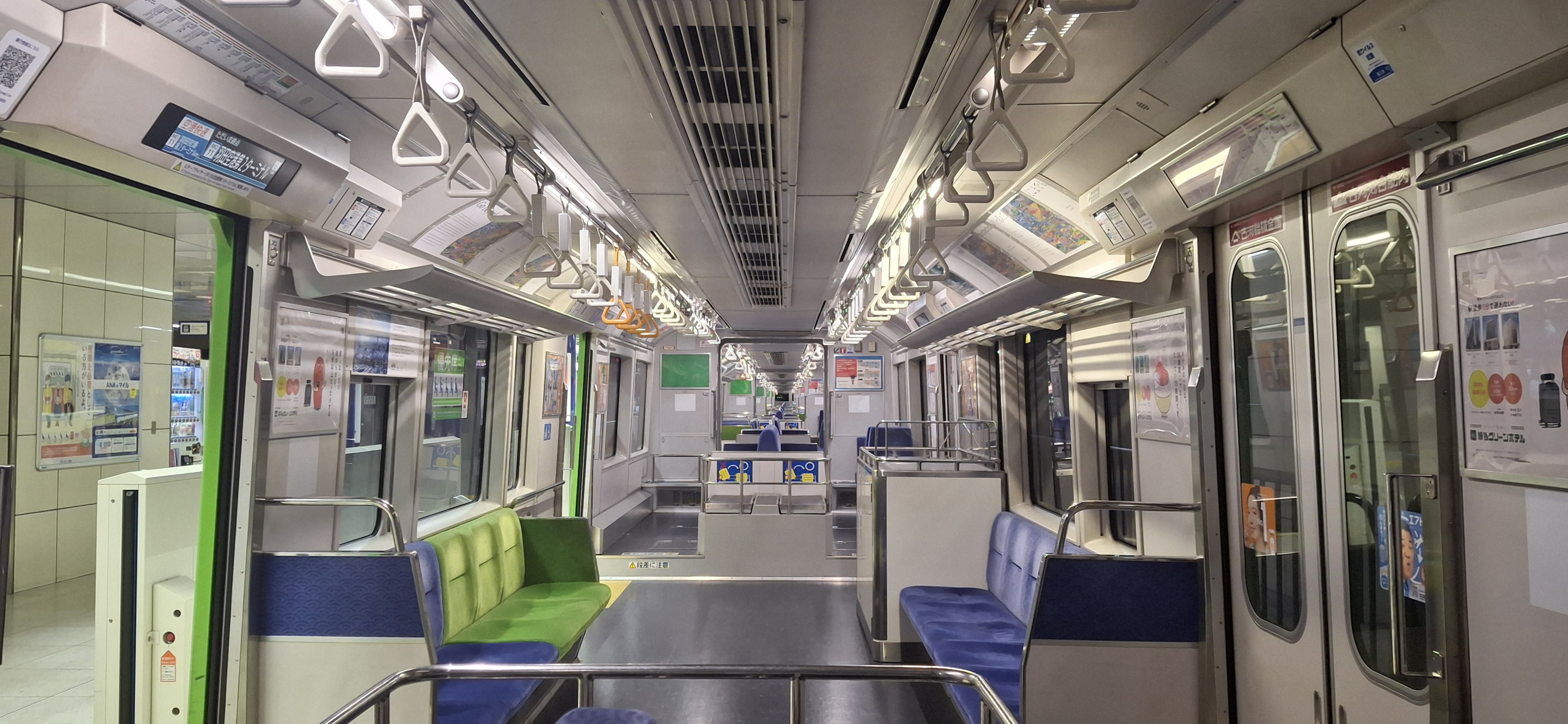
- Manufacturer: Hitachi
- Family name: Hitachi Monorail
- Replaced: 700/800 series
- Constructed: 1997–2002
- Entered service: 1997
- Number built: 24 vehicles (4 sets)
- Number in service: 24 vehicles (4 sets)
- Formation: 6 cars per trainset
- Fleet numbers: 2011–2041
- Capacity: 600
- Operator: Tokyo Monorail
- Depot: Showajima

Specifications
- Car body construction: Aluminium alloy
- Car length: 16.4 m (53 ft 10 in) (end cars); 15.2 m (49 ft 10 in) (intermediate cars)
- Width: 3,038 mm (9 ft 11.6 in)
- Height: 4,364 mm (14 ft 3.8 in)
- Doors: 2 pairs per side
- Maximum speed: 80 km/h (50 mph)
- Traction system: IGBT–VVVF (Hitachi)
- Traction motors: 16 × 100 kW (134 hp) 3-phase AC induction motor (Hitachi)
- Power output: 1.6 MW (2,146 hp)
- Acceleration: 0.97 m/s^{2} (2.2 mph/s)
- Deceleration: 1.1 m/s^{2} (2.5 mph/s) (service); 1.3 m/s^{2} (2.9 mph/s) (emergency)
- Electric system: 750 V DC
- Current collection: Side contact
- Safety system: ATC
- Track gauge: (straddle-beam monorail)

The Tokyo Monorail 2000 series (東京モノレール2000形, Tōkyō Monorēru 2000-gata) is a monorail electric multiple unit (EMU) train type operated by the Tokyo Monorail on the Tokyo Monorail Haneda Airport Line in Japan since 1997.

== Overview ==
The 2000 series trains were introduced from 1997 to replace the ageing 700 series and 800 series trains dating from 1982 and to provide increased capacity with the opening of Terminal 2 at Haneda Airport. These trains were the first monorail trains in Japan to use VVVF control.

== Formation ==
The fleet consists of four six-car sets (numbered 2011 to 2041) as shown below, with four motored ("M") cars and two non-powered trailer ("T") cars. Car 1 is at the Hamamatsucho end.

Car No.	1	2	3	4	5	6
Designation	Tc1	M1	M2	M3	M4	Tc2
Numbering	20x1	20x2	20x3	20x4	20x5	20x6

- "x" stands for the set number.

== Interior ==
Passenger accommodation consists of a mixture of facing four-seat bays and longitudinal bench seats. There are also dedicated luggage areas for large luggage in each car. Cars 1 and 6 have wheelchair spaces.

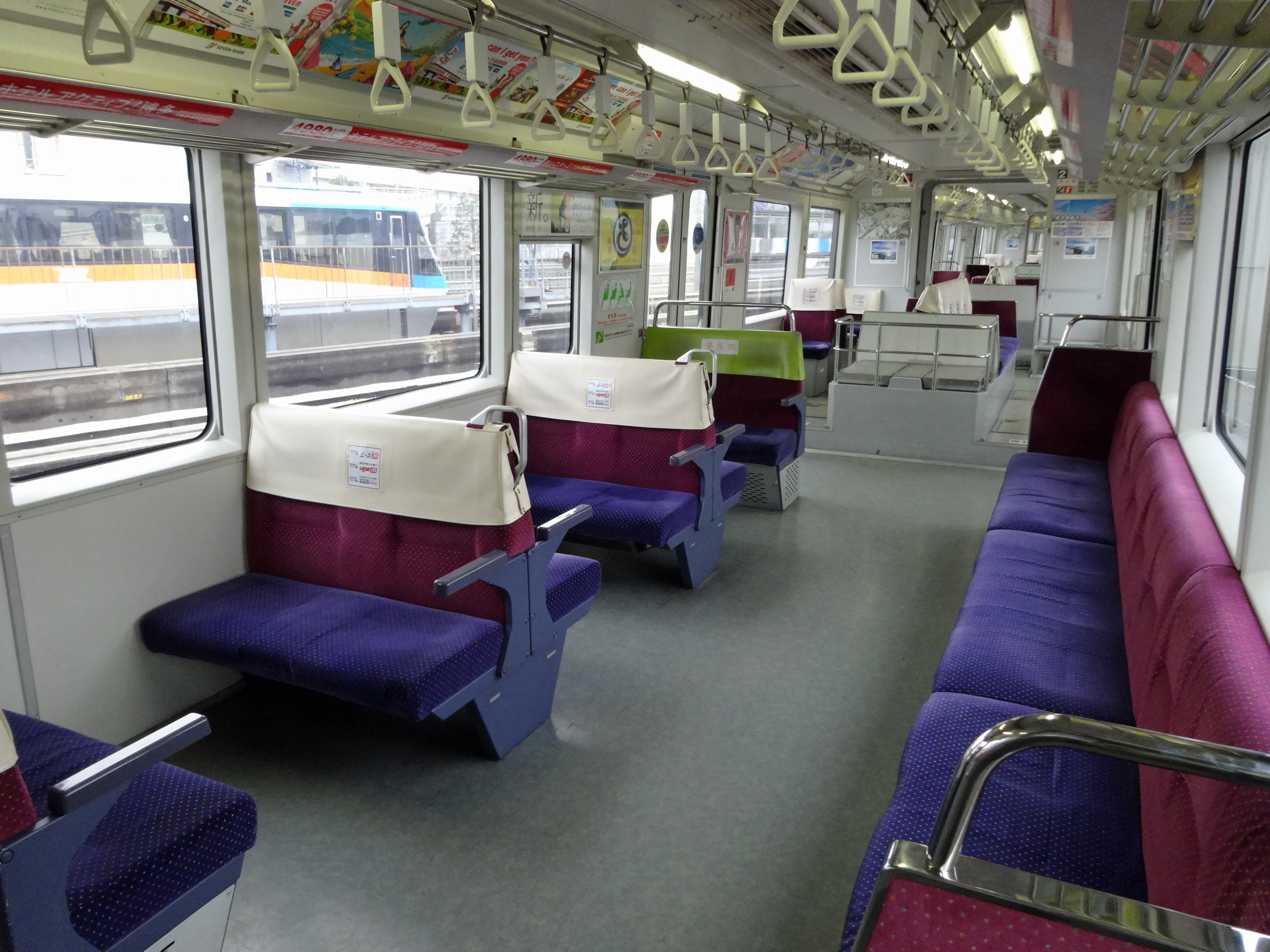
The interior of a 2000 series set in February 2015

== History ==
The fleet of four sets was delivered between 1997 and 2002 in three batches: batch 24 (set 2011), batch 25 (sets 2021 and 2031), and batch 26 (set 2041). The first set, set 2011, was delivered on 31 July 1997, with the last set, set 2041, delivered by 23 April 2002.

Originally delivered in a livery of black with cobalt blue, red and white, the 2000 series trains were repainted into a new livery of white with lime green, light blue and navy blue from 2015 to 2018.

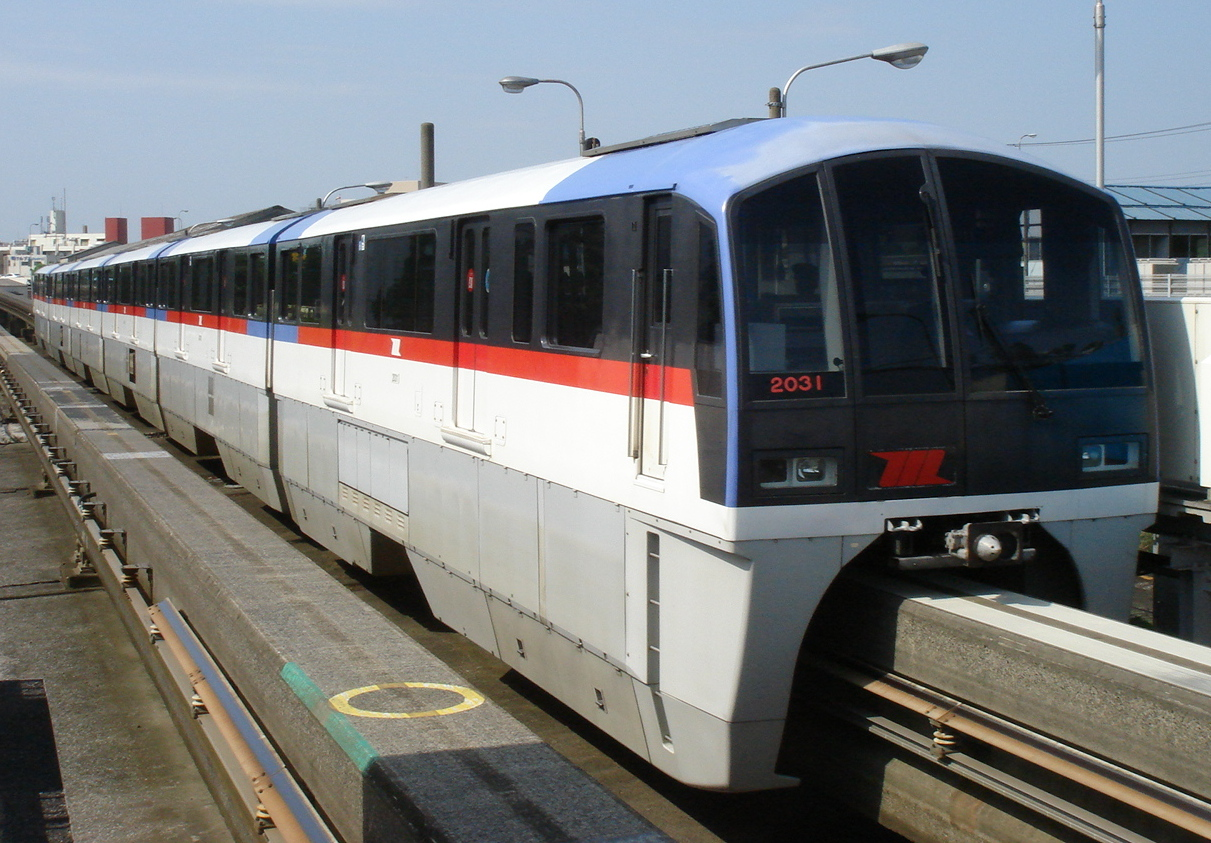
Set 2031 in original livery in May 2006

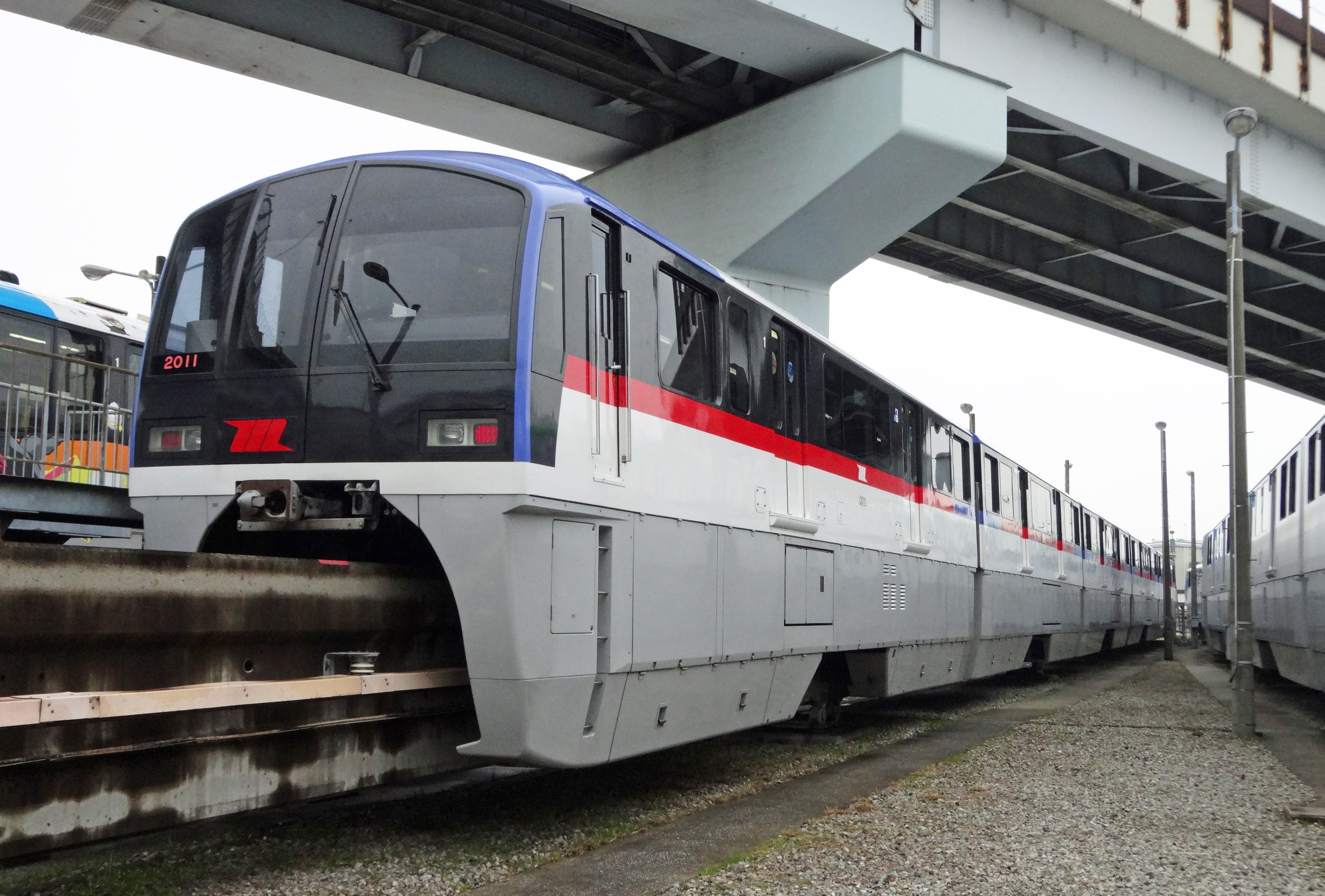
Set 2011 in original livery in February 2015

== Awards ==
The 2000 series trains received the Japanese Good Design Award in 1997.
