= Ryūtsū Center Station =

Monorail station in Tokyo, Japan

Coordinates: 35.5818°N 139.7491°E

MO04 Ryūtsū Center Station 流通センター駅
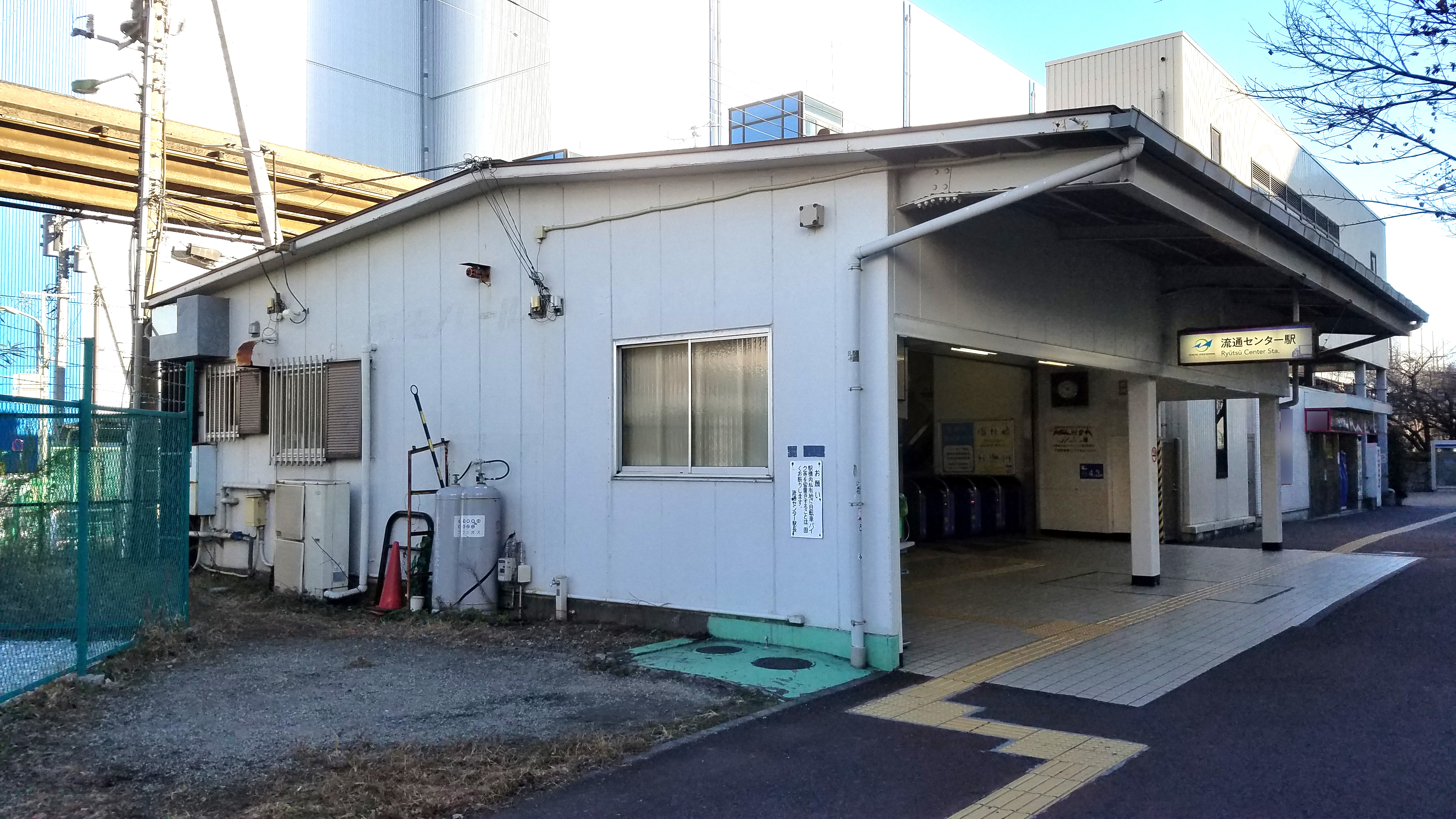
- The station building in January 2022

General information
- Location: 6-1-2 Heiwajima; Ōta, Tokyo; Japan
- Operator: Tokyo Monorail
- Distance: 8.7 km (5.4 mi) from Monorail Hamamatsuchō
- Platforms: 2 side platforms
- Tracks: 2

Construction
- Structure type: Elevated

Other information
- Station code: MO-04

History
- Opened: 15 December 1969
- Former names: Shin-Heiwajima (until 1972)

Passengers
- FY2011: 15,948 daily

Services
Preceding station	Tokyo Monorail	Following station
Ōi Keibajō Mae MO03 towards Monorail Hamamatsuchō	Haneda Airport Line Rapid	Haneda Airport Terminal 3 MO08 towards Haneda Airport Terminal 2
Ōi Keibajō Mae MO03 towards Monorail Hamamatsuchō	Haneda Airport Line Local	Shōwajima MO05 towards Haneda Airport Terminal 2
Location
- Location within Special wards of Tokyo Location within Tokyo Location within Japan

Ryūtsū Center Station (Japanese: 流通センター駅, Hepburn: Ryūtsū Sentā-eki; lit. 'Logistics Center Station') is a station on the Tokyo Monorail in Ōta, Tokyo, Japan. Its name comes from its location near various warehousing and forwarding facilities, including Tokyo's primary rail freight terminal, Tokyo Freight Terminal.

== Lines ==
Ryūtsū Center Station is served by the Tokyo Monorail Haneda Airport Line between Monorail Hamamatsuchō station in central Tokyo and Haneda Airport Terminal 2 station, and lies 8.7 kilometres (5.4 mi) from the northern terminus of the line at Hamamatsuchō.

== History ==
The station opened on 15 December 1969 as Shin-Heiwajima Station (新平和島駅; lit. 'New Heiwajima Station'). It gained its current name in January 1972 (originally transliterated as Ryūtsū Sentā, but changed in 1992). Rapid services began stopping here on 18 March 2007.

== Passenger statistics ==
In fiscal 2011, the station was used by an average of 15,948 passengers daily.

== Surrounding area ==
- Tokyo Ryutsu Center (TRC)
- Heiwajima Park
