= Tokyo Monorail =

Monorail line in Tokyo, Japan

Tokyo Monorail Haneda Airport Line (Tokyo Panorama Line)

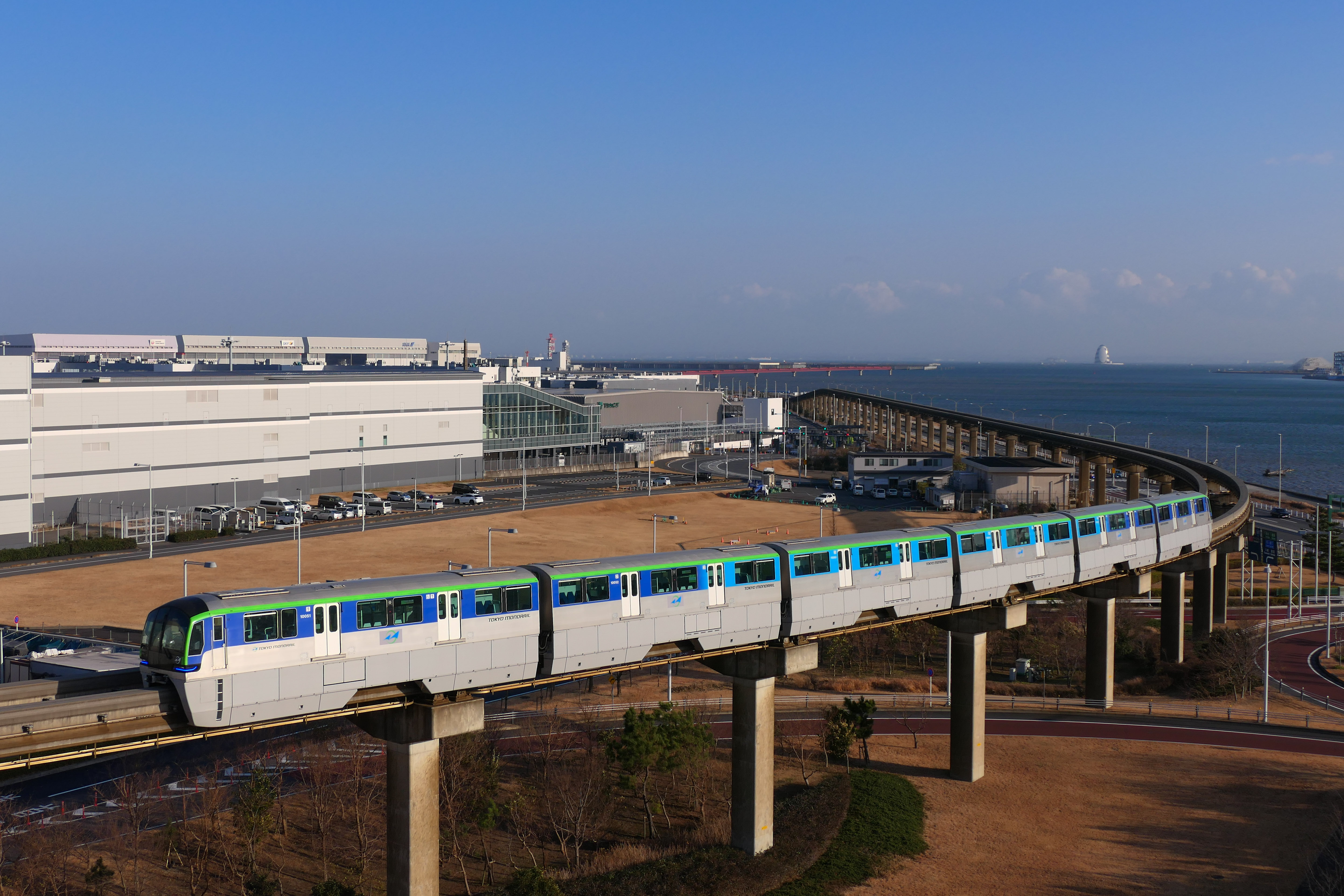
- A train passing through Haneda Airport

Overview
- Native name: 東京モノレール羽田空港線
- Owner: Tokyo Monorail Co., Ltd.
- Locale: Tokyo, Japan
- Termini: Monorail Hamamatsuchō (north); Haneda Airport Terminal 2 (south)
- Stations: 11
- Website: www.tokyo-monorail.co.jp/english

Service
- Type: Straddle-beam monorail (Alweg‑type)
- Daily ridership: 107,871 (JFY23)

History
- Opened: 17 September 1964; 62 years ago

Technical
- Line length: 17.8 km (11.1 mi)
- Character: Elevated and underground
- Minimum radius: 120 m (390 ft)
- Electrification: Contact rails, 750 V DC
- Operating speed: Avg.: 45 km/h (28 mph); Top: 80 km/h (50 mph)
Route map
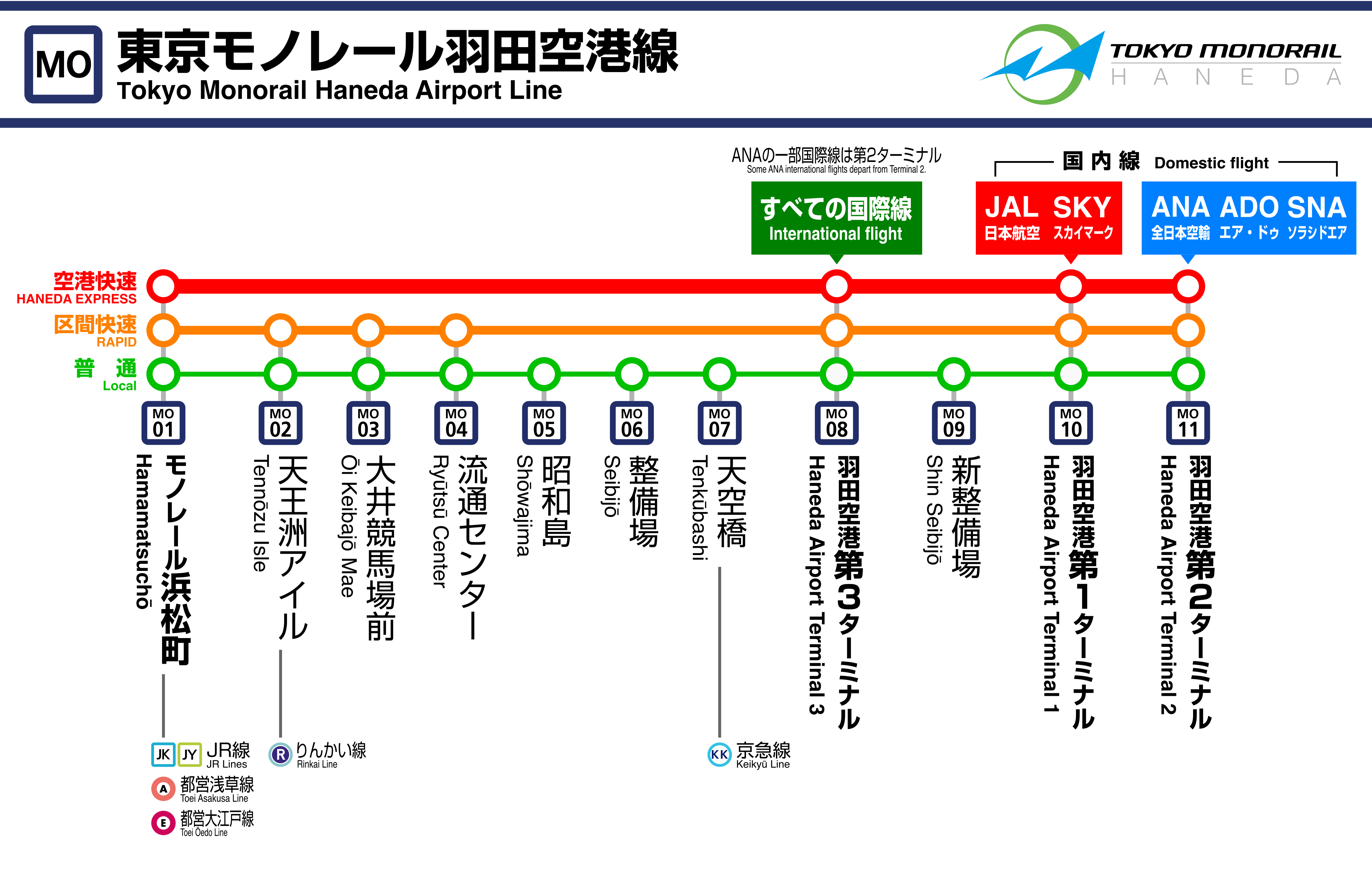

The Tokyo Monorail, (Note: Japanese: 東京モノレール, Hepburn: Tōkyō Monorēru) officially the Tokyo Monorail Haneda Airport Line, (Note: 東京モノレール羽田空港線, Tōkyō Monorēru Haneda Kūkō sen) is a straddle-beam Alweg-type monorail line in Tokyo, Japan. It provides a connection between Tokyo International Airport (Haneda) and the city's Ōta, Shinagawa, and Minato wards. The 17.8-kilometre (11.1 mi) line runs predominantly elevated along the western shore of Tokyo Bay and serves 11 stations between Hamamatsuchō and Terminal 2. The line is operated by Tokyo Monorail Co., Ltd. (Note: 東京モノレール株式会社, Tōkyō Monorēru Kabushiki-gaisha), a wholly-owned subsidiary of JR East, and carried an average of 107,871 passengers per day in Japanese fiscal year 2023.

Plans for Japan's first airport rail link emerged as Tokyo prepared to host the 1964 Summer Olympics. A company was created in 1959 to build the line; construction began in 1963, and service opened on 17 September 1964, 23 days ahead of the Olympic opening ceremony. The original line ran nonstop between Hamamatsuchō and Haneda Airport and was later expanded with infill stations and extensions.

The Tokyo Monorail is one of two rail lines serving the airport, alongside the Keikyū Airport Line. At Hamamatsuchō, passengers may transfer to the Keihin–Tōhoku and Yamanote lines of JR East, as well as the Asakusa and Oedo lines of Toei Subway via nearby Daimon Station. The monorail also connects with Tokyo Waterfront Area Rapid Transit's Rinkai Line at Tennōzu Isle Station.

In November 2025, Tokyo Monorail began using the nickname Tokyo Panorama Line for its route.

== Early history ==
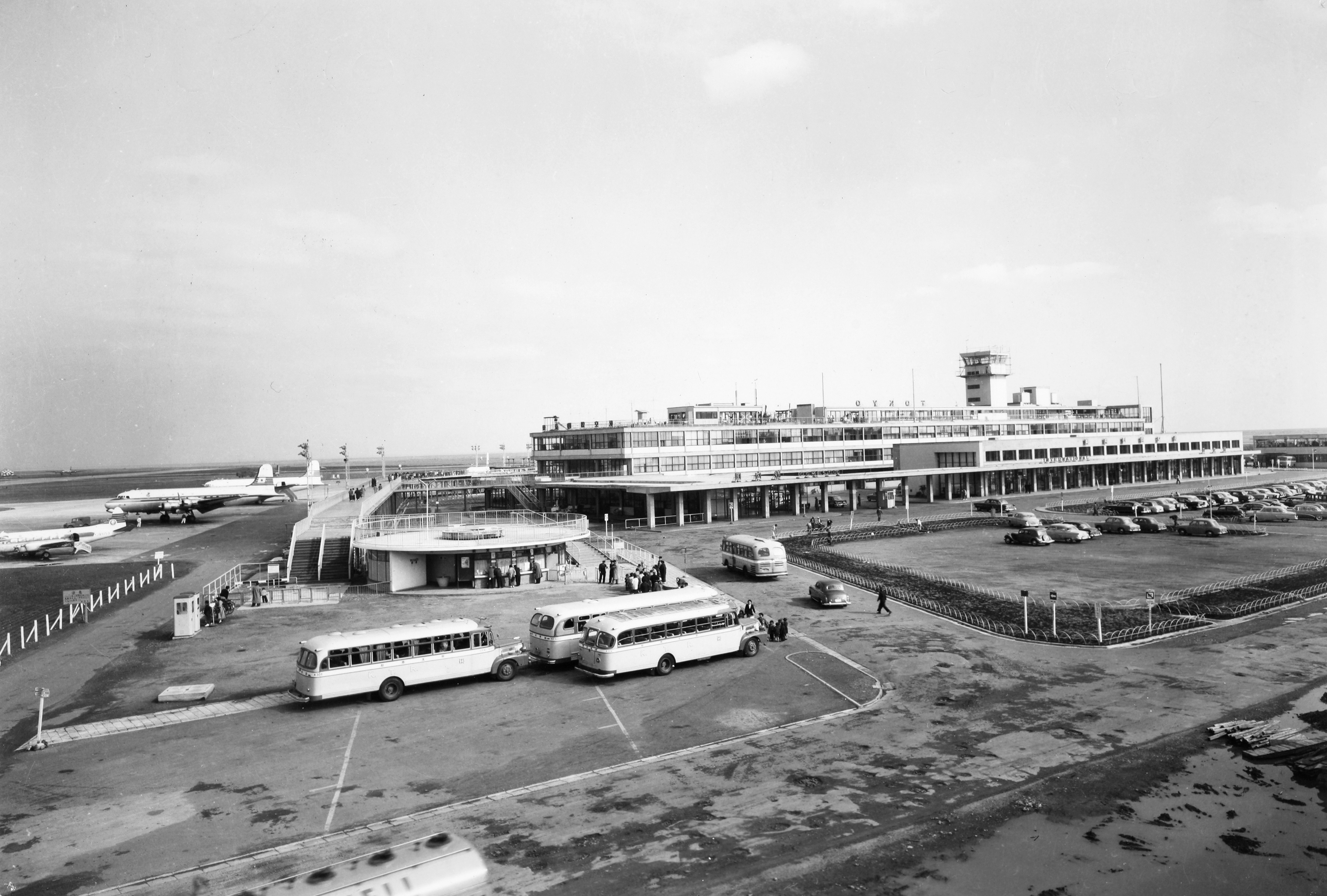
Haneda Airport in the 1950s

By the early 1950s, Tokyo's Haneda Airport had become Japan's primary international gateway as the nation's commercial aviation sector recovered from World War II. In 1959, the airport handled roughly 910,000 passengers and expected significant increases ahead of the 1964 Summer Olympics. That year, the government unveiled plans for an airport rail link to central Tokyo; a competing proposal to extend the Tokyo Expressway was briefly considered but rejected over concerns that it would worsen traffic congestion.

In August 1959, Yamato Kankō Co., Ltd. was established to build the line and was renamed Japan Elevated Railway Co., Ltd. the following year. The company applied in January 1961 for permission to construct a straddle-beam, Alweg-type monorail, selecting the system partly because company president Tetsuzō Inumaru had a long-standing friendship with Alweg founder Axel Wenner-Gren and partly because Hitachi—tasked with building the system—was eager to develop the technology further. The Ministry of Transport authorized the project in December 1961, a groundbreaking ceremony followed on 1 May 1963, and construction progressed rapidly.

Planners originally intended to extend the line from the airport to Shimbashi or Tokyo Station, and the license granted permitted construction to either location. However, local opposition near the Shibaura Canal, along with government budget constraints caused by cost overruns on the Tōkaidō Shinkansen, resulted in a shorter initial route terminating at Hamamatsuchō Station. To reduce costs further, the alignment was routed over public waterways donated by local municipalities, avoiding private land acquisition but requiring the monorail to run over reclaimed areas of Tokyo Bay and several rivers and canals. This resulted in the removal of several fishing and aquaculture operations, including a long-established seaweed field in Ōta Ward that had produced Omori no nori, a premium nori brand dating to the Edo period.

In May 1964, the company adopted its current name, Tokyo Monorail Co., Ltd. The project cost ¥21.1 billion (approximately US$60 million in 1964), including ¥20 billion for construction and ¥1.1 billion for rolling stock. Hitachi manufactured the first-generation vehicles in Japan under license from Alweg through a joint venture, and the Tokyo Monorail opened as the world's first commercial monorail and Japan's first airport rail link.

Service commenced on 17 September 1964, 23 days before the Olympic opening ceremony on 10 October. The initial line was 13.1 kilometres (8.1 mi) long, served only two stations, Hamamatsuchō and the airport, and ran almost entirely over open water, as most of Tokyo Bay's artificial islands had not yet been reclaimed. A one-way fare cost was ¥250 (equivalent to ¥1,234 in 2024), making the monorail more expensive than other options; for example, a group of four could reach the airport by taxi for less than the cost of four monorail tickets. A recession following the Olympics reduced airport traffic, causing a sharp decline in ridership. In 1966, fares were lowered to ¥150 (equivalent to ¥653 in 2024) in an effort to attract more passengers. An overpass linking the monorail platforms with the JR lines at Hamamatsuchō opened in November 1967, improving transfers.

== Infill stations and later expansions ==
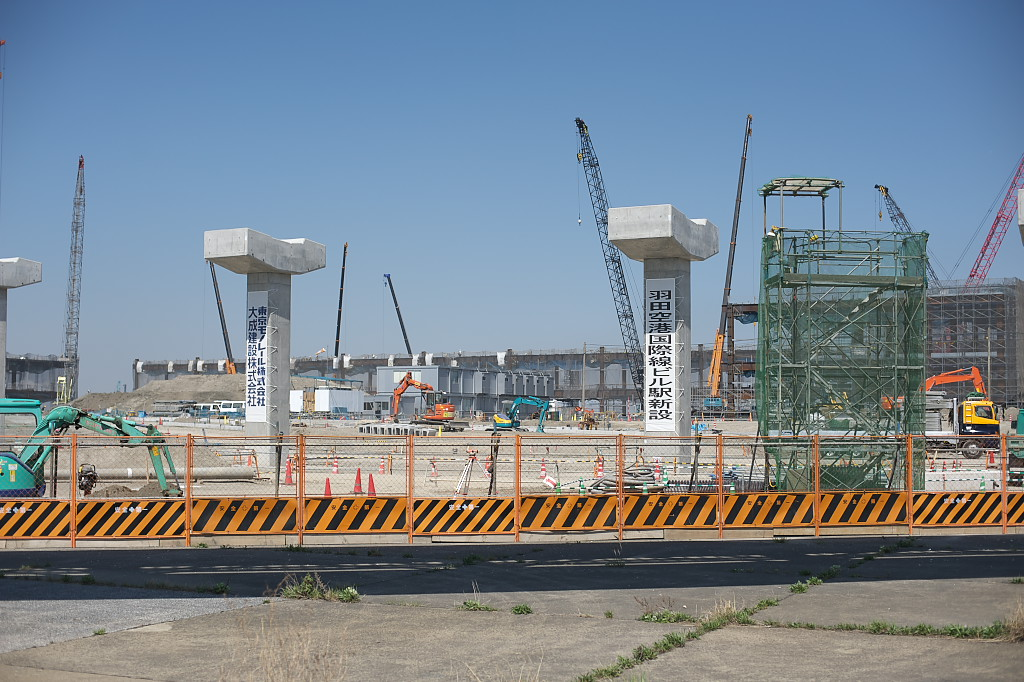
Construction of Haneda Airport Terminal 3 station, in 2009

As the area of Tokyo Bay underneath the monorail was gradually filled in and developed, new stations were added to serve these emerging districts. Ōi Keibajō Mae became the first of these infill stations when it opened in May 1965. However, because land reclamation had not yet reached the beamway, the station was built as a temporary platform suspended above the water and used only on event days at Ohi Racecourse. It was replaced by a permanent structure two years later, and the reclaimed land around it was eventually developed into the Yashio Park Town housing complex. Between 1967 and 1993, four more stations were constructed along the original alignment as reclamation and development progressed: Haneda Seibijō (later renamed Seibijō) in 1967, Shin Heiwajima (later renamed Ryūtsū Center) in 1969, Shōwajima in 1985, and Tennōzu Isle in 1992.

By the 2000s, the cumulative addition of stations had extended travel time between Hamamatsuchō and Haneda to nearly 25 minutes. In response, Shōwajima was rebuilt in 2007 as a four-track station with a passing loop, allowing express services to overtake local trains and restoring faster end-to-end operations.

The monorail has also been extended and modified in line with the relocation and expansion of Haneda Airport's terminals. When the line opened, the airport's sole passenger terminal was located on the west side of the airfield near the present-day Tenkūbashi station, and was the line's the southern terminus. With the opening of a new passenger terminal—now Terminal 1—in 1993, the monorail was extended to the new facility. Three new stations were constructed: the new terminal station; Shin Seibijō, serving nearby aircraft maintenance facilities; and Tenkūbashi, near the location of the former Haneda Station, but on the new alignment located farther west. The original airport terminal was later demolished for a runway extension, leaving the former monorail tunnel beneath it abandoned. Although its rails were removed and the entrance sealed, the tunnel remains structurally intact beneath the Runway B extension. A 0.9-kilometer (0.56 mi) extension to the then-new Terminal 2 opened on 1 December 2004, prompting the renaming of the existing Haneda Airport Station to Haneda Airport Terminal 1 Station. A new infill station serving the International Terminal opened on 21 October 2010. On 14 March 2020, all three airport stations were renamed to coincide with the redesignation of the International Terminal as Terminal 3. From north to south, the stations are now Haneda Airport Terminal 3, Haneda Airport Terminal 1, and Haneda Airport Terminal 2.

In June 2009, Tokyo Monorail Co., Ltd. announced plans to replace the single-track terminal at Hamamatsuchō—unchanged since the line opened in 1964—with a dual-track, dual-platform facility. The ¥26 billion project, expected to take six and a half years, was intended to increase capacity from 18 to 24 trains per hour and support a potential extension toward Shimbashi Station. However this terminal renovation evolved into the construction of an entirely new monorail station at Hamamatsuchō, scheduled for completion in 2027, as part of the redevelopment of the World Trade Center Building.

In August 2014, additional plans were announced to extend the line from Hamamatsuchō to Tokyo Station, running alongside the Yamanote Line between Shimbashi and Tokyo at a cost of ¥109.5 billion, with construction projected to take roughly ten years. However, in 2021 JR East unveiled the Haneda Airport Access Line, which will connect Tokyo Station to Haneda Airport using conventional rail, placing the monorail extension in doubt.

== Route ==
Monorail train, 2016

The Tokyo Monorail is 17.8 kilometers (11.1 mi) long and runs through Tokyo's Minato, Shinagawa, and Ōta wards. From its northern terminus at Hamamatsuchō, the line travels southbound, crossing above the Yamanote, Keihin–Tōhoku, Ueno–Tokyo, Tōkaidō Main, and Tokaido Shinkansen lines. Entering Shibaura, it follows the edge of canals surrounded by artificial islands. On an artificial island within Kōnan just east of Shinagawa Station and the main campus of Tokyo University of Marine Science and Technology, the monorail starts to follow the Shuto Expressway Haneda Route alignment with a stop at Tennōzu Isle.

=== Service patterns ===
Three service patterns operate on the line:

- Local (Note: 普通, Futsū)
- Rapid (Note: 区間快速, Kukan Kaisoku; lit. 'Section Rapid')
- Haneda Express (Note: 空港快速, Kūkō Kaisoku; lit. 'Airport Express')

Trains run at an average headway of four minutes, with intervals as short as three minutes and 20 seconds during peak hours.

Local trains stop at all stations and complete the line in 24 minutes. A small number of Rapid services operate each day, bypassing Shōwajima, Seibijō, Tenkūbashi, and Shin Seibijō, reducing end-to-end travel time to 21 minutes. Haneda Express trains run non-stop between Hamamatsuchō and Haneda Airport, reaching Haneda Airport Terminal 3 in 13 minutes, Terminal 1 in 16 minutes, and Terminal 2 in 18 minutes. Shōwajima Station features a four-track layout, allowing Local trains to wait while Rapid and Haneda Express services overtake them.

Rapid (Note: 快速, Kaisoku; lit. 'Express') service was introduced in December 2001 for late-night departures from Haneda Airport at 11:50 pm. The service was expanded to all-day operation three years later. In March 2007, the original Rapid service was reorganized into the current Rapid and Haneda Express patterns.

=== Stations ===
Key
●	Stops at this station
	Does not stop at this station

No.	Image	Name	Distance in km (mi)	Local	Rapid	Haneda Express	Connections and notes	Location
MO01		Monorail Hamamatsuchō モノレール浜松町	0 (0)	●	●	●	Keihin–Tōhoku Line (JK23); Yamanote Line (JY28); Asakusa Line (Daimon: A-09); Ōedo Line (Daimon: E-20)	Minato
MO02		Tennōzu Isle 天王洲アイル	4.0 (2.5)	●	●		Rinkai Line (R-05)	Shinagawa
MO03		Ōi Keibajō Mae 大井競馬場前	7.1 (4.4)	●	●		—	Shinagawa
MO04		Ryūtsū Center 流通センター	8.7 (5.4)	●	●		—	Ōta
MO05		Shōwajima 昭和島	9.9 (6.2)	●			—	Ōta
MO06		Seibijō 整備場	11.8 (7.3)	●			—	Ōta
MO07		Tenkūbashi 天空橋	12.6 (7.8)	●			Airport Line (KK15)	Ōta
MO08		Haneda Airport Terminal 3 羽田空港第３ターミナル	14.0 (8.7)	●	●	●	Airport Line (KK16)	Ōta
MO09		Shin Seibijō 新整備場	16.1 (10.0)	●			—	Ōta
MO10		Haneda Airport Terminal 1 羽田空港第１ターミナル	16.9 (10.5)	●	●	●	Airport Line (Haneda Airport Terminal 1·2: KK17)	Ōta
MO11		Haneda Airport Terminal 2 羽田空港第２ターミナル	17.8 (11.1)	●	●	●	Airport Line (Haneda Airport Terminal 1·2: KK17)	Ōta

== Rolling stock ==
All rolling stock operated by the Tokyo Monorail since its opening has been built by Hitachi Rail using the company's proprietary Hitachi Monorail system. As of 2020, the fleet consists of three types: the 1000 series, 2000 series, and 10000 series. All trainsets operate in six-car formations and can reach speeds of up to 80 kilometers per hour (50 mph).

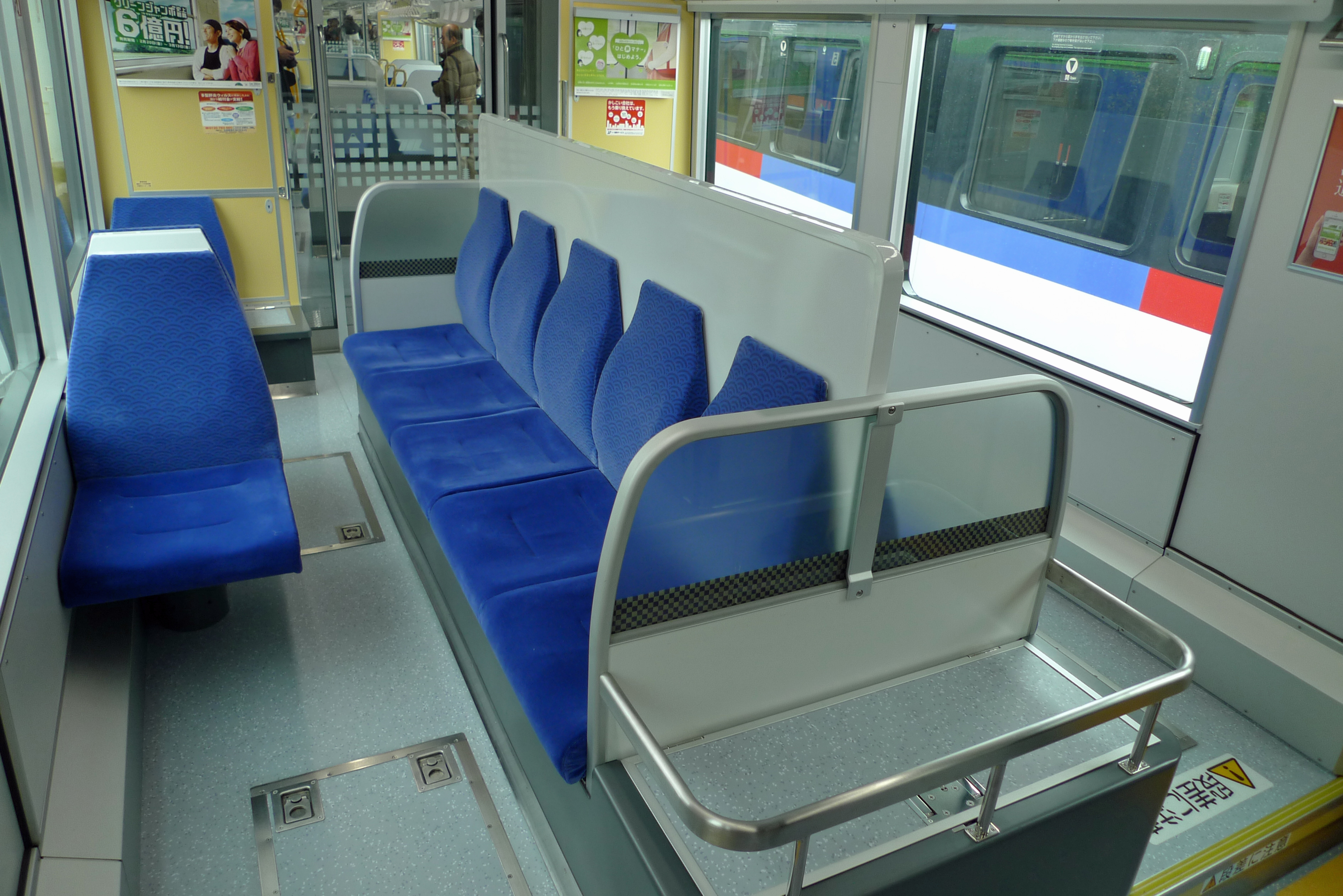
Interior of a 10000 series train showing the centrally located seats over the load-bearing wheels with baggage stowage area

Cars include a mix of aisle-facing bench seats, forward- and rear-facing seats, and centrally located seats. Because the line was built before the larger vehicle standards later adopted by the Japanese Monorail Association, the trains are shorter, and the lower floor—set below the diameter of the load-bearing wheels that ride on top of the beam—results in slight bogie intrusion, which is concealed by the centrally located seats. This differs from newer Japanese ALWEG-type monorails. Additional space is provided for baggage, and all rolling stock is stored and maintained at a depot beside Shōwajima station.

Former rolling stock included the 100/200/300/350 series (1964–1978), 500 series (1969–1991), 600 series (1977–1997), and 700/800 series (1982–1998).

The 1000 series entered service in 1989, followed by the 2000 series in 1997. On 18 July 2014, the first 10000 series six-car train entered service, replacing older 1000 series sets.

Current fleet
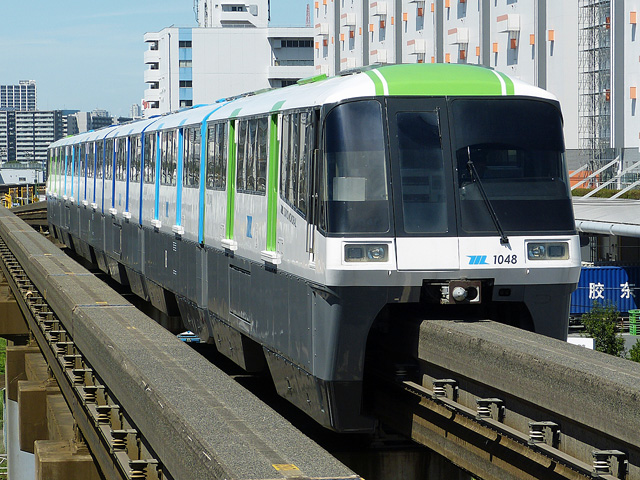
1000 series

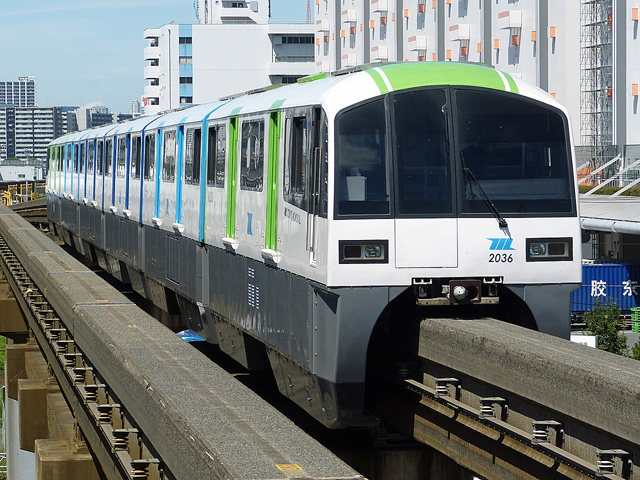
2000 series

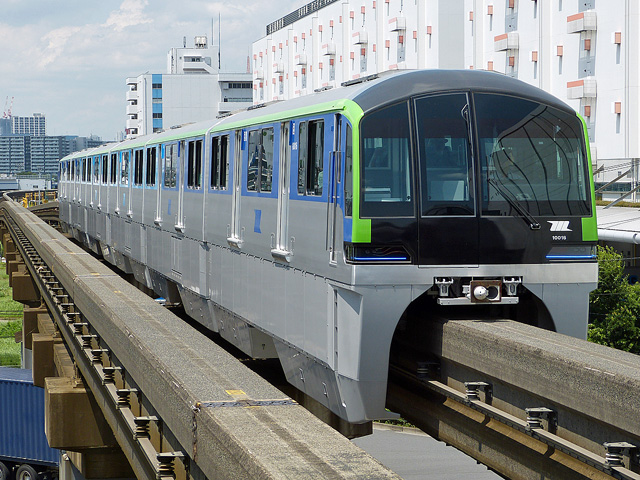
10000 series

== Service ==
The Tokyo Monorail operates from around 5:00 a.m. to midnight with over 500 trains. The first departure towards the airport leaves at 04:58 and the last departure is at 00:01. Towards Hamamatsuchō, the first departure is at 05:11 and the final departure is at 00:05 (final departure serving all stations at 23:38). Passengers using the monorail to travel to the airport can take advantage of check-in facilities at Hamamatsuchō. Japan's domestic airlines (JAL, ANA, Skymark Airlines, and Air Do) have check-in counters and ticket machines right at the station. It carried its 1.5 billionth passenger on 24 January 2007.

An alternative to the monorail is the Keikyu Airport Line between the airport and Shinagawa Station. Both railways compete with bus services.

=== Ownership ===
The line is owned and operated by Tokyo Monorail Co., Ltd. In 1967, the company merged with Hitachi Transport Co., Ltd. and Western Hitachi Transport Co., Ltd. to form Hitachi Transport Tokyo Monorail Co., Ltd. after Hitachi Transport System acquired an 81-percent share of the company. The company re-established as the Tokyo Monorail Co., Ltd. in 1981. JR East acquired a 70-percent majority share of the company from Hitachi Transport System in 2002, with the remaining 30 percent going to Hitachi, Ltd. Between 2002 and 2023, Tokyo Monorail Co., Ltd. was divided between JR East (79 percent), Hitachi (12 percent), and All Nippon Airways' holding company ANA Holdings (9 percent). In August 2023, all shares were transferred to JR East, who is currently the sole owner of the line.

=== Operation and maintenance ===
The Shōwajima Center (昭和島車両基地, Shōwajima sharyō kichi), located next to Shōwajima Station, is the operations and maintenance center of the Tokyo Monorail. The complex houses an operations control room that controls the movement of trains, a power control room that controls the line's power supply, a vehicle maintenance and storage depot where cars are inspected and serviced, a track and trolley inspection and maintenance depot, and a crew depot.

=== Fares ===
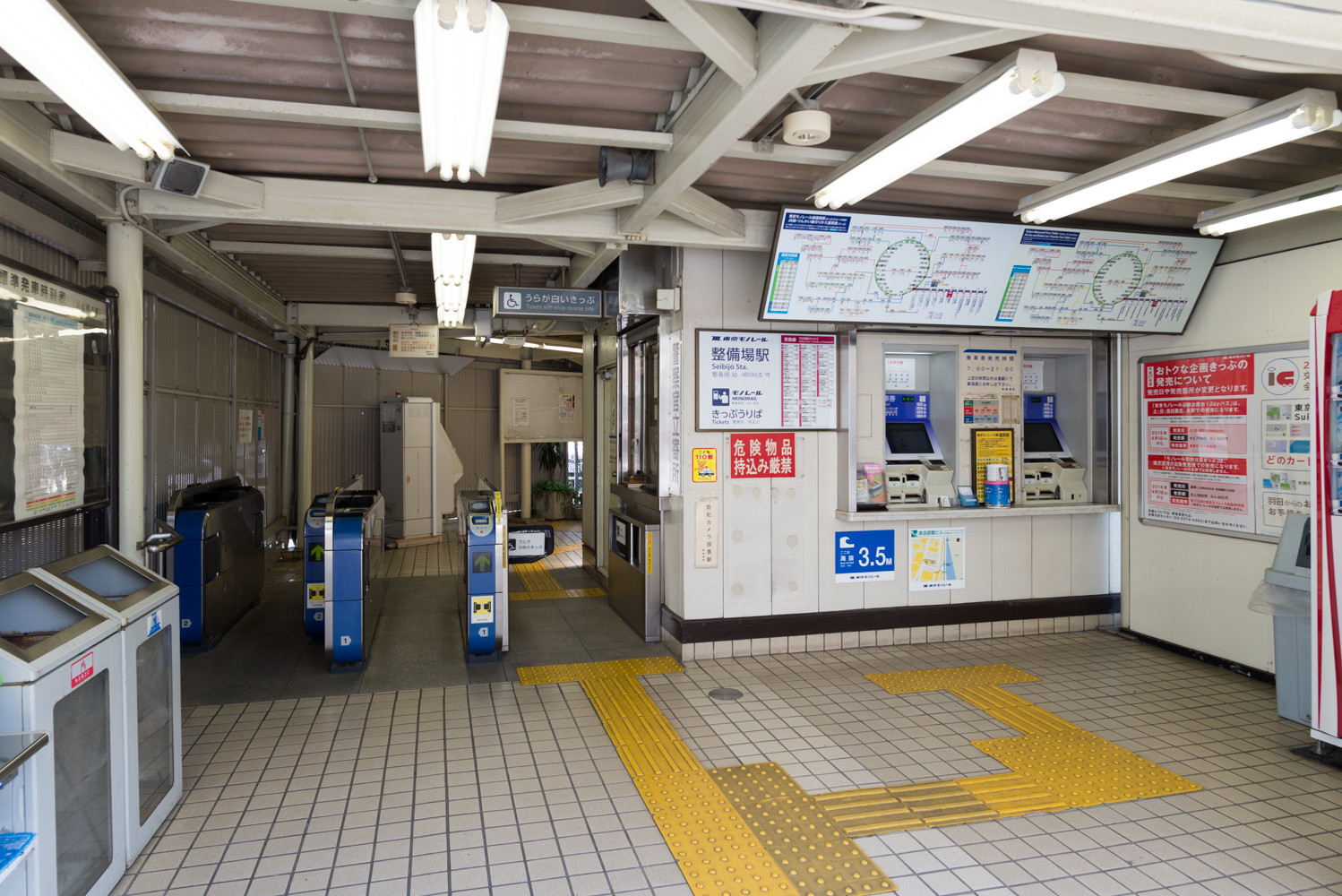
Fare gates and ticket vending machines at Seibijō Station

The Tokyo Monorail offers multiple fare types with varying lengths of validity and terms of use. One-way tickets, valid only on their day of purchase, may be used to travel between two stations without making intermediate stops. Return tickets are similar but allow for a return trip, and are valid for two days; if returning to any Haneda Airport station, they are instead valid for 10 days. Multiple-trip tickets are sold in books of 11 and are valid for three months. The purchase of "school commuter" multiple-trip tickets requires proof of a student discount certificate with the Open University of Japan. Groups of 15 or more can acquire discounted group tickets. A special discount ticket is offered to riders needing to transfer to JR East's Yamanote Line. Adult commuter passes are also available.

Tokyo Monorail began accepting the contactless smart card Suica on 21 April 2002, and accepts other Mutual Use cards as well, such as PASMO. In 2009, the company began selling a specialized Suica design, branded as "Monorail Suica". After a suspension of sales (except for commuter passes) due to the 2020–2023 global chip shortage, it was announced in January 2025 that the cards would be discontinued in March of that year, with sales shifting to the default Suica design.

Paper tickets may be purchased from ticket vending machines at any Tokyo Monorail station. As of June 2020, tickets can also be purchased from machines at the following airports: Fukuoka Airport, Hakodate Airport, Hiroshima Airport, Itami and Kansai airports in Osaka, Kagoshima Airport, Kumamoto Airport, Nagasaki Airport, Naha Airport, New Chitose Airport in Sapporo, Oita Airport, Okayama Airport, Takamatsu Airport, and Toyama Airport.

Passengers transferring between the International and Domestic Terminals at Haneda Airport can travel for free on the monorail and Keikyu line by collecting a ticket from the information desk.

== See also ==
- Monorails in Japan
