= Tokyo Monorail 1000 series =

Japanese train type

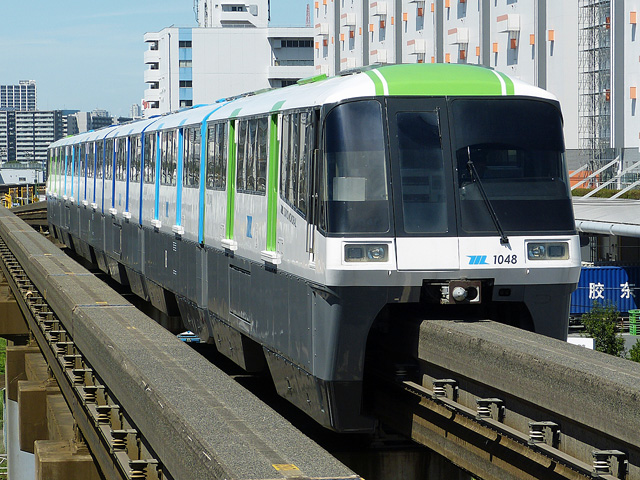
- Refurbished & reliveried set 1043 in September 2016

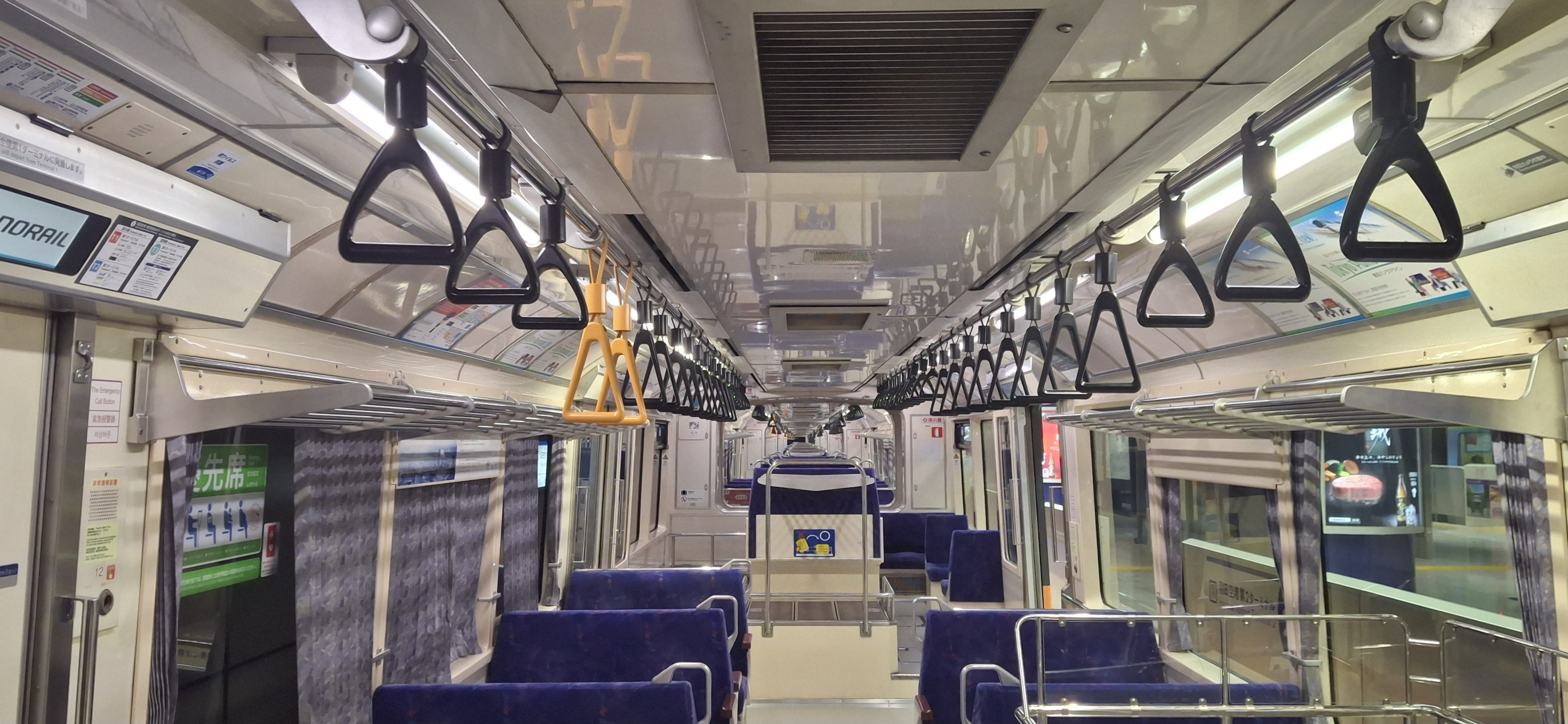
- In service: 1989–
- Constructed: 1989–1996
- Number built: 96 vehicles (16 sets)
- Number in service: 60 vehicles (10 sets)
- Number scrapped: 36 vehicles (6 sets)
- Formation: 6 cars per trainset
- Fleet numbers: 1001–1091
- Capacity: 584
- Operator: Tokyo Monorail
- Depot: Showajima
- Line served: Tokyo Monorail Haneda Airport Line

Specifications
- Car body construction: Aluminium alloy
- Car length: 16.550 m (54 ft 3.6 in) (end cars); 15.200 m (49 ft 10.4 in) (intermediate cars)
- Width: 3.038 m (9 ft 11.6 in)
- Height: 4.362 m (14 ft 3.7 in)
- Doors: 2 pairs per side
- Maximum speed: 80 km/h (50 mph)
- Traction system: Resistor control
- Power output: 70 kW x 24
- Acceleration: 3.5 km/(h⋅s) (2.2 mph/s)
- Deceleration: 4.0 km/(h⋅s) (2.5 mph/s) (service); 4.5 km/(h⋅s) (2.8 mph/s) (emergency)
- Electric system: 750 V DC
- Current collection: Side contact
- Safety system: ATC
- Track gauge: (straddle-beam monorail)

The Tokyo Monorail 1000 series (東京モノレール1000形, Tōkyō Monorēru 1000-gata) is a monorail electric multiple unit (EMU) train type operated by the Tokyo Monorail on the Tokyo Monorail Haneda Airport Line in Japan since 1989.

== Overview ==
The 1000 series trains were introduced from 1989 to replace earlier non-air-conditioned rolling stock and to provide increased capacity with the expansion and relocation of the terminal building at Haneda Airport.

== Formation ==
As of 1 April 2016, the fleet consists of 13 six-car sets (numbered 1001 to 1091) as shown below, with all cars motored. Car 1 is at the Hamamatsucho end.

Car No.	1	2	3	4	5	6
Designation	Mc1	M2	M1'	M2'	M1	Mc2
Numbering	1000	1000	1000	1000	1000	1000

== Interior ==
Passenger accommodation consists of a mixture of facing 4-seat bays.

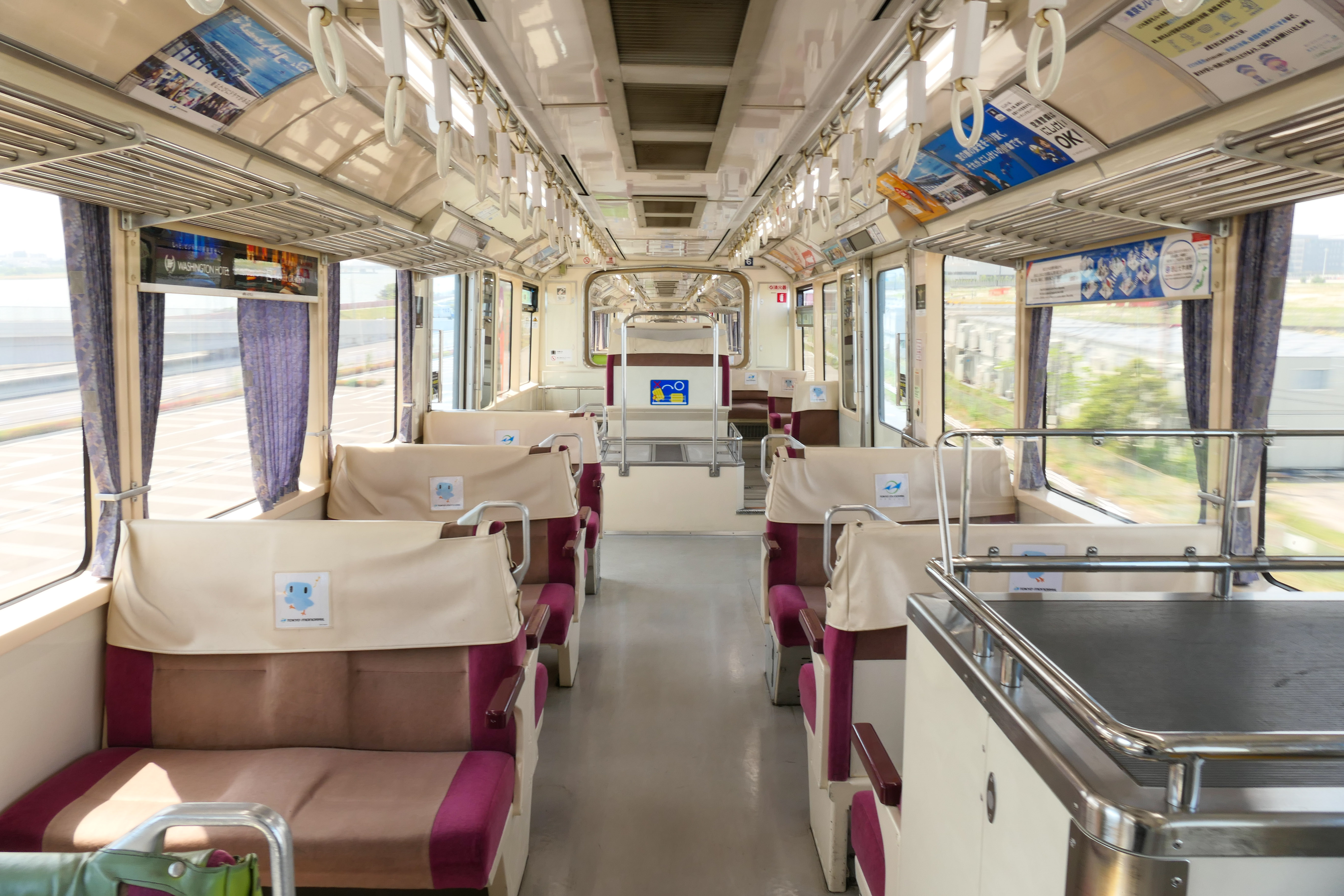
Interior view

== History ==
The fleet of 16 trainsets was delivered between 1989 and 1996 in eight batches, batches 16 to 23, with differing seating configurations. The first set was delivered on 5 June 1989, with the last set delivered by 10 June 1996.

In 2002, the fleet was modified for wanman driver-only operation. In 2004, LED destination indicators were added to the sides of the trains, coinciding with the introduction of limited-stop "Rapid" services on the line. A programme of life-extension refurbishment was subsequently implemented, including new seat moquette. As of March 2014, five sets have been treated.

== Livery variations ==
Originally delivered in a livery of black with red and white, the 1000 series trains were repainted from 2000 into a new livery of black, blue, orange, and white. A number of "revival" livery variations subsequently appeared, with set 1019 receiving a light blue and white "100 series style" livery in 2003, set 1085 receiving the original 1000 series style black with red and white livery in 2013, and set 1049 receiving a red with white "500 series style" livery in 2014. Set 1091 received a new livery of white with lime green, light blue and navy blue in 2015, followed by sets 1043 and 1061 in 2016 and 2019 respectively.

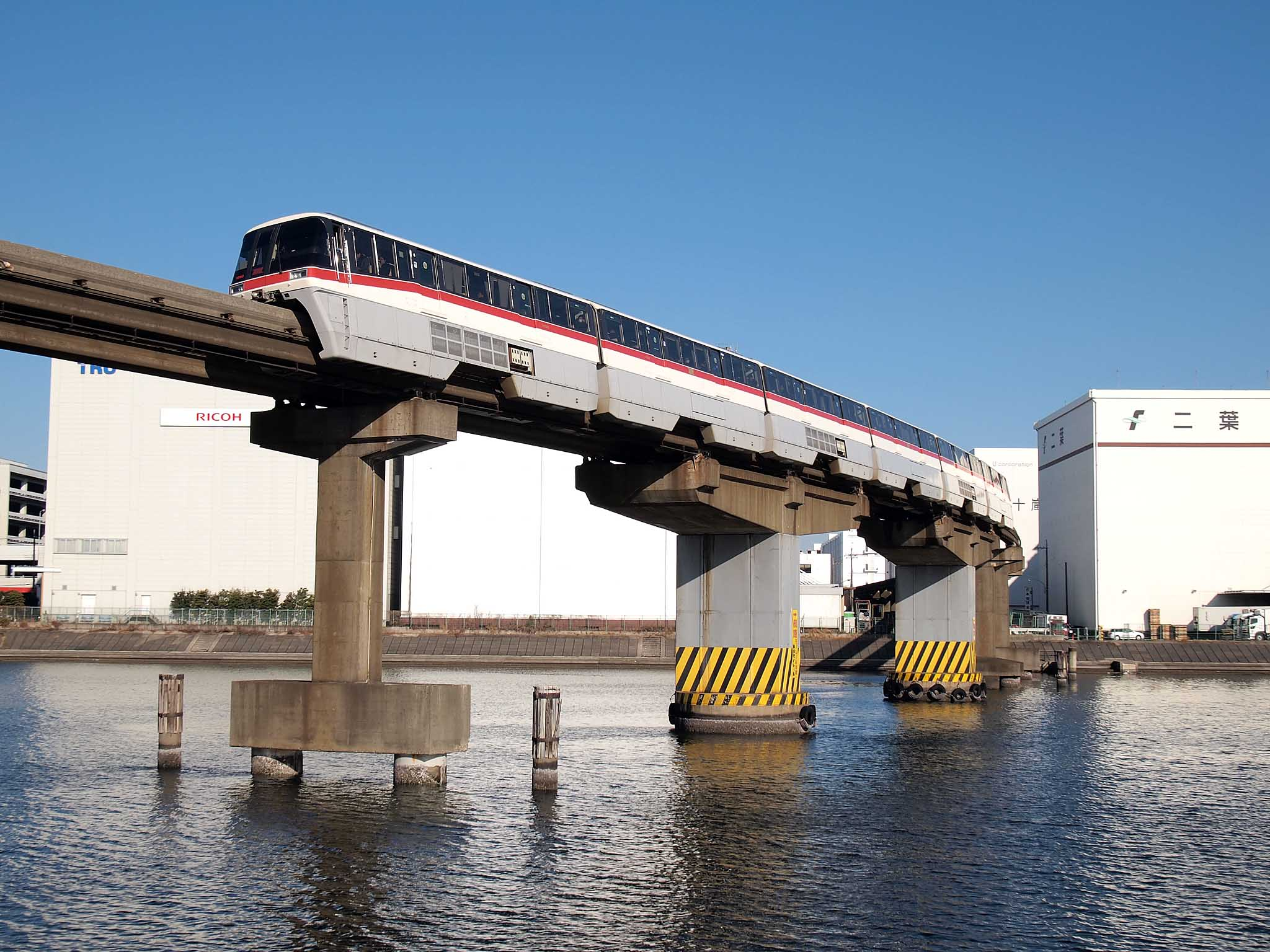
Set 1085 in original 1000 series livery in January 2014

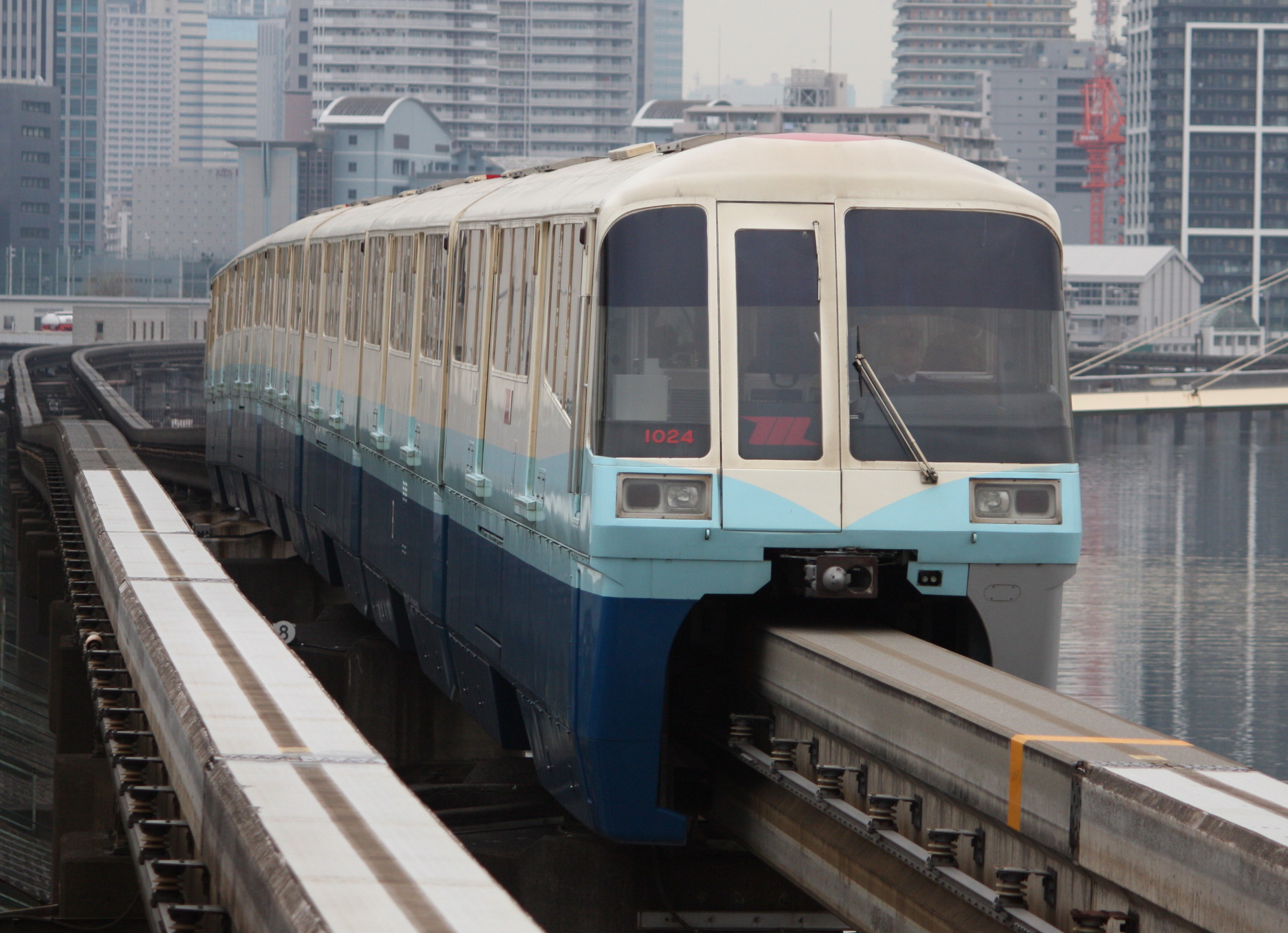
Set 1019 in "100 series style" livery in February 2009

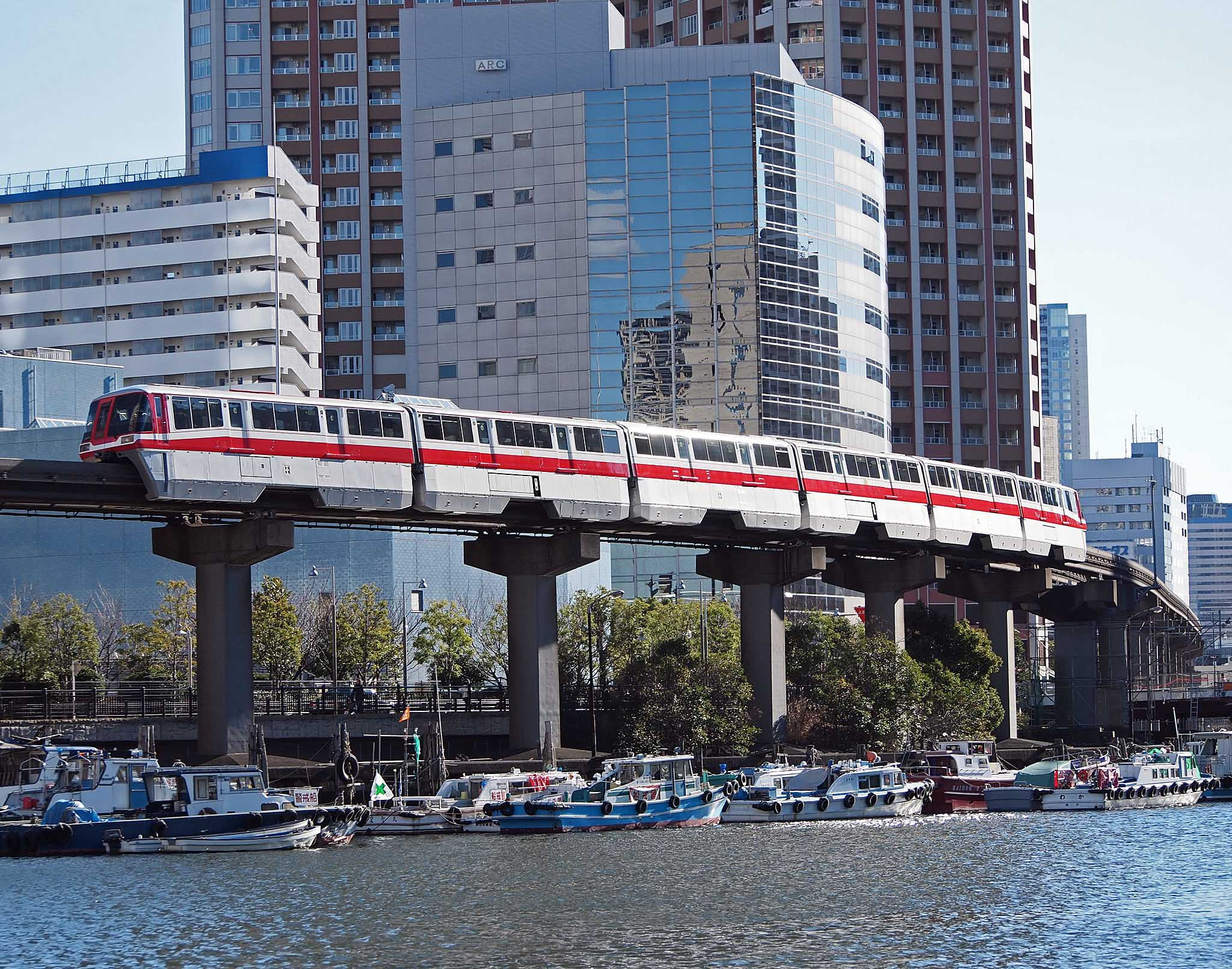
Set 1049 in "500 series style" livery in January 2014

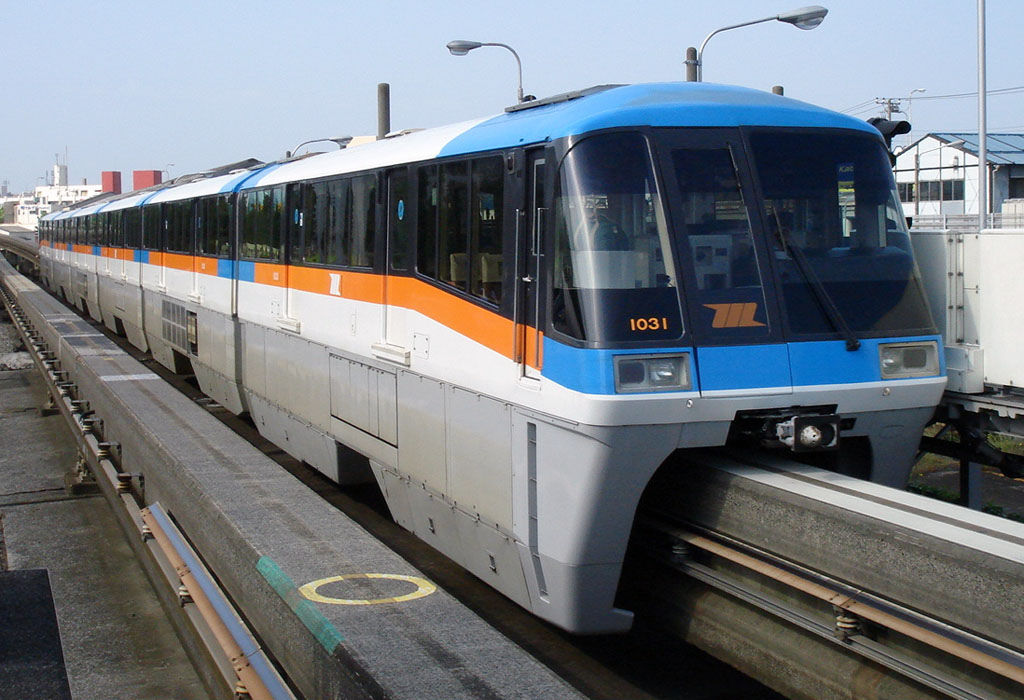
Set 1031 in 2000s era livery in May 2006

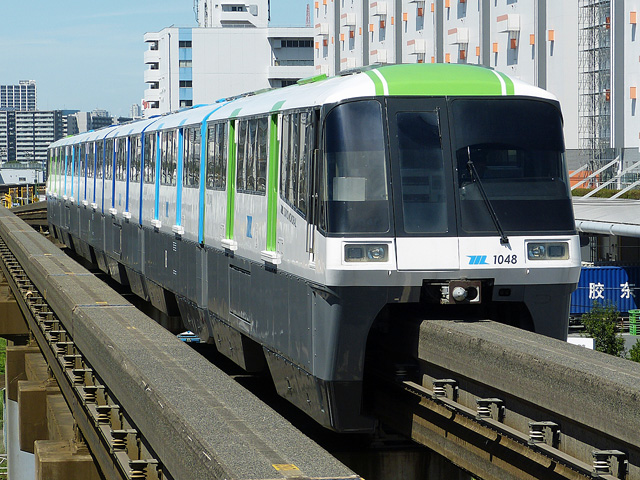
Set 1043 in new white with lime green, light blue and navy blue livery in September 2016

== Awards ==
The 1000 series trains received the Japanese Good Design Award in 1990.
