= Shōwajima Station =

Monorail station in Tokyo, Japan

Coordinates: 35.5704°N 139.7499°E

MO05 Shōwajima Station 昭和島駅
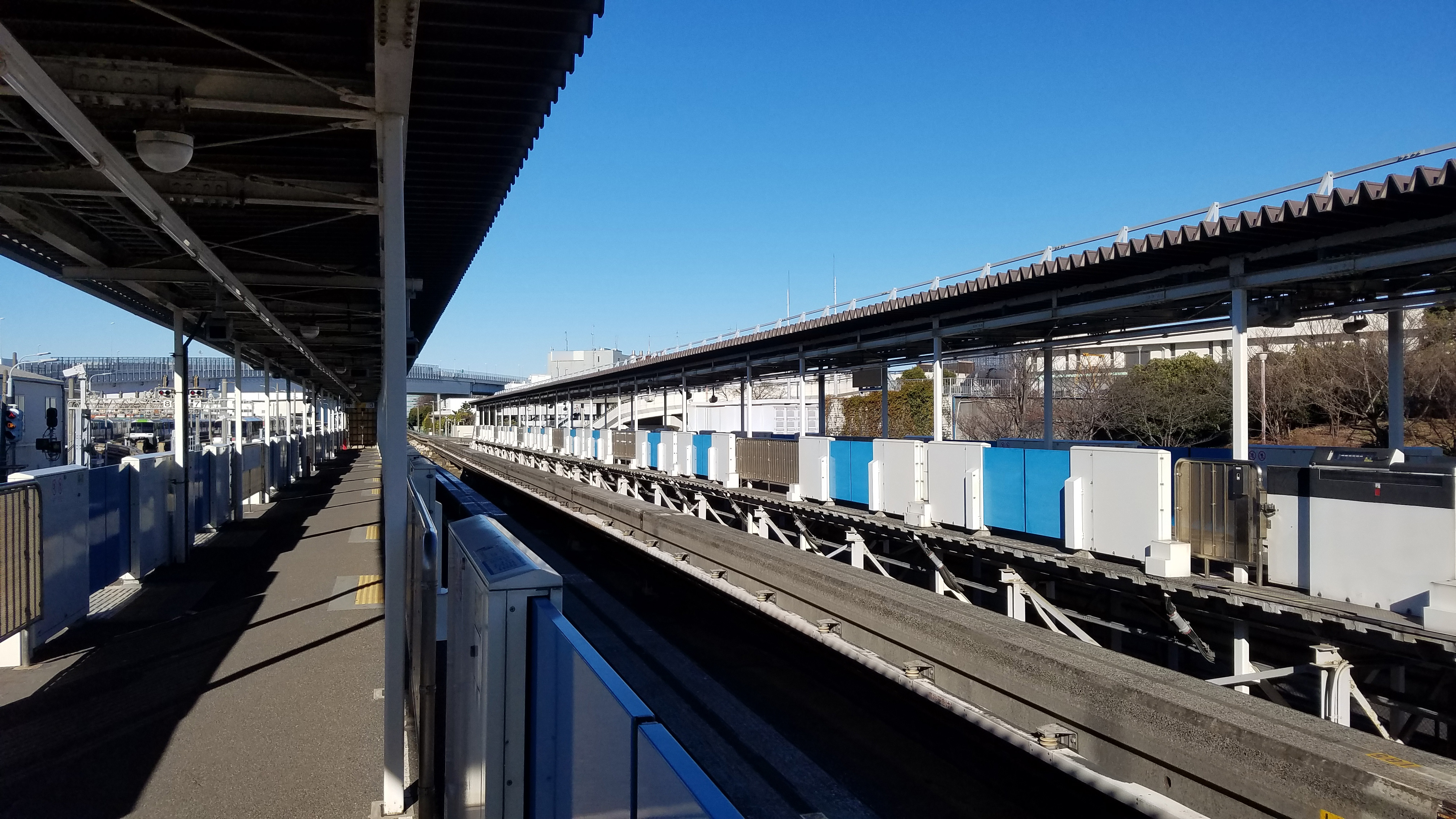
- The platforms at the Shōwajima Station in January 2022

General information
- Location: 2-2-1 Shōwajima; Ōta, Tokyo; Japan
- Operator: Tokyo Monorail
- Distance: 9.9 km (6.2 mi) from Monorail Hamamatsuchō
- Platforms: 2 island platforms
- Tracks: 4
- Connections: Bus stop

Construction
- Structure type: At-grade

Other information
- Station code: MO-05

History
- Opened: 7 February 1985
- Rebuilt: 2007

Passengers
- FY2011: 4,411 daily

Services
Preceding station	Tokyo Monorail	Following station
Ryūtsū Center MO04 towards Monorail Hamamatsuchō	Haneda Airport Line Local	Seibijō MO06 towards Haneda Airport Terminal 2
Location
- Location within Special wards of Tokyo Location within Tokyo Location within Japan

Shōwajima Station (Japanese: 昭和島駅, Hepburn: Shōwajima-eki) is a station on the Tokyo Monorail in Ōta, Tokyo, Japan.

== Lines ==
Shōwajima Station is served by the Tokyo Monorail Haneda Airport Line between Monorail Hamamatsuchō station in central Tokyo and Haneda Airport Terminal 2 station, and lies 9.9 kilometres (6.2 mi) from the northern terminus of the line at Hamamatsuchō. Only all-stops "Local" services stop at this station.

== Station layout ==
The station has two island platforms serving four tracks. The platforms are connected by underpass with entrances and ticket barriers on the east and west sides of the station.

Local trains normally use tracks 1 and 4, while allowing non-stop Haneda Express and Rapid services to pass. Tracks 2 and 3 can be used for local trains during irregular operations.

1	■ Tokyo Monorail	Local for Haneda Airport Terminal 1 and Haneda Airport Terminal 2
2	■ Tokyo Monorail	Haneda Express and Rapid (non-stop) for Haneda Airport Terminal 1 and Haneda Airport Terminal 2
3	■ Tokyo Monorail	Haneda Express and Rapid (non-stop) for Monorail Hamamatsuchō
4	■ Tokyo Monorail	Local for Monorail Hamamatsuchō

== History ==
The station opened on 7 February 1985 as a part-time, unstaffed stop beside the monorail’s Shōwajima maintenance depot, serving depot employees and workers at nearby factories. On 19 June 1992, all Local trains began stopping at Shōwajima Station, and the station became fully staffed on 28 September 2000.

By the 2000s, the gradual addition of stations along the monorail line had greatly increased the travel time between Hamamatsuchō and Haneda. In response, Shōwajima was rebuilt in 2007 as a four-track station with a passing loop, enabling express services to overtake local trains and restoring faster end‑to‑end travel times.

== Passenger statistics ==
In fiscal 2011, the station was used by an average of 4,411 passengers daily.

== Surrounding area ==
- Showajima Maintenance Depot
