= Haneda Station =

Haneda Station (羽田駅, Haneda Eki) or Haneda Airport Station (羽田空港駅, Haneda Kūkō Eki) may refer to:

- Keikyu's Anamori-inari Station, formerly named Haneda Station (1913–1915)
- Keikyū's Tenkūbashi Station, formerly named Haneda Airport Station (1956–1993) and Haneda Station (1993-1998)
- Tokyo Monorail's Tenkūbashi Station, formerly named Haneda Station (1964-1998)
- Tokyo Monorail's Haneda Airport Terminal 1 Station, formerly named Haneda Airport Station (1993–2004)
- Keikyu's Haneda Airport Terminal 1·2 Station, formerly Haneda Airport Station (1998–2010) and Haneda Airport Domestic Terminal Station (2010–2020)
- JR East's Haneda Airport New Station, currently under construction

== See also ==
- Haneda Airport Terminal 2 Station
- Haneda Airport Terminal 3 Station, formerly Haneda Airport International Terminal Station (2010–2020)
