= Tenkūbashi Station =

Railway and monorail station in Tokyo, Japan

KK15 MO07 Tenkūbashi Station 天空橋駅
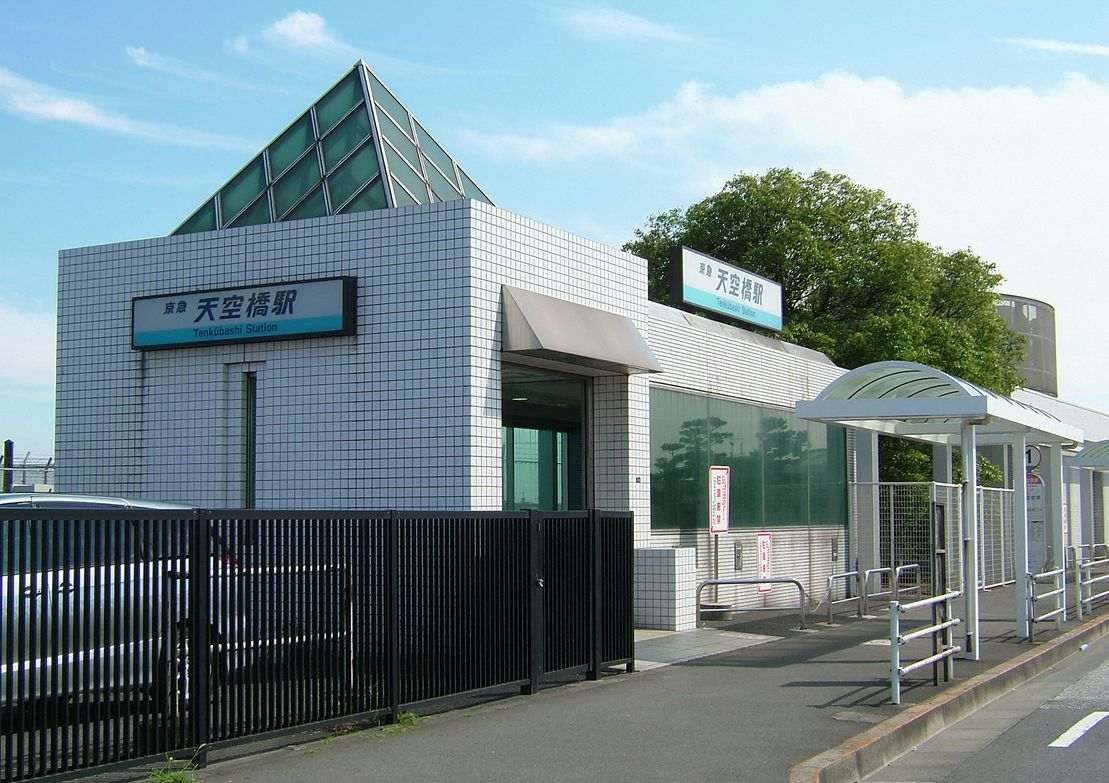
- The Keikyu Station entrance in June 2007

General information
- Location: 1-1-2 Haneda Kūkō; Ōta, Tokyo; Japan
- Coordinates: 35.5491°N 139.7541°E
- Operator: Keikyu; Tokyo Monorail
- Lines: Keikyū Airport Line; Tokyo Monorail Haneda Airport Line
- Distance: Keikyū Airport Line: 3.3 km (2.1 mi) from Keikyū Kamata; Tokyo Monorail: 17.8 km (11.1 mi) from Monorail Hamamatsuchō
- Platforms: Keikyū Airport Line: 2 side platforms; Tokyo Monorail: 2 side platforms
- Tracks: Keikyū Airport Line: 2; Tokyo Monorail: 2

Construction
- Structure type: Underground
- Accessible: Yes

Other information
- Station code: Keikyū Airport Line: KK15; Tokyo Monorail: MO07

History
- Opened: Keikyū Airport Line: 1 April 1993; Tokyo Monorail: 27 September 1993
- Former names: Haneda (until November 1998)

Services
| Preceding station | Keikyu | Following station |
|---|---|---|
| Haneda Airport Terminal 3 KK16 towards Haneda Airport Terminal 1·2 | Airport Line Limited Express (Tokkyū) Express Local | Anamori-inari KK14 towards Keikyū Kamata |
| Preceding station | Tokyo Monorail | Following station |
| Seibijō MO06 towards Monorail Hamamatsuchō | Haneda Airport Line Local | Haneda Airport Terminal 3 MO08 towards Haneda Airport Terminal 2 |
Location
- Location within Tokyo Location within Japan

Tenkūbashi Station (Japanese: 天空橋駅, Hepburn: Tenkūbashi-eki; Sky Bridge Station) is a railway station in Ōta, Tokyo, Japan, operated jointly by Tokyo Monorail and the private railway operator Keikyu. It is named after a nearby pedestrian bridge that was completed in 1993.

== Lines ==
Tenkūbashi Station is served by the Keikyū Airport Line between Keikyū Kamata station and Haneda Airport Terminal 1·2 station, and lies 3.3 kilometres (2.1 mi) from the western terminus of the line at Kamata. From Kamata, most trains continue either towards Shinagawa station in central Tokyo or Yokohama. Local, Express and Tokkyū Limited Express services stop at this station; Kaitoku Limited Express and Airport Limited Express services do not stop.

The station is also served by the Tokyo Monorail Haneda Airport Line between Monorail Hamamatsuchō station in central Tokyo and Haneda Airport Terminal 2 station, and lies 17.8 kilometres (11.1 mi) from the northern terminus of the line at Hamamatsuchō. Only Local services stop at this station; Rapid and Haneda Express services do not stop.

== Station layout ==
Each of the Keikyu and Tokyo Monorail sections of the station has two side platforms serving two tracks. The Tokyo Monorail platforms are unnumbered. Both lines are underground.

=== Keikyu ===
| 1 | Keikyū Airport Line | for Haneda Airport Terminal 1·2 |
| 2 | Keikyū Airport Line | for Keikyū Kamata; Keikyū Main Line for Shinagawa and Sengakuji; Toei Asakusa Line for Shimbashi and Oshiage; Keisei Oshiage Line for Aoto; Keisei Main Line for Keisei Funabashi and Narita Airport; Hokusō Line for Inba-Nihon-Idai; Narita Sky Access Line for Narita Airport; Keikyū Main Line for Yokohama and Kanazawa-hakkei; Keikyū Zushi Line for Zushi·Hayama; Keikyū Kurihama Line for Keikyū Kurihama |

=== Tokyo Monorail ===
| - | Tokyo Monorail Haneda Airport Line | for Haneda Airport Terminal 1 and Haneda Airport Terminal 2 |
| - | Tokyo Monorail Haneda Airport Line | for Hamamatsuchō |

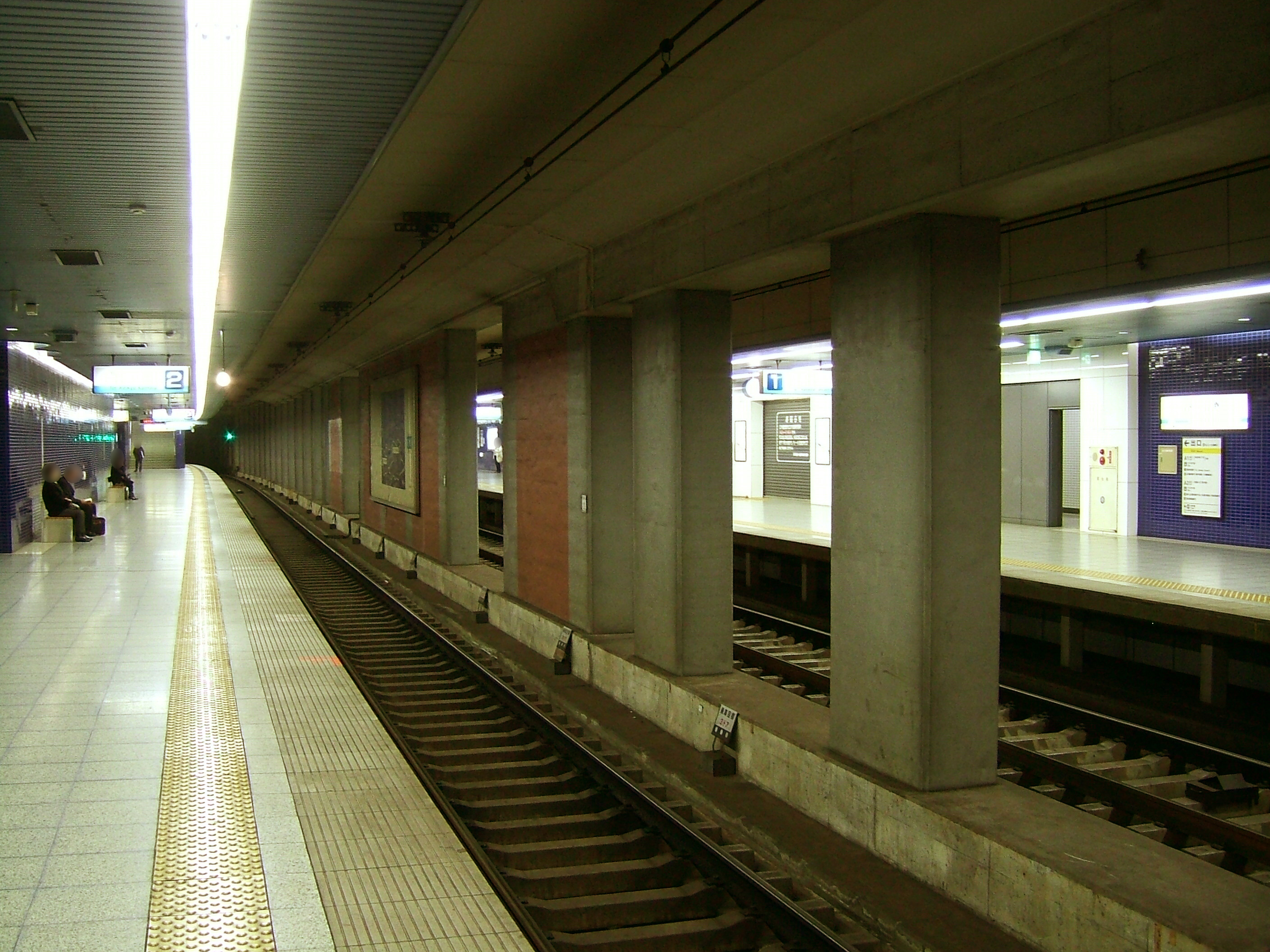
The Keikyu platforms in November 2008

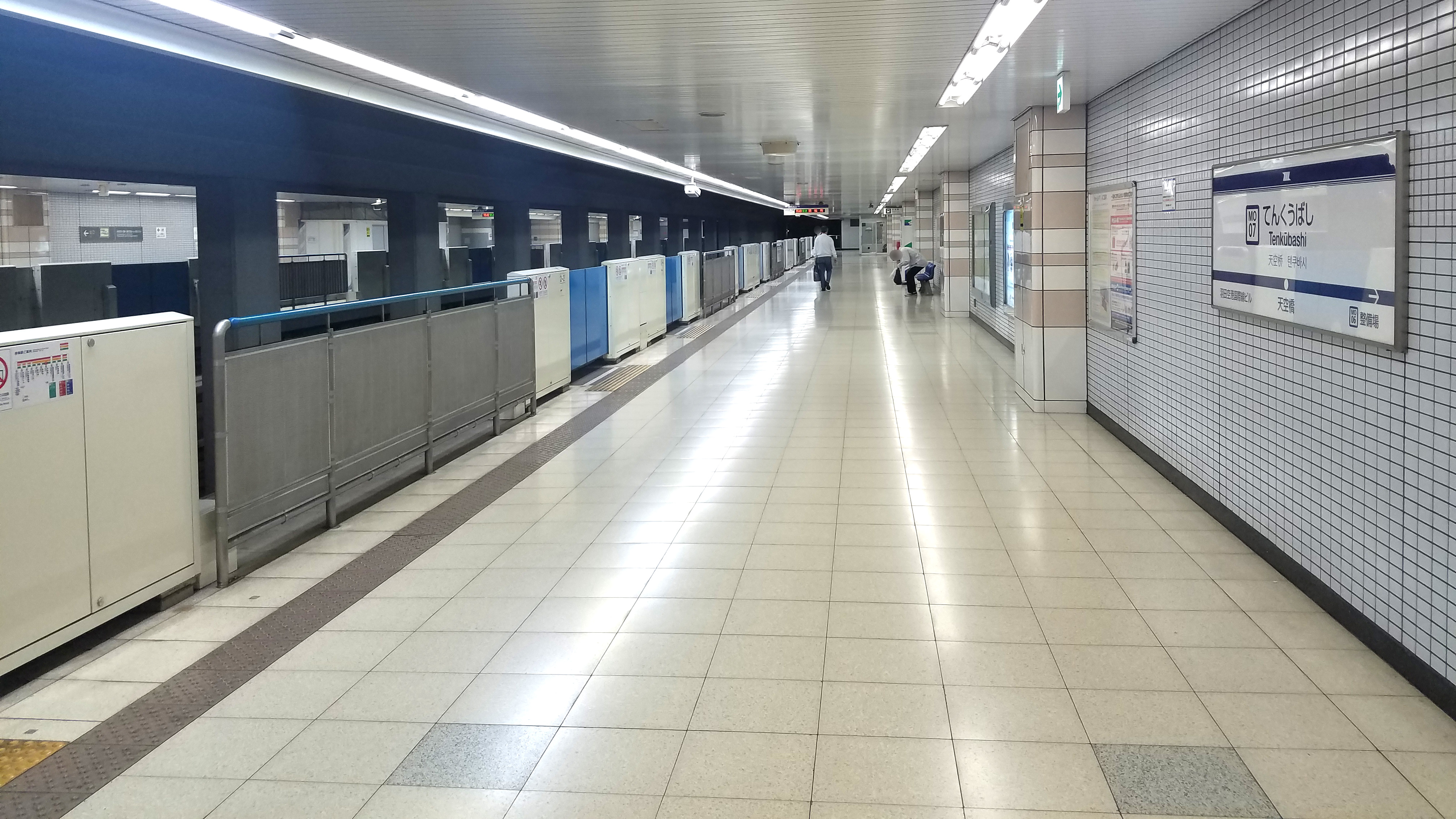
The Tokyo Monorail platforms in November 2019

== History ==
The station replaced two earlier facilities associated with Haneda Airport's original layout, when the airport's sole passenger terminal was located on the south side of the airfield, near the present-day site of Terminal 3.

Tenkūbashi Station is located near the former site of Keikyū's original Haneda Airport Station (羽田空港駅), which opened in 1956 on the western bank of the Ebitori River, across from the present station. That station served as the eastern terminus of the Keikyū Airport Line from 1956 to 1991, but was located a considerable distance from the terminal and provided only all-stops shuttle service to Kamata. Passengers therefore had to walk long distances or use taxis to between the air terminal and the rail station, then transfer at Kamata to continue toward central Tokyo. Shuttle bus service between the terminal and the station was not provided for much of its operating life, and the limited size of the station constrained bus operations.

The Tokyo Monorail's Haneda Station (羽田駅) opened on 17 September 1964 near the original passenger terminal and served as the southern terminus of the line, becoming the primary rapid transit link between Haneda Airport and central Tokyo. The site of this original station was near the southern end of the present Runway 4 and Terminal 3.

A major redevelopment of Haneda Airport began in the early 1990s. The new "Big Bird" terminal (now Terminal 1) opened on reclaimed land on the north side of the airfield in September 1993, prompting major realignments and extensions of both the Keikyu Airport Line and the Tokyo Monorail.

Keikyu closed its original airport station in January 1991 and opened a new Haneda Station on 1 April 1993 at the present site of Tenkūbashi Station, which initially served as the eastern terminus of the line. As part of the same project, a new pedestrian bridge over the Ebitori River was constructed to connect residents near the former station to the new one. Following a public naming contest, the bridge was named Tenkūbashi (Sky Bridge) and opened on the same day as the station.

The Tokyo Monorail alignment was also shifted farther south, with new stations opened at the new terminal and at the Keikyu station site to enable transfers between the two lines. The original Haneda Airport station was also closed. When the new terminal opened in September 1993, Keikyu passengers used the monorail to reach it.

In 1998, the Keikyu Airport Line was extended in a tunnel beneath the airfield to a location near Terminal 1 and the future location of Terminal 2, which became the primary airport access station. At that time, the former Haneda Station was renamed Tenkūbashi Station to avoid confusion with the new airport terminal station.

In the 2020s, the land above and around the station was redeveloped as Haneda Innovation City, a mixed-use complex incorporating office buildings, hotels, and commercial facilities.

== Passenger statistics ==
In fiscal 2011, the Keikyu station was used by an average of 18,613 passengers daily, and the Tokyo Monorail station was used by an average of 9,752 passengers daily.

== Surrounding area ==
- Haneda Airport
- Haneda Innovation City
- Haneda Shrine
- Anamori Inari Shrine

== See also ==
- List of railway stations in Japan
