= Ōtorii Station =

Railway station in Tokyo, Japan

KK13 Ōtorii Station 大鳥居駅
- The station entrance in September 2026

General information
- Location: 3-37-18 Nishi-kojiya; Ōta, Tokyo; Japan
- Coordinates: 35.5525°N 139.7395°E
- Owner: Keikyu
- Line: Keikyū Airport Line
- Distance: 1.9 km from Keikyu Kamata
- Platforms: 2 side platforms
- Tracks: 2

Construction
- Structure type: Underground
- Accessible: Yes

Other information
- Station code: KK13
- Website: Official website

History
- Opened: 28 June 1902
- Rebuilt: 1997

Passengers
- FY2011: 27,342 daily

Services
Preceding station	Keikyu	Following station
Anamori-inari KK14 towards Haneda Airport Terminal 1·2	Airport Line Tokkyū Limited Express Express Local	Kōjiya KK12 towards Keikyū Kamata
Location
- Location within Tokyo Location within Japan

Ōtorii Station (大鳥居駅, Ōtorii-eki) is a railway station on the Keikyū Airport Line in Ōta, Tokyo, Japan, operated by the private railway operator Keikyu. The station is numbered "KK13".

== Lines ==
Ōtorii Station is served by the Keikyū Airport Line, and lies 1.9 km from the starting point of the line at Keikyū Kamata.

== Station layout ==
The station has two underground opposed side platforms serving two tracks.

=== Platforms ===
1	Keikyū Airport Line	for Haneda Airport Terminal 1·2
2	Keikyū Airport Line	for Keikyū Kamata; Keikyū Main Line for Shinagawa and Sengakuji; Toei Asakusa Line for Shimbashi and Oshiage; Keisei Oshiage Line for Aoto; Keisei Main Line for Keisei Funabashi and Narita Airport; Hokusō Line for Inba-Nihon-Idai; Narita Sky Access Line for Narita Airport; Keikyū Main Line for Yokohama and Kanazawa-hakkei; Keikyū Zushi Line for Zushi·Hayama; Keikyū Kurihama Line for Keikyū Kurihama

The platforms in September 2026

== History ==
The station opened on 28 June 1902. The station was rebuilt with underground platforms in 1997.

Keikyu introduced station numbering to its stations on 21 October 2010; Ōtorii was assigned station number KK13.

== Passenger statistics ==
In fiscal 2011, the station was used by an average of 27,342 passengers daily.

== Surrounding area ==
Sega's headquarters were once located near this station until 2018, when it was relocated to the Sumitomo Fudosan Osaki Garden Tower in Shinagawa near Ōsaki Station.

== See also ==
- List of railway stations in Japan
