= Kōjiya Station =

Railway station in Tokyo, Japan

Coordinates: 35.5543°N 139.7298°E

KK12 Kōjiya Station 糀谷駅
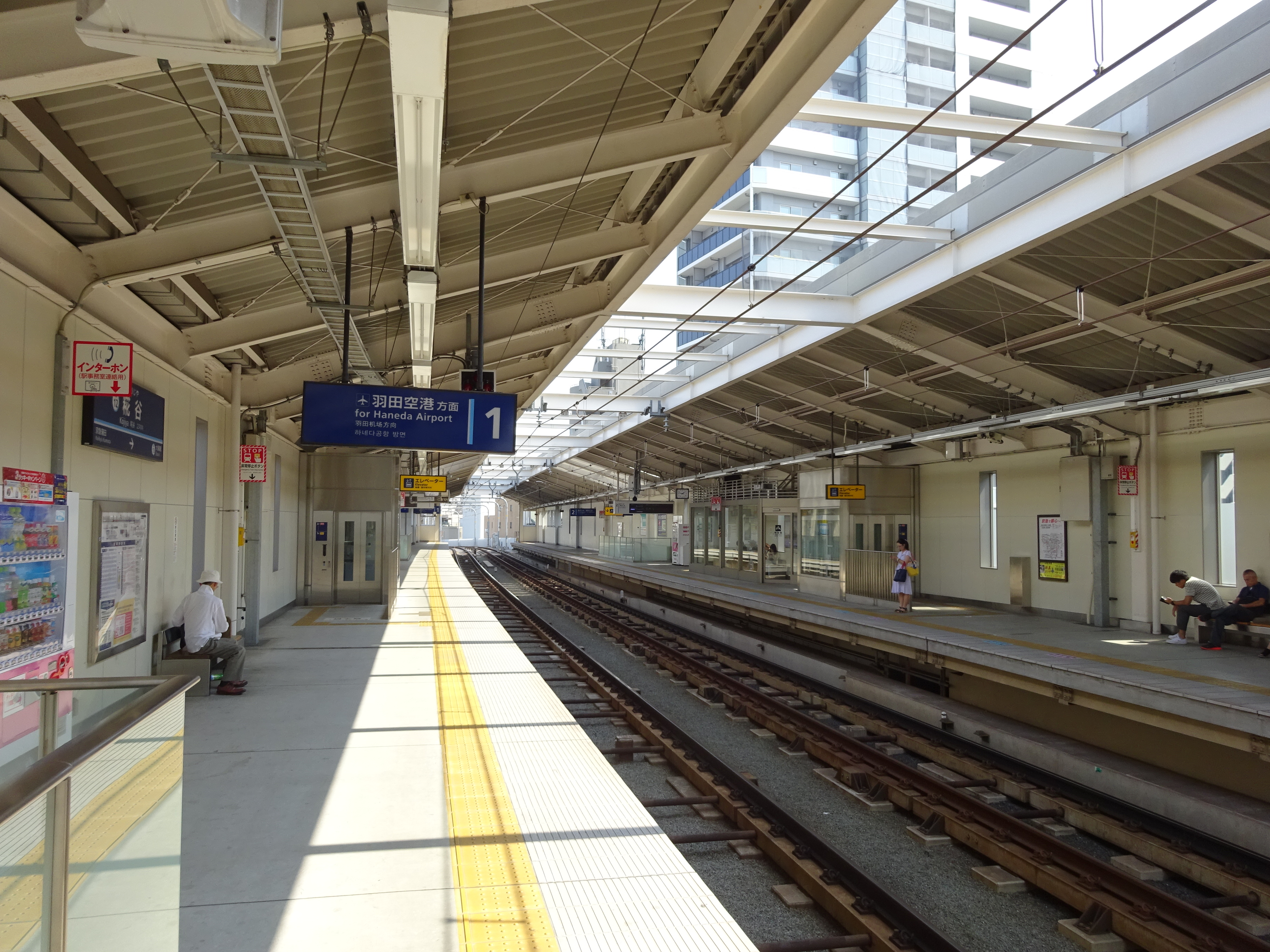
- The elevated platforms in 2016

General information
- Location: 4-13-19 Nishikojiya; Ōta, Tokyo; Japan
- Owner: Keikyu
- Line: Keikyū Airport Line
- Distance: 0.9 km from Keikyū Kamata
- Platforms: 2 side platforms
- Tracks: 2

Construction
- Structure type: Elevated
- Accessible: Yes

Other information
- Station code: KK12
- Website: Official website

History
- Opened: 28 June 1902
- Rebuilt: 1991-1993, 2005-2012

Passengers
- FY2011: 21,863 daily

Services
Preceding station	Keikyu	Following station
Ōtorii KK13 towards Haneda Airport Terminal 1·2	Airport Line Tokkyū Limited Express Express Local	Keikyū Kamata KK11 Terminus
Location
- Location within Japan

Kōjiya Station (糀谷駅, Kōjiya-eki) is a railway station on the Keikyū Airport Line in Ōta, Tokyo, Japan, operated by the private railway operator Keikyu. It is numbered "KK12".

== Lines ==
Kōjiya Station is served by the 6.5 km Keikyū Airport Line from Keikyū Kamata to Haneda Airport Domestic Terminal, and lies 0.9 km from Keikyu Kamata. Through services operate to and from the Keikyū Main Line.

== Layout ==
The station has two opposed side platforms serving two tracks on the second floor level. The station ticket barriers and facilities are on the ground floor level.

=== Platforms ===
1	Keikyū Airport Line	for Haneda Airport Terminal 1·2
2	Keikyū Airport Line	for Keikyū Kamata; Keikyū Main Line for Shinagawa and Sengakuji; Toei Asakusa Line for Shimbashi and Oshiage; Keisei Oshiage Line for Aoto; Keisei Main Line for Keisei Funabashi and Narita Airport; Hokusō Line for Inba-Nihon-Idai; Narita Sky Access Line for Narita Airport; Keikyū Main Line for Yokohama and Kanazawa-hakkei; Keikyū Zushi Line for Zushi·Hayama; Keikyū Kurihama Line for Keikyū Kurihama

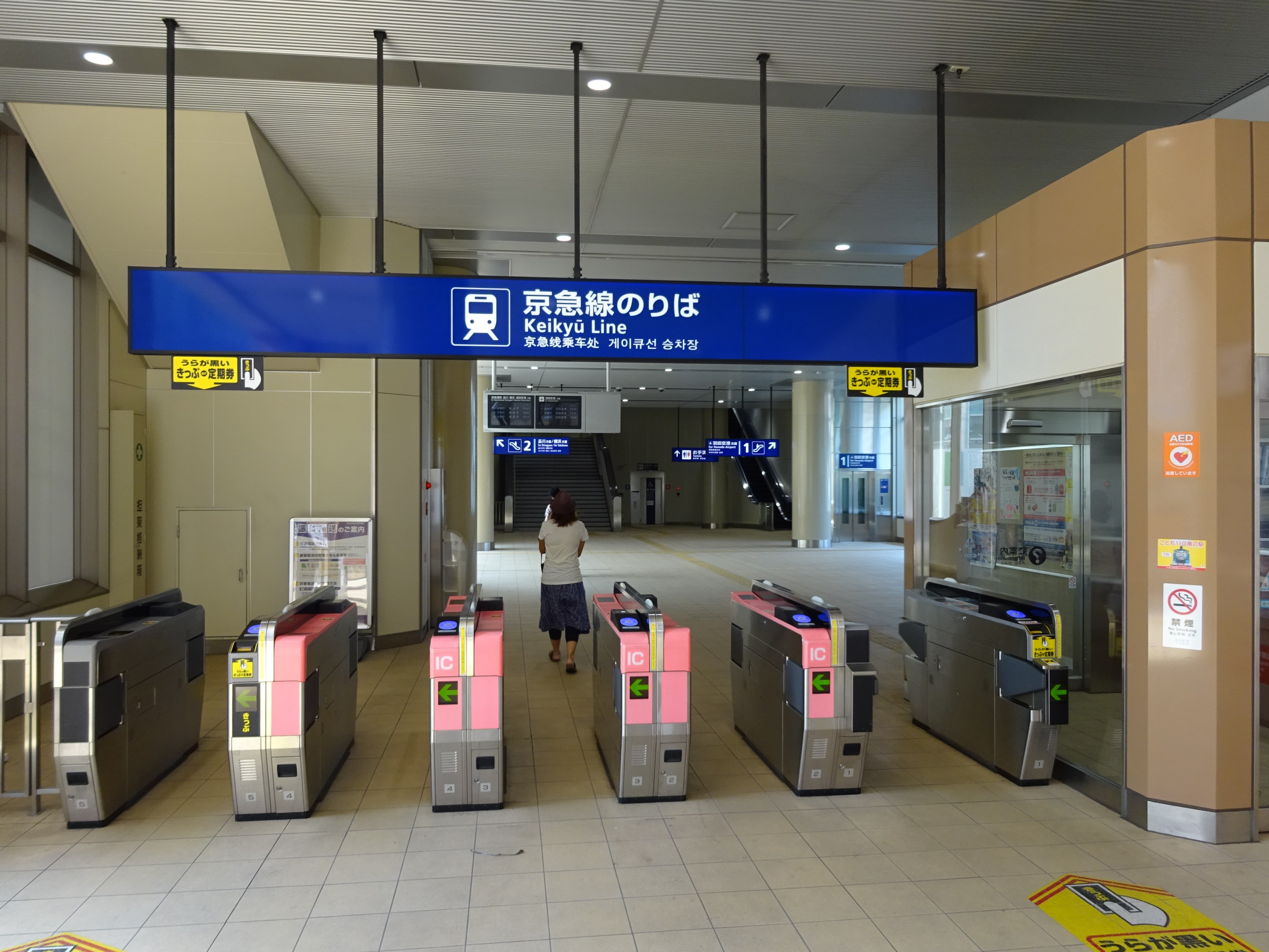
The ticket barriers in August 2016

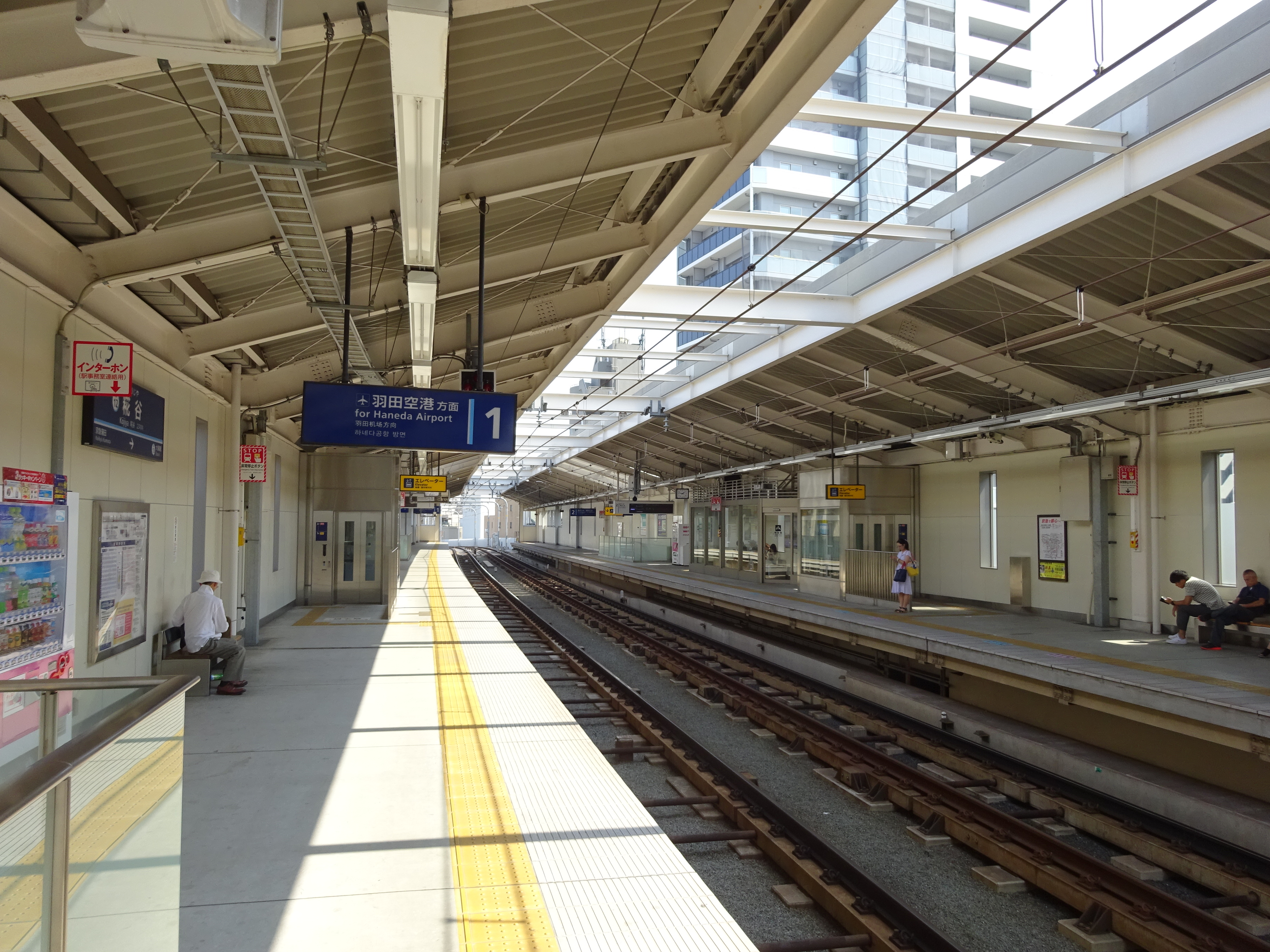
The platforms in August 2016

== History ==
The station opened on 28 June 1902, coinciding with the opening of the 3.6 km Haneda Branch Line from Kamata to Inaribashi Station (稲荷橋駅).

The station underwent modernization work between October 1991 and March 1993, with a new station building and extended and widened platforms. In December 1994, the platforms were extended to handle eight-car trains inter-running to and from the Toei Asakusa Line.

Keikyu introduced station numbering to its stations on 21 October 2010; Kōjiya was assigned station number KK11.

The station was rebuilt with elevated tracks, completed in October 2012.

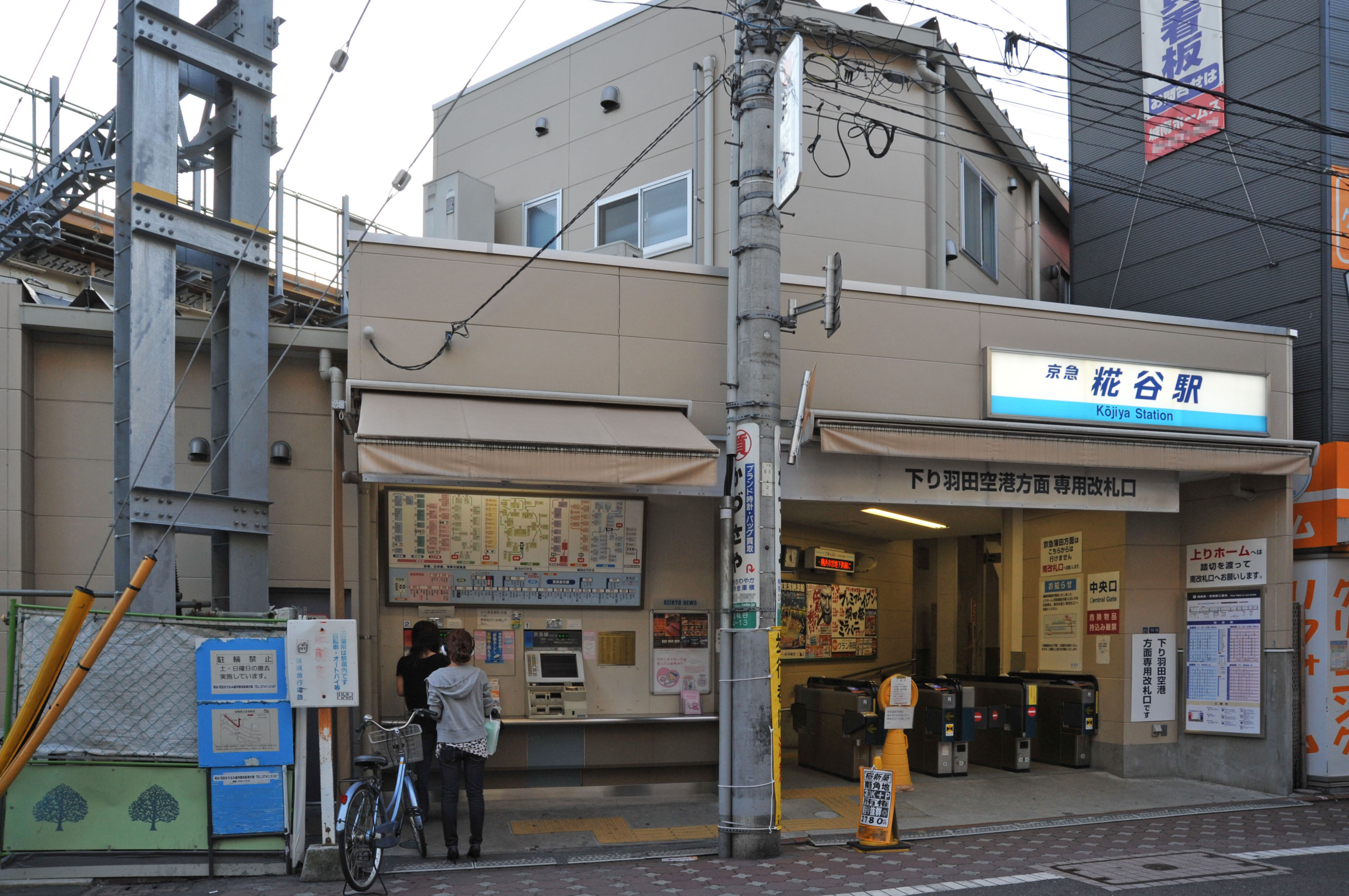
The entrance for the Haneda-bound platform in September 2009

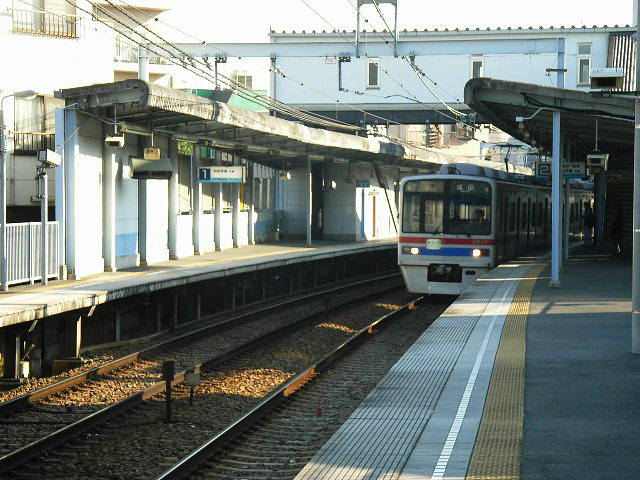
The ground-level platforms in December 2004

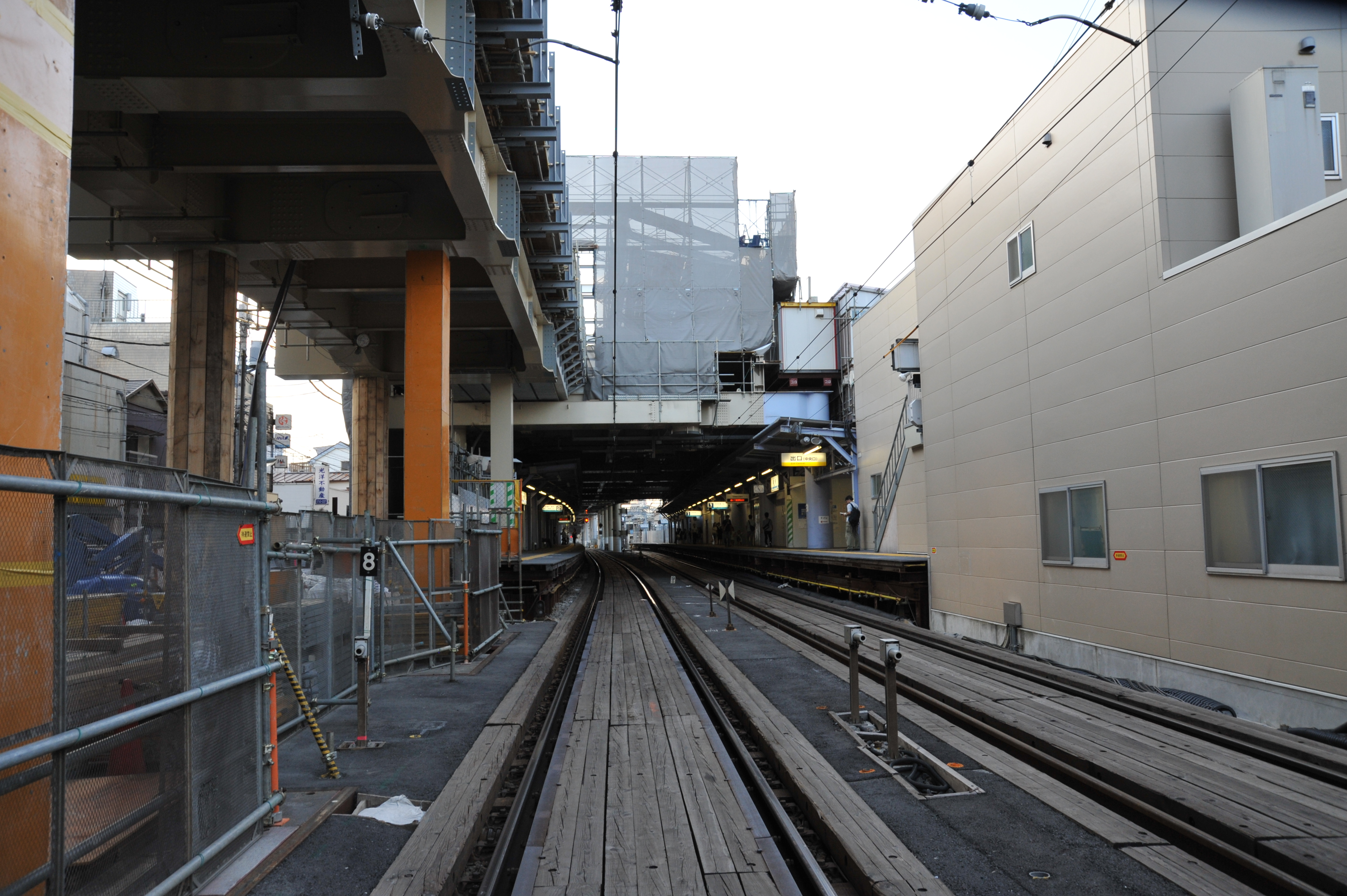
The ground-level platforms in September 2009 during construction work to raise them

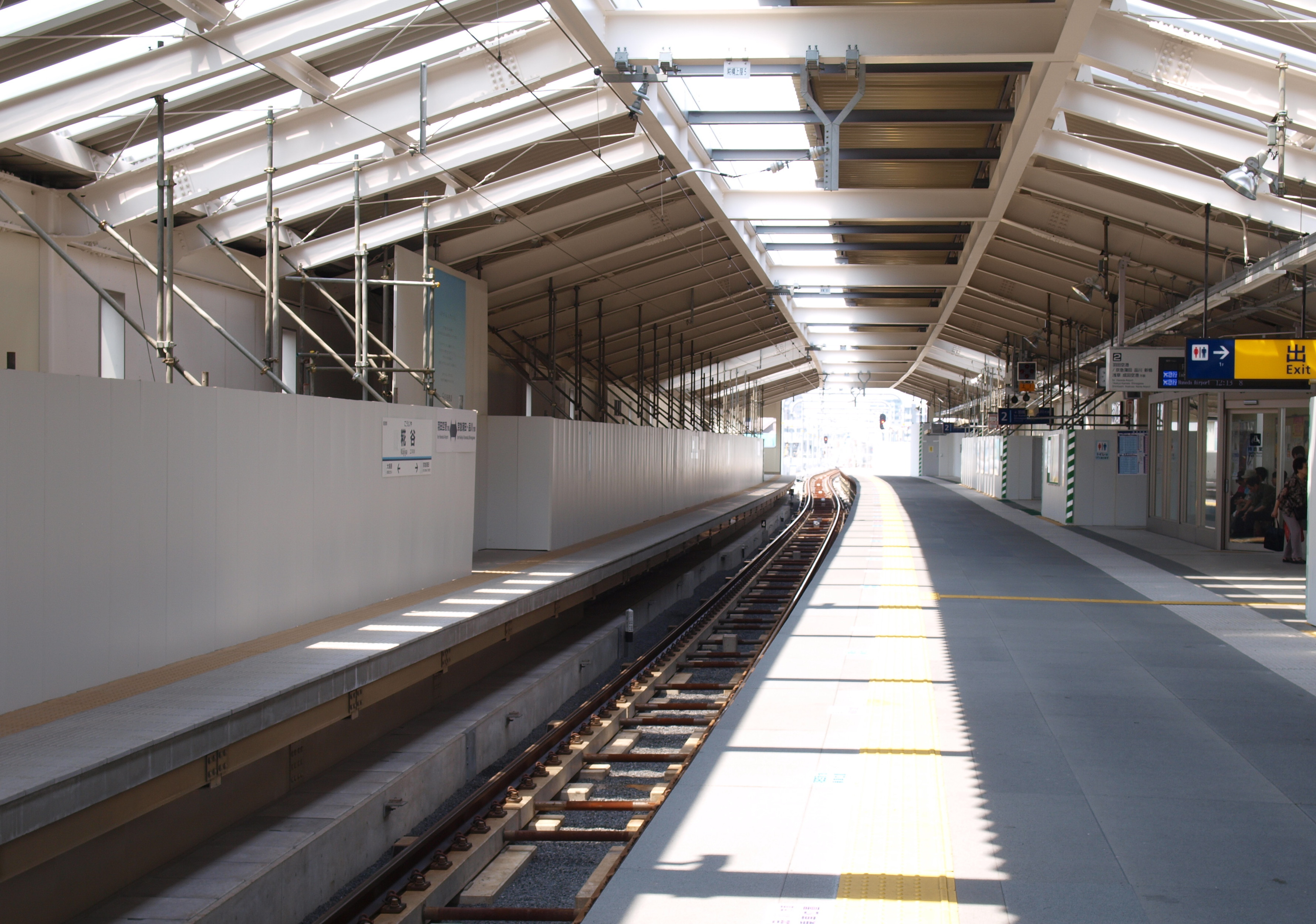
The elevated platform 2 in August 2010

== Passenger statistics ==
In fiscal 2011, the station was used by an average of 21,863 passengers daily.

== Surrounding area ==
- Kamata Girls' High School

== See also ==
- List of railway stations in Japan
