= Anamori-inari Station =

Railway station in Tokyo, Japan

KK14 Anamori-inari Station 穴守稲荷駅
- The station entrance in October 2026

General information
- Location: 4-6-11 Haneda; Ōta, Tokyo; Japan
- Coordinates: 35°33′02″N 139°44′48″E
- Owner: Keikyu
- Line: Keikyū Airport Line
- Distance: 2.6 km (1.6 mi) from Keikyū Kamata
- Platforms: 2 side platforms
- Tracks: 2

Construction
- Accessible: Yes

Other information
- Station code: KK14
- Website: Official website

History
- Opened: 28 June 1902

Services
Preceding station	Keikyu	Following station
Tenkūbashi KK15 towards Haneda Airport Terminal 1·2	Airport Line Tokkyū Limited Express Express Local	Ōtorii KK13 towards Keikyū Kamata
Location
- Location within Japan

Anamori-inari Station (穴守稲荷駅, Anamori-Inari-eki) is a railway station on the Keikyū Airport Line in Ōta, Tokyo, Japan, operated by the private railway operator Keikyu. Its station number is KK14.

== Lines ==
Anamori-inari Station is served by the Keikyū Airport Line.

== Station layout ==
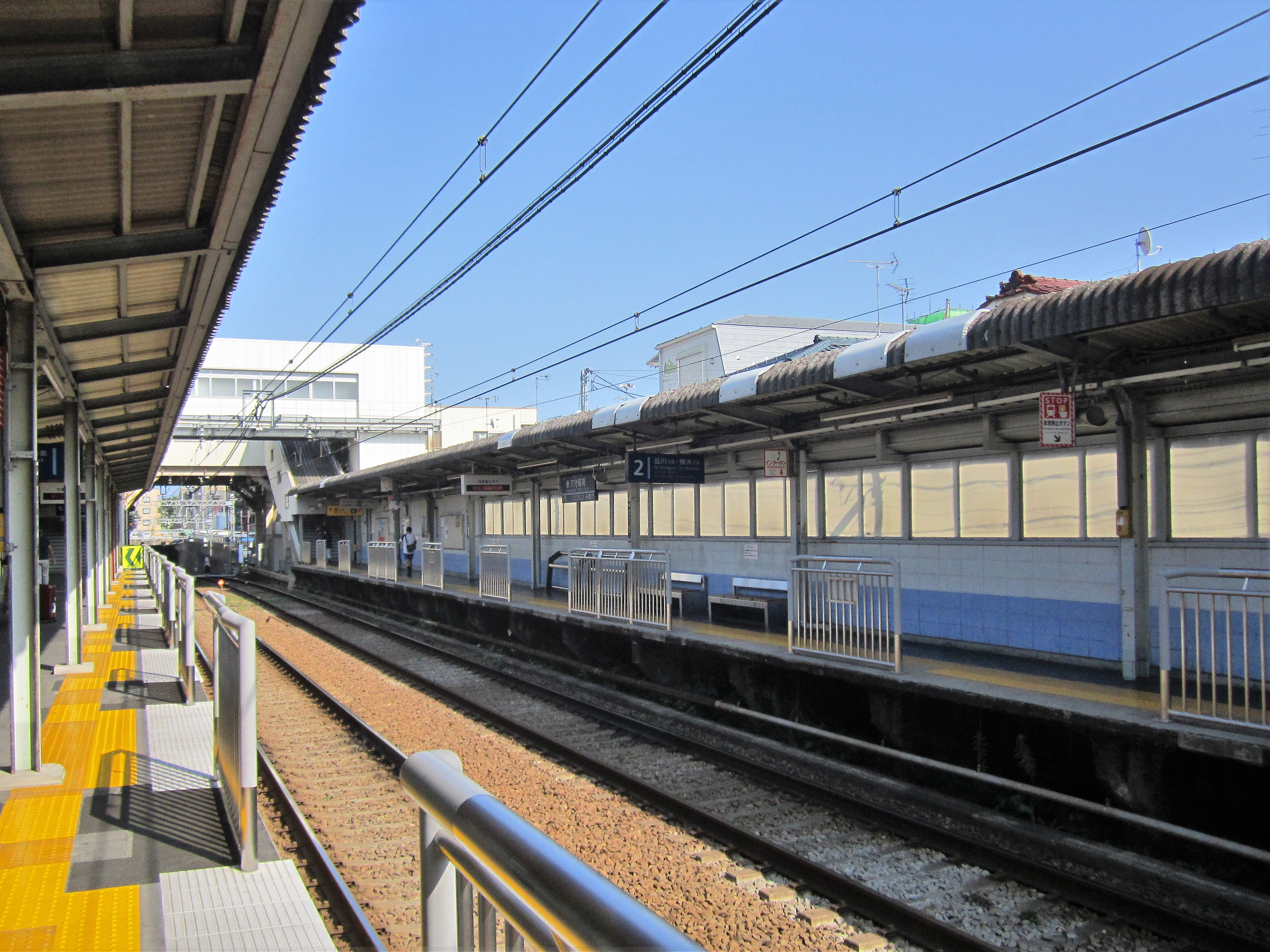
platform

This ground-level station consists of two side platforms serving two tracks.

=== Platforms ===
1	Keikyū Airport Line	for Haneda Airport Terminal 1·2
2	Keikyū Airport Line	for Keikyū Kamata; Keikyū Main Line for Shinagawa and Sengakuji; Toei Asakusa Line for Shimbashi and Oshiage; Keisei Oshiage Line for Aoto; Keisei Main Line for Keisei Funabashi and Narita Airport; Hokusō Line for Inba-Nihon-Idai; Narita Sky Access Line for Narita Airport; Keikyū Main Line for Yokohama and Kanazawa-hakkei; Keikyū Zushi Line for Zushi·Hayama; Keikyū Kurihama Line for Keikyū Kurihama

== History ==
The station opened on 28 June 1902.

Keikyu introduced station numbering to its stations on 21 October 2010; Anamoriinari was assigned station number KK14.

== See also ==
- List of railway stations in Japan
