= Keikyū Airport Line =

Railway line in Ōta, Tokyo, Japan

Airport Line

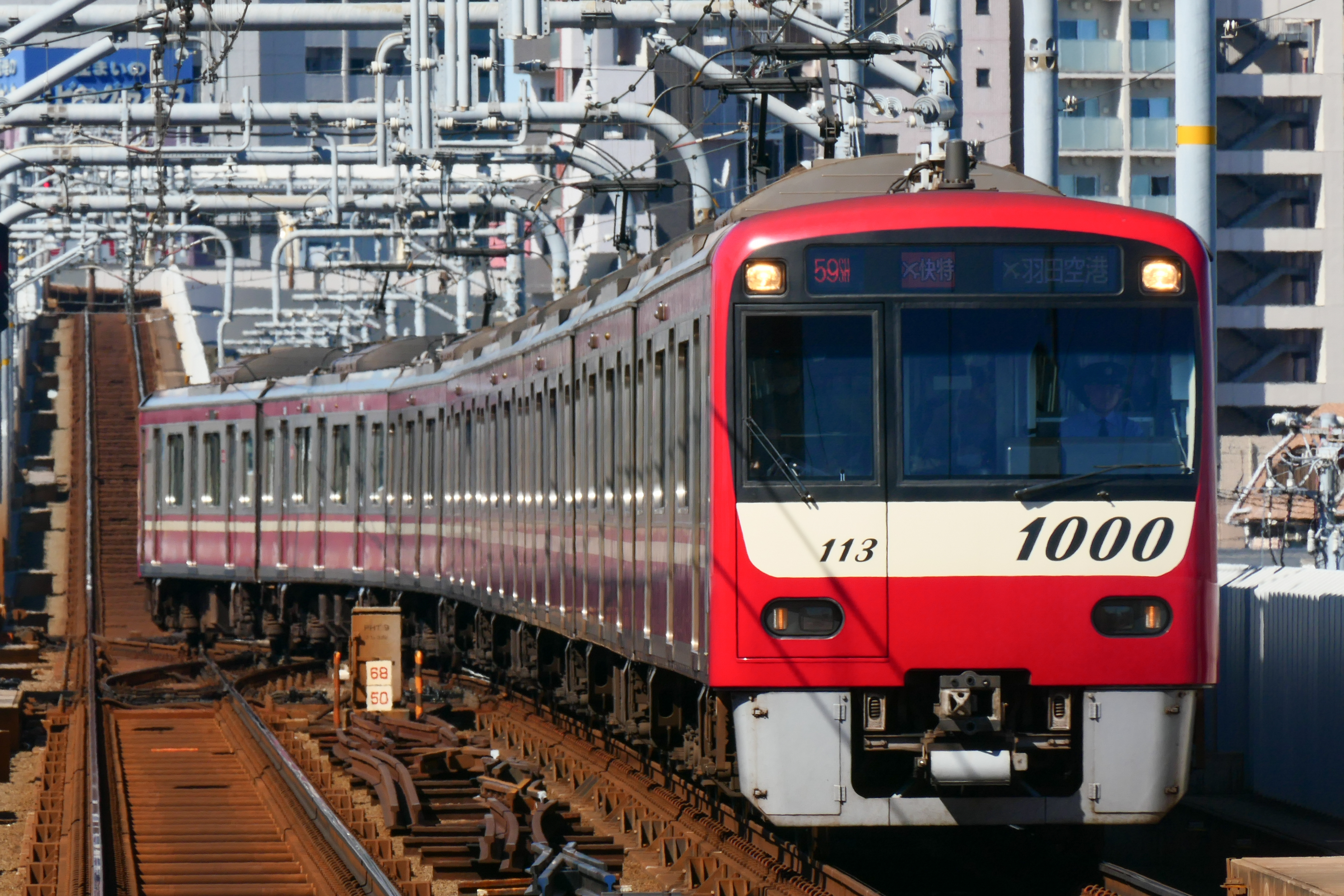
- A N1000 series approaching Kōjiya station

Overview
- Native name: 空港線
- Status: In service
- Owner: Keikyu Corporation
- Line number: KK
- Locale: Tokyo
- Termini: Haneda Airport Terminal 1·2; Keikyū Kamata
- Stations: 7

Service
- Type: Commuter rail
- System: Keikyu
- Operator: Keikyu Corporation

History
- Opened: 28 June 1902; 124 years ago

Technical
- Line length: 6.5 km (4.0 mi)
- Num of tracks: 2
- Track gauge: 1,435 mm (4 ft 8 1/2 in) standard gauge
- Old gauge: 4 ft 6 in (1,372 mm)
- Electrification: Overhead line, 1,500 V DC
- Operating speed: 110 km/h (70 mph)
- Signalling: Automatic closed block
- Train protection system: C-ATS

The Airport Line (Japanese: 空港線, Hepburn: Kūkō-sen) is a 6.5-kilometre (4.0 mi) private railway line in Japan, operated by Keikyū. The line runs between Keikyu Kamata and Haneda Airport Terminal 1·2 at Tokyo International Airport in Tokyo. Most trains continue beyond the Airport Line onto the Keikyū Main Line, operating northbound to Shinagawa in central Tokyo, with some services through-running onto the Toei Asakusa Line, or southbound to Yokohama, with select services continuing onward to Zushi-Hayama.

== Service types ==
Keikyu operates the following different types of service, including all-stations "Local" trains.

Abbreviations

- Lo – Local: (Note: 普通, Futsū) Stops at all stations
- Exp – Express (Note: 急行, Kyūkō)
- TLE – Tokkyū Limited Express
- KLE – Kaitoku Limited Express
- ALE – Airport Limited Express (Note: エアポート快特, Eapōto Kaitoku)

== Station list ==
All stations are located in Ota, Tokyo.

No.	Name	Distance in km (mi)	Express	Tokkyū Ltd. Exp.	Kaitoku Ltd. Exp.	Airport Ltd. Exp.	Transfers
KK11	Keikyū Kamata 京急蒲田	0 (0)	●	●	●	|	Main Line (KK11; through service)
KK12	Kōjiya 糀谷	0.9 (0.56)	●	●	|	|	
KK13	Ōtorii 大鳥居	1.9 (1.2)	●	●	|	|	
KK14	Anamori-inari 穴守稲荷	2.6 (1.6)	●	●	|	|	
KK15	Tenkūbashi 天空橋	3.3 (2.1)	●	●	|	|	Haneda Airport Line (MO07)
KK16	Haneda Airport Terminal 3 羽田空港第3ターミナル	4.5 (2.8)	●	●	●	●	Haneda Airport Line (MO08)
KK17	Haneda Airport Terminal 1·2 羽田空港第1・第2ターミナル	6.5 (4.0)	●	●	●	●	Haneda Airport Line (MO10, MO11)

== History ==
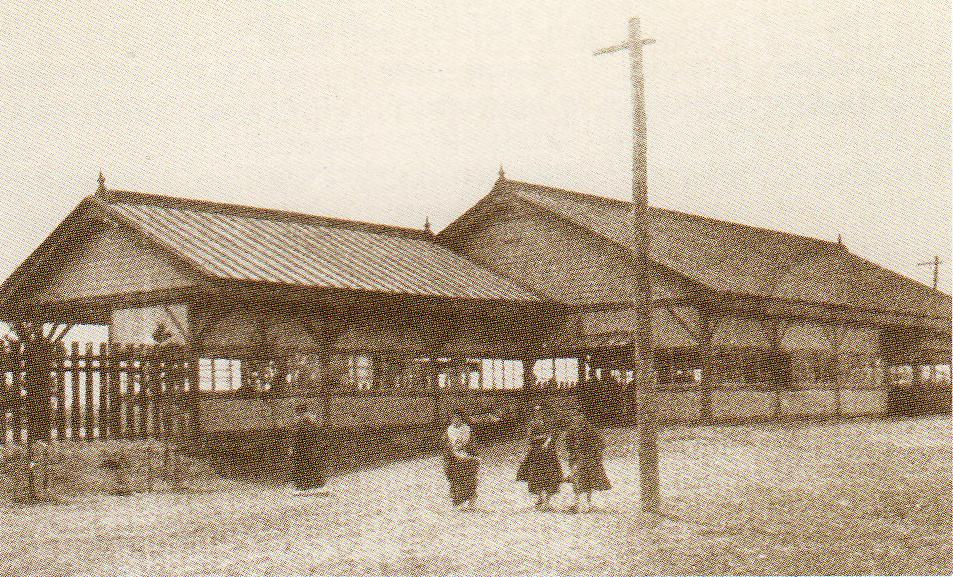
Anamori Station (demolished in 1945)

On 28 June 1902, the Keihin Railway opened the 1,435 mm (4 ft 8 1/2 in) Anamori Line from Kamata to Anamori Station (穴守駅), located near the present-day site of Tenkūbashi Station. The line was electrified at 600 V DC. In 1904, the line was regauged to 1,372 mm (4 ft 6 in) in conjunction with the Keikyu Main Line, and the entire route was double-tracked by 1910.

The line was constructed primarily to serve visitors to Anamori Inari Shrine, located in front of Anamori Station. To increase ridership, Keihin Railway developed leisure facilities in the surrounding area, including a baseball park, tennis courts, a swimming pool, and an amusement park. In 1931, Haneda Airport opened approximately 500 m (1,600 ft) north of Anamori Station.

The Anamori Line became the primary rail route to Haneda Airport until 1945, when the airport was taken over by the United States Armed Forces. The line was subsequently reduced to single track to accommodate a parallel freight line. On 1 November 1963, it was renamed the Airport Line. Despite this designation, the line was not widely used for airport access due to limited service frequency and the absence of through services to central Tokyo, particularly after the opening of the Tokyo Monorail in 1964, which provided direct service from Hamamatsuchō to the airport terminal.

Rail service to the airport island resumed in April 1993, when the line was extended across the river to a new Haneda Airport Station at the present-day site of Tenkūbashi Station. That year, Haneda Airport underwent significant expansion with the opening of a new terminal, and Keikyu received government approval to serve the facility after the monorail was deemed to have insufficient capacity. On 18 November 1998, the Airport Line was further extended from Tenkūbashi to Haneda Airport Station (now Haneda Airport Terminal 1·2 Station), enabling direct services between the airport and major stations such as Shinagawa and Yokohama. An infill station serving the International Terminal, named Haneda Airport International Terminal Station (now Haneda Airport Terminal 3 Station), opened on 21 October 2010.

=== Future plans ===
Service levels are expected to increase following the completion of tail tracks at Haneda Airport Terminal 1·2 Station.

== See also ==
- List of railway lines in Japan
