= Haneda Airport Terminal 3 Station =

Railway and monorail station in Tokyo, Japan

KK16 MO08 Haneda Airport Terminal 3 Station 羽田空港第3ターミナル駅
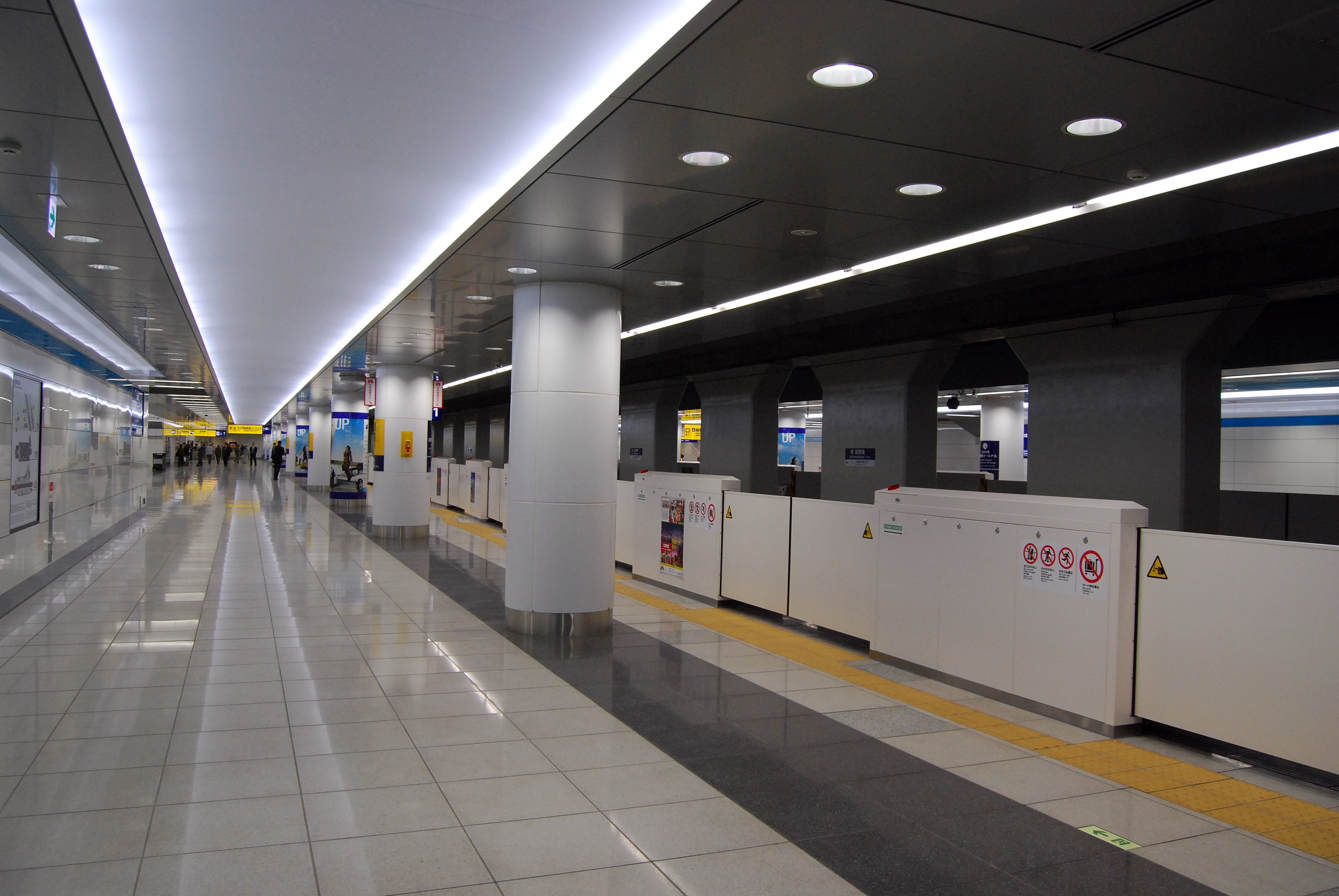
- The Keikyu platforms

General information
- Location: 2-6-5 Haneda Kūkō; Ōta, Tokyo; Japan
- Coordinates: 35°32′42″N 139°46′04″E
- Operator: Keikyu; Tokyo Monorail
- Lines: Keikyū Airport Line; Tokyo Monorail Haneda Airport Line
- Platforms: 4 side platforms
- Tracks: 4
- Connections: Haneda Airport

Construction
- Structure type: Underground (Keikyu Airport Line); Elevated (Tokyo Monorail)
- Accessible: Yes

Other information
- Station code: KK16, MO-08
- IATA code: HND

History
- Opened: 21 October 2010; 15 years ago
- Former names: Haneda Airport International Terminal Station

Services
| Preceding station | Keikyu | Following station |
|---|---|---|
| Haneda Airport Terminal 1·2 KK17 Terminus | Airport Line Airport Limited Express via Main Line | Shinagawa KK01 towards Sengakuji |
| Haneda Airport Terminal 1·2 KK17 Terminus | Airport Line Kaitoku Limited Express | Keikyū Kamata KK11 Terminus |
| Haneda Airport Terminal 1·2 KK17 Terminus | Airport Line Tokkyū Limited Express Express Local | Tenkūbashi KK15 towards Keikyū Kamata |
| Preceding station | Tokyo Monorail | Following station |
| Monorail Hamamatsuchō MO01 Terminus | Haneda Airport Line Haneda Express | Haneda Airport Terminal 1 MO10 towards Haneda Airport Terminal 2 |
| Ryūtsū Center MO04 towards Monorail Hamamatsuchō | Haneda Airport Line Rapid | Haneda Airport Terminal 1 MO10 towards Haneda Airport Terminal 2 |
| Tenkūbashi MO07 towards Monorail Hamamatsuchō | Haneda Airport Line Local | Shin Seibijō MO09 towards Haneda Airport Terminal 2 |
Location
- Location within Special wards of Tokyo Location within Tokyo Location within Japan

Haneda Airport Terminal 3 Station (羽田空港第3ターミナル駅, Haneda-kūkō Dai-san Tāminaru eki) is a railway station at Tokyo International Airport in Ōta, Tokyo, Japan. The station is operated by the private railway operator Keikyu and Tokyo Monorail. The station opened on October 21, 2010.

== Lines ==
- Tokyo Monorail Haneda Airport Line
- Keikyū Airport Line

Haneda Airport Terminal 3 Station is served by the 17.8 km (11.1 mi) Tokyo Monorail Haneda Airport Line from Monorail Hamamatsuchō in central Tokyo to Haneda Airport Terminal 2, and lies 14.0 km (8.7 mi) from the northern terminus of the line at Monorail Hamamatsuchō.

== Station layout ==
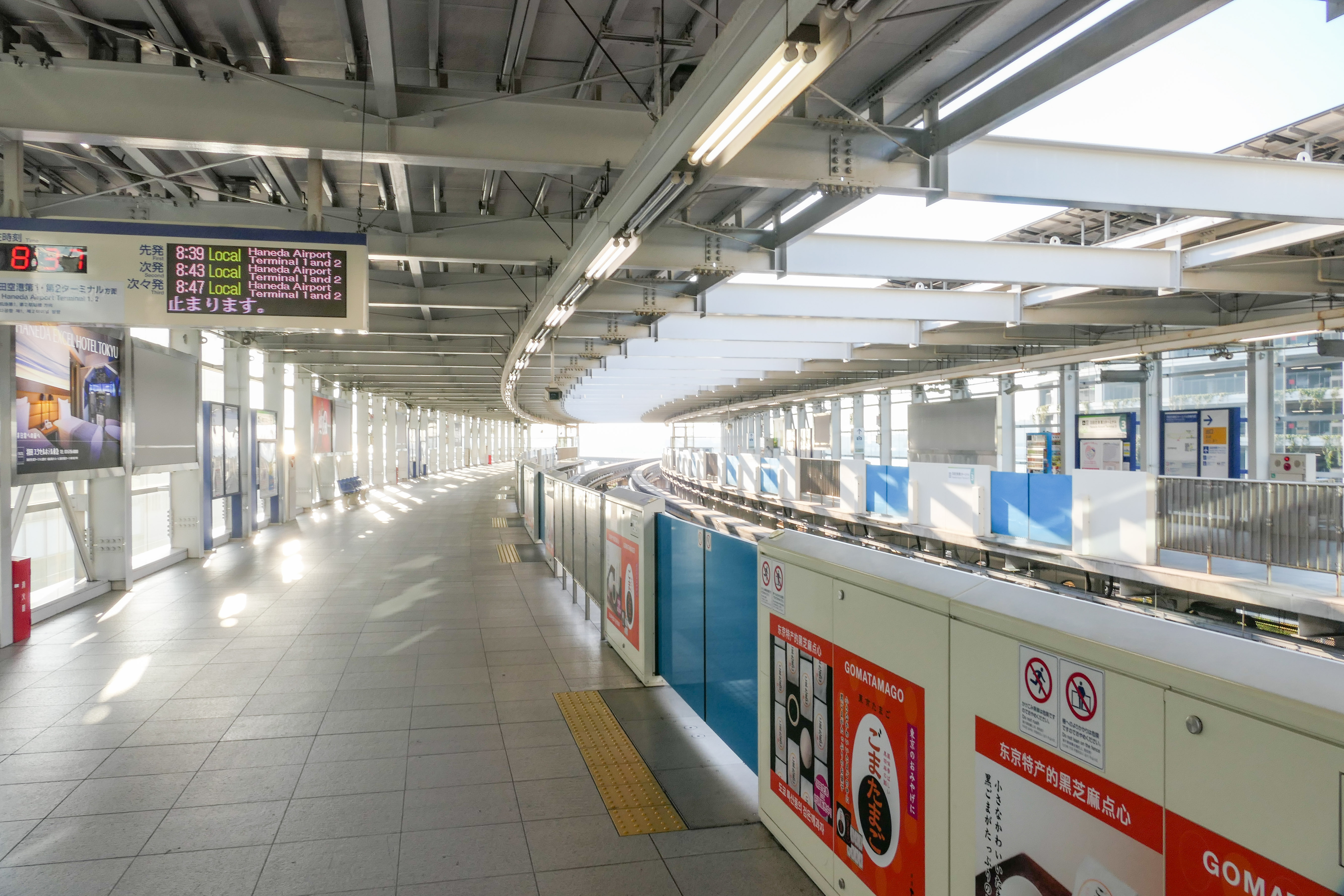
Tokyo Monorail Haneda Airport Line

The Keikyu platforms are located underground with elevators and escalators to carry passengers to the arrival and departure levels of Terminal 3. The Keikyu platforms consist of two side platforms serving two tracks. The Tokyo Monorail platforms are located above ground, connected to the third floor of the terminal building.

=== Keikyu platforms ===
The Keikyū Airport Line platforms are underground.

| 1 | Keikyu Airport Line | for Haneda Airport Terminal 1·2 |
| 2 | Keikyū Airport Line | for Keikyū Kamata; Keikyū Main Line for Shinagawa and Sengakuji; Toei Asakusa Line for Shimbashi and Oshiage; Keisei Oshiage Line for Aoto; Keisei Main Line for Keisei Funabashi and Narita Airport; Hokusō Line for Inba-Nihon-Idai; Narita Sky Access Line for Narita Airport; Keikyū Main Line for Yokohama and Kanazawa-hakkei; Keikyū Zushi Line for Zushi·Hayama; Keikyū Kurihama Line for Keikyū Kurihama |

=== Tokyo Monorail platforms ===
The Tokyo Monorail platforms are elevated and located on the third floor.

| 1 | Tokyo Monorail Haneda Airport Line | for Haneda Airport Terminal 1 and Haneda Airport Terminal 2 |
| 2 | Tokyo Monorail Haneda Airport Line | for Monorail Hamamatsuchō |

== History ==
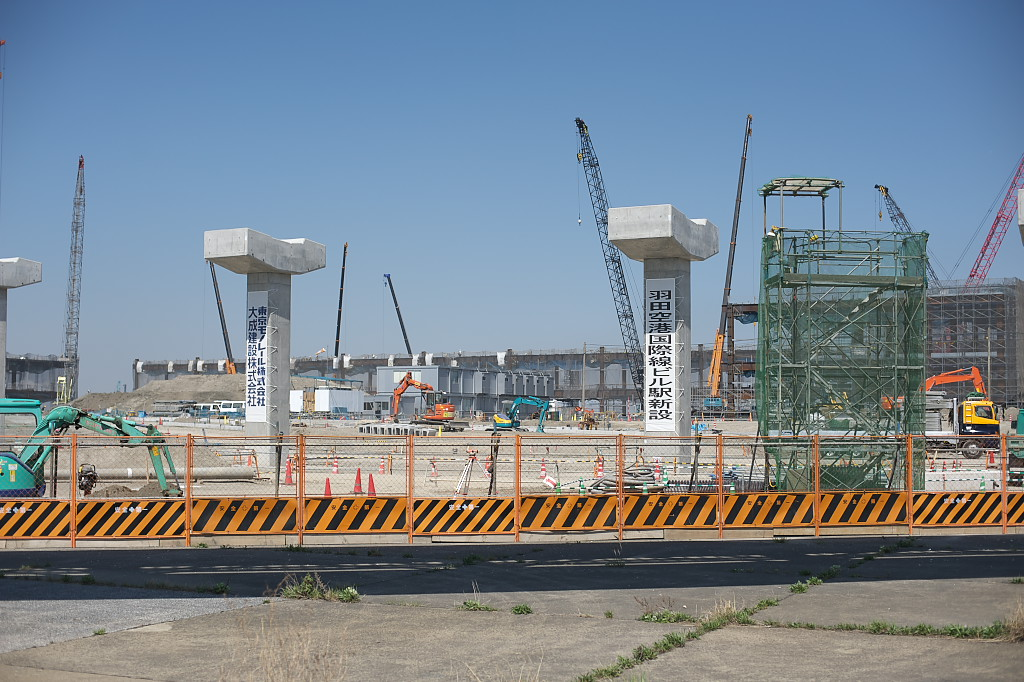
Monorail piers for new route for Haneda Airport International Terminal Station

The station opened on 21 October 2010 as Haneda Airport International Terminal Station. At the time, two operators used different names for the station in Japanese:

- Keikyu: Haneda Kūkō Kokusaisen Tāminaru Eki (羽田空港国際線ターミナル駅)
- Tokyo Monorail: Haneda Kūkō Kokusaisen Biru Eki (羽田空港国際線ビル駅)

The station's provisional Japanese name was Kokusai tāminaru eki (国際ターミナル駅) in Keikyu documents and Kokusaisen tāminaru eki (国際線ターミナル駅) in Tokyo Monorail documents.

On 27 March 2010, there was a fire in the station building under construction that burnt an area of approximately 700 square meters (7,500 sq ft) and injured one worker.

Keikyu introduced station numbering to its stations on 21 October 2010; Haneda Airport International Terminal Station was assigned station number KK16.

On 14 March 2020, both the Tokyo Monorail and Keikyū stations were renamed to Haneda Airport Terminal 3 Station to coincide with the change in the names of Haneda's terminal buildings.

== Passenger statistics ==
In fiscal 2011, the Tokyo Monorail station was used by an average of 6,467 passengers daily.

== See also ==
- List of railway stations in Japan
