= Haneda Airport Terminal 1 Station =

Monorail station in Tokyo, Japan

MO10 Haneda Airport Terminal 1 Station 羽田空港第1ターミナル駅
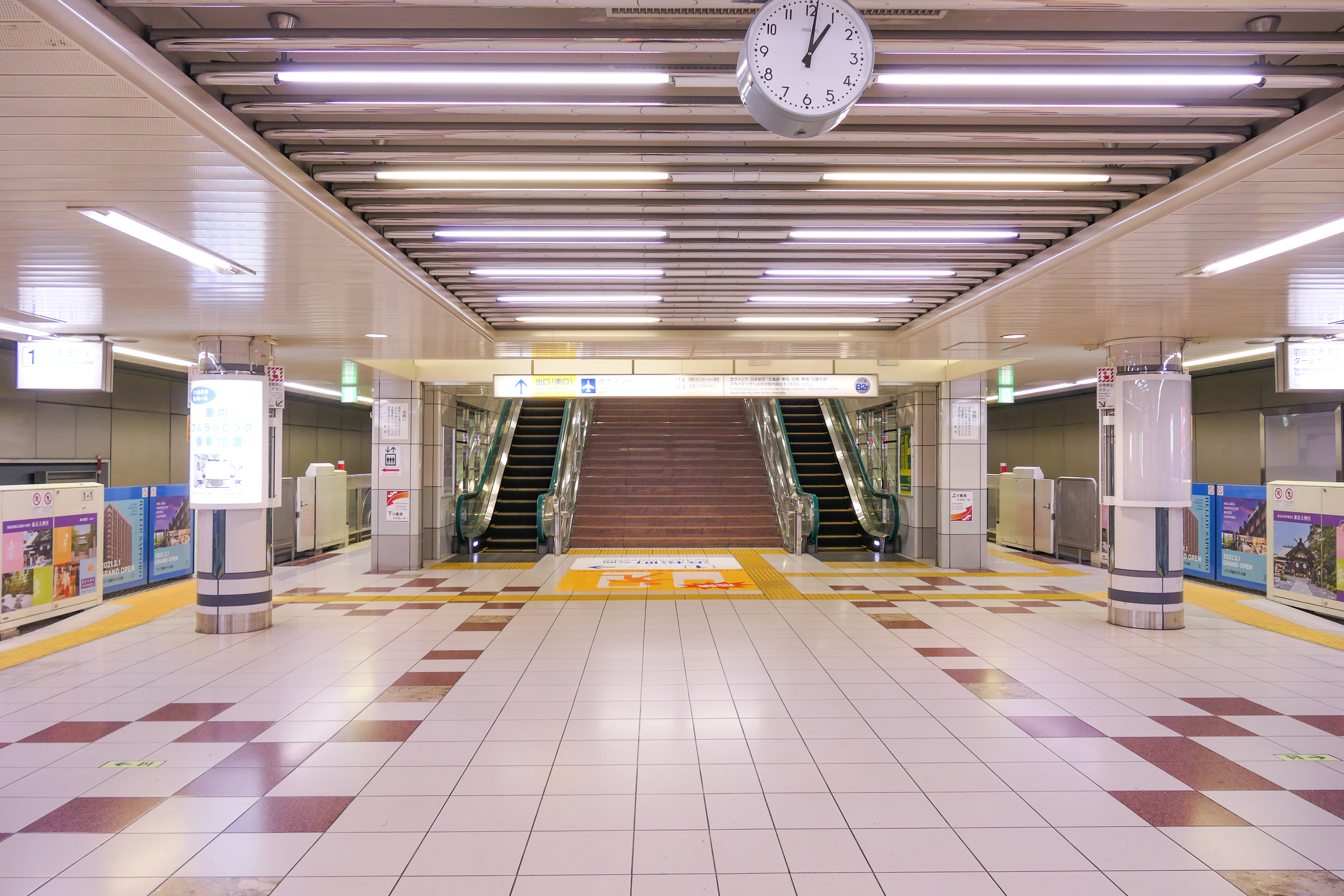
- The platforms in September 2021

General information
- Location: 3-3-2 Haneda Kūkō, Ōta-ku, Tokyo; Japan
- Coordinates: 35°32′57″N 139°47′05″E
- Operator: Tokyo Monorail
- Line: Tokyo Monorail Haneda Airport Line
- Platforms: 1 island platform
- Tracks: 2
- Connections: Bus stop; Haneda Airport

Construction
- Structure type: Underground

Other information
- Station code: MO10
- IATA code: HND

History
- Opened: 27 September 1993; 32 years ago
- Former names: Haneda Airport (until 2004)

Passengers
- FY2011: 27,005 daily

Services
Preceding station	Tokyo Monorail	Following station
Haneda Airport Terminal 3 MO08 towards Monorail Hamamatsuchō	Haneda Airport Line Haneda Express Rapid	Haneda Airport Terminal 2 MO11 Terminus
Shin Seibijō MO09 towards Monorail Hamamatsuchō	Haneda Airport Line Local	Haneda Airport Terminal 2 MO11 Terminus
Location
- Location within Special wards of Tokyo Location within Tokyo Location within Japan

Haneda Airport Terminal 1 Station (羽田空港第1ターミナル駅, Haneda-Kūkō-Daiichi-Tāminaru-eki) is a station on the Tokyo Monorail in Ōta, Tokyo, Japan, serving Haneda Airport.

== Lines ==
Haneda Airport Terminal 1 Station is served by the 17.8 km (11.1 mi) Tokyo Monorail Haneda Airport Line from Monorail Hamamatsuchō in central Tokyo to Haneda Airport Terminal 2, and lies 16.9 km (10.5 mi) from the northern terminus of the line at Monorail Hamamatsuchō.

== Station layout ==
The station is an underground station with one island platform, fitted with waist-high platform screen doors. It is located below the Terminal 1 Building of Haneda Airport.

=== Platforms ===
1	■ Tokyo Monorail Haneda Airport Line	for Monorail Hamamatsuchō
2	■ Tokyo Monorail Haneda Airport Line	for Haneda Airport Terminal 2

== History ==
The station opened on 27 September 1993 as Haneda Airport Station (羽田空港駅, Haneda-Kūkō Eki). It was renamed Haneda Airport Terminal 1 Station on 1 December 2004 after the opening of Haneda Airport Terminal 2 Station, with its Japanese name written as Haneda-Kūkō-Daiichi-Biru-eki (Japanese: 羽田空港第1ビル駅). From 14 March 2020, it was renamed as Haneda-Kūkō-Daiichi-Tāminaru-eki (Japanese: 羽田空港第1ターミナル駅) but retains the same English name.

== Passenger statistics ==
In fiscal 2011, the station was used by an average of 27,005 passengers daily.

== Surrounding area ==
- Haneda Airport Terminal 1·2 Station (Keikyu Airport Line)
