= Haneda Airport Terminal 2 Station =

Monorail station in Tokyo, Japan

Coordinates: 35°33′03″N 139°47′18″E

MO11 Haneda Airport Terminal 2 羽田空港第2ターミナル駅
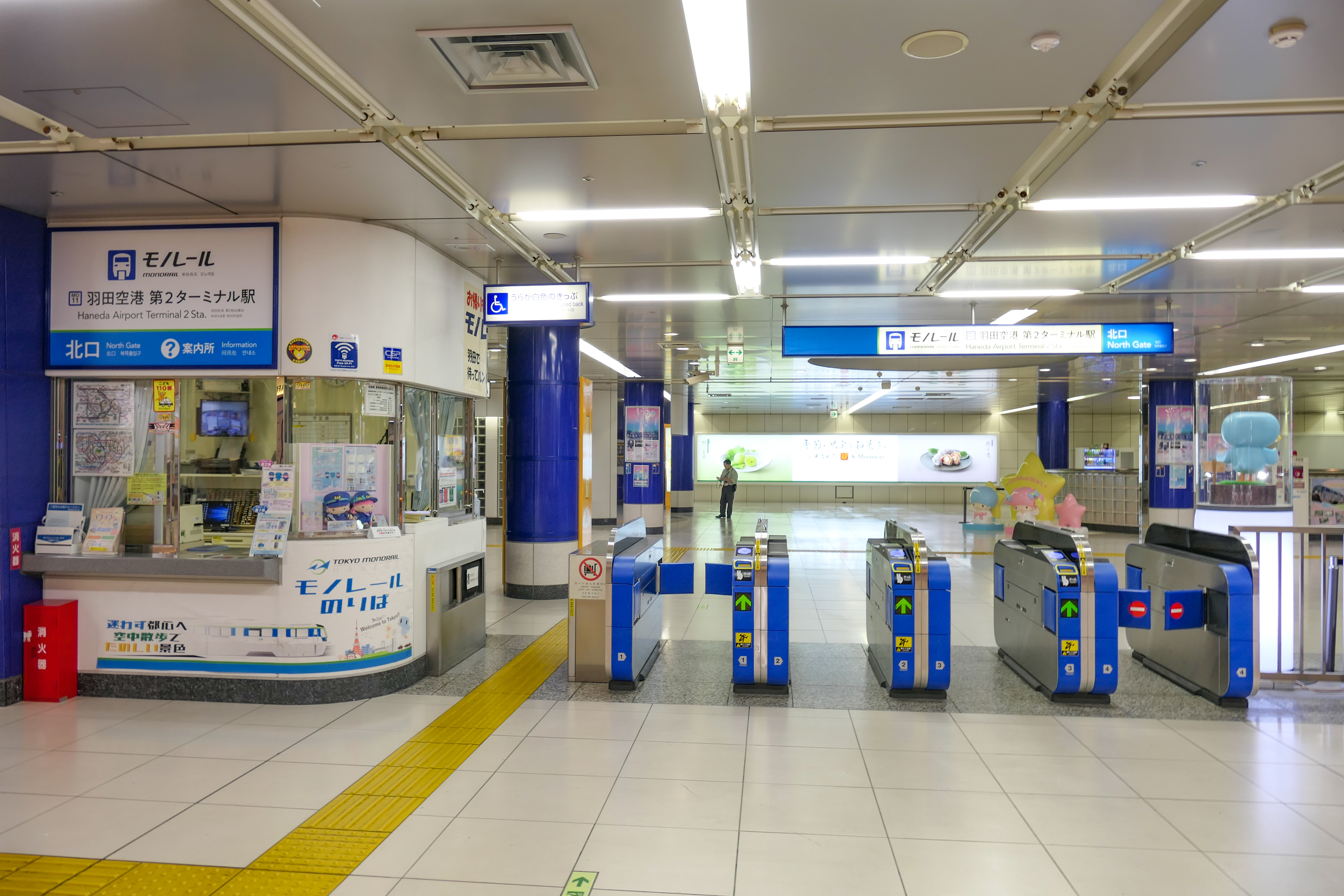
- The station entrance in September 2021

General information
- Location: 3-4-2 Haneda Kūkō; Ōta, Tokyo; Japan
- Operator: Tokyo Monorail Co., Ltd.
- Distance: 17.8 km (11.1 mi) from Hamamatsuchō
- Platforms: 2 island platforms
- Tracks: 3
- Connections: Haneda Airport; Keikyū Airport Line (Haneda Airport Terminal 1·2: KK17); Bus stop

Construction
- Structure type: Underground
- Accessible: Yes

Other information
- Station code: MO11
- IATA code: HND

History
- Opened: 1 December 2004; 21 years ago

Passengers
- FY2011: 32,001 daily

Services
Preceding station	Tokyo Monorail	Following station
Haneda Airport Terminal 1 MO10 towards Monorail Hamamatsuchō	Haneda Airport Line Haneda Express Rapid Local	Terminus
Location
- Location within Special wards of Tokyo Location within Tokyo Location within Japan

Haneda Airport Terminal 2 station (Japanese: 羽田空港第2ターミナル駅, Hepburn: Haneda-Kūkō-Daini-Tāminaru-eki) is a station on the Tokyo Monorail in Ōta, Tokyo, Japan, serving Haneda Airport.

== Lines ==
Haneda Airport Terminal 2 station is the terminus of the 17.8 km (11.1 mi) Tokyo Monorail Haneda Airport Line from Monorail Hamamatsuchō in central Tokyo.

== Station layout ==
The station is located underground beneath Haneda Airport's Terminal 2 building. It has two island platforms and three tracks, although only one platform and two tracks are currently in use. Chest-height platform edge doors are installed only on the active platform, while the second platform and its adjoining track remain unused.

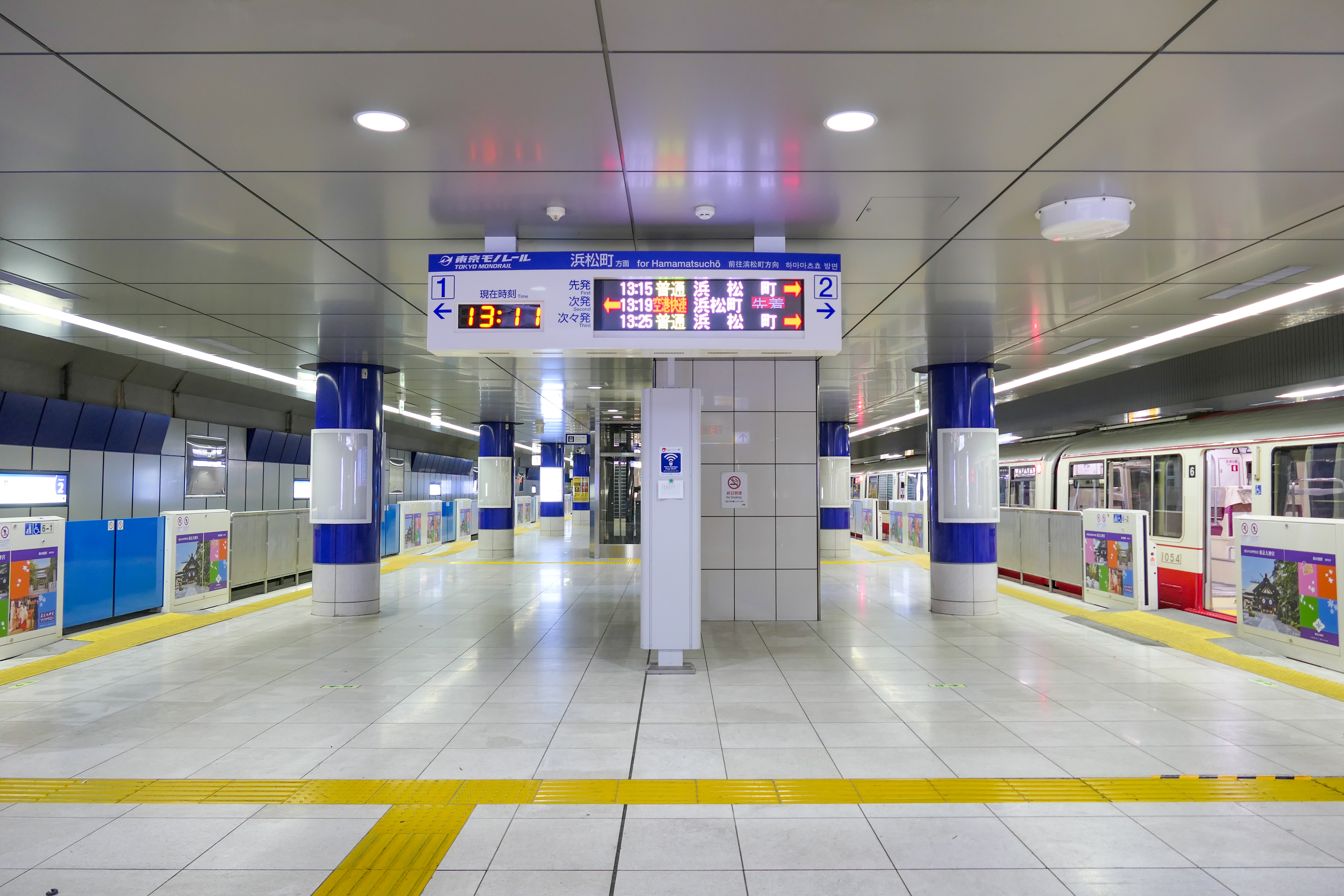
Platforms 1 and 2 in September 2021

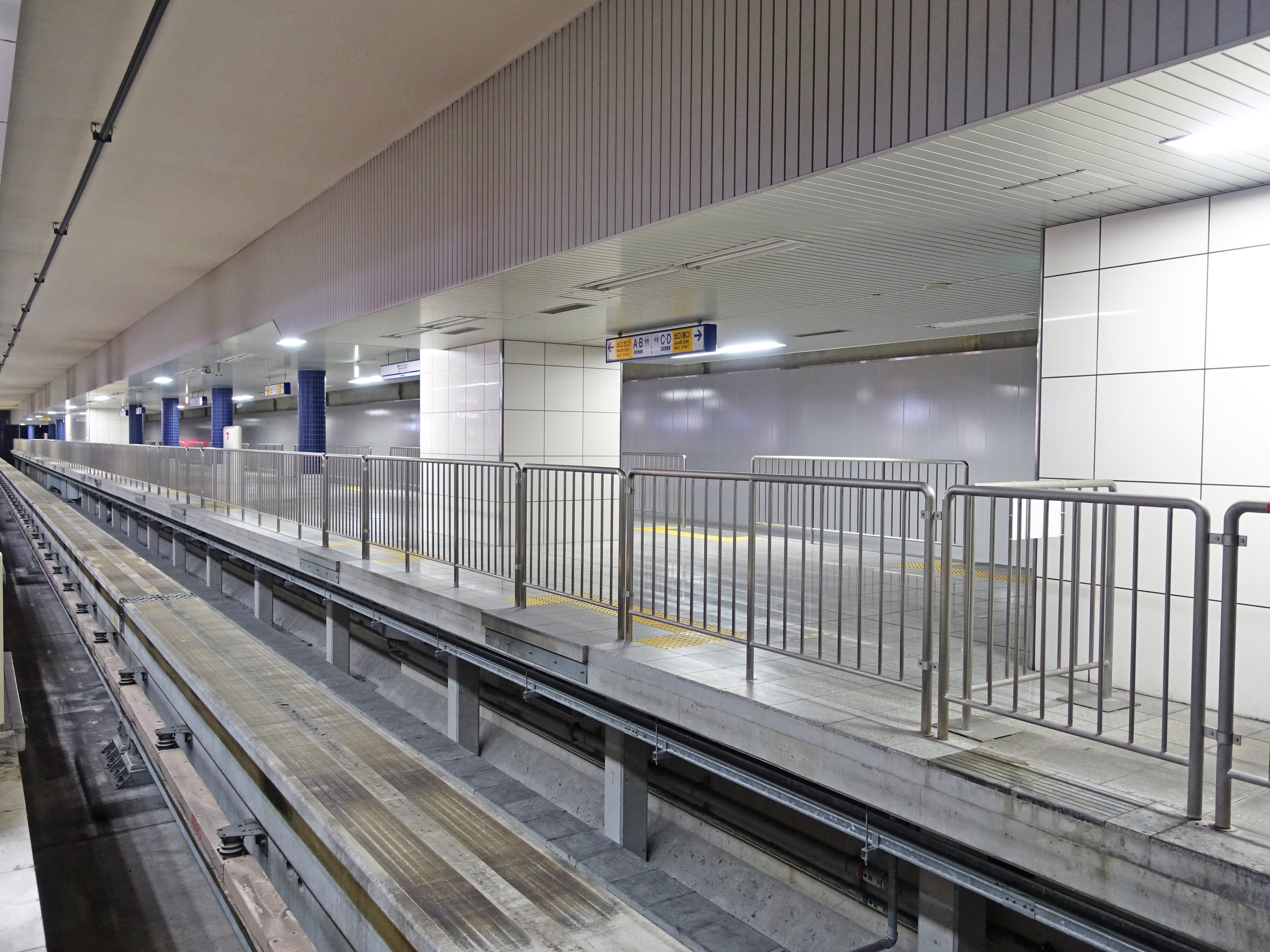
The unused island platform adjacent to platform 2 in March 2015

== History ==
The station was opened on 1 December 2004 in collaboration with the opening of Terminal 2, with its Japanese name written as Haneda-Kūkō-Daini-Biru-eki (Japanese: 羽田空港第2ビル駅). From 14 March 2020, it was renamed as Haneda-Kūkō-Daini-Tāminaru-eki (Japanese: 羽田空港第2ターミナル駅) but retains the same English name.

== Passenger statistics ==
In fiscal 2011, the station was used by an average of 32,001 passengers daily.

== Surrounding area ==
- Haneda Airport Terminal 1·2 Station (Keikyu Airport Line)

== See also ==
- List of railway stations in Japan
