= Keikyū Kamata Station =

Railway station in Tokyo, Japan

KK11 Keikyū Kamata Station 京急蒲田駅
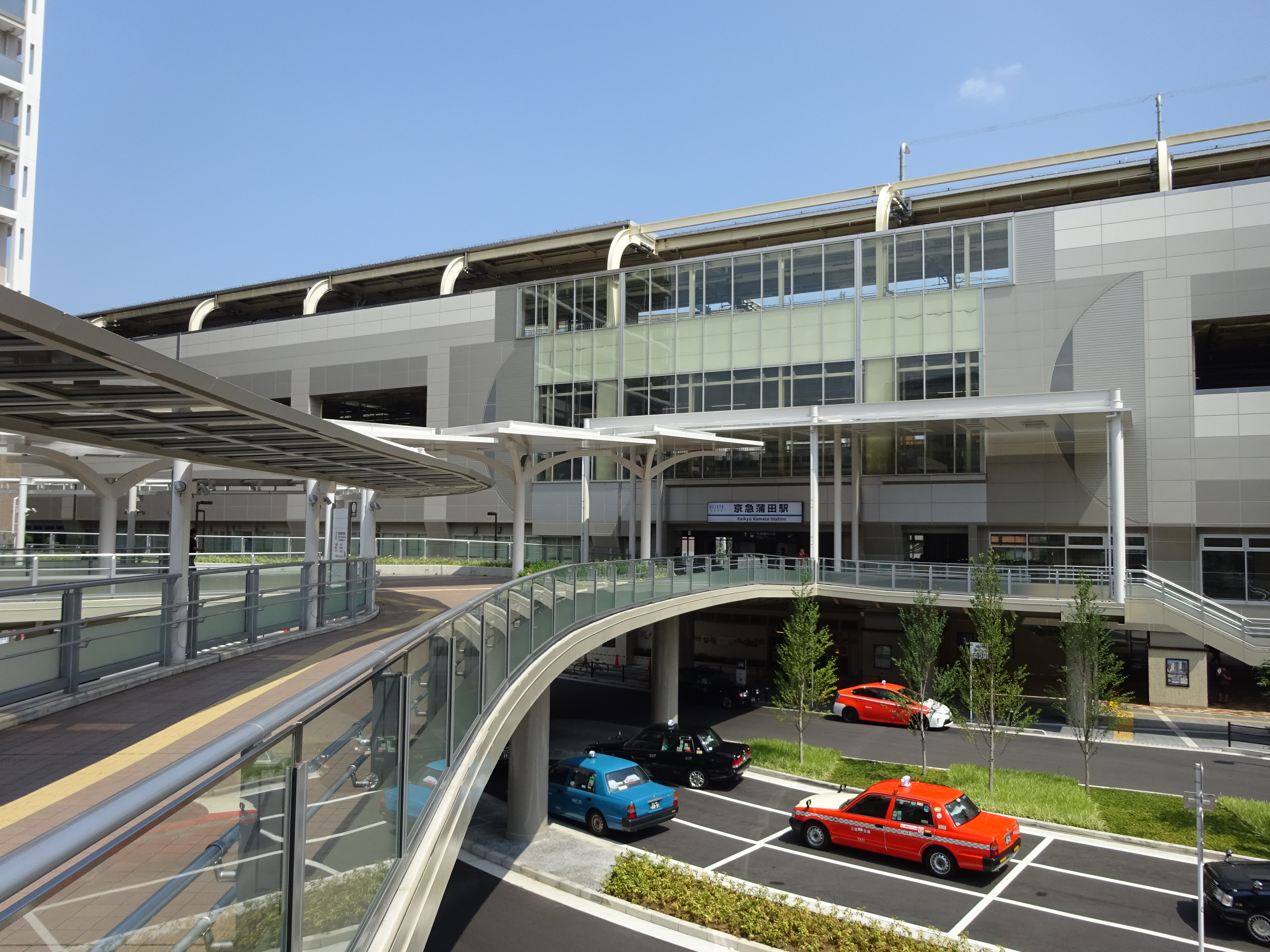
- Keikyū Kamata station entrance

General information
- Location: 4-50-10 Kamata; Ōta, Tokyo; Japan
- Coordinates: 35.5606799°N 139.7237295°E
- Operated by: Keikyū
- Lines: Keikyū Main Line; Keikyū Airport Line
- Platforms: 2 island platforms
- Tracks: 6

Construction
- Structure type: Elevated
- Platform levels: 2

Other information
- Station code: KK11

History
- Opened: 1 February 1901; 125 years ago
- Rebuilt: 1995, 2012
- Previous names: Kamata (1902–1925); Keihin Kamata (1925–1987)

Passengers
- FY2017: 61,746 daily

Services
Preceding station	Keikyu	Following station
Keikyū Kawasaki KK20 towards Misakiguchi	Evening Wing	Shinagawa KK01 One-way operation
Keikyū Kawasaki KK20 towards Horinouchi	Main Line Limited Express (Kaitoku)	Shinagawa KK01 towards Sengakuji
Keikyū Kawasaki KK20 towards Uraga	Main Line Limited Express (Tokkyū)	Heiwajima KK08 towards Sengakuji
through to Airport Line	Main Line Express (rush hours)	Heiwajima KK08 towards Sengakuji
Keikyū Kawasaki KK20 towards Kanazawa-hakkei	Main Line Express	through to Airport Line
Zōshiki KK18 towards Uraga	Main Line Local	Umeyashiki KK10 towards Shinagawa
Haneda Airport Terminal 3 KK16 towards Haneda Airport Terminal 1·2	Airport Line Limited Express (Kaitoku)	through to Main Line
Kōjiya KK12 towards Haneda Airport Terminal 1·2	Airport Line Limited Express (Tokkyū) Express Local	through to Main Line
Location

Keikyū Kamata Station (Japanese: 京急蒲田駅, Hepburn: Keikyū Kamata-eki) is a railway station in Ōta, Tokyo, Japan, operated by the private railway company Keikyū.

== Lines ==
Keikyū Kamata Station is served by the Keikyū Main Line and Keikyū Airport Line.

This station is a reversing station for direct train services between Yokohama and Haneda Airport.

== Station layout ==
As of 21 October 2012, the station structure has three levels. Trains toward Shinagawa station in central Tokyo and Haneda Airport (from Yokohama) depart from the second level, trains toward Yokohama and Haneda Airport (from Shinagawa) depart from the third level.

=== Platforms ===
Both floors have a single island platform in a unique configuration serving three tracks, with one track (2 and 5) being a passing loop that is inset from the other track.

In 2019, tracks 1, 3, 4, and 6 were equipped with platform screen doors, while platforms 2 and 5 were equipped with fixed barriers.

==== 3rd floor ====
1	Keikyū Main Line	for Yokohama, Kanazawa-Hakkei, Horinouchi, and Uraga; Keikyū Zushi Line for Zushi·Hayama; Keikyū Kurihama Line for Keikyū Kurihama
1	Keikyū Airport Line	for Haneda Airport Terminal 1·2 (from Shinagawa)
2	Keikyū Main Line (Local service)	for Yokohama, Kanazawa-Hakkei, and Uraga; Keikyū Zushi Line for Zushi·Hayama
3	Keikyū Main Line	for Yokohama, Kanazawa-Hakkei, Horinouchi, and Uraga; Keikyū Zushi Line for Zushi·Hayama; Keikyū Kurihama Line for Misakiguchi

==== 2nd floor ====
4	Keikyu Main Line	for Shinagawa and Sengakuji; Toei Asakusa Line for Shimbashi and Oshiage; Keisei Oshiage Line for Aoto; Keisei Main Line for Keisei-Narita and Narita Airport; Hokusō Line for Imba Nihon-idai; Narita Sky Access Line for Narita Airport
4	Keikyu Airport Line	for Haneda Airport Terminal 1·2 (from Yokohama and Zushi·Hayama)
5	Keikyu Main Line (Local service)	for Shinagawa
6	Keikyu Main Line	for Shinagawa and Sengakuji; Toei Asakusa Line for Shimbashi and Oshiage; Keisei Oshiage Line for Aoto; Keisei Main Line for Keisei-Narita and Narita Airport; Hokusō Line for Imba Nihon-idai; Narita Sky Access Line for Narita Airport

== History ==
The station opened on 1 February 1901 as Kamata Station (蒲田駅). The Airport Line (then called the Haneda Branch Line) was opened in 1902. Kamata Station was renamed Keihin Kamata Station (京浜蒲田駅) in November 1925, and again renamed Keikyū Kamata Station, the present name, on 1 June 1987.

In 1995, the platforms were extended to accommodate longer 12-car trains.

The station was rebuilt over a period of 12 years from December 2000 to October 2012 with the original ground-level tracks elevated to provide additional track capacity and eliminate road congestion on the three level crossings immediately adjacent to the station. As a result, the project won the Good Design Award presented by the Japan Institute of Design Promotion.

Keikyu introduced station numbering to its stations on 21 October 2010; Keikyū Kamata was assigned station number KK11.

== Future plans ==
Plans exist to extend the Tokyu Tamagawa Line from Kamata Station eastward by approximately 800 metres (2,600 ft) to Keikyu Kamata Station. This would provide an interchange between the lines, improving accessibility to Tokyo's Haneda Airport ahead of the 2020 Summer Olympics. These plans never materialized before the Olympics. As of June 2022, Ōta Ward has agreed with the Tokyo Metropolitan Government to pay 70% of the project cost of ¥136 billion (2021) (equivalent to ¥147.89 billion or US$977.06 million in 2024) while having the city government responsible for the remaining 30%.

== Surrounding area ==
- Ota Ward Office
- Kamata Station (JR Keihin-Tohoku Line)
- PiO (Plaza Industry Ota)
- National Route 15

== Gallery ==
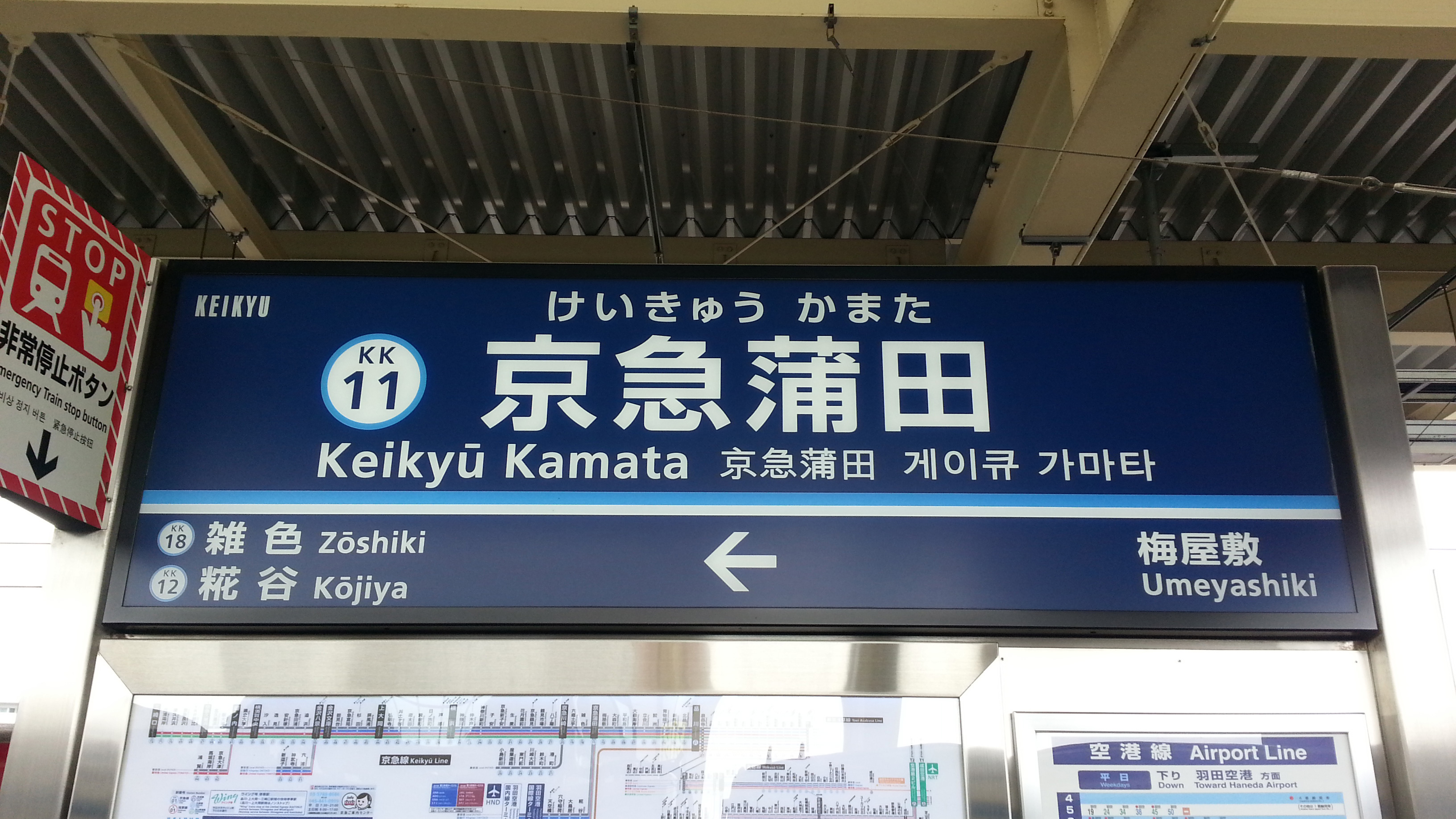
Station name sign in 2021

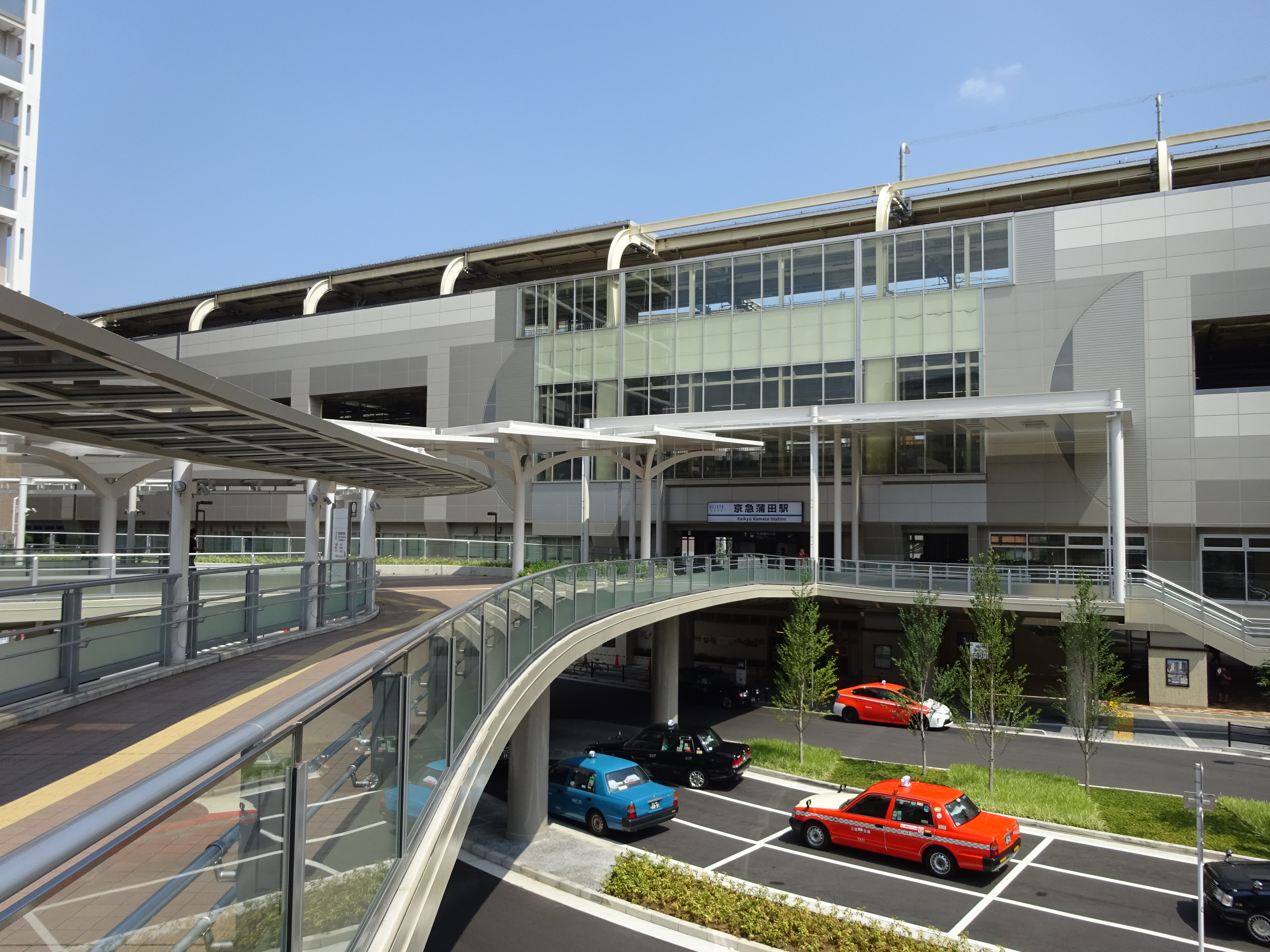
West exit in 2016

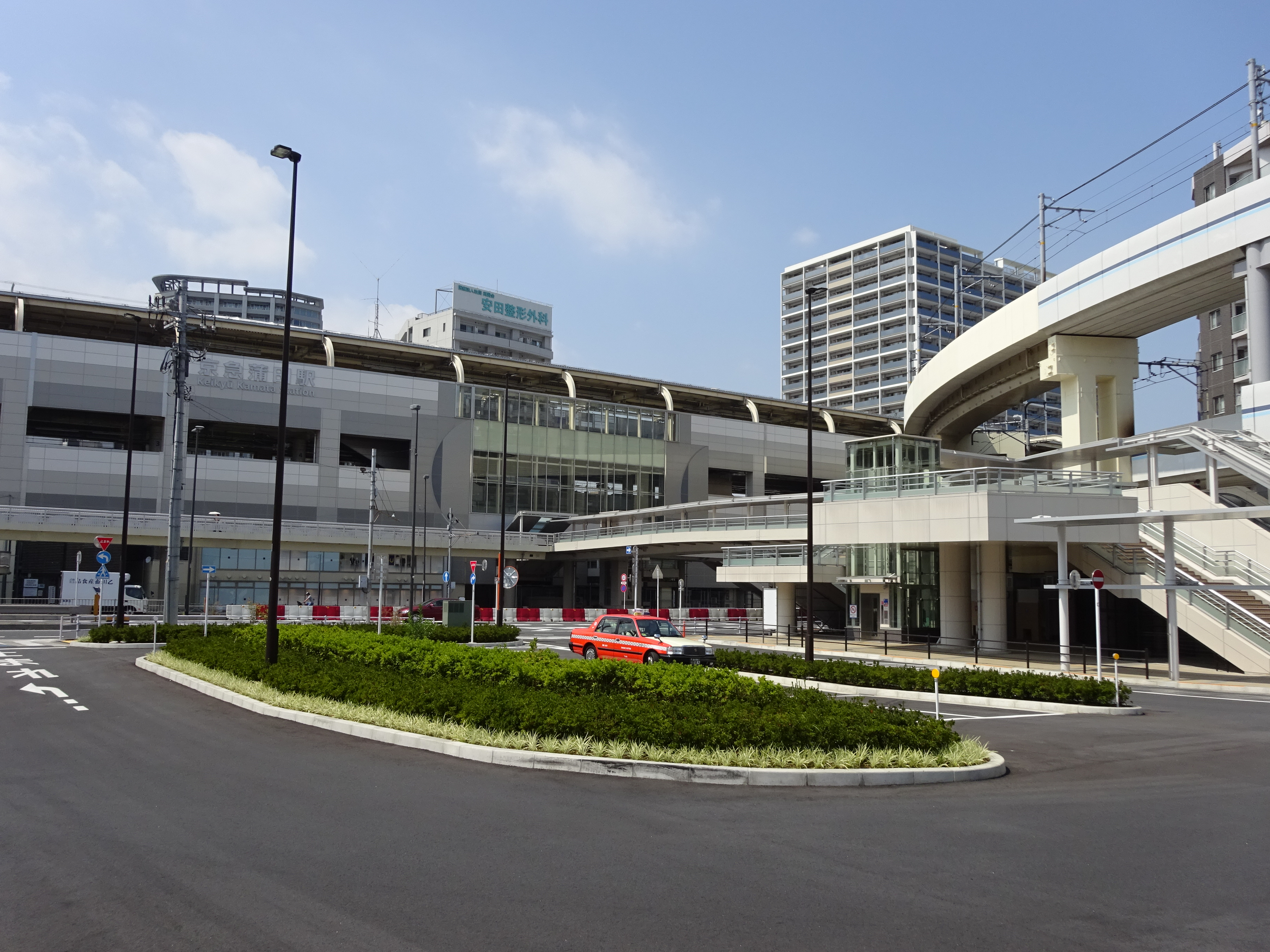
East exit in 2016

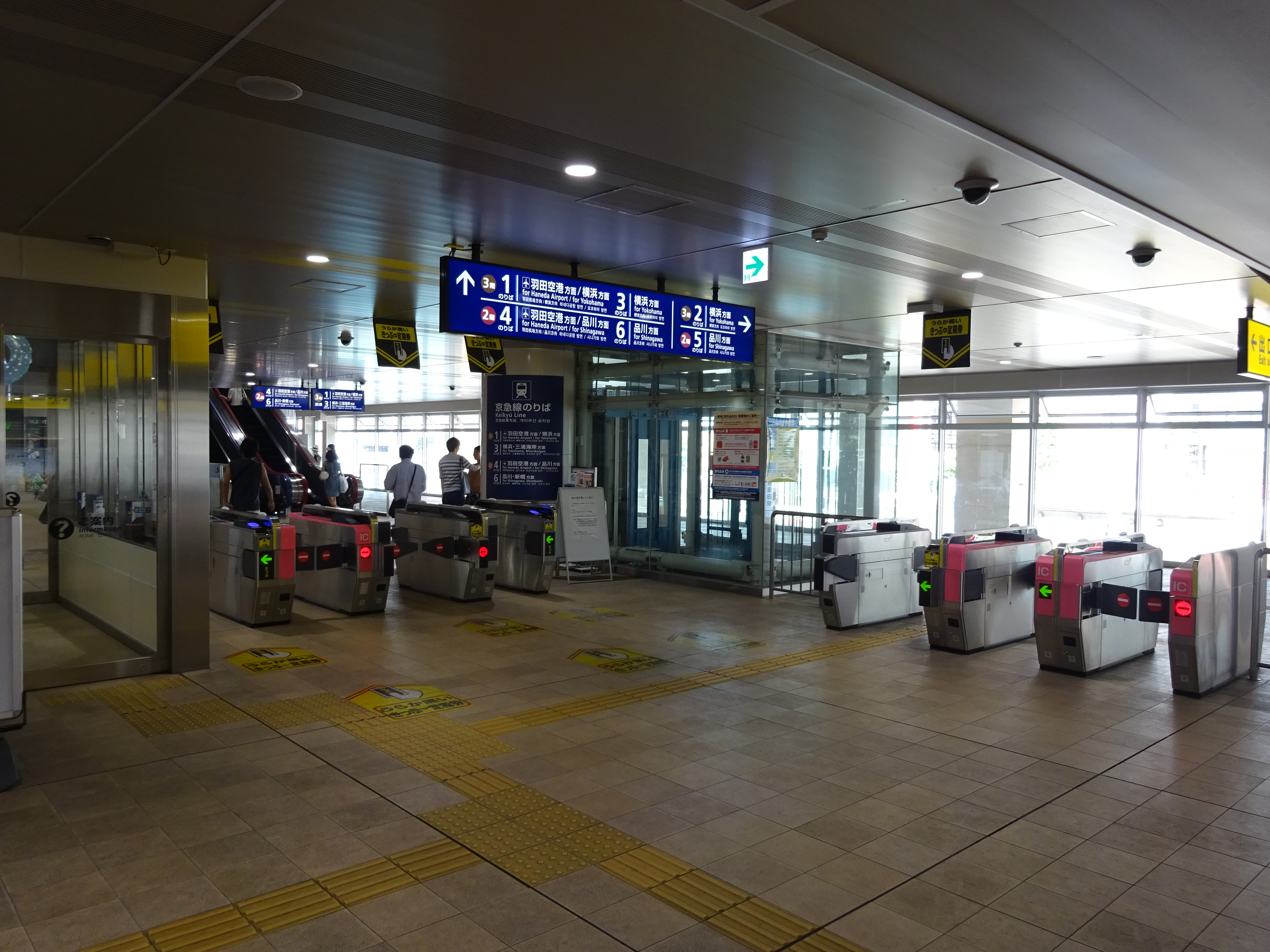
Ticket faregate area in 2016

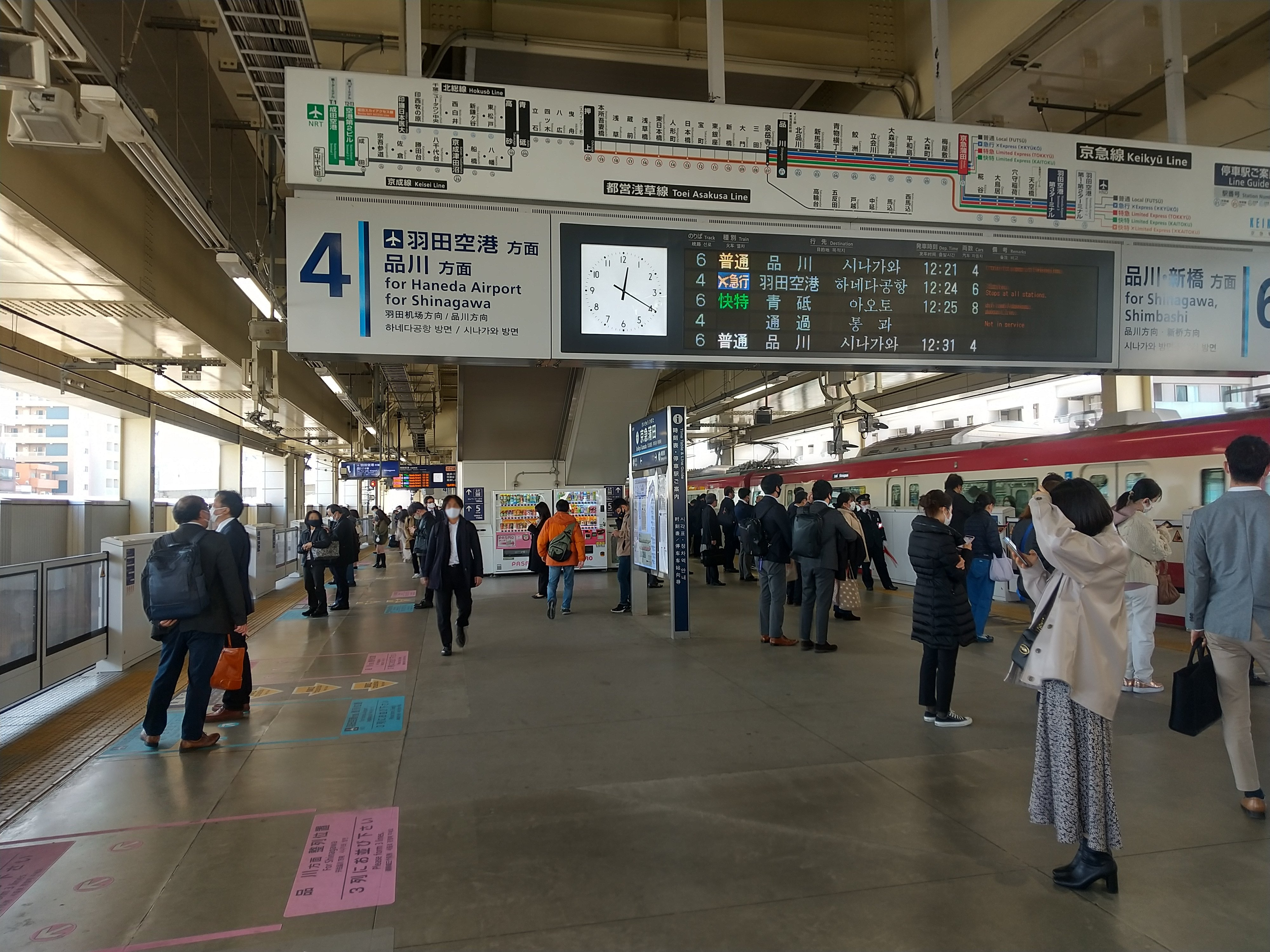
2nd-floor platforms in 2021 (Platforms 4 thru 6)

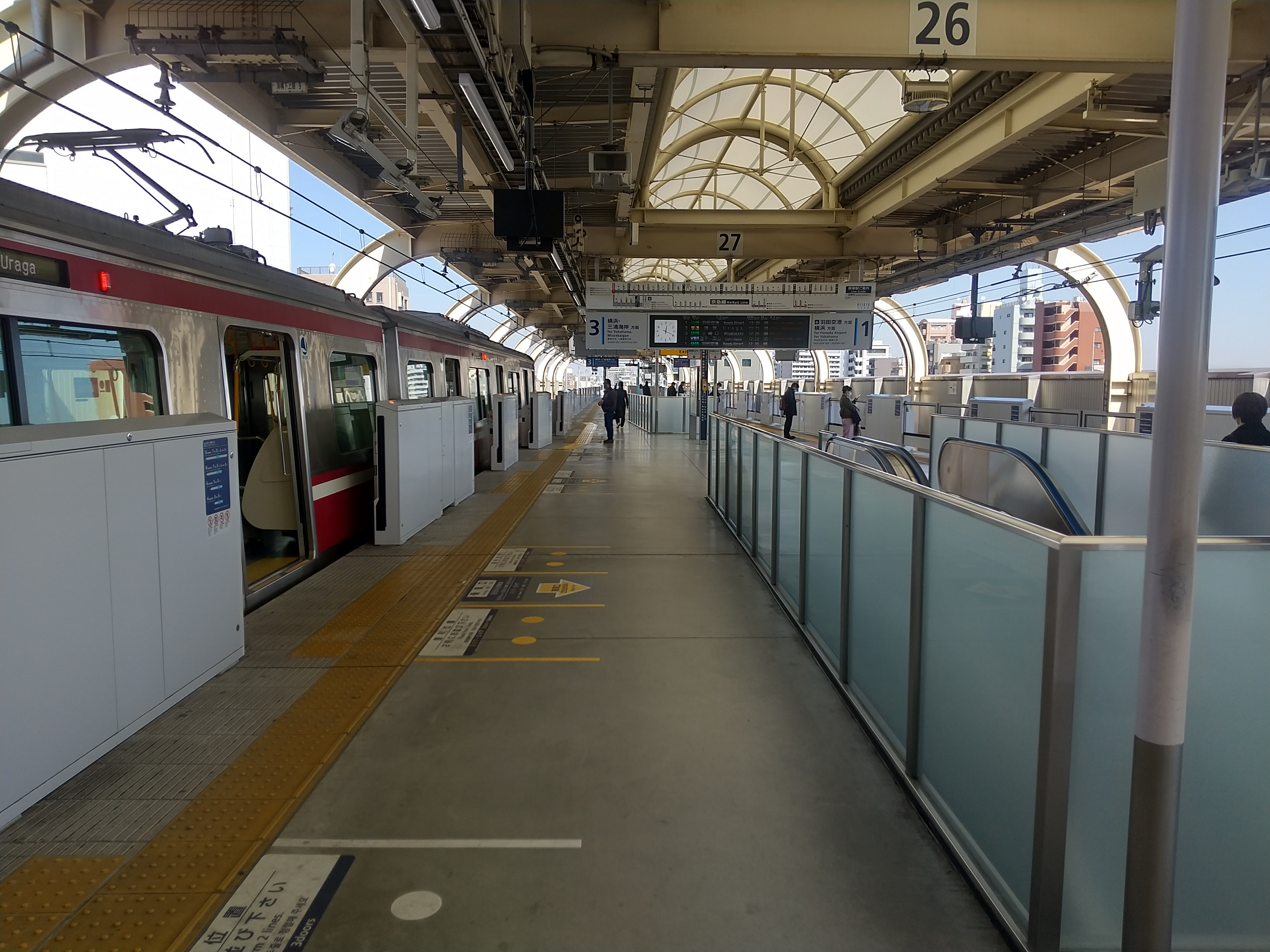
3rd-floor platforms in 2021 (Platforms 1 thru 3)
