= Haneda Airport Terminal 1·2 Station =

Railway station in Tokyo, Japan

KK17 Haneda Airport Terminal 1·2 Station 羽田空港第1・第2ターミナル駅
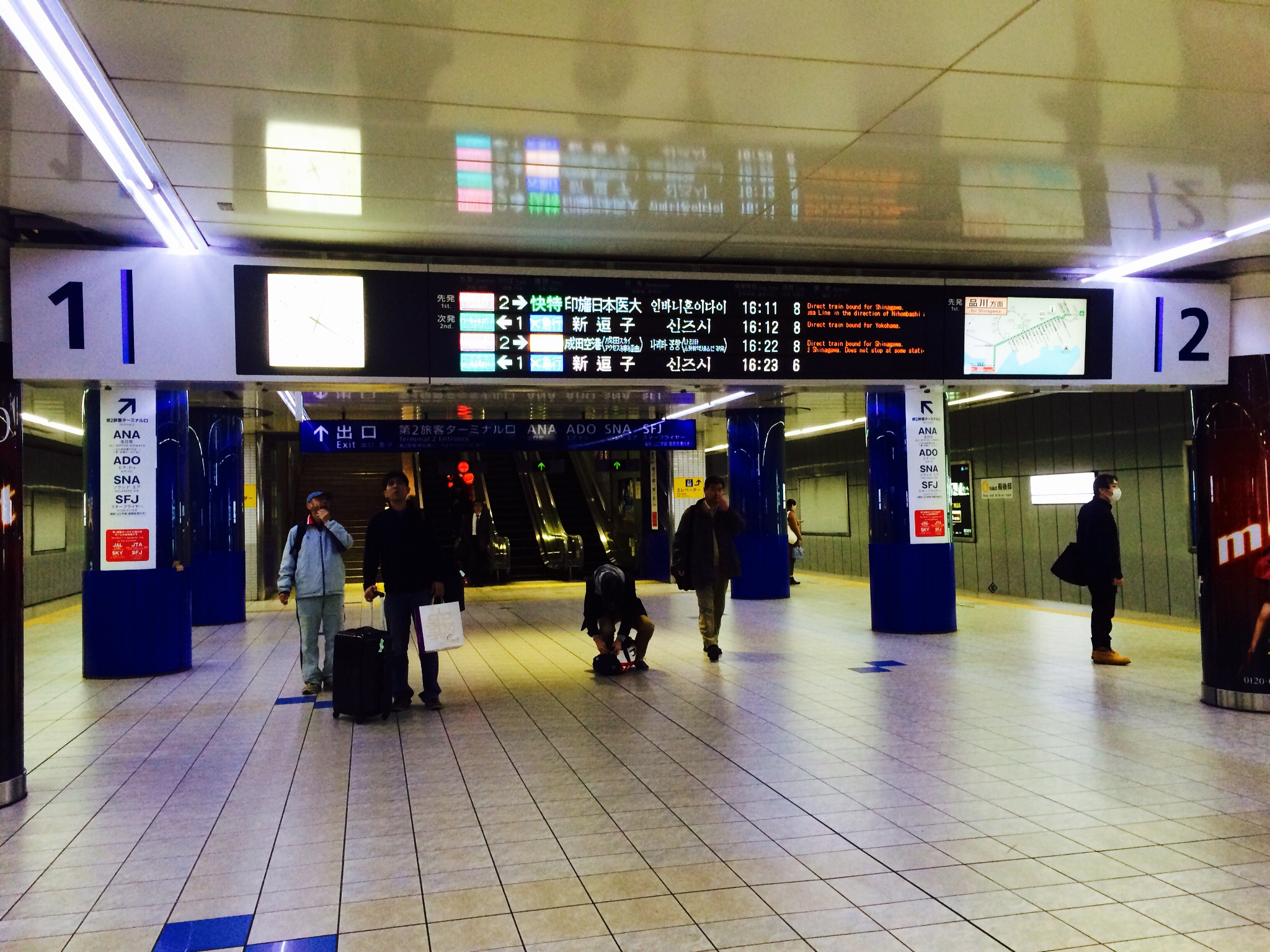
- The platforms, March 2015

General information
- Location: 3-3-4 Haneda-Kūkō; Ōta, Tokyo; Japan
- Coordinates: 35°33′00″N 139°47′11″E
- Operator: Keikyu
- Line: Keikyu Airport Line
- Platforms: 1 island platform
- Tracks: 2
- Connections: Haneda Airport

Construction
- Structure type: Underground
- Accessible: Yes

Other information
- Station code: KK17
- Website: Official website

History
- Opened: 18 November 1998
- Former names: Haneda Airport (until 2010); Haneda Airport Domestic Terminal (until 13 March 2020)

Passengers
- FY2011: 68,894 daily

Services
Preceding station	Keikyu	Following station
Terminus	Airport Line Airport Limited Express via Main Line	Haneda Airport Terminal 3 KK16 towards Sengakuji
Terminus	Airport Line Kaitoku Limited Express Tokkyū Limited Express Express Local	Haneda Airport Terminal 3 KK16 towards Keikyū Kamata
Location
- Location within Special wards of Tokyo Location within Tokyo Location within Japan

Haneda Airport Terminal 1·2 Station (羽田空港第1・第2ターミナル駅, Haneda-kūkō dai-ichi·dai-ni Tāminaru eki) is a railway station on the Keikyu Airport Line in Ōta, Tokyo, Japan, operated by the private railway operator Keikyu. It is situated directly beneath Tokyo International Airport ("Haneda Airport").

== Lines ==
Haneda Airport Terminal 1·2 Station is served by the 6.5 km (4.0 mi) Keikyu Airport Line from Keikyu Kamata, with through services to and from Shinagawa in central Tokyo and also from Narita Airport in Chiba Prefecture.

== Station layout ==
The station consists of an underground island platform serving two terminating tracks. The West Exit leads to Terminal 1 of the airport, and the East Exit leads to Terminal 2.

=== Platforms ===
1/2	Keikyu Airport Line	for Keikyū Kamata; Keikyū Main Line for Shinagawa and Sengakuji; Toei Asakusa Line for Shimbashi and Oshiage; Keisei Oshiage Line for Aoto; Keisei Main Line for Keisei Funabashi and Narita Airport; Hokusō Line for Inba-Nihon-Idai; Narita Sky Access Line for Narita Airport; Keikyū Main Line for Yokohama and Kanazawa-hakkei; Keikyū Zushi Line for Zushi·Hayama; Keikyū Kurihama Line for Keikyū Kurihama

== History ==
The station opened on 18 November 1998 as Haneda Airport Station (羽田空港駅, Haneda-Kūkō Eki)), coinciding with the extension of the Keikyu Airport Line. On 1 December 2004, the East Exit opened following the opening of the Terminal 2 building.

The station was renamed Haneda Airport Domestic Terminal Station (羽田空港国内線ターミナル駅, Haneda-kūkō Kokunaisen Tāminaru eki) on 21 October 2010, when Haneda Airport International Terminal Station opened to serve the newly built international terminal of the airport.

Keikyu introduced station numbering to its stations on 21 October 2010; Haneda Airport Domestic Terminal Station was assigned station number KK17.

The station was renamed again on 14 March 2020 to Haneda Airport Terminal 1·2 Station, coinciding with the change in the names of all three of Haneda's terminal buildings.

== Expansion ==
On 8 August 2022, construction started on a pocket track and switch past the current station. Once complete, this will allow capacity on the Airport Line to increase by three trains per hour. In order to accommodate construction, a portion of the passenger walkway from the station to Terminal 2 has been closed off.

== Passenger statistics ==
In fiscal 2011, the station was used by an average of 68,894 passengers daily.

== Surrounding area ==
- Haneda Airport domestic terminals 1 & 2
- Shuto Expressway Wangan Line
- National Route 357
