= Higashi-Azuma Station =

Railway station in Tokyo, Japan

Coordinates: 35.7069°N 139.8318°E

TS42 Higashi-Azuma Station 東あずま駅
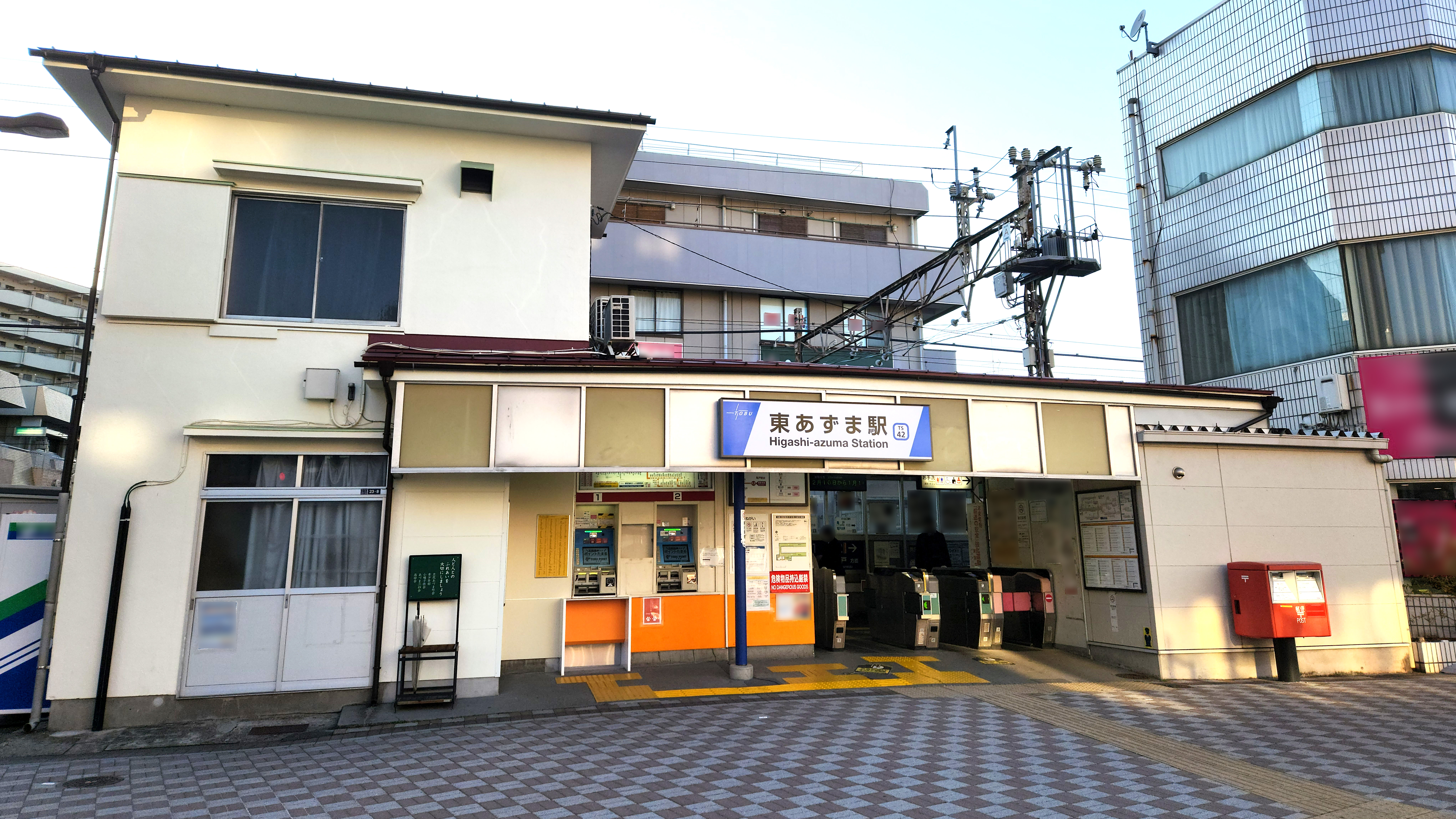
- The station building in December 2022

General information
- Location: 4-23-8 Tachibana, Sumida, Tokyo （墨田区立花4-23-8） Japan
- Operator: Tobu Railway
- Line: Tōbu Kameido Line

History
- Opened: 1928

Services
Preceding station	Tobu Railway	Following station
Kameidosuijin TS43 towards Kameido	Kameido Line	Omurai TS41 towards Hikifune
Location
- Location within Tokyo Location within Japan

Higashi-Azuma Station (東あずま駅, Higashi-Azuma-eki) is a railway station in Sumida, Tokyo, Japan, operated by Tobu Railway.

== Lines ==
Higashi-Azuma Station is served by the 3.4 km Tōbu Kameido Line from Hikifune to Kameido, and is located 2.0 km from Hikifune.

== Station layout ==
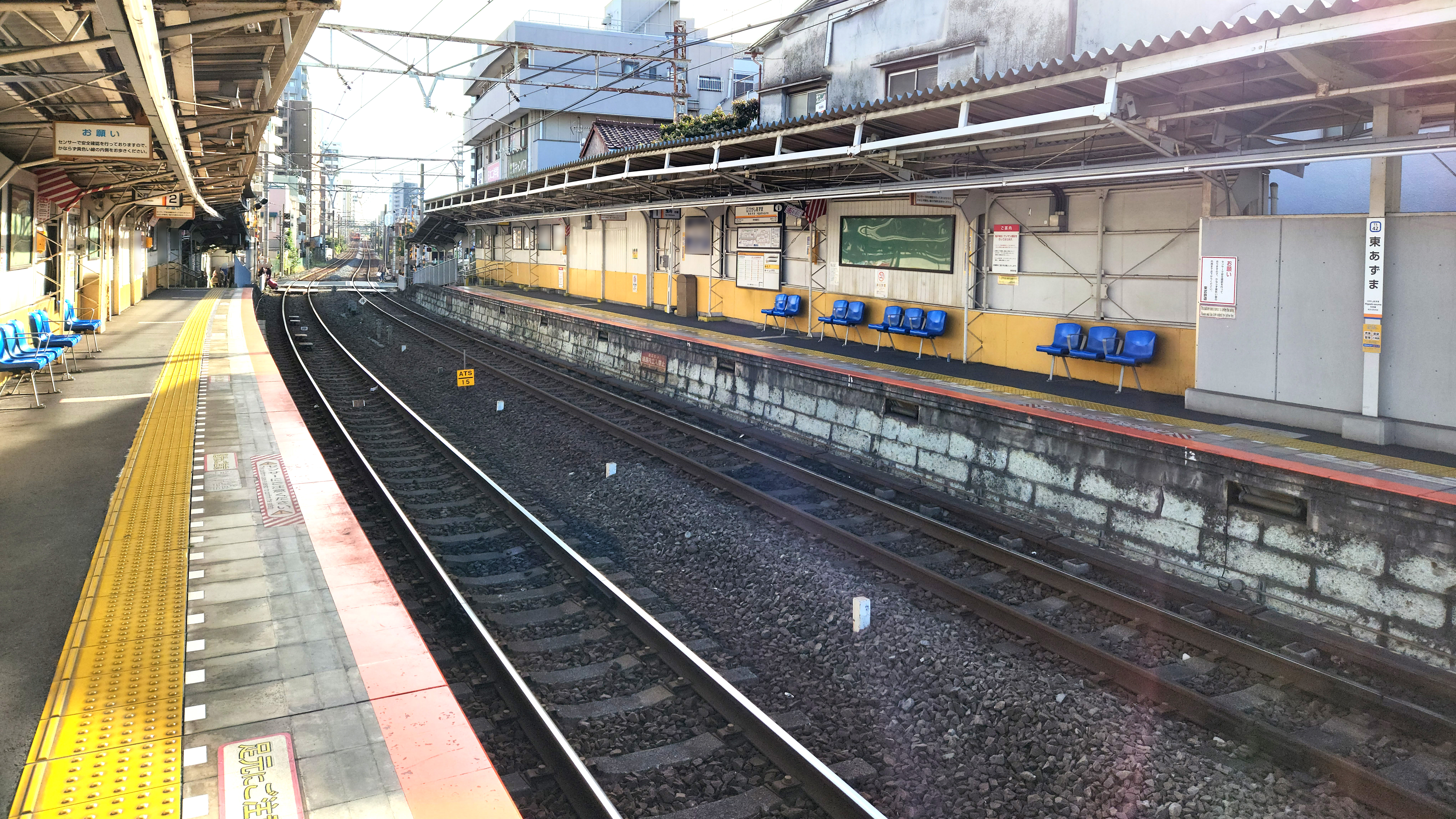
The platforms in December 2022

The station consists of two opposed side platforms serving two tracks.

=== Platforms ===
1	Tōbu Kameido Line	for Hikifune
2	Tōbu Kameido Line	for Kameido

== History ==
The station opened on 15 April 1928.

== Route bus ==
The すみだ百景 すみまるくん・すみりんちゃん 北東部ルート – Sumida Hyakkei Sumimarukun・Sumimaruchan Hokutobu Route bus passes through this station. The bus stop is called Higashi-Azuma Station and it is located west of the station. It takes about 2 minutes from the station to the bus stop on foot.

Name	Via	Destination	Company	Note
Hokutobu Route	Shirahige Shrine Iriguchi・TachibanaTaishōminkaen Iriguchi・Yahiro Station・Nakamura Hospital・Hikifune Elementary School	Oshiage Station	Keisei Bus	There is Free Pass

== Surrounding area ==
- Tokyo Tachibana High School
