= Kameidosuijin Station =

Railway station in Tokyo, Japan

Coordinates: 35.7003°N 139.8337°E

TS43 Kameidosuijin Station 亀戸水神駅
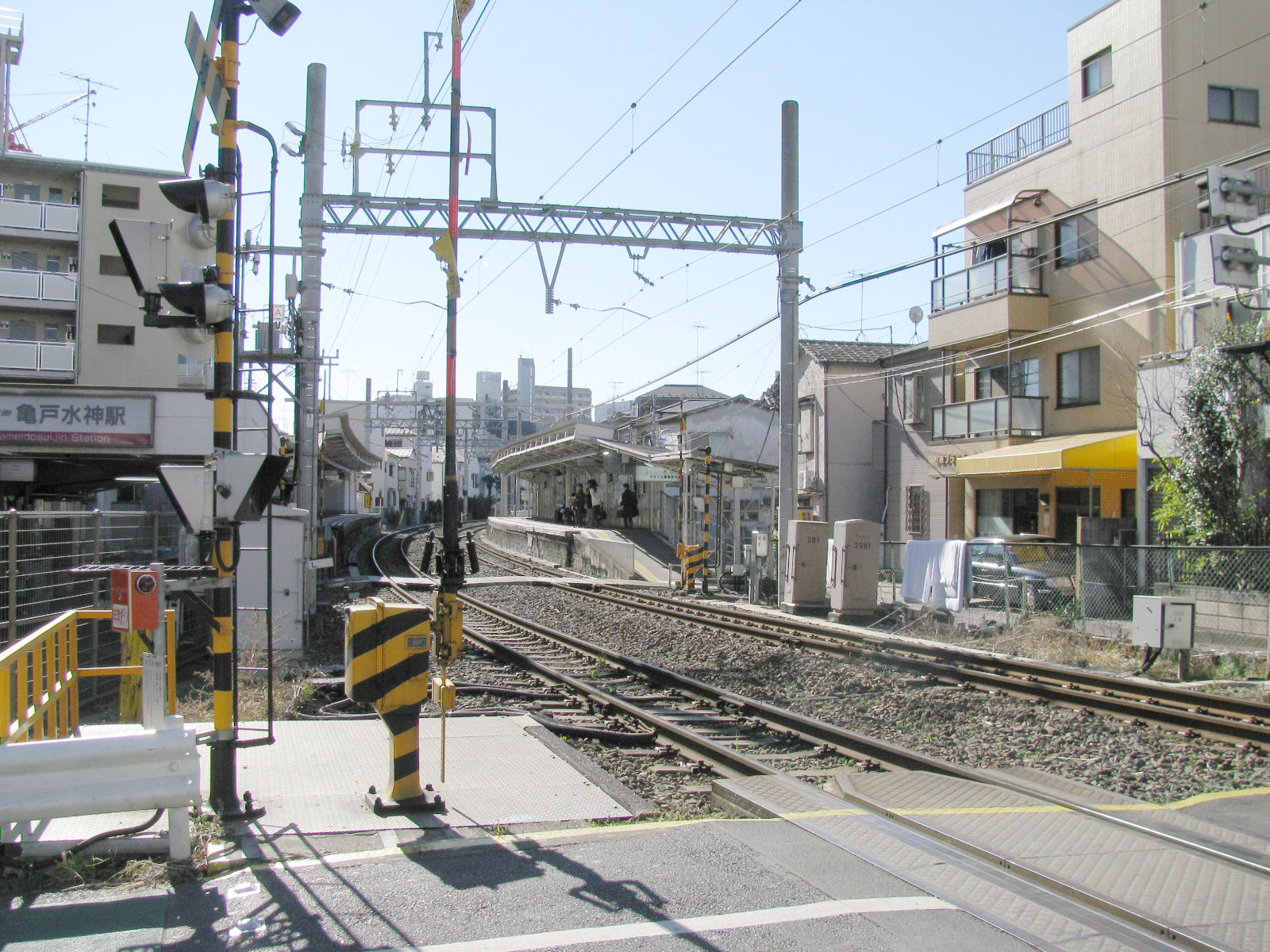
- View of the platforms, January 2008

General information
- Location: 8-5-1 Kameido, Kōtō, Tokyo （江東区亀戸8-5-1） Japan
- Operator: Tobu Railway
- Line: Tōbu Kameido Line

History
- Opened: 1928

Services
Preceding station	Tobu Railway	Following station
Kameido TS44 Terminus	Kameido Line	Higashi-Azuma TS42 towards Hikifune
Location
- Location within Tokyo Location within Japan

Kameidosuijin Station (亀戸水神駅, Kameido-suijin-eki) is a railway station in Kōtō, Tokyo, Japan, operated by Tobu Railway.

== Lines ==
Kameidosuijin Station is served by the 3.4 km Tōbu Kameido Line from Hikifune to Kameido, and is located 2.7 km from Hikifune.

== Station layout ==
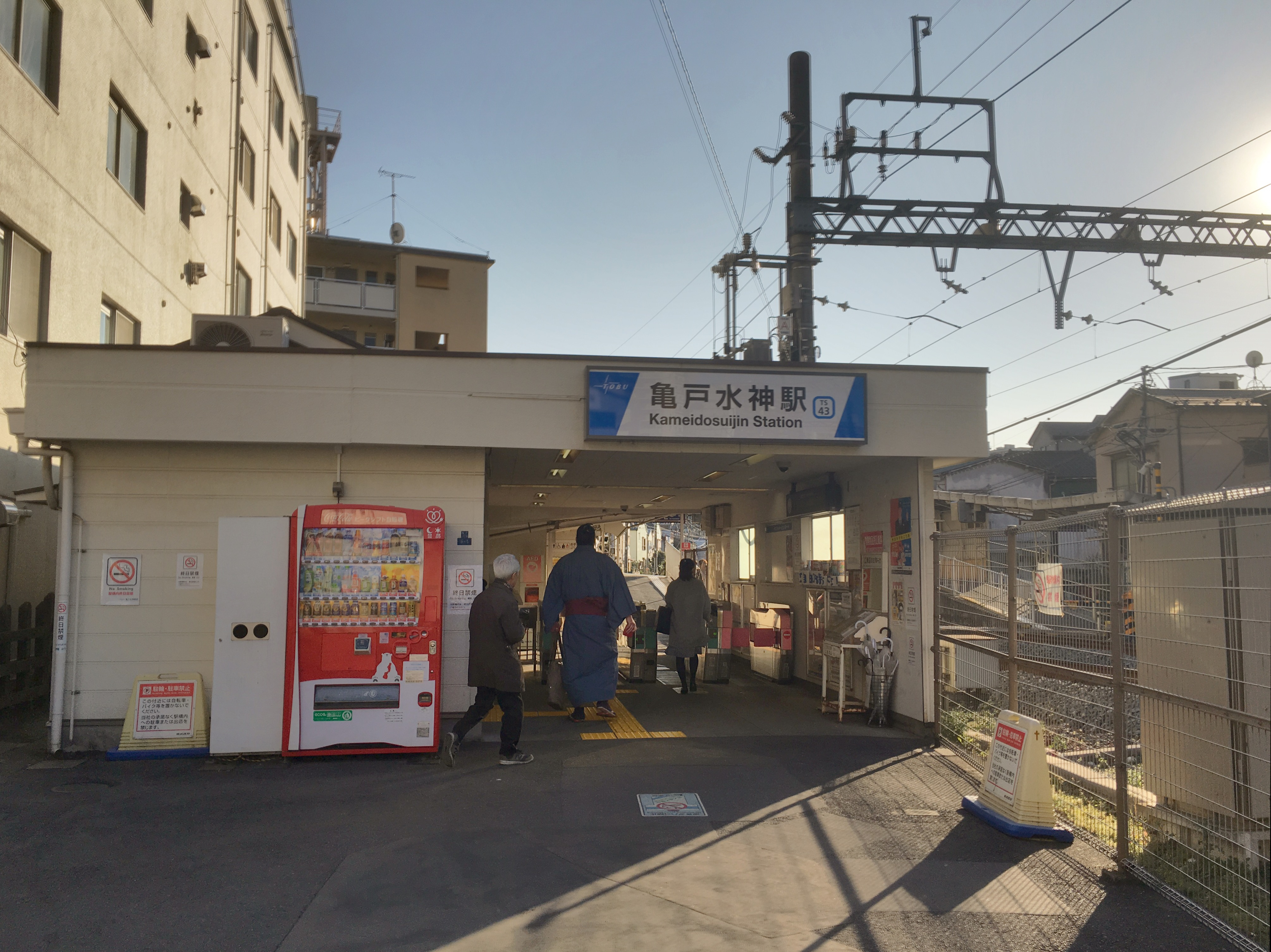
Station entrance, January 2018

The station consists of two opposed side platforms serving two tracks.

=== Platforms ===
1	Tōbu Kameido Line	for Hikifune
2	Tōbu Kameido Line	for Kameido

== History ==
The station opened on 15 April 1928. At the time, the station was located slightly southwest of its current location. On December 5, 1946, it absorbed the adjacent, now-defunct Kitajikken Station, moving to its current location roughly midway between the two.

== Surrounding area ==
- Kameido Chuo Park
