= Omurai Station =

Railway station in Tokyo, Japan

TS41 Omurai Station 小村井駅
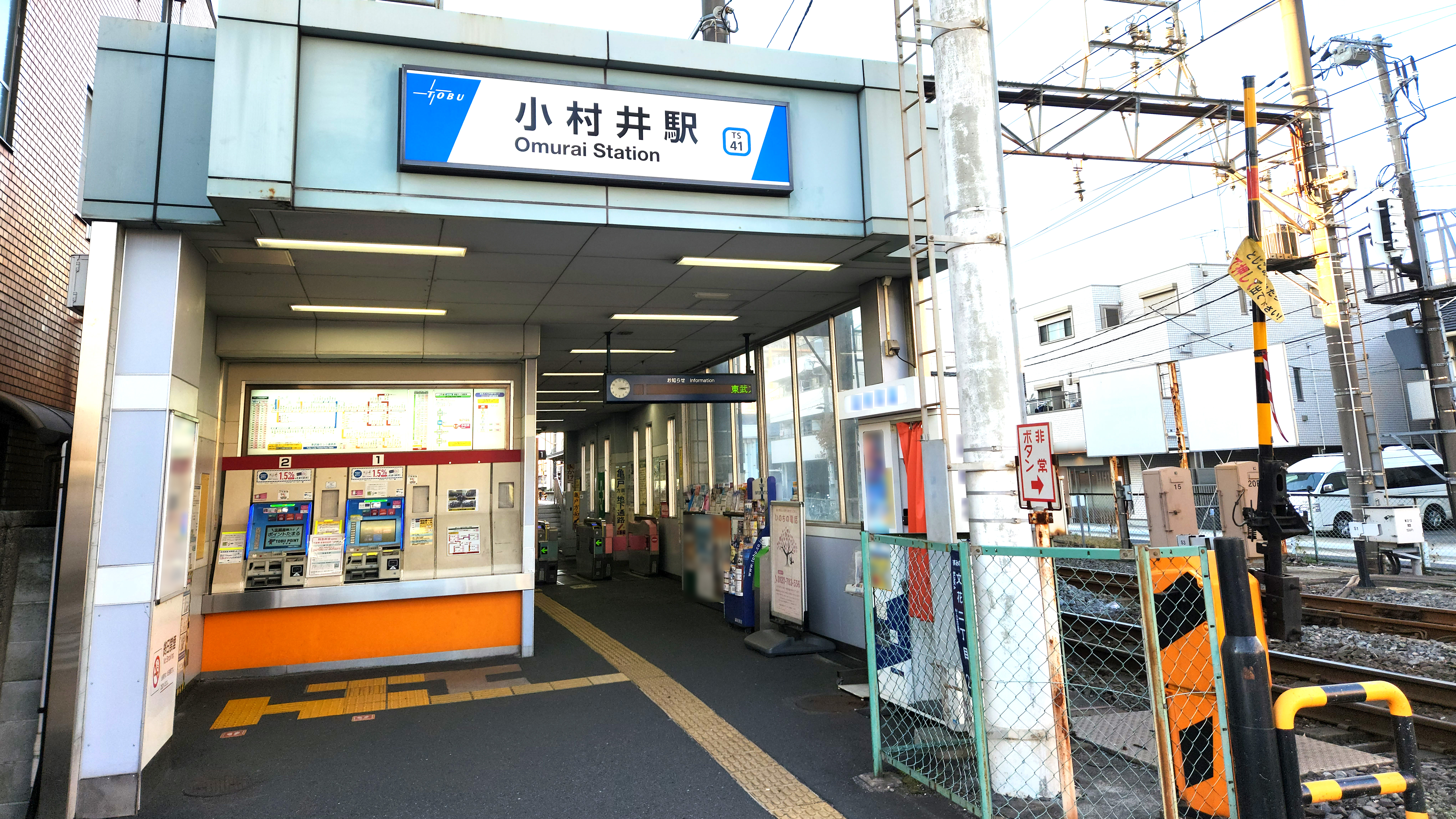
- The entrance in December 2022

General information
- Location: 2-20-1 Bunka, Sumida-ku, Tokyo; Japan
- Coordinates: 35.7104°N 139.8274°E
- Operator: Tobu Railway
- Line: Tobu Kameido Line
- Platforms: 2 side platforms
- Tracks: 2

Other information
- Station code: TS-41
- Website: Official website

History
- Opened: 15 April 1928

Services
Preceding station	Tobu Railway	Following station
Higashi-Azuma TS42 towards Kameido	Kameido Line	Hikifune TS04 Terminus
Location
- Location within Tokyo Location within Japan

Omurai Station (小村井駅, Omurai-eki) is a railway station on the Tobu Kameido Line in Sumida, Tokyo, Japan, operated by the private railway operator Tobu Railway.

== Lines ==
Omurai Station is served by the 3.4 km Tobu Kameido Line from Hikifune to Kameido, and is located 1.4 km from Hikifune.

== Station layout ==
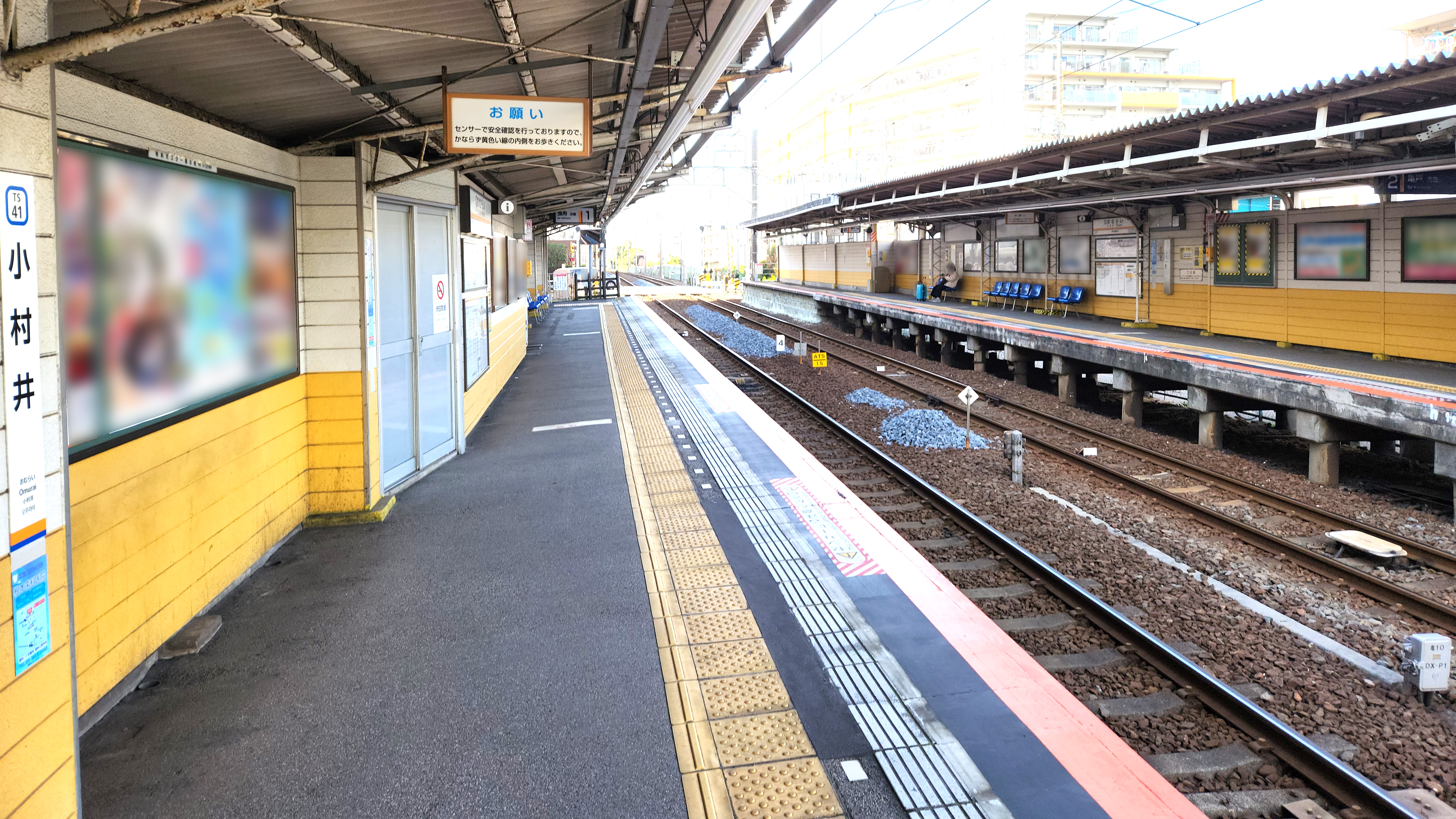
The platforms in December 2022

The station has two staggered side platforms serving two tracks.

=== Platforms ===
1	Tobu Kameido Line	for Hikifune
2	Tobu Kameido Line	for Kameido

== History ==
The station opened on 15 April 1928.

From 17 March 2012, station numbering was introduced on Tobu lines, with Omurai Station becoming "TS-41".

== Surrounding area ==
- Mukojima Police Station
- Koimari Museum
- Koganeyu
- Kyunaka River
- Yokoamicho Park

== See also ==
- List of railway stations in Japan
