= Higashi-Mukōjima Station =

Railway station in Tokyo, Japan

Coordinates: 35.7244°N 139.8195°E

TS05 Higashi-Mukōjima Station 東向島駅
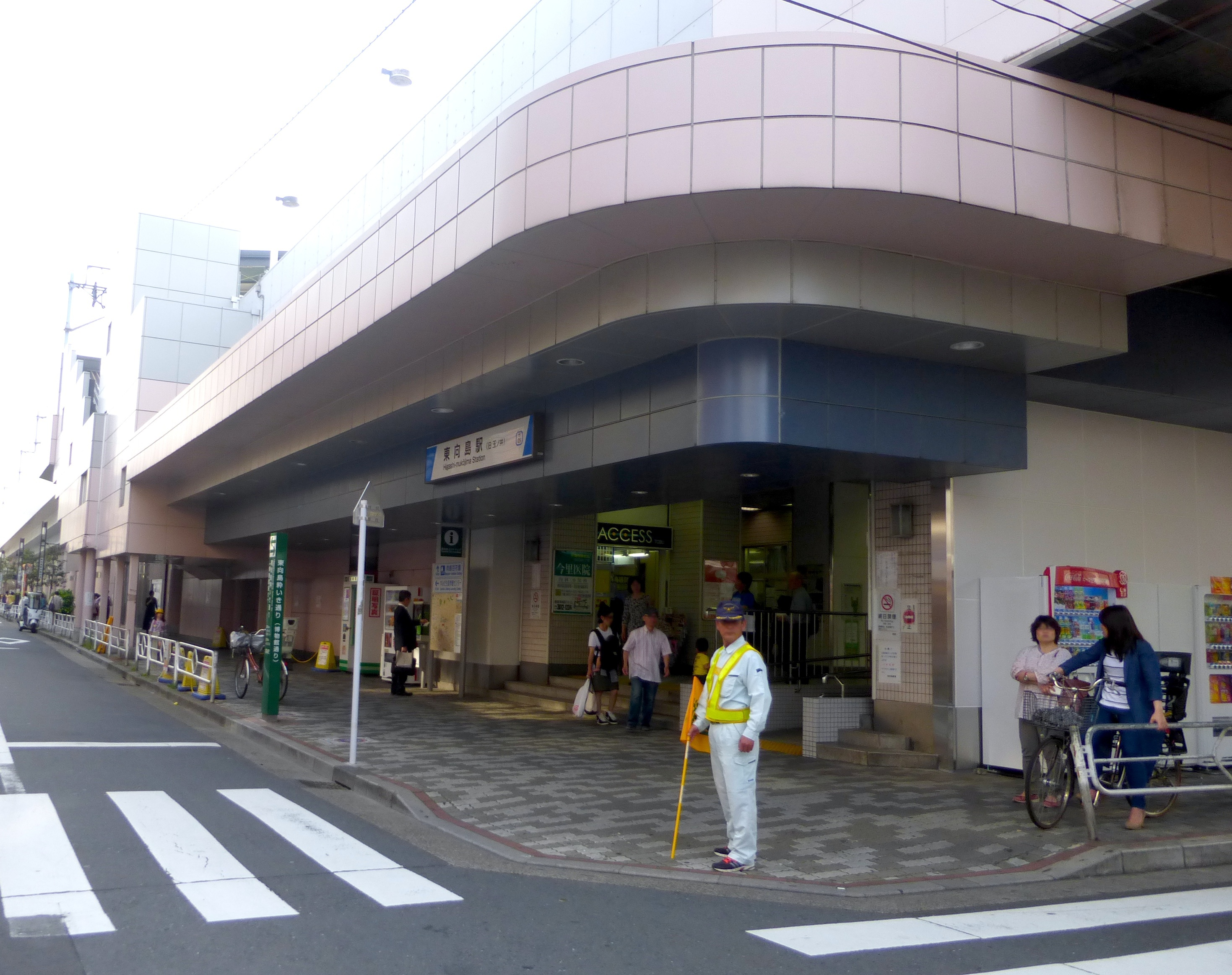
- Station entrance, April 2015

General information
- Location: 4-29-7 Higashi-Mukōjima, Sumida, Tokyo （墨田区東向島4-29-7） Japan
- Operator: Tobu Railway
- Line: Tobu Skytree Line

History
- Opened: 1902
- Former names: Tamanoi (until 1988)

Passengers
- FY2024: 9,557 daily boardings

Services
Preceding station	Tobu Railway	Following station
Hikifune TS04 towards Asakusa	Tobu Skytree Line Section Express Section Semi Express Local	Kanegafuchi TS06 towards Tōbu-Dōbutsu-Kōen
Location

Higashi-Mukōjima Station (東向島駅, Higashi-Mukōjima eki) is a railway station on the Tobu Skytree Line in Sumida, Tokyo, Japan, operated by Tobu Railway.

== Lines ==
The station is served by the Tobu Skytree Line from Asakusa Station in Tokyo to Tōbu-Dōbutsu-Kōen in Saitama Prefecture. It is located 3.2 km from Asakusa Station.

== Station layout ==
Higashi-Mukōjima Station has two opposite side platforms serving two tracks.

=== Platforms ===
1	Tobu Skytree Line	for Kita-Senju, Kasukabe, Tōbu-Dōbutsu-Kōen, Kuki, and Minami-Kurihashi
2	Tobu Skytree Line	for Hikifune and Asakusa

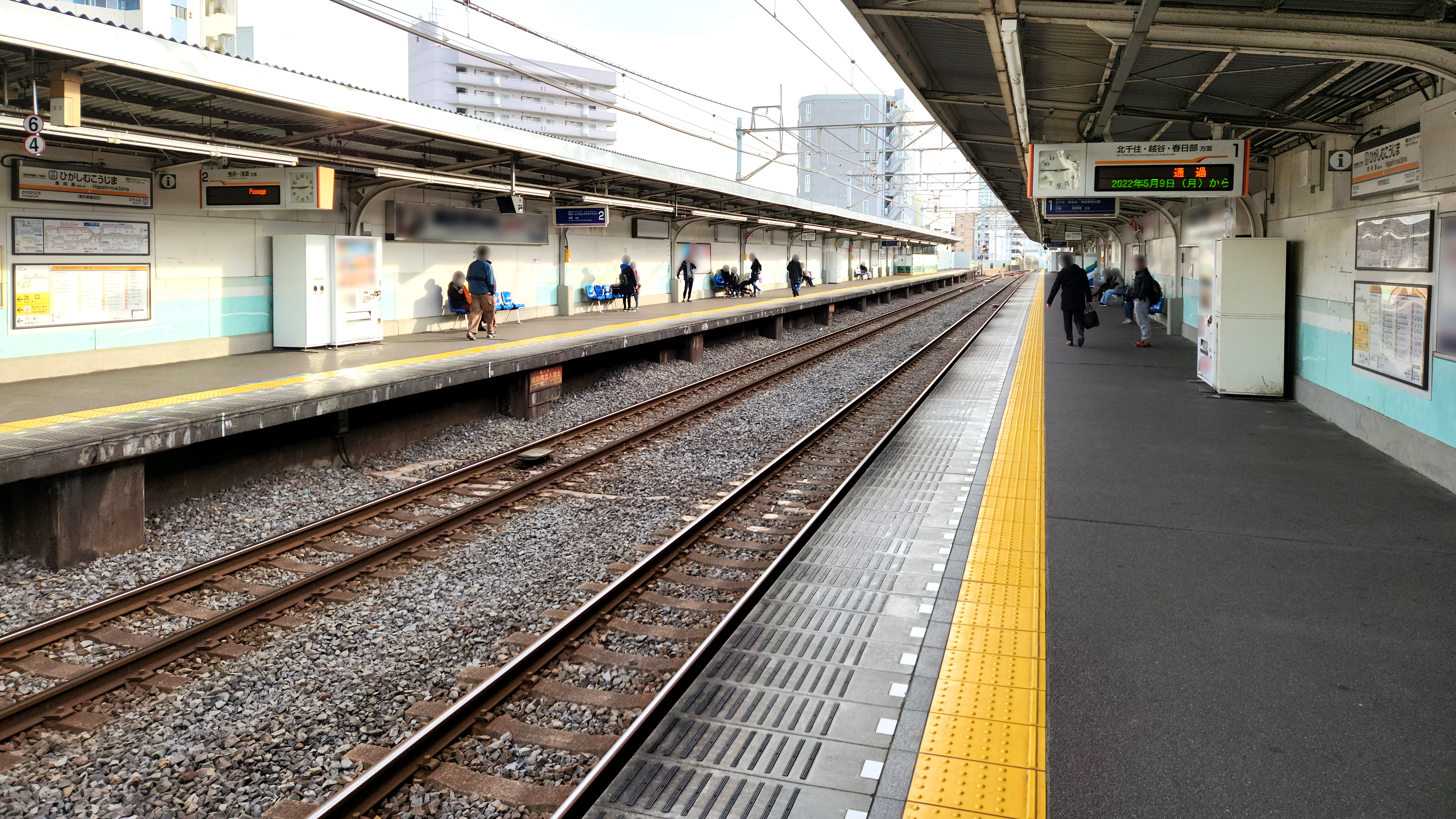
The platforms in December 2022

== History ==
The station first opened on 1 April 1902 as Shirahige Station (白鬚駅), but operations were suspended from 15 July 1905, and the station was formally closed from 4 April 1908. It reopened as Tamanoi Station (玉ノ井駅) on 1 October 1923 following urban regrowth after the 1923 Great Kantō earthquake. On 12 December 1987, the station was renamed Higashi-Mukōjima Station.

== Passenger statistics ==
In fiscal 2024, the station was used by an average of 9,557 passengers daily (boarding passengers only).

== Surrounding area ==
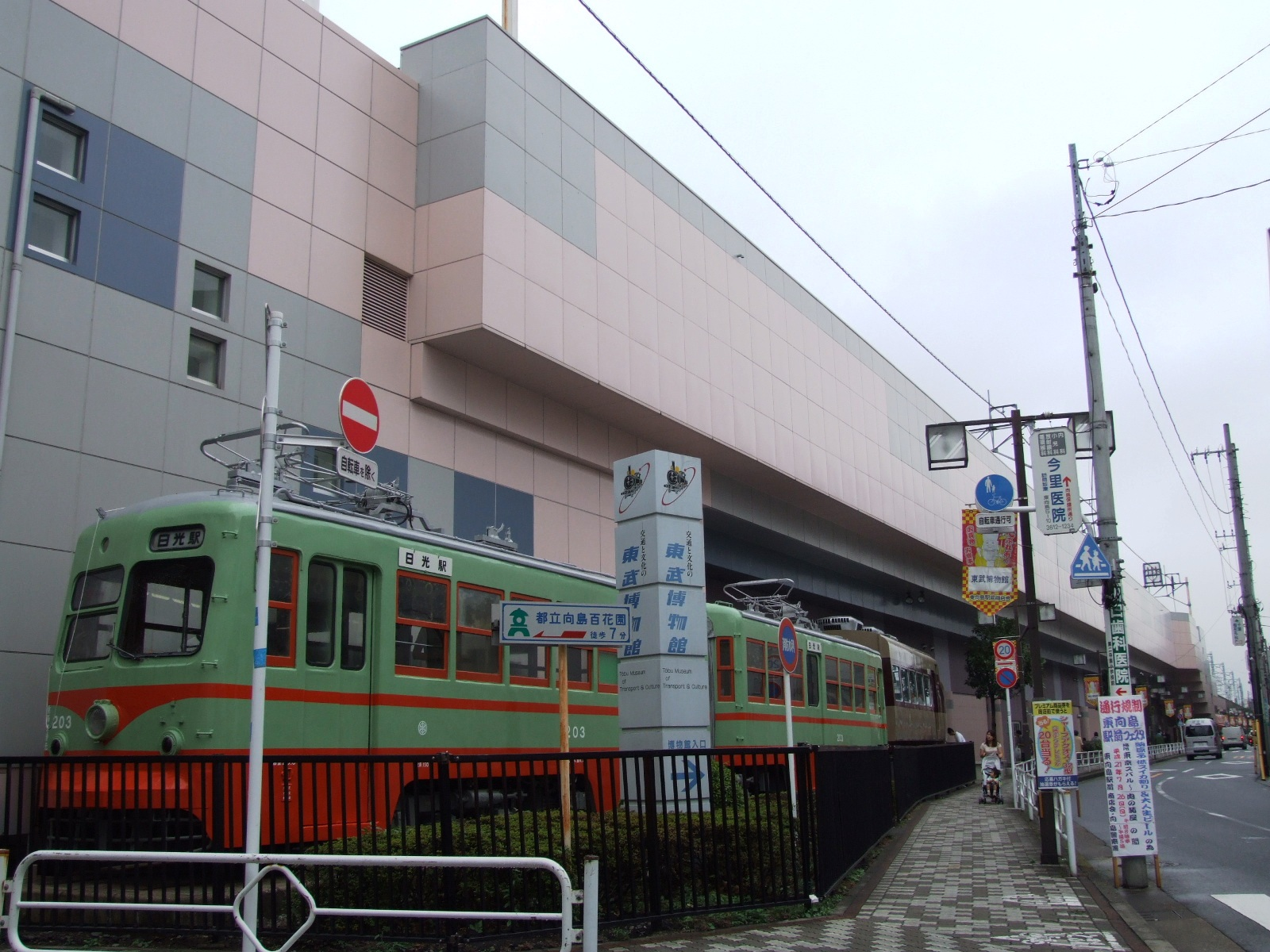
Tobu Museum

- Tobu Museum, located beneath the elevated station and tracks, with viewing windows located beneath the platforms
- Mukōjima Hyakkaen, flower garden dating from the Edo period
- Tokyo Metropolitan Sumidagawa High School
- Route 6 (Mito Kaidō)
- Meiji Dōri
