= Sumida, Tokyo =

Sumida 墨田区
- Special ward
- Sumida City
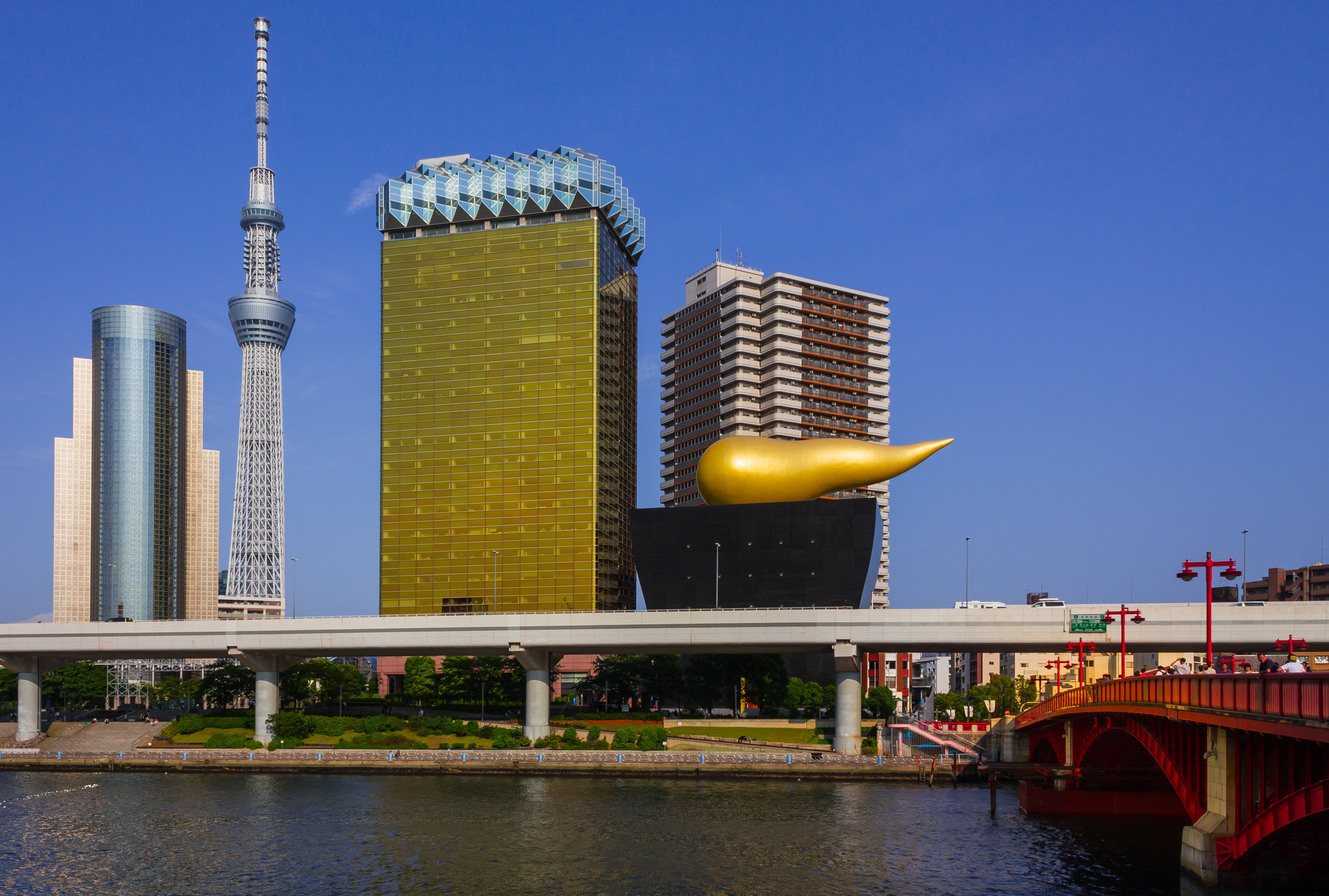
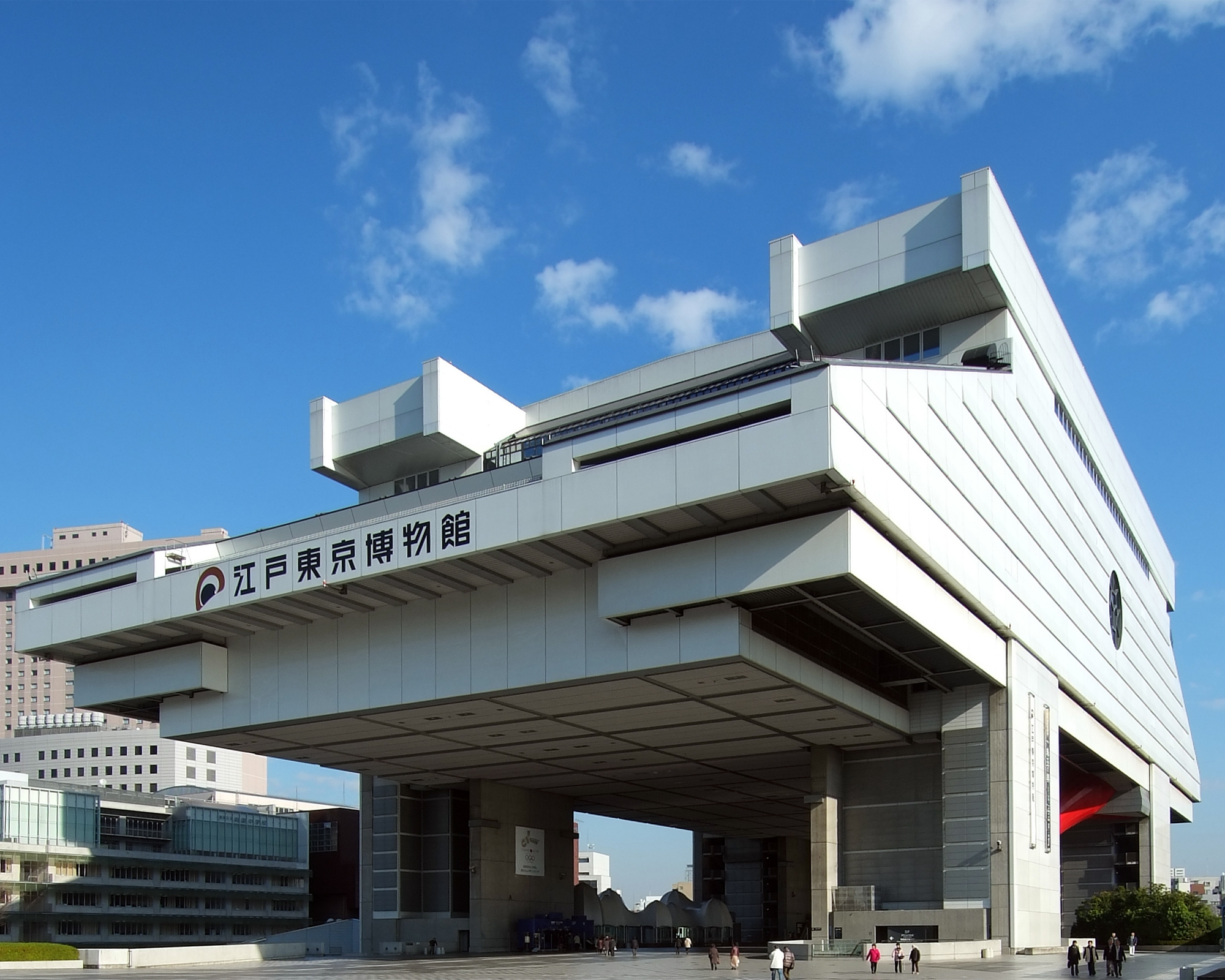
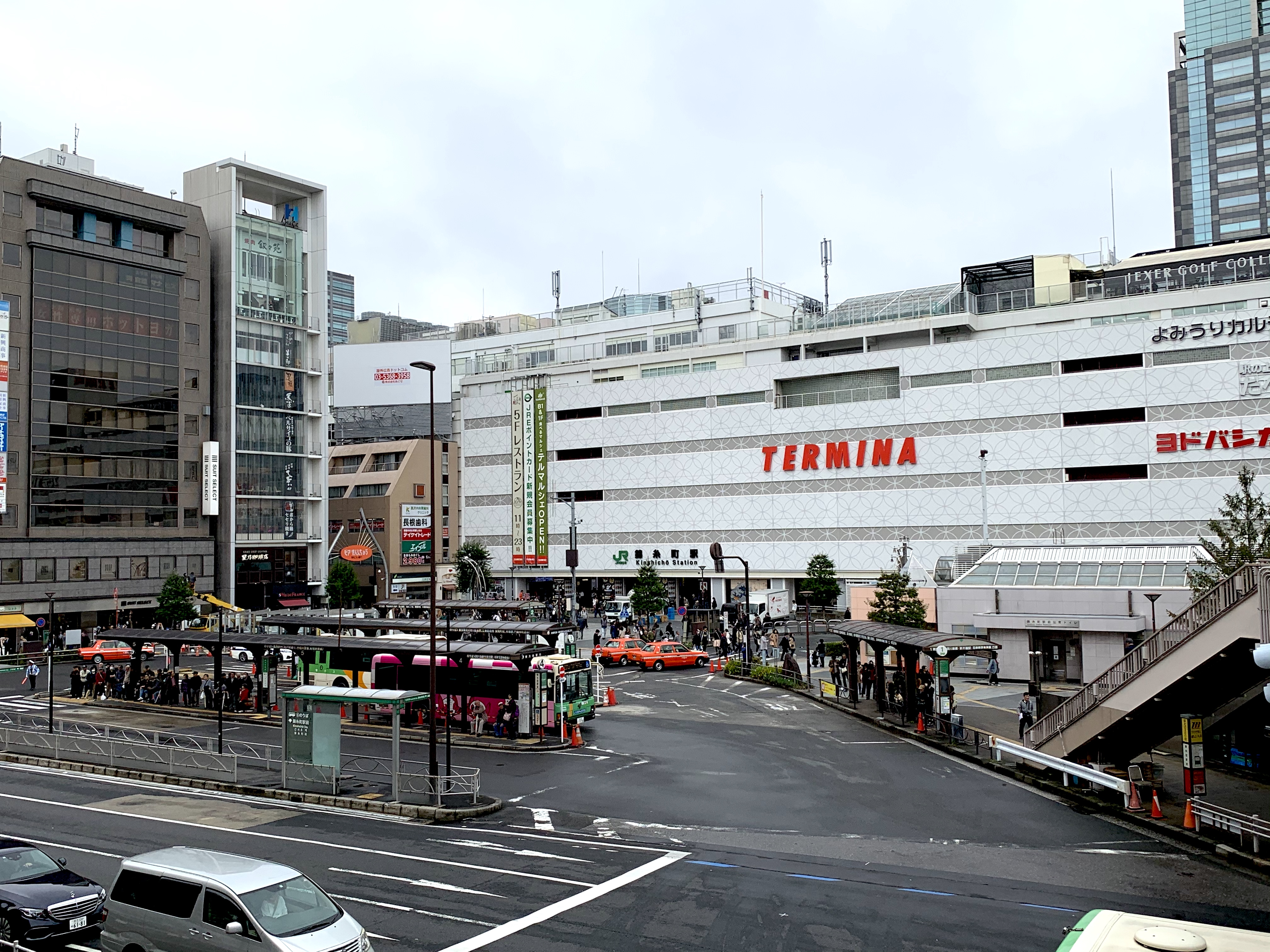
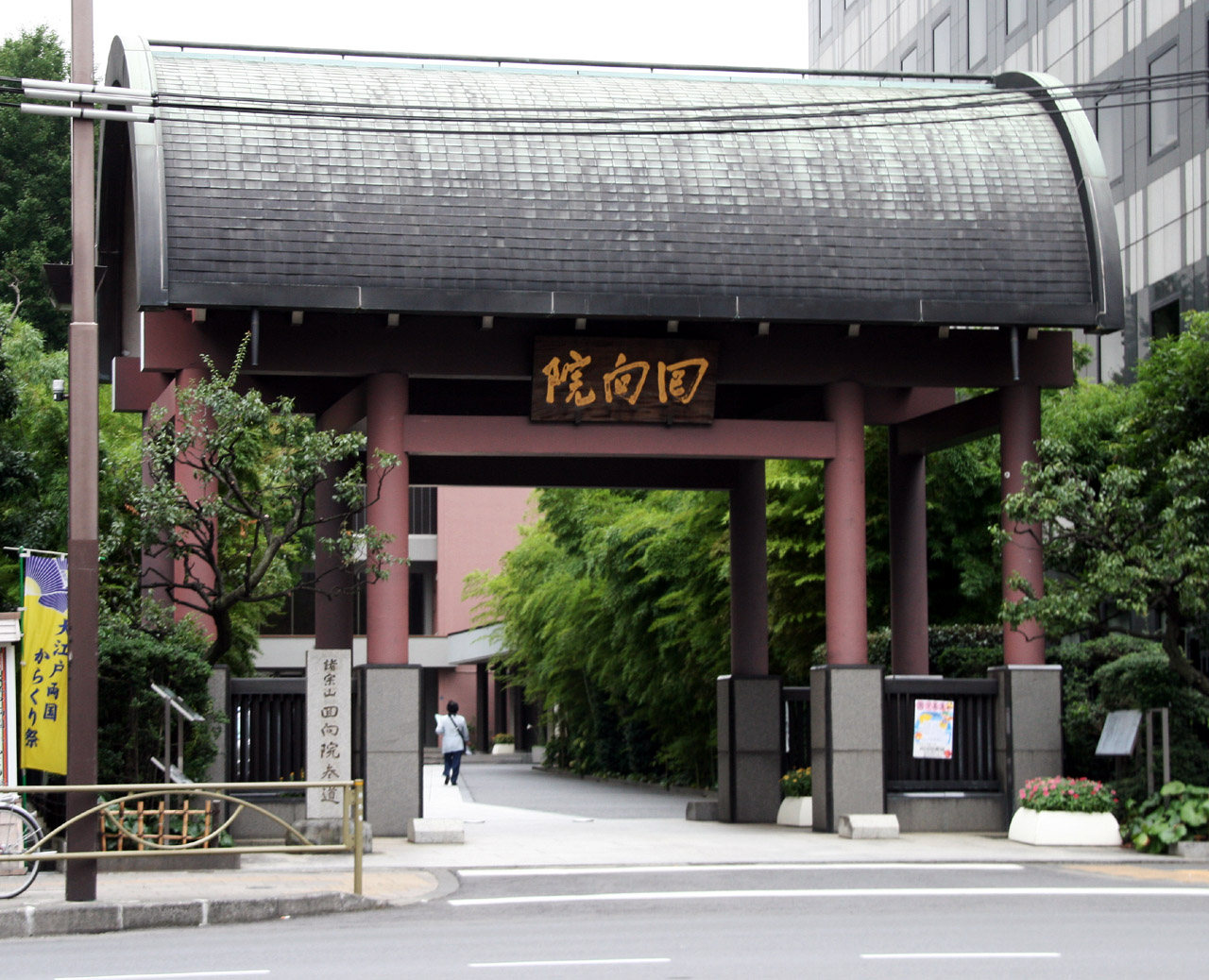
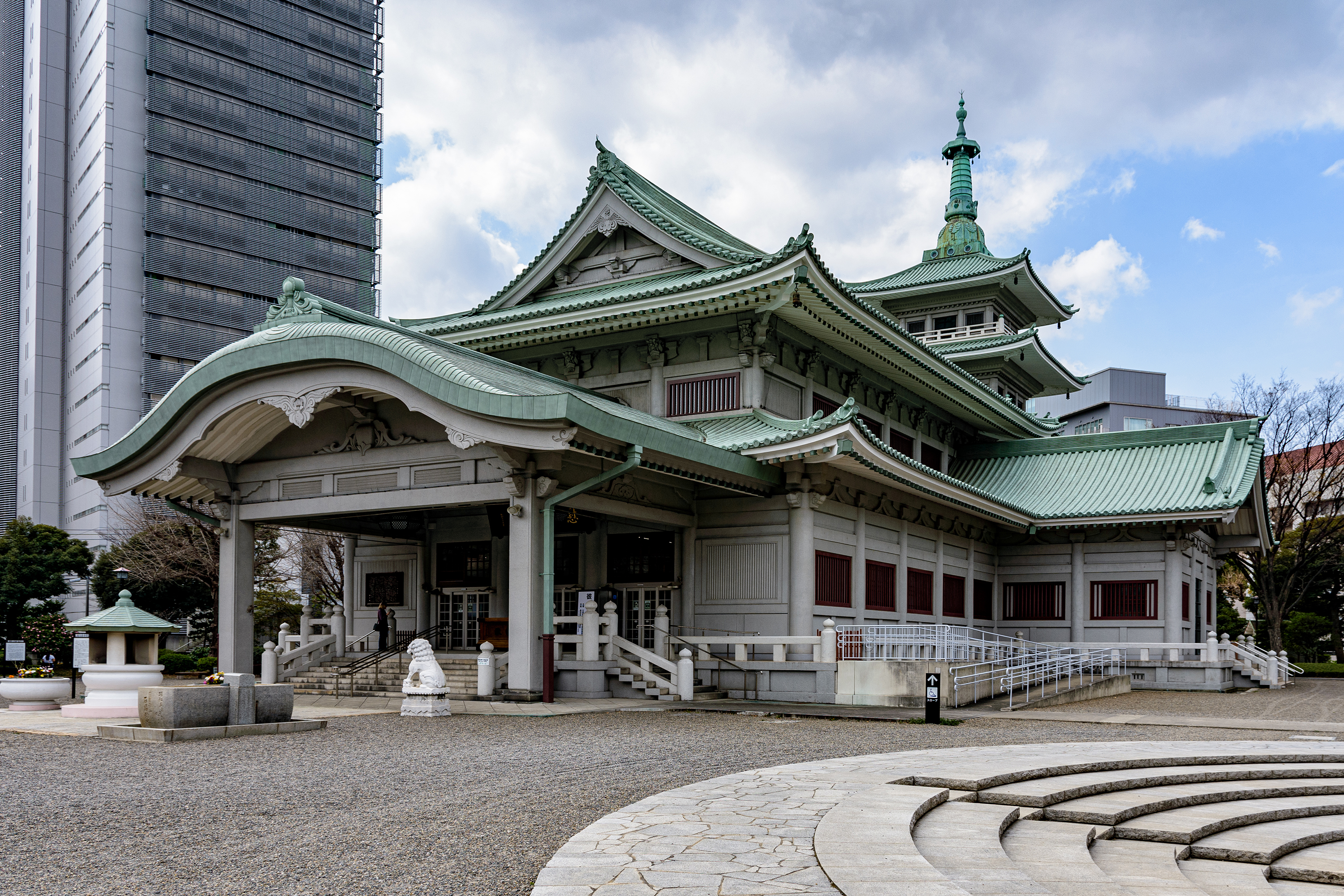
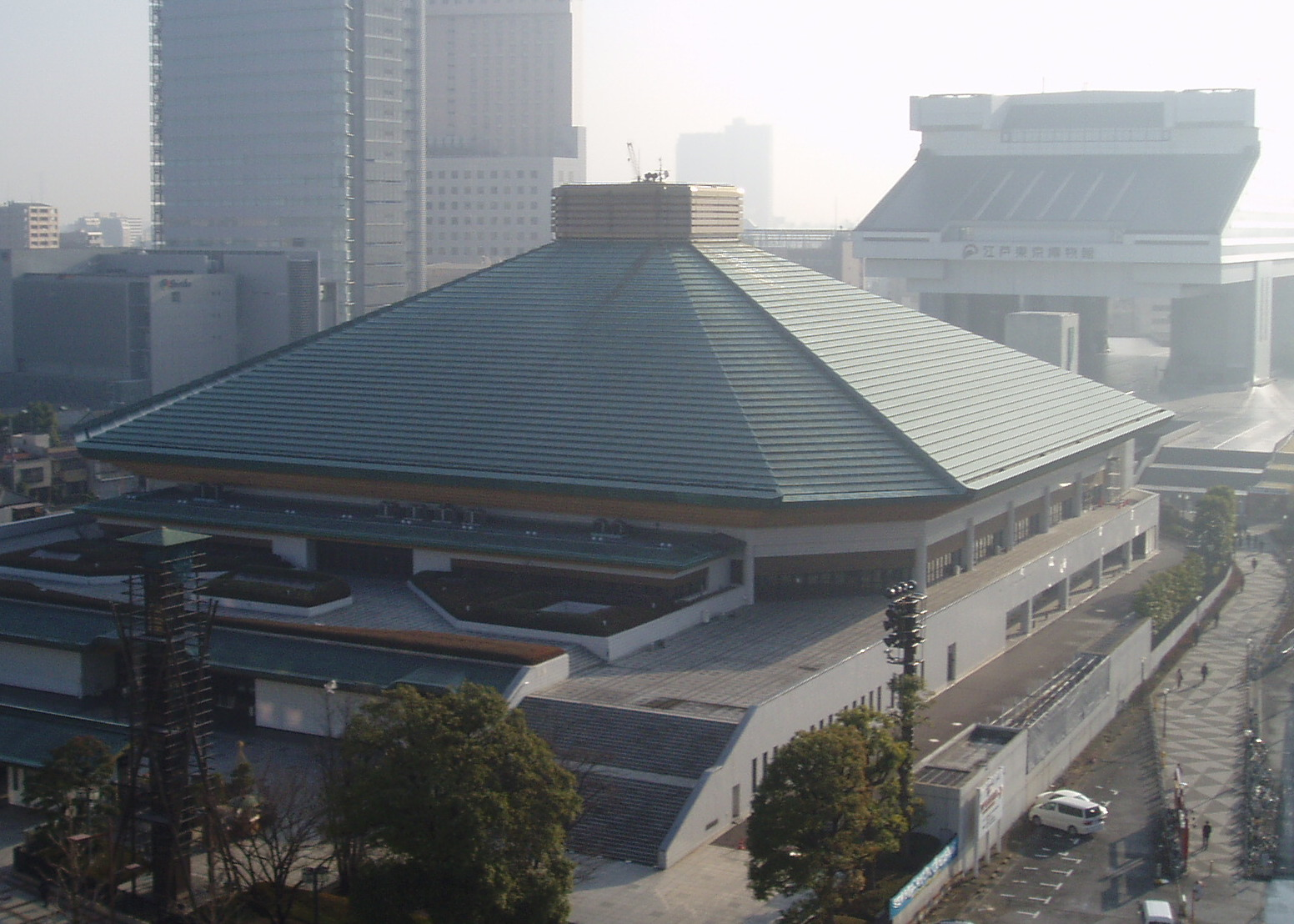
- Skyline of Sumida with the Sumida City Office, Tokyo Skytree, and Asahi Breweries Headquarters with the Asahi Flame Edo-Tokyo Museum Kinshichō Station Ekō-in Temple Tokyo Memorial Hall Ryōgoku Kokugikan

- Flag Seal

- Location of Sumida in Tokyo Metropolis

- Location in Japan
- Coordinates: 35°42′N 139°49′E
- Country: Japan
- Region: Kantō
- Prefecture: Tokyo Metropolis

Government
  - Mayor: Tōru Yamamoto

Area
  - Total: 13.77 km^{2} (5.32 sq mi)

Population (April 1, 2025)
  - Total: 287,766
  - Density: 19,759/km^{2} (51,180/sq mi)
- Time zone: UTC+09:00 (JST)
- City hall address: 1-23-20 Azumabashi, Sumida-ku, Tokyo; 130-8640
- Website: www.city.sumida.lg.jp
- Symbols
- Flower: Azalea
- Tree: Cherry blossom

Sumida (墨田区, Sumida-ku; Japanese pronunciation: [sɨ̀.mʲí.dä́(.kɯ̈̀), sɨ́.mʲì.dä̀]) is a special ward in the Tokyo Metropolis in Japan. The English translation of its Japanese self-designation is Sumida City.

As of 1 April 2025, the ward has an estimated population of 287,766 and a population density of 20,120 persons per km^{2}. Its total area is 13.77 km^{2}.

Sumida's city office is located in Azumabashi, while its commercial center is the area around Kinshicho Station in the south.

== Geography ==
Sumida is in the north-eastern part of the mainland portion of Tokyo. The Sumida and Arakawa are the major rivers, and form parts of its boundaries. Its neighbors are all special wards: Adachi to the north; Arakawa to the northwest; Katsushika to the east; Edogawa to the southeast; Taitō to the west; Chūō to the southwest; and Kōtō to the south.

=== Landmarks ===
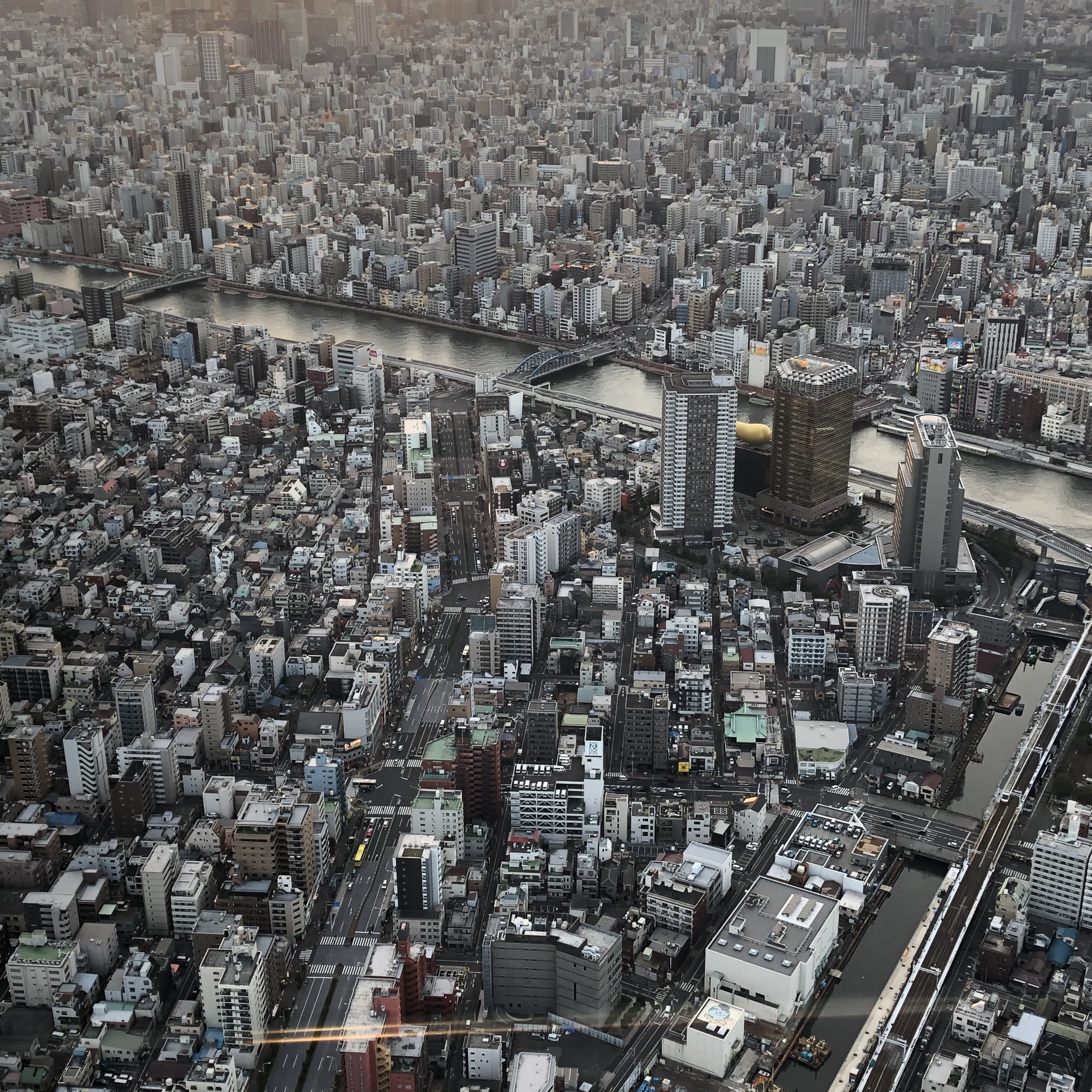
View of Sumida from the top of Tokyo Skytree

- Asahi Breweries headquarters: The Asahi Beer Hall, with the Asahi flame created by French designer Philippe Starck in 1989, is one of Tokyo's most recognizable modern structures.
- Edo-Tokyo Museum
- Eko-in: Buddhist temple
- Hokusai-dori (Hokusai Street), with a series of prints by famed Japanese artist Hokusai, who was born in the Kamezawa area of Sumida
- Honjo Matsuzaka-cho Park: the residence of Kira Yoshinaka stood on this site. The Forty-seven rōnin killed him during the Genroku era.
- Kinshicho Station
- Ryōgoku Kokugikan (National Sumo Stadium)
- Sumida Triphony Hall, concert hall
- Tobu Museum
- Tokyo Irei-do (Tokyo Memorial Hall): a memorial to unidentified people who died in the Great Kantō earthquake, the Bombing of Tokyo in World War II and other catastrophes; by Itō Chūta
- Tokyo Skytree: A digital terrestrial television broadcasting tower used by NHK and other broadcasters. It is the third tallest tower in the world and the tallest man-made structure in Japan. The Tokyo Solamachi (Tokyo Skytree Town) retail complex is adjacent to Skytree, with Sumida Aquarium on the 5th and 6th floors.
- Yokoamicho Park, in the Yokoami district

=== Places ===
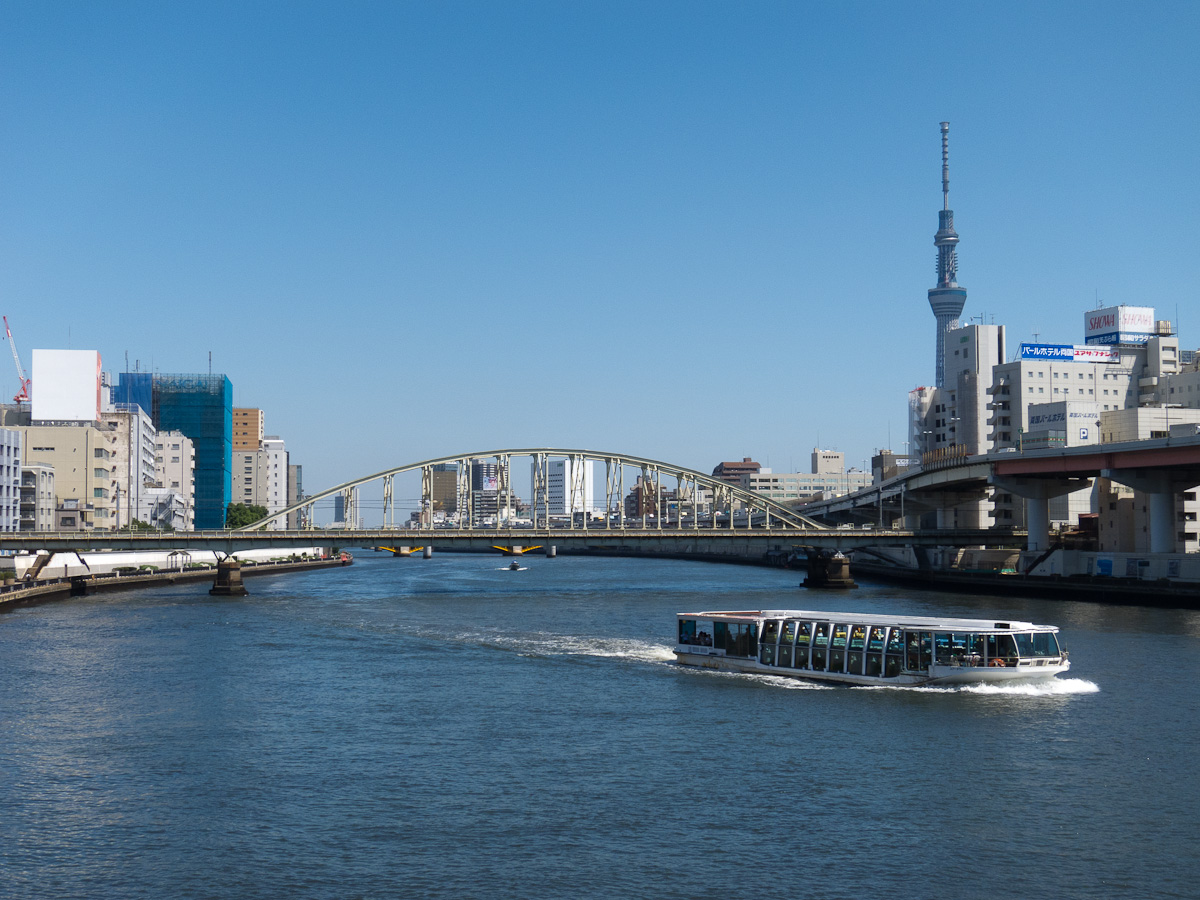
View of Sumida River from Ryogoku Bridge

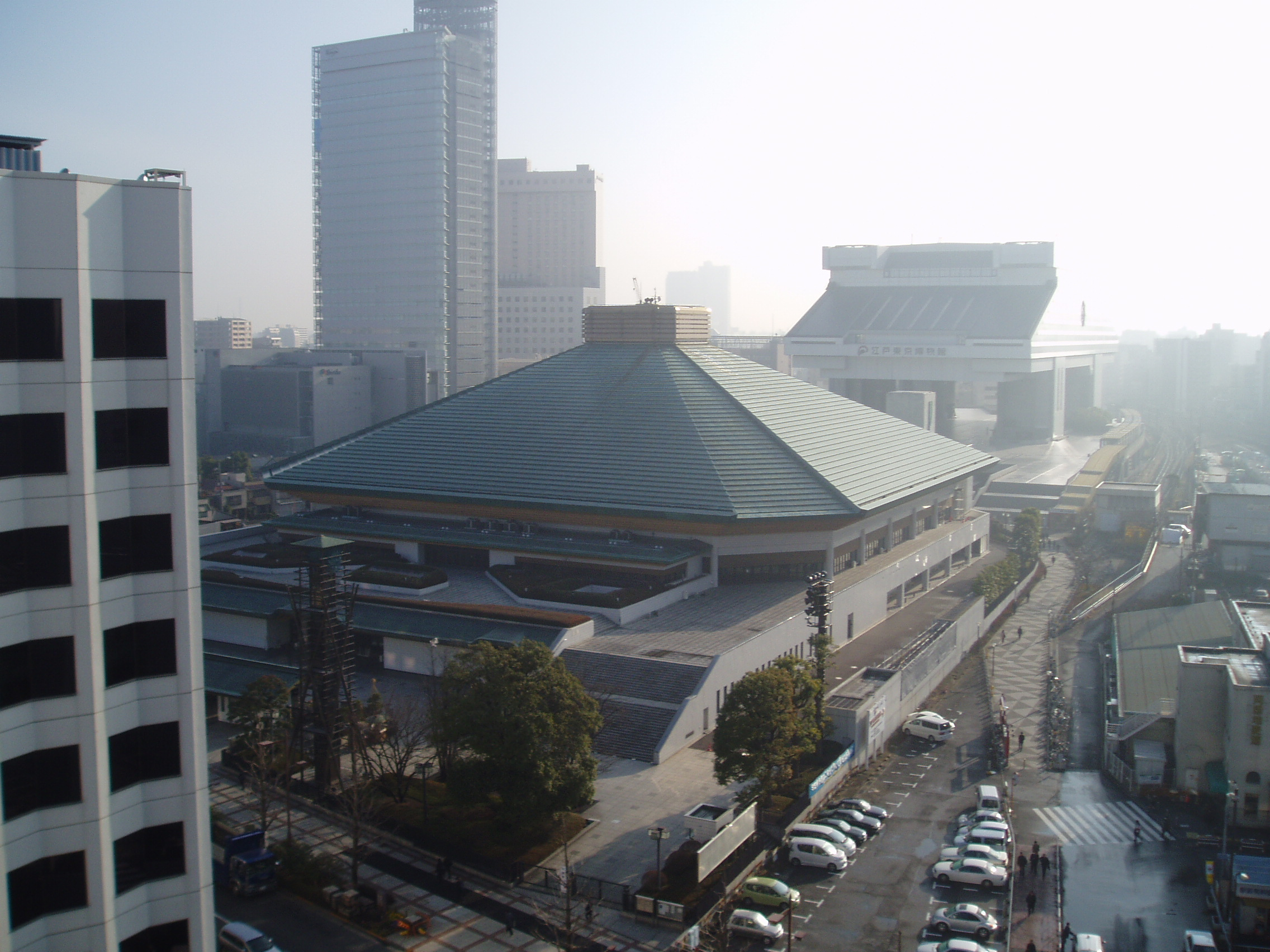
Ryogoku Sumo Arena

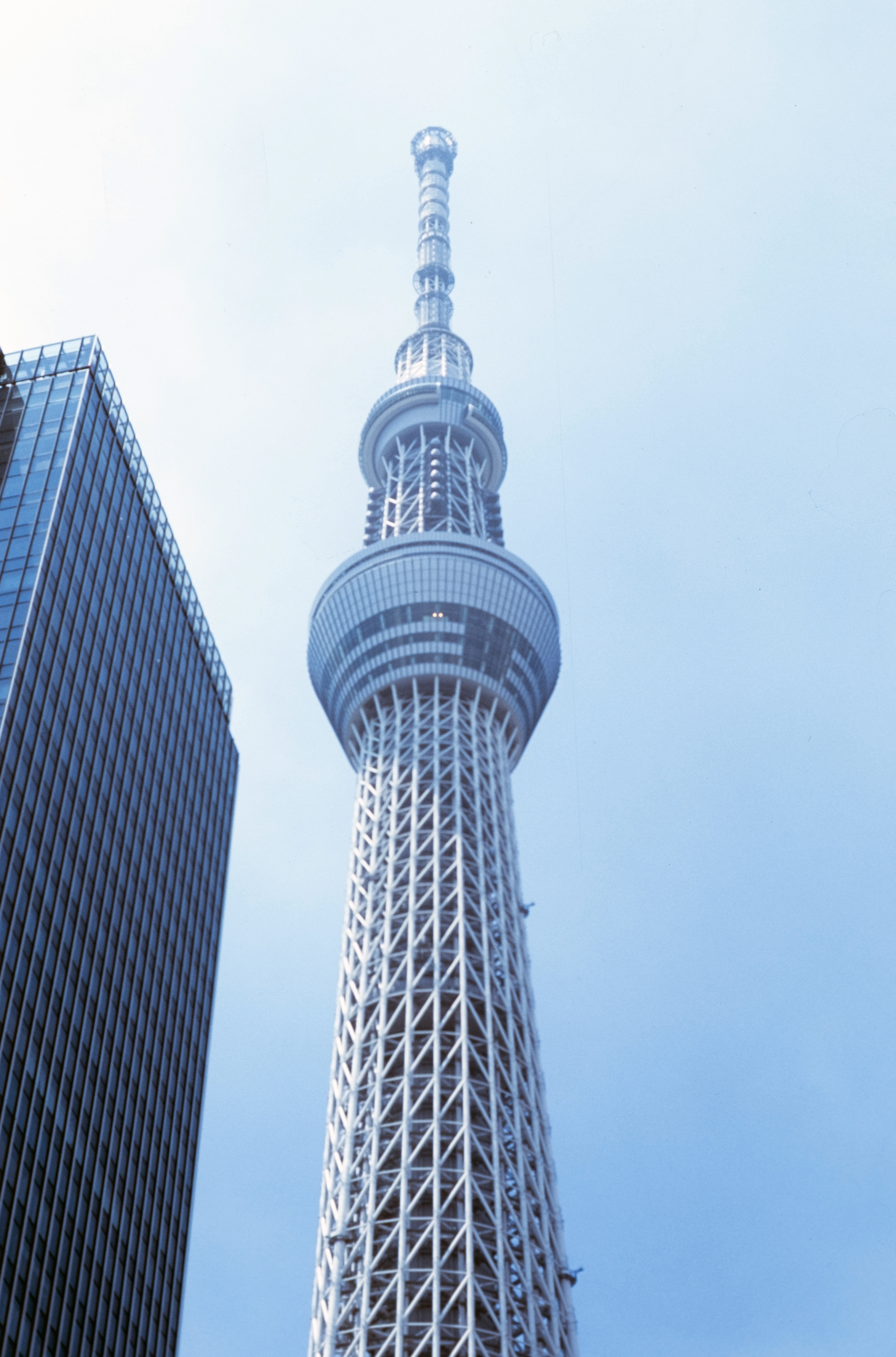
View from the southern side of the Skytree Tower

- In the north (the former Mukojima Ward): Sumida, Tsutsumi-dori, Higashi Sumida, Yahiro, Mukojima, Higashi Mukojima, Tachibana, Bunka, Kyojima, Oshiage
- In the center (former Honjo Ward): Azuma-bashi, Higashi Komagata, Honjo, Narihira, Yokokawa
- In the south (former Honjo Ward): Yokoami, Ryogoku, Chitose, Ishiwara, Kamezawa, Midori, Tatekawa, Kikukawa, Taihei, Kinshi, Koto-bashi

== History ==
The ward was founded on March 15, 1947. It was previously the (ordinary) wards Honjo and Mukojima. Mukojima, formed in 1932, contained the former town of Sumida, which along with the river gave the ward its name.

== Demographics ==
Historical population
Year	Pop.	±%
1920	320,695	—
1930	390,843	+21.9%
1940	479,809	+22.8%
1945	77,595	−83.8%
1950	236,242	+204.5%
1960	331,843	+40.5%
1970	281,237	−15.2%
1980	232,796	−17.2%
1990	222,944	−4.2%
2000	215,979	−3.1%
2010	247,606	+14.6%
2020	272,085	+9.9%
Source: Censuses (Note: For years prior to 1950, figures cover the area of present-day Sumida-ku.)

== Companies ==
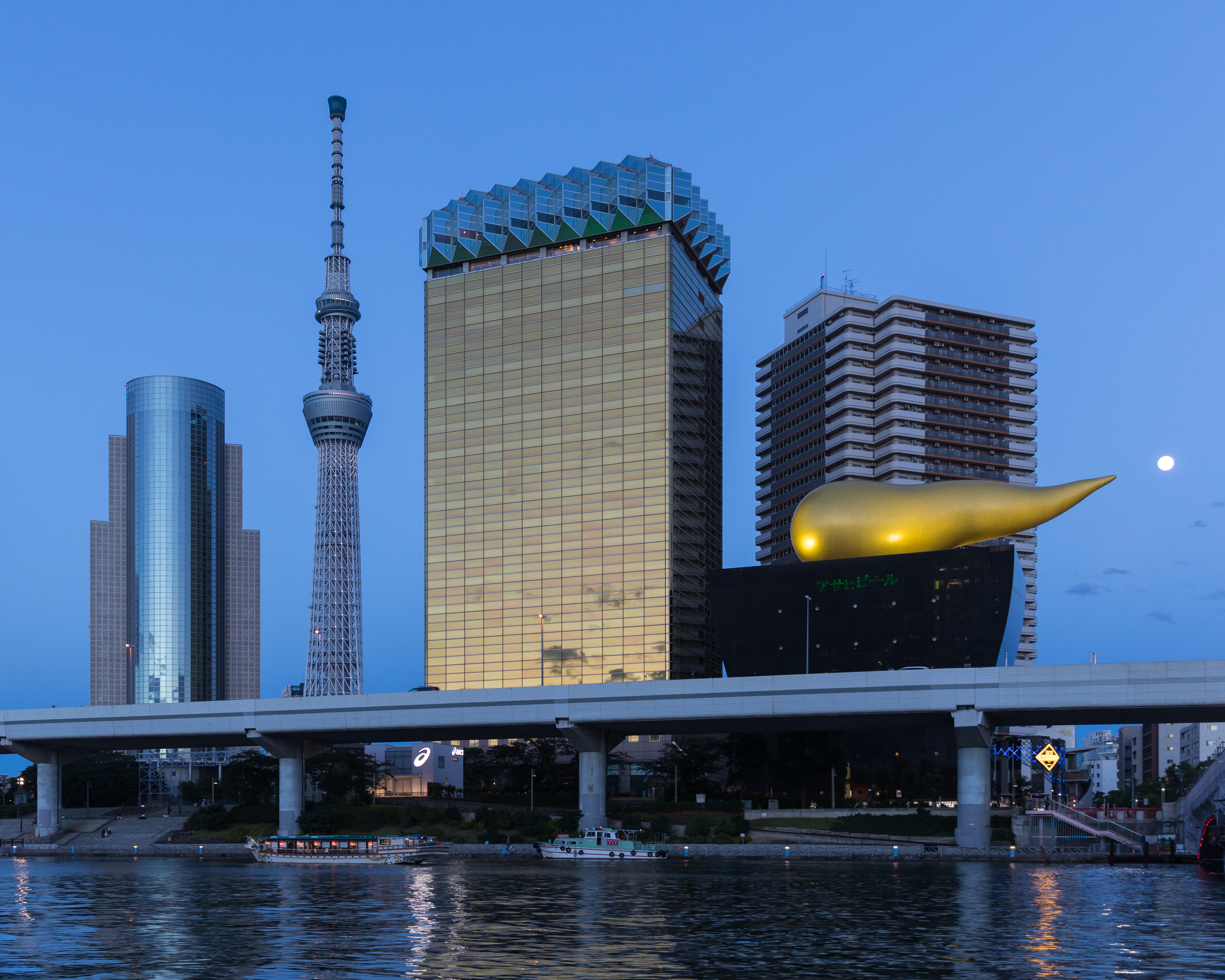
Asahi Breweries headquarters with the Asahi Flame and the Tokyo Skytree

- Asahi Breweries has its headquarters in Azuma-bashi.
- Japan Tobacco has a plant in Yokokawa.
- Keisei Electric Railway has its headquarters in Oshiage.
- Lion Corporation, the detergent and toiletries giant, has its home office in Honjo.
- Tobu Railway has its headquarters in Oshiage.

== Politics ==
As of 2023, the mayor is Tōru Yamamoto. The council consists of 34 members.

== Transport ==
=== Rail lines ===
- JR East Sōbu Main Line: Kinshichō, Ryōgoku Stations
- Tobu Railway
  - Tōbu Isesaki Line: Oshiage, Tokyo Skytree, Hikifune, Higashi-Mukōjima, Kanegafuchi Stations
  - Tōbu Kameido Line: Higashi-Azuma, Omurai, Hikifune Stations
- Keisei Electric Railway Keisei Oshiage Line: Oshiage, Keisei Hikifune, Yahiro Stations
- Tokyo Metro Hanzōmon Line: Kinshichō, Oshiage Stations
- Tokyo Metropolitan Bureau of Transportation
  - Toei Asakusa Line: Honjō Azuma-bashi, Oshiage Stations
  - Toei Shinjuku Line: Kikukawa Station
  - Toei Ōedo Line: Ryōgoku Station

=== Railway stations ===
- Higashi-Azuma Station
- Higashi-Mukōjima Station
- Hikifune Station
- Honjo-Azumabashi Station
- Kanegafuchi Station
- Kinshichō Station
- Kikukawa Station
- Tokyo Skytree Station
- Omurai Station
- Oshiage Station
- Ryōgoku Station
- Yahiro Station

=== Notable railway stations ===
- Kinshicho Station: A major commercial hub served by the JR Sobu Line and Tokyo Metro Hanzomon Line.
- Oshiage Station (Skytree-mae): Serves four lines including the Tokyo Metro Hanzomon Line, Keisei Oshiage Line, and provides access to the Tokyo Skytree.
- Ryogoku Station: Located near Ryogoku Kokugikan (sumo arena), served by the JR Sobu Line and Toei Oedo Line.

=== Highways ===
- Shuto Expressway
  - C2 Central Loop
  - No. 6 Mukōjima Route
  - No. 7 Komatsugawa Route
- National highways
  - Route 6
  - Route 14

== Education ==
Metropolitan high schools are operated by the Tokyo Metropolitan Government Board of Education.

- Honjo High School
- Mukojima Commercial High School
- Mukojima Technical High School
- Nihonbashi High School
- Ryogoku High School
- Sumidagawa High School
- Tachibana High School

In addition, the metropolitan school district also operates a metropolitan junior high school:

- Ryogoku Junior High School

Municipal kindergartens, elementary schools, and junior high schools are operated by Sumida City Board of Education (墨田区教育委員会).

Municipal junior high schools:

- Azumadaini ("Azuma No. 2") Junior High School (吾嬬第二中学校)
- Azumamatchibana Junior High School (吾嬬立花中学校)
- Bunka Junior High School (文花中学校)
- Honjyo Junior High School (本所中学校)
- Kinshi Junior High School (錦糸中学校)
- Ryogoku Junior High School (両国中学校)
- Sakuratsutsumi Junior High School (桜堤中学校)
- Sumida Junior High School (墨田中学校)
- Tatekawa Junior High School (竪川中学校)
- Terashima Junior High School (寺島中学校)

Municipal elementary schools:

- No. 1 Terajima (第一寺島小学校)
- No. 2 Terajima (第二寺島小学校)
- No. 3 Azuma (第三吾嬬小学校)
- No. 3 Terajima (第三寺島小学校)
- No. 4 Azuma (第四吾嬬小学校)
- Chuwa (中和小学校)
- Futaba (二葉小学校)
- Higashiazuma (東吾嬬小学校)
- Hikifune (曳舟小学校)
- Kikukawa (菊川小学校)
- Kinshi (錦糸小学校)
- Kototoi (言問小学校)
- Koume (小梅小学校)
- Midori (緑小学校)
- Nakagawa (中川小学校)
- Narihira (業平小学校)
- Oshiage (押上小学校)
- Ryogoku (両国小学校)
- Sotode (外手小学校)
- Sumida (隅田小学校)
- Tachibana Azuma-no-Mori (立花吾嬬の森小学校)
- Umekawa (梅若小学校)
- Yahiro (八広小学校)
- Yanagashima (柳島小学校)
- Yokokawa (横川小学校)

Municipal kindergartens:

- Daisanterajima ("No. 3 Terajima") (第三寺島幼稚園)
- Hikifune (曳舟幼稚園)
- Kikukawa (菊川幼稚園)
- Midori (緑幼稚園)
- Tachibana (立花幼稚園)
- Yahiro (八広幼稚園)
- Yanagishima (柳島幼稚園)

International schools:

- Tokyo Korean 5th Elementary and Middle School (東京朝鮮第五初中級学校) - North Korean school

== Notable people ==
=== Historical ===
- Ryūnosuke Akutagawa lived in Mukojima
- Enomoto Takeaki lived in Mukojima
- Katsushika Hokusai was born in Kamezawa
- Katsu Kaishū was born in Kamezawa
- Kōda Rohan lived in Mukōjima
- Matsuo Bashō lived in Honjō
- Mori Ōgai lived in Mukōjima
- Nezumi Kozō (Jirokichi): a memorial is located at Eko-in

=== Modern ===
- Haruka Igawa: actress, model
- Chosuke Ikariya: actor, comedian (The Drifters)
- Nana Kinomi: actress
- Masakazu Morita, voice actor
- Masao Ohba: former WBA flyweight champion
- Sadaharu Oh: baseball player and manager
- Kazuhito Tadano: Major League Baseball player
- Suihō Tagawa: manga artist
- Tetsuya Chiba: manga artist
- Hisanori Takahashi: baseball player
- Tomomi Takano: model and professional boxer
- Yoshihiro Takayama: pro wrestler
- Chisa Yokoyama: voice actor
- Shunsuke Kazama, actor, voice actor and tarento

== International relations ==
Sumida maintains sister-city relationships with Seodaemun-gu, Seoul, South Korea, and with Shijingshan District, Beijing, China.

== Works set in Sumida ==
- Chushingura, the fictional account of the events surrounding the revenge of the Forty-seven Ronin
- Bokuto Kitan, the novel by Nagai Kafu
- You're Under Arrest manga series
- Battle Kuma Oni. in Kachidoki Bridge 「東京激震! 新生莫斯科華撃団! Tōkyō Gekishin! Shinsei Mosukuba Kagekidan!」 Tokyo Trembles! The New Moscow Combat Revue! in Oji Hiroi's 2000 Sakura Wars TV Series Shin Sakura Taisen the Animation, 2020
- Lycoris Recoil anime series
- Paranormasight: The Seven Mysteries of Honjo, the horror visual novel directed and written by Takanari Ishiyama and published by Square Enix, 2023
