= Tobu Kameido Line =

Railway line in Tokyo, Japan

Kameido Line

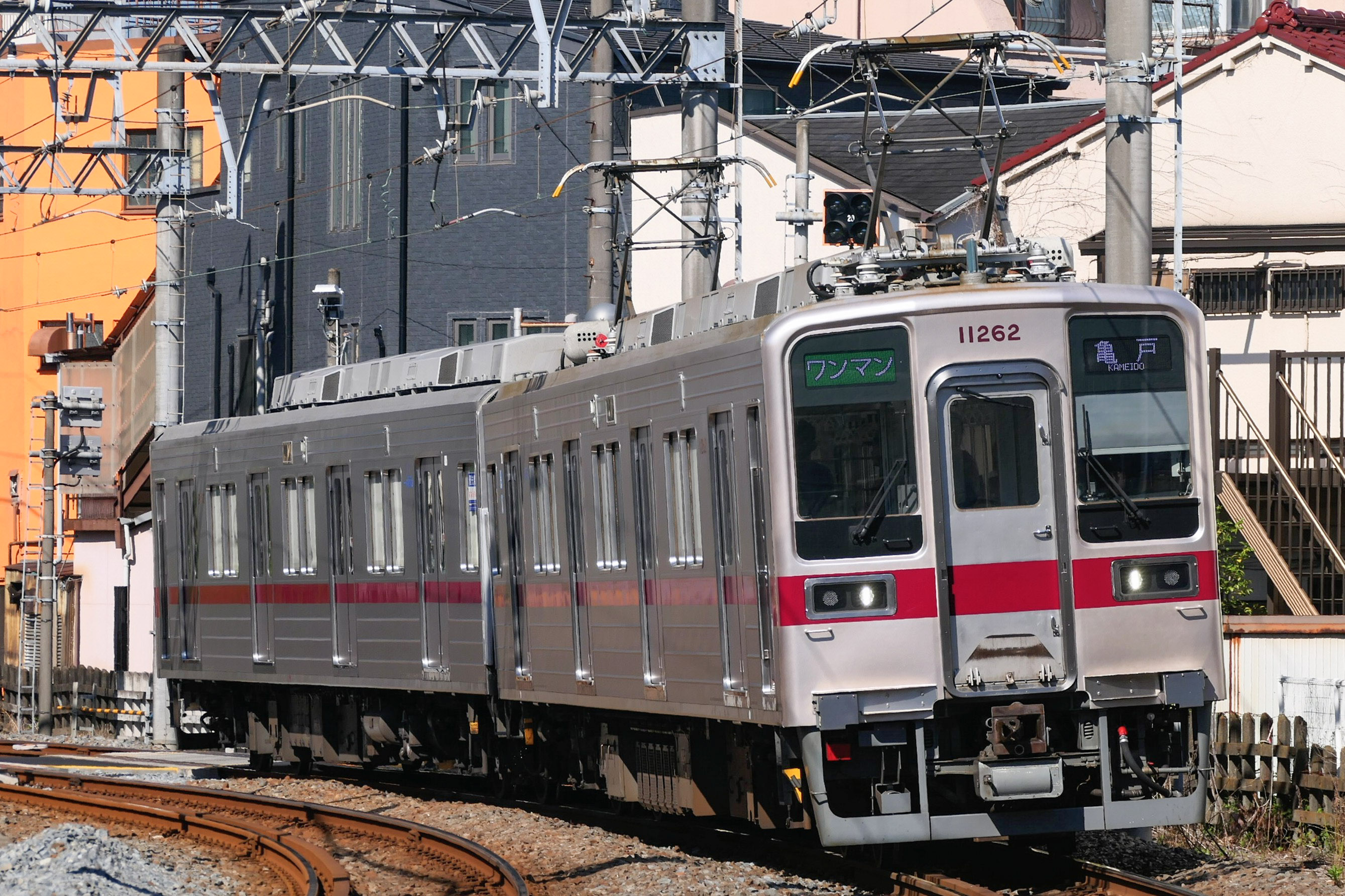
- A Tobu 10030 series set running between Kameidosuijin and Kameido stations, 21 July 2025

Overview
- Native name: 亀戸線
- Status: In service
- Owner: Tobu Railway Co., Ltd.
- Locale: Tokyo
- Termini: Kameido; Hikifune
- Stations: 5

Service
- Type: Commuter rail
- System: Tobu Railway
- Route number: TS
- Operator(s): Tobu Railway Co., Ltd.
- Rolling stock: Tobu 10000 series

History
- Opened: 5 April 1904; 122 years ago

Technical
- Line length: 3.4 km (2.1 mi)
- Num of tracks: Double-track
- Track gauge: 1,067 mm (3 ft 6 in)
- Minimum radius: 160 m (520 ft)
- Electrification: 1,500 V DC (overhead catenary)
- Operating speed: 65 km/h (40 mph)
- Signalling: Automatic closed block
- Train protection system: Tobu ATS

The Kameido Line (亀戸線, Kameido-sen) is a railway line operated by Japanese private railway company Tobu Railway in Tokyo. The line is in central Tokyo, a short 3.4 km branch off the Tobu Skytree Line at Hikifune, southbound to Kameido with connections to the JR East Chūō-Sōbu Line.

== Operations ==
Since 2025, the line is served by two-car 10000 series formations operating as all-stations "Local" services, with no through trains to the Tobu Skytree Line. All services are one-man.

== Stations ==
No.	Name	Japanese	Distance (km)	Connections	Location
TS04	Hikifune	曳舟	0.0	Tobu Skytree Line (TS04)	Sumida, Tokyo
TS41	Omurai	小村井	1.4		Sumida, Tokyo
TS42	Higashi-Azuma	東あずま	2.0		Sumida, Tokyo
TS43	Kameido Suijin	亀戸水神	2.7		Kōtō, Tokyo
TS44	Kameido	亀戸	3.4	Chūō–Sōbu Line (JB23)	Kōtō, Tokyo

== Rolling stock ==
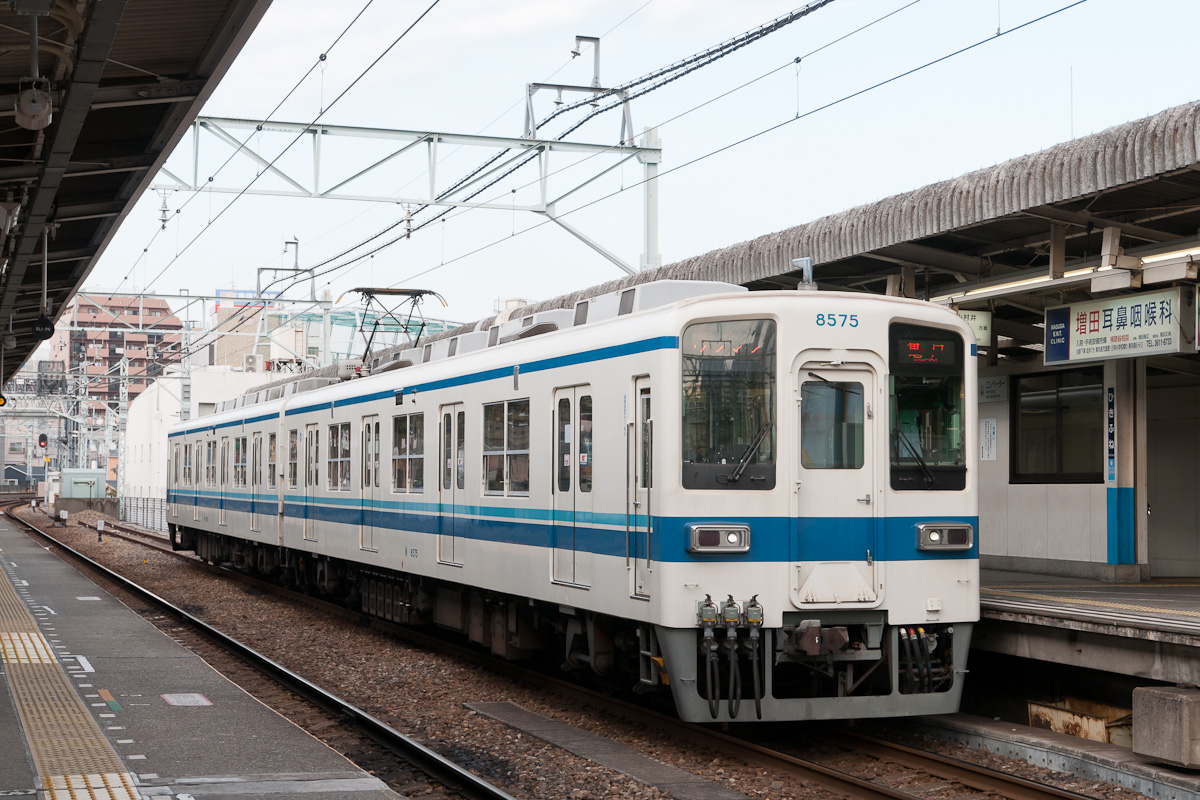
A two-car 8000 series set at Hikifune Station in April 2011

Services on the line are operated using a fleet of three two-car 10000 series EMU trains. Until 2025, the line was operated by 8000 series sets.

=== Revival liveries ===
From 23 March 2016, two-car set 8577, used on the Tobu Kameido Line and Tobu Daishi Line, received the "international orange" and "medium yellow" livery carried by 7300 and 7800 series trains between 1958 and 1964.

From 16 February 2017, two-car set 8568, used on the Tobu Kameido Line and Tobu Daishi Line, received the green and "jasmine white" livery carried experimentally by one 7860 series train in the 1950s.

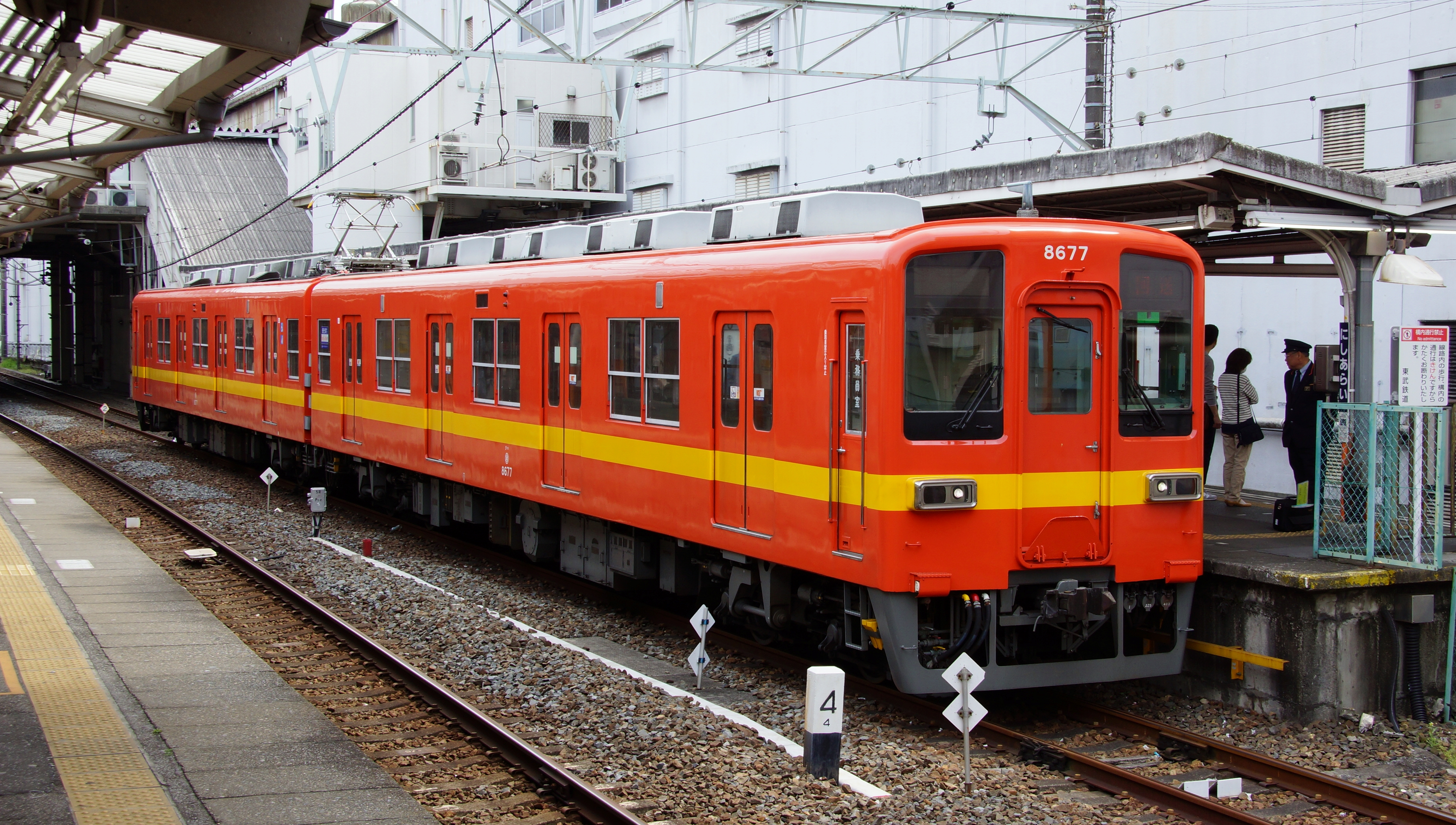
Orange-liveried 8000 series set 8577 in April 2016

Orange-liveried 8000 series train on the tracks in April 2016

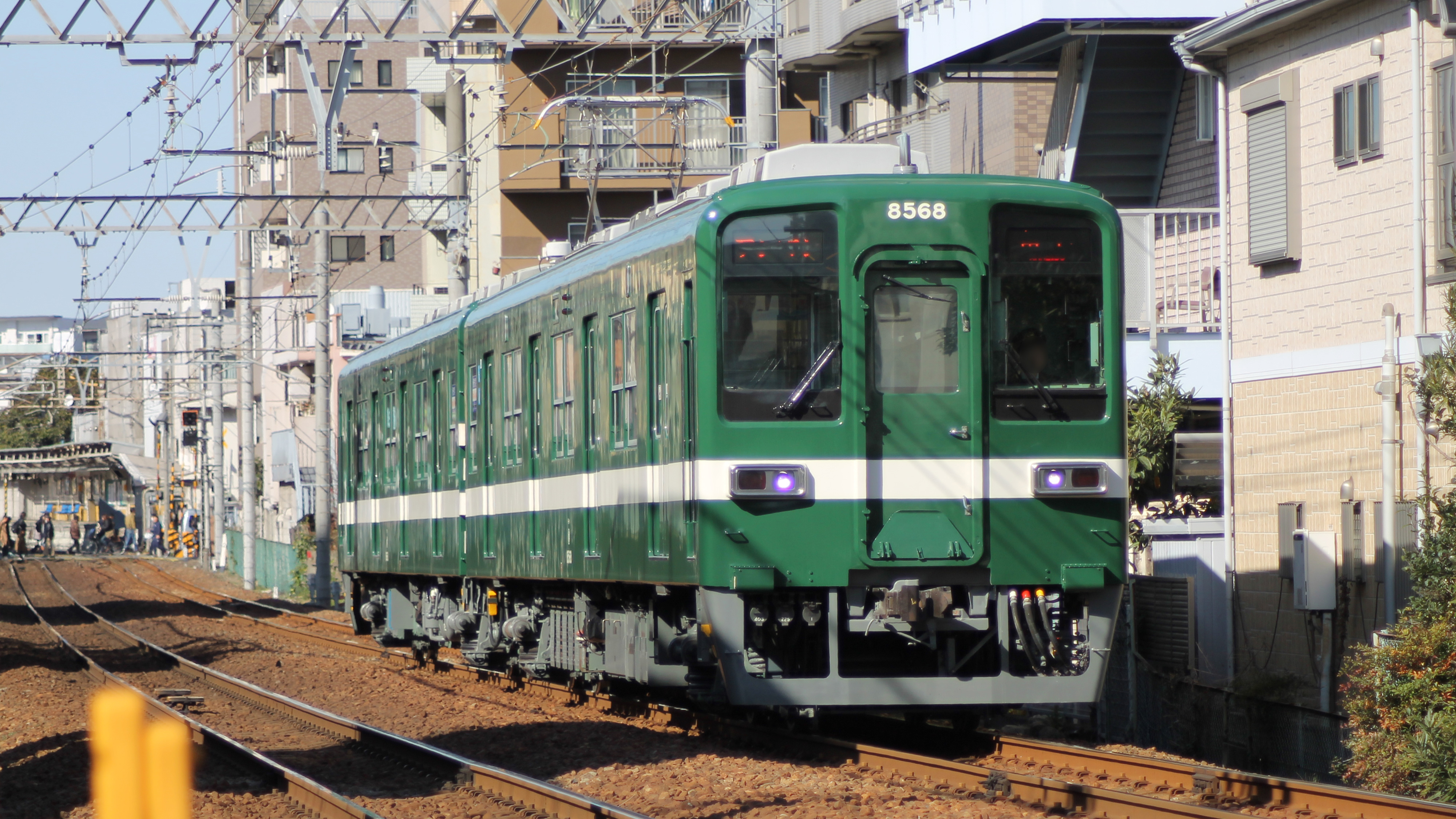
Green-liveried 8000 series set 8568 in February 2017

=== Future plans ===
In 2027, 10000 series which run on Tobu Kameido Line will be replaced by Tobu 1000 series which is corresponded to One-person operation.

== History ==
The line opened on 5 April 1904.

From 17 March 2012, station numbering was introduced on all Tobu lines. Tobu Kameido Line stations were numbered prefixed with the letters "TS".
