= Tokyo Skytree Station =

Railway station in Tokyo, Japan

Coordinates: 35.7099°N 139.8094°E

TS02 Tokyo Skytree Station とうきょうスカイツリー駅
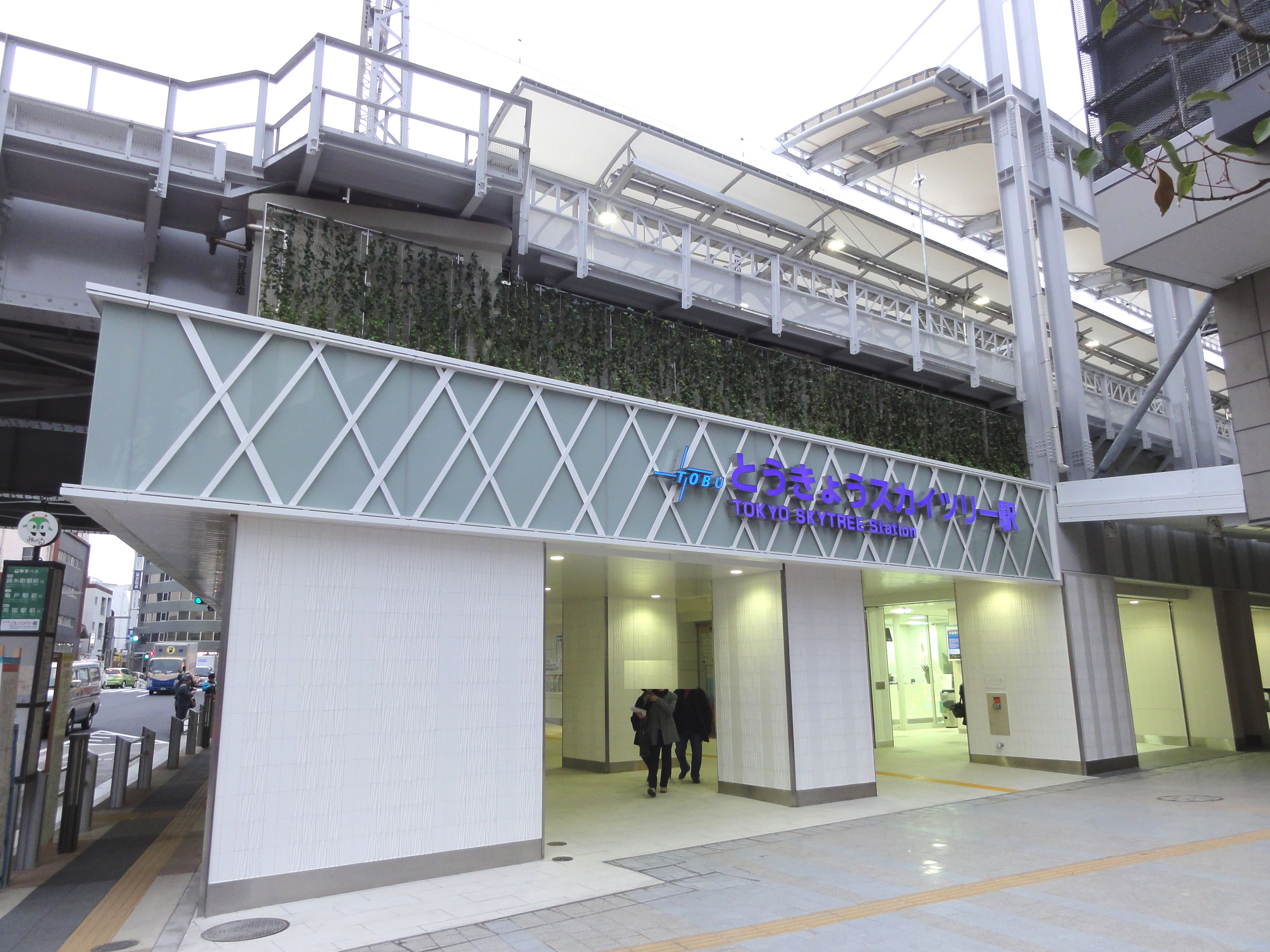
- Station entrance in 2012

General information
- Location: 1-1-4 Oshiage, Sumida-ku, Tokyo; Japan
- Operator: Tobu Railway
- Line: Tobu Skytree Line

Other information
- Station code: TS-02

History
- Opened: 1902
- Former names: Azumabashi; Narihirabashi (until 2012)

Passengers
- FY2024: 60,055 daily boardings

Services
Preceding station	Tobu Railway	Following station
Asakusa TS01 Terminus	Spacia X	Kita-Senju TS09 towards Tōbu–Nikkō or Kinugawa–Onsen
Asakusa TS01 Terminus	Kegon	Hikifune TS04 towards Tōbu–Nikkō
Asakusa TS01 Terminus	Kinu	Hikifune TS04 towards Kinugawa–Onsen
Asakusa TS01 Terminus	Aizu	Kita-Senju TS09 towards Shin-Fujiwara
Asakusa TS01 Terminus	Ryomo	Hikifune TS04 towards Kuzū, Akagi or Isesaki
Asakusa TS01 Terminus	Skytree Liner	Hikifune TS04 towards Kasukabe
Asakusa One-way operation	Urban Park Liner from Asakusa	Hikifune TS04 towards Ōmiya or Kashiwa
Asakusa TS01 Terminus	Tobu Skytree Line Section Express Section Semi Express Local	Hikifune TS04 towards Tōbu-Dōbutsu-Kōen
Location
- Location within Tokyo Location within Japan

Tokyo Skytree Station (とうきょうスカイツリー駅, Tōkyō Sukaitsurī-eki; officially stylized as TOKYO SKYTREE Station) is a railway station on the Tobu Skytree Line in Sumida, Tokyo, Japan, operated by the private railway operator Tobu Railway. It is adjacent to the Tokyo Skytree and Skytree Town redevelopment, and was formerly known as Narihirabashi Station.

== Lines ==
Tokyo Skytree Station is served by the Tobu Skytree Line from Asakusa, and is 1.1 km from the line's Asakusa terminus.

== Station layout ==
The station consists of one island platform serving two tracks.

=== Platforms ===
1	Tobu Skytree Line	for Asakusa
2	Tobu Skytree Line	for Kita-Senju, Ōmiya, Kasukabe, Tōbu-Dōbutsu-Kōen, Kuki, and Minami-Kurihashi

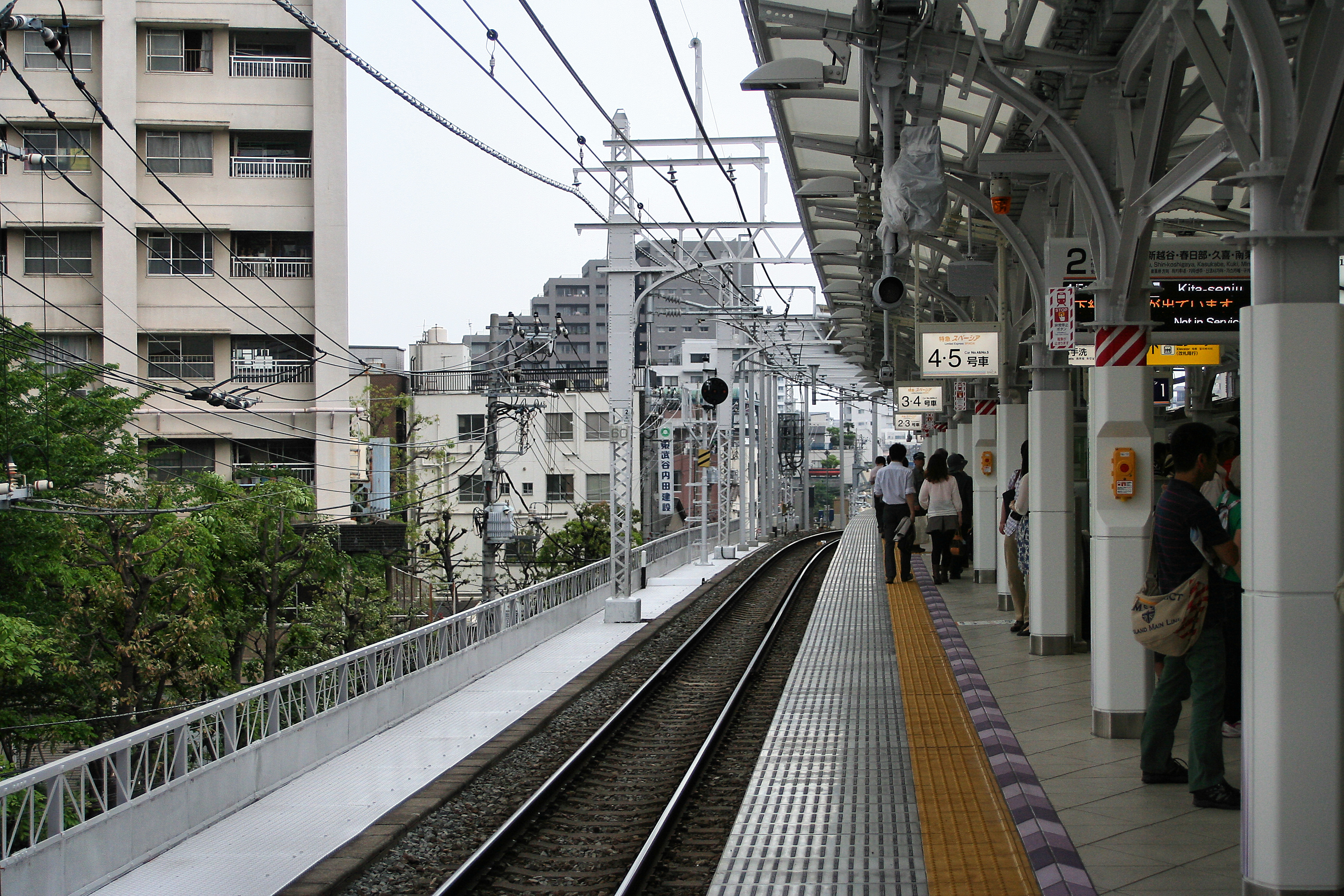
Platform 2 looking east, May 2012

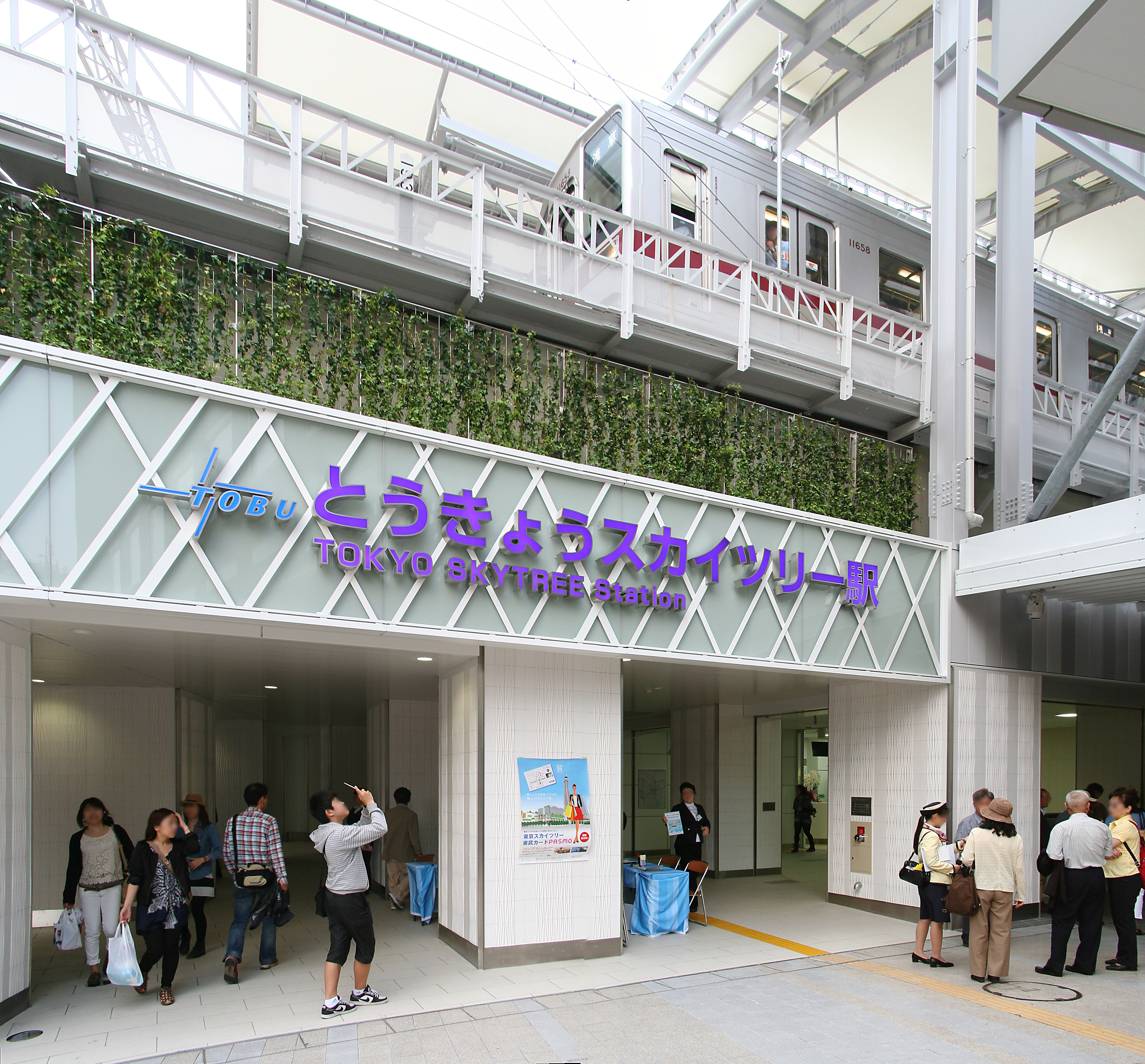
The station entrance in May 2012

== Adjacent stations ==
All kinds of the limited express excluding Skytree Liner and Urban Park Liner stop at Hikifune Station as the next or previous station at only the morning and evening. At the noon, all of the limited express except Skytree Liner and Urban Park Liner stop at Kita-Senju Station as the next or previous station.

== History ==
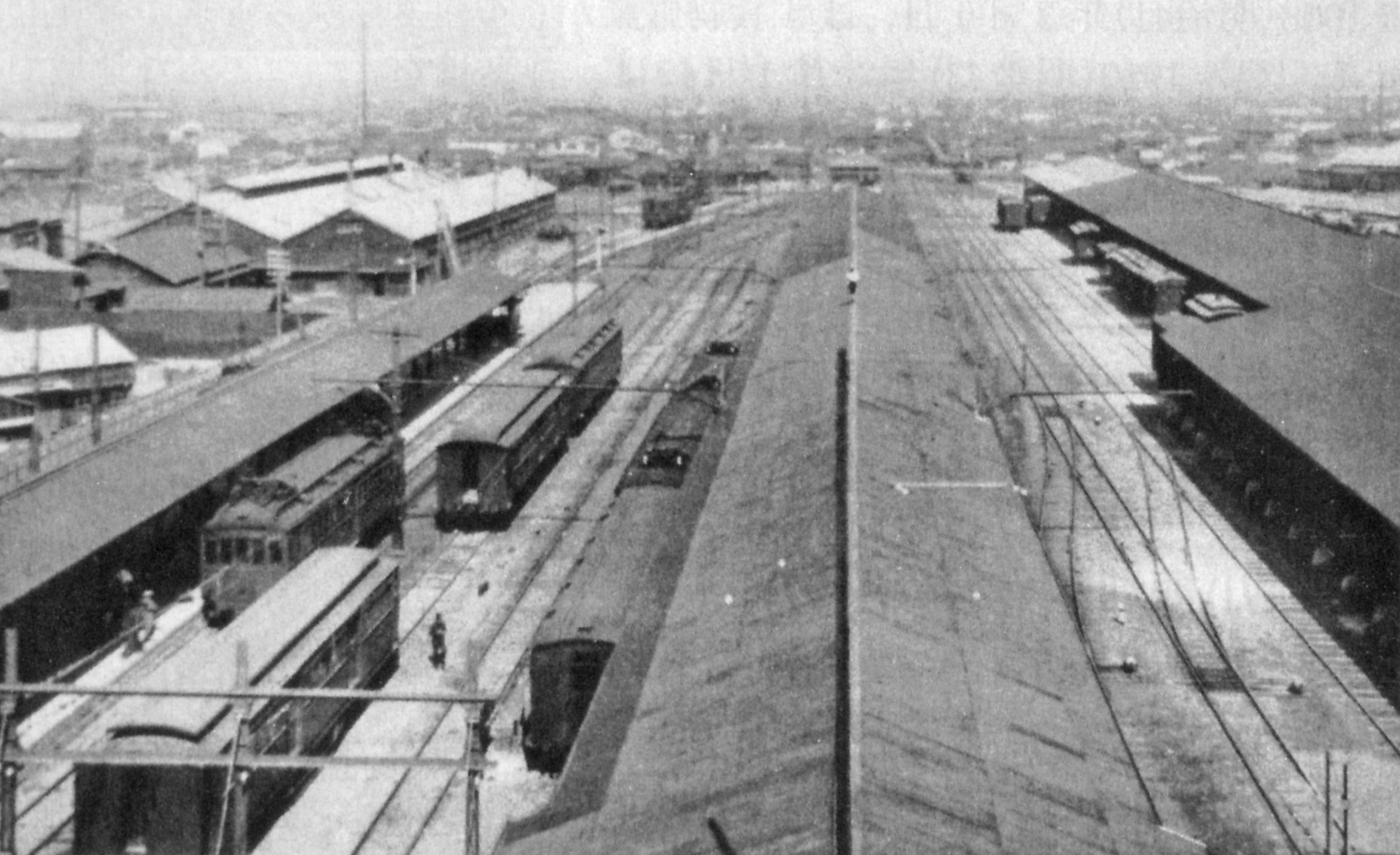
Overview of the original Asakusa Station terminus in 1927

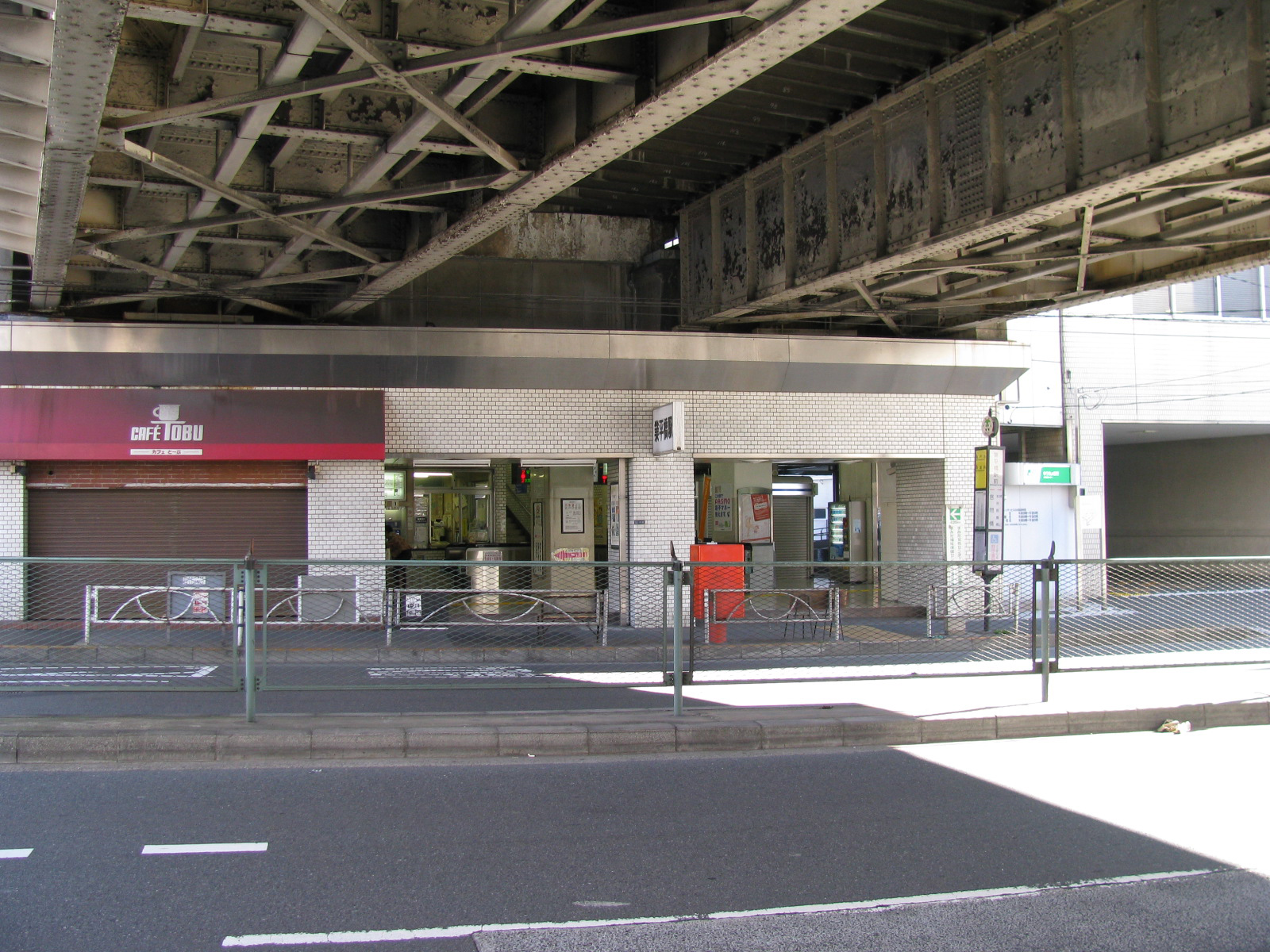
The entrance of Narihirabashi Station, January 2008

The station first opened on 1 April 1902 as Azumabashi Station (吾妻橋駅, Azumabashi-eki). The station closed from 5 April 1904, but reopened on 1 March 1908. On 1 March 1910, the station was renamed Asakusa Station (浅草駅, Asakusa-eki). On 25 May 1931, this was renamed Narihirabashi Station (業平橋駅, Narihirabashi-eki).

=== Redevelopment and renaming ===
Narihirabashi Station was renamed Tokyo Skytree Station from 17 March 2012, ahead of the opening of the Tokyo Skytree and adjoining Skytree Town shopping and office complex on 22 May 2012. From this date, all up limited express (Spacia, Ryōmō, and Shimotsuke) services and four down Spacia Kinu services stop at the station. The rebuilt and enlarged station was opened on 20 April 2012, with the concourse area increased from approximately 60 m^{2} to 700 m^{2}.

From the same day, station numbering was introduced on all Tobu lines, with Tokyo Skytree Station becoming "TS-02".

On 27 November 2022, a new elevated platform was opened for southbound trains headed for Asakusa Station. This was part of the 2017‍–‍2024 project of elevating the tracks in order to eliminate a level crossing, closed in March 2025, to the east of the SkyTree complex. The station was elevated and relocated 150 meters to the east. Instead of one island platform with two tracks, the new station has 3 tracks, an island platform, and a side platform.

== Passenger statistics ==
In fiscal 2024, the station was used by an average of 60,055 passengers daily (boarding passengers only).

== Surrounding area ==
- Tokyo Skytree
- Sumida Aquarium
- Tobu Railway Head Office

=== Other stations ===
- Oshiage Station ( Tokyo Metro Hanzōmon Line) (approximately 10 minutes' walk and 1 stop away on the railway)
- Honjo-azumabashi Station ( Toei Asakusa Line)

== See also ==
- List of railway stations in Japan
