= Kameido Station =

Railway station in Tokyo, Japan

Coordinates: 35.6977°N 139.8264°E

JB23 TS44 Kameido Station 亀戸駅
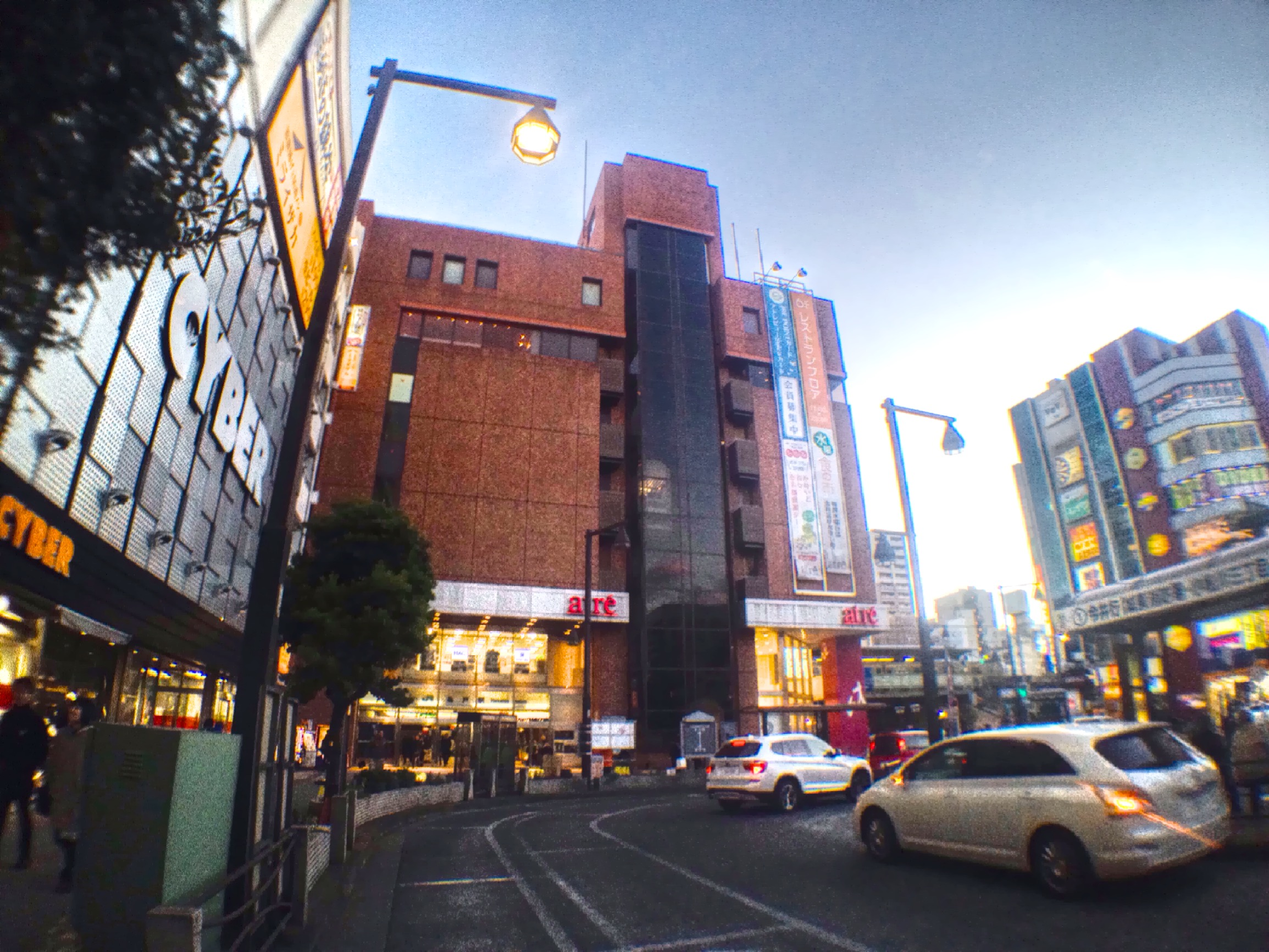
- Station building, December 2017

General information
- Location: Kōtō, Tokyo; Japan
- Operator: JR East; Tobu Railway
- Lines: Chūō-Sōbu Line; Tobu Kameido Line

Other information
- Station code: JB23 (Chūō-Sōbu Line); TS44 (Tobu Kameido Line)

History
- Opened: 1894

Services
Preceding station	JR East	Following station
Kinshichō JB22 towards Mitaka	Chūō–Sōbu Line	Hirai JB24 towards Chiba
Preceding station	Tobu Railway	Following station
Terminus	Kameido Line	Kameidosuijin TS43 towards Hikifune
Location

Kameido Station (亀戸駅, Kameido-eki) is a railway station in Kōtō, Tokyo, Japan, operated by East Japan Railway Company (JR East) and the private railway operator Tobu Railway.

== Lines ==
Kameido Station is served by the JR East Chūō-Sōbu Line and the 3.4 km Tobu Kameido Line from Hikifune.

== Station layout ==
=== JR East platforms ===
1	Chūō-Sōbu Line	for Akihabara, Shinjuku, Nakano, and Mitaka
2	Chūō-Sōbu Line	for Nishi-Funabashi, Tsudanuma, and Chiba

=== Tobu platforms ===
This station consists of an island platform serving two tracks.

1-2	Tobu Kameido Line	for Hikifune

== History ==
The JR station (originally on the Sōbu Railway) opened on December 1, 1894. The Tobu Kameido Line station opened on April 5, 1904.

== Surrounding area ==
- Kameido Tenjinja Shrine
- Yomiuri College of Car Mechanics
