= Hikifune Station =

Railway station in Tokyo, Japan

Coordinates: 35.7187°N 139.8170°E

TS04 Hikifune Station 曳舟駅
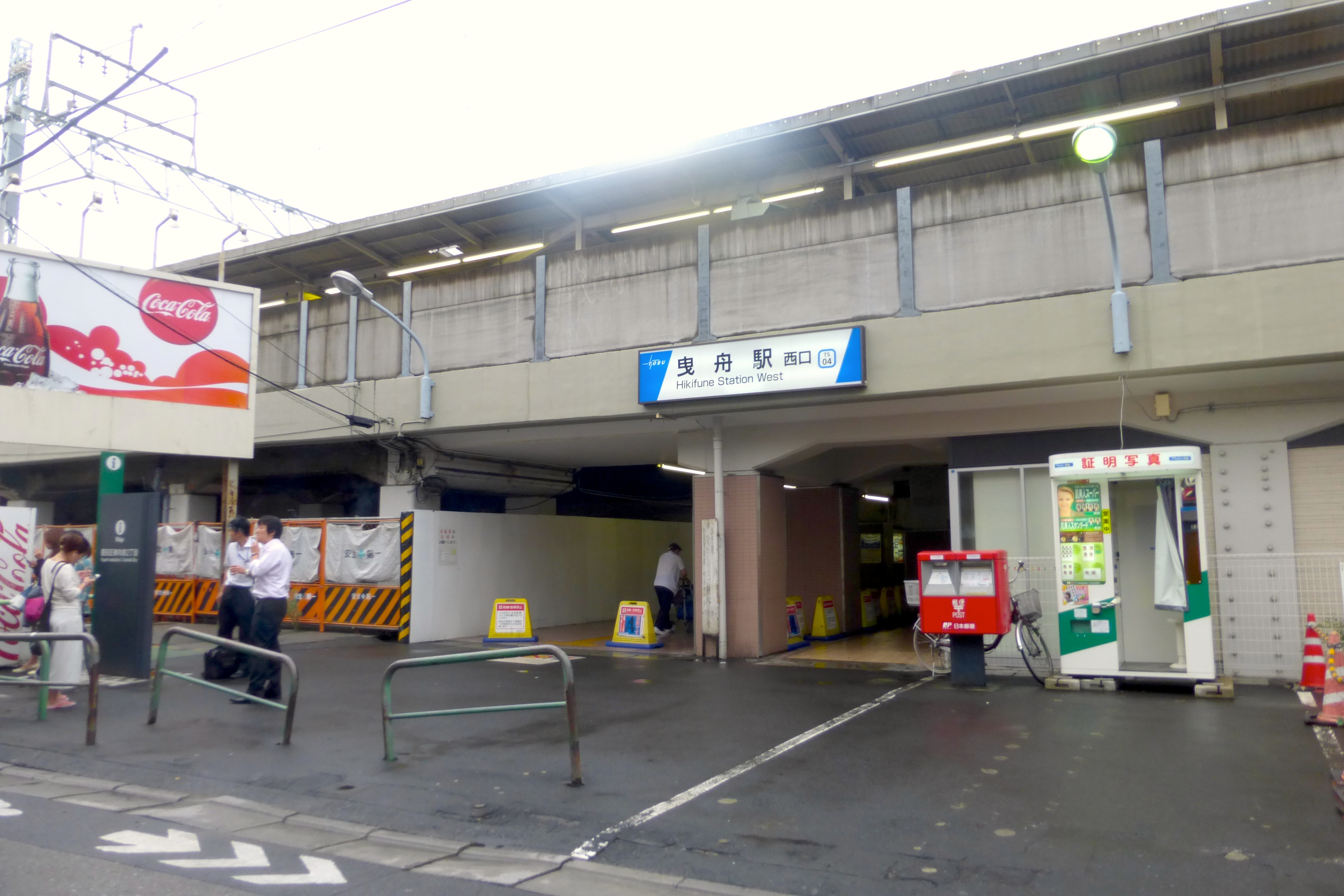
- West entrance, July 2015

General information
- Location: 2-26-6 Higashimukōjima, Sumida, Tokyo （墨田区東向島2-26-6） Japan
- Operator: Tobu Railway
- Lines: Tobu Skytree Line; Tobu Kameido Line

History
- Opened: 1902

Passengers
- FY2024: 14,766 daily boardings

Services
Preceding station	Tobu Railway	Following station
Tokyo Skytree TS02 towards Asakusa	Kegon (limited service)	Kita-Senju TS09 towards Tōbu–Nikkō
Tokyo Skytree TS02 towards Asakusa	Kinu (limited service)	Kita-Senju TS09 towards Kinugawa–Onsen
Tokyo Skytree TS02 towards Asakusa	Ryomo (limited service)	Kita-Senju TS09 towards Kuzū, Akagi or Isesaki
Tokyo Skytree TS02 towards Asakusa	Skytree Liner	Kita-Senju TS09 towards Kasukabe
Tokyo Skytree One-way operation	Urban Park Liner From Asakusa	Kita-Senju TS09 towards Ōmiya or Kashiwa
Oshiage TS03 Terminus	Tobu Skytree Line Express	Kita-Senju TS09 towards Tōbu-Dōbutsu-Kōen
Tokyo Skytree TS02 towards Asakusa	Tobu Skytree Line Section Express	Higashi-Mukōjima TS05 towards Tōbu-Dōbutsu-Kōen
Oshiage TS03 Terminus	Tobu Skytree Line Semi Express	Kita-Senju TS09 towards Tōbu-Dōbutsu-Kōen
Tokyo Skytree TS02 towards Asakusa	Tobu Skytree Line Section Semi Express Local	Higashi-Mukōjima TS05 towards Tōbu-Dōbutsu-Kōen
Omurai TS41 towards Kameido	Kameido Line	Terminus
Track layout
Location

Hikifune Station (曳舟駅, Hikifune-eki) is a railway station in Sumida, Tokyo, Japan, operated by the private railway operator Tobu Railway.

== Lines ==
Hikifune Station is served by the Tobu Skytree Line and Tōbu Kameido Line, and is located 2.4 km from the Tokyo terminus at Asakusa Station. It is also where the Skytree line and trains going to Oshiage Station and the Tokyo Metro Hanzōmon Line split.

== Station layout ==
This station consists of two island platforms serving four tracks for the Tobu Skytree Line. For the Tobu Kameido Line, the station consists of a terminating single side platform serving one track.

Platforms

1	Tobu Skytree Line	for Kita-Senju, Kasukabe, Tōbu-Dōbutsu-Kōen, Kuki, and Minami-Kurihashi (from Asakusa)
2	Tobu Skytree Line	for Kita-Senju, Kasukabe, Tōbu-Dōbutsu-Kōen, Kuki, and Minami-Kurihashi (from Oshiage)
3	Tobu Skytree Line	for Oshiage; Tokyo Metro Hanzōmon Line for Ōtemachi, Nagatacho and Shibuya; Tokyu Den-en-toshi Line for Chūō-Rinkan
4	Tobu Skytree Line	for Tokyo Skytree and Asakusa
5	Tobu Kameido Line	for Kameido

== History ==
The station opened on 1 April 1902. All kinds of limited express have stopped at the station since 6 June 2020.

== Passenger statistics ==
In fiscal 2024, the station was used by an average of 14,766 passengers daily (boarding passengers only).

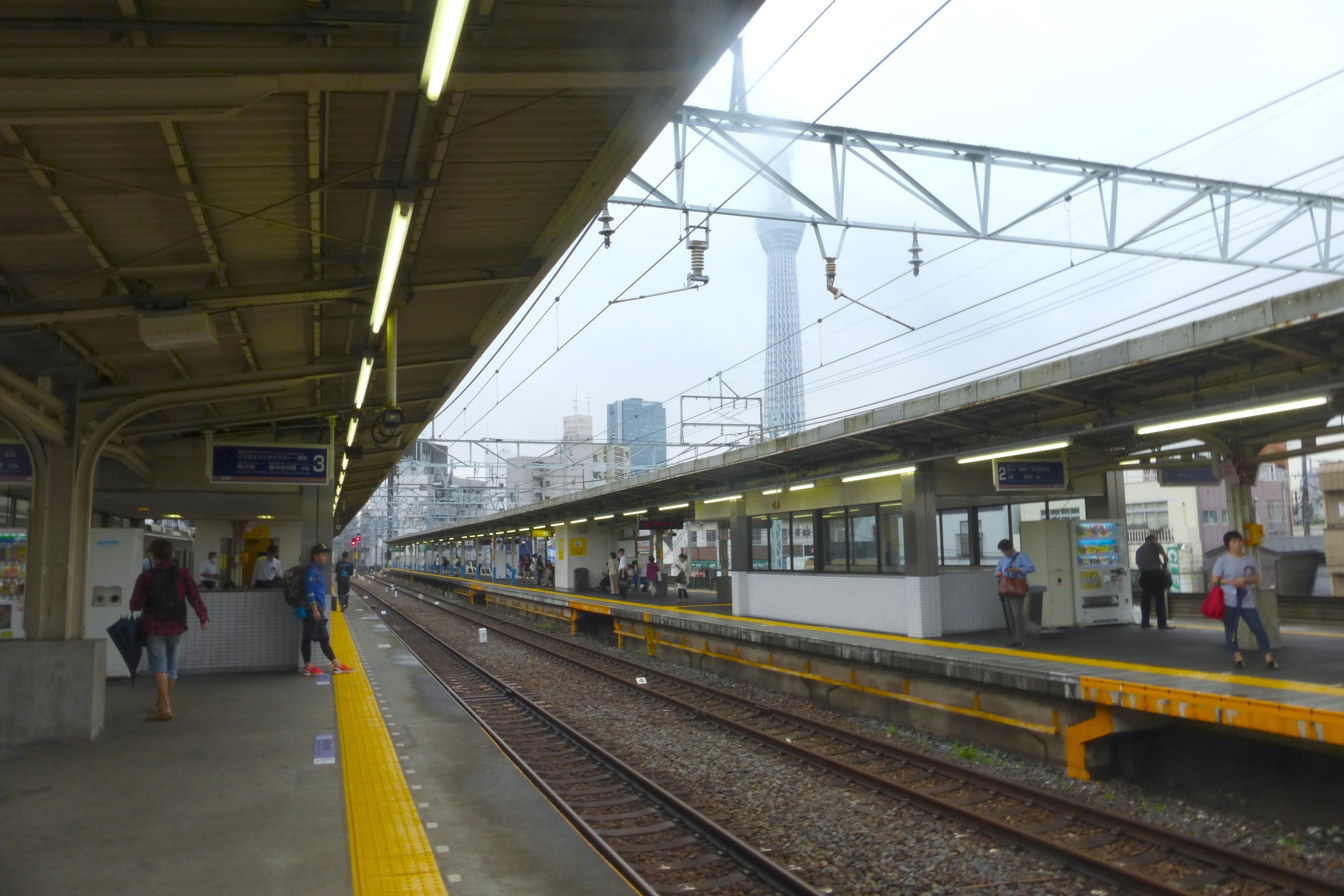
Platforms, with Tokyo Skytree in the distance, 2015

Track diagram

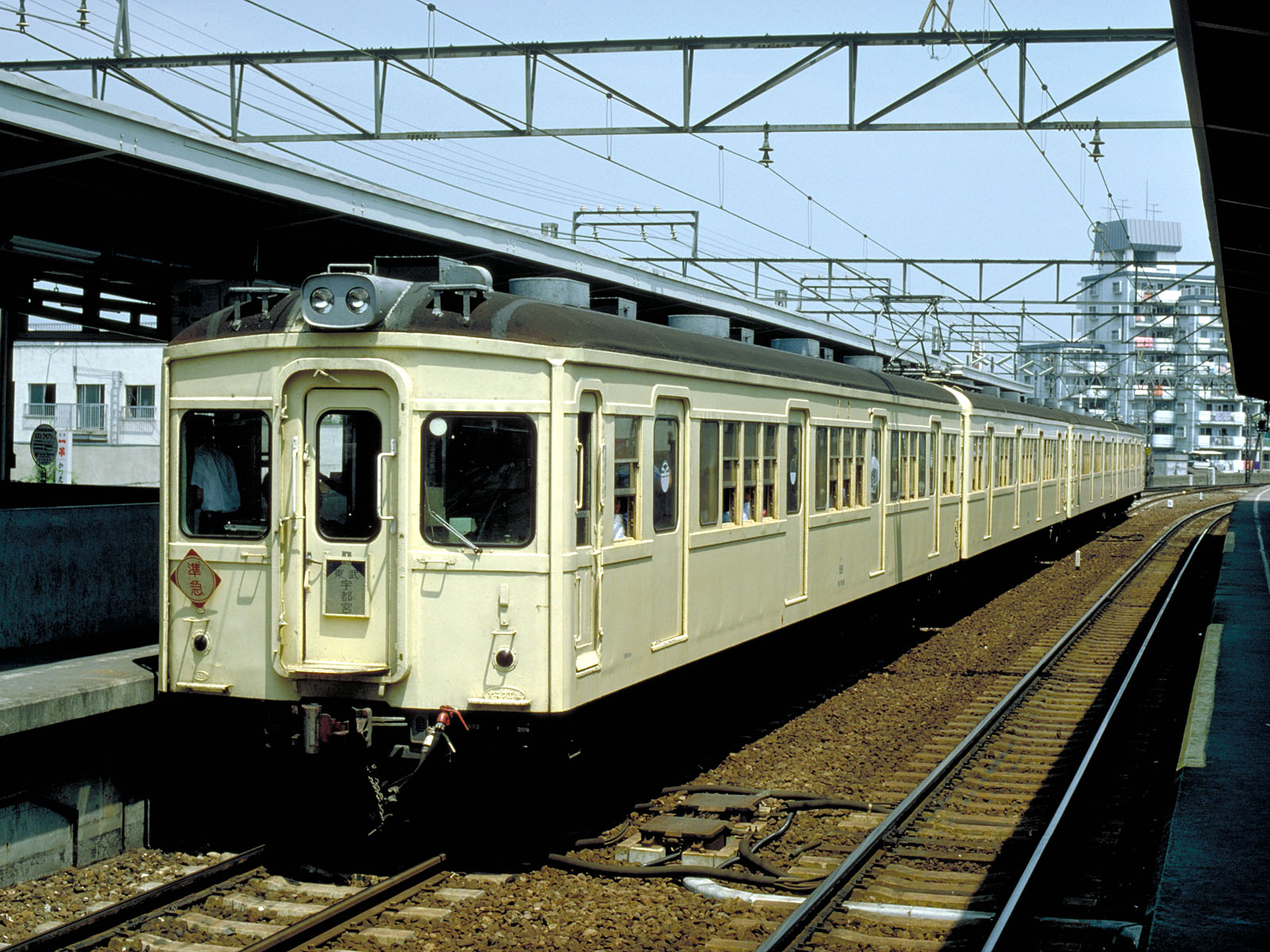
A Tobu 7800 series EMU at Hikifune Station, in the 1980s or earlier
