= Yotsugi Station =

Railway station in Tokyo, Japan

Coordinates: 35.7319°N 139.8351°E

KS48 Yotsugi Station 四ツ木駅
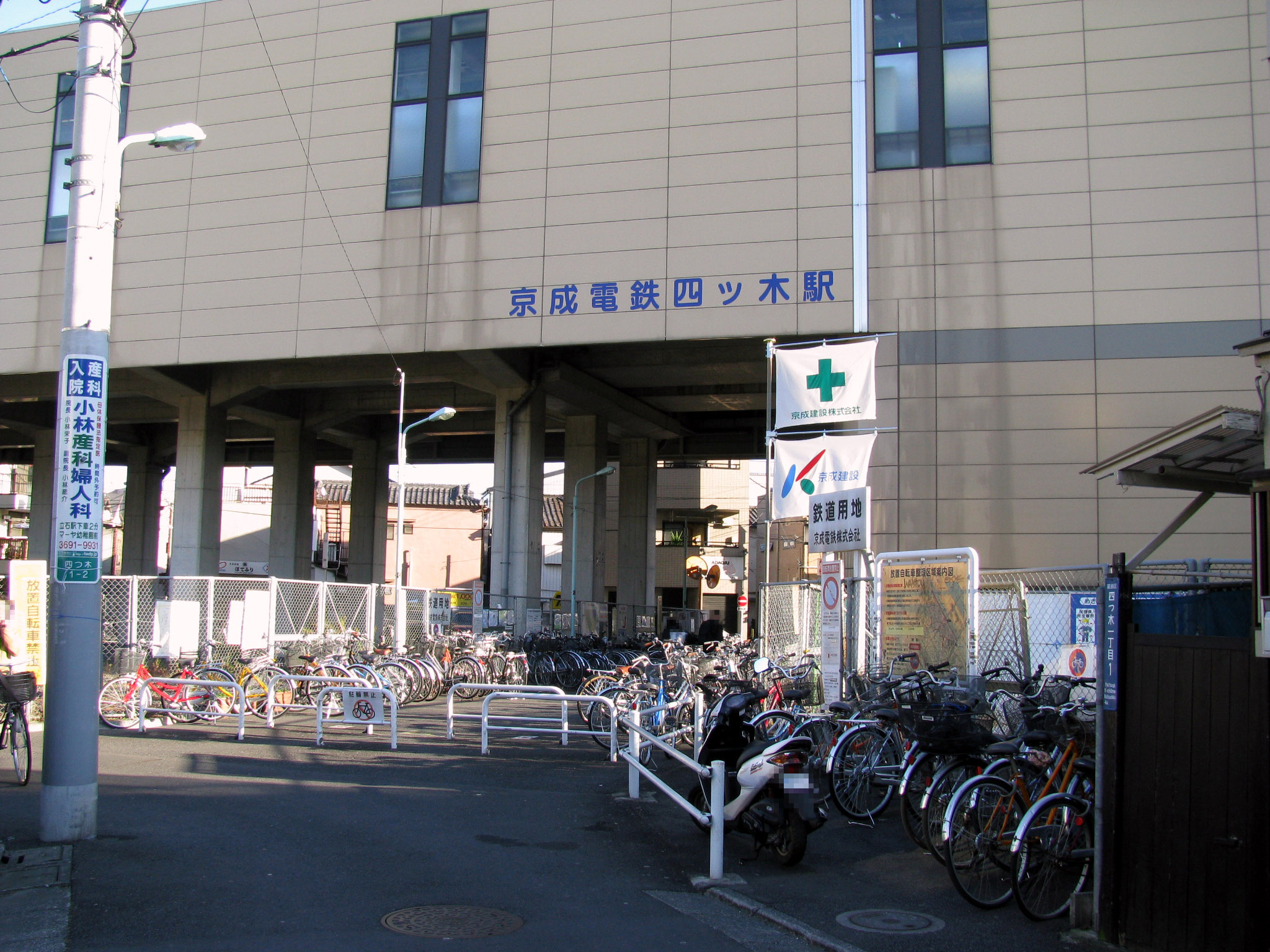
- Yotsugi Station

General information
- Location: Katsushika, Tokyo; Japan
- Operator: Keisei Electric Railway
- Line: Keisei Oshiage Line

History
- Opened: 1912

Services
Preceding station	Keisei	Following station
Yahiro KS47 towards Oshiage	Oshiage Line Local	Keisei Tateishi KS49 towards Aoto
Location

Yotsugi Station (四ツ木駅, Yotsugi-eki) is a railway station on the Keisei Oshiage Line in Katsushika, Tokyo, Japan, operated by the private railway operator Keisei Electric Railway.

== Lines ==
Yotsugi Station is served by the 5.7 km Keisei Oshiage Line, and is located 3.1 km from the starting point of the line at Oshiage.

== Station Layout ==
1	Keisei Oshiage Line	for Oshiage; Toei Asakusa Line for Nihombashi, Shimbashi, and Nishi-magome; Keikyu Line for Shinagawa, Haneda Airport (International Terminal and Domestic Terminal), and Misakiguchi
2	Keisei Oshiage Line	for Aoto, Keisei Funabashi, and Narita Airport (Terminal 2·3 and Terminal 1); Hokusō Line for Imba Nihon-idai

This station consists of two side platforms serving two tracks.

== History ==
The station opened on 3 November 1912.

Yotsugi
