= Shinjuku (disambiguation) =

Shinjuku is one of the 23 special wards of Tokyo, Japan. Shinjuku may also refer to:

== Places in Japan ==
- Shinjuku Station, a train station located in Shinjuku and Shibuya wards in Tokyo, Japan
  - Seibu-Shinjuku Station
  - Shinjuku-sanchōme Station
  - Minami-Shinjuku Station
  - Nishi-Shinjuku Station
  - Shinjuku-gyoemmae Station
- Shinjuku, a region in the city of Tatebayashi, Gunma
- Shinjuku, a region in the ward of Chūō-ku, Chiba
- Shinjuku, a region in the city of Zushi, Kanagawa
- Shinjuku, a town in the city of Numazu, Shizuoka
- Shinjuku, a town in the city of Toyokawa, Aichi

== Entertainment ==
- Shinjuku Incident, a 2009 Hong Kong crime drama film written and directed by Derek Yee and starring Jackie Chan
- VR Zone Shinjuku, a Bandai Namco-owned virtual reality theme park arcade

== See also ==
- Niijuku, a neighborhood in Katsushika Ward written with the same kanji
- Shinju (disambiguation)
- Shinju-kyo
