= Yahiro Station =

Railway station in Tokyo, Japan

Coordinates: 35.7278°N 139.8290°E

KS47 Yahiro Station 八広駅
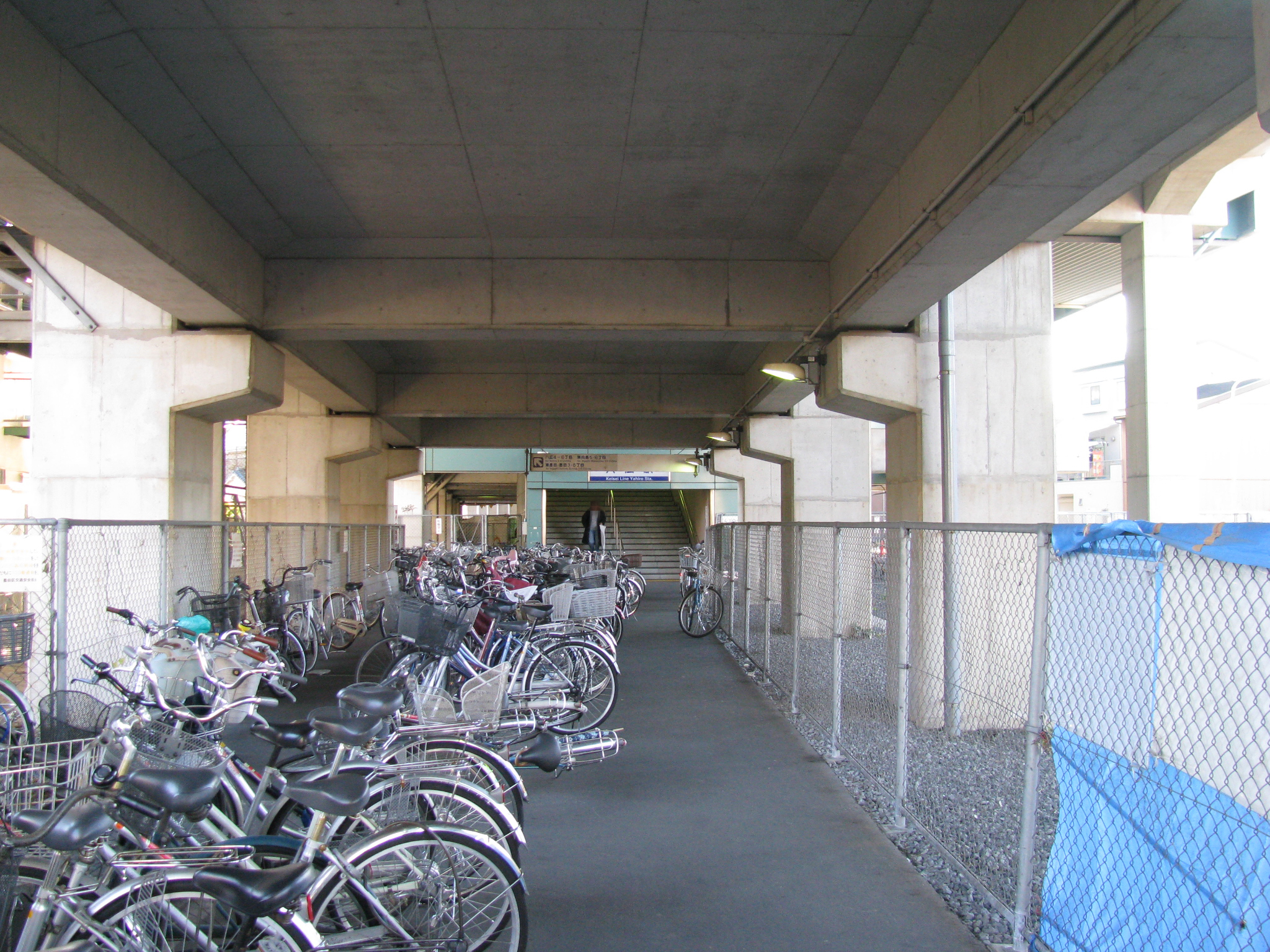

General information
- Location: Sumida, Tokyo; Japan
- Operator: Keisei Electric Railway
- Line: Keisei Oshiage Line

History
- Opened: 1923
- Former names: Arakawa (until 1994)

Services
Preceding station	Keisei	Following station
Keisei Hikifune KS46 towards Oshiage	Oshiage Line Local	Yotsugi KS48 towards Aoto
Location
- Location within Tokyo

Yahiro Station (八広駅, Yahiro-eki) is a railway station on the Keisei Oshiage Line in Sumida, Tokyo, Japan, operated by the private railway operator Keisei Electric Railway.

== Lines ==
Yahiro Station is served by the 5.7 km Keisei Oshiage Line, and is located 2.4 km from the starting point of the line at Oshiage.

== Station layout ==
This station has one island platform and one side platform serving three tracks.

=== Platforms ===
1-2	Keisei Oshiage Line	for Oshiage; Toei Asakusa Line for Nihombashi, Shimbashi, and Nishi-magome; Keikyu Line for Shinagawa, Haneda Airport (International Terminal and Domestic Terminal), and Misakiguchi
2-3	Keisei Oshiage Line	for Aoto, Keisei Funabashi, and Narita Airport (Terminal 2·3 and Terminal 1); Hokusō Line for Imba Nihon-idai

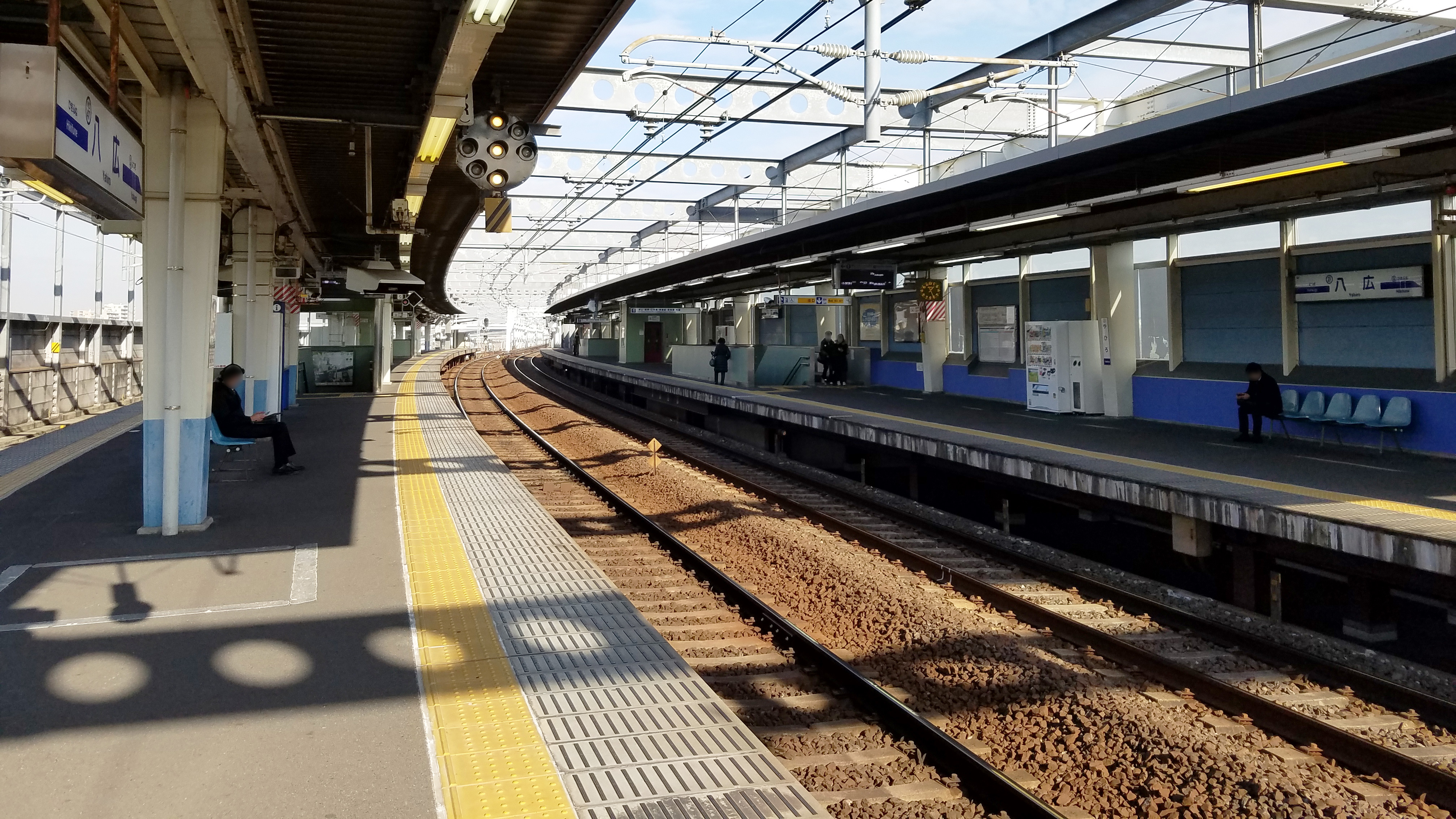
The platforms in December 2016

== History ==
The station opened on 11 July 1923 as Arakawa Station (荒川駅). It was renamed Yahiro Station on 1 April 1994.

Station numbering was introduced to all Keisei Line stations on 17 July 2010; Yahiro was assigned station number KS47.

== See also ==
- List of railway stations in Japan
