= Kumakura =

Kumakura (written: 熊倉) is a Japanese surname. Notable people with the surname include:

- Kazuo Kumakura (熊倉 一雄, 1927–2015), Japanese actor, voice actor and theatre director
- Misaki Kumakura (熊倉 美咲, born 1983), Japanese rower
- Shino Miyaso (née Shino Kumakura), Japanese women's professional shogi player
- Yumi Kumakura (熊倉 由美, born 1978), Japanese volleyball player
