= Keisei Hikifune Station =

Railway station in Tokyo, Japan

KS46 Keisei Hikifune Station 京成曳舟駅
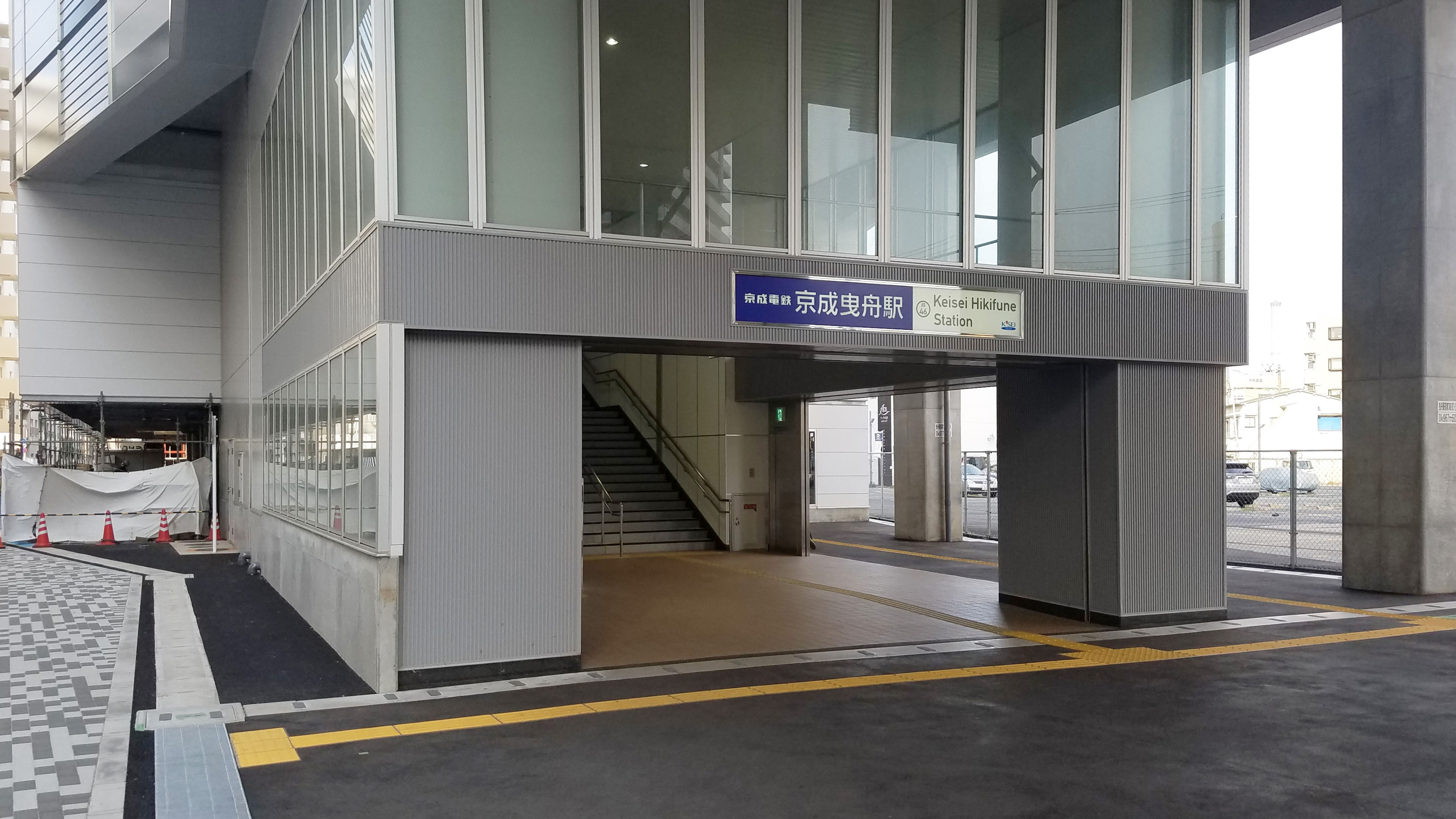
- The west entrance in April 2017

General information
- Location: Sumida-ku, Tokyo; Japan
- Coordinates: 35°43′07″N 139°49′13″E
- Operator: Keisei Electric Railway
- Line: Keisei Oshiage Line
- Platforms: 2 side platforms
- Tracks: 2

History
- Opened: 3 November 1912
- Former names: Hikifune (until 1931)

Services
| Preceding station | Keisei | Following station |
|---|---|---|
| Oshiage KS45 Terminus | Oshiage Line Local | Yahiro KS47 towards Aoto |
Location
- Location within Tokyo Location within Japan

Keisei Hikifune Station (京成曳舟駅, Keisei-Hikifune-eki) is a railway station on the Keisei Oshiage Line in Sumida, Tokyo, Japan, operated by the private railway operator Keisei Electric Railway.

== Lines ==
Keisei Hikifune Station is served by the 5.7 km Keisei Oshiage Line, and is located 1.1 km from the starting point of the line at Oshiage.

== Station layout ==
This station consists of two side platforms serving two tracks.

=== Platforms ===
| 1 | Keisei Oshiage Line | for Oshiage; Toei Asakusa Line for Nihombashi, Shimbashi, and Nishi-magome; Keikyu Line for Shinagawa, Haneda Airport (Int'l Terminal and Domestic Terminal), and Misakiguchi |
| 2 | Keisei Oshiage Line | for Aoto, Keisei Funabashi, and Narita Airport (Terminal 2·3 and Terminal 1); Hokusō Line for Imba Nihon-idai |

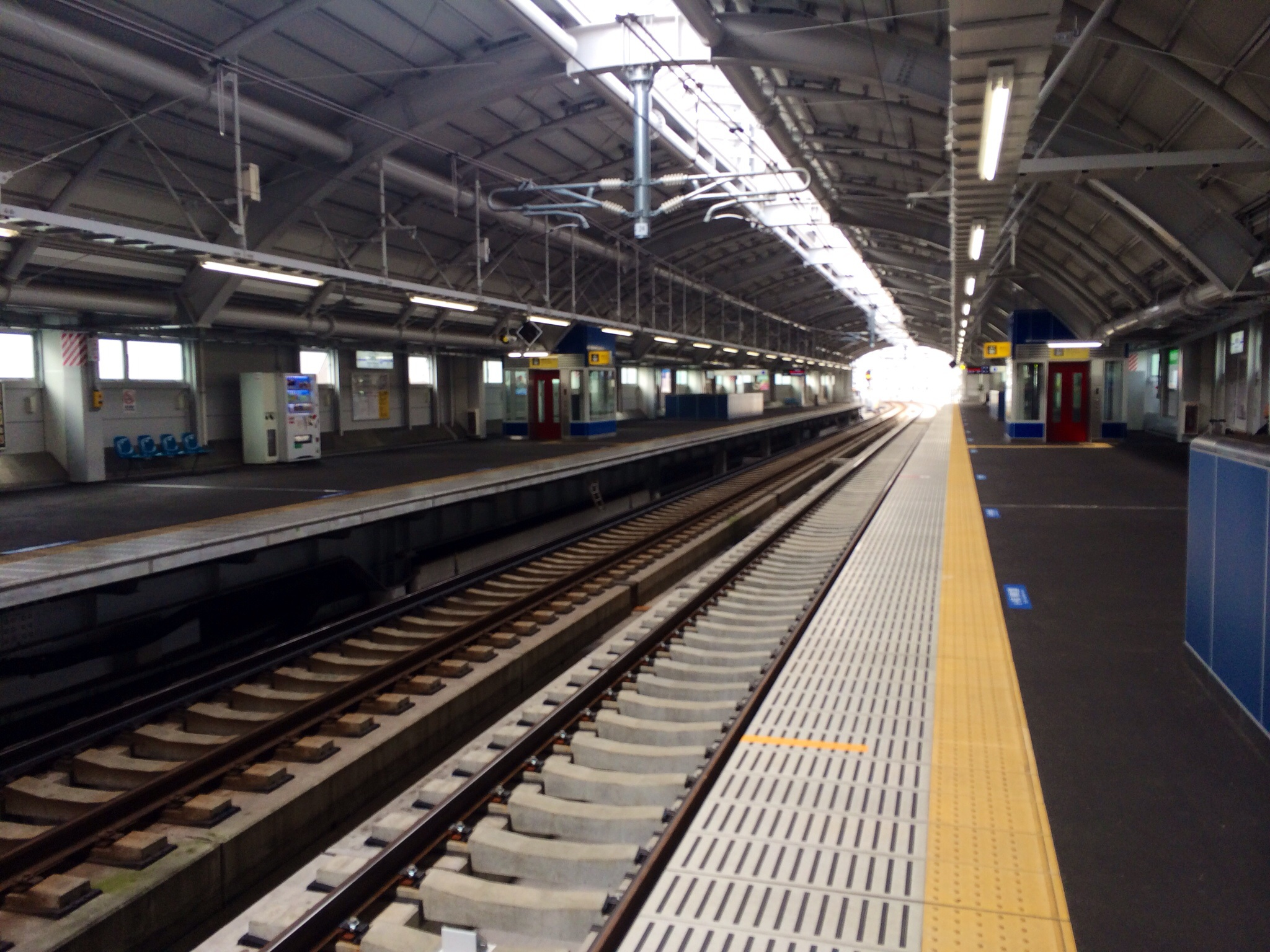
The platforms in September 2015

== History ==
The station opened on 3 November 1912, initially named Hikifune Station (曳舟駅). It was renamed Keisei Hikifune on 18 November 1931.

Station numbering was introduced to all Keisei Line stations on 17 July 2010; Keisei Hikifune was assigned station number KS46.

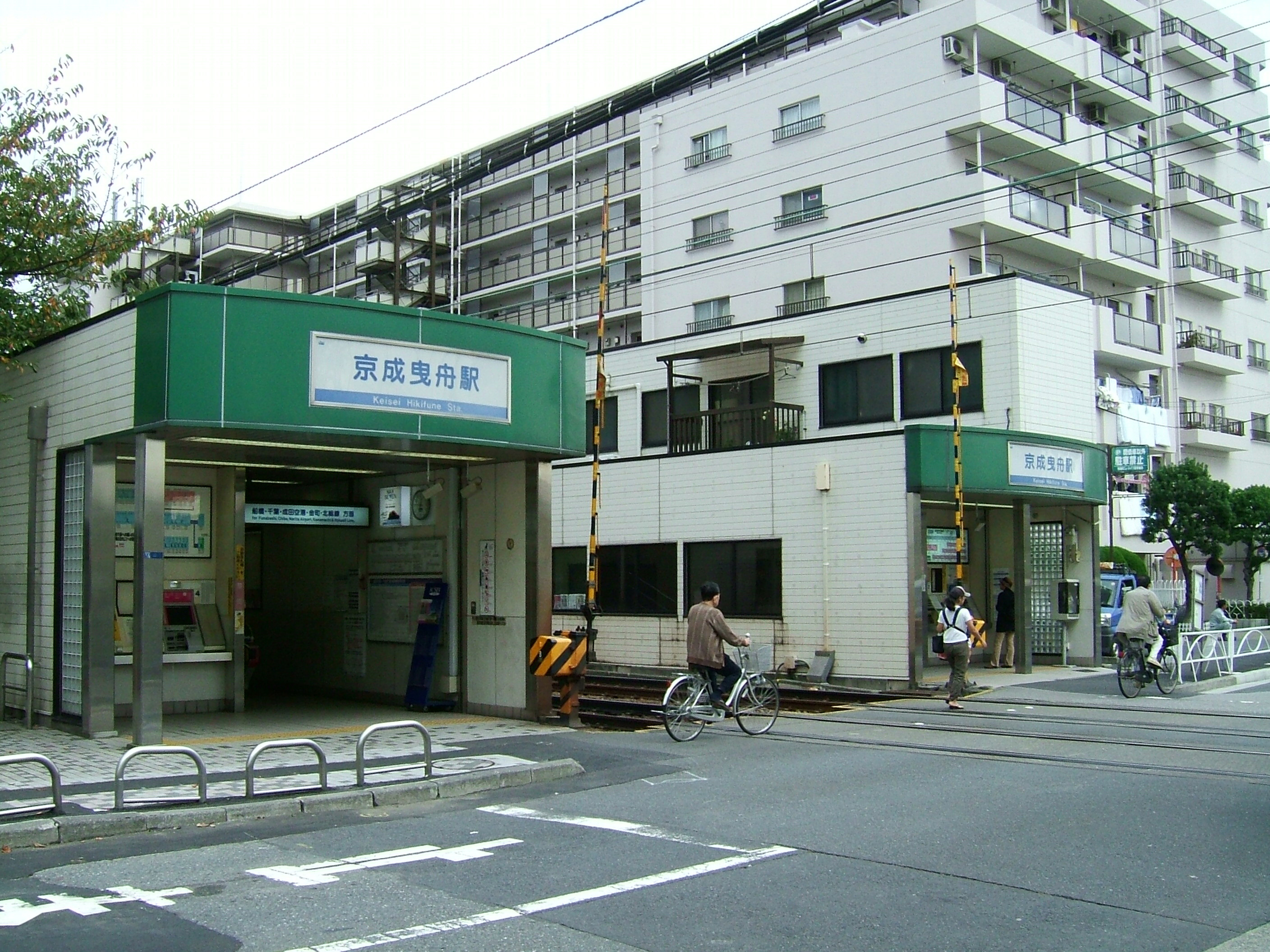
The west entrance in October 2007 before rebuilding

In the 2015 data available from Japan’s Ministry of Land, Infrastructure, Transport and Tourism, Keisei-Hikifune → Oshiage was one of the train segments among Tokyo's most crowded train lines during rush hour.

== Surrounding area ==
- Mukōjima-Hyakkaen Garden

== See also ==
- List of railway stations in Japan
