= Tateishi, Tokyo =

Neighborhood in Katsushika-ku, Tokyo

Coordinates: 35.738360°N 139.848862°E

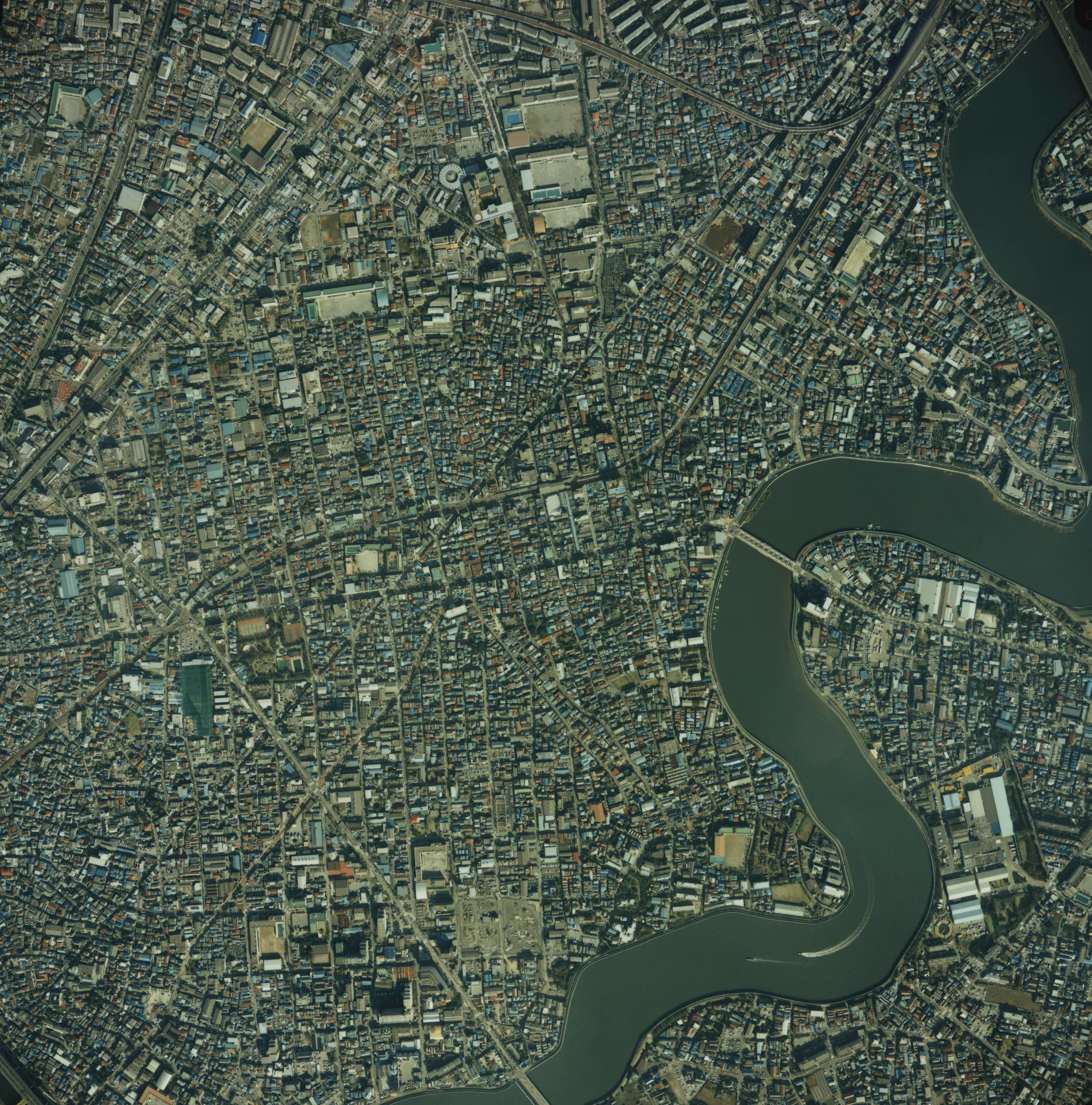
Tateishi

Tateishi (立石) is a neighborhood in Katsushika, Tokyo, Japan. The name derives from a tiny stone monument called Tateishi-sama (立石様), located at 8-37 Tateishi. With its retro-chic shopping streets and small, back-street workshops and factories, the area retains an atmosphere associated with Tokyo's earthy Shitamachi, literally "low-town" or "under-town", but never "downtown", neighborhoods. Katsushika Ward Office, is located at 5-13-1 Tateishi.

== Geography ==
Tateishi is situated on the west bank of the Nakagawa, a river, about 3 km south of the Kameari area known to many through the manga Kochira Katsushika-ku Kameari Kōen-mae Hashutsujo.

The Higashi-Tateishi ("east Tateishi") neighborhood lies to the south of Tateishi. Tateishi Nakamise (立石仲見世), an old-fashioned shopping street near the railway station, was started soon after World War II ended.

Until around 1980, Tateishi was home to numerous small, family-owned factories, though many of these have since closed and small apartment houses now occupy many of their former sites. The neighborhood's chief industries include dyeing works and doll manufacturing.

== Transportation ==
Tateishi is served by the Keisei Electric Railway through its Keisei Tateishi Station. Most trains stopping at Tateishi also serve Asakusa, about 12 minutes away. Narita International Airport is also readily accessible from Tateishi by changing to a limited express train at Aoto, the next station down the line in the Narita direction.

== Major businesses ==
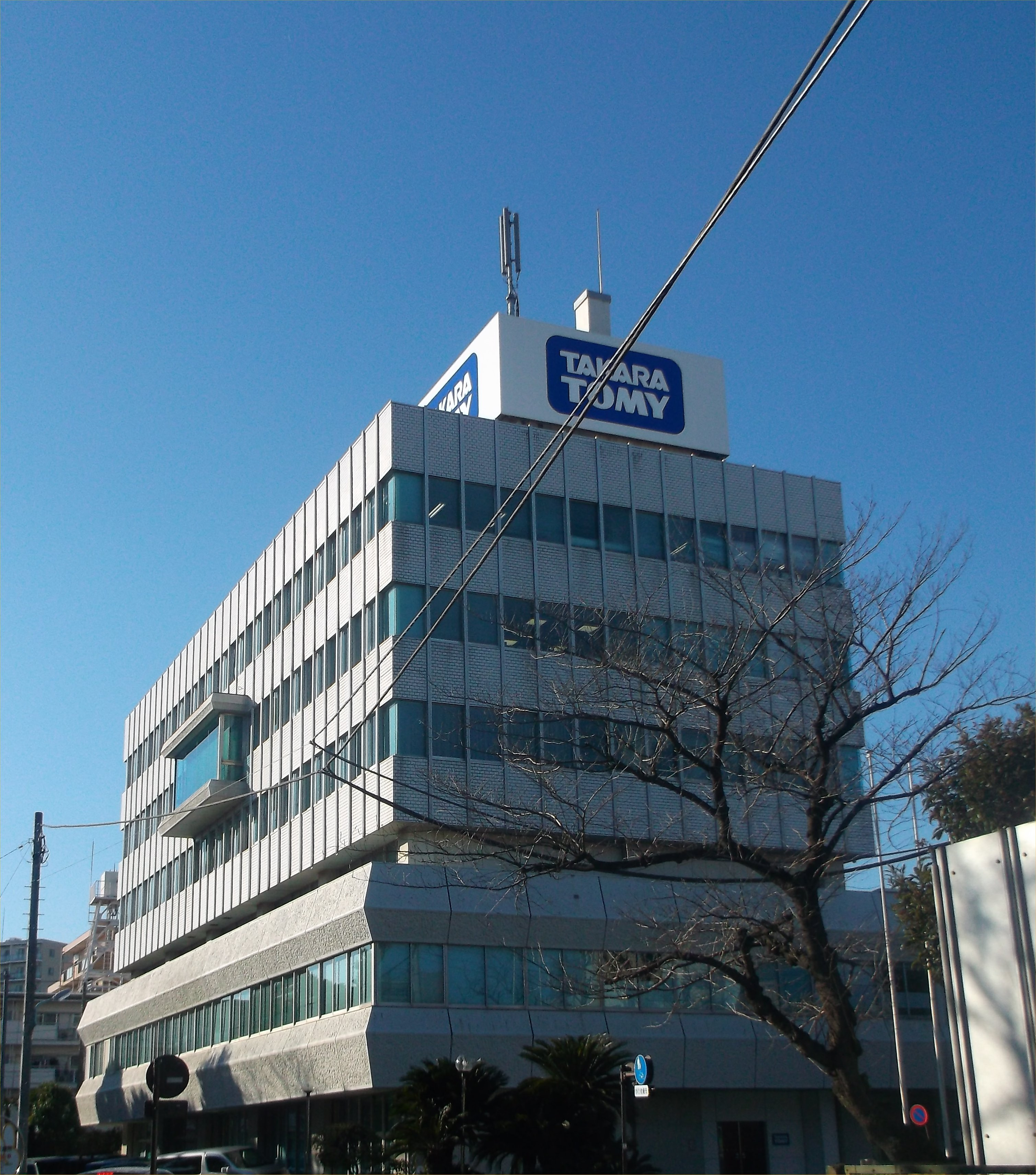
Tomy headquarters

Toy, merchandising, and entertaining giant Tomy is headquartered in Tateishi.

== Tateishi-sama ==
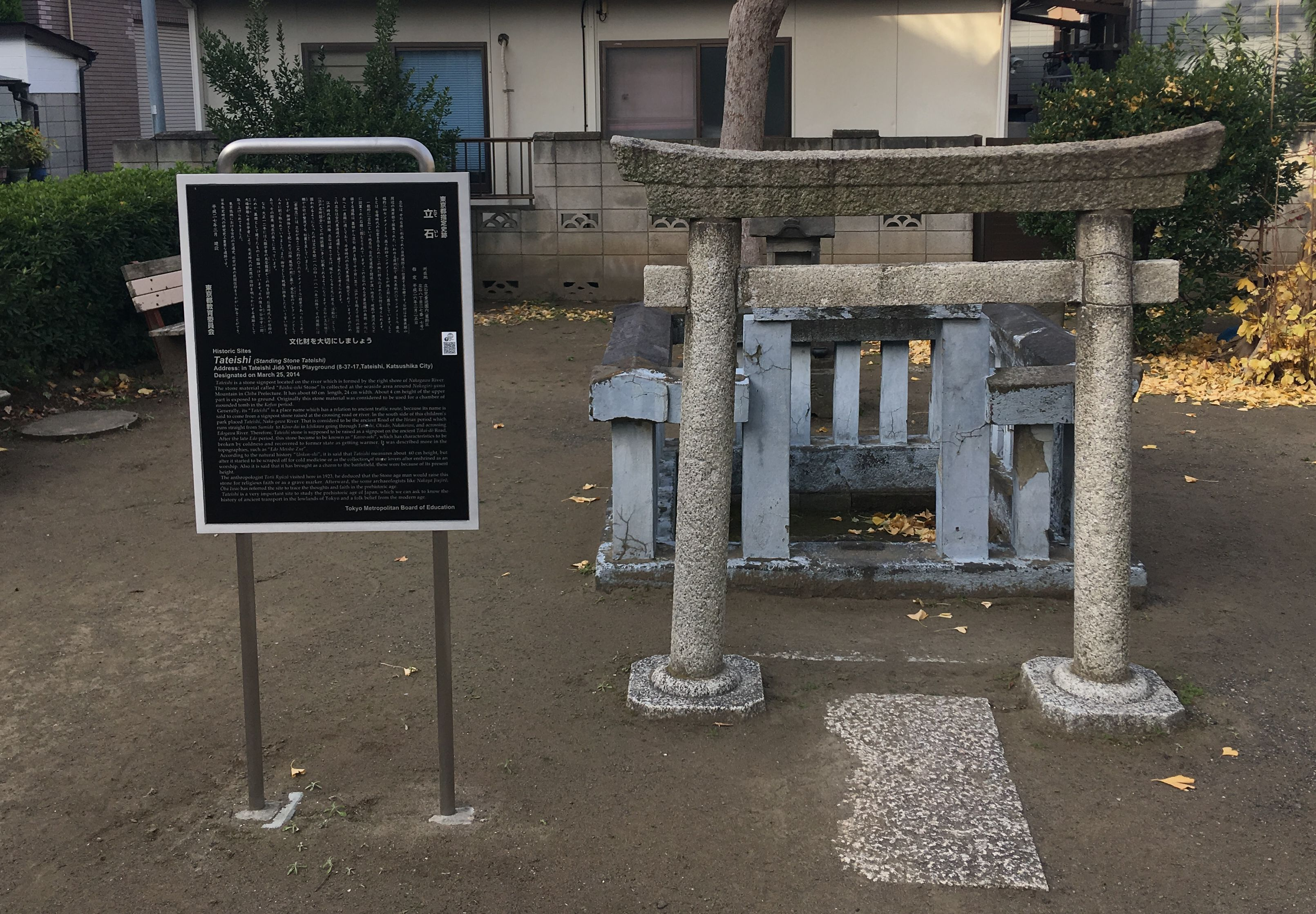
Tateishi-sama, inside the stone fence behind the torii

Tateishi ("standing stone") derives its name from a standing stone addressed by locals as Tateishi-sama, sama being a suffix indicating respect. The stone has been at its present location for at least 600 years and is thought to have been carried and erected here given that the area is on alluvial soil. Locals began to worship the stone as an embodiment of the deity Inari during the Edo period (ca. 1600–1868), hence the sama in the name. The stone is reputed to have once had a height of 8-24 inches (approximately 20 to 60 cm), but today it stands only 1 inch above ground level due to the effects of floods, subsidence, and breakage by locals who wanted to use a piece of the stone as a talisman against disease or getting shot in battle.

== Education ==
Katsushika Ward Board of Education operates public elementary and junior high schools.

Tateishi 1-chome is zoned to Honden Elementary School (本田小学校). 2-4-chome and part of 5-chome are zoned to Umeda Elementary School (梅田小学校). 6-7-chome and the rest of 5-chome are zoned to Seiwa Elementary School (清和小学校). 8-chome is zoned to Katsushika Elementary School (葛飾小学校).

Tateishi 3-4 and 6-8-chome, as well as part of 5-chome, are zoned to Tateishi Junior High School (立石中学校). 2-chome and the rest of 5-chome are zoned to Daido Junior High School (大道中学校). 1-chome is zoned to Honden Junior High School (本田中学校).
