= Kanamachi (disambiguation) =

Kanamachi is a traditional game popular in Bangladesh and India.

Kanamachi may also refer to:

- Kanamachi (film), a 2013 Indian Bengali-language film by Raj Chakraborty
- Kanamachi (TV series), an Indian Bengali-language television series
- Kanamachi, Tokyo, district of Katsushika, Tokyo, Japan
- Kanamachi Station, railway station in Katsushika, Tokyo, Japan
