= Keisei Oshiage Line =

Railway line in Tokyo, Japan

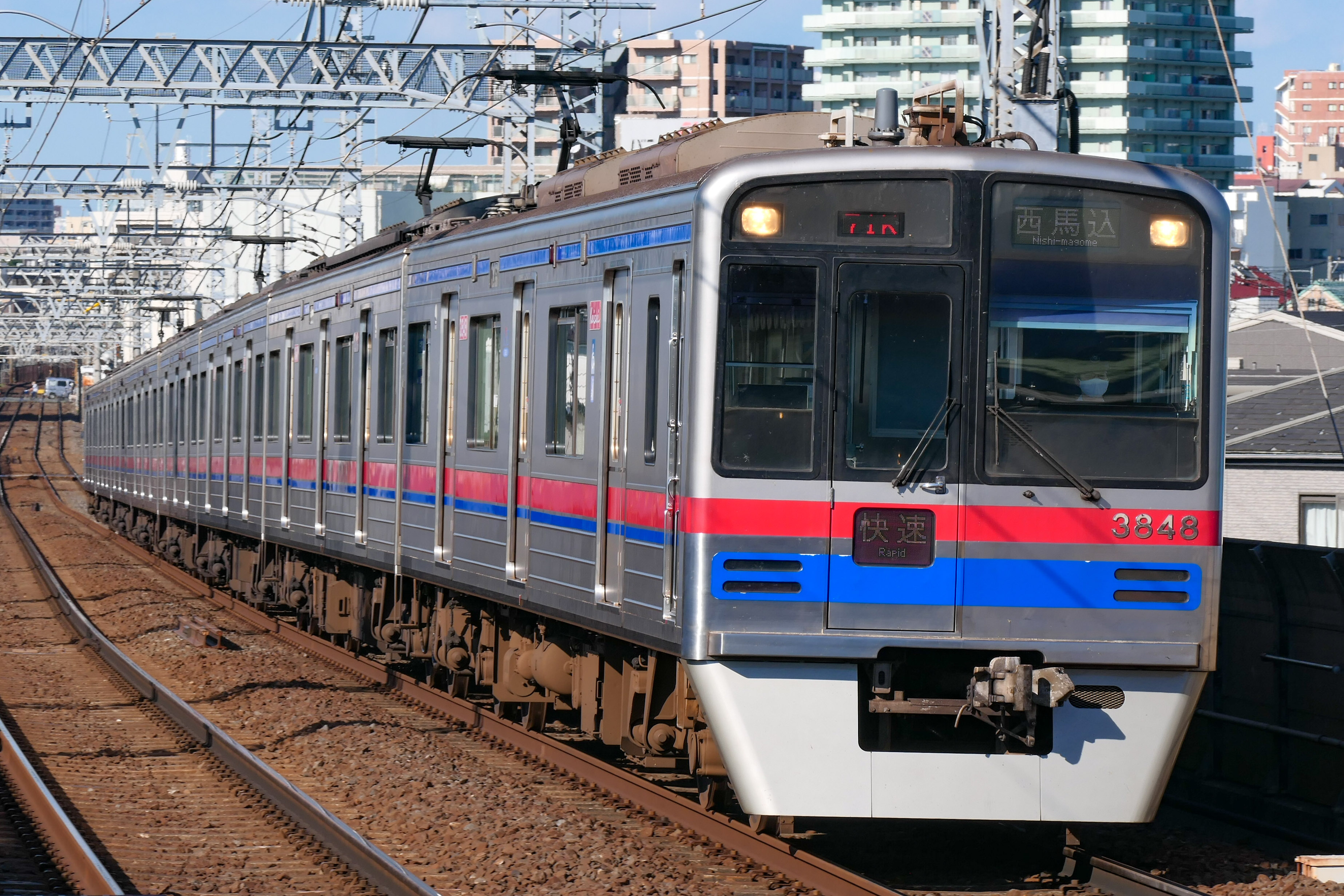
- A Keisei 3700 series EMU on the Oshiage Line on a Rapid service

Overview
- Native name: 京成押上線
- Owner: Keisei
- Locale: Tokyo
- Termini: Oshiage; Aoto
- Stations: 6

Service
- Type: Commuter rail

History
- Opened: November 3, 1912; 113 years ago

Technical
- Line length: 5.7 km (3.5 mi)
- Number of tracks: Double-track
- Track gauge: 1,435 mm (4 ft 8 1/2 in) standard gauge
- Minimum radius: 260 m (850 ft)
- Electrification: 1,500 V DC (Overhead line)
- Operating speed: 105 km/h (65 mph)
- Signalling: Automatic closed block
- Train protection system: C-ATS
- Maximum incline: 3.5%

The Keisei Oshiage Line (京成押上線, Keisei-Oshiage-sen) is a railway line in Tokyo, Japan, operated by the private railway company Keisei Electric Railway. It connects Oshiage Station in Sumida and Aoto Station in Katsushika.

The Oshiage Line passes through areas typical of Tokyo's shitamachi ("downtown") working-class sections known for their distinctively earthy atmosphere.

== Basic data ==
- Gauge: 1,435 mm (4 ft 8 1/2 in)
- Track: double
- Block system: Automatic
- ATC/ATS: C-ATS

== Service patterns ==
The following types of service operate on the line.

Access Express (アクセス特急, Akusesu Tokkyū)
Through service on the Keisei Narita Sky Access Line.
Through services to Toei Asakusa Line and Keikyu Line, Airport Limited Express for Haneda Airport.
Limited Express (快速特急, Kaisoku Tokkyū)
Through services to Toei Asakusa Line and Keikyu Line, Airport Limited Express on the Asakusa Line, Limited Express (Kaitoku) on the Keikyu Line for Haneda Airport.
Limited Express (特急, Tokkyū)
Commuter Express (通勤特急, Tsūkin Tokkyū)
Rapid (快速, Kaisoku)
Through service on the Keisei Main Line.
Local (普通, Futsū)
Trains stop at all stations along the Oshiage Line.
- Through services to Toei Asakusa Line and Keikyu Main Line, Limited Express (Kaitoku) for Misakiguchi.
- Through services to Hokuso Line.

== Stations ==
No.	Station	Distance in km (mi)		Access Express	Ltd. Express (green)	Ltd. Express (red)	Commuter Express	Rapid	Transfers	Location
No.	Station	Between stations	Total	Access Express	Ltd. Express (green)	Ltd. Express (red)	Commuter Express	Rapid	Transfers	Location
↑ Through-running to/from ↑ Nishi-Magome via the Toei Asakusa Line; Yokohama via the Toei Asakusa and Keikyū Main lines and Misakiguchi via the Keikyū Kurihama Line; Haneda Airport via the Toei Asakusa, Keikyū Main and Keikyū Airport lines
KS45	Oshiage 押上	—N/a	0 (0)	●	●	●	●	●	Toei Asakusa Line (A-20, through service); Tobu Skytree Line (TS-03); Tokyo Metro Hanzomon Line (Z-14)	Sumida
KS46	Keisei Hikifune 京成曳舟	1.1 (0.68)	1.1 (0.68)	|	|	|	|	|		Sumida
KS47	Yahiro 八広	1.3 (0.81)	2.4 (1.5)	|	|	|	|	|		Sumida
KS48	Yotsugi 四ツ木	0.7 (0.43)	3.1 (1.9)	|	|	|	|	|		Katsushika
KS49	Keisei Tateishi 京成立石	1.5 (0.93)	4.6 (2.9)	|	|	|	|	|		Katsushika
KS09	Aoto 青砥	1.1 (0.68)	5.7 (3.5)	●	●	●	●	●	Keisei Main Line (through service)	Katsushika
↓ Through-running to/from ↓ Narita Airport via the Main Line; Narita Airport via the Main and Narita Sky Access lines Imba Nihon-idai via the Main and Hokusō lines Shibayama-Chiyoda via the Main, Higashi-Narita, and Shibayama Railway lines

== History ==
This line constituted part of the original Keisei Main Line, opened in 1914 as a dual track 1,372 mm gauge electrified line, but once the section from Ueno and Nippori to Aoto came into service in 1932, this line became a short branch and was renamed the "Oshiage Line".

The line was regauged to 1,435 mm in 1959 in preparation for the introduction of through services upon the opening of Tokyo Metropolitan Bureau of Transport (Toei) Line 1 (present Toei Asakusa Line) on 4 December 1960, when the line returned to its original role in the Keisei network, to provide trains from its main line to downtown Tokyo via the Toei line. It also provides connections at Oshiage to the Tobu Skytree Line and the Tokyo Metro Hanzōmon Line. The line is now a de facto main line of Keisei.

=== Former connecting lines ===
- Mukojima Station (since closed): The Keisei company was seeking a line to Tokyo, and encouraged the Ōji Electric Railway to construct a 1.4 km 1,372 mm gauge line to this station as part of a campaign for government approval for a Tokyo line, the line opening in 1928. However, once approval to build to Ueno was received, the Tokyo line proposal lapsed and the line closed in 1936. Mukojima Station closed in 1947.
