= Keisei Tateishi Station =

Railway station in Tokyo, Japan

KS49 Keisei Tateishi Station 京成立石駅
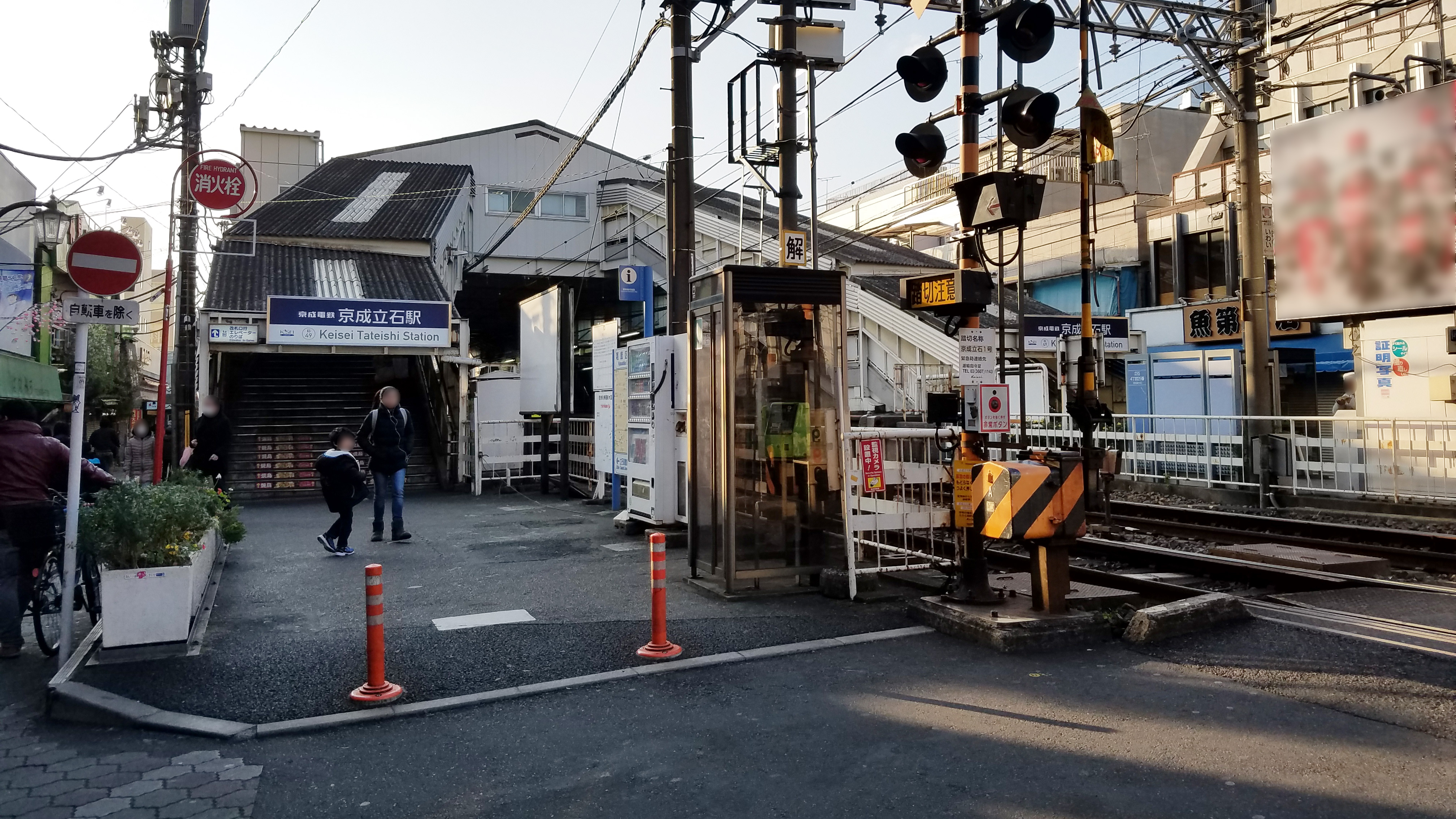
- The entrance on the south side in January 2017

General information
- Location: Katsushika-ku, Tokyo; Japan
- Coordinates: 35.7383°N 139.8486°E
- Operator: Keisei Electric Railway
- Line: Keisei Oshiage Line
- Distance: 4.6 km from Oshiage
- Platforms: 2 side platforms
- Tracks: 2

Other information
- Station code: KS49

History
- Opened: 3 November 1912

Services
Preceding station	Keisei	Following station
Yotsugi KS48 towards Oshiage	Oshiage Line Local	Aoto KS09 Terminus
Location
- Location within Tokyo

Keisei Tateishi Station (京成立石駅, Keisei-Tateishi-eki) is a railway station on the Keisei Oshiage Line in Katsushika, Tokyo, Japan, operated by the private railway operator Keisei Electric Railway.

== Lines ==
Keisei Tateishi Station is served by the 5.7 km Keisei Oshiage Line, and is located 4.6 km from the starting point of the line at Oshiage.

== Station layout ==
The station has two side platforms serving two tracks.

=== Platforms ===
1	Keisei Oshiage Line	for Oshiage; Toei Asakusa Line for Nihombashi, Shimbashi, and Nishi-magome; Keikyu Line for Shinagawa, Haneda Airport (International Terminal and Domestic Terminal), and Misakiguchi
2	Keisei Oshiage Line	for Aoto, Keisei Funabashi, and Narita Airport (Terminal 2·3 and Terminal 1); Hokusō Line for Imba Nihon-idai

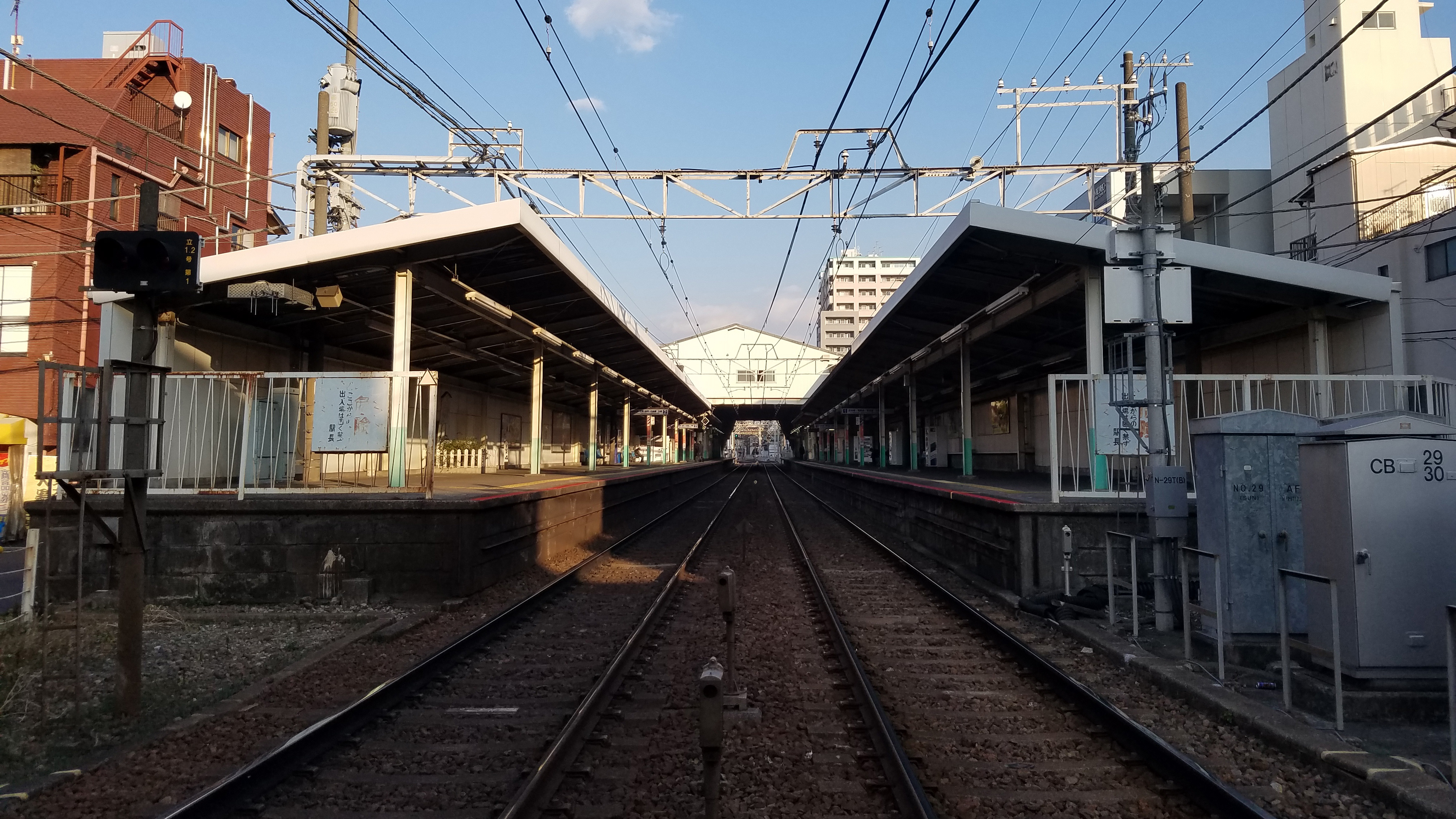
The platforms viewed from the level crossing on the west side in January 2017

== History ==
Keisei Tateishi station opened on 3 November 1912.

Station numbering was introduced to all Keisei Line stations on 17 July 2010; Keisei Tateishi was assigned station number KS49.

== See also ==
- List of railway stations in Japan

== Surrounding area ==
- Katsushika Ward Office
