= Kasai Shrine =

Coordinates: 35°46′05″N 139°52′54″E

Kasai Shrine 葛西神社
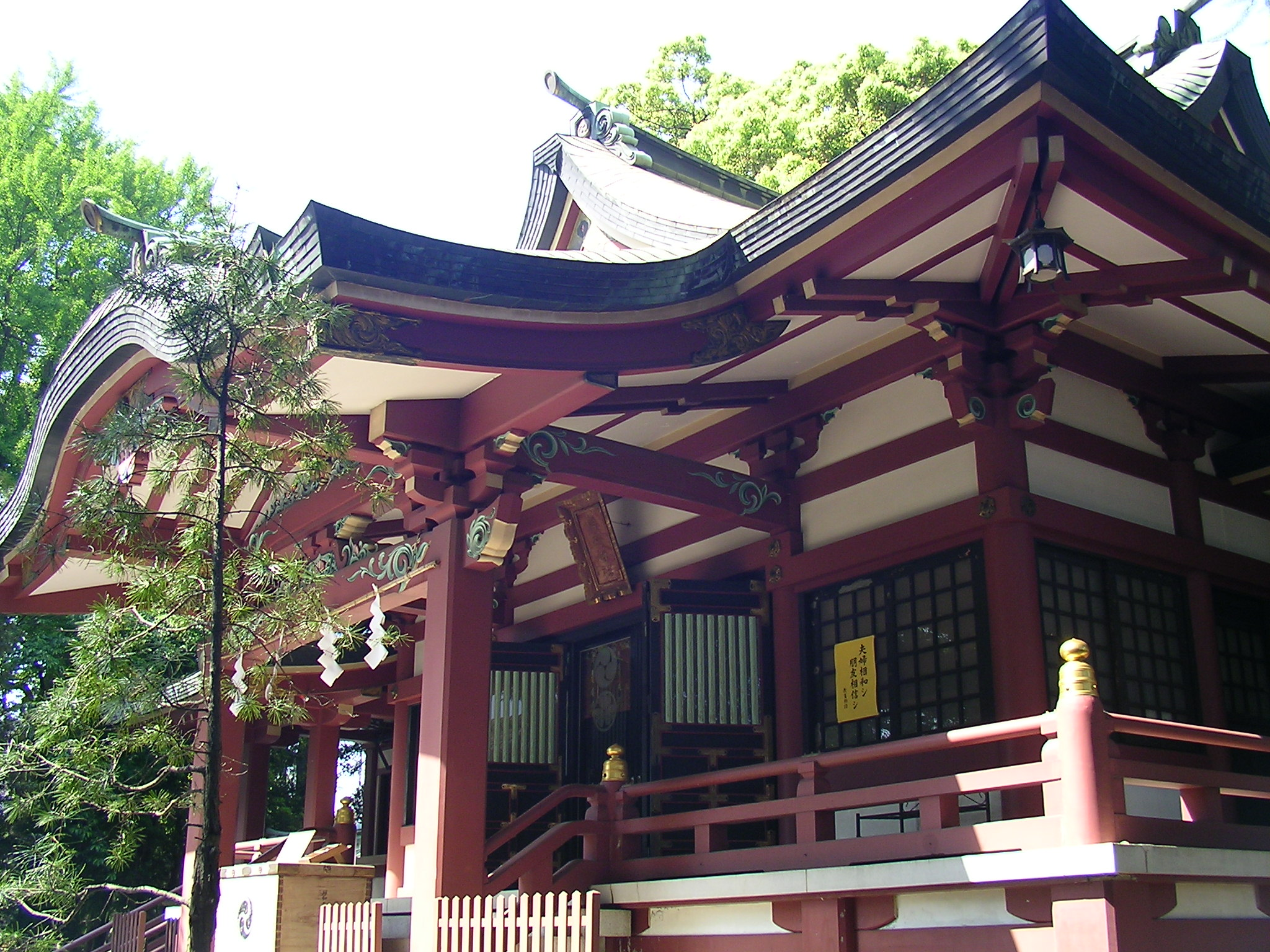
- Shaden

Religion
- Affiliation: Shinto
- Deity: Futsunushi no kami Yamatotakeru no mikoto Tokugawaieyasu no mikoto
- Type: Katori Shrine

Location
- Location: 6-10-5, higashikanamachi Katsushika-ku; Tokyo 125-0041
- Interactive map of Kasai Shrine 葛西神社

Architecture
- Established: 1185

Website
- homepage3.nifty.com/kasaijinja/

Kasai Shrine (葛西神社) was the head shrine of eleven towns in the region and is classified historically as a district shrine (郷社). It is located in Higashi Kanamachi, Katsushika ward, Tokyo.

== History ==
Kasai shrine was founded in 1185 at the end of the Heian period. To protect the regional area, the same deity as the Katori jingu shrine, named Futsunushi no kami, was enshrined in Kasai shrine. Originally, Kasai shrine was called Katori-gu, but later on it happened to be called Kasai shrine. After World War II Kasai shrine became the religious corporation.

== Enshrined deities ==
=== Futsunushi no kami ===
Futsunushi no kami is a symbol of the sword, which is sent to defeat evil. Because of that legend, nowadays people worship him as a symbol of achieving goals, winning, and self studying.

=== Yamatotakeru no mikoto ===
Yamatotakeru no mikoto was the son of Emperor Keiko. In the Nihonshoki, there is an old legend that says when he died, his spirit turned into a bird and flew away. He is famous for many other old legends.

=== Tokugawa ieyasu no mikoto ===
At the beginning of the Edo period, Tokugawa Ieyasu came to Kasai shrine to see the old regional puppet theater. He was astonished by the performance, so in 1591 he gave Kasai shrine a red seal as a certification to make people try harder. Because of this episode, Tokugawa Ieyasu is also enshrined as one of the deities in Kasai shrine. People nowadays worship him as a symbol of success in business, achieving goals.

== Matsuribayashi ==
It is said that Kasai shrine is the origin of Matsuribayashi. It is an old regional Japanese band that started in Edo Period in the eastern part of Edo. During the Kyouhou Period, one of the Shinto priests of Kasai shrine, named Nose Tamaki, taught classical verses with tunes to young people. That was the very start of Matsuribayashi. Later, it happened to be called Kasaibayashi and became very popular in the Kantō region and other areas.

After World War II, the Kasaibayashi Preservation Association was founded by some volunteers and it became an Intangible Cultural Treasure. Kasaibayashi is still played by people and once a month they practice at Kasai shrine.

Twice a year, at the time of Tori no ichi (in November) and Reitaisai (in September), they play the music in front of people at the old building (Kaguraden) in Kasai shrine.

== Tori no ichi ==
Tori no Ichi (酉の市, lit. "Market of the Rooster"); there is a big festival in November (as a precursor event for Shōgatsu (Japanese New Year)), called "Tori no Ichi"; the word tori means "bird" (usually specifying a rooster), and the bird is a symbol of one of the Japanese deities, named Yamatotakeru-no-Mikoto. Nowadays people come to the festival to buy "Kumade", a Engimono talisman in the shape of a small pitchfork, wishing to have some fortune.

A karaoke tournament has been held at this festival since before World War II, and many people have participated and wait to be judged by the bell which was first used in the NHK singing tournament program.

== Antique market ==
Every first Saturday from 8:00 a.m. until about 5:00 p.m., there is an antique market in the Kasai shrine. This market is organized by Antique Market Committee and it is possible to see many different kinds of shops at the market with old pictures, kimono, dishes, old clocks, etc.

== Cultural properties ==
- Wooden drawings of Akouroushi
- Letters from Asano Nagayoshi to Kasai shrine who was working for Toyotomi Hideyoshi.
- Statue Shouki of stone
- Big ginkgo tree
- "Mikoshi" of Kasai shrine

== Gallery ==
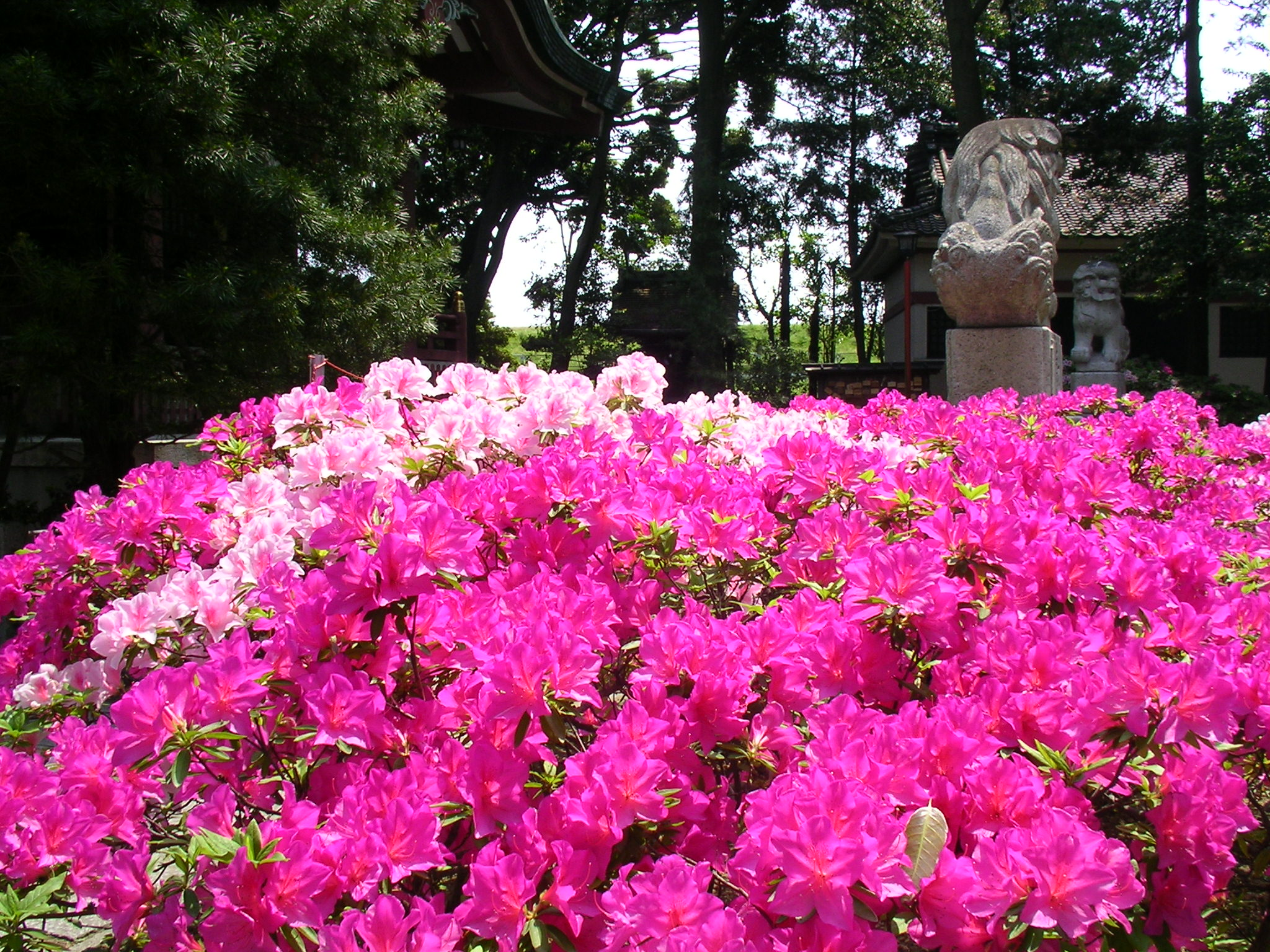
Kasai shrine flowers

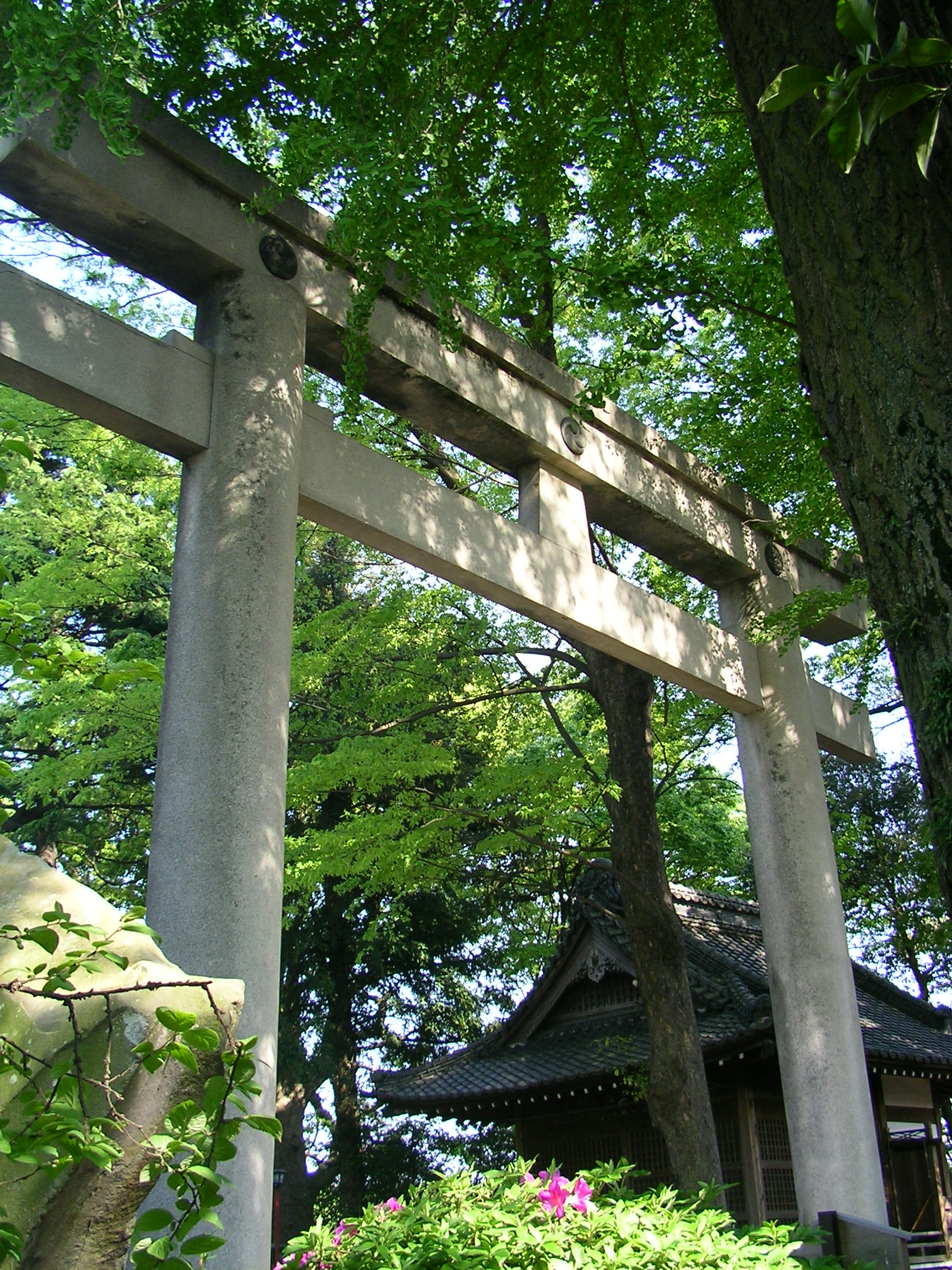
Kasai shrine Torii

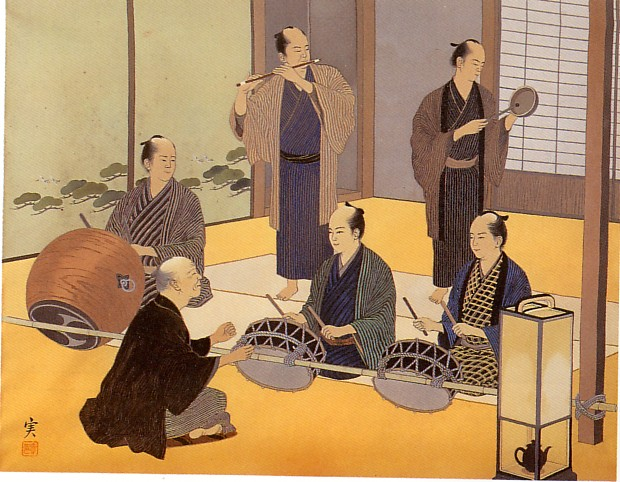
Kasai bayashi

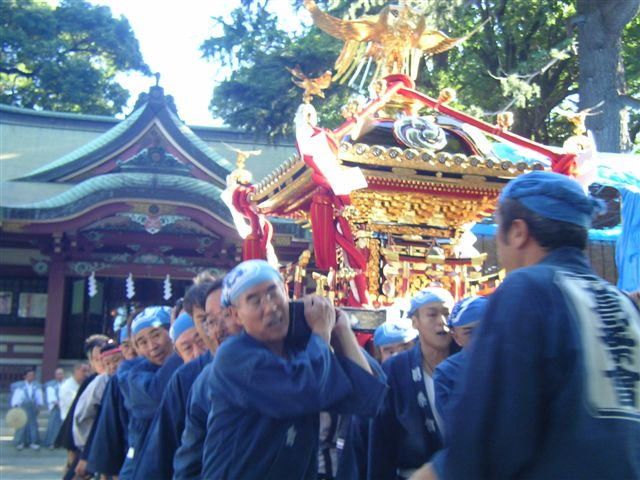
Kasai shrine Mikoshi

== Access ==
JR Joban line or Keisei line 10min walk from Kanamachi station
