= Kanamachi, Tokyo =

Kanamachi 金町
- District
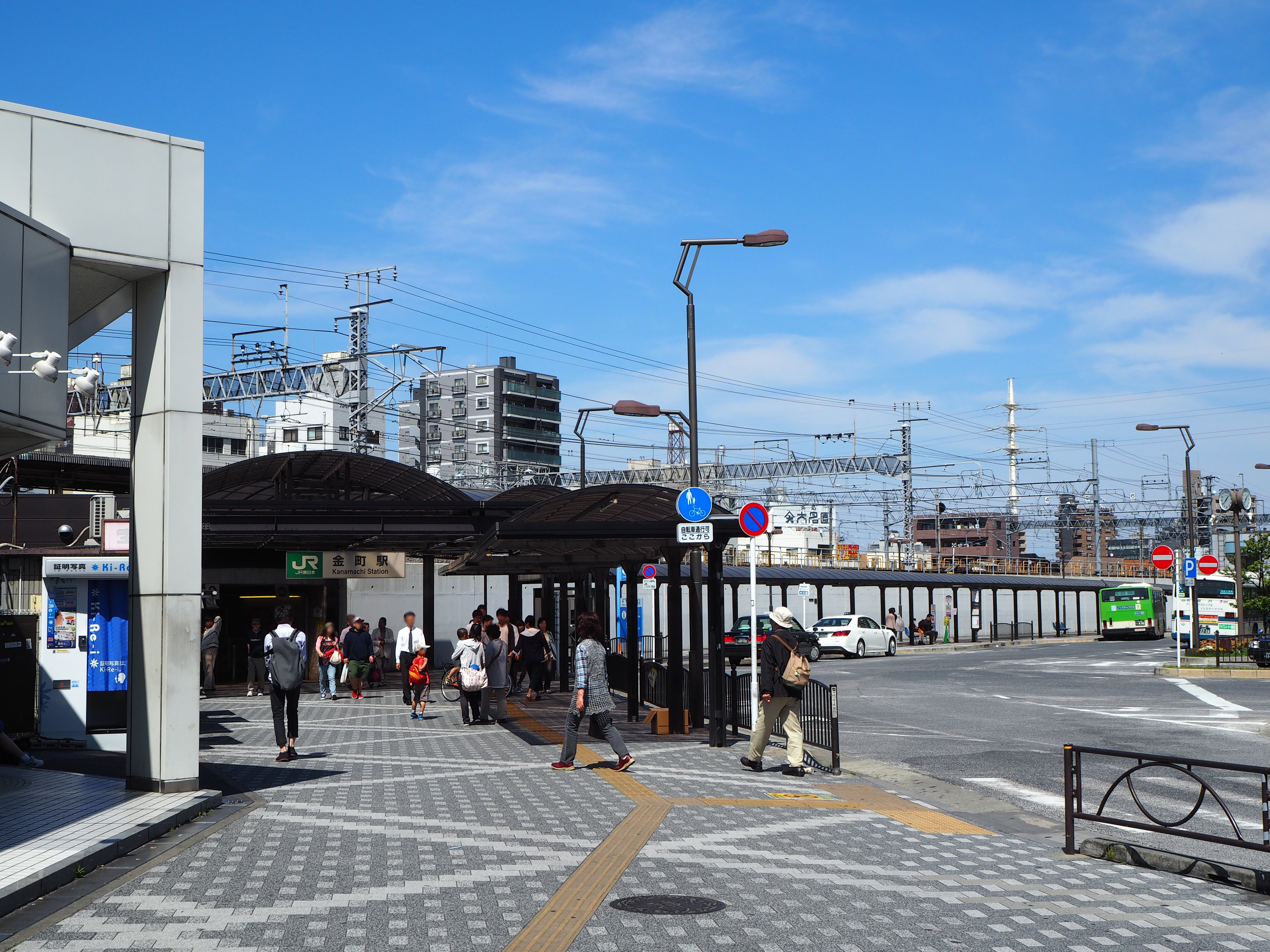
- Kanamachi Station

- Location within Tokyo
- Coordinates: 35°46′8.91″N 139°52′14.97″E
- Country: Japan
- City: Tokyo
- Ward: Katsushika

Population (December 1, 2017)
  - Total: 17,745
- Time zone: UTC+9 (JST)
- Postal code: 125-0042
- Area code: 03

Kanamachi (金町) is a district of Katsushika, Tokyo, Japan.

Kanamachi is the residential district to the south of Kanamachi Station. Kanamachi in a broader sense may also include Higashikanamachi, to the north of the station.

== Education ==
Katsushika City Board of Education operates area public elementary and junior high schools.

Kanamachi 1-2-chome is zoned to Shibahara Elementary School (柴原小学校). 3 and 6-chome and the Kanamachi Water Purification Plant are zoned to Kanamachi Elementary School (金町小学校). 4-5-chome are zoned to Suehiro Elementary School (末広小学校).

2-3 and 5-6 chome and the water plant, as well as parts of 1 and 4-chome, are zoned to Tokiwa Junior High School (常盤中学校). The rest of 1-chome and 4-chome are zoned to Niijuku Junior High School (新宿中学校).
