= Katsushika Symphony Hills =

Cultural centre in Katsushika, Tokyo, Japan

Katsushika Symphony Hills かつしかシンフォニーヒルズ
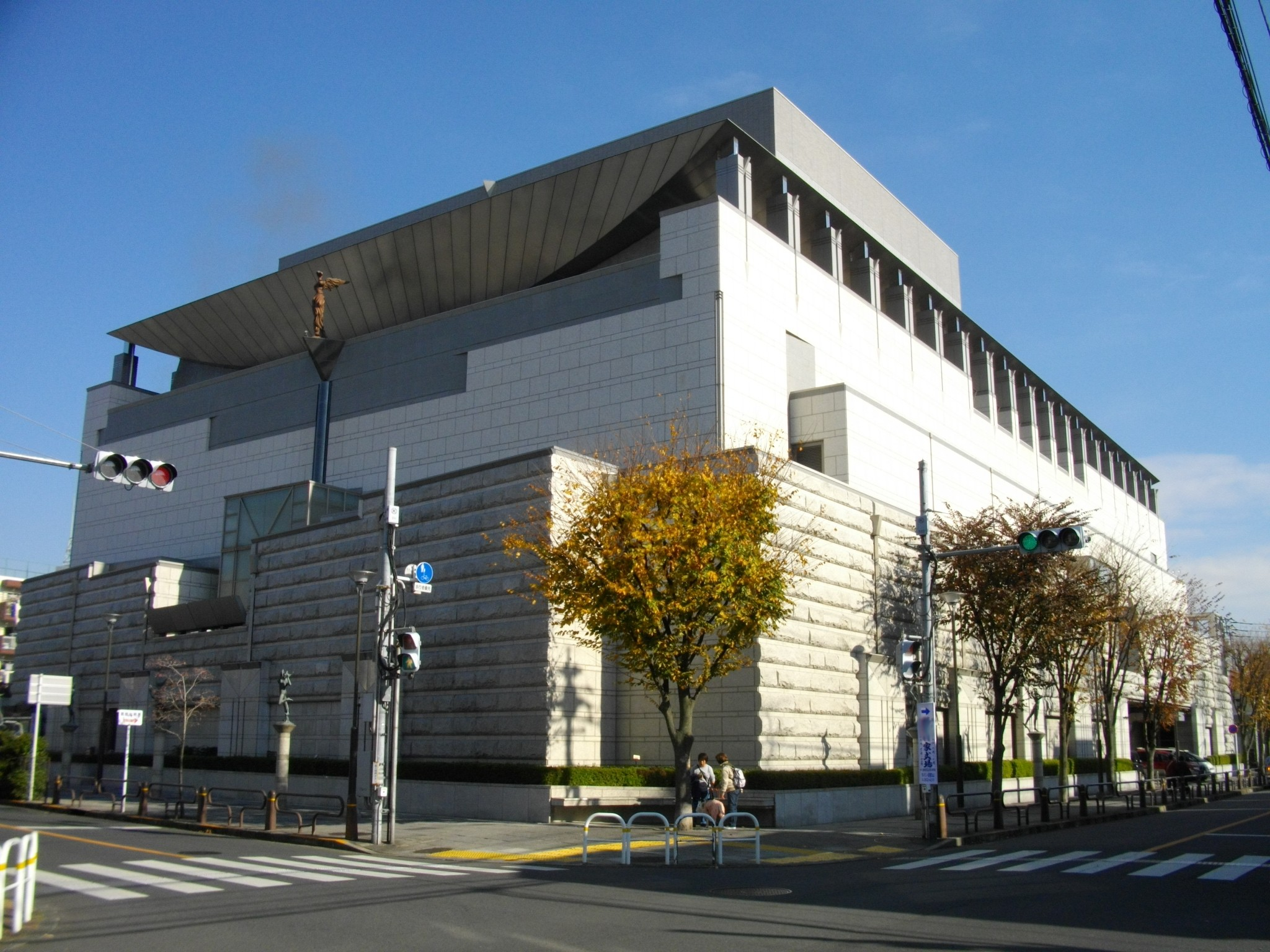
- Interactive map of the Katsushika Symphony Hills かつしかシンフォニーヒルズ area

General information
- Location: 6-365 Tateishi, Katsushika, Tokyo, Japan
- Coordinates: 35°44′33″N 139°51′8″E
- Cost: ¥ 10,600 million
- Owner: Katsushika Ward

Technical details
- Floor area: 14,045 m^{2}

Design and construction
- Architecture firm: AXS Satow Inc.
- Other designers: Nagata Acoustics

Website
- Hompepage (Jp)

References
- Factsheet

Katsushika Symphony Hills (かつしかシンフォニーヒルズ) also Katsushika Bunka Kaikan (葛飾区文化会館) is a cultural centre in Katsushika, Tokyo, Japan. The Mozart Hall seats 1318 and the Iris Hall has a capacity of 298. AXS Satow were the architects with acoustic design by Nagata Acoustics.

== See also ==
- Shibamata Taishakuten
