= Niijuku =

Niijuku 新宿
- District
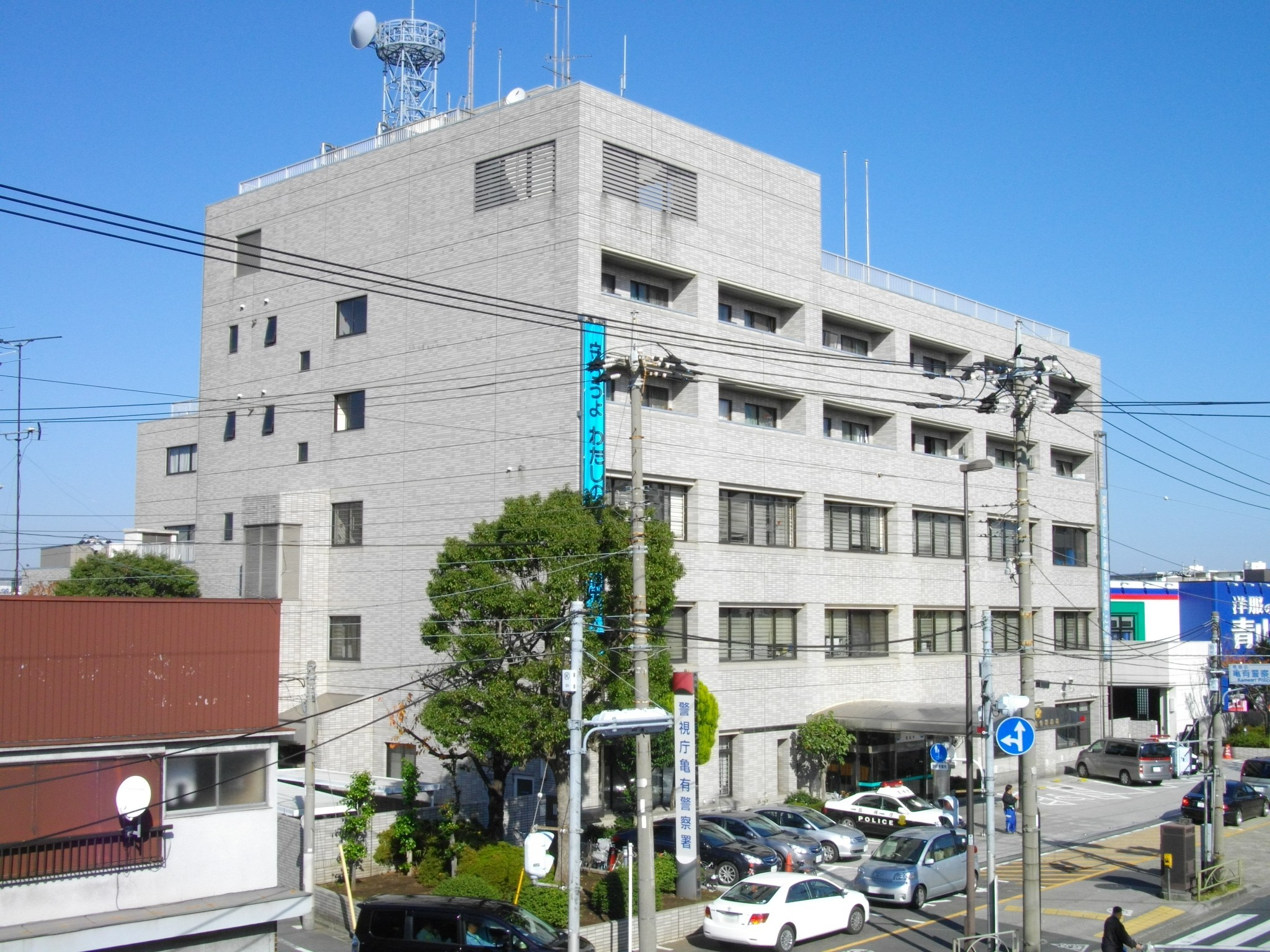
- Kameari Police Station

- Location within Tokyo
- Coordinates: 35°46′8.91″N 139°52′14.97″E
- Country: Japan
- City: Tokyo
- Ward: Katsushika

Population (December 1, 2017)
  - Total: 15,172
- Time zone: UTC+9 (JST)
- Postal code: 125-0051
- Area code: 03

Niijuku (新宿) is a district of Katsushika, Tokyo, Japan.

== Education ==
Katsushika City Board of Education operates area public elementary and junior high schools.

1 and 2 and 4 and 5-chome are zoned to Niijuku Elementary School (新宿小学校). 3-chome 1-28 ban are zoned to Shibahara Elementary School (柴原小学校) while 3-chome 29-33 ban are zoned to Sumiyoshi Elementary School (住吉小学校). The following parts of 6-chome are zoned to the following schools: 1 and 6-ban to Iizuka Elementary School (飯塚小学校), 2-ban to Higashi (East) Kanamachi Elementary School (東金町小学校), and 3-5 and 7-8 ban to Hananoki Elementary School (花の木小学校).

1-5-chome are zoned to Niijuku Junior High School (新宿中学校). 6-chome is zoned to Kanamachi Junior High School (金町中学校).
