= Higashikanamachi =

Higashikanamachi 東金町
- District
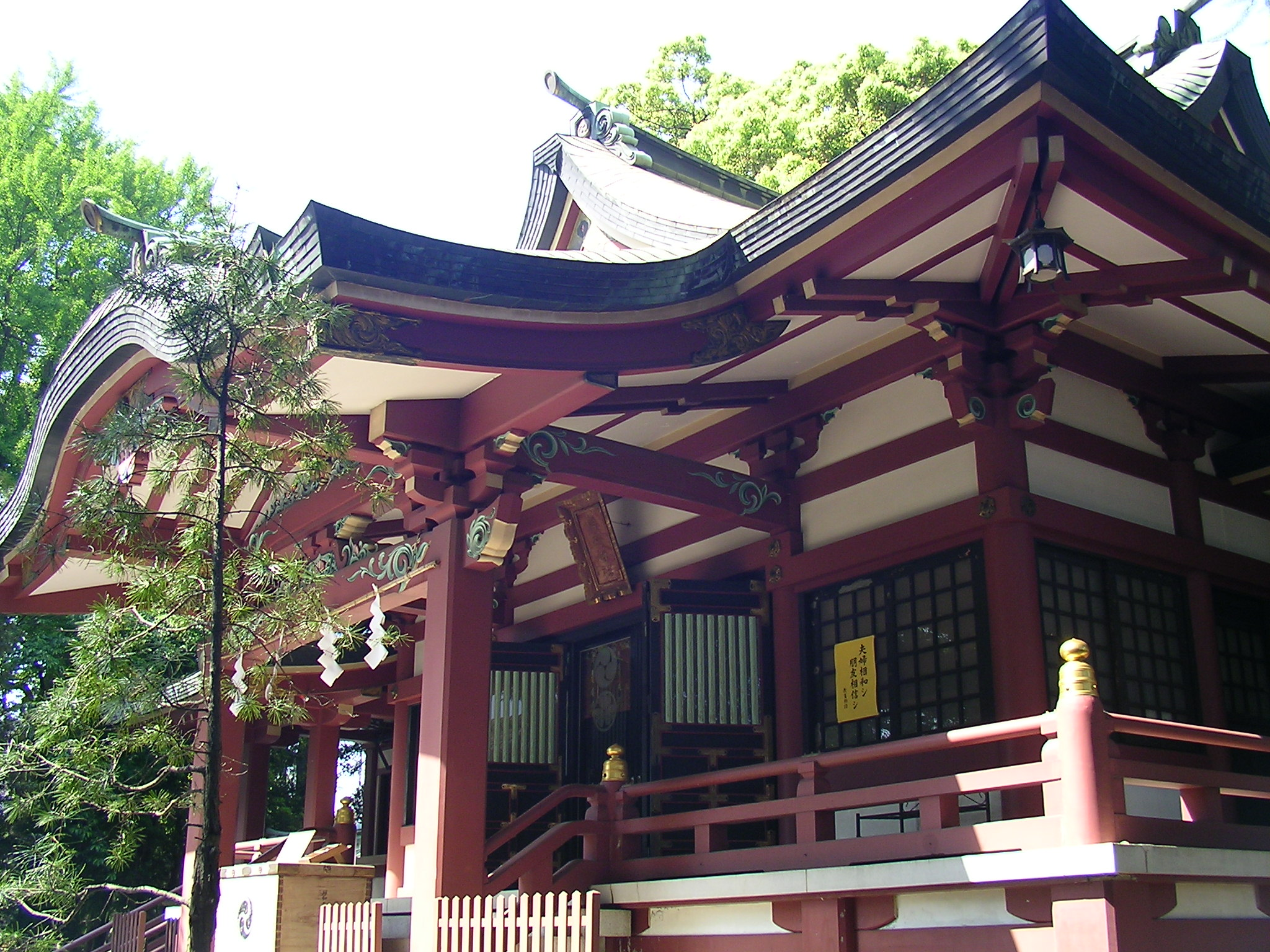

- Location within Tokyo
- Coordinates: 35°46′14.67″N 139°52′7.64″E
- Country: Japan
- City: Tokyo
- Ward: Katsushika

Population (December 1, 2017)
  - Total: 24,279
- Time zone: UTC+9 (JST)
- Postal code: 125-0041
- Area code: 03

Higashikanamachi (東金町) is a district of Katsushika, Tokyo, Japan.

== Education ==
Katsushika City Board of Education operates area public elementary and junior high schools.

Parts of 1-chome and 3-chome are zoned to Higashi (East) Kanamachi Elementary School (東金町小学校). 2-chome and part of 1-chome are zoned to Harada Elementary School (原田小学校). 4-5 and 7-8 chome and part of 6-chome are zoned to Handa Elementary School (半田小学校). The rest of 6-chome is zoned to Kanamachi Elementary School (金町小学校).

1-3 chome are zoned to Kanamachi Junior High School (金町中学校). 4-8 chome are zoned to Higashi Kanamachi Junior High School (東金町中学校).
