= Shinju =

Japanese Shinju can mean the following things:

- Shinjū (心中), double suicide
- Shinju (真珠), pearl
- Shinjū (novel), a 1994 fiction book by Laura Joh Rowland
- Shinju, a traditional Japanese breast bondage technique
