= Yumi Kumakura =

Japanese volleyball player (born 1978)

Yumi Kumakura (熊倉 由美, Kumakura Yumi) (born September 5, 1978, in Katsushika) is a Japanese volleyball player. She plays a V-Premier League team Takefuji Bamboo.

She entered Ito Yokado Prior in April 1997, after graduating from Kyoei High School. Kumakura played the World Youth Women's Volleyball Championship in 1995 as a Japanese representative (with Yoshie Takeshita, Hiromi Suzuki, Miyuki Mori, and Makiko Horai). Her team won the championship.
