= Aoto Station =

Railway station in Tokyo, Japan

KS09 Aoto Station 青砥駅
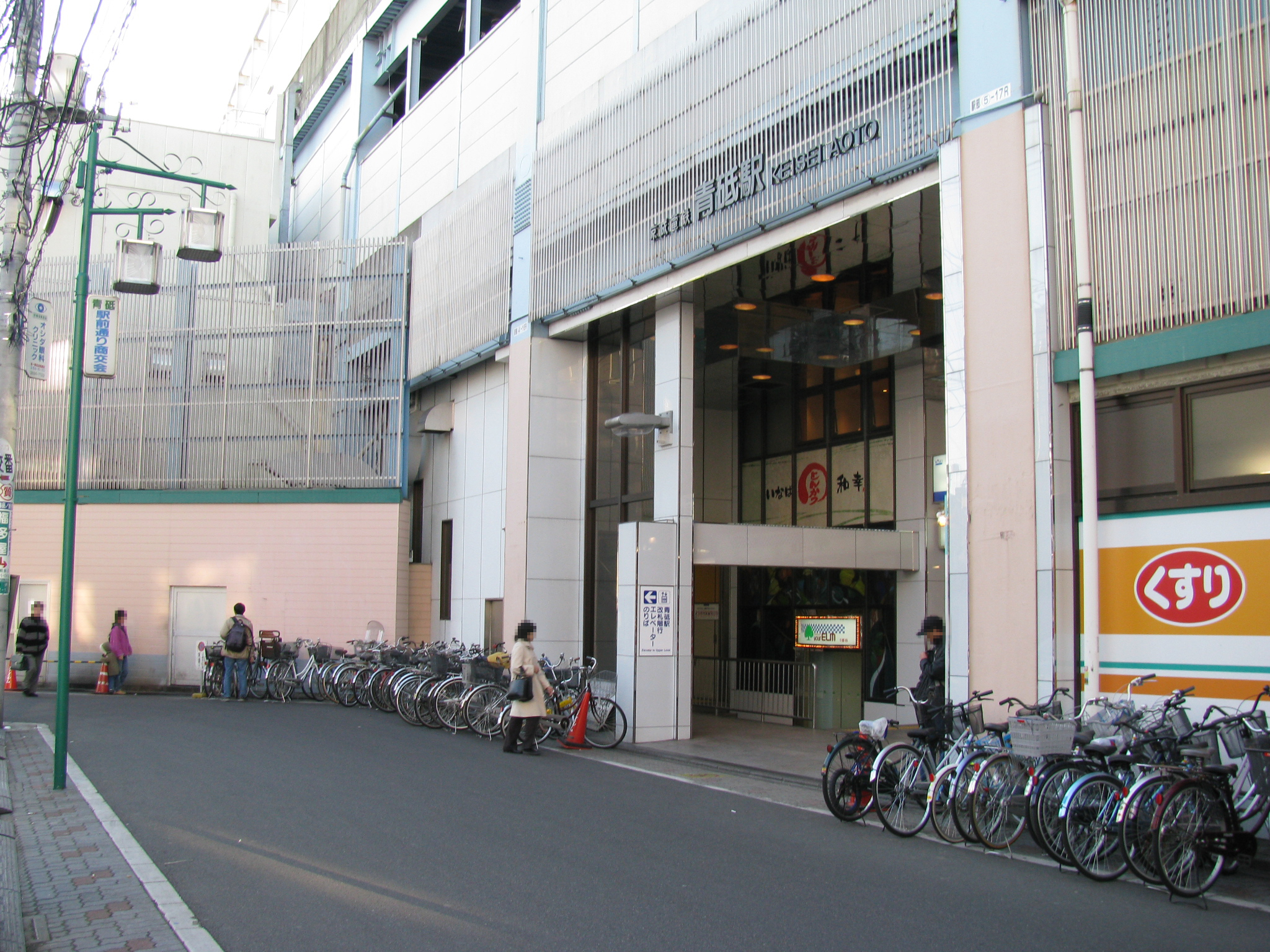
- Aoto Station entrance in January 2008

General information
- Location: 3-36-1 Aoto, Katsushika-ku, Tokyo; Japan
- Coordinates: 35°44′45.2″N 139°51′22.7″E
- Operator: Keisei Electric Railway
- Lines: Keisei Main Line; Keisei Oshiage Line
- Platforms: 2 island platforms
- Tracks: 4
- Connections: Bus stop

Other information
- Station code: KS09

History
- Opened: 1 November 1928

Passengers
- FY2015: 47,719 daily

Services
Preceding station	Keisei	Following station
Nippori KS02 towards Keisei Ueno	Skyliner (limited service)	Shin-Kamagaya HS08 towards Narita Airport Terminal 1
Nippori KS02 towards Keisei Ueno	Morningliner; Eveningliner	Keisei Funabashi KS22 towards Narita Airport Terminal 1
Nippori KS02 towards Keisei Ueno	Main Line Rapid Limited Express	Keisei Takasago KS10 towards Narita Airport Terminal 1
Nippori KS02 towards Keisei Ueno	Main Line Access Express	Keisei Takasago KS10 Terminus
Nippori KS02 towards Keisei Ueno	Main Line Limited Express Commuter Express	Keisei Takasago KS10 towards Narita Airport Terminal 1
Senjuōhashi KS05 towards Keisei Ueno	Main Line Rapid	Keisei Takasago KS10 towards Narita Airport Terminal 1
Ohanajaya KS08 towards Keisei Ueno	Main Line Local	Keisei Takasago KS10 towards Narita Airport Terminal 1
Oshiage KS45 Terminus	Oshiage Line Rapid Limited Express Access Express Limited Express Commuter Express Rapid	through to Main Line
Keisei Tateishi KS49 towards Oshiage	Oshiage Line Local	through to Main Line
Location
- Location within Tokyo

Aoto Station (青砥駅, Aoto-eki) is a railway station in Katsushika, Tokyo, Japan, operated by the private railway operator Keisei Electric Railway. The station is served by the Keisei Main Line and the Keisei Oshiage Line.

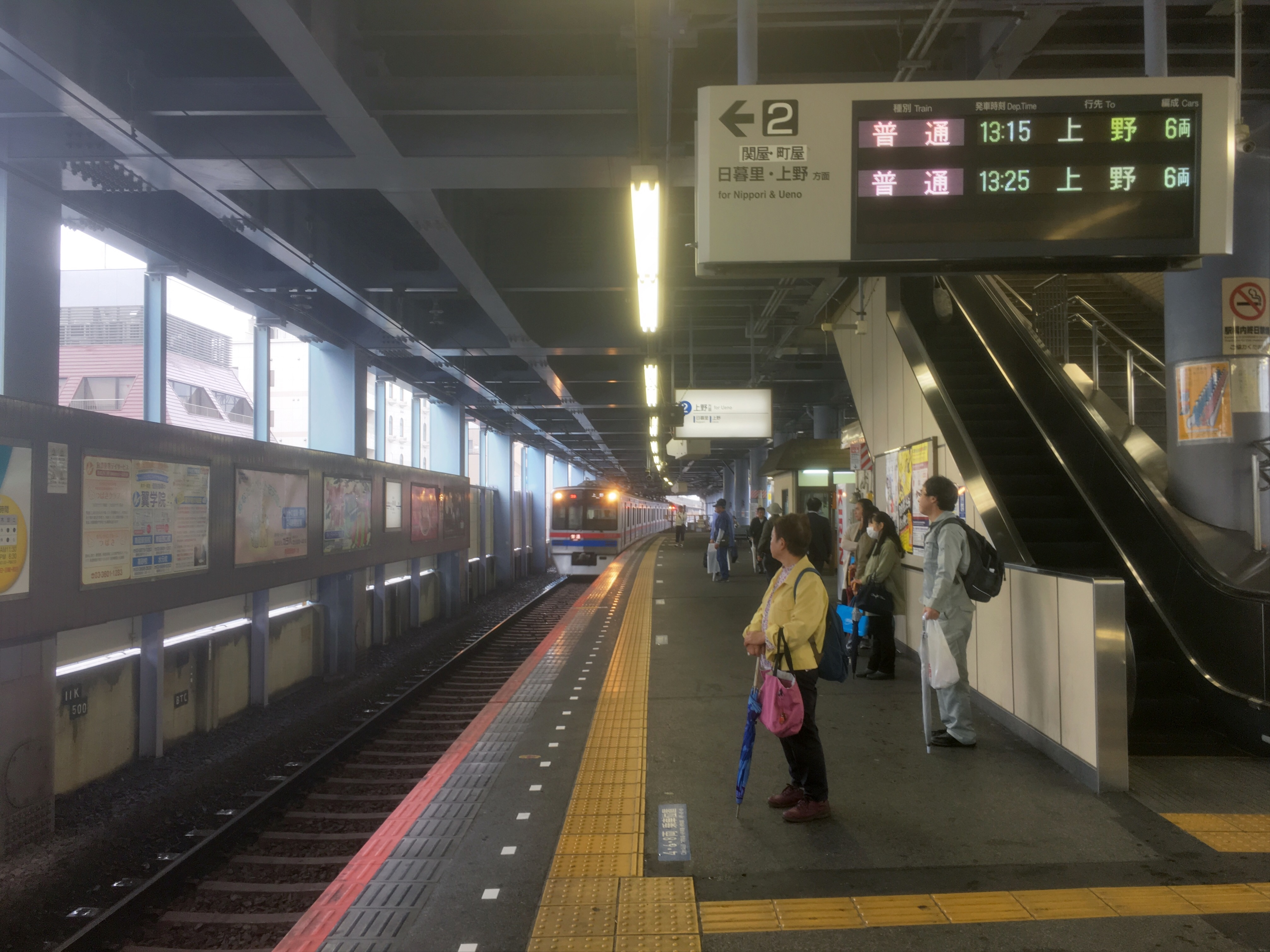
Station platform 2 and a train, 2019

== Layout ==
The station has two island platforms on different levels. The top level platform is for down trains (for Narita etc.) and the middle level platform is for up trains (for Ueno etc.). Down trains from the Keisei Oshiage line arrive at platform 3 and down trains from the Keisei main line arrive at platform 4.

=== Platforms ===
1	Keisei Oshiage Line	for Oshiage; Toei Asakusa Line for Nihombashi and Nishi-magome; Keikyu Main Line for Haneda Airport (Terminal 3 and Terminal 1·2) and Misakiguchi
2	Keisei Main Line	for Nippori and Keisei Ueno
3-4	Keisei Main Line	for Keisei-Takasago, Keisei Funabashi and Narita Airport (Terminal 2·3 and Terminal 1); Hokusō Line for Imba Nihon-idai; Narita Sky Access Line for Narita Airport

== History ==
- 1 November 1928: Station opens
- 24 March 1982: Oshiage Line outbound track elevated
- 18 May 1983: Main Line outbound track elevated
- 24 July 1984: Main Line and Oshiage Line inbound tracks elevated
- October 1986: Station construction completed
- 17 July 2010: Station numbering was introduced to all Keisei Line stations; Aoto was assigned station number KS09.
- 11 April 2020: Some Skyliner services began to stop at Aoto Station.

== Surrounding area ==
- Katsushika Symphony Hills

== See also ==
- List of railway stations in Japan
