= Oshiage Station =

Railway station in Tokyo, Japan

Coordinates: 35.7110°N 139.8133°E

TS03 KS45 Oshiage Station 'Skytree' 押上駅〈スカイツリー前〉

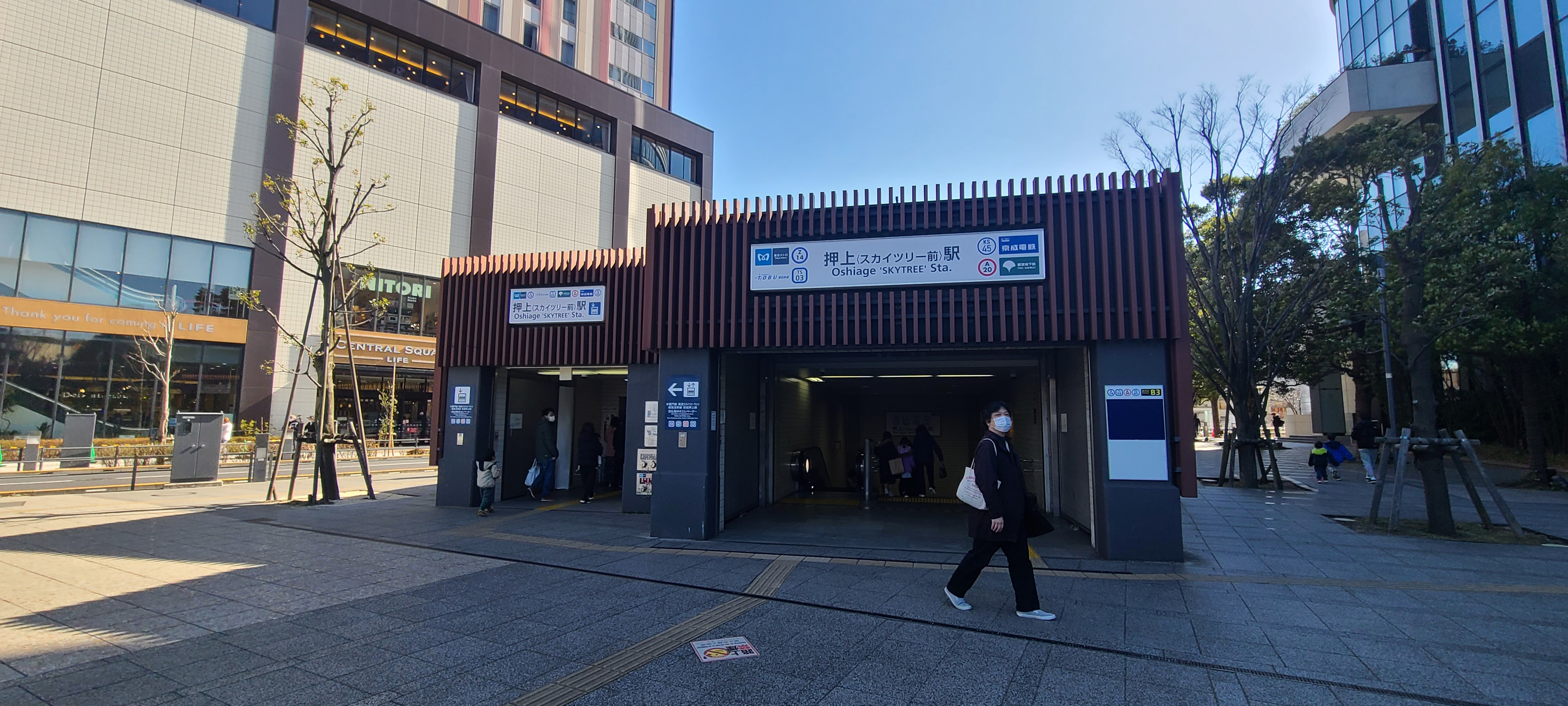
- Exit B3 in 2023

General information
- Location: 1 Oshiage, Sumida, Tokyo; Japan
- Operator: Hanzomon and Tobu Lines: Tokyo Metro (manager); Tobu Railway; Asakusa and Keisei Lines: Toei Subway; Keisei Electric Railway (manager)
- Lines: Keisei Oshiage Line; Tobu Skytree Line; Asakusa Line; Hanzōmon Line

Other information
- Station code: A-20 (Toei Asakusa Line); Z-14 (Hanzomon Line); TS-03 (Tobu); KS45 (Keisei)
Services
| Preceding station | Tobu Railway | Following station |
|---|---|---|
| through to Hanzomon Line | Tobu Skytree Line Express Semi Express | Hikifune TS04 towards Tōbu-Dōbutsu-Kōen |
| Preceding station | Keisei | Following station |
| through to Asakusa Line | Oshiage Line "Rapid" Limited Express Access Express Limited Express Commuter Express Rapid | Aoto KS09 Terminus |
| through to Asakusa Line | Oshiage Line Local | Keisei Hikifune KS46 towards Aoto |
| Preceding station | Tokyo Metro | Following station |
| Kinshicho towards Shibuya | Hanzōmon Line | through to Skytree Line |
| Preceding station | Toei Subway | Following station |
| Asakusa towards Sengakuji | Asakusa Line Airport Limited Express | through to Oshiage |
| Honjo-azumabashi towards Nishi-magome | Asakusa Line | through to Oshiage |
Track layout
Location
- Location within Special wards of Tokyo Location within Tokyo Bay and Bōsō Peninsula Location within Tokyo Location within Japan

Oshiage Station (押上駅, Oshiage-eki) is a railway station in Sumida, Tokyo, Japan, jointly operated by Tokyo Metro, Tobu Railway, Toei, and Keisei Electric Railway. It is adjacent to the Tokyo Skytree complex.

== Lines ==
Oshiage Station is served by the following lines. It is the terminal station of three lines.

- Keisei Oshiage Line (station number KS45) – through service to the Toei Asakusa Line
- Tobu Skytree Line (station number TS-03) – through service to the Tokyo Metro Hanzomon Line
- Toei Asakusa Line (station number A-20) – through service to the Keisei Oshiage Line
- Tokyo Metro Hanzōmon Line (station number Z-14) – through service to the Tobu Skytree Line

== Station layout ==
There are two sets of platforms, one for Keisei/Toei at level B1, and the other for Tokyo Metro/Tobu at level B3. Each consists of two island platforms serving four tracks.

=== Keisei/Toei ===
On the Keisei/Toei section, trains to Nishi-Magome and the Keikyu Network leave from platforms 1, 2 or 3. Trains for Aoto and the Keisei/Hokusō/Shibayama network leave from platforms 3 and 4, although Keisei and Hokusō trains can also use platform 2.

| 1–3 | Asakusa Line | for Asakusa, Nihombashi, Shimbashi, and Nishi-magome; Keikyu Main Line for Shinagawa, Haneda Airport (International Terminal and Domestic Terminal), Yokohama, and Misakiguchi |
| 3–4 | Keisei Oshiage Line | for Aoto; Keisei Main Line for Keisei Funabashi, Keisei Narita, and Narita Airport (Terminal 2·3 and Terminal 1); Hokusō Line for Imba Nihon-idai; Narita Sky Access Line for Imba Nihon-idai and Narita Airport; Shibayama Railway Line for Shibayama-Chiyoda |

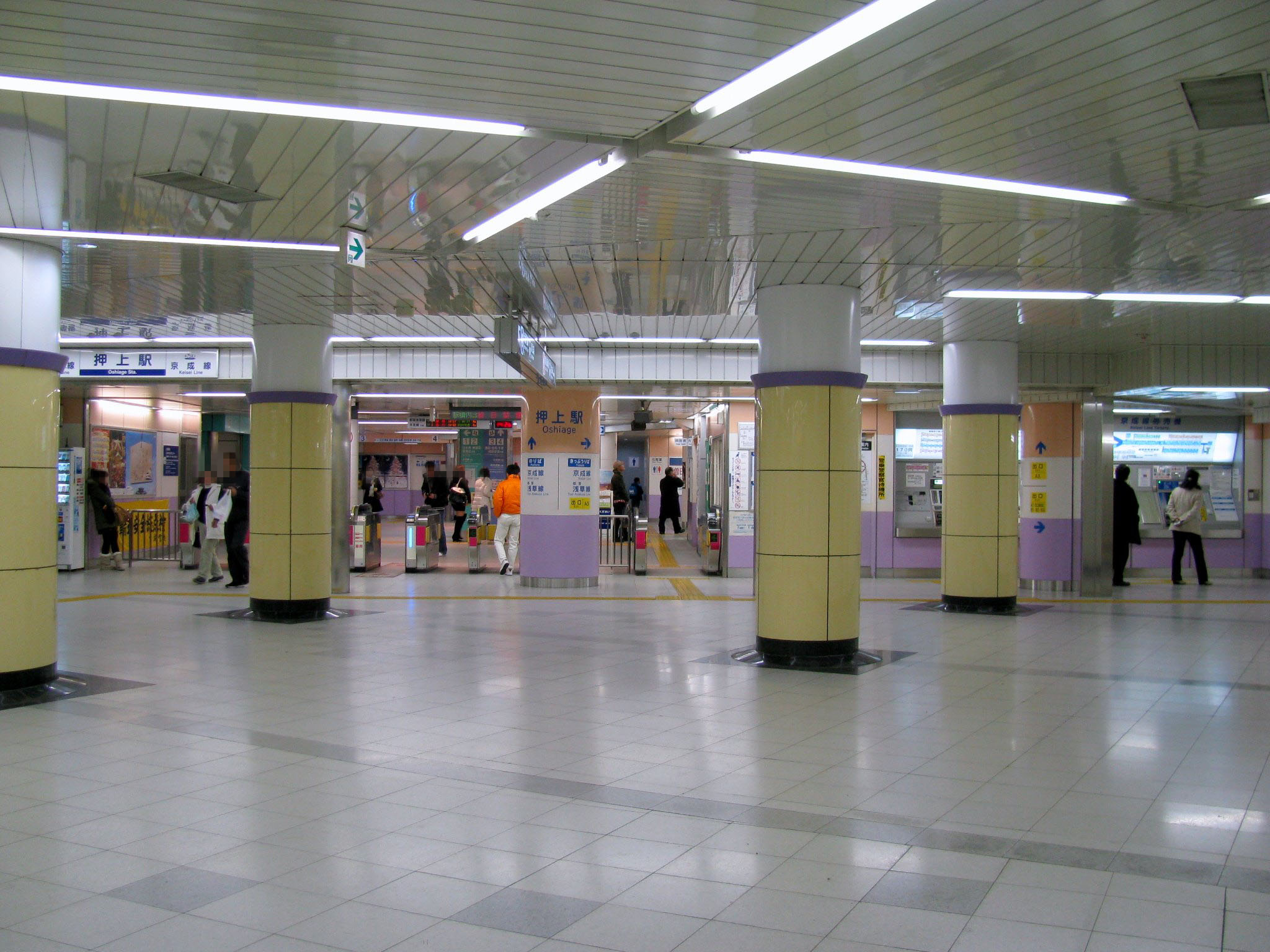
Keisei ticket gates

=== Tokyo Metro/Tobu ===
| 1–3 | Hanzōmon Line | for Shibuya; Den-en-toshi Line for Chuo-Rinkan |
| 4 | Tobu Skytree Line | for Kita-Koshigaya and Tōbu-Dōbutsu-Kōen; Tobu Isesaki Line for Kuki; Tōbu Nikkō Line for Minami-Kurihashi |

Platform 1 is used by through services from the Tobu Skytree Line. Platforms 2 and 3 are used by Hanzomon Line services terminating and starting at this station.

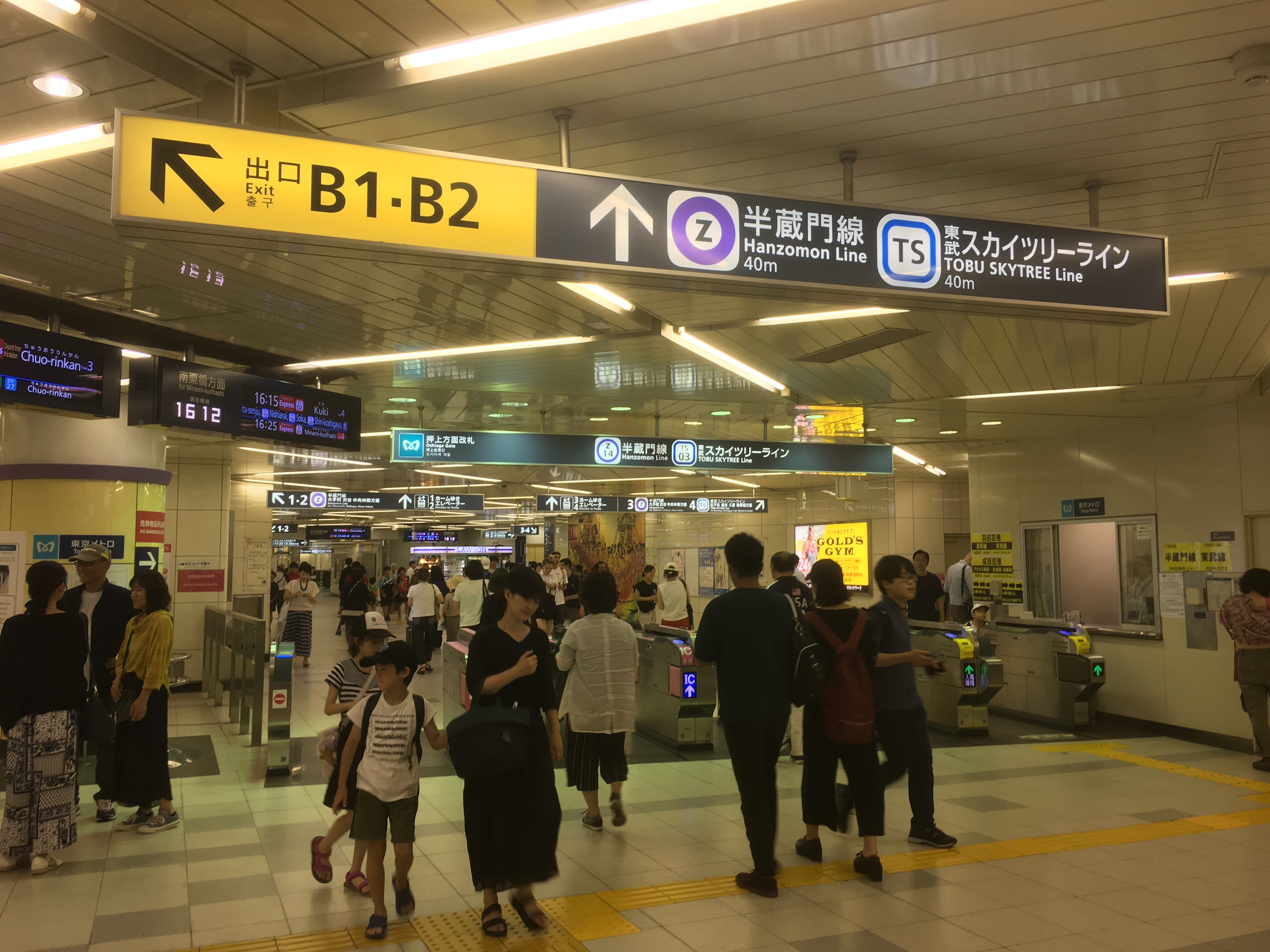
Tokyo Metro ticket gates

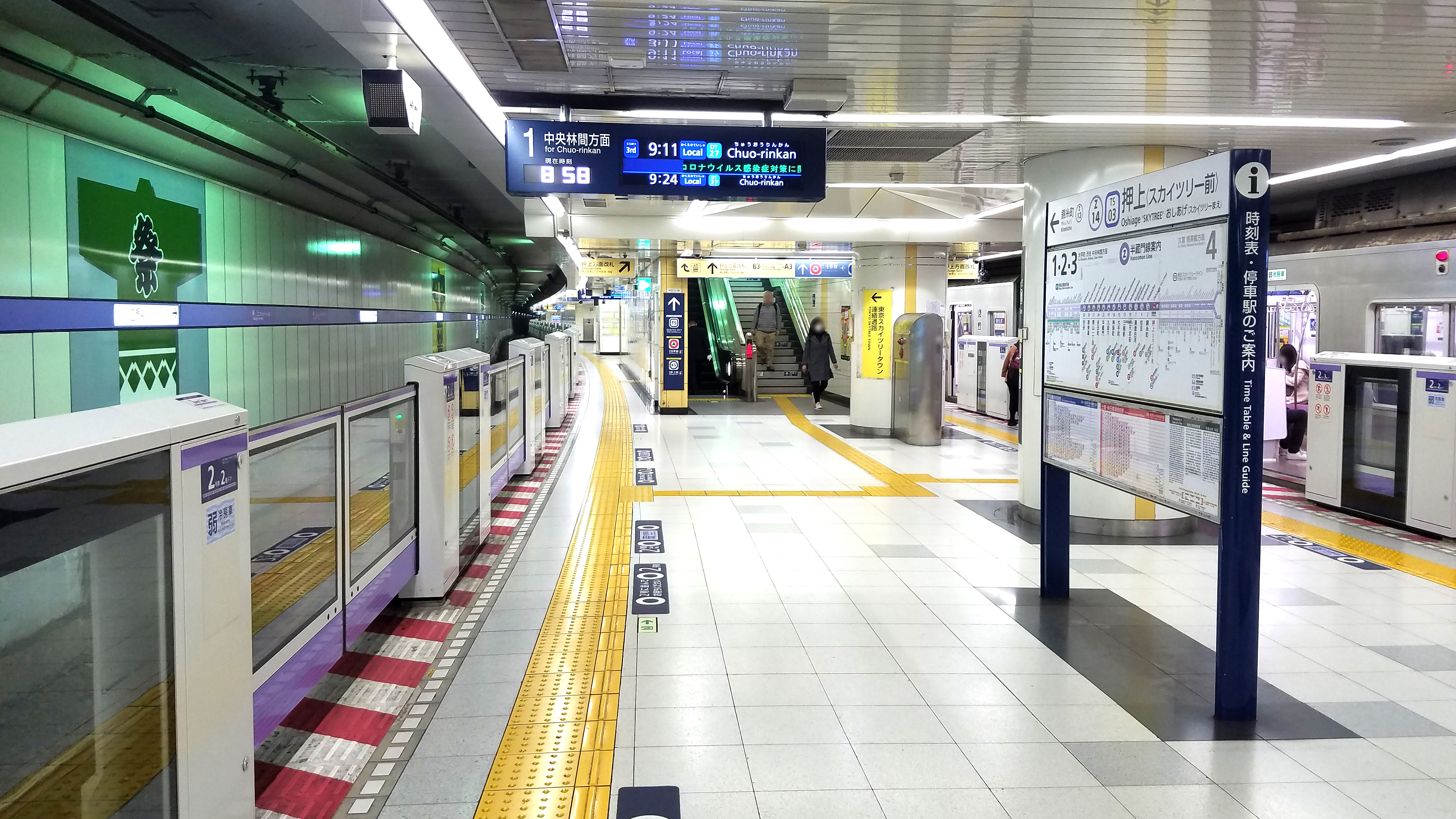
Tokyo Metro platforms, 2020

Track diagram for the Tokyo Metro and Tobu lines

== History ==
The Keisei station opened on 3 November 1912. The Keisei station was moved underground in 1960 in preparation of the opening of Line 1 of the Toei Subway (present day Toei Asakusa Line). Line 1 would open for revenue service on 4 December of that year.

The Tobu station opened on 19 March 2003.

The Hanzomon Line platforms were inherited by Tokyo Metro after the privatization of the Teito Rapid Transit Authority (TRTA) in 2004.

Station numbering was introduced to all Keisei Line stations on 17 July 2010; Oshiage Station on the Keisei Line was assigned station number KS45.

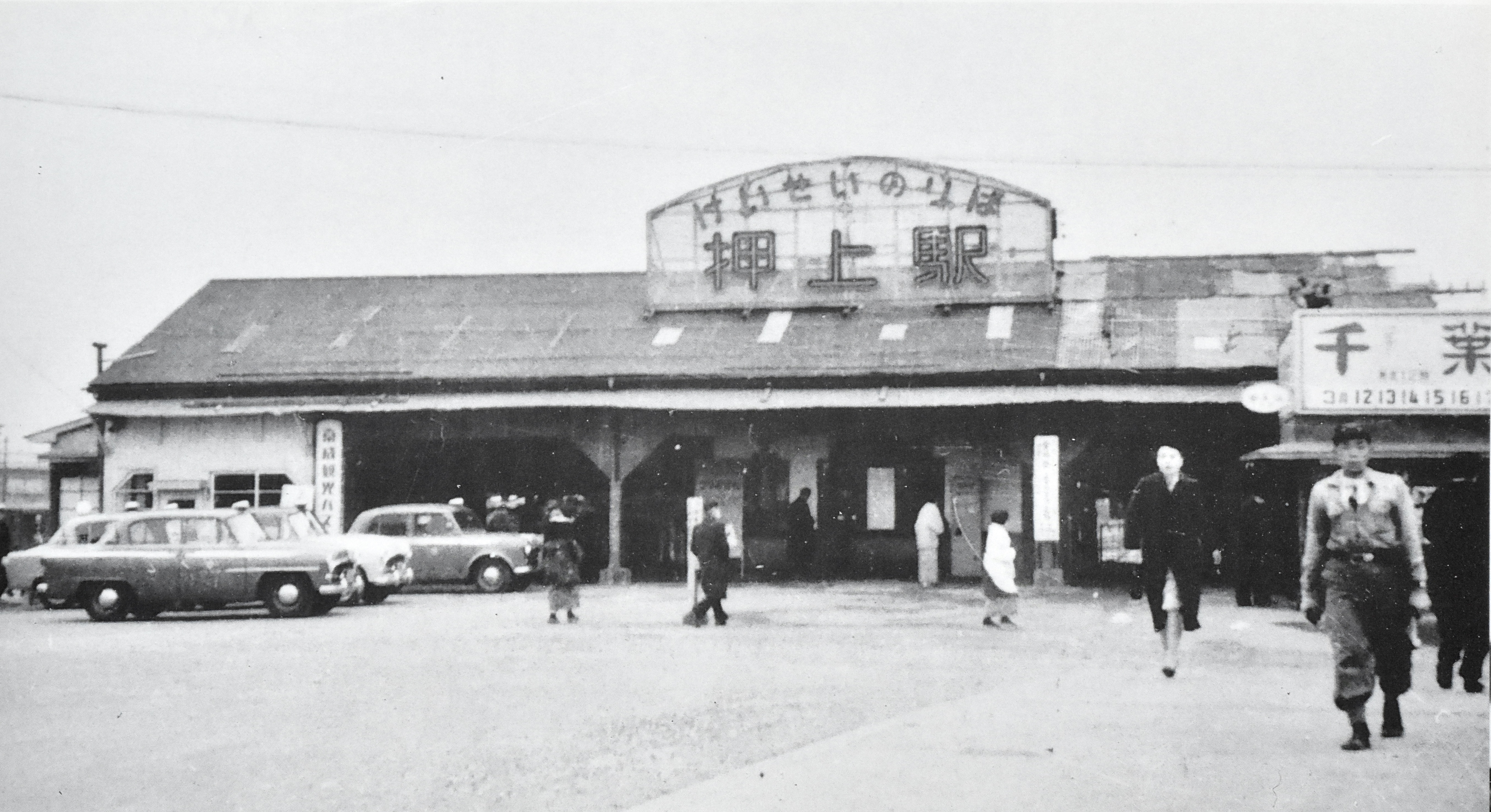
Oshiage Station circa 1955

== Surrounding area ==
The station is located at the Oshiage-eki-mae intersection of Metropolitan Routes 453 and 465 (Asakusa-dōri and Yotsume-dōri respectively).

Tokyo Skytree is nearby and Tokyo Skytree Station is within 10 minutes walk.

== See also ==
- List of railway stations in Japan
