= Katsushika =

Katsushika 葛飾区
- Special ward
- Katsushika City
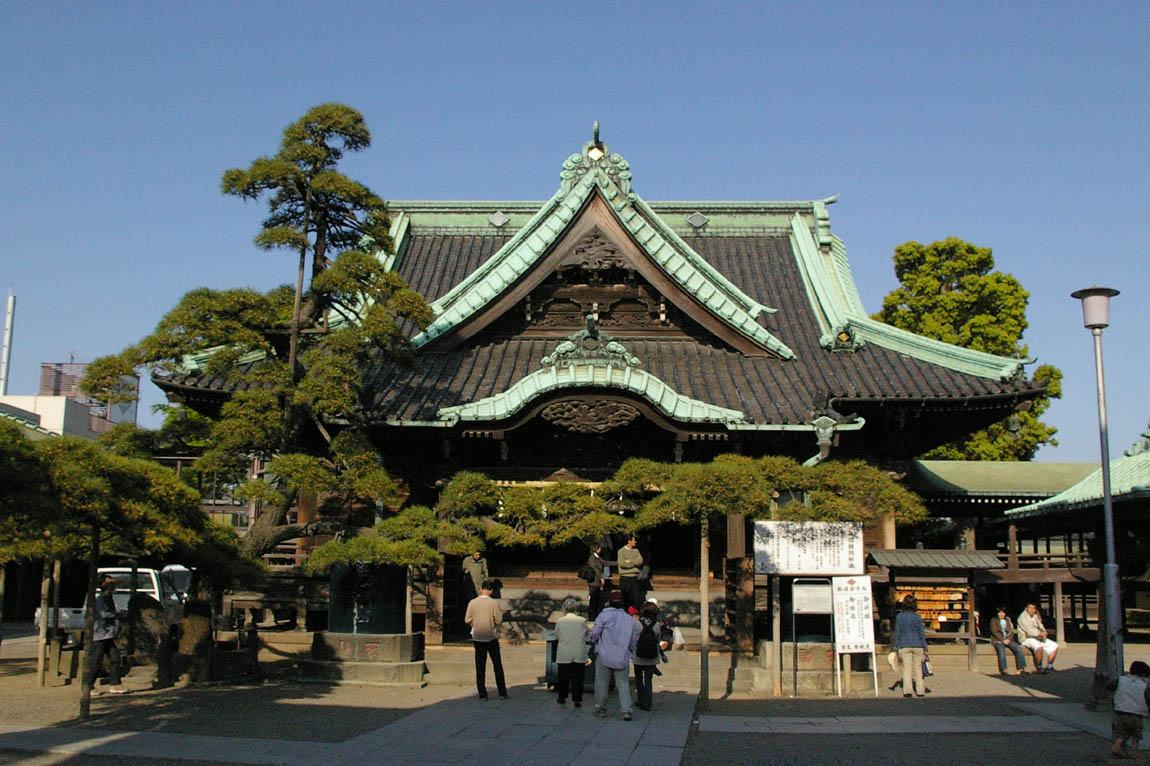
- Shibamata Taishaku-ten in Katsushika

- Flag Emblem

- Interactive map of Katsushika
- Location in Japan
- Coordinates: 35°44′N 139°51′E
- Country: Japan
- Region: Kantō
- Prefecture: Tokyo Metropolis

Government
  - Mayor: Katsunori Aoki (since December 2009)

Area
  - Total: 34.80 km^{2} (13.44 sq mi)

Population (October 1, 2020)
  - Total: 453,093
  - Density: 13,019/km^{2} (33,720/sq mi)
- Time zone: UTC+09:00 (JST)
- City hall address: 5-13-1 Tateishi, Katsushika-ku, Tokyo; 124-8555
- Website: www.city.katsushika.lg.jp
- Symbols
- Flower: Iris
- Tree: Willow

Katsushika (葛飾区, Katsushika-ku; Japanese pronunciation: [kä̀.t͡sɨ́.ɕi̥.kä̀, -kä́(.kɯ̈̀)]) is a special ward in the Tokyo Metropolis in Japan. It is known as Katsushika City in English.

As of May 1, 2015, the ward has an estimated population of 444,356, and a population density of 12,770 people per km^{2}. The total area is 34.80 km^{2}.

== Geography ==
Katsushika Ward is at the east end of Tokyo Metropolis. It is on an alluvial plain and it is low above sea level.

The ward office (Katsushika city hall) is located at Tateishi.

=== Boundaries ===
Katsushika has boundaries with three wards of Tokyo: Adachi, Edogawa and Sumida. The cities of Matsudo in Chiba Prefecture, and Misato and Yashio in Saitama Prefecture form the northeast border of the ward.

=== Rivers ===
Major rivers in Katsushika include the Edogawa, Arakawa and Ayasegawa. Nakagawa and Shin-nakagawa flows through the ward.

=== Districts and neighborhoods ===
Kameari-Aoto Area

- Aoto
- Kameari
- Nishikameari
- Shiratori

Kanamachi-Niijuku Area

- Higashikanamachi
- Kanamachi
- Kanamachijōsuijō
- Niijuku
- Tōganemachi

Minamiayase-Ohanadjaya-Horikiri Area

- Higashihorikiri
- Horikiri
- Kosuge
- Ohanajaya

Mizumoto Area

- Higashimizumoto
- Minamimizumoto
- Mizumoto
- Mizumotokoen
- Nishimizumoto

Okudo-Shinkoiwa Area

- Higashishinkoiwa
- Nishishinkoiwa
- Okudo
- Shinkoiwa

Shibamata-Takasago Area

- Hosoda
- Kamakura
- Shibamata
- Takasago

Tateishi-Yotsugi Area

- Higashitateishi
- Higashiyotsugi
- Takaramachi
- Tateishi
- Yotsugi

== History ==
Katsushika District was originally a division of Musashi Province. When the province was divided and reconfigured, the district was partitioned between Kita-Katsushika District (within Saitama Prefecture), Higashi-Katsushika District (within Chiba Prefecture) and the remainder was based in Tokyo Prefecture. Minami-Katsushika District conformed today's Katsushika Ward proper, plus Edogawa, Koto and Sumida wards.

On October 1, 1932, the former Minami-Katsushika District of what was then known as Tokyo Prefecture, and its seven towns and villages, merged and became part of the old Tokyo City.

The special ward was founded on March 15, 1947.

Katsushika contains the Kasai Shrine, Narihira Santosen Temple, the "Bound Jizō" of Ōoka Echizen, and Shibamata Taishakuten, selected as one of the 100 Soundscapes of Japan and 100 Landscapes of Japan (Heisei era).

== Demographics ==
Historical population
| Year | Pop. | ±% |
|---|---|---|
| 1920 | 27,661 | — |
| 1930 | 84,456 | +205.3% |
| 1940 | 153,041 | +81.2% |
| 1945 | 171,557 | +12.1% |
| 1950 | 244,832 | +42.7% |
| 1960 | 376,724 | +53.9% |
| 1970 | 462,954 | +22.9% |
| 1980 | 420,187 | −9.2% |
| 1990 | 424,801 | +1.1% |
| 2000 | 421,519 | −0.8% |
| 2010 | 442,586 | +5.0% |
| 2020 | 453,093 | +2.4% |
Source: Censuses (Note: For years prior to 1930, figures cover the area of present-day Katsushika-ku.)

== Economy ==
Takara Tomy has its headquarters in Katsushika.

== Government and infrastructure ==
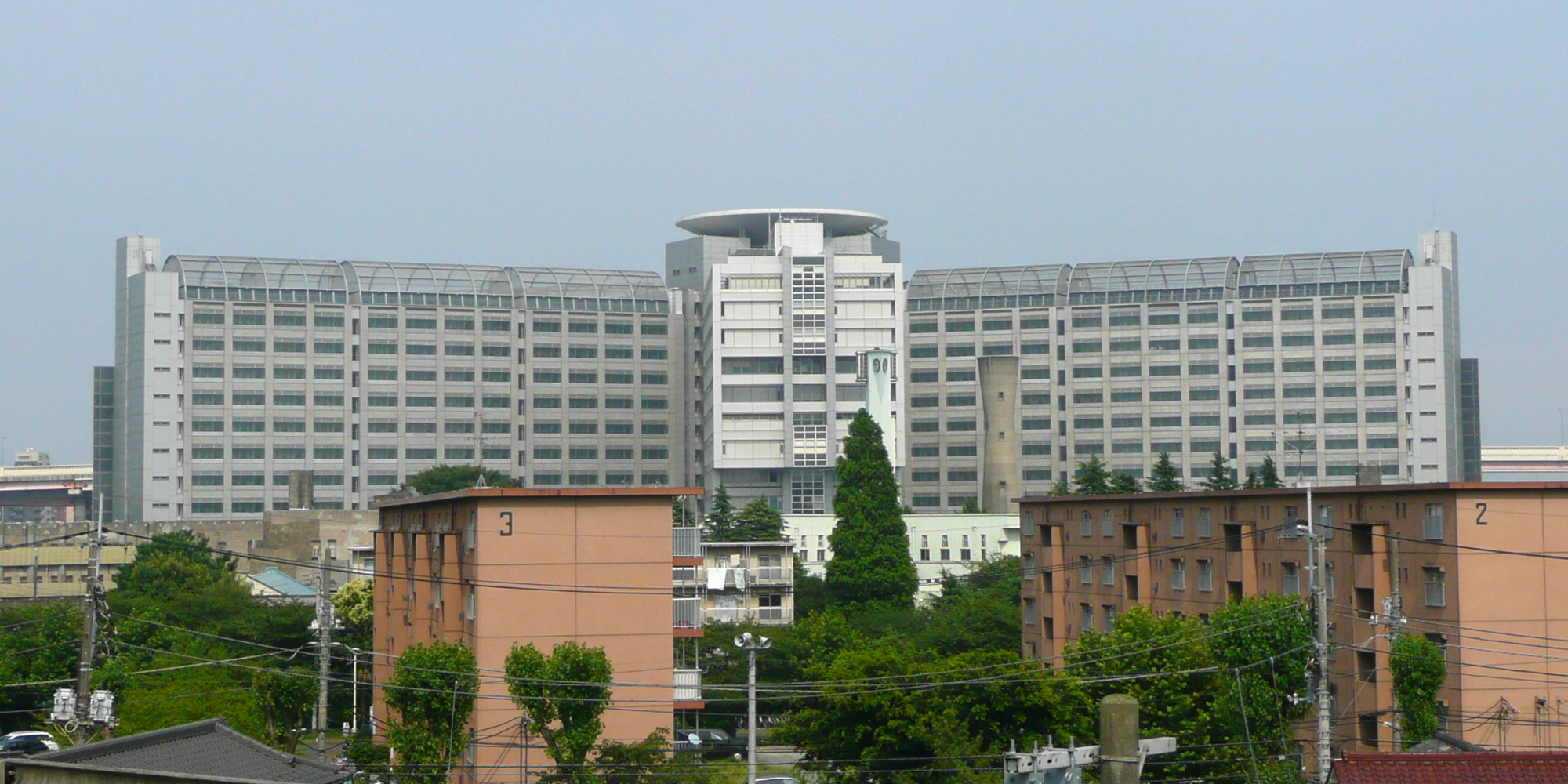
Tokyo Detention House

The Tokyo Detention House, a correctional facility, is in the ward. One of Japan's seven execution chambers is located there.

== Education ==
=== Colleges and universities ===
- Tokyo Seiei College
- Tokyo University of Science

=== Metropolitan schools ===
Tokyo Metropolitan Government Board of Education operates public high schools.

- Katsushika Commercial High School
- Katsushika Sogo High School
- Katsushikano High School
- Honjo Technical High School
- Minami (South) Katsushika High School
- Nousan High School

Special school:

- Katsushika School for the Blind (東京都立葛飾盲学校)

=== Municipal schools ===
Katsushika City Board of Education operates public elementary and junior high schools.

Municipal junior high schools:

- Aoba Junior High School (青葉中学校)
- Aoto Junior High School (青戸中学校)
- Ayase Junior High School (綾瀬中学校)
- Daido Junior High School (大道中学校)
- Futaba Junior High School (双葉中学校)
- Higashi (East) Kanamachi Junior High School (東金町中学校)
- Honda Junior High School (本田中学校)
- Horikiri Junior High School (堀切中学校)
- Ichinodai Junior High School (一之台中学校)
- Kamihirai Junior High School (上平井中学校)
- Kameari Junior High School (亀有中学校)
- Kanamachi Junior High School (金町中学校)
- Katsumi Junior High School (葛美中学校)
- Komatsu Junior High School (小松中学校)
- Mizumoto Junior High School (水元中学校)
- Nakagawa Junior High School (中川中学校)
- Nijuku Junior High School (新宿中学校)
- Okudo Junior High School (奥戸中学校)
- Sakuramichi Junior High School (桜道中学校)
- Shinkoiwa Junior High School (新小岩中学校)
- Takasago Junior High School (高砂中学校)
- Tateishi Junior High School (立石中学校)
- Tokiwa Junior High School (常盤中学校)
- Yotsugi Junior High School (四ツ木中学校)

Elementary schools include:

- Aoto Elementary School (青戸小学校)
- Futakami Elementary School (二上小学校)
- Hananoki Elementary School (花の木小学校)
- Handa Elementary School (半田小学校)
- Harada Elementary School (原田小学校)
- Higashi (East) Ayase Elementary School (東綾瀬小学校)
- Higashi Kanamachi Elementary School (東金町小学校)
- Higashi Mizumoto Elementary School (東水元小学校)
- Higashi Shibamata Elementary School (東柴又小学校)
- Higashi Yotsugi Elementary School (東四つ木小学校)
- Hokizuka Elementary School (宝木塚小学校)
- Honden Elementary School (本田小学校)
- Horikiri Elementary School (堀切小学校)
- Hosoda Elementary School (細田小学校)
- Iizuka Elementary School (飯塚小学校)
- Kamakura Elementary School (鎌倉小学校)
- Kameo Elementary School (亀青小学校)
- Kamichiba Elementary School (上千葉小学校)
- Kamihirai Elementary School (上平井小学校)
- Kamikomatsu Elementary School (上小松小学校)
- Kanamachi Elementary School (金町小学校)
- Katsushika Elementary School (葛飾小学校)
- Kawabata Elementary School (川端小学校)
- Kitano Elementary School (北野小学校)
- Koda Elementary School (幸田小学校)
- Komatsuminami Elementary School (小松南小学校)
- Kosuge Elementary School (こすげ小学校)
- Matsukami Elementary School (松上小学校)
- Michiue Elementary School (道上小学校)
- Minami (South) Ayase Elementary School (南綾瀬小学校)
- Minamiokudo Elementary School (南奥戸小学校)
- Mizumoto Elementary School (水元小小学校)
- Naka Aoto Elementary School (中青戸小学校)
- Nakanodai Elementary School (中之台小学校)
- Nichikosuge Elementary School (西小菅小学校)
- Nijuku Elementary School (新宿小学校)
- Nishi (West) Kameari Elementary School (西亀有小学校)
- Okudo Elementary School (奥戸小学校)
- Ryonan Elementary School (綾南小学校)
- Seiwa Elementary School (清和小学校)
- Shibahara Elementary School (柴原小学校)
- Shibamata Elementary School (柴又小学校)
- Shiratori Elementary School (白鳥小学校)
- Suehiro Elementary School (末広小学校)
- Sumiyoshi Elementary School (住吉小学校)
- Takasogo Elementary School (高砂小学校)
- Umeda Elementary School (梅田小学校)
- Yotsugi Elementary School (よつぎ小学校)

Special schools:

- Hota Shiosai Elementary School (保田しおさい学校) - Note it is physically located in Kyonan, Awa District, Chiba Prefecture, but it is a municipally-operated school by Katsushika City.

== Transportation ==
=== Rail ===
- JR East
  - Joban Line: Kameari, Kanamachi Stations
  - Sobu Main Line: Shin-Koiwa Station
- Keisei Electric Railway
  - Keisei Main Line: Horikiri-shobuen, Ohanajaya, Aoto, Keisei Takasago Stations
  - Keisei Oshiage Line: Yotsugi, Keisei Tateishi, Aoto Stations
  - Keisei Kanamachi Line: Keisei Takasago, Shibamata, Keisei Kanamachi Stations
- Hokuso Railway Hokuso Line: Keisei Takasago, Shin-Shibamata Stations

=== Highways ===
- Shuto Expressway C2 Central Loop (Itabashi JCT - Kasai JCT)
- Route 6 (Mito Kaidō)
- Kan-nana
- Kuramae bashi
- Heiwa bashi
- Shibamata Kaidō
- Okudo Kaidō
- Tokyo Route 307 Oji-Kanamachi-Edogawa line (Oji-ekimae to Minami-shinozaki)

== Notable works set in Katsushika ==
Katsushika is the setting for the longest-running manga series in history, Kochira Katsushika-ku Kameari Kōen-mae Hashutsujo. The neighborhood of Shibamata is the home of Tora-san, the protagonist of the long-running Otoko wa Tsurai yo film series, played by Kiyoshi Atsumi. A statue of Tora-san stands outside of Shibamata Station. Other notable works set in Katsushika are the television series Kamen Rider Hibiki and the TV drama series Long Vacation. A statue of Captain Tsubasa main character, Tsubasa Ozora, is also located there, as the fictional town of Nankatsu was inspired by Katsushika itself.

== Notable people ==
- Osamu Akimoto, manga artist, creator of Kochira Katsushika-ku Kameari Kōen-mae Hashutsujo
- Rumi Hiiragi, actress, voice actress (Spirited Away, Ponyo on the Cliff by the Sea)
- Susumu Hirasawa, progressive-electronic musician
- Minako Honda, singer, musical actress
- Yui Horie, singer, voice actress
- Asuka Saitō, actress, model
- Takaaki Ishibashi, owarai comedian, actor, singer
- Satomi Kobayashi, actress
- Yumi Kumakura, volleyball player
- Tomu Muto, tarento
- Kazunari Ninomiya, singer, actor, voice actor, presenter
- Kenny Omega, Professional Wrestler
- Miho Takagi, actress, essayist
- Youichi Takahashi, manga artist, creator of Captain Tsubasa

== Sister cities ==
Katsushika has sister-city relationships with Fengtai District in Beijing, China, and with Floridsdorf, a district of Vienna, Austria.
