= Sanya (disambiguation) =

Sanya (Chinese: 三亚市; Sanya City) is a city in Hainan, China.

Sanya may also refer to:

== Places ==
- Sanya Bay (Chinese: 三亚湾) a bay in the county of Sanya City, Hainan, China
- San'ya (Japanese: 山谷), a place in Tokyo, Japan
- San'ya Station, Ōta, Tokyo, Japan; former name of rail station Ōmorimachi Station

== People ==
- Sanya (name)

=== Fictional characters ===
- Sanya V. Litvyak, a character in the Strike Witches anime
- Sanya, a character in The Dresden Files

== Other uses ==
- Sanya (TV series), an Indian sitcom

== See also ==
- San (disambiguation)
- Ya (disambiguation)
- Sanja (disambiguation)
- Sania (disambiguation) (name)
