= Ōmorikaigan Station =

Railway station in Tokyo, Japan

Coordinates: 35°35′15″N 139°44′07″E

KK07 Ōmorikaigan Station 大森海岸駅
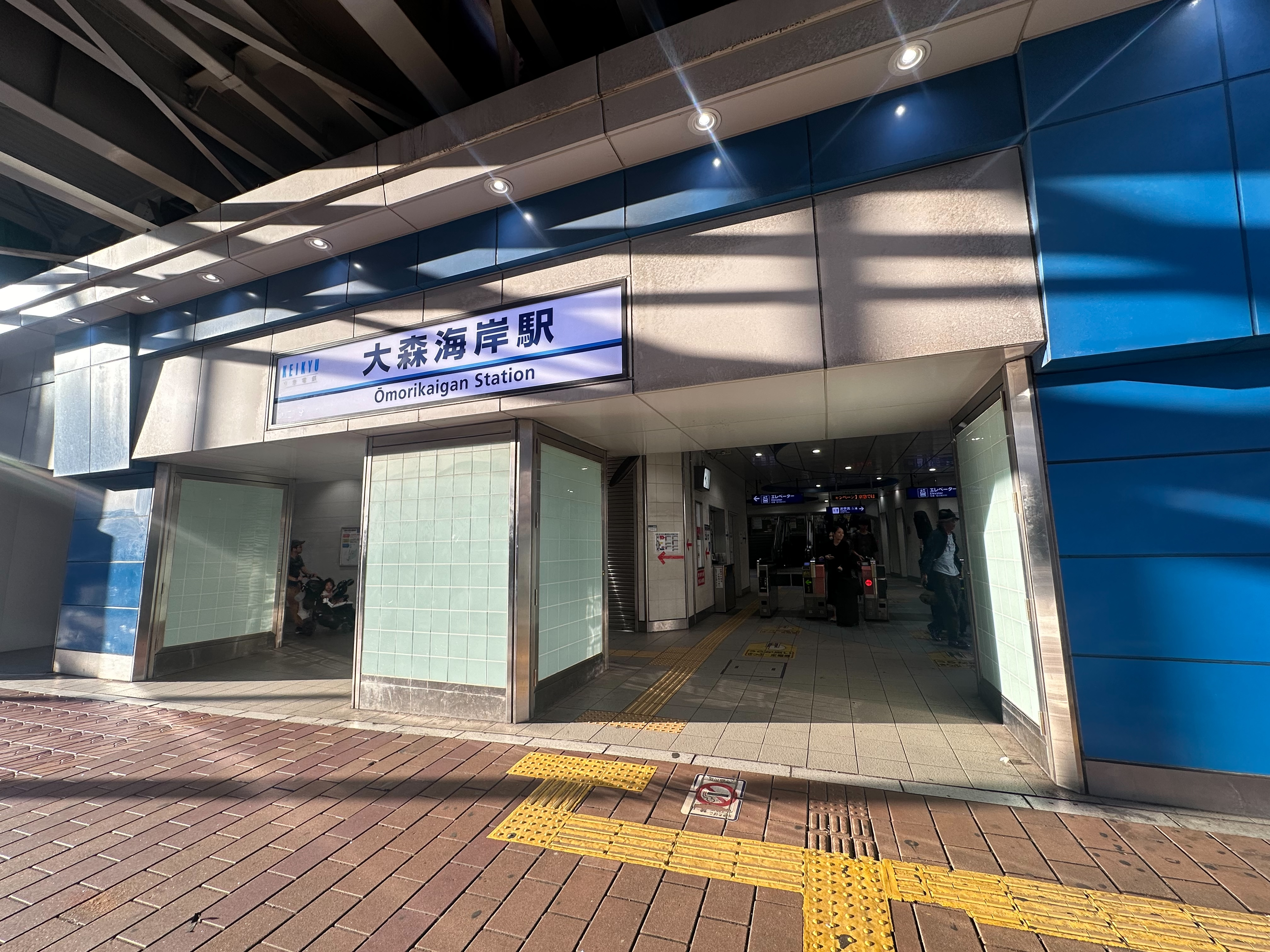
- Ticket gate and exit, 2024

General information
- Location: Minami Ōi 3-32-1, Shinagawa, Tokyo; Japan
- Operator: Keikyu
- Line: Keikyū Main Line
- Platforms: 2 side platforms

Other information
- Station code: KK07

History
- Opened: 1 Feb 1901; 125 years ago
- Former names: Yawata (until 1904); Kaigan (until 1933)

Passengers
- 2021: 11,390 daily

Services
Preceding station	Keikyu	Following station
Heiwajima KK08 towards Uraga	Main Line Local	Tachiaigawa KK06 towards Shinagawa
Location

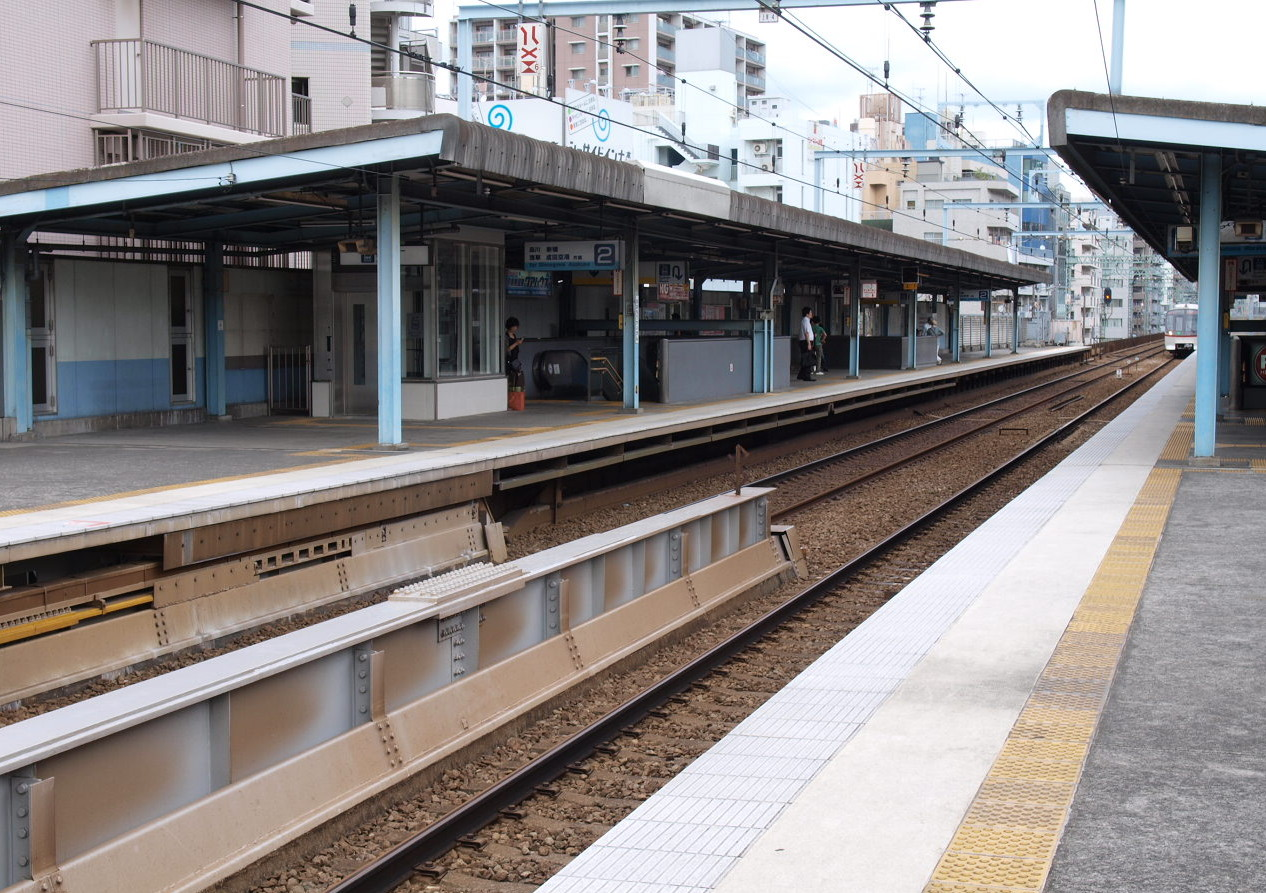
Platforms（8 August 2010）

Ōmorikaigan Station (大森海岸駅, Ōmori-Kaigan-eki) is a Keikyu station on the Keikyū Main Line between Tachiaigawa and Heiwajima. The station is on the borders of Shinagawa and Ōta wards. Its station number is KK07.

== Station layout ==
The station is composed of two side platforms on an overhead railway. Elevators to connect platforms and concourse is set in March 2009. The station name contains "Ōmori", which usually indicates a part of the Ōta ward, but the actual location of much of the station is Shinagawa ward.

=== Platforms ===
1	Keikyū Main Line	for Yokohama, Kanazawa-Hakkei and Uraga; Keikyū Zushi Line for Zushi·Hayama; Keikyū Kurihama Line for Keikyū Kurihama
2	Keikyū Main Line	for Shinagawa

== Passenger statistics ==
In fiscal 2021, an average of 11,390 passengers entered and exited the station daily.

== Nearby the station ==
- Shinagawa-kumin Park
  - Shinagawa Aquarium
- Isuzu hospital
- Minamiōi Library
- Suzugamori execution grounds ruin
- Big Fun Heiwajima
  - Boat Race Heiwajima
- Ito-Yokado Omori store
- Disco Corporation headquarters
- Omori Bell Port
  - Omori Bell Port Post Office

== Transport links ==
Ōmorikaigan Station bus stop is served by Keikyu Bus. Destinations from the bus stop include:

- Haneda Airport
- Jōnanjima
- Keihinjima
- Leisure Land Heiwajima
- Morigasaki
- Ōmori Station
- Ōta Market
- Ōta Stadium
- Ryūtsū Center
- Shōwajima
- Yashio Park Town

Omori Station on the Keihin-Tōhoku Line is located about 10 minutes away on foot.

== History ==
On 1 February 1901, the station was opened as Yawata Station (八幡駅) when the Keihin Electric Railway extension line from Kawasaki to Ōmori Teishajōmae (by Ōmori Station) commenced the service. On 8 May 1904, the main line was extended from this station, concurrently renamed as Kaigan Station (海岸駅), to Shinagawa, making the station a junction of the main line and a branchline to Ōmori Teishajōmae. The branchline was active until 8 March 1937.

The current station name Ōmorikaigan is from 1 July 1933. On 1 December 1970, the work to move the station to the elevated line was completed.

Keikyu introduced station numbering to its stations on 21 October 2010; Ōmorikaigan was assigned station number KK07.
