= Sani =

Sani may refer to:

- Sani (given name), a list of people
- Sani (surname), a list of people
- The Sani ethnic minority, grouped by the Chinese government as part of the Yi people
- Sani, a North American Wild Kratts Girl from the series Wild Kratts

== Places ==
- Sani, Burkina Faso
- Sani, Mauritania
- Sani, Zanskar, a village in Zanskar, Jammu and Kashmir, India
  - Sani Monastery, a Tibetan Buddhist monastery near the village
- Sani Pass, a pass in the Drakensberg linking Lesotho to South Africa

== See also ==
- Shani, in Hindu astrology, Saturn
- Sania (disambiguation), feminine form of the given name
