= Heiwajima Station =

Railway station in Tokyo, Japan

Coordinates: 35.5781°N 139.7347°E

KK08 Heiwajima Station 平和島駅
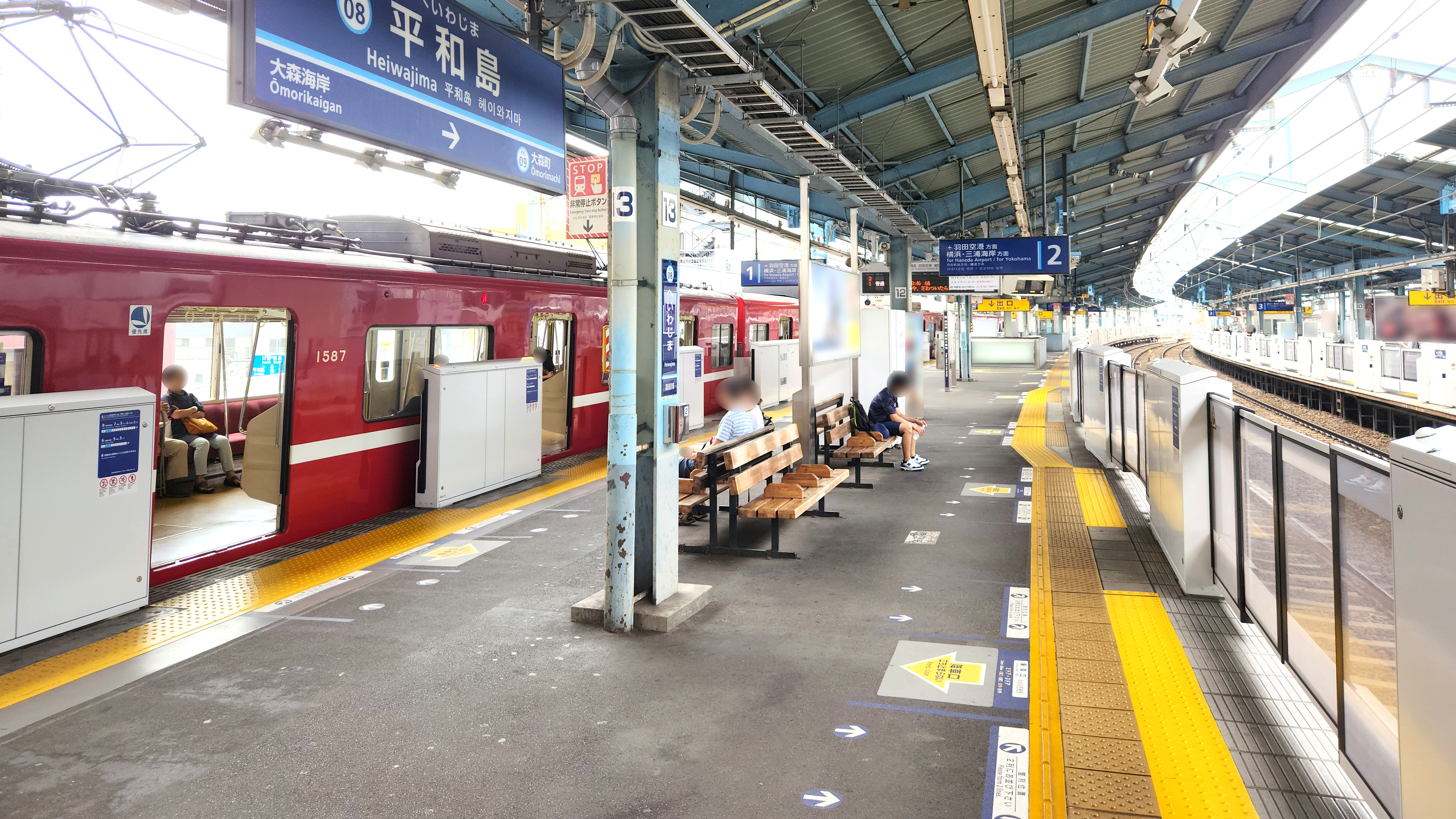
- Station platforms, July 2023

General information
- Location: Ōta, Tokyo; Japan
- Operator: Keihin Electric Express Railway
- Line: Main Line

Construction
- Structure type: Elevated
- Accessible: Yes

History
- Opened: 1 Feb 1901; 125 years ago
- Former names: Sawada; Gakkō-ura (until 1961)

Services
Preceding station	Keikyu	Following station
Keikyū Kamata KK11 towards Uraga	Main Line Limited Express (Tokkyū)	Aomono-yokochō KK04 towards Sengakuji
Keikyū Kamata KK11 Terminus	Main Line Express (rush hours)	Tachiaigawa KK06 towards Sengakuji
Ōmorimachi KK09 towards Uraga	Main Line Local	Ōmorikaigan KK07 towards Shinagawa
Location

Heiwajima Station (Japanese: 平和島駅, romanized: Heiwajima-eki, [heːwaʑimaꜜ eki]) is a railway station of the Keihin Electric Express Railway located in Ōta, Tokyo, Japan.

== Lines ==
- Keikyū Main Line

== Station layout ==
The station has two island platforms serving four tracks. Both platforms are on the upper level and connected by stairs, escalators and elevators to the ground level where ticket office, gates and toilets are located.

=== Platforms ===
1-2	Keikyū Main Line	for Yokohama and Uraga; Keikyū Airport Line for Haneda Airport Terminal 1·2; Keikyū Zushi Line for Zushi·Hayama; Keikyū Kurihama Line for Miurakaigan and Misakiguchi
3-4	Keikyū Main Line	for Shinagawa and Sengakuji; Toei Asakusa Line for Shimbashi and Oshiage; Keisei Oshiage Line for Aoto; Keisei Main Line for Keisei-Narita and Narita Airport; Hokusō Line for Imba Nihon-idai; Narita Sky Access Line for Narita Airport

== History ==
The station opened on February 1, 1901 as Sawada Station (沢田駅). Later the name was changed to Gakkō-ura Station (学校裏駅), meaning "behind the school". The present name Heiwajima was given 1 September 1961. The platforms were moved to the elevated tracks in 1970.

Keikyu introduced station numbering to its stations on 21 October 2010; Heiwajima was assigned station number KK08.

== Around the station ==
To the east of the station is Heiwanomori-Kōen (平和の森公園) park.
