= Saina =

Saina may refer to:

== People ==
- Saina (singer) (born 1971), Yakut singer
- Betsy Saina (born 1988), Kenyan long-distance runner
- Saina Nehwal (born 1990), Indian badminton player

== Other uses ==
- Saina (film), a 2021 biographical film about Saina Nehwal
- Saipa Saina, an Iranian car model

== See also ==
- Sania (disambiguation)
- Siana (given name)
