= Sania (disambiguation) =

Sania may refer to:

- Sania, a popular female name
- A clan of the Bharwad people of India

== See also ==
- Sani (disambiguation), the masculine form of the given name
- Saina (disambiguation)
- Sanya (disambiguation)
- Sonia (disambiguation)
