= Umeyashiki Station =

Umeyashiki Station (梅屋敷駅) is the name of two train stations in Japan:

- Umeyashiki Station (Nara)
- Umeyashiki Station (Tokyo)
