= Tachiaigawa Station =

Railway station in Tokyo, Japan

Coordinates: 35.5983°N 139.7388°E

KK06 Tachiaigawa Station 立会川駅
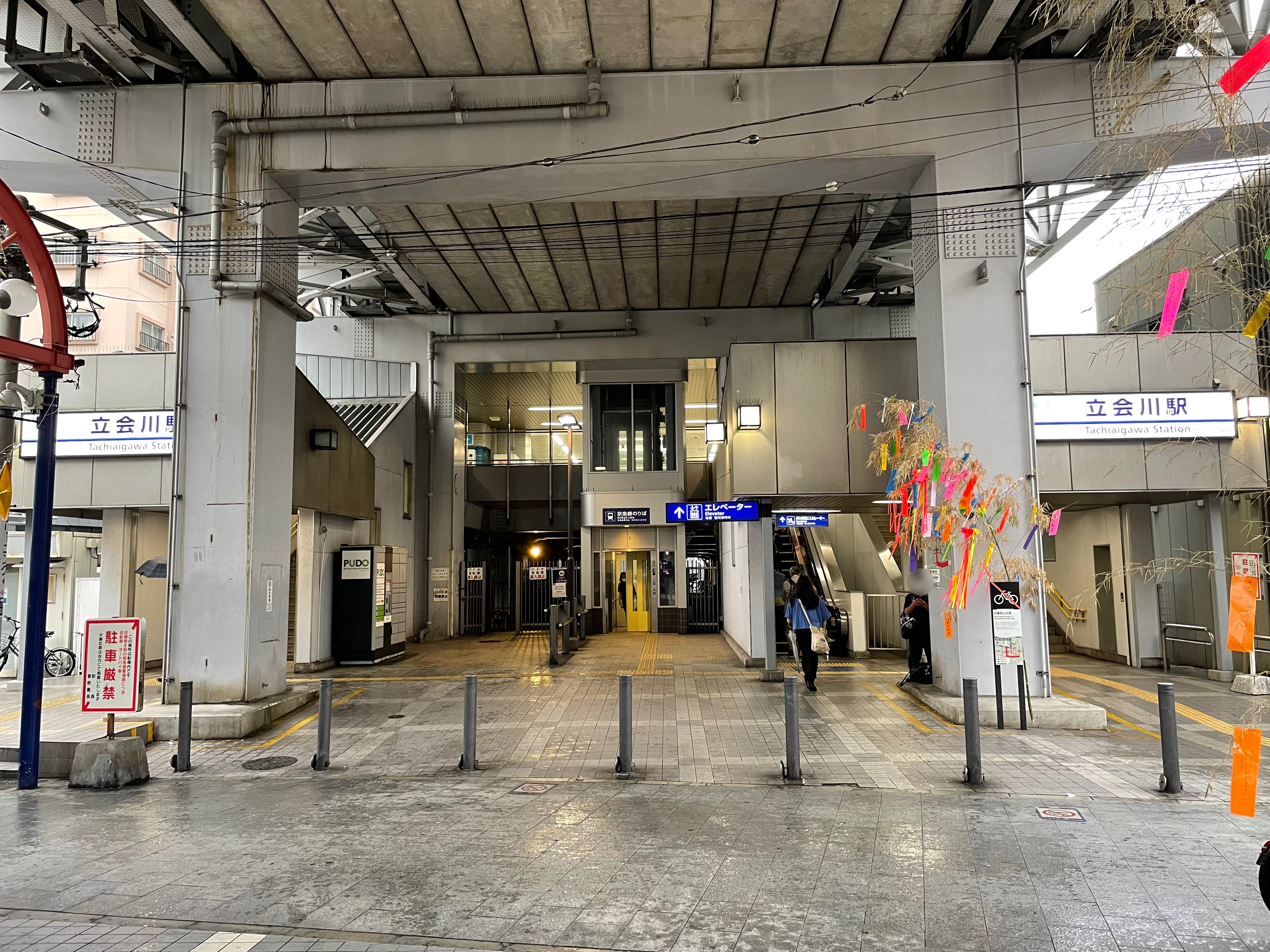
- Entrance to the station in July 2022

General information
- Location: Shinagawa, Tokyo; Japan
- Operator: Keikyu
- Line: Keikyū Main Line

History
- Opened: 8 May 1904; 122 years ago

Services
Preceding station	Keikyu	Following station
Heiwajima KK08 towards Keikyū Kamata	Main Line Express (rush hours)	Aomono-yokochō KK04 towards Sengakuji
Ōmorikaigan KK07 towards Uraga	Main Line Local	Samezu KK05 towards Shinagawa
Location

Tachiaigawa Station (立会川駅, Tachiaigawa-eki) is a train station in Shinagawa, Tokyo, Japan.

== Lines ==
- Keikyu
  - Main Line

== Layout ==
This elevated station consists of two side platforms serving two tracks.

1	Keikyū Main Line	for Keikyū Kamata, Yokohama, and Uraga; Keikyū Airport Line for Haneda Airport Terminal 1·2; Keikyū Zushi Line for Zushi·Hayama; Keikyū Kurihama Line for Miurakaigan and Misakiguchi
2	Keikyū Main Line	for Shinagawa and Sengakuji; Toei Asakusa Line for Shimbashi and Oshiage; Keisei Oshiage Line for Aoto; Keisei Main Line for Keisei-Narita and Narita Airport; Hokusō Line for Imba Nihon-idai; Narita Sky Access Line for Narita Airport

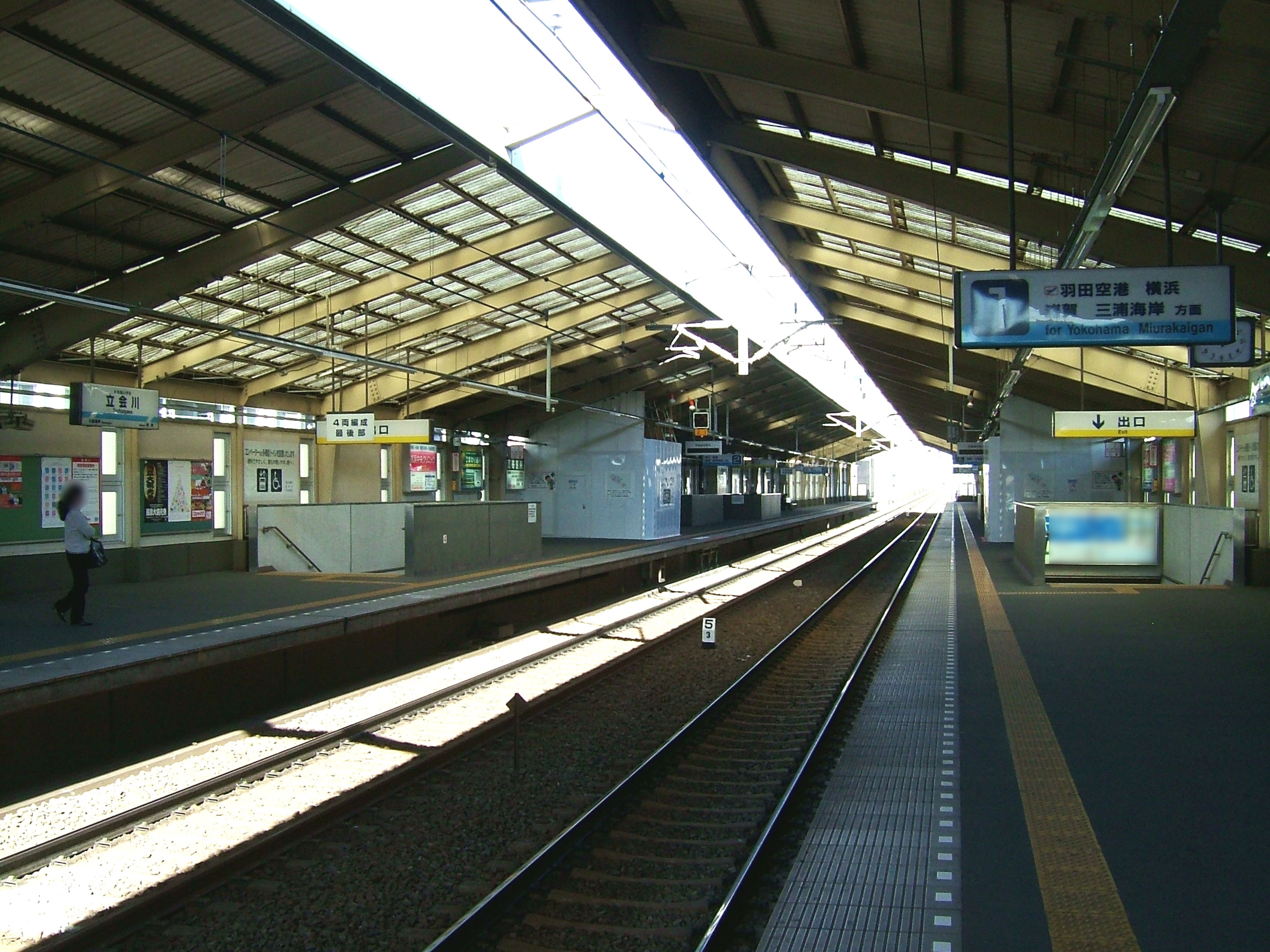
Station platforms in November, 2008

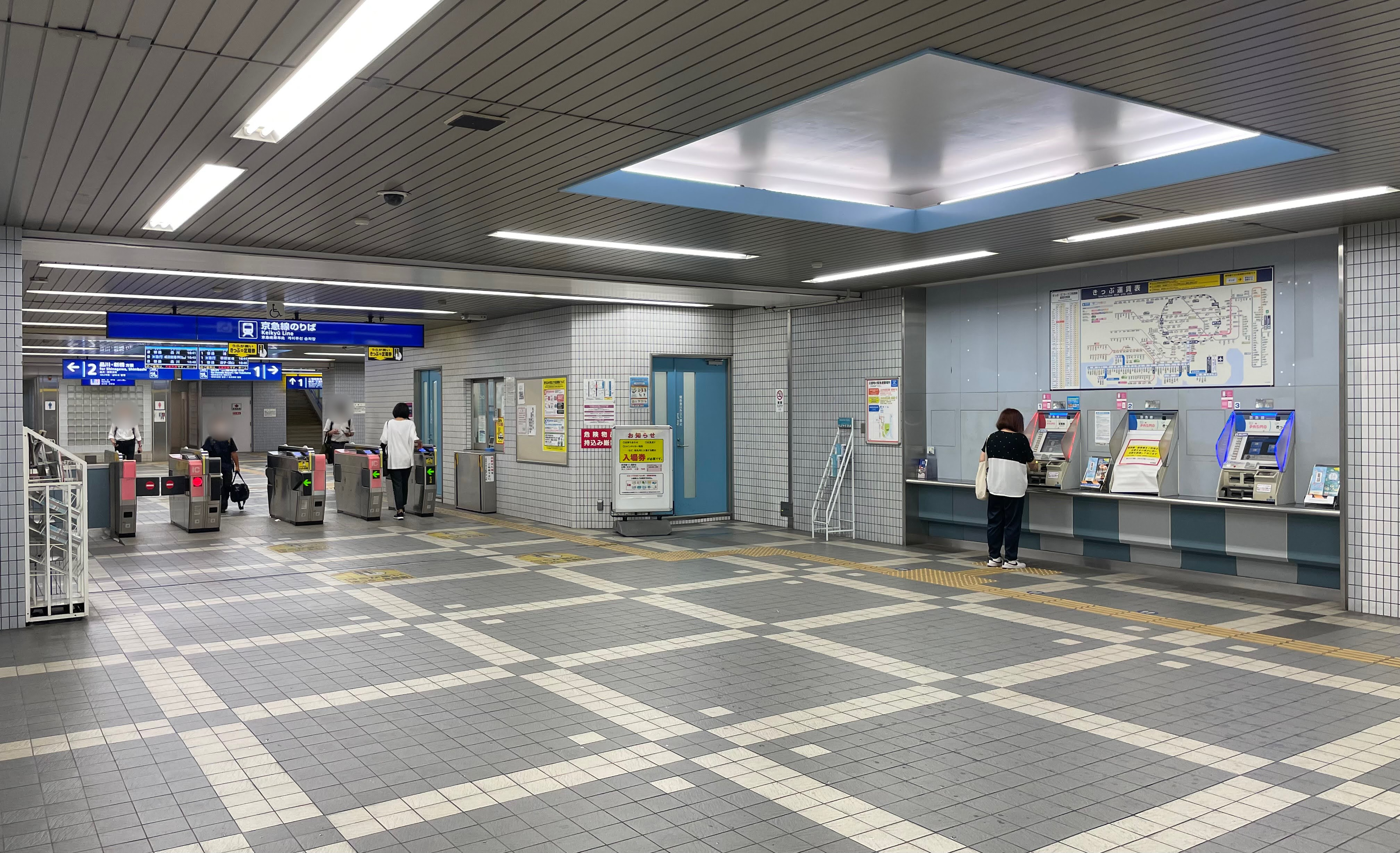
Ticket gates in July, 2022

== History ==
The station opened on 8 May 1904. The platforms were moved from the ground level to the elevated line in June 1989 (Shinagawa-bound platform) and February 1990 (Uraga-bound platform). The station building was completed in March 1991.

Keikyu introduced station numbering to its stations on 21 October 2010; Tachiaigawa was assigned station number KK06.
