= Umeyashiki Station (Tokyo) =

Railway station in Tokyo, Japan

Coordinates: 35.5670°N 139.7284°E

KK10 Umeyashiki Station 梅屋敷駅
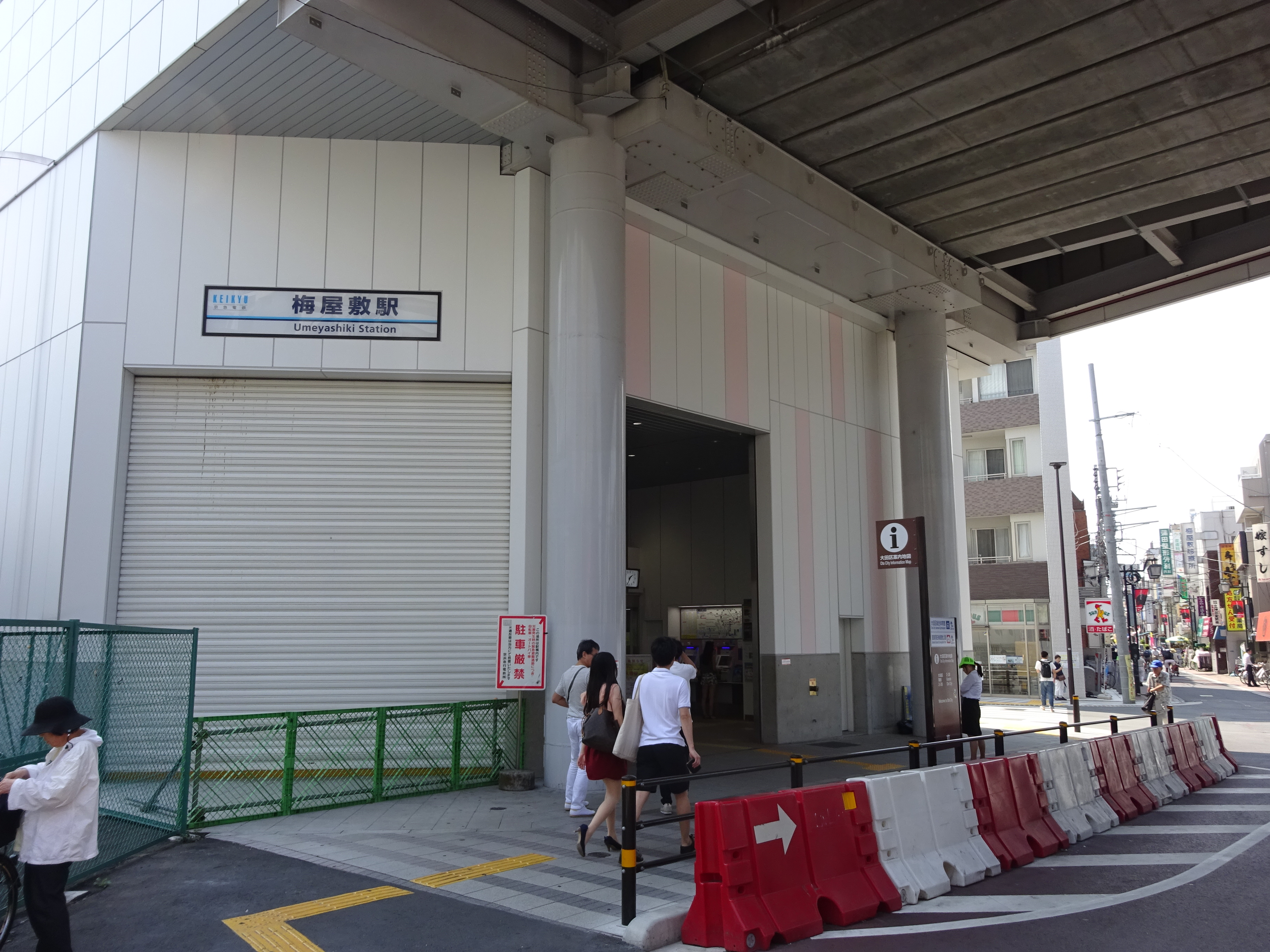
- The station entrance in August 2016

General information
- Location: 2-28-1 Kamata, Ota-ku, Tokyo; Japan
- Operator: Keikyu Corporation
- Line: Keikyu Main Line
- Distance: 8.4 km from Sengakuji
- Platforms: 2 side platforms
- Tracks: 2

Other information
- Station code: KK10
- Website: Official website

History
- Opened: 1 February 1901; 125 years ago
- Rebuilt: 2012

Passengers
- FY2011: 13,542 daily

Services
Preceding station	Keikyu	Following station
Keikyū Kamata KK11 towards Uraga	Main Line Local	Ōmorimachi KK09 towards Shinagawa
Location
- Location within Tokyo

Umeyashiki Station (梅屋敷駅, Umeyashiki-eki) is a railway station on the Keikyu Main Line in Ōta, Tokyo, Japan, operated by the private railway operator Keikyu. It is numbered "KK10".

== Lines ==
Umeyashiki Station is served by the Keikyu Main Line, and lies 8.4 km from the starting point of the line at Sengakuji.

== Layout ==
The station has two elevated side platforms serving two tracks. Before the station was rebuilt, the station was long enough to only handle 4-car trains.

=== Platforms ===
1	Keikyū Main Line	for Yokohama, Kanazawa-Hakkei and Uraga; Keikyū Zushi Line for Zushi·Hayama
2	Keikyū Main Line	for Shinagawa

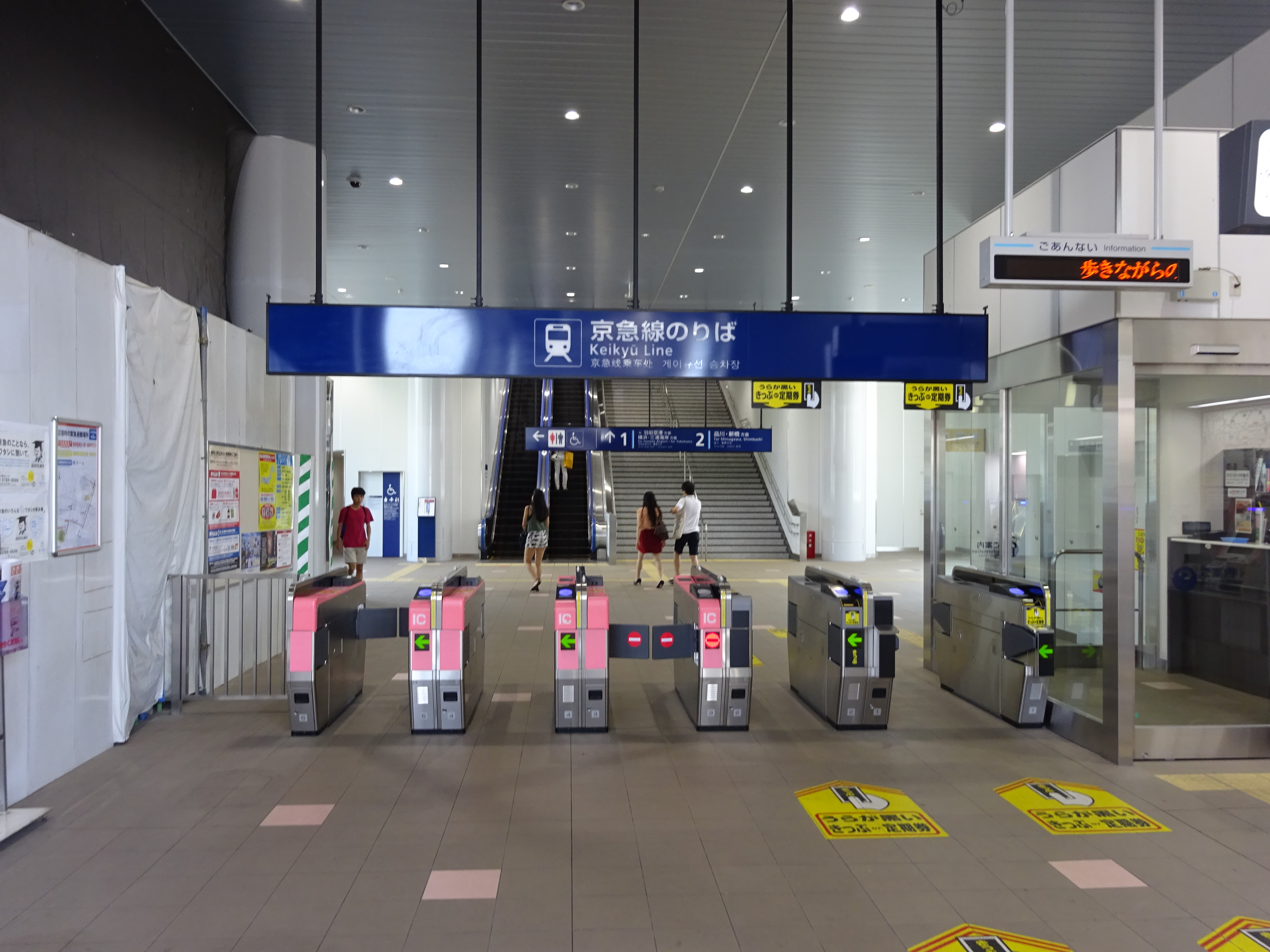
The ticket barriers in August 2016

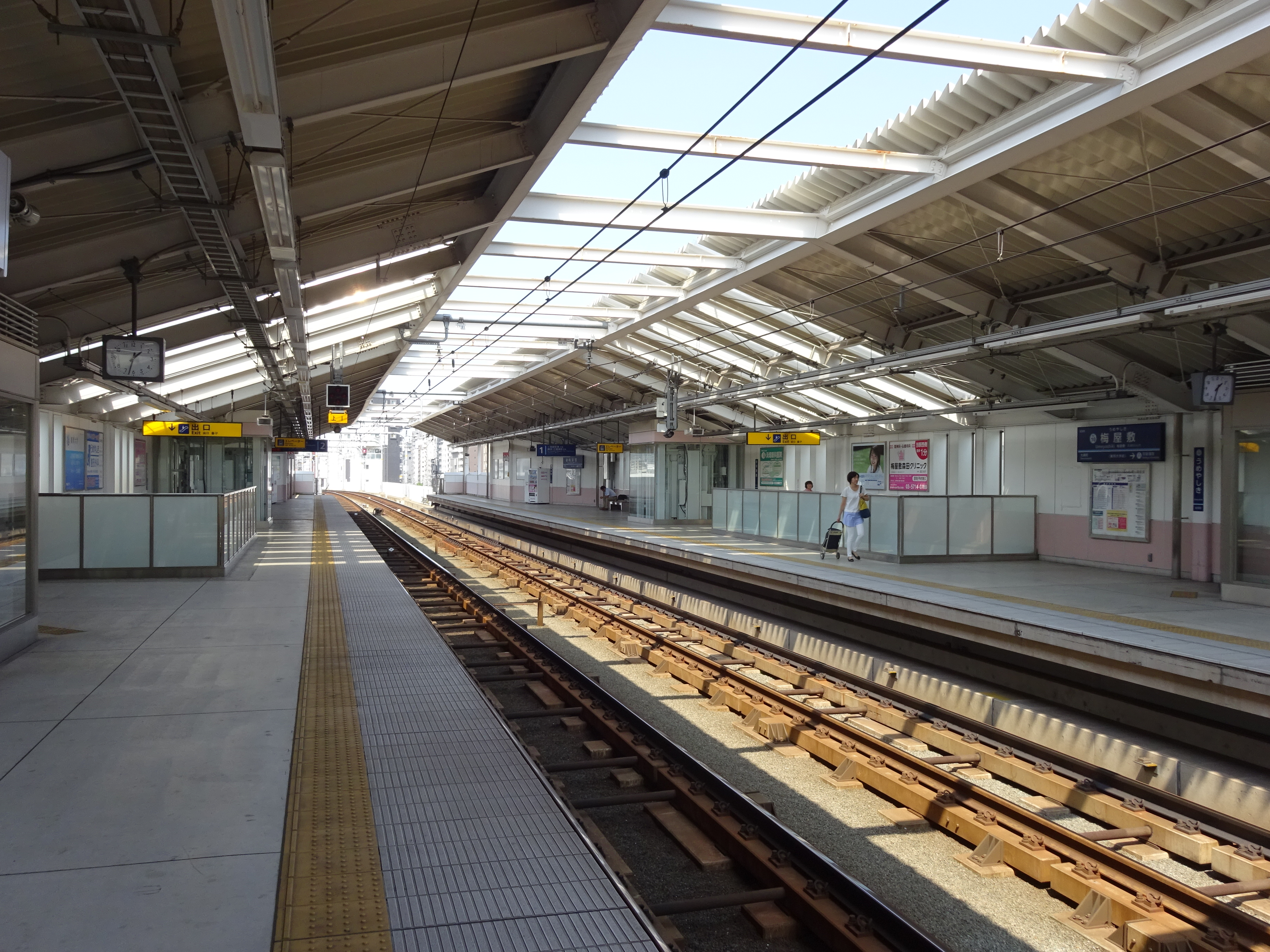
The platforms in August 2016

== History ==
The station opened on 1 February 1901.

Keikyu introduced station numbering to its stations on 21 October 2010; Umeyashiki was assigned station number KK10.

The station was rebuilt with elevated tracks, completed in October 2012.

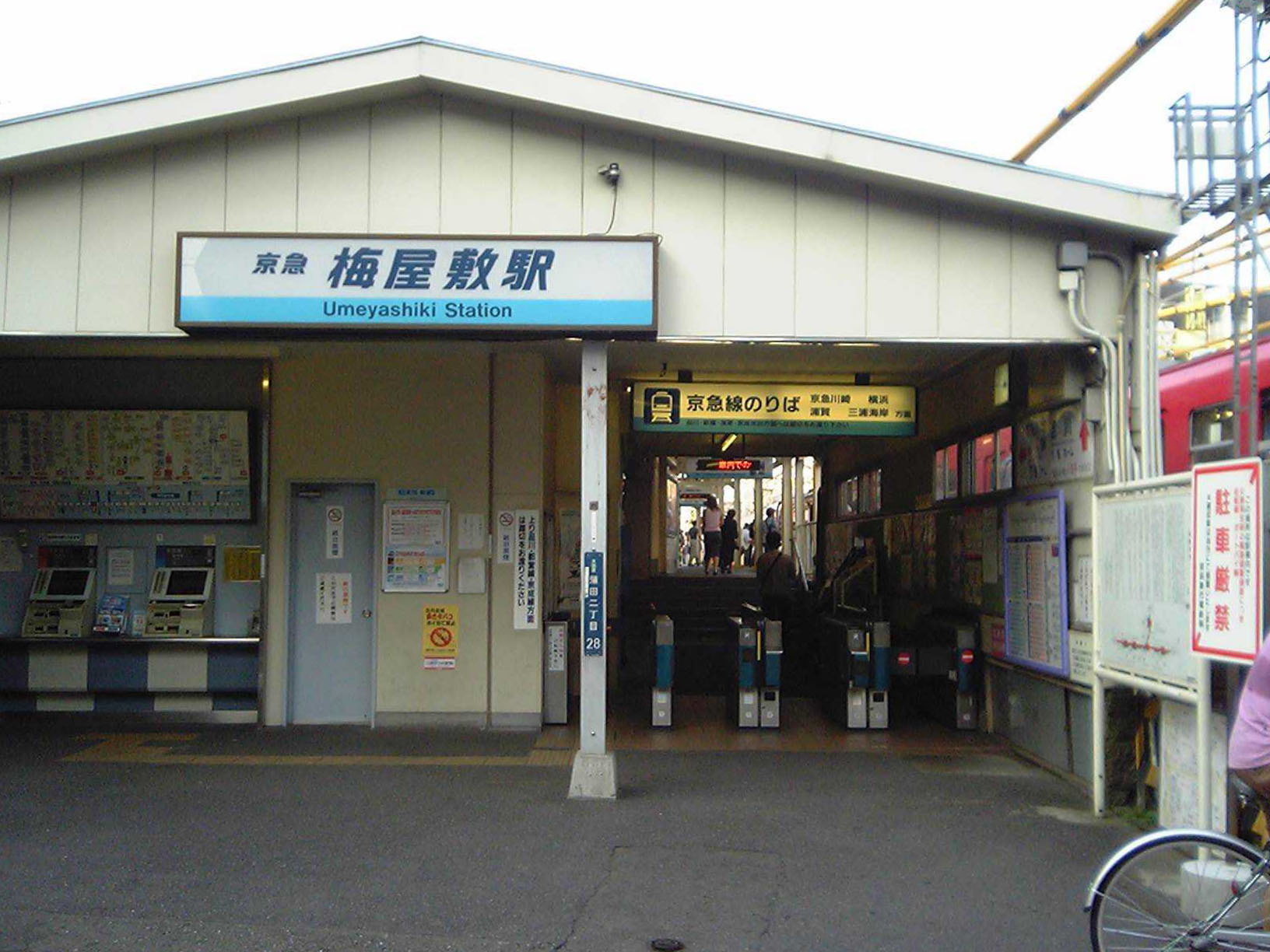
The station entrance in September 2005 before rebuilding

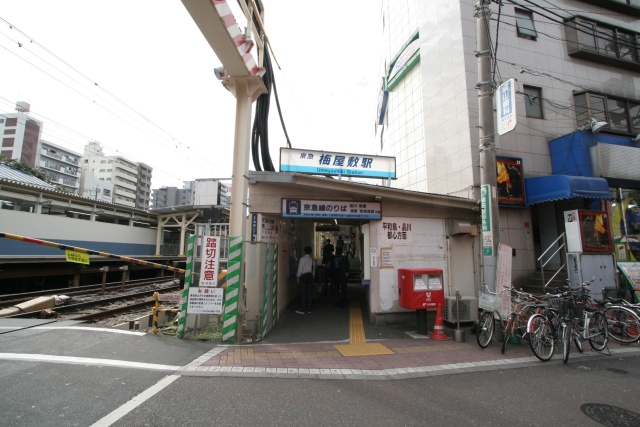
The west entrance in October 2007 before rebuilding

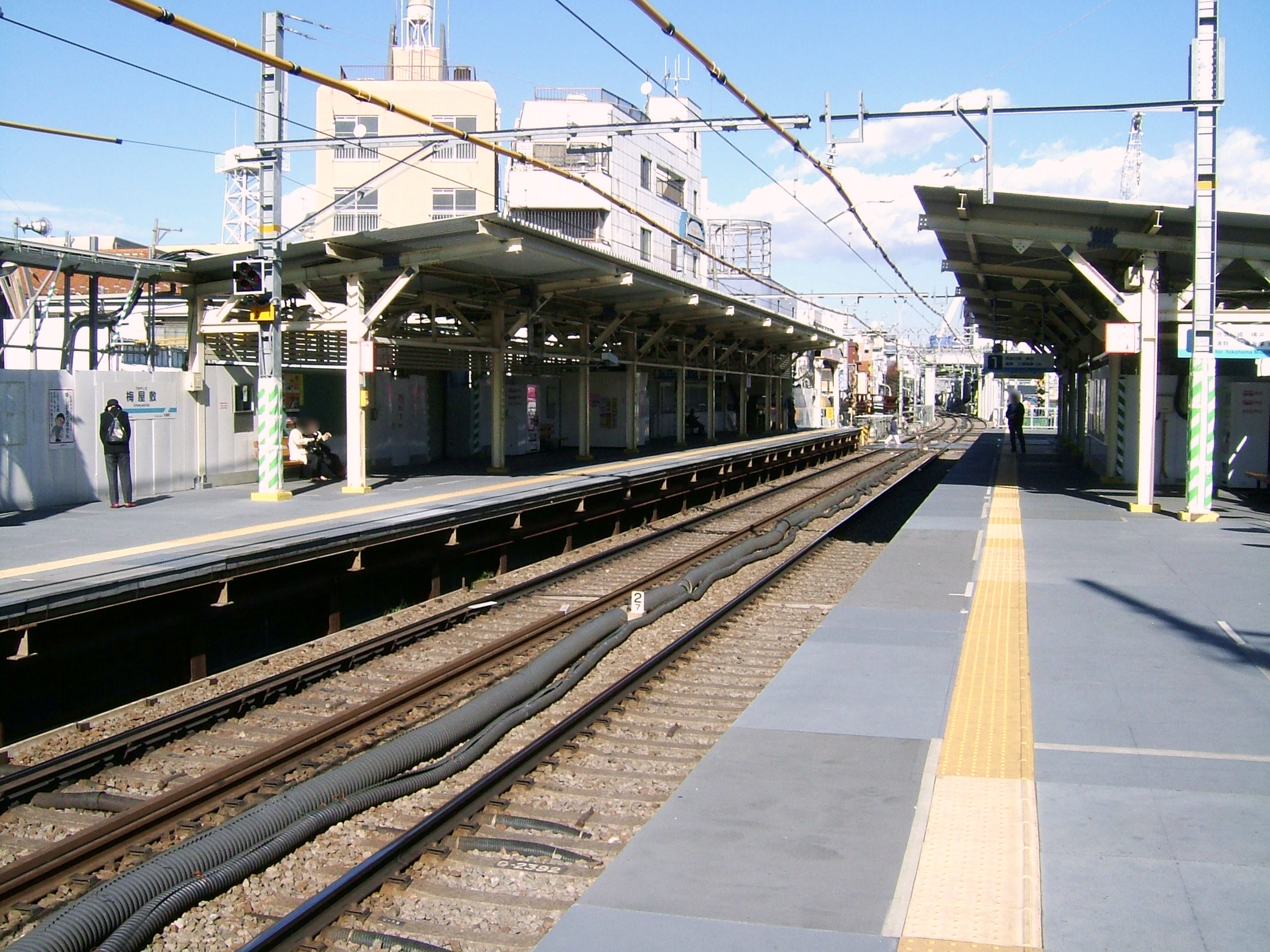
The ground-level platforms in November 2008 before rebuilding

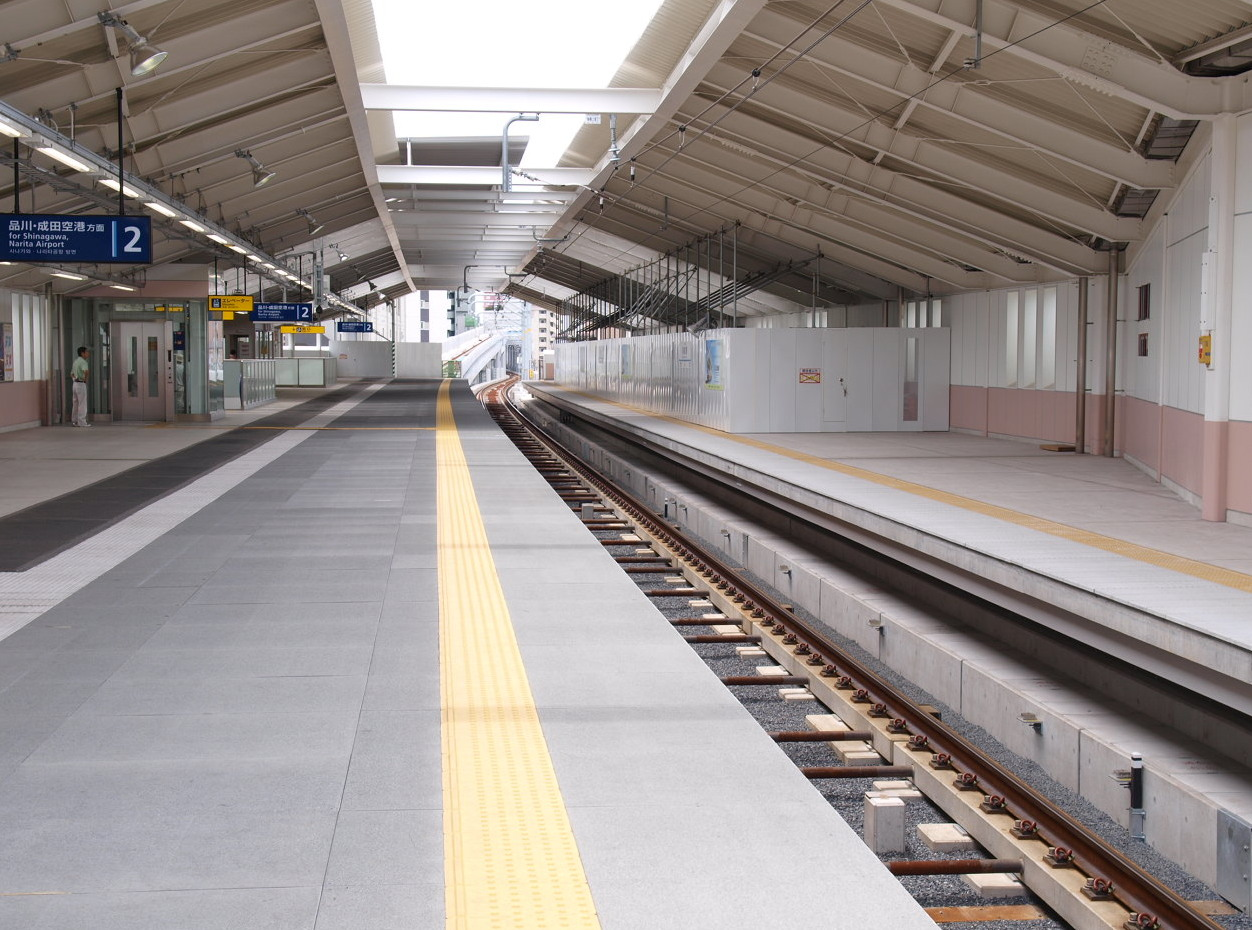
The elevated platforms under construction in August 2010

== Passenger statistics ==
In fiscal 2011, the station was used by an average of 13,542 passengers daily.

== Surrounding area ==
- Umeyashiki Park
- Toho University Omori Campus
- Tokyo Biotechnology College
- Ota City General Gymnasium

== See also ==
- List of railway stations in Japan
