= Ōmori Station (Tokyo) =

Railway station in Tokyo, Japan

Coordinates: 35°35′18″N 139°43′41″E

JK18 Ōmori Station 大森駅
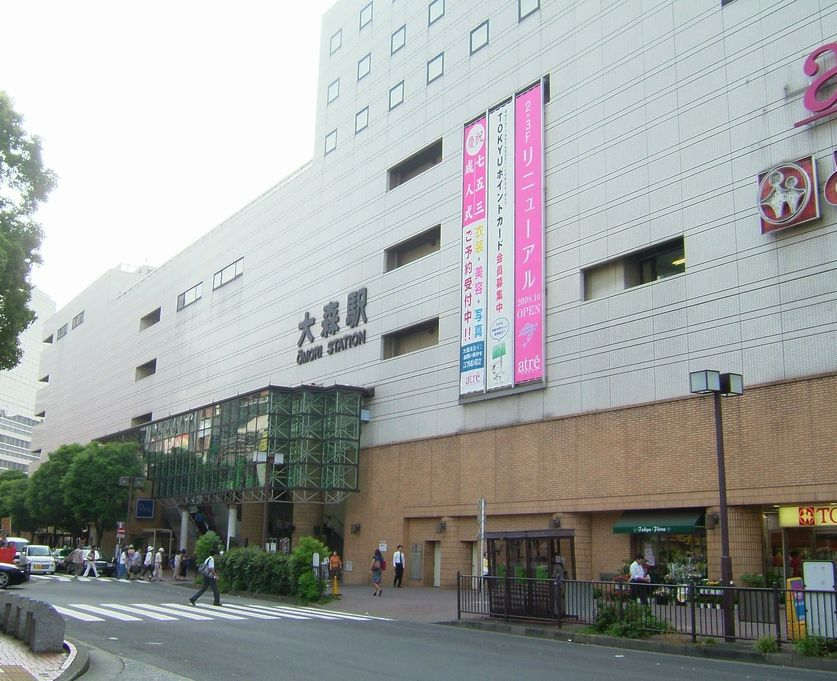
- Station building

General information
- Location: Ōta, Tokyo; Japan
- Operator: JR East
- Line: Keihin-Tōhoku Line

History
- Opened: 1876

Passengers
- FY2013: 92,962 daily

Services
Preceding station	JR East	Following station
Kamata JK17 towards Yokohama	Keihin–Tōhoku Line Rapid Local	Ōimachi JK19 towards Ōmiya
Location

Ōmori Station (大森駅, Ōmori-eki) is a train station operated by East Japan Railway Company (JR East) located in Ōta, Tokyo, Japan. It has the station number "JK18".

== History ==
The station opened on June 12, 1876.

== Station layout ==
1	Keihin-Tōhoku Line	for Kamata, Kawasaki, and Yokohama; Negishi Line for Ōfuna
2	Keihin-Tōhoku Line	for Shinagawa, Tokyo, Ueno, and Ōmiya

== Passenger statistics ==
In fiscal 2013, the station was used by an average of 92,962 passengers daily (boarding passengers only), making it the 43rd-busiest station operated by JR East. The daily passenger figures (boarding passengers only) in previous years are as shown below.

Fiscal year	Daily average
2000	90,159
2005	88,049
2010	91,601
2011	90,946
2012	91,774
2013	92,962

== See also ==
Media related to Ōmori Station (Tokyo) at Wikimedia Commons
