= Sanja =

Sanja is a South Slavic feminine given name, meaning "she dreams".

== Notable persons with this name ==
- Sanja Ančić (born 1988), Croatian tennis player
- Sanja Bestic (born 1982), Serbian-American director, writer and producer
- Sanja Bizjak (born 1988), Serbian pianist
- Sanja Bogosavljević (born 1979), Serbian singer
- Sanja Damjanović (born 1972), Montenegrin physicist and minister of science
- Sanja Doležal (born 1963), Croatian singer and television host
- Sanja Đorđević (born 1969), Montenegrin turbo-folk singer
- Sanja Gavrilović (born 1982), Croatian hammer thrower
- Sanja Grohar (born 1984), Slovenian model and singer
- Sanja Ilić (1951–2021), Serbian composer, keyboardist and architect
- Sanja Iveković (born 1949), Croatian photographer, sculptor and installation artist
- Sanja Jovanović (born 1986), Croatian swimmer
- Sanja Knežević (born 1984), Montenegrin basketball player
- Sanja Malagurski (born 1990), Serbian volleyball player
- Sanja Maletić (born 1973), Bosnian pop-folk singer
- Sanja Mandić (born 1995), Serbian basketball player
- Sanja Matejaš or Sanya Mateyas, Croatian–American actress and singer
- Sanja Nikčević (born 1960), Croatian theatre critic and professor of theatre history
- Sanja Orozović (born 1990), Serbian basketball player
- Sanja Ožegović (born 1959), Yugoslav basketball player
- Sanja Papić (born 1984), Serbian model and beauty pageant contestant
- Sanja Popović (born 1984), Croatian volleyball player
- Sanja Premović (born 1992), Montenegrin handball player
- Sanja Radosavljević (born 1994), Serbian handball player
- Sanja Rajović (born 1981), Serbian handball player
- Sanja Starović (born 1983), Serbian volleyball player
- Sanja Štiglic (born 1970), Slovenian civil servant, diplomat and politician
- Sanja Stijačić (born 1965), Serbian flautist and professor
- Sanja Vejnović (born 1961), Croatian actress
- Sanja Vučić (born 1993), Serbian singer
- Sanja Vujović (born 1987), Serbian handball player

== See also ==
- Sanja (disambiguation)
- Sanya (name)
- Sania (name)
- Shania (given name)
