= Sania =

- Pronunciation: sah•nee•yAAh
- Gender: Female
- Language: Persian; Urdu

Origin
- Meaning: "brilliant" "radiant" "splendid"
- Region of origin: Persian; Pakistan; Afghanistan

Other names
- Alternative spelling: Saniya
- Derived: Persian
- Popularity: see popular names

Sania (Urdu: ثانیہ, Persian : ثانیہ) is an Urdu Persian feminine given name, which means "second cardinal number" and "splendid". It comes from the Arabic cardinal number for second in feminine form ثانية and it means second for feminine objects.

== Notable people named Sania ==
- Sania Ashiq (born 1993), Pakistani politician
- Sania Feagin (born 2003), American basketball player
- Sania Khan (born 1985), Pakistani cricketer
- Sania Sultana Liza, Bangladeshi singer
- Sania Maskatiya, Pakistani fashion designer
- Sania Mirza (born 1986), Indian tennis player
- Sania Nishtar (born 1963), Pakistani academic, cardiologist and writer
- Sania Saeed (born 1975), Pakistani actress and TV announcer
- Sania Saleh (1935–1985), Syrian poet

== Notable people named Saniya ==
- Saniya Anklesaria (born 2001), Indian actress

== See also ==
- Sania Ramel Airport, Morocco
- Sanja
- Sanya (name)
- Shania (given name)
- Sanaia
