= Shania (given name) =

- Pronunciation: shan-EYE-ah
- Gender: female

Origin
- Origin: An invented name perhaps based on Ojibwe "Ani aya’aa", "someone on the way"
- Region of origin: English-speaking countries

Other names
- Related names: Shanya, Shaniya, Nya, Ny-Ny, Niya, Ni-Ni, Shaniyniy

Shania is a feminine given name, popularized by country and pop singer Shania Twain. It is pronounced with the stress on the i, as in Mariah. Twain, born Eilleen Regina Edwards, adopted the surname of her stepfather, Gerald "Jerry" Twain, an Ojibwe, and later changed her given name to "Shania" in his honour.

Several sources contend that the name is of Ojibwe origin meaning "I'm on my way", or "she is on her way". However, Twain's biographer, Robin Eggar, writes: "There is a continuing confusion about what 'Shania' means and if indeed it is an Ojibwe word or phrase at all. [...] There is no mispronounced or misheard phrase in either Ojibwe or Cree that comes close to meaning 'on my way.' Yet the legend of her name continues to be repeated in the media to this day."

Robin Eggar was incorrect about there being no Ojibwe phrase with a similar meaning which sounds like Shania. "Ani aya'aa", pronounced "Ah-nih Eye-uh-ah", means "someone on the way" in Ojibwe. It is therefore possible that someone with an imperfect knowledge of the Ojibwe language created Shania with the incorrect idea it would mean "she's on the way".

According to the English onomastician Patrick Hanks, the name is a recent elaboration of the given name Shana.

Persons with this given name include:

- Shania Collins (born 1996), African-American athlete
- Shania Geiss (born 2004), German influencer
- Shania Gracia, Indonesian singer and a member of the Indonesian idol group JKT48
- Shania Hayles (born 1999), Jamaican footballer
- Shania Junianatha, Indonesian singer and former member of JKT48
- Shania Robba (born 2001), Gibraltarian footballer
- Shania Twain (born 1965), Canadian singer-songwriter

== See also ==
- Sania
- Sanja
- Sanya (name)
