= Aomono-yokochō Station =

Railway station in Tokyo, Japan

KK04 Aomono-yokochō Station 青物横丁駅
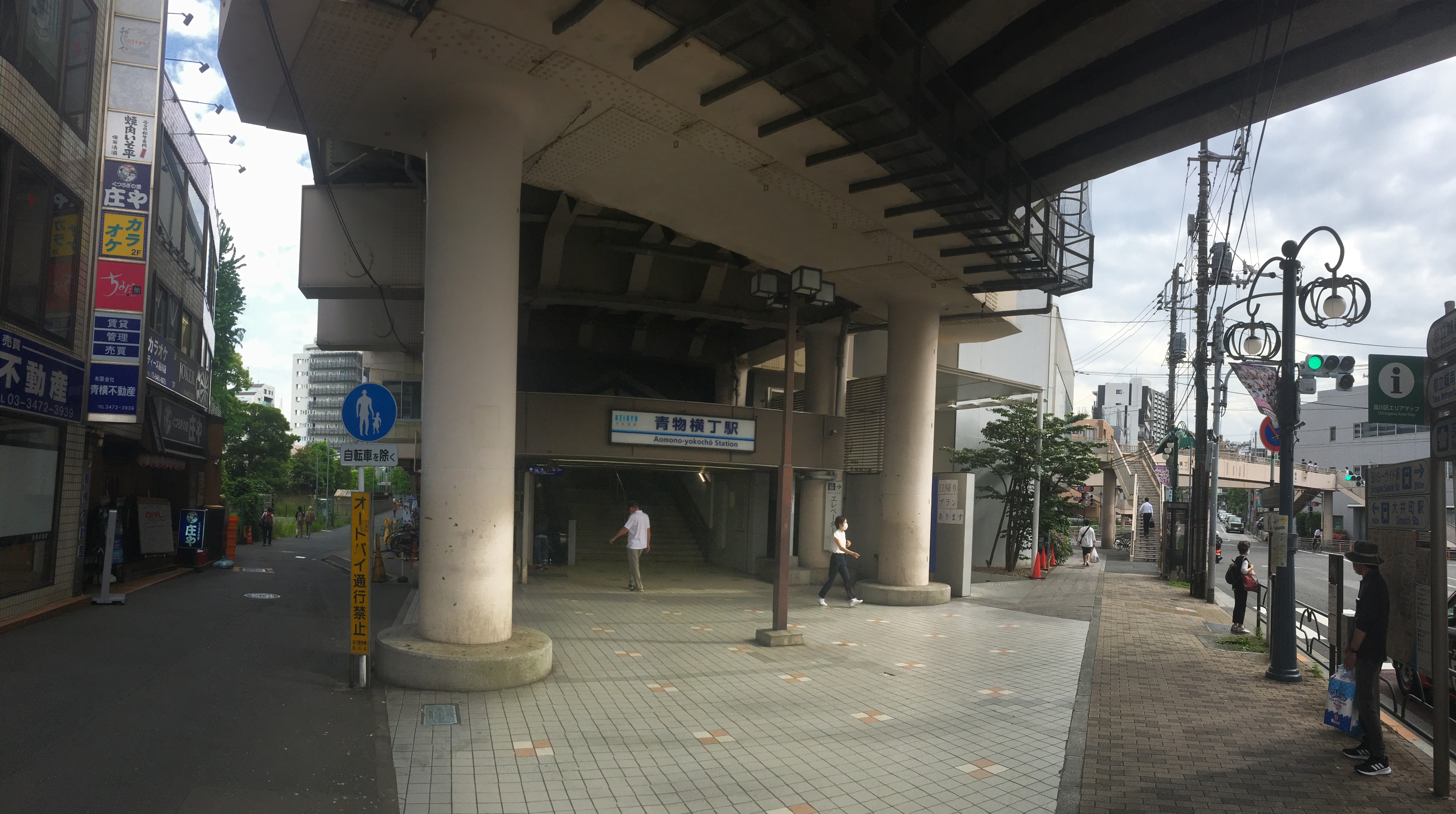
- Aomono-yokochō Station entrance in May 2022

General information
- Location: Shinagawa, Tokyo; Japan
- Coordinates: 35°36′33.5″N 139°44′34.5″E
- Operator: Keikyū
- Line: Keikyū Main Line

Other information
- Website: Official website

History
- Opened: 8 May 1904; 122 years ago

Services
Preceding station	Keikyu	Following station
Heiwajima KK08 towards Uraga	Main Line Limited Express (Tokkyū)	Shinagawa KK01 towards Sengakuji
Tachiaigawa KK06 towards Keikyū Kamata	Main Line Express (rush hours)	Shinagawa KK01 towards Sengakuji
Samezu KK05 towards Uraga	Main Line Local	Shimbamba KK03 towards Shinagawa
Location

Aomono-yokochō Station (青物横丁駅, Aomono-yokochō-eki) is a railway station in Shinagawa, Tokyo, Japan, operated by the private railway operator Keikyu Corporation.

== Lines ==
- Keikyu
  - Main Line

== Layout ==
Aomono-yokochō Station is an elevated station with two side platforms serving two tracks. The station is barrier-free and is equipped with an escalator and an elevator outside the gate and the entrance to the concourse as well as a multi-functional toilet in the concourse inside the ticket gates.

=== Platforms ===
1	Keikyū Main Line	for Keikyū Kamata, Yokohama, and Uraga; Keikyū Airport Line for Haneda Airport Terminal 1·2; Keikyū Zushi Line for Zushi·Hayama; Keikyū Kurihama Line for Miurakaigan and Misakiguchi
2	Keikyū Main Line	for Shinagawa and Sengakuji; Toei Asakusa Line for Shimbashi and Oshiage; Keisei Oshiage Line for Aoto; Keisei Main Line for Keisei-Narita and Narita Airport; Hokusō Line for Imba Nihon-idai; Narita Sky Access Line for Narita Airport

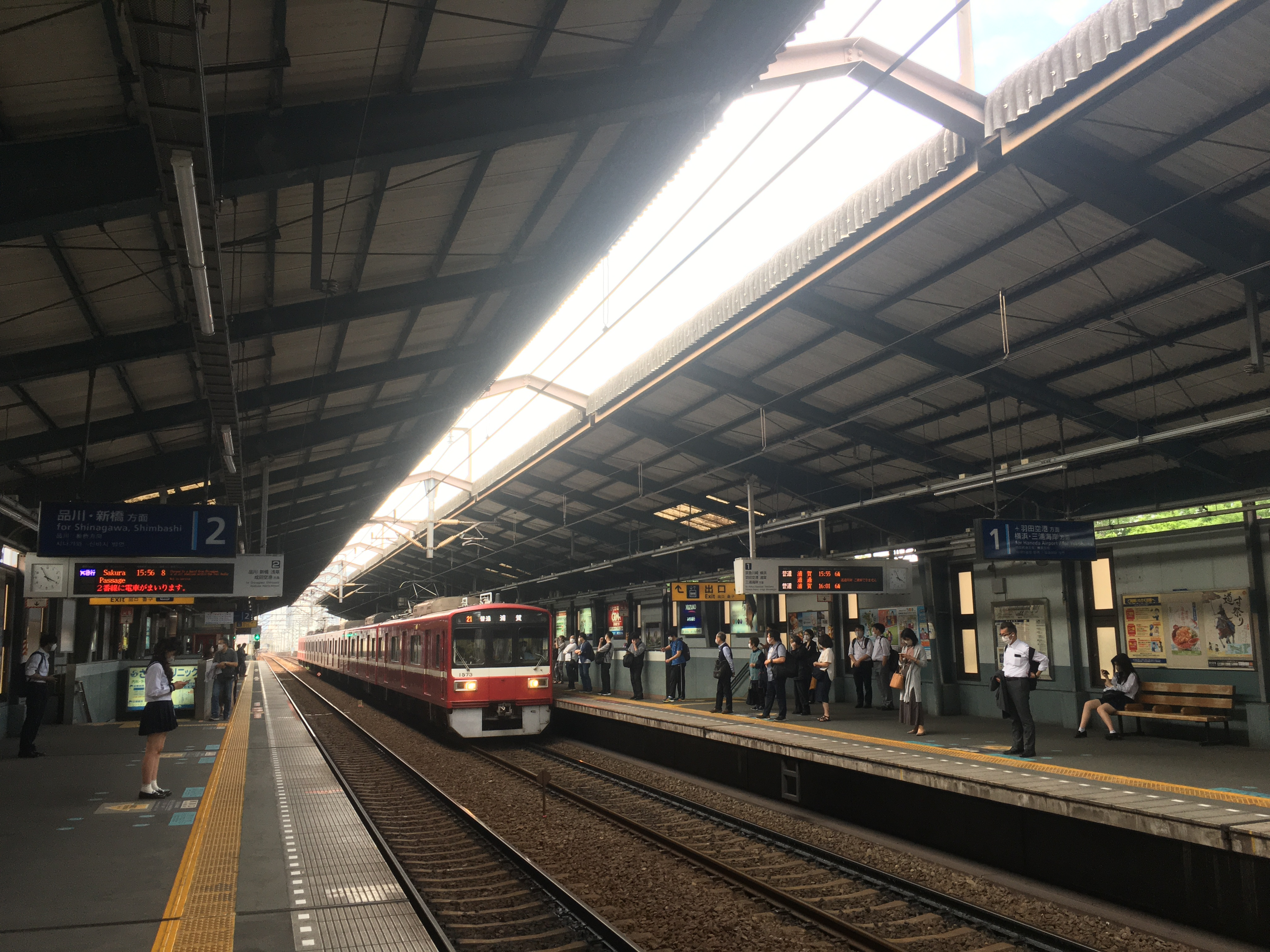
Station platforms in May 2022

== History ==
The station opened on May 8, 1904. It became an Express stop station with the start of direct operation with Toei Subway Asakusa Line on June 21, 1968. The northbound line was elevated on June 25, 1989, with the remaining southbound line being elevated on December 2, 1990. Usage of a new elevated station building started on December 16, 1991. Lengthening of the station to accommodate 12-car trains was finished on October 4, 1997. A station melody was introduced on December 14, 2008. With the implementation of the revised timetable and the renaming of Express services to Airport Express, the station became a stop on May 16, 2010. Keikyu introduced station numbering to its stations on 21 October, 2010; Aomono-yokochō was assigned station number KK04.

=== Origin of the name ===
The name "Aomono Yokochō" originates in the Edo period, when farmers brought fruits to markets in this area. It is the only train station in Japan with "Yokochō" in its name.
