= Samezu Station =

Railway station in Tokyo, Japan

KK05 Samezu Station 鮫洲駅
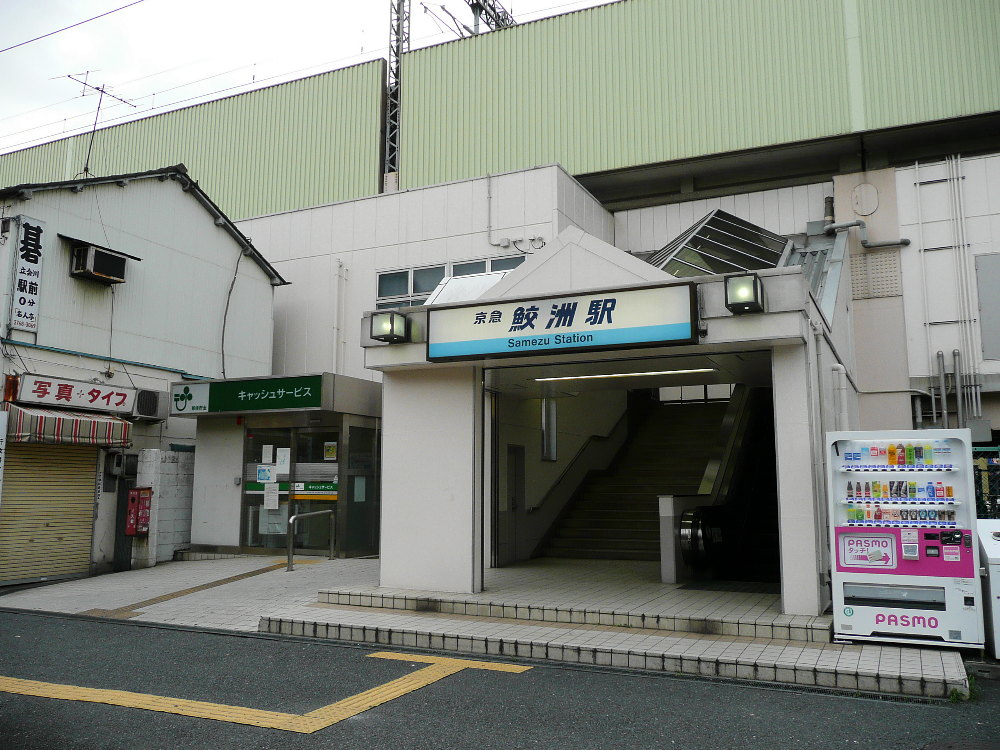
- Samezu Station east entrance in July 2007

General information
- Location: 1-2-20 Higashi-oi, Shinagawa, Tokyo; Japan
- Coordinates: 35.6051°N 139.7423°E
- Operator: Keikyu
- Line: Keikyu Main Line

Construction
- Structure type: Elevated

Other information
- Station code: KK05
- Website: Official website

History
- Opened: 8 May 1904; 122 years ago

Services
Preceding station	Keikyu	Following station
Tachiaigawa KK06 towards Uraga	Main Line Local	Aomono-yokochō KK04 towards Shinagawa
Location
- Location within Japan

Samezu Station (鮫洲駅, Samezu-eki) is a railway station on the Keikyu Main Line in Shinagawa, Tokyo, Japan, operated by the private railway operator Keikyu. It has the station number "KK05".

== Lines ==
Samezu Station is served by the Keikyu Main Line.

== Station layout ==
Samezu Station is an elevated station with a single island platform serving two tracks. This station has side-tracks where fast trains can overtake local trains waiting on the platform.

=== Platforms ===
1	Keikyū Main Line	for Keikyū Kamata, Yokohama, and Uraga; Keikyū Zushi Line for Zushi·Hayama; Keikyū Kurihama Line for Keikyū Kurihama
2	Keikyū Main Line	for Shinagawa

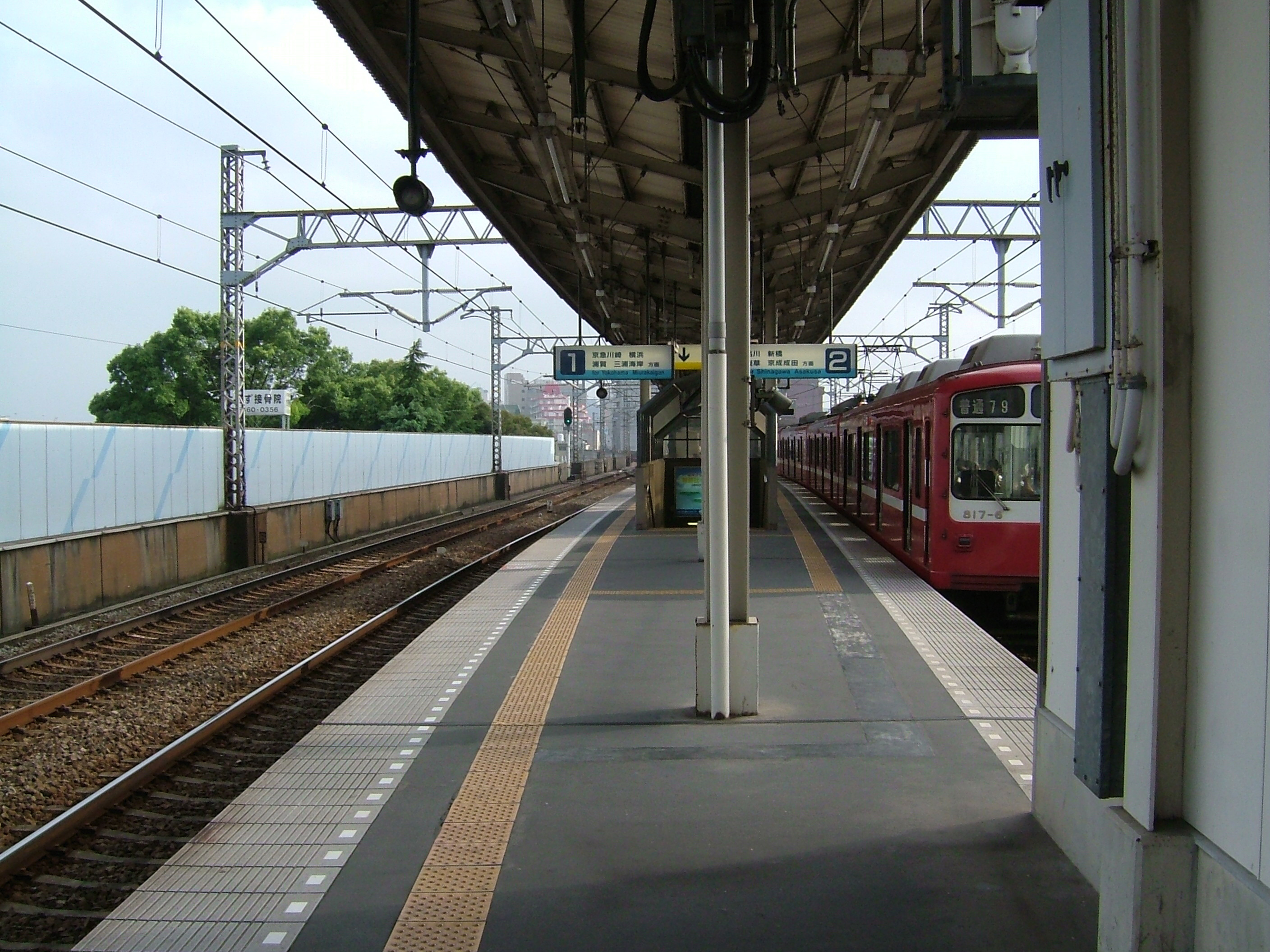
The station platforms in July 2004

== History ==
Samezu station opened on 8 May 1904.

Keikyu introduced station numbering to its stations on 21 October 2010; Samezu was assigned station number KK05.
