= Suzugamori execution grounds =

Historic site in Edo, Japan

Coordinates: 35°35′30″N 139°44′11.2″E

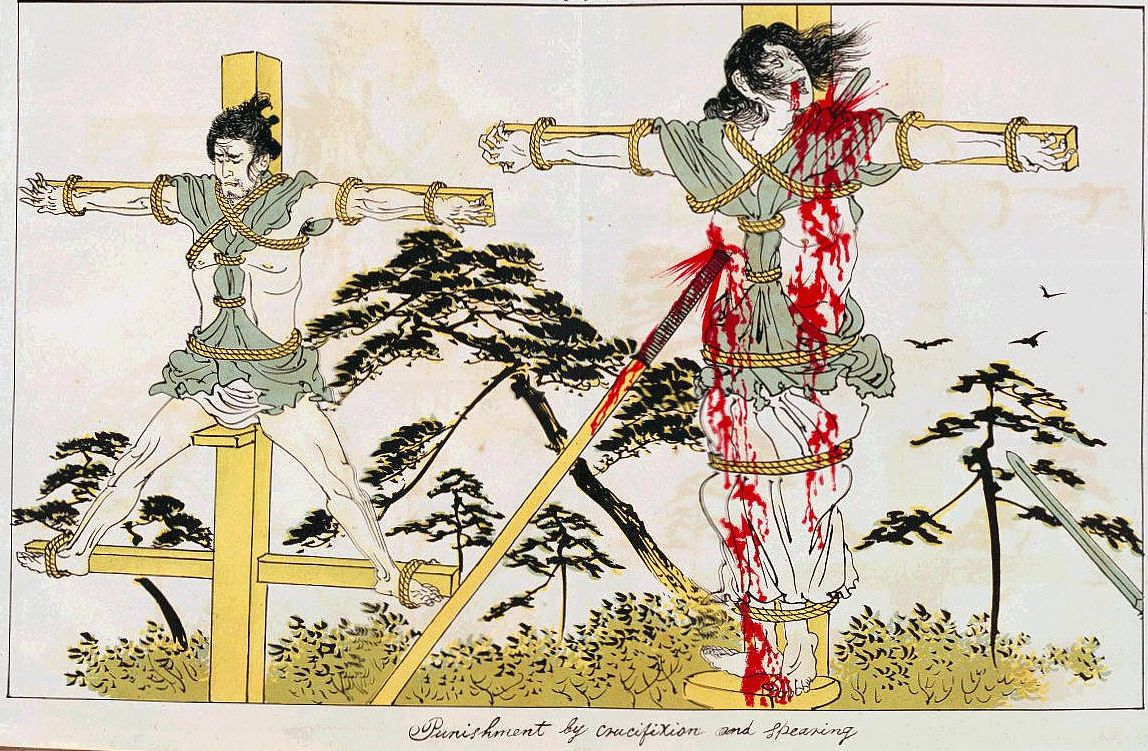
An 1893 illustration showing an execution at Suzugamori

The Suzugamori execution grounds (鈴ヶ森刑場, Suzugamori keijō) were one of many sites in the vicinity of Edo (the forerunner of present-day Tokyo, Japan) where the Tokugawa shogunate executed criminals, anti-government conspirators and Christians in the Edo period. Others sites included Shibaguchi, Honzaimokuchou, Itabashi, near the Torigoe Myoujin shrine, in front of Saihouji in Kondobashi, and Kotsukappara. The Suzugamori grounds were established in 1651 and operated until 1871. During this 220 year time period, an estimated 100,000 people were executed at Suzugamori.

== History ==
The site measured about 74×16.2 meters. It was located along the Tōkaidō near the entrance to Edo. Criminals were executed on the outskirts of the city to avoid the "spiritual pollution" of the city. A memorial is currently located on a triangular piece of land where Kyu-Tokaido Avenue and Dai-Ichi Keihin Route cross, alongside Route 15 (the Number 1 Keihin Expressway) in Minami Ōi, Shinagawa, Tokyo. It is about a ten-minute walk from Ōmori-Kaigan Station on the Keikyū Main Line.

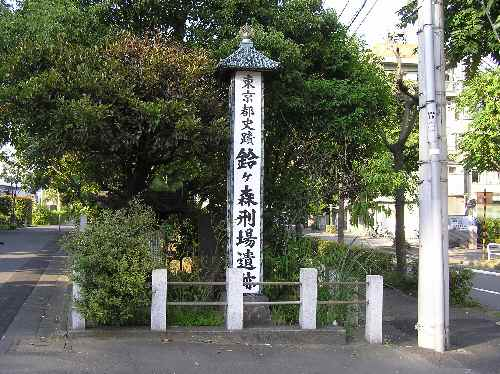
The modern site of Suzugamori

At the time, Suzugamori was on Edo (Tokyo) Bay, and criminals were also executed in the bay. They were suspended upside-down, and drowned when the tide rose.

The first person executed at Suzugamori is thought to have been Marubashi Chūya, a leader of the Keian Uprising. He had already been killed but was drowned as an example to prevent similar uprisings. Other criminals executed at Suzugamori include Ten'ichi-bō and Yaoya Oshichi.

A few remnants are still on the site. Among them are a well, an iron post for execution by burning, and a stone base for erecting wooden pillars for crucifixion. (The stone base has been moved from its original position.)
