= Ōmorimachi Station =

Railway station in Tokyo, Japan

Coordinates: 35.5723°N 139.7323°E

KK09 Ōmorimachi Station 大森町駅
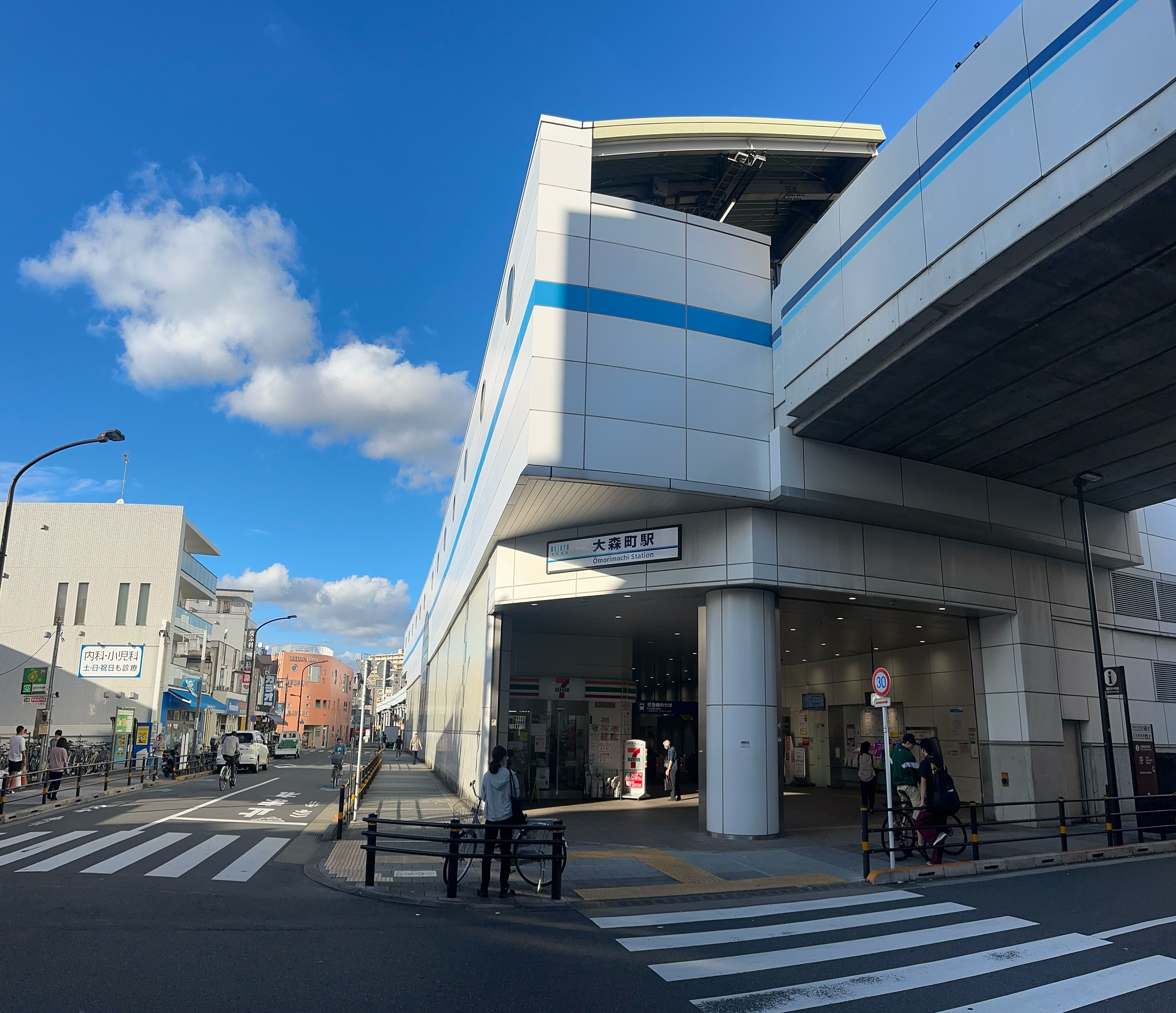
- Station building, July 2020

General information
- Location: Ōta, Tokyo; Japan
- Operator: Keikyu
- Line: Keikyū Main Line

Construction
- Structure type: Elevated
- Accessible: Yes

History
- Opened: 1952; 74 years ago

Services
Preceding station	Keikyu	Following station
Umeyashiki KK10 towards Uraga	Main Line Local	Heiwajima KK08 towards Shinagawa
Location

Ōmorimachi Station (大森町駅, Ōmorimachi-eki) is a railway station in the Ōmori section of Ōta, Tokyo, Japan. The station is along the Keikyū Main Line.

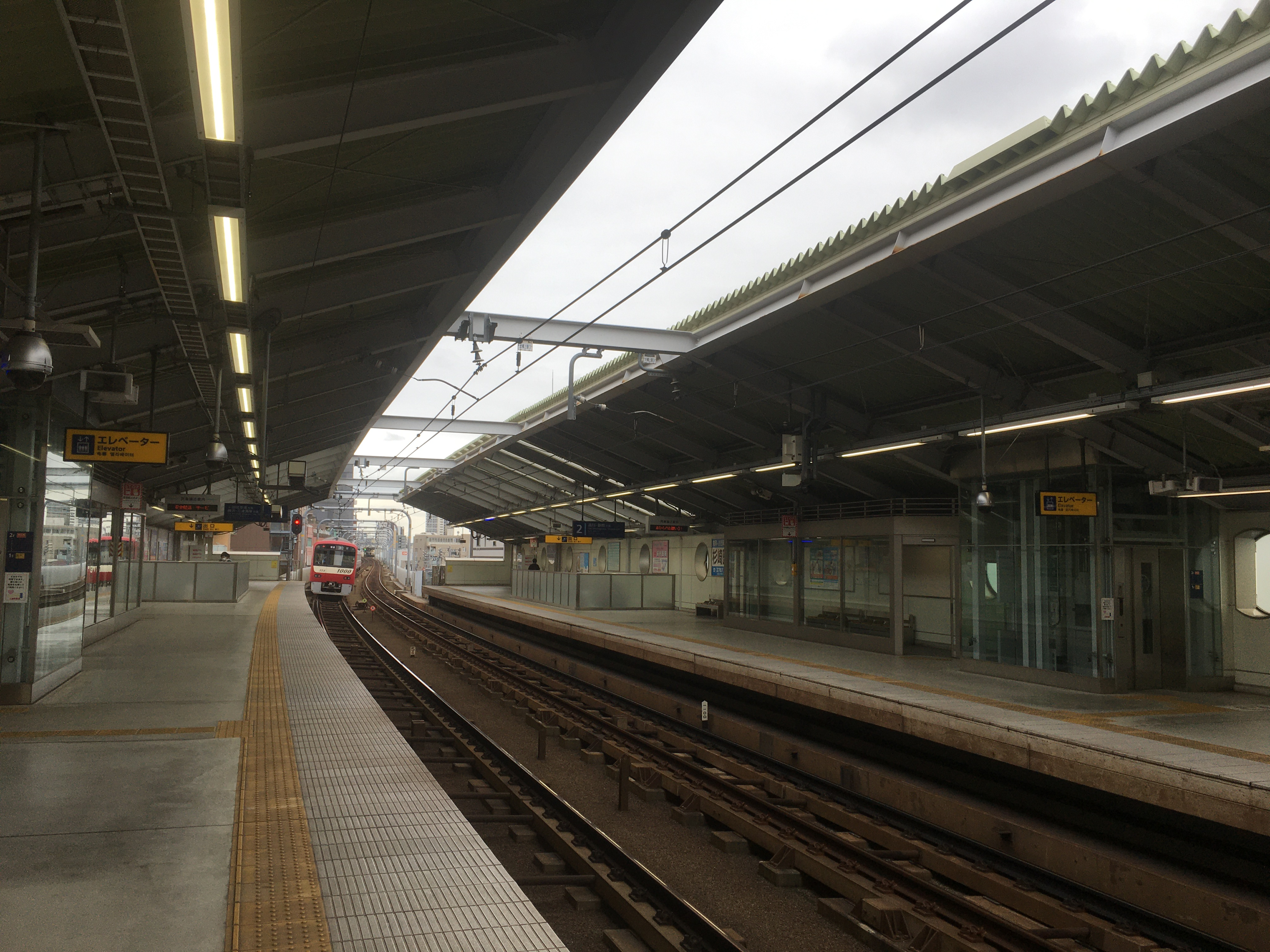
Platforms, 2020

== Layout ==
The station has two side platforms serving two tracks. Both platforms are on the upper level and connected by stairs, escalators and elevators to the ground level where ticket office, gates and toilets are located.

1	Keikyū Main Line	for Yokohama, Kanazawa-Hakkei, and Uraga; Keikyū Zushi Line for Zushi·Hayama
2	Keikyū Main Line	for Shinagawa

== History ==
The station opened in December 1952. The location was where Ōmori-San'ya Station (大森山谷駅) (originally San'ya Station) existed from 1906 to the unknown date during the World War II (official closure following the suspension was in 1949). Prior to the move to this location, San'ya Station was on a nearby street from 1901.

The platforms originally on the ground level were moved to the new elevated tracks on 16 May 2010 (Shinagawa-bound track) and on October 21, 2013 (Uraga-bound track).

Keikyu introduced station numbering to its stations on 21 October 2010; Ōmorimachi was assigned station number KK09.
