= Yaoya Oshichi =

Japanese teenager executed by burning at the stake for arson

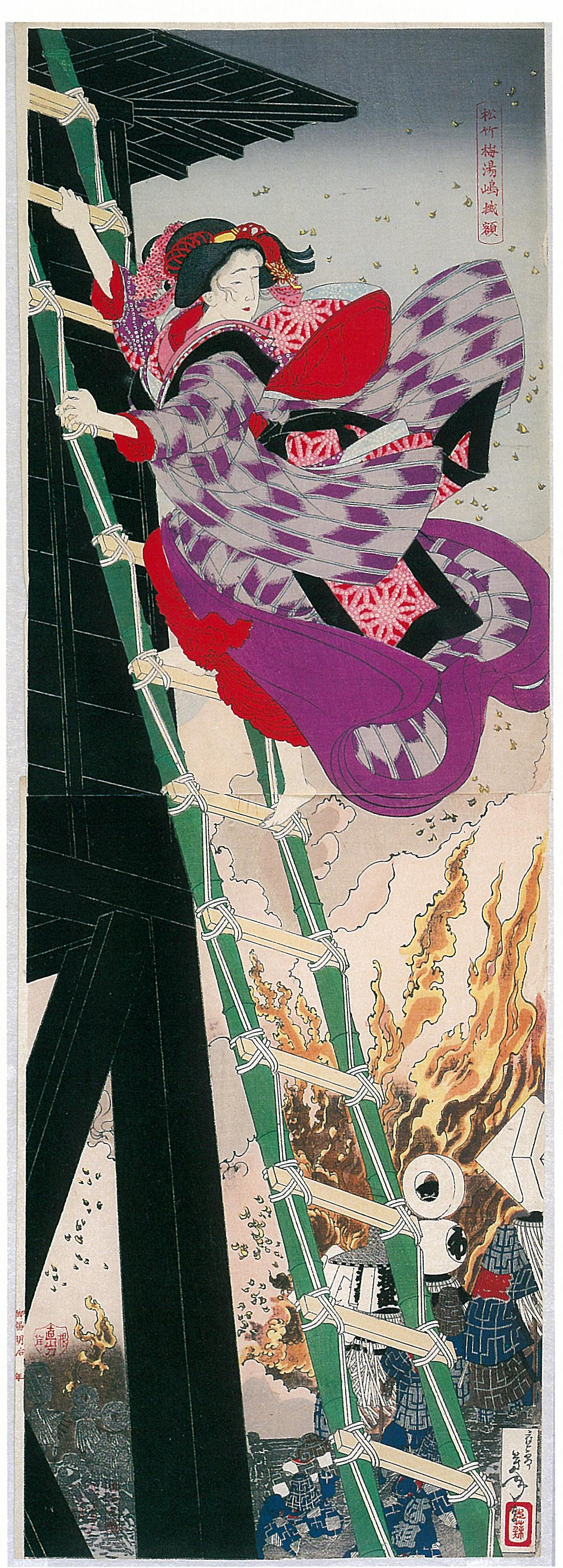
Oshichi, ukiyo-e by Tsukioka Yoshitoshi, 19th century

Yaoya Oshichi (八百屋お七; c. 1667 – 29 March 1683), literally "greengrocer Oshichi", was a daughter of the greengrocer Tarobei, who lived in the Hongō neighborhood of Edo at the beginning of the Edo period. She was burned at the stake for attempting to commit arson. The story (see below) became the subject of joruri plays. The year of her birth is sometimes given as 1666.

== Biography ==
In December 1682, she fell in love with Ikuta Shōnosuke (or Saemon), a temple page, during the great fire in the Tenna Era, at Shōsen-in, the family temple (danna-dera). The next year she attempted arson, thinking she could meet him again if another fire occurred. She was caught by the police and burnt at the stake in Suzugamori for her crimes.

The magistrate at her trial, though knowing she was sixteen years old, asked her, "You must be fifteen years old, aren't you?" At the time, boys and girls under the age of sixteen were not subject to the death penalty, and since strict family registration systems were not yet widely implemented, confirmation of age by a bureaucrat was sufficient. Misunderstanding the magistrate's intentions to try her as a minor, she replied that she was sixteen. At a loss, the magistrate asked her firmly again, "You must be fifteen years old, are you not?" Not taking the hint again, she honestly stated her age as sixteen, leaving the magistrate no alternative but to sentence her to burn at the stake.

== Legacy ==
There is a memorial to Oshichi at Enjō-ji in Tokyo. Daien-ji in Tokyo has a Hōroku Jizō (ほうろく地蔵, hot pot Jizō) with a cooking pot on his head to symbolically take away the heat from the fire of the stake that Oshichi was sentenced upon. Cooking pots and origami cranes are still offered to this day.

In the calendar then used in Japan, a year is known by five elements, and one of 12 animals. Oshichi was born in 1666, the year of the fire horse (Hinoe Uma), which recurs every 60 years. Since then, it has been thought inauspicious for a girl to be born in the year of the fire horse – and in Japan, fewer children are born in such years (the most recent prior to 2026 being 1966).

== Novels ==
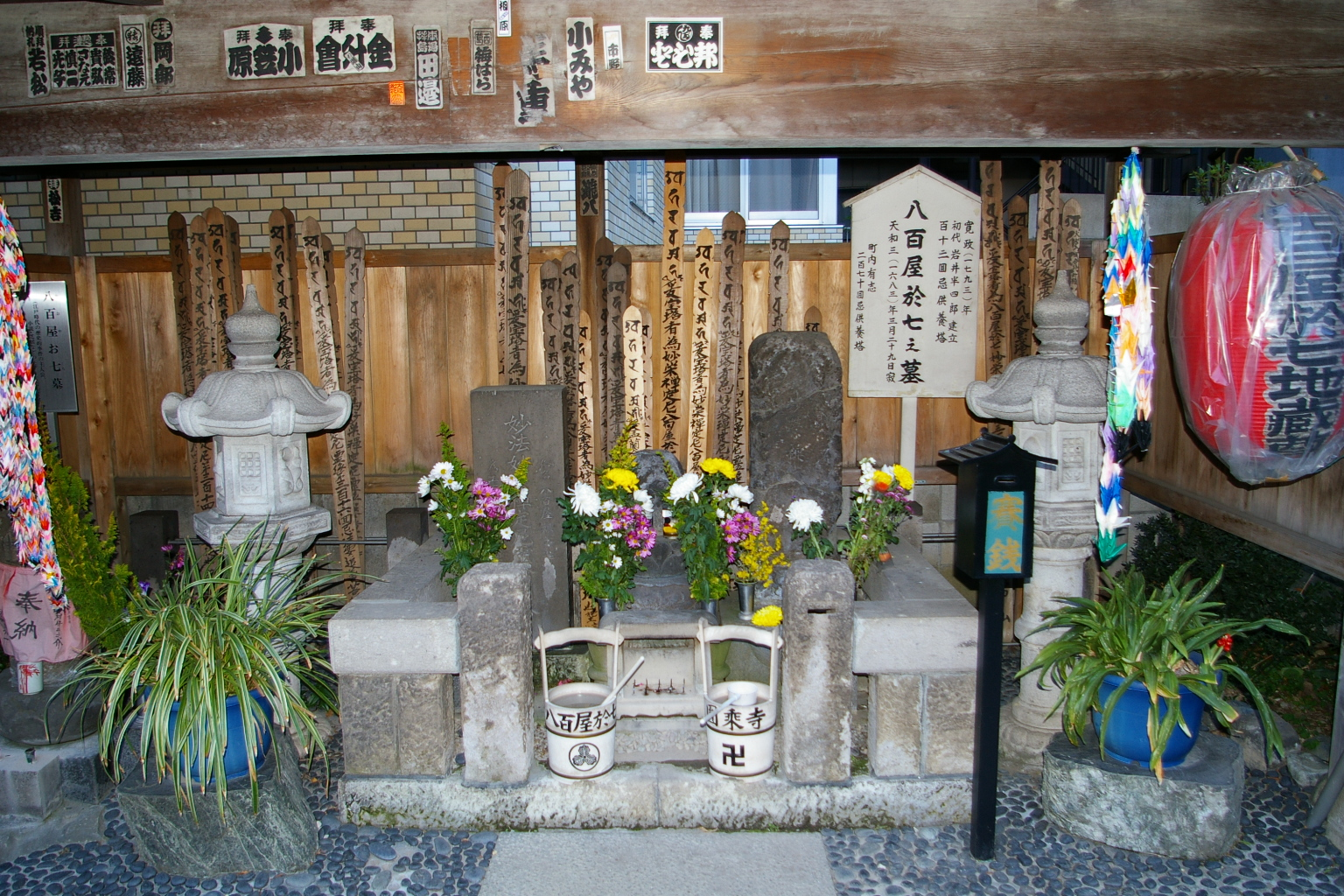
Memorial to Oshichi at Enjō-ji in Tokyo

Three years later, Ihara Saikaku described this case in the book Kōshoku Gonin Onna (English translation, Five Women Who Loved Love). Twenty years after Yaoya Oshichi's death, a playwright, Ki no Kaion, took great liberties with the story to create a play for the traditional puppet theater entitled Yaoya Ohichi. In 1773, three playwrights (Suga Sensuke, Matsuda Wakichi, and Wakatake Fuemi) further revised Ki no Kaion's play to produce Date musume koi no higanoko. In these two versions, Oshichi does not commit arson, instead she climbs a fire tower on a snowy night to ring the alarm bell to open the city gates in order to save the life of her lover, whom she cannot otherwise reach because of the nightly curfew. The penalty, however, for sounding a false fire alarm is death, a fate Oshichi chooses to face. In the puppet plays, the character of Oshichi is presented not as the seemingly impetuous, foolish girl of the historical record, but instead as a noble figure whose selfless devotion saves the man she loves. Later playwrights developed Oshichi's story for the stage: Tamenaga Tarobei in Junshoku Edo Murasaki, and Tsuruya Nanboku in Katakiuchi Yagura daiko.

== Bunraku and Kabuki ==
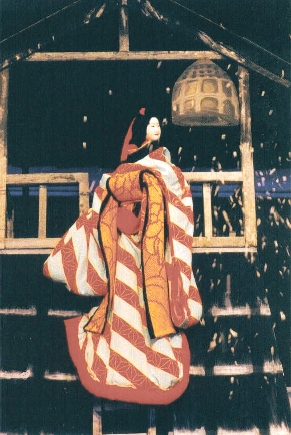
Bunraku scene from Date Musume Koi no Higanoko (伊達娘恋緋鹿子) depicting Yaoya Oshichi climbing the tower

A kabuki play about her uses the technique called ningyo buri, where the actor moves around as if a puppet. This in turn is taken from the bunraku play.

== See also ==
- Herostratus, another classical youth arsonist.
