= Sonia =

Sonia, Sonja or Sonya, a name of Greek origin meaning wisdom, may refer to:

== People ==
- Sonia (name), a feminine given name, including lists of people named Sonia, Sonja and Sonya

- Sonia (actress), Indian film actress in Malayalam and Tamil films
- Sonia (Bangladeshi actress), Bangladeshi actress and model
- Sonia (singer), British pop singer Sonia Evans
- Sonia, pen name of Ottavia Vitagliano (1894–1975), an Italian writer
- Sonia, code-name of Ursula Kuczynski, also known as Beurton, a spy for the USSR
- Queen Sonja of Norway (born 1937)
- Sonia Ben Ammar, French fashion model, actress and singer known mononymously as SONIA

- Sonia people, an ethnic group of Papua New Guinea

== Arts and entertainment ==
- Sonia (1921 film), a British silent film
- Sonia (1986 film), a Canadian drama film
- Sonja (film), a 1943 Swedish film directed by Hampe Faustman
- Sonia, a character in the 2008 Indian film Race portrayed by Bipasha Basu
- Sonia Kapoor Roy, in the 2004 Indian film Aitraaz a character portrayed by Priyanka Chopra
- Sonia (album), a 1991 album by Sonia Evans

== Other uses ==
- List of storms named Sonia
- Sonia, the allied code name for the Mitsubishi Ki-51, Japanese WW2 era bomber
- SONIA, Sterling OverNight Index Average, a financial market rate
- Sonia (genus), a genus of moths
- M/V Sonia, a passenger ferry
- Sonia language, a language of Papua New Guinea

== See also ==
- Sania (disambiguation)
- Sonia Vihar, a neighbourhood of North East Delhi, Delhi, India
  - Sonia Vihar metro station
