= Sanaya =

Sanaya or alternatively Sanaia may refer to:

== People ==
=== Sanaia ===
- Giorgi Sanaia, sometimes Giorgi Sanaya (1975–2001), Georgian television journalist

=== Sanaya ===
- Anzor Sanaya (born 1989), Russian footballer
- Sanaya Irani (now Sehgal) (born 1983), Indian actress
- Sanaya Pithawalla (born 4 August 1993) is an Indian model and actress
- Valter Sanaya (1925–1999), Soviet footballer
- Zurab Sanaya (born 1968), Russian footballer and football coach
