= Sanya (name) =

Sanya is both a given name and a surname. Notable people with the name include:

Given name:

- Sanya Richards-Ross
- Sanya Mateyas
- Sanya Tulasyan
- Sanya Dharmasakti, Prime Minister of Thailand
- Sanya Lopez (born 1996 as Shaira Lenn Osuna Roberto), Filipino actress
- Sanya Malhotra (born 1992), Indian actress

Surname:

- Arinola Olasumbo Sanya (born 1953), professor of physiotherapy

Fictional characters:

- Sanya V. Litvyak, character in the mixed-media project Strike Witches

== See also ==
- Sania
- Sanja
- Shania (given name)
