= Sanja (disambiguation) =

Sanja is a feminine given name.

Sanja may also refer to:

- Sanja (food), a Korean snack
- Sanja (talk show), a Croatian television talk show produced by RTL Televizija
- Sanja (woreda), a district in Amhara Region, Ethiopia
- Sanja Matsuri (Three Shrine Festival), a Shinto festival in Tokyo
