= Siana (given name) =

Female given name

Siana or Sianna is a feminine given name with multiple meanings and pronunciations. Sianna is a minor celtic goddess of hunt. The name is also a diminutive of Siân, the Welsh form of Jane and means "God is gracious." Siana means "the plentiful springs" in the Maasai language. It is also a name used by Sikhs in India meaning "wise." The Bulgarian name Сияна is also usually transliterated as Siana. It was among the top 10 most popular names given to newborn girls in Bulgaria in 2012.

The Sianna name can also be considered an Indian fusion name. In Hindi, 'Sia' means Goddess Sita, the wife of Lord Rama who always has a sacrificing heart. She is Gracious, Divine, Pious, Sacred & above all, Unique. The suffix 'nna' is derived from 'Annapurna' Goddess of inexhaustible food supply who satiates the appetite of all. In Sanskrit, 'Anna' means food/foodgrain/ cooked meal, thereby implying a woman who keeps her family & dear ones happy & contented always by caring for them.

The suffix 'nna' also is a modern day suffix as observed in modern day names like 'Aria-nna'.
