= Sani (surname) =

Sani is a surname. Notable people with the surname include:

- Acryl Sani Abdullah Sani (born 1961), Malaysian police officer
- Atsidi Sani (c. 1830 – c. 1870 or 1918), Navajo silversmith
- Dino Sani (1932–2026), Brazilian football player and coach
- Engelberd Sani (born 1990), Indonesian football player
- Fátima Djarra Sani (born 1968), Guinea-Bissau feminist activist, particularly against female genital mutilation
- Gideon Sani (born 1990), Nigerian football player
- Hassan Sani (born 1958), Malaysian football player
- Miftah Anwar Sani (born 1995), Indonesian football player
- Omar Sani (born 1968), Bangladeshi actor
- Shehu Sani (born 1967), Nigerian senator, author, playwright and human rights activist
- Tina Sani, Pakistani singer
- Uba Sani (born 1970), Nigerian politician
- Umar Sani (born 1963), Nigerian politician
