= Shinagawa Station =

Major railway station in Tokyo, Japan

SGWJT03 JO17 JK20 JY25 KK01 Shinagawa Station 品川駅
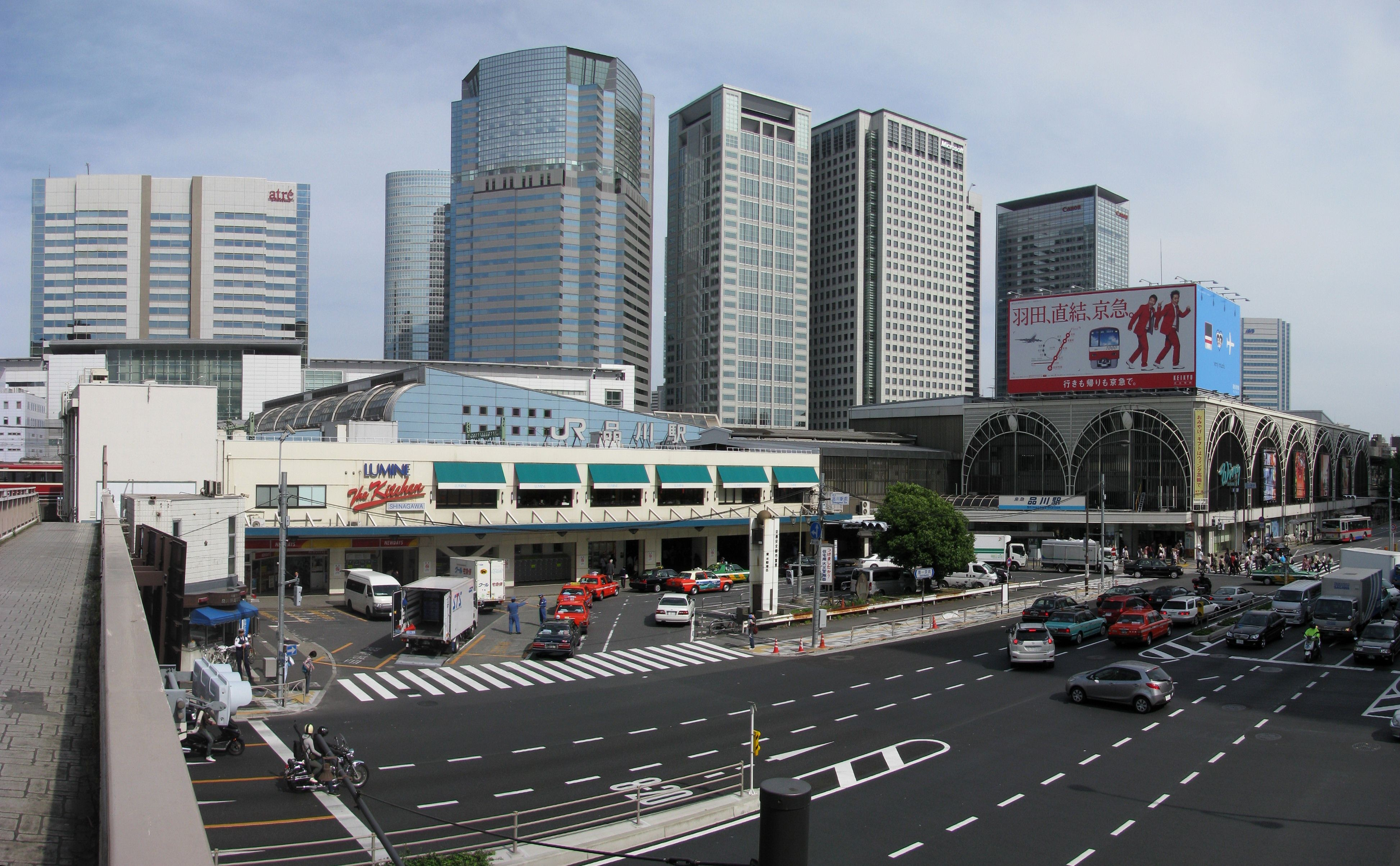
- Exterior of Shinagawa Station, May 2011

General information
- Location: 3 Takanawa, Minato, Tokyo; Japan
- Coordinates: 35°37′43″N 139°44′21″E
- Operator: JR East; JR Central; Keikyu
- Lines: Tōkaidō Shinkansen; Yamanote Line; Keihin–Tōhoku Line; Tōkaidō Line; Yokosuka Line; Keikyū Main Line; Jōban Line (Rapid) (via the Ueno-Tokyo Line)
- Connections: Bus terminal

Construction
- Accessible: Yes

Other information
- Station code: JT03 (Tōkaidō Main Line); JO17 (Yokosuka Line); JK20 (Keihin-Tohoku Line); JY25 (Yamanote Line); KK01 (Keikyu)

History
- Opened: 12 June 1872; 154 years ago

Passengers
- FY2024: 575,878 daily; 75,403 daily; 241,688 daily

Services
Preceding station	JR Central	Following station
Shin-Yokohama towards Shin-Ōsaka	Tōkaidō Shinkansen Nozomi Hikari Kodama	Tokyo Terminus
Other services
Preceding station	JR East	Following station
Takanawa Gateway Next counter-clockwise	Yamanote Line	Ōsaki Next clockwise
Ōimachi JK19 towards Yokohama	Keihin–Tōhoku Line Rapid Local	Takanawa Gateway towards Ōmiya
Yokohama towards Itō	Saphir Odoriko	Tokyo Terminus
Kawasaki towards Itō or Atami	Odoriko	Tokyo Terminus
Ōfuna towards Odawara	Shōnan	Shimbashi towards Tokyo
Ōfuna towards Odawara	Shōnan	Tokyo One-way operation
Kawasaki towards Atami	Tōkaidō Line	Shimbashi towards Tokyo
Terminus	Hitachi	Tokyo towards Sendai
Terminus	Tokiwa	Tokyo towards Takahagi
Terminus	Jōban Line Special Rapid	Shimbashi towards Tsuchiura
Terminus	Jōban Line (Rapid) Rapid	Shimbashi towards Toride
Terminus	Jōban Line Local-Futsuu	Shimbashi towards Sendai
Shibuya towards Shinjuku	Narita Express	Tokyo towards Narita Airport Terminal 1
Musashi-Kosugi towards Ōfuna	Narita Express	Tokyo towards Narita Airport Terminal 1
Nishi-Ōi JO16 towards Kurihama	Yokosuka Line	Shimbashi towards Tokyo
Preceding station	Keikyu	Following station
Kamiōoka One-way operation	Morning Wing	Sengakuji Terminus
Keikyū Kamata KK11 towards Misakiguchi	Evening Wing	Terminus
Haneda Airport Terminal 3 KK16 towards Haneda Airport Terminal 1·2	Main Line Airport Limited Express via Airport Line	Sengakuji Terminus
Keikyū Kamata KK11 towards Horinouchi	Main Line Limited Express (Kaitoku)	Sengakuji Terminus
Aomono-yokochō KK04 towards Uraga	Main Line Limited Express (Tokkyū)	Sengakuji Terminus
Aomono-yokochō KK04 towards Keikyū Kamata	Main Line Express (rush hours)	Sengakuji Terminus
Kitashinagawa KK02 towards Uraga	Main Line Local	Sengakuji Terminus
Location
- Location within Tokyo Yamanote Loop Location within Tokyo wards area Location within Japan

Shinagawa Station (Japanese: 品川駅, Hepburn: Shinagawa-eki) is a major railway station in the Takanawa and Konan districts of Minato, Tokyo, Japan, operated by East Japan Railway Company (JR East), Central Japan Railway Company (JR Central), and the private railway operator Keikyu. The Tokaido Shinkansen and other trains to the Miura Peninsula, Izu Peninsula, and the Tōkai region pass through here. Though a major station in Tokyo, Shinagawa is not served by the Tokyo subway network. However, it is connected to the Toei Asakusa Line via Keikyu through services.

Despite its name, the station is not located in Shinagawa ward. Shinagawa is also commonly used to refer to the business district around the station, which is in Takanawa and Konan neighborhoods of Minato, directly north of Shinagawa ward.

This station is just south of a large yard complex consisting of Shinagawa Carriage Sidings, Shinagawa Locomotive Depot, and Tamachi Depot.

== Lines ==
Shinagawa is served by the following lines:

=== JR Central ===
- Tokaido Shinkansen

=== JR East ===
- Keihin–Tōhoku Line
- Tōkaidō Line
- Yamanote Line
- Yokosuka Line

=== Keikyu ===
- Keikyu Main Line

JR Central announced in 2011 that Shinagawa will be the terminal for the Chūō Shinkansen, a maglev line under construction and scheduled to begin service to Nagoya no earlier than 2035.

== History ==
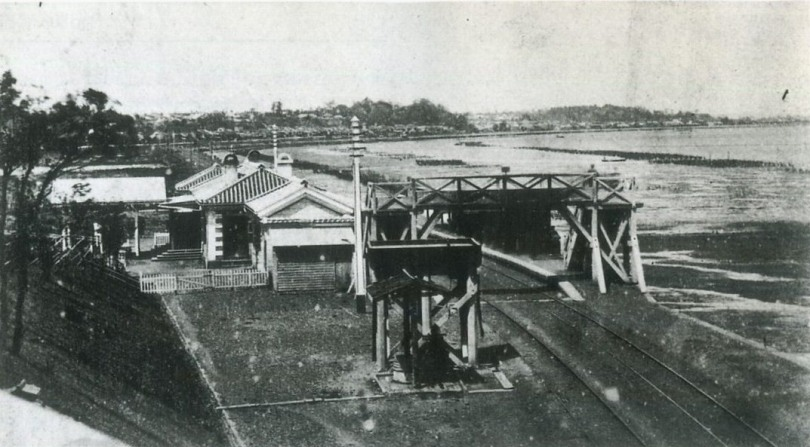
Shinagawa Station in the late 19th century, with the Tokyo Bay shore visible immediately next to the station

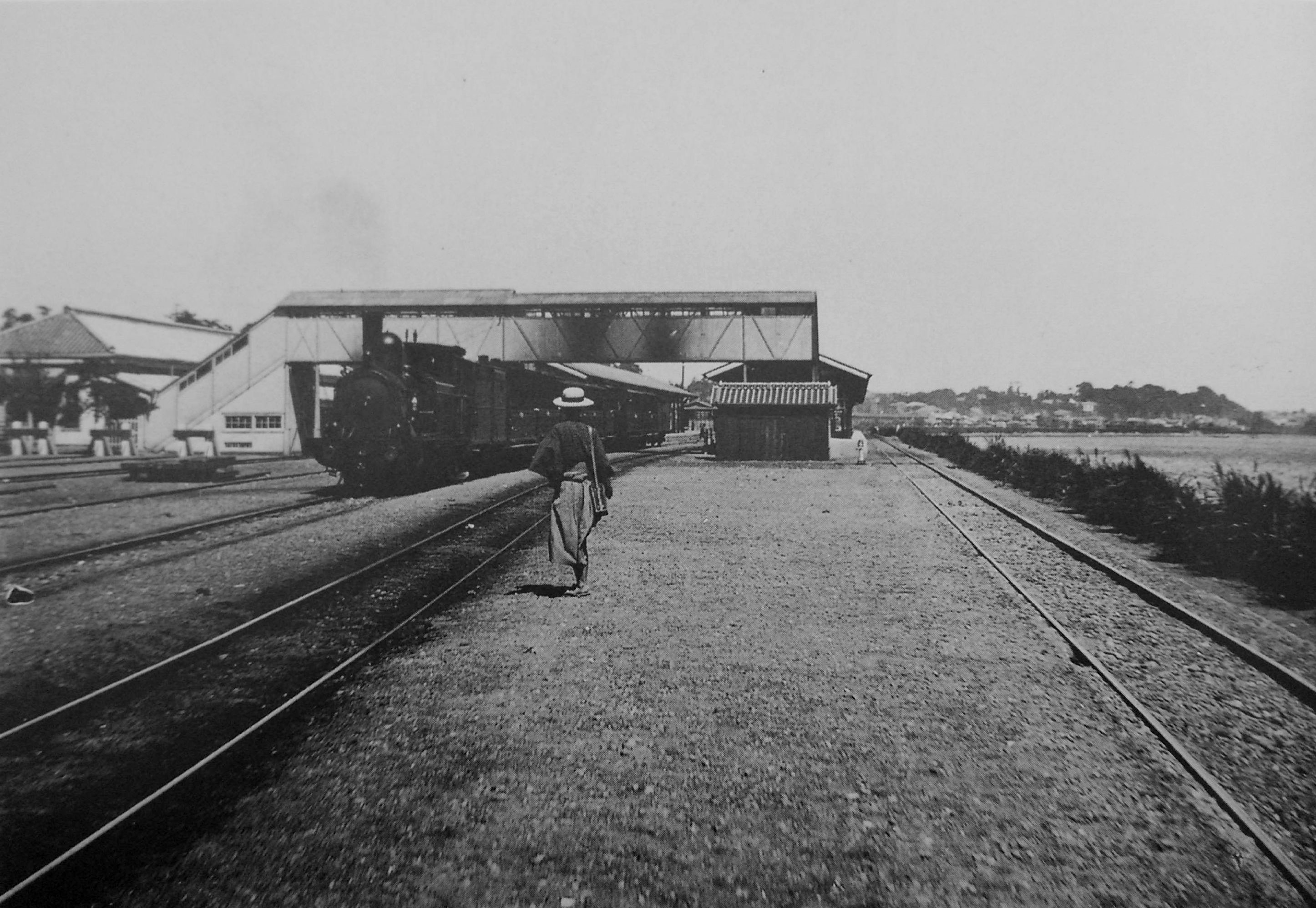
Shinagawa Station around 1897

Shinagawa is one of Japan's oldest stations, opened on 12 June 1872, when the service between Shinagawa and Yokohama provisionally started, four months before the inauguration of "Japan's first railway" between Shimbashi and Yokohama through Shinagawa on 14 October 1872.

Later on 1 March 1885, the Yamanote Line started operation. Takanawa station of the Keikyu Line (then Keihin Railway Line) opened on 11 March 1924 across the street from Shinagawa station. Takanawa station was renamed Shinagawa station and moved to the current site on 1 April 1933.

The Shinagawa station for the Tokaido Shinkansen opened on 10 October 2003. Some services did not stop on the station for the until March 2008. It is said that Kasai Yoshiyuki influenced the construction of the station to encourage travelers to pick Shinkansen over airplane as a form of transport. The Tokyo branch office of JR Central was built on top of the station.

Keikyu introduced station numbering to its stations on 21 October 2010; Shinagawa was assigned station number KK01.

Station numbering was introduced to the JR East platforms in 2016 with Shinagawa being assigned station numbers JT03 for the Tokaido Line, JO17 for the Yokosuka Line, JK20 for the Keihin-Tohoku Line, and JY25 for the Yamanote Line. At the same time, JR East assigned the station a 3-letter code; Shinagawa was assigned the code "SGW".

=== Future plans ===
New ground level Keikyu platforms are currently undergoing construction and are expected to be completed around 2030 as part of the Keikyu's Continuous Grade Separation project.

On 28 January 2022, Tokyo Metro announced that a 2.5 km (1.6 mi) spur line of Tokyo Metro Namboku Line from Shirokane-takanawa to Shinagawa would be built. The extension is expected to cost ¥131 billion (2021) (equivalent to ¥142.46 billion or US$941.14 million in 2024) and scheduled to begin revenue service in the mid-2030s. The subway line platforms will be in a cut and cover tunnel beneath the current station forecourt on the west side of the station.

== Station layout ==
The main JR station concourse is situated above the platforms running east–west across the breadth of the station. A freely traversable walkway divides the station into two sections. The southerly section contains a number of shops and market-style stalls which form the "e-cute" station complex.

Cross-platform interchange between the Yamanote and Keihin-Tohoku lines is only available for Yamanote Line trains to Shibuya and Keihin-Tōhoku Line trains to Tokyo.

The Keikyu platforms are on the western side of the station at a higher level than the JR platforms. Some Keikyu trains terminate at Shinagawa while others continue on to join the Toei Asakusa Line at Sengakuji.

The Shinkansen platforms were opened on October 1, 2003, to relieve congestion at Tokyo Station. Platforms are on the east side of the station.

=== JR platforms ===
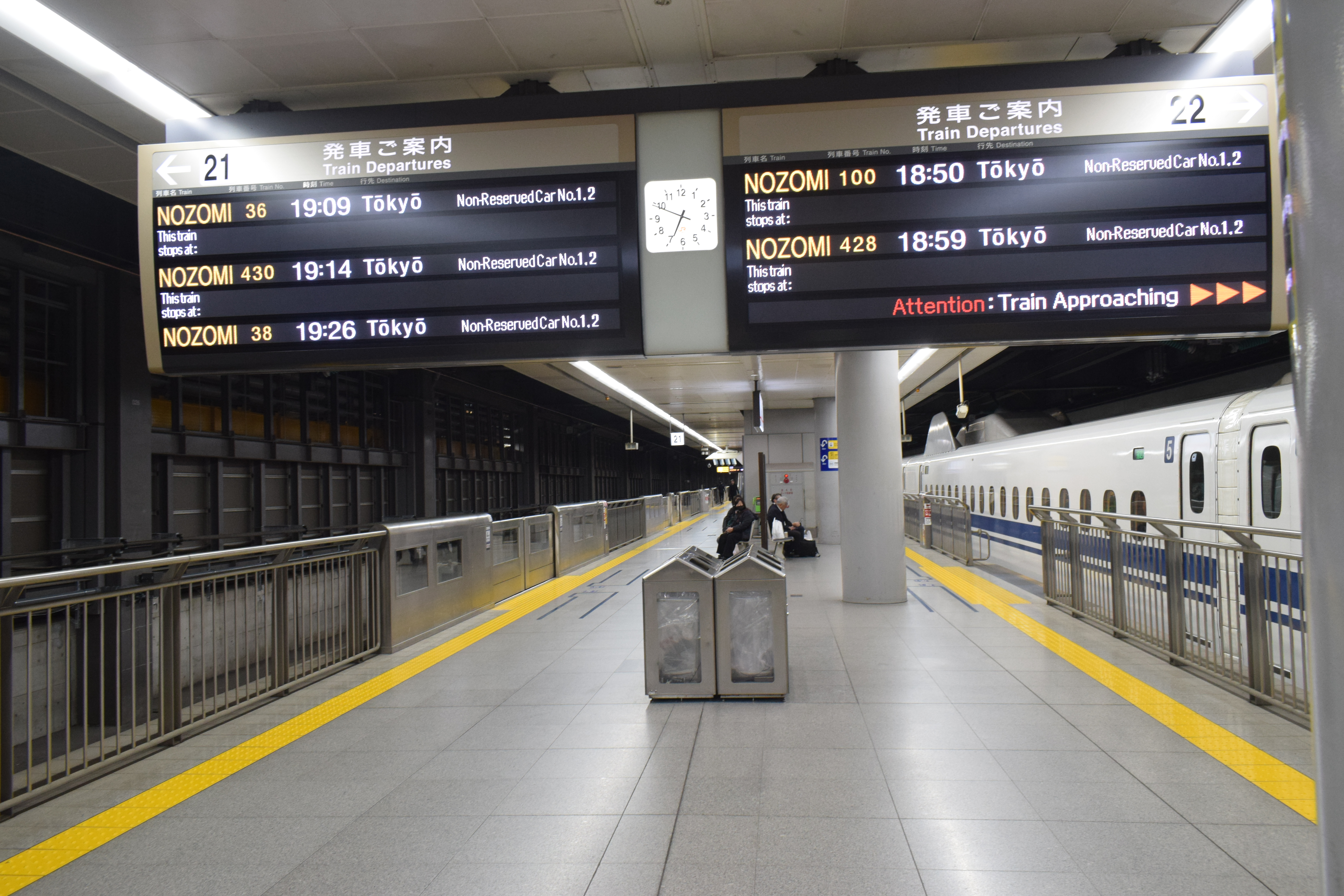
Tokaido Shinkansen platform at Shinagawa station

1	Yamanote Line	for Tokyo, Ueno, and Tabata
2	■ Closed
3	Yamanote Line	for Shibuya, Shinjuku, and Ikebukuro
4	Keihin–Tōhoku Line	for Tokyo, Ueno, and Ōmiya
5	Keihin–Tōhoku Line	for Kamata, Yokohama; Negishi Line for Sakuragichō, and Ōfuna
6-7	Ueno–Tokyo Line	Tōkaidō Line for Tokyo; Utsunomiya Line for Ueno, Ōmiya, Utsunomiya; Takasaki Line for Takasaki
8	■ Spare platform	Not in regular service
9	■ Ueno–Tokyo Line	Jōban Line (Rapid) Ltd. Express Hitachi/Tokiwa for Iwaki, Sendai
10-11	Ueno–Tokyo Line	Jōban Line for Matsudo, Toride, Katsuta, and Narita
11-12	Tōkaidō Main Line	for Kawasaki, Yokohama, Odawara, Atami; Ito Line for Ito
13-14	Yokosuka Line	for Tokyo; Sobu Line for Funabashi, Chiba, and Narita Airport (Terminal 2·3 and Terminal 1)
13-14	Yokosuka Line	■ Limited express Narita Express for Narita Airport
14-15	Yokosuka Line	for Musashi-Kosugi, Yokohama, Ōfuna, and Kurihama

=== Shinkansen platforms ===
21, 22	Tōkaidō Shinkansen	for Tokyo
23, 24	Tōkaidō Shinkansen	for Nagoya, Shin-Osaka, and Hakata

=== Keikyu platforms ===
Keikyu track and platform layout between Shinagawa and Sengakuji

1	Keikyu Main Line	for Keikyū Kamata, Yokohama, and Uraga; Keikyū Airport Line for Haneda Airport (Terminal 3 and Terminal 1·2); Keikyū Kurihama Line for Misakiguchi
2	Keikyu Main Line	for Sengakuji; Toei Asakusa Line for Shimbashi, Nihombashi, and Asakusa; Keisei Oshiage Line for Aoto; Keisei Main Line for Narita Airport (Terminal 2·3 and Terminal 1); Hokuso Railway for Imba-Nihon-Idai; Narita Sky Access Line for Narita Airport
3	Keikyū Main Line	for Keikyū Kurihama and Misakiguchi (Evening Wing)
3	Keikyu Main Line	for Kitashinagawa, Samezu (local trains in mornings only)

== Passenger statistics ==
In fiscal 2017, the JR East station was used by an average of 378,566 passengers daily (boarding passengers only), making it the fifth-busiest station operated by JR East. The passenger figures for previous years are as shown below.

Fiscal year	Daily average
2000	253,575
2005	302,862
2010	321,711
2011	323,893
2012	329,679
2013	335,661
2014	342,458
2015	361,466
2016	371,787
2017	378,566

== Surrounding area ==
=== West side (Takanawa Exit) ===
- Aqua Park Shinagawa
- National Route 15
- Shinagawa East One Tower

=== East side (Konan Exit) ===
- Tokyo University of Marine Science and Technology

== Bus services ==
Services are provided by Toei Bus, Tokyu Bus, Keikyu Bus, Airport Transport Service, and others.

== See also ==
- List of railway stations in Japan
- Transport in Greater Tokyo
