= Sâi =

Sâi Șiu
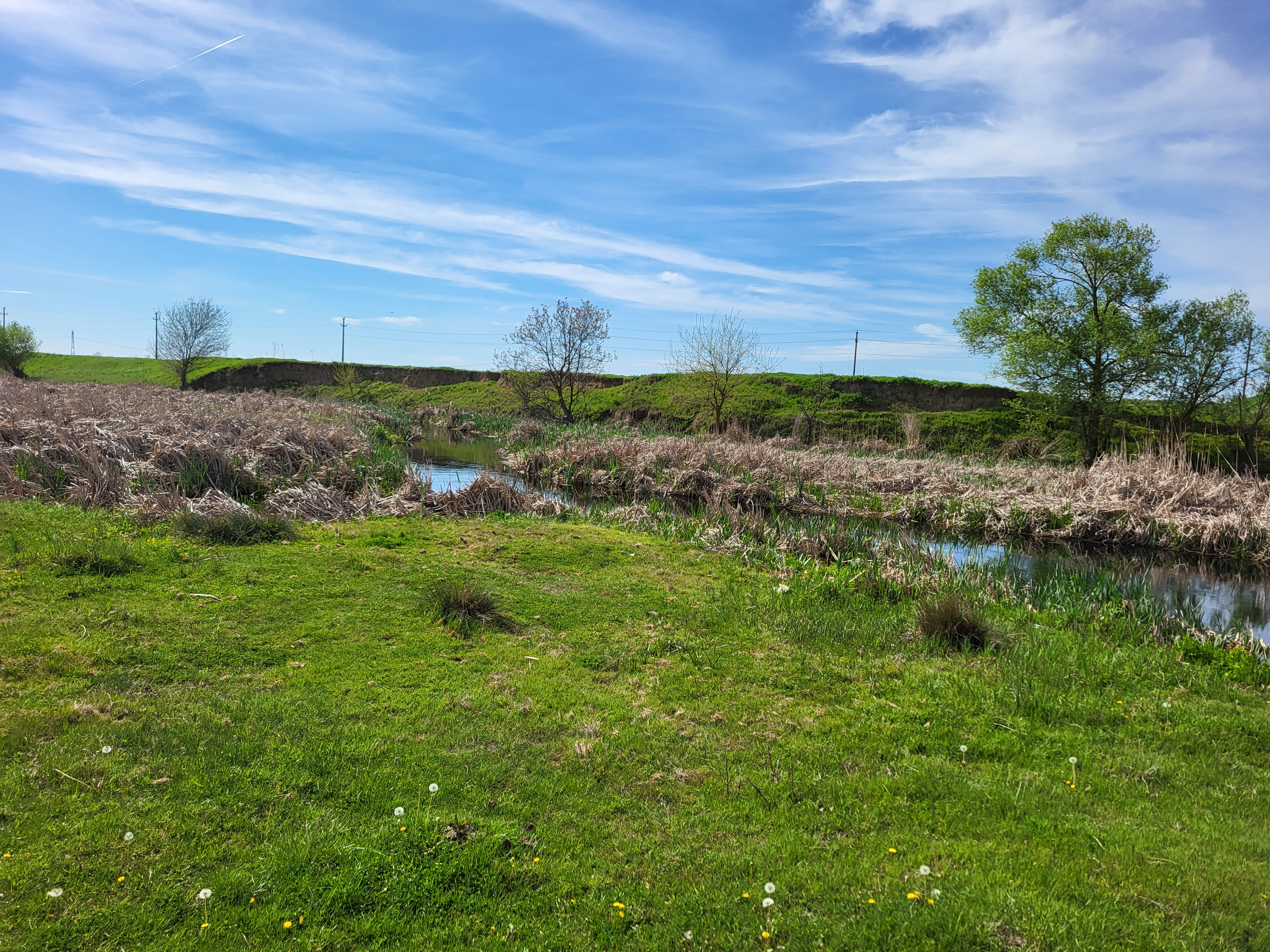

- Location within Romania

Location
- Country: Romania
- Counties: Olt, Teleorman

Physical characteristics
- Mouth: Danube
  - coordinates: 43.7149°N 24.8503°E
- Length: 85 km (53 mi)
- Basin size: 314 km^{2} (121 sq mi)

Basin features
- Progression: Danube→ Black Sea

The Sâi (also: Șiu) is a left tributary of the river Danube in Romania. It discharges into the Danube near Turnu Măgurele. It flows parallel to the lower course of the river Olt, about 5 km east of the Olt, through the villages Dăneasa, Sprâncenata, Beciu, Plopii-Slăvitești, Slobozia Mândra, Uda-Clocociov, Saelele, Lunca, Segarcea-Vale and Lița. Its length is 85 km (53 mi) and its basin size is 314 km^{2} (121 sq mi).
