= Sai =

Sai or SAI may refer to:

== Arts and media ==
=== Fiction ===
- Fujiwara no Sai, a character in Hikaru no Go media
- Sai (Naruto), a character in Naruto media
- Hinoki Sai, a character in the Betterman universe
- Sai Akuto, protagonist of Ichiban Ushiro no Dai Maō
- Sai Argyle, a character in the manga and anime Gundam series
- Sai, a term of respect in Stephen King's The Dark Tower universe
- Sai no Hanaya (the Florist of Sai), a character in the Yakuza series

=== Music ===
- Sai music, a traditional style of music from southern Chad
- Scaled and Icy (2021), sixth studio album by the American musical duo, Twenty One Pilots

== Businesses and organizations ==
=== Companies ===
- SAI Ambrosini, an Italian aircraft manufacturer
- Science Applications Incorporated, original name of Leidos
- Skandinavisk Aero Industri, a former Danish aeroplane manufacturer
- Shaheen Air, a Pakistani airline (ICAO designator SAI)
- Software Architects, Inc., a North American computer software company
- Springfield Armory, Inc., an American firearm manufacturer and importer
- Stability AI, an artificial intelligence company, best known for its text-to-image model Stable Diffusion
- Supersonic Aerospace International, an American aerospace firm

=== Government and military ===
- Solar America Initiative
- South African Infantry Corps
- Sports Authority of India, an Indian government body
- Supreme audit institution, a government audit body

=== Research institutes ===
- University of Texas at Austin South Asia Institute, US
- South Asia Institute (Germany)
- Stan Ackermans Institute, in the Dutch city of Eindhoven
- Sternberg Astronomical Institute, a division of Moscow State University in Russia

=== Other organisations ===
- SAI360, Australian standards organisation
- Sathya Sai Organization, religious organization
- Scout Association of Ireland, 1908–2004
- Society of American Indians, 1911–1923
- Society of Architectural Illustrators
- Sweet Adelines International, women barbershop singers

== People ==
=== Groups ===
- Sai people or Li people, a minority Chinese ethnic group
- Sai (caste)

=== Given name ===
- Sai Kiran Adivi, Indian film director and producer
- Sai Prathap Annayyagari (born 1944), Indian politician
- Sai Bennett (born 1990), British actress and model
- Sai Deodhar (born 1984), Indian television actor
- Sai Mauk Kham (born 1950), ethnic Shan politician and one of the two vice presidents of Myanmar
- Sai Kanakubo (born 1989), Japanese football
- Sai Kiran (born 1978), Indian actor who works in the Telugu film industry
- Sai Wing Mock (1879–1941), New York Chinese criminal and leader of the Hip Sing Tong
- Sai Pallavi (born 1992), Indian actress
- Sai Paranjpye (born 1938), Indian movie director and screenwriter
- Sai Sam Tun, owner of the Loi Hein Co, Ltd. of Myanmar
- Sai Yinjiya (born 1976), male Chinese freestyle wrestler
- Sai Yukino (born 1982), Japanese female author

=== Surname ===
- Anand Sai, Indian art director who works for Telugu films
- Manoj Sai, Indian cricketer
- Marlene Sai (born 1941), Hawaiian singer
- Nand Kumar Sai (born 1946), Indian politician from Chhattisgarh state
- Obodai Sai (born 1984), Ghanaian boxer
- Sai On (1682–1761), scholar-official of the Ryūkyū Kingdom
- Ryouji Sai (born 1980), Japanese professional wrestler
- Sai Taku (1645–1725), Ryukyuan aristocrat and bureaucrat
- Tiaoalii Fauagiga Sai, American Samoan politician
- Veer Surendra Sai (died 1884), Indian freedom fighter
- Vishnudeo Sai (born 1964), Chief Minister of Indian state of Chhattisgarh
- Yōichi Sai (born 1949), Japanese film director
- Yoshiko Sai (born 1953), Japanese singer, composer and poet

=== Other people ===
- Sai, real name Simon Wimmerberg, DJ/producer with the band Labyrint
- Sai Htee Saing (1950–2008), Burmese singer and songwriter of Shan descent
- Sai Maa (born 1953), Mauritian guru

== Places ==
- Sai, Orne, a French village and commune
- Sai, Bhiwani, Haryana, India
- Sai (Mawal), a village in Pune district, Maharashtra, India
- Sai, Raebareli, a village in Uttar Pradesh, India
- Sai, Aomori, a village in Japan
- Lake Sai, one of the Fuji Five Lakes in Japan
- Saï (island), on the Nile in Sudan
- Sai River (disambiguation)
- Siem Reap–Angkor International Airport (IATA airport code SAI)

== Science and technology ==
- SAI (software), painting software
- Serving area interface, or service area interface, an outdoor telecommunications cabinet
- Silent Aircraft Initiative, Cambridge-MIT Institute project
- Single-collateral Dai (cryptocurrency), discontinued
- Steering Axis Inclination, a secondary wheel alignment measurement
- Stratospheric aerosol injection in geoengineering
- Subject–auxiliary inversion in linguistics

== Other uses ==
- Sai (deity), an Egyptian god
- Sai (weapon), an Asian melee weapon
- Toyota Sai, alternate name for the Lexus HS hybrid car
- Self-assessed intelligence
- Senior Army Instructor, in US Army Junior ROTC
- Solar America Initiative

== See also ==
- Sai Baba (disambiguation), an honorific term for ascetics in India
- Sain (disambiguation)
- Sais (disambiguation)
