= Jalalpur Dhai =

Jalalpur Dhai Jalālpur Dhai
- Village
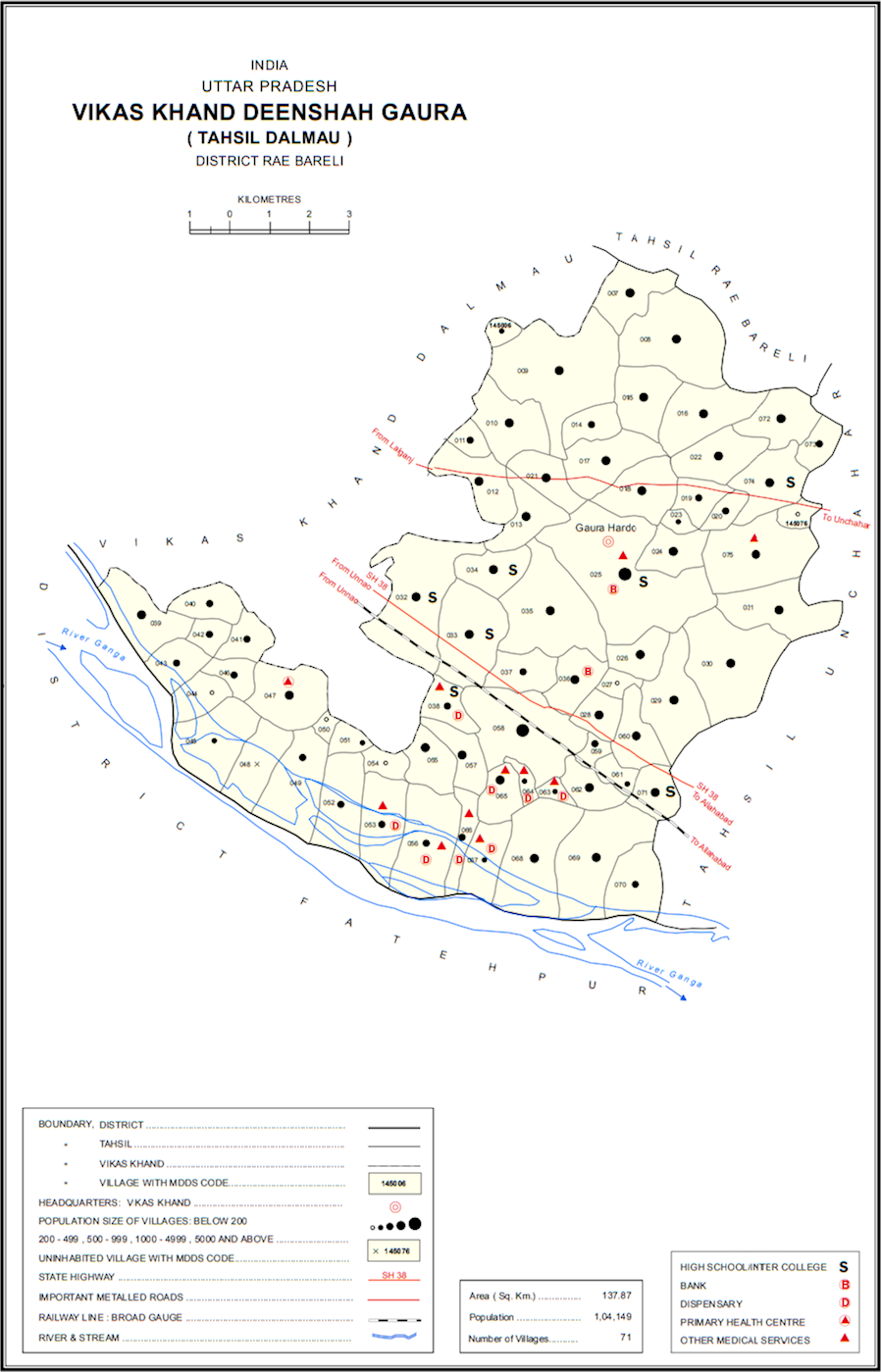
- Map showing Jalalpur Dhai (#058) in Deenshah Gaura CD block

- Location in Uttar Pradesh, India
- Coordinates: 26.00909°N 81.147134°E
- Country India: India
- State: Uttar Pradesh
- District: Raebareli

Area
  - Total: 4.823 km^{2} (1.862 sq mi)

Population (2011)
  - Total: 5,520
  - Density: 1,140/km^{2} (2,960/sq mi)

Languages
  - Official: Hindi
- Time zone: UTC+5:30 (IST)
- Vehicle registration: UP-35

Jalalpur Dhai is a village in Deenshah Gaura block of Rae Bareli district, Uttar Pradesh, India. It is located a short distance north of the Ganges, on the road from Dalmau to Mustafabad. As of 2011, it has a population of 5,520 people, in 966 households. It has one primary school and no healthcare facilities. Jalalpur Dhai hosts markets twice per week, on Wednesdays and Sundays, with cloth and vegetables being the main items traded.

== History ==
The old town of Dhai was supposedly founded by one Raja Dhai Sen before the Muslim conquest of the region, and then one Jalal-ud-Din Ansari founded the village of Jalalpur nearby. Jalal-ud-Din received the village as a grant from Ibrahim Shah of the Jaunpur Sultanate, but by the turn of the 20th century his descendants only held one of the six mahals that made up the village (the others were held by Bais and Banias). At that point, Jalalpur Dhai was described as "formerly a place of some importance, but it has now declined into a merely agricultural village". It had a school and a small bazar called Fazalganj, which had been founded by Sheikh Fazal Ali, a follower of Raja Darshan Singh. There were also two tombs belonging to Saidan Shah and Bahlol, followers of the Muslim folk hero Ghazi Sayyid Salar Masud. The village's population in 1901 was 1,803 people, including 659 Muslims.

The 1961 census recorded Jalalpur Dhai as comprising 8 hamlets, with a total population of 2,487 people (1,273 male and 1,214 female), in 503 households and 466 physical houses. The area of the village was given as 1,297 acres and it had a post office and a medical practitioner at that point. Average attendance of the twice-weekly market was listed as about 200 people.

The 1981 census recorded Jalalpur Dhai as having a population of 3,031 people, in 683 households, and having an area of 524.89 hectares. The main staple foods were listed as wheat and rice.
