= Tikaria =

- Village
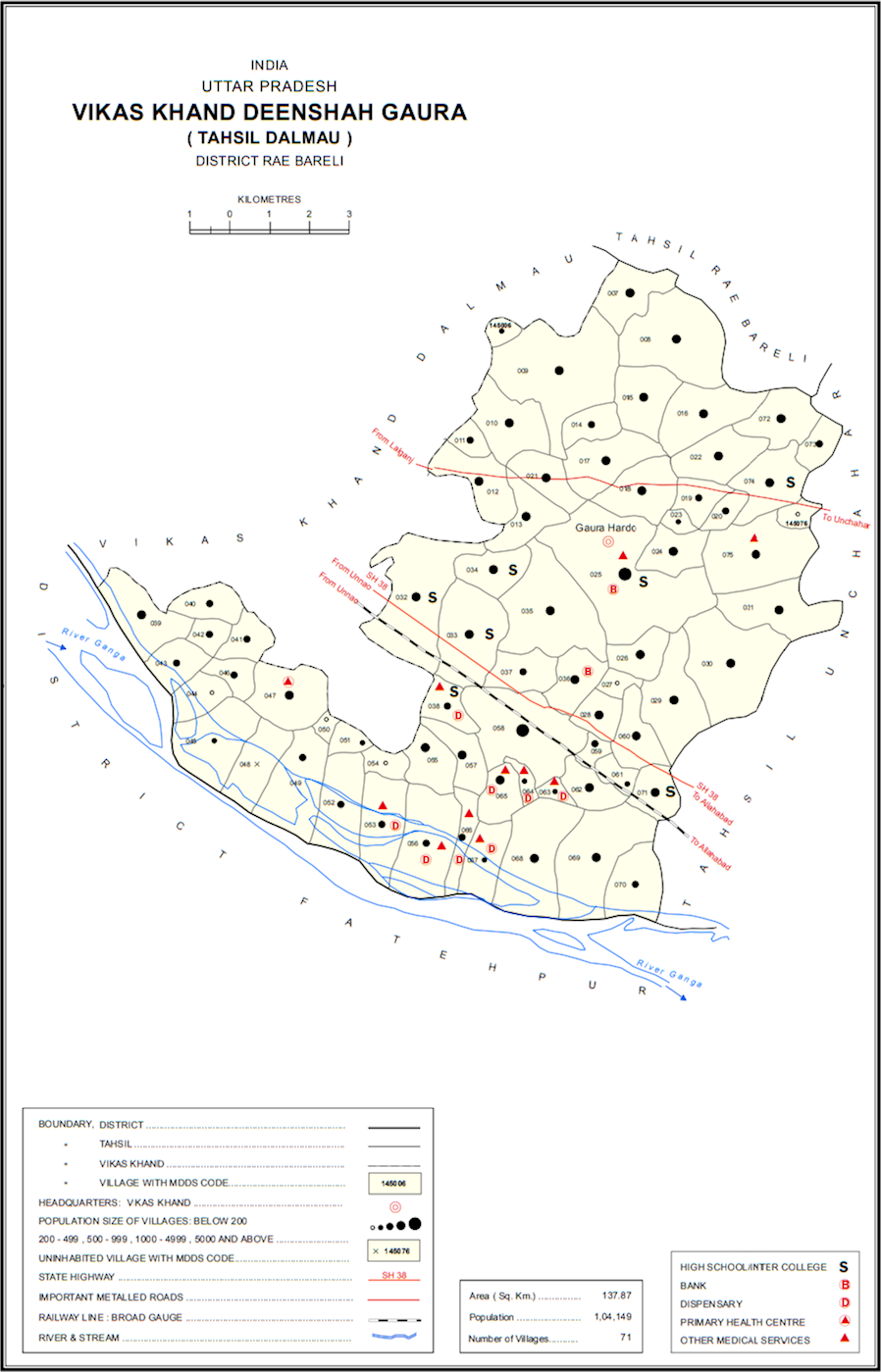
- Map showing Tikaria (#014) in Deenshah Gaura CD block

- Location in Uttar Pradesh, India
- Coordinates: 26.078326°N 81.078326°E
- Country India: India
- State: Uttar Pradesh
- District: Raebareli

Area
  - Total: 0.868 km^{2} (0.335 sq mi)

Population (2011)
  - Total: 812
  - Density: 935/km^{2} (2,420/sq mi)

Languages
  - Official: Hindi
- Time zone: UTC+5:30 (IST)
- Vehicle registration: UP-35

Tikaria is a village in Deenshah Gaura block of Rae Bareli district, Uttar Pradesh, India. It is located 30 km from Raebareli, the district headquarters. As of 2011, it has a population of 812 people, in 140 households. It has no schools and no healthcare facilities.

The 1961 census recorded Tikaria as comprising 1 hamlet, with a total population of 337 people (157 male and 180 female), in 77 households and 77 physical houses. The area of the village was given as 218 acres.

The 1981 census recorded Tikaria as having a population of 457 people, in 85 households, and having an area of 88.22 hectares. The main staple foods were listed as wheat and rice.
