= Gaura Hardo =

- Village
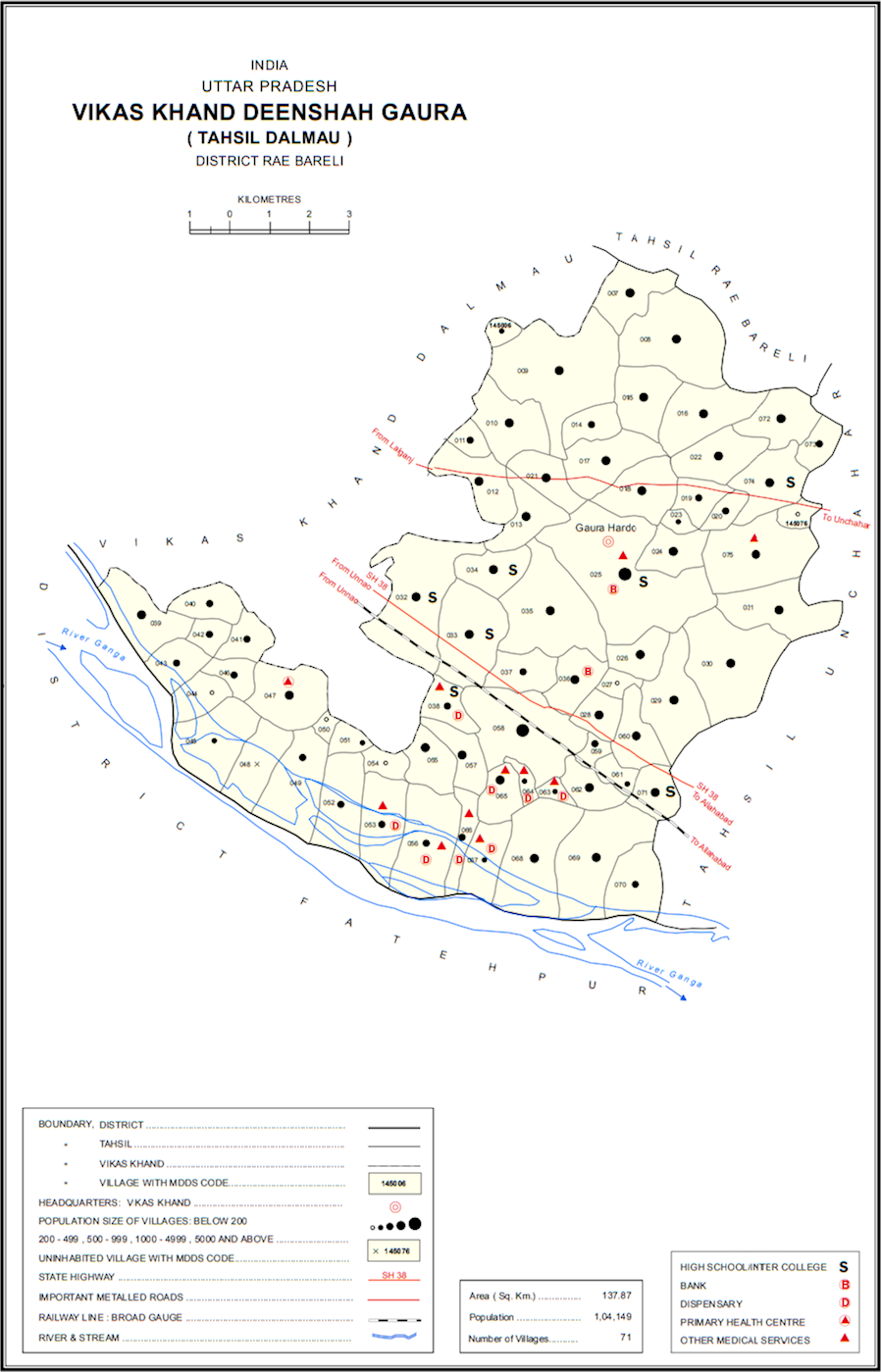
- Map showing Gaura Hardo (#025) in Deenshah Gaura CD block

- Location in Uttar Pradesh, India
- Coordinates: 26.039995°N 81.177748°E
- Country India: India
- State: Uttar Pradesh
- District: Raebareli

Area
  - Total: 8.169 km^{2} (3.154 sq mi)

Population (2011)
  - Total: 8,001
  - Density: 979.4/km^{2} (2,537/sq mi)

Languages
  - Official: Hindi
- Time zone: UTC+5:30 (IST)
- Vehicle registration: UP-35

Gaura Hardo, or just Gaura, is a village in Rae Bareli district, Uttar Pradesh, India. It serves as the headquarters of Deenshah Gaura block, in the tehsil of Dalmau. It is located 33 km from Raebareli, the district headquarters, on the road from Dalmau to Salon. As of 2011, Gaura Hardo has a population of 8,001 people, in 1,446 households. It has five primary schools and one maternity and child welfare centre.

Gaura Hardo has a bazar called Achalganj and hosts markets twice per week, on Tuesdays and Saturdays. Cloth and vegetables are the main items traded. The village also hosts a Dussehra festival annually on Asvina Sudi 10 which draws thousands of attendees. The festival involves a dramatic reenactment from the Ramayana and vendors bring cattle, earthenware pottery, cloth, hosiery, and toys to sell at the event.

== History ==
At the turn of the 20th century, in addition to the Achalganj bazar, Gaura Hardo had a post office and a school. It was held by Bais taluqdars and the Dussehra fair was described as a small one at the time. Its population as of 1901 was 2,501 people, including a Muslim minority of 123.

The 1961 census recorded Gaura Hardo as comprising 20 hamlets, with a total population of 3,076 people (1,614 male and 1,462 female), in 636 households and 594 physical houses. The area of the village was given as 2,075 acres and it had a post office at that point. Average attendance of the Dussehra festival was listed at 10,000 people, and attendance of the twice-weekly market was about 500. It was then part of Jagatpur block.

The 1981 census recorded Gaura Hardo as having a population of 4,350 people, in 896 households, and having an area of 839.72 hectares. The main staple foods were listed as wheat and rice.
