= Sane =

Sane or SANE may refer to:

== Places ==
- Sane (Pallene), ancient Greek city on Pallene
- Sane (Acte), ancient Greek city on Acte (Mount Athos)
- Sâne Vive, a river in France
- Sane, Mali
- Sane (town), a town in Rakhine State, Myanmar
- Vicecomodoro Ángel de la Paz Aragonés Airport, the ICAO code for the airport in Argentina

== People ==
- Sané, a French and Senegalese surname (including a list of persons with this surname)
- Sane Guruji, Indian author and social reformer
- Dan Sane (1896–1956), American musician
- Geeta Sane (1907–1991), Indian writer
- Justin Sane (born 1973), American guitarist and singer for punk rock band Anti-Flag
- Leroy Sané (born 1996), German footballer
- Narayan Sane (1909–2002), Indian cricket umpire
- Sanjeev Sane, Indian political and social activist
- Tidiane Sane (born 1985), Senegalese footballer
- San E (born 1985), South Korean rapper

== Acronym ==
- SANE, the Committee for a SANE Nuclear Policy, now known as Peace Action
- SANE (charity), a mental health charity in the UK
- Scanner Access Now Easy, a free software package for scanner, webcam and digicam computer access
- Standard Apple Numerics Environment, an obsolete software implementation of IEEE 754 floating point arithmetic
- Sexual Assault Nurse Examiner, a nurse with specialized training in the care and forensic examination of victims of sexual assault
- Society for Andaman and Nicobar Ecology, also known as SANE

== Other uses ==
- sane, an English word meaning "of sound mind"; see Sanity
- "Sane", a song from One Second by Paradise Lost
- "Sane", a song from The True Human Design by Meshuggah

== See also ==
- Sain (disambiguation)
- Sani (disambiguation)
