= Ambara Mathai =

Ambara Mathai Ambāra Mathai
- Village
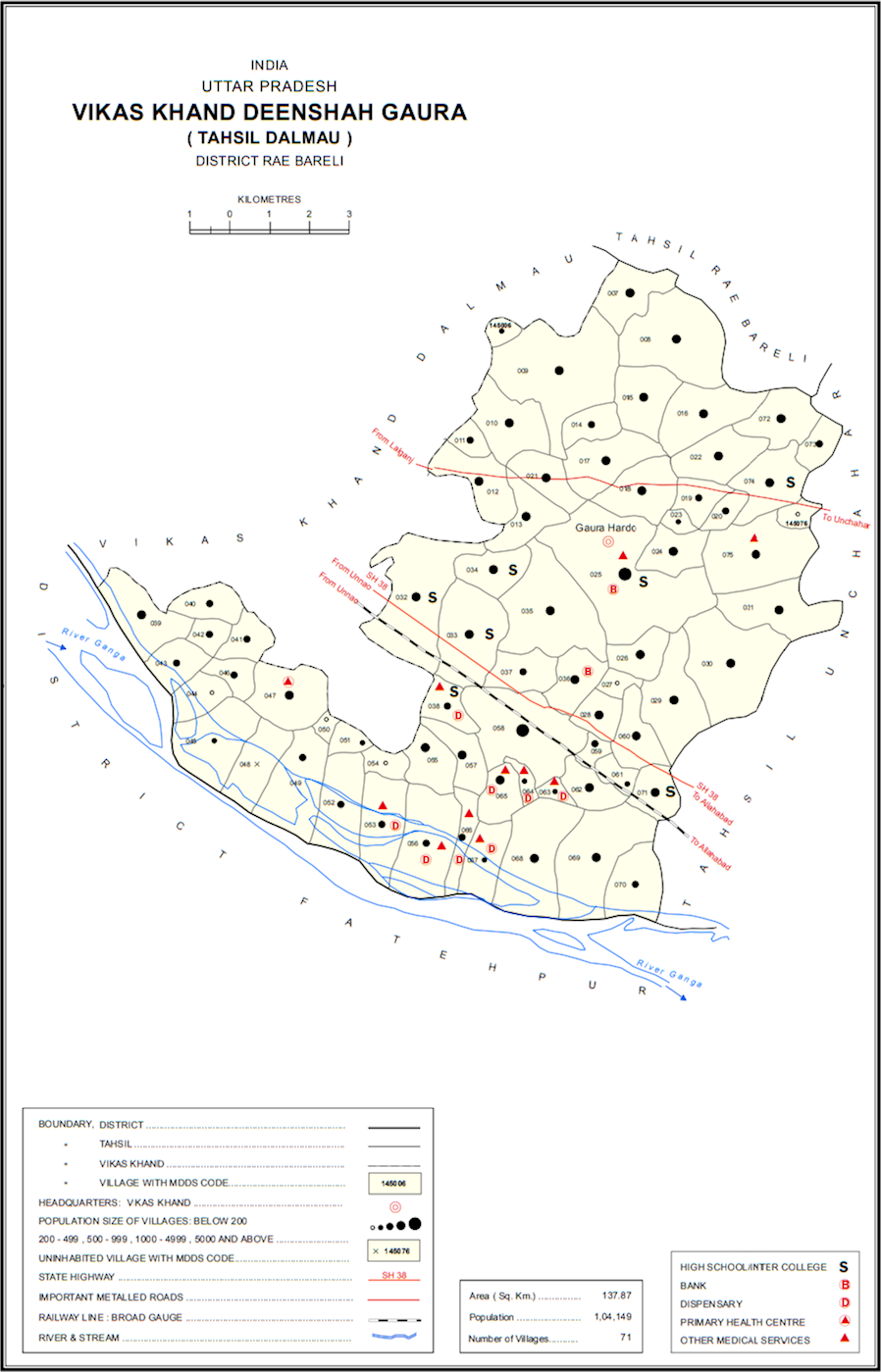
- Map showing Ambara Mathai (#030) in Deenshah Gaura CD block

- Location in Uttar Pradesh, India
- Coordinates: 26.023689°N 81.207585°E
- Country India: India
- State: Uttar Pradesh
- District: Raebareli

Area
  - Total: 5.261 km^{2} (2.031 sq mi)

Population (2011)
  - Total: 3,615
  - Density: 687.1/km^{2} (1,780/sq mi)

Languages
  - Official: Hindi
- Time zone: UTC+5:30 (IST)
- Vehicle registration: UP-35

Ambara Mathai is a village in Deenshah Gaura block of Rae Bareli district, Uttar Pradesh, India. As of 2011, it has a population of 3,615 people, in 648 households. It has three primary schools and no healthcare facilities.

The 1961 census recorded Ambara Mathai as comprising 13 hamlets, with a total population of 1,323 people (657 male and 666 female), in 291 households and 275 physical houses. The area of the village was given as 1,278 acres.

The 1981 census recorded Ambara Mathai as having a population of 1,842 people, in 389 households, and having an area of 517.15 hectares. The main staple foods were listed as wheat and rice.
