= Sain =

Sain may refer to:

== People ==
- Bhagat Sain (14th and 15th centuries), Hindu mystic poet and saint
- Édouard Alexandre Sain (1830–1910), a French painter
- Isidoro Sain (1869–1932), Croatian prelate
- Johnny Sain (1917–2006), American baseball player
- Oliver Sain (1932–2003), American musician and record producer
- Orlando Sain (1912–1995), Italian footballer
- Pappu Sain (c. 1962–2021), Pakistani dhol player
- Paul Saïn (1853-1908), French painter
- Sain Zahoor (born c. 1937), Pakistani Sufi musician

=== Fictional Characters ===
- Sain, a character from the video game Fire Emblem: The Blazing Blade

== Places ==
- Sain, Ardabil, a village in Iran
- Sain, Sareyn, a village in Iran
- Sain, Zanjan, a village in Iran
- Sain Rural District, in East Azerbaijan Province, Iran
- Sain Mohalla, neighbourhood Mandi, Himachal Pradesh

== Other uses ==
- Sain (record label), Welsh record label
- Sain (magazine), Australian music magazine
- Sain (Sen caste), an occupational caste in northern India
- SAIN, the Sustainable Agriculture Innovation Network, UK-Chinese initiative

== See also ==
- Saine, a surname (including a list of persons with the name)
- Sane (disambiguation)
- Sai (disambiguation)
- Sayn, a small German county of the Holy Roman Empire
