= Sai River =

Sai River may refer to:

- Sai River (Gujarat), a river in Gujarat, India
- Sai River (Uttar Pradesh), a tributary of the River Gomti in Uttar Pradesh, India
- Sai River (Nagano), a tributary of Shinano River, the longest in Japan
- Sai River (Gifu), a river in Gifu Prefecture, Japan
- Sai River (Ishikawa), a river near Kanazawa in Ishikawa Prefecture, Japan
- Sâi, a tributary of the Danube in Romania
- Sai River (Thailand), a river that forms the border between Thailand and Burma
