= Thulrai =

- Village
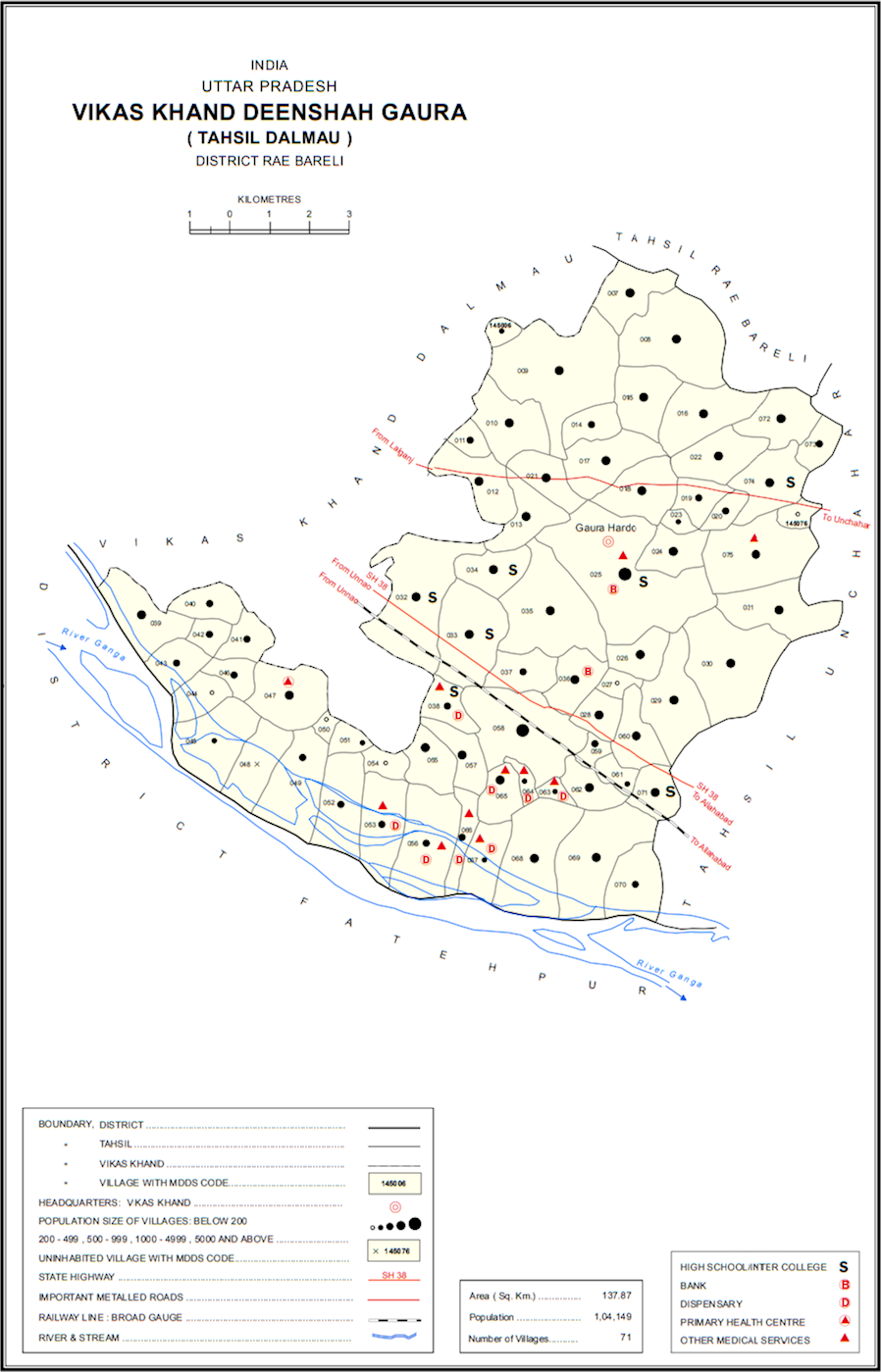
- Map showing Thulrai (#009) in Deenshah Gaura CD block

- Location in Uttar Pradesh, India
- Coordinates: 26.089363°N 81.159233°E
- Country India: India
- State: Uttar Pradesh
- District: Raebareli

Area
  - Total: 10.886 km^{2} (4.203 sq mi)

Population (2011)
  - Total: 4,215
  - Density: 387.2/km^{2} (1,003/sq mi)

Languages
  - Official: Hindi
- Time zone: UTC+5:30 (IST)
- Vehicle registration: UP-35

Thulrai is a village in Deenshah Gaura block of Rae Bareli district, Uttar Pradesh, India. It is located 32 km from Raebareli, the district headquarters. As of 2011, it has a population of 4,215 people, in 763 households. It has one primary school and no healthcare facilities.

The 1961 census recorded Thulrai as comprising 13 hamlets, with a total population of 1,775 people (894 male and 881 female), in 358 households and 317 physical houses. The area of the village was given as 1,964 acres.

The 1981 census recorded Thulrai as having a population of 2,352 people, in 451 households, and having an area of 794.81 hectares. The main staple foods were listed as wheat and rice.
