= Saine =

Saine is a surname. Notable people with this surname include:

- Brandon Saine (born 1988), American football player
- Lori Saine, American politician
- Pap Saine, Gambian newspaper publisher
- Thomas P. Saine (1941-2013), American educator

== See also ==
- Sain (disambiguation), which also lists persons with the name Sain
