= Deenshah Gaura =

Development in Raebareli district, Uttar Pradesh

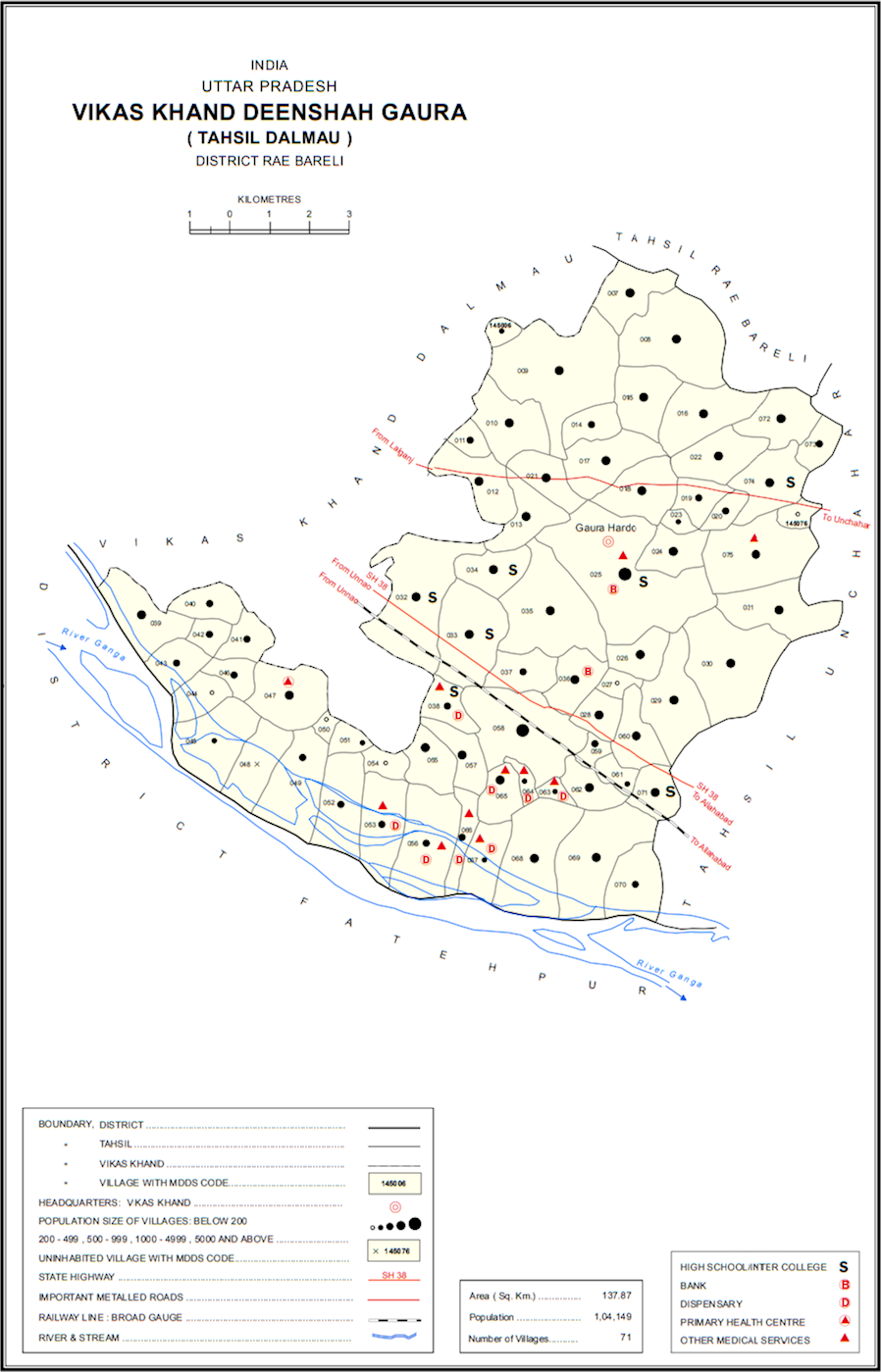
Map of Deenshah Gaura CD block

Deenshah Gaura is a community development block in Dalmau tehsil of Raebareli district, Uttar Pradesh, India. It consists of 71 rural villages, with a total population of 104,149 people. The headquarters are located in the village of Gaura Hardo.

== Demographics ==
As of 2011, Deenshah Gaura CD block has a population of 104,149 people, in 19,192 households. This population includes 53,811 males and 50,338 females. The corresponding sex ratio of 935 females to every 1000 males is lower than the district rural average of 945. About 13.7% of the block's population is in the 0-6 age group as of 2011. The sex ratio of this group is 912, which is lower than the rural average of 928 for Raebareli district. Members of Scheduled Castes make up 30.16% of the block's population, and members of Scheduled Tribes make up 0.04%. The literacy rate of Deenshah Gaura block is 68.39% (counting only people age 7 and up); literacy is higher among men and boys (79.03%) than among women and girls (57.07%). Among Scheduled Castes, the literacy rate is 55.81% — 66.43% among men and boys, and 44.83% among women and girls.

In terms of employment, 17.04% of Deenshah Gaura block residents were classified as main workers (i.e. people employed for at least 6 months per year) in 2011. Marginal workers (i.e. people employed for less than 6 months per year) made up 18.73%, and the remaining 64.22% were non-workers. Employment status varied significantly according to gender, with 49.45% of men being either main or marginal workers, compared to only 21.15% of women.

Agriculture is the predominant source of employment in Deenshah Gaura block: 28.65% of the block's workers were cultivators who owned or leased their own land as of 2011, and a further 48.23% were agricultural labourers who worked someone else's land for wages. Another 4.23% were counted as household industry workers, and the remaining 18.89% were other workers.

== Villages ==
Deenshah Gaura CD block has the following 71 villages:

Village name	Total land area (hectares)	Population (in 2011)
Sebra	57	478
Dhuri	204.9	1,283
Melthuwa	388.1	2,154
Thulrai	1,088.6	4,215
Gaura Khaspari	240.8	1,963
Durgapur	65.7	621
Soorajpur Banapar	104.5	1,112
Kituli	162.1	1,049
Tikaria	86.8	812
Ismail Chak	248.7	1,831
Chooli	218.8	1,398
Sai	263	1,949
Binnawan	235.4	1,908
Kutubapur Bichhaura	84.8	545
Chhichhaura	38.8	862
Raipur Kituli	169	1,161
Sultanpur Janauli	265.5	1,689
Ramnagar	59.8	499
Jharaha	157	1,414
Gaura Hardo (block headquarters)	816.9	8,001
Murethi	128.4	1,041
Mirza Jaddoopur	15.9	169
Kishori Balampur	119.1	1,026
Bansi Rihayak	298.1	1,758
Ambara Mathai	526.1	3,615
Tikar Agachipur	295.8	2,070
Govindpur Madho	467.8	2,421
Charuhar Ziayak	517.8	2,413
Dharmapur Kaili	167.9	1,459
Suttha Hardoi	483.7	2,549
Alipur Chakrai	139.2	1,911
Jamunipur Charuhar	72.5	992
Bahadur Ganj	111	893
Chandpur Look Mu.	281.6	1,254
Mirjapur Urf Soorjpur	353.6	627
Dharmapur	157.9	868
Naraharpur	70.4	993
Kalyanpur Baiti Mu.	69.9	679
Jamunipur Mu.	69	191
Ekadala Mu.	56.9	330
Tarapur Bansi	113	833
Rasulpur Dharawan	253.3	2,769
Paras Rampur	41	0
Newada Patti	100.7	652
Khema Nandpur	24.4	193
Hazaratpur Urf Khwaja	81.8	339
Dhiranpur Mu.	134	970
Narayanpur Banna Mu.	125.6	976
Baharampur	62.5	128
Kiratpur Charuhar Urf	133.8	1,153
Rampur Gauri Mu.	93.1	785
Charuhar Bik	154.1	1,406
Jalalpur Dhai	482.3	5,520
Khonandpur	43.8	986
Korauli Budhkar	169.2	1,898
Sekhupur	48.8.	452
Daudpur Garhai	156.9	1,948
Daudshahpur	28.4	435
Charuhar Ashanandpur	28	234
Chandai Charuhar Mu.	172.6	1,575
Payagpur Mu.	72.3	666
Sultanpur Barhai	81.4	300
Bhagawantpur Chandaniha	280.9	2,895
Hamir Mau	264.4	2,673
Kolabarhanpur	67.8	705
Dhamdhama	73.2	2,154
Melawa Sahab	363.4	2,452
Gurgujpur	96.1	634
Alawalpur	229.3	3,211
Behi Khor	407.6	2,951
Serandajpur	44.8	53
