= Chhichhaura =

- Village
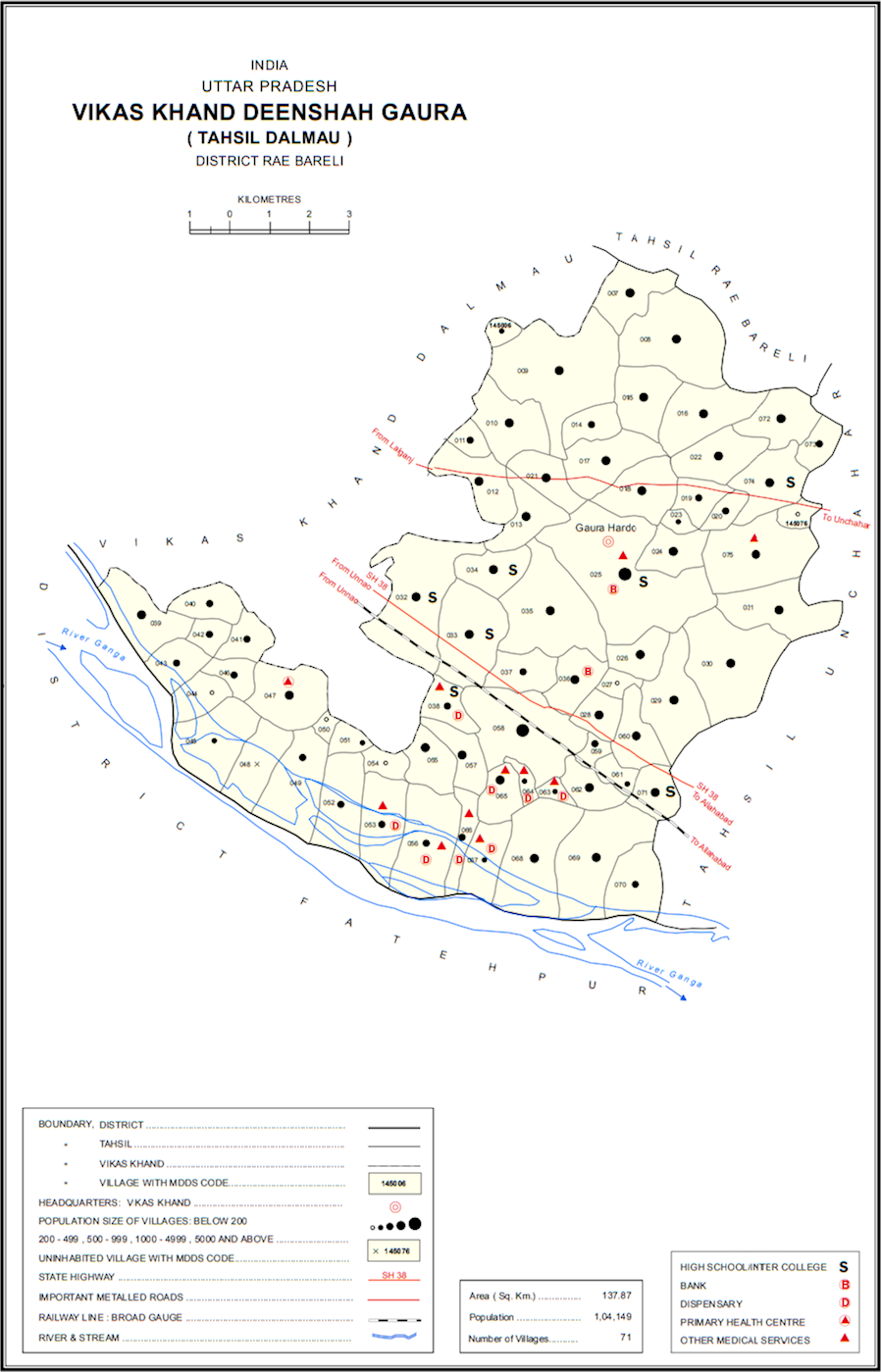
- Map showing Chhichhaura (#020) in Deenshah Gaura CD block

- Location in Uttar Pradesh, India
- Coordinates: 26.056044°N 81.199867°E
- Country India: India
- State: Uttar Pradesh
- District: Raebareli

Area
  - Total: 0.388 km^{2} (0.150 sq mi)

Population (2011)
  - Total: 862
  - Density: 2,220/km^{2} (5,750/sq mi)

Languages
  - Official: Hindi
- Time zone: UTC+5:30 (IST)
- Vehicle registration: UP-35

Chhichhaura is a village in Deenshah Gaura block of Rae Bareli district, Uttar Pradesh, India. It is located 20 km from Raebareli, the district headquarters. As of 2011, it has a population of 862 people, in 157 households. It has one primary school and no healthcare facilities.

The 1961 census recorded Chhichhaura as comprising 1 hamlet, with a total population of 287 people (141 male and 146 female), in 69 households and 65 physical houses. The area of the village was given as 102 acres.

The 1981 census recorded Chhichhaura as having a population of 407 people, in 86 households, and having an area of 38.85 hectares. The main staple foods were listed as wheat and rice.
