= Murethi =

- Village
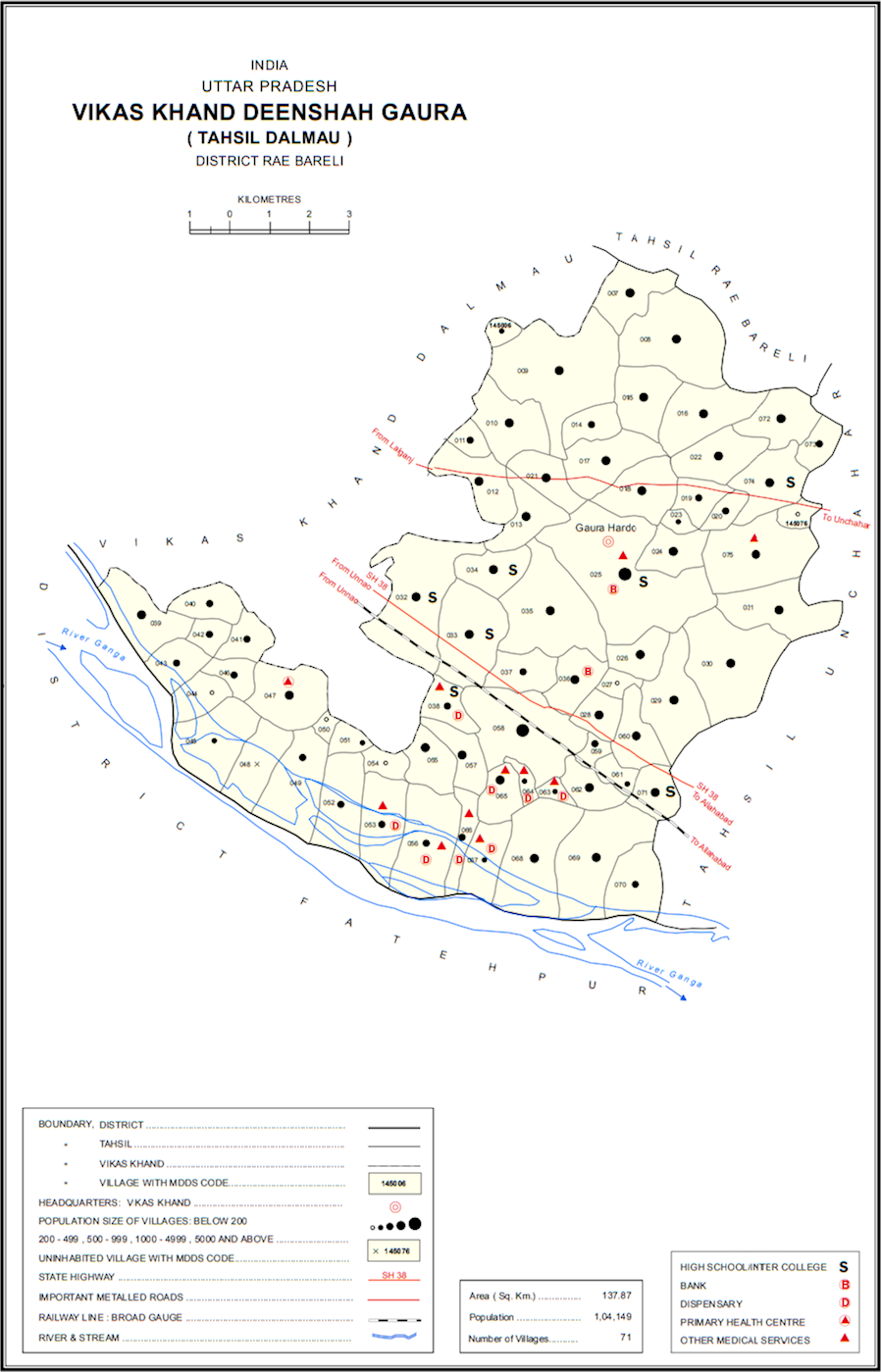
- Map showing Murethi (#026) in Deenshah Gaura CD block

- Location in Uttar Pradesh, India
- Coordinates: 26.024171°N 81.181278°E
- Country India: India
- State: Uttar Pradesh
- District: Raebareli

Area
  - Total: 1.284 km^{2} (0.496 sq mi)

Population (2011)
  - Total: 1,041
  - Density: 810.7/km^{2} (2,100/sq mi)

Languages
  - Official: Hindi
- Time zone: UTC+5:30 (IST)
- Vehicle registration: UP-35

Murethi is a village in Deenshah Gaura block of Rae Bareli district, Uttar Pradesh, India. As of 2011, it has a population of 1,041 people, in 218 households. It has one primary school and no healthcare facilities.

The 1961 census recorded Murethi (as "Muraithi") as comprising 6 hamlets, with a total population of 494 people (241 male and 253 female), in 93 households and 91 physical houses. The area of the village was given as 335 acres.

The 1981 census recorded Murethi (as "Muraithi") as having a population of 582 people, in 110 households, and having an area of 131.12 hectares. The main staple foods were listed as wheat and rice.
