= Dhamdhama =

- Village
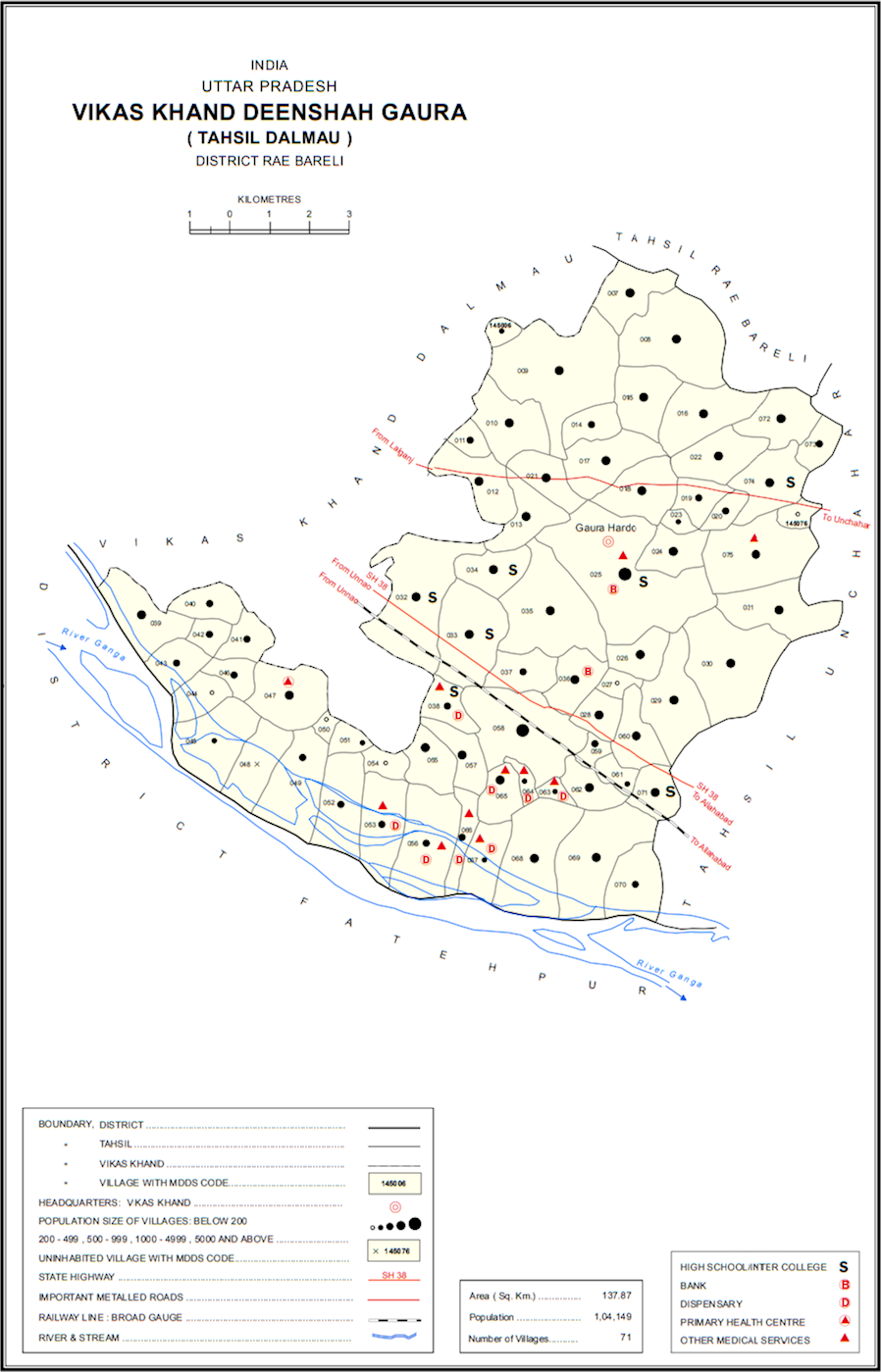
- Map showing Dhamdhama (#071) in Deenshah Gaura CD block

- Location in Uttar Pradesh, India
- Coordinates: 26.994659°N 81.183855°E
- Country India: India
- State: Uttar Pradesh
- District: Raebareli

Area
  - Total: 0.732 km^{2} (0.283 sq mi)

Population (2011)
  - Total: 2,154
  - Density: 2,940/km^{2} (7,620/sq mi)

Languages
  - Official: Hindi
- Time zone: UTC+5:30 (IST)
- Vehicle registration: UP-35

Dhamdhama is a village in Deenshah Gaura block of Rae Bareli district, Uttar Pradesh, India. As of 2011, it has a population of 2,154 people, in 343 households. It has one primary school and no healthcare facilities. Dhamdhama hosts a small market once per week on Thursdays; vegetables and cloth are the main items traded.

The 1961 census recorded Dhamdhama as comprising 2 hamlets, with a total population of 712 people (358 male and 354 female), in 141 households and 127 physical houses. The area of the village was given as 221 acres. Average attendance of the weekly market was about 70 people.

The 1981 census recorded Dhamdhama as having a population of 1,023 people, in 199 households, and having an area of 317.28 hectares. The main staple foods were listed as wheat and rice.
