= Gaura Khaspari =

- Village
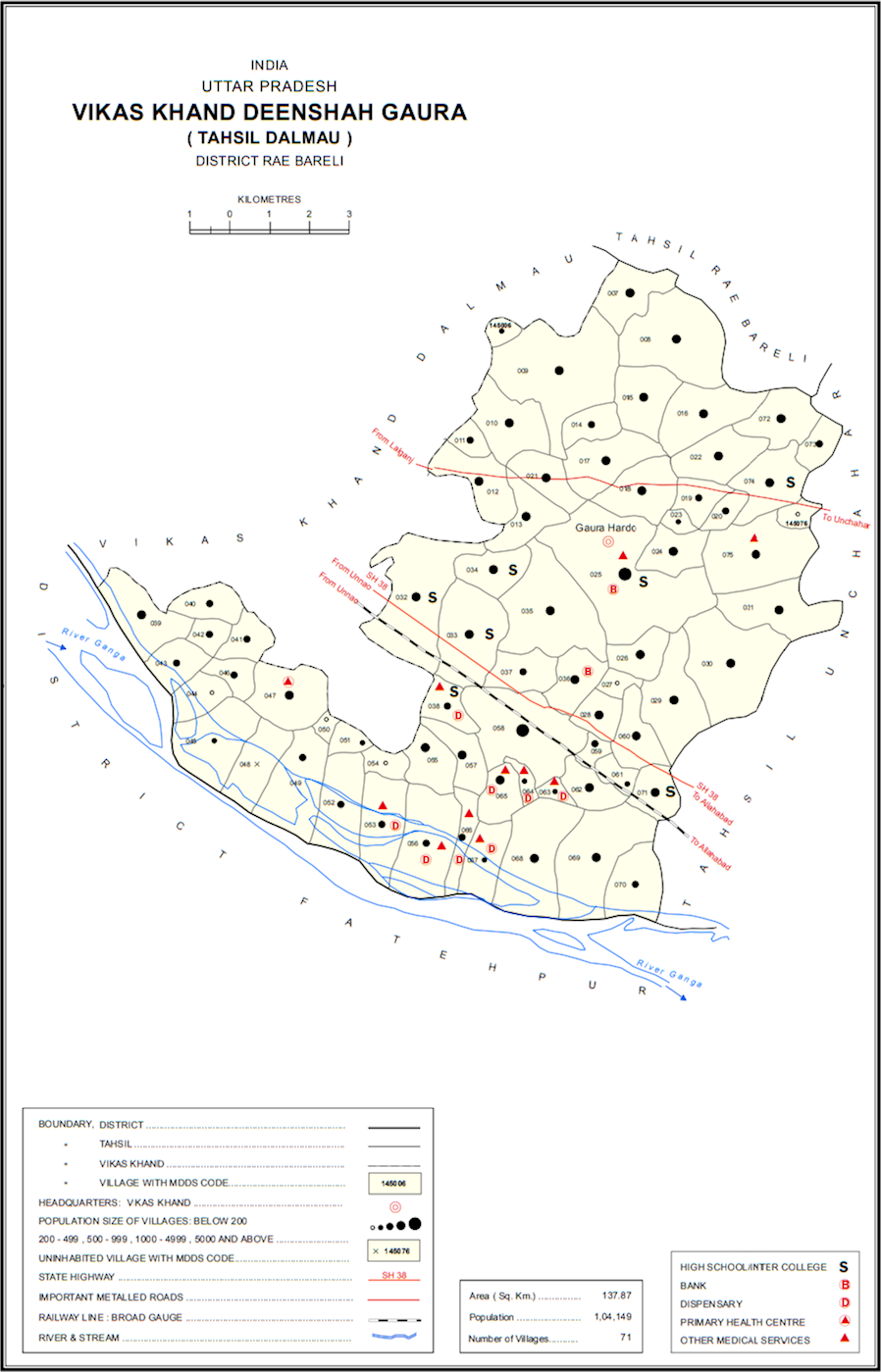
- Map showing Gaura Khaspari (#010) in Deenshah Gaura CD block

- Location in Uttar Pradesh, India
- Coordinates: 26.078114°N 81.152644°E
- Country India: India
- State: Uttar Pradesh
- District: Raebareli

Area
  - Total: 2.408 km^{2} (0.930 sq mi)

Population (2011)
  - Total: 1,963
  - Density: 815.2/km^{2} (2,111/sq mi)

Languages
  - Official: Hindi
- Time zone: UTC+5:30 (IST)
- Vehicle registration: UP-35

Gaura Khaspari is a village in Deenshah Gaura block of Rae Bareli district, Uttar Pradesh, India. It is located 31 km from Raebareli, the district headquarters. As of 2011, it has a population of 1,963 people, in 366 households. It has one primary school and no healthcare facilities.

The 1961 census recorded Gaura Khaspari as comprising 5 hamlets, with a total population of 811 people (417 male and 394 female), in 154 households and 136 physical houses. The area of the village was given as 598 acres.

The 1981 census recorded Gaura Khaspari as having a population of 1,050 people, in 191 households, and having an area of 242.00 hectares. The main staple foods were listed as wheat and rice.
