= Saelele =

- Commune
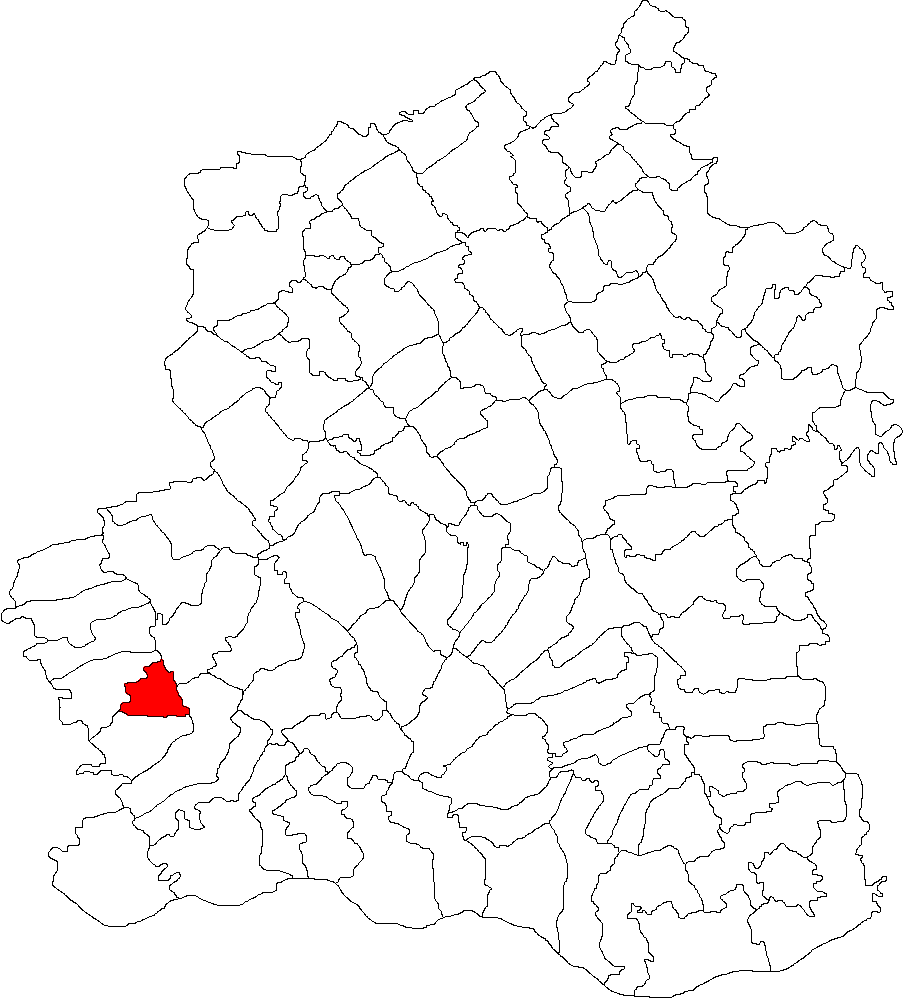
- Location in Teleorman County

- Location in Romania
- Coordinates: 43°52′N 24°43′E
- Country: Romania
- County: Teleorman
- Subdivisions: Pleașov, Saelele
- Population (2021-12-01): 1,901
- Time zone: EET/EEST (UTC+2/+3)
- Vehicle reg.: TR

Saelele is a commune in Teleorman County, Muntenia, Romania. It is composed of two villages, Pleașov and Saelele. These were part of Lunca Commune until 2004, when they were split off.
