= Sai, Raebareli =

Sai
- Village
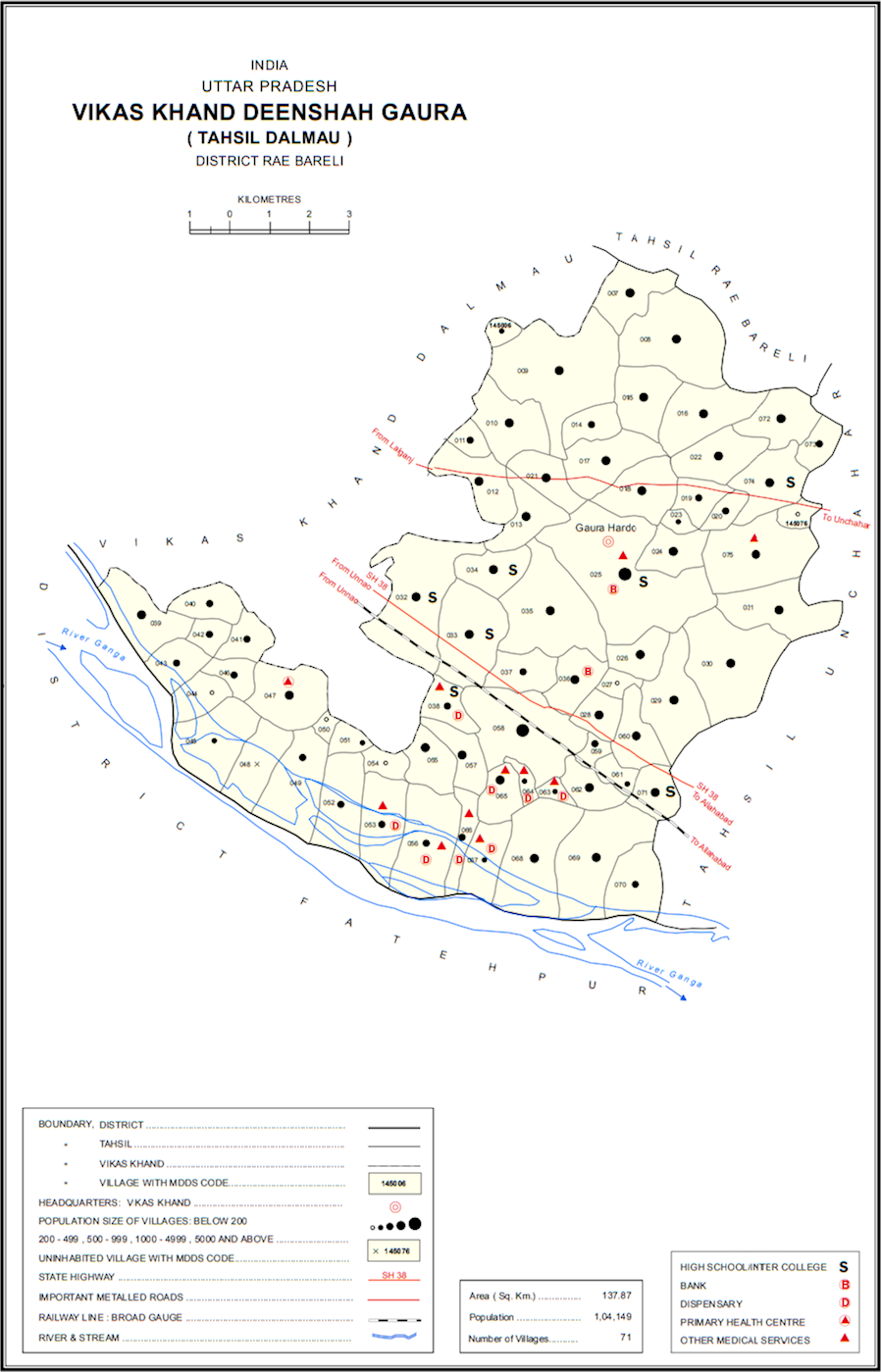
- Map showing Sai (#017) in Deenshah Gaura CD block

- Location in Uttar Pradesh, India
- Coordinates: 26.07025°N 81.174467°E
- Country India: India
- State: Uttar Pradesh
- District: Raebareli

Area
  - Total: 2.63 km^{2} (1.02 sq mi)

Population (2011)
  - Total: 1,949
  - Density: 741/km^{2} (1,920/sq mi)

Languages
  - Official: Hindi
- Time zone: UTC+5:30 (IST)
- Vehicle registration: UP-35

Sai is a village in Deenshah Gaura block of Rae Bareli district, Uttar Pradesh, India. It is located 30 km from Raebareli, the district headquarters. As of 2011, it has a population of 1,949 people, in 348 households. It has one primary school and no healthcare facilities.

The 1961 census recorded Sai as comprising 4 hamlets, with a total population of 680 people (331 male and 349 female), in 157 households and 144 physical houses. The area of the village was given as 673 acres.

The 1981 census recorded Sai as having a population of 977 people, in 210 households, and having an area of 261.83 hectares. The main staple foods were listed as wheat and rice.
