= Slobozia Mândra =

- Commune
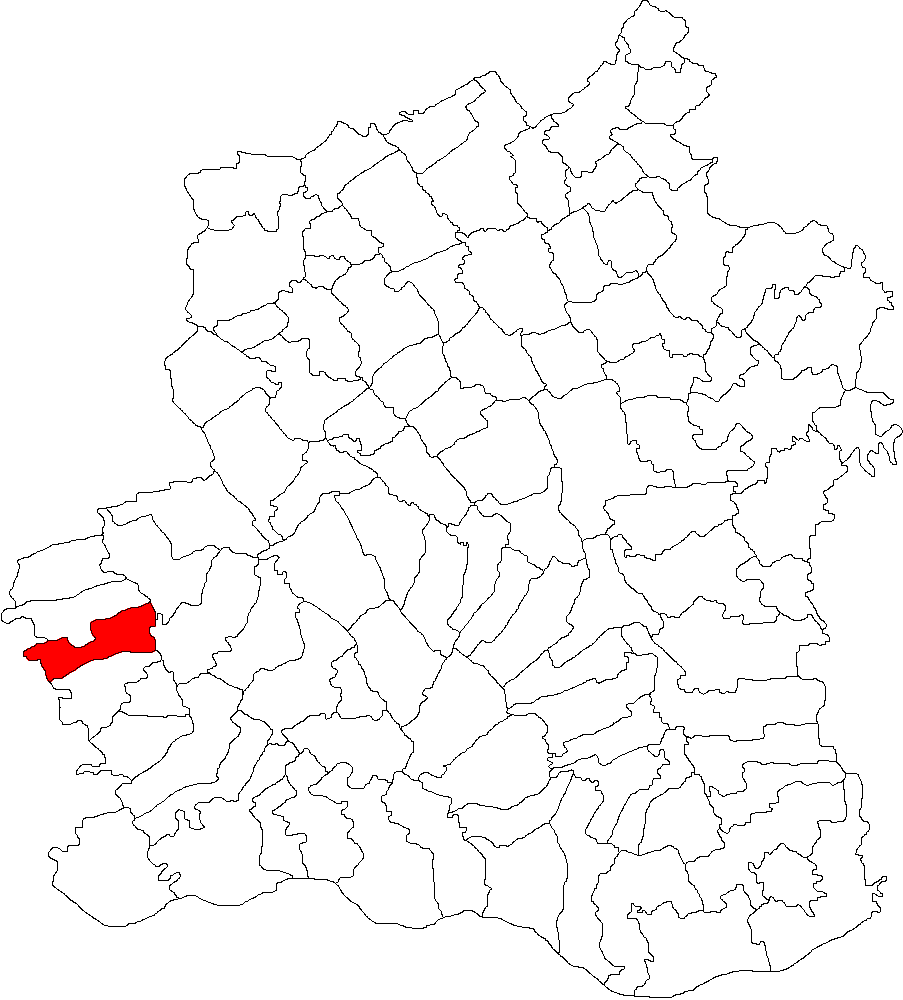
- Location in Teleorman County

- Location in Romania
- Coordinates: 43°55′N 24°42′E
- Country: Romania
- County: Teleorman

Government
  - Mayor (2020–2024): Marinel Ștefan (PSD)
- Area: 37.9 km^{2} (14.6 sq mi)
- Elevation: 68 m (223 ft)
- Population (2021-12-01): 1,358
  - Density: 36/km^{2} (93/sq mi)
- Time zone: EET/EEST (UTC+2/+3)
- Postal code: 147355
- Area code: +(40) 247
- Vehicle reg.: TR
- Website: www.slobozia-mandra.ro

Slobozia Mândra is a commune in Teleorman County, Muntenia, Romania. It is composed of a single village, Slobozia Mândra. It also included two other villages until 2004, when they were split off to form Uda-Clocociov Commune.

The commune is situated in the Wallachian Plain, a short distance from the Olt River. It is located in the western reaches of Teleorman County, on the border with Olt County, 26 km (16 mi) north of Turnu Măgurele and 70 km (43 mi) west of the county seat, Alexandria.
