= Sai (Mawal) =

Village in Maharashtra

- Village
- Country: India
- State: Maharashtra
- District: Pune
- Tehsil: Mawal

Government
  - Type: Panchayati Raj
  - Body: Gram panchayat

Area
  - Total: 412.70 ha (1,019.8 acres)

Population (2011)
  - Total: 832
  - Density: 202/km^{2} (522/sq mi)
- Sex ratio 404 / 428 ♂/♀

Languages
  - Official: Marathi
  - Other spoken: Hindi
- Time zone: UTC+5:30 (IST)
- Website: pune.nic.in

Sai is a village and gram panchayat in India, situated in the Mawal taluka of Pune district in the state of Maharashtra. It encompasses an area of 412.70 ha (1,020 acres).

== Administration ==
The village is administrated by a sarpanch, an elected representative who leads a gram panchayat. At the time of the 2011 Census of India, the village was the headquarters for the eponymous gram panchayat, which also governed the villages of Nanoli Nane Mawal and Paravadi.

== Demographics ==
At the 2011 census, the village comprised 142 households. The population of 832 was split between 404 males and 428 females.

== See also ==
- List of villages in Mawal taluka
