= Yoshiko Sai =

Japanese singer (born 1953)

Yoshiko Sai 佐井好子
- Born: 22 June 1953 (age 73); Nara Prefecture, Japan
- Genres: Psychedelic folk; Jazz; Bossa nova; Flamenco; Progressive music; Art pop
- Occupations: Singer; composer; poet
- Years active: 1975–1979; 2001–present
- Labels: Teichiku Records (1975–1977); Nippon Columbia (1977–1979); P-Vine Records (2008–present)
- Website: saiyoshiko.jp

Yoshiko Sai (佐井 好子, Sai Yoshiko; born 22 June 1953) is a Japanese singer, composer and poet.

== Musical career ==
Yoshiko Sai was born in the south of Nara Prefecture in 1953. As a child she liked to draw, and eventually also became a keen reader. Although tests left little time for this hobby during high school, she recalls that she read some works by Edogawa Ranpo. In junior high school she entered the chorus club. Then in senior high school she and four other students started a band inspired by the popular folk group "Akai Tori" (赤い鳥), but she was more interested in painting at the time (she would later be personally responsible for the artwork of most of her albums). After failing to enter the Kyoto University of the Arts in 1972 she enrolled in the law department at Doshisha University instead, but spent the following year bed-ridden by a kidney disease. During her convalescence she read many books by famous authors, but most of all bizarre and dreamlike novels by authors like Mushitarō Oguri, Tachibana Sotoo, Yumeno Kyūsaku, Juran Hisao and Seishi Yokomizo. She recalled that "... perhaps it was because of my illness, but reading dark novels made me feel calm." The books would have a large influence on her later songwriting. After being discharged she began to write poems, and came up with the idea of turning them into songs so that many people could listen to them at once.

In 1974, after submitting songs to contests such as radio programs, she was soon invited to perform as an opening act at Rabi Nakayama’s concert. Following the performance, she signed with Teichiku Records, one of the two record companies that made him an offer.

Yoshiko's first album was produced by Yuji Ohno, who would later become famous for writing the soundtrack of anime franchise Lupin III. Soon after recording her second album, Ohno wrote the movies' soundtracks.

In 1977, Sai transferred from Teichiku to Nippon Columbia and released the album Taiji no Yume (Dream of the Fetus), inspired by the world of Kyūsaku Yumeno. In the same year, she also published a poetry collection titled Aoi Garasudama (Blue Glass Beads) through Fujin Seikatsu-sha [3]. In addition, she provided the theme song for the Nikkatsu film Kyūsaku Yumeno no Shōjo Jigoku (Girl Hell by Kyūsaku Yumeno), performed by the band Cosmos Factory.

In 1978, at the request of actor Yūsaku Matsuda (internationally renowned for his role in Black Rain alongside Michael Douglas), Yoshiko provided him with the songs called "Hitoyo-zake" and "Izakaya". That same year, after traveling to India, she released her final album with Nippon Columbia, Chō no Sumu Heya (The Room Where Butterflies Live). Unlike her previous three works, this album took a new direction, featuring a jazzy sound with backing by the Tsuyoshi Yamamoto Trio, led by jazz pianist Tsuyoshi Yamamoto [1][9].

In the following year, 1979, she ceased her musical activities.

Return to the music scene

In 1998, she fulfilled her long-held dream of visiting the Silk Road, traveling to the places she most wished to see—Samarkand, Bukhara, and Khiva in Uzbekistan. Around this time, with the spread of the internet, the “Yoshiko Sai Reevaluation Committee,” which called for the release of her LPs on CD, appeared online.

On October 25, 1999, four of her past albums were reissued by SFC Music Publishing (now Ultra-Vybe) in the form of two different double-CD sets. During this CD release, she met Jojo Hiroshige, who had been commissioned to write the liner notes, and this encounter led to the resumption of her musical activities [1]. Jojo Hiroshige had been an avid listener of Yoshiko Sai’s music since his high school days in the 1970s, and was such a devoted fan that he described her as “the artist I love the most and who has had the greatest influence on me” and said, “I will continue listening until I die” [10][11]. However, it was only in September of that year, through an interview, that he met Sai directly for the first time.

In 2001, Sai held a session with Jojo Hiroshige at a studio in Osaka, where they recorded an improvised performance. This recording was released as the album Crimson Voyage on Alchemy Records, the independent label run by Jojo Hiroshige.

On December 10, 2003, her poetry collection Aoi Garasudama (Blue Glass Beads) was republished by Alchemy Records. To commemorate this, from December 11 to 23 of the same year, a solo exhibition of Sai’s artwork, titled Yoshiko Sai Retrospective, was held at FUKUGAN GALLERY (1-9-20 Nishi-Shinsaibashi, Chūō-ku, Osaka), co-sponsored by Alchemy Records. Ten of Sai’s works, including the original artwork for the jacket of the album Taiji no Yume (Dream of the Fetus), along with more than ten illustrations by Tsuyoshi Takigaito, were displayed.

In 2008, she released Taklamakan, her first original album in thirty years, on P-Vine Records. Participating musicians included Seiichi Yamamoto, Yasuhiro Yoshigaki, and Takeharu Hayakawa. Her earlier albums, which had long been difficult to obtain, were also reissued by P-Vine in paper-sleeve editions.

In 2014, Yoshiko gave her first live performance in thirty-five years at the event ”The 2nd Midnight Heavy Rock Party”. In 2015, She held the Yoshiko Sai One-Man Live at Shibuya O-Nest (part of the Shibuya O- series of live houses).

In 2021, a box set titled The Complete Yoshiko Sai, which included five of her past analog albums among other works, was released by P-Vine.

A Yoshiko Sai fan club was established, primarily in Europe, and remains active today.

In 2024, the French edition of Bankakyō was reissued on both vinyl and CD.

The number of streams of Taiji no Yume on Yoshiko Sai’s Spotify surpassed one million. Notably, the listener base is larger in Los Angeles, Santiago, and New York than in Tokyo. On YouTube, total views of her works exceeded four million.

In 2025, Sai held a solo painting exhibition at the Aoyama Billiken Gallery. That same year, P-Vine released recordings from her 1976 studio live rehearsals. Also, Seiga Book published Yoshiko Sai Poetry and Art Collection: From Darkness to Light.

== Legacy ==
British singer Liana Flores cited Yoshiko Sai’s Taiji no Yume (Dream of the Fetus) as her favorite album artwork. She has also included Sai’s music in her own Spotify playlist.

== Discography ==
=== Studio albums ===
- Mangekyou (sometimes credited as Mangekyo, 萬花鏡) (1975)
- Mikkō (密航) (1976)
- Taiji no Yume (胎児の夢) (1977)
- A Room with a Butterfly (蝶のすむ部屋) (1978)
- Taklamakan (タクラマカン) (2008)
- Yoshiko Sai Live 1976/79 (佐井好子 -ライブ) (2008)

=== Singles ===
- When Turning 20 Years Old (二十才になれば) (1975)
- Uninhabited Island (人のいない島) (1976)
- Spring Dream (春の夢) (1977)
- Blue Glass Ball (青いガラス玉) (2015)

=== Collaboration albums ===
- Crimson Voyage (2001) (with Jojo Hiroshige)

=== Poems ===
- Blue Glass Ball (1977)
