= Beciu =

- Commune
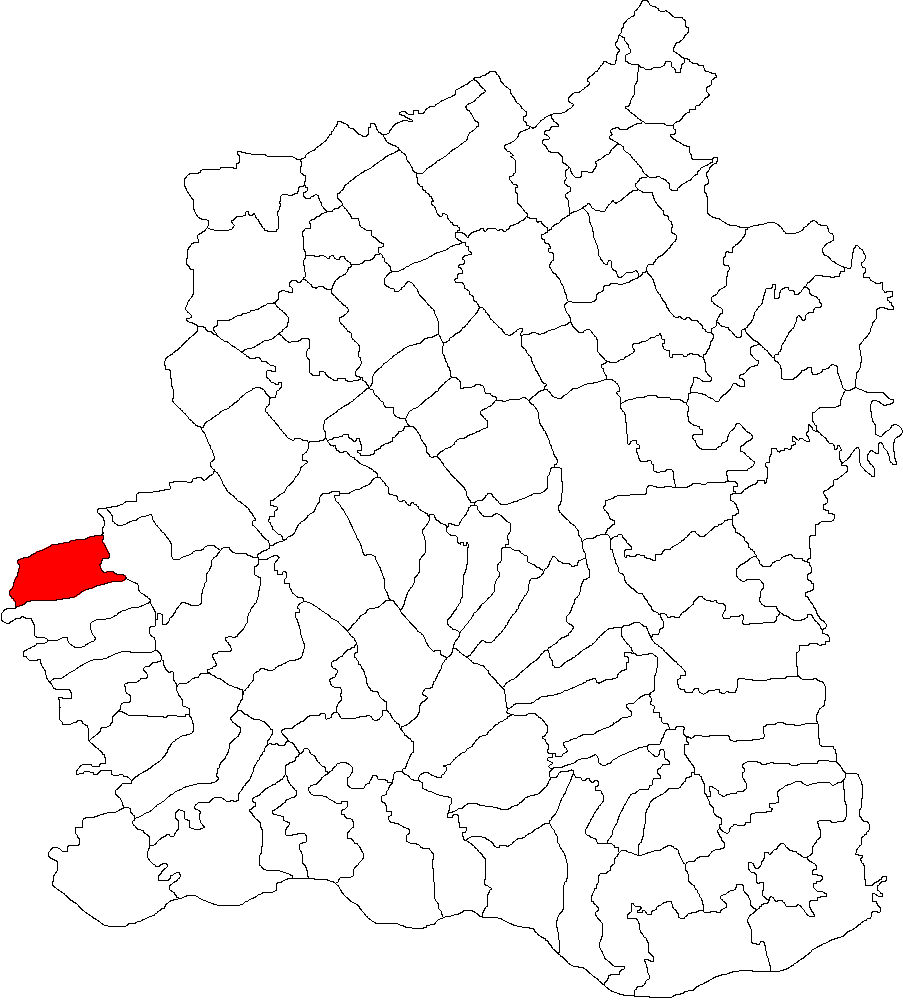
- Location in Teleorman County

- Location in Romania
- Coordinates: 44°01′N 24°40′E
- Country: Romania
- County: Teleorman
- Subdivisions: Bârseștii de Jos, Beciu, Smârdan

Government
  - Mayor (2020–2024): Gheorghe Andrei (PSD)
- Area: 25.08 km^{2} (9.68 sq mi)
- Elevation: 92 m (302 ft)
- Population (2021-12-01): 1,445
  - Density: 58/km^{2} (150/sq mi)
- Time zone: EET/EEST (UTC+2/+3)
- Postal code: 147257
- Area code: +40 247
- Vehicle reg.: TR
- Website: primariabeciu.ro

Beciu (Romanian pronunciation: [ˈbetʃju]) is a commune in Teleorman County, Muntenia, Romania. It is composed of three villages: Bârseștii de Jos, Beciu, and Smârdan. These were part of Plopii-Slăvitești Commune until 2004, when they were split off.

The commune is situated on the Wallachian Plain, at an altitude of 92 m (302 ft), on the left bank of the Olt River. It is located in the western part of Teleorman County, 69 km (43 mi) from the county seat, Alexandria, on the border with Olt County.
