= Plopii-Slăvitești =

- Commune
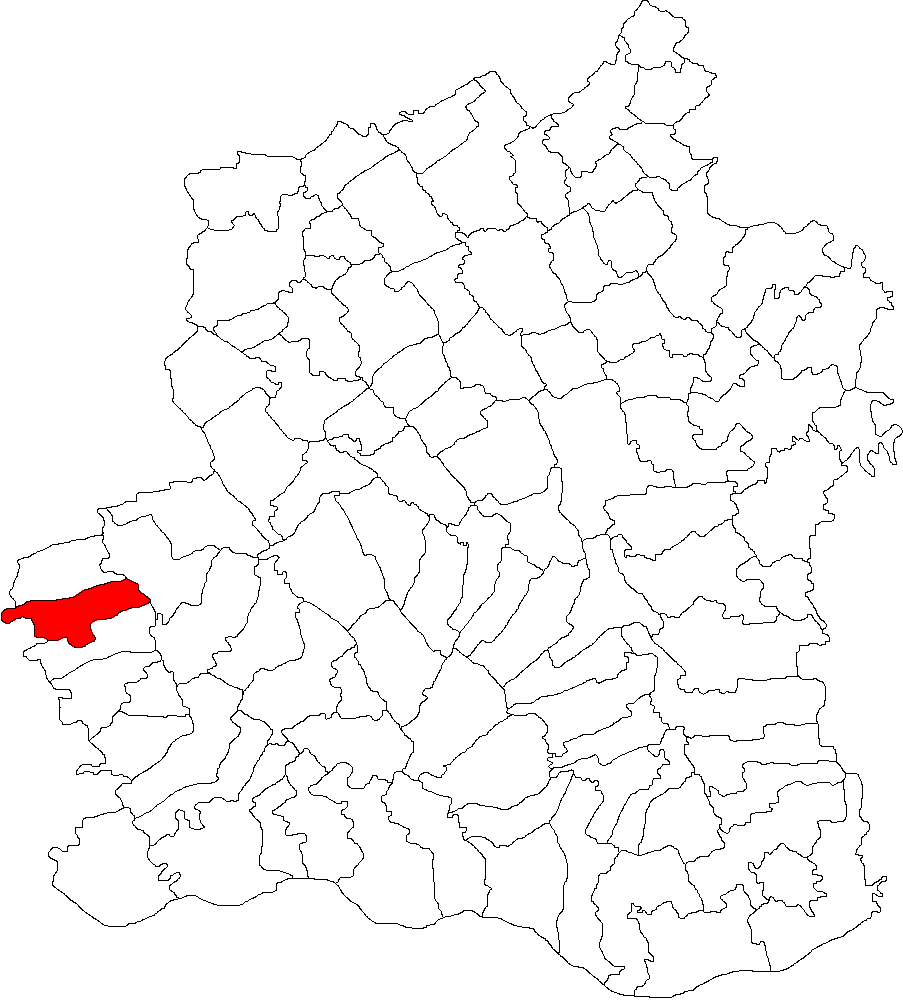
- Location in Teleorman County

- Location in Romania
- Coordinates: 43°58′N 24°41′E
- Country: Romania
- County: Teleorman
- Subdivisions: Brâncoveanca, Dudu, Plopii-Slăvitești
- Population (2021-12-01): 2,080
- Time zone: EET/EEST (UTC+2/+3)
- Vehicle reg.: TR

Plopii-Slăvitești is a commune in Teleorman County, Muntenia, Romania. It is composed of three villages: Brâncoveanca, Dudu and Plopii-Slăvitești. It included three other villages until 2004, when they were split off to form Beciu Commune.
