= Uda-Clocociov =

- Commune
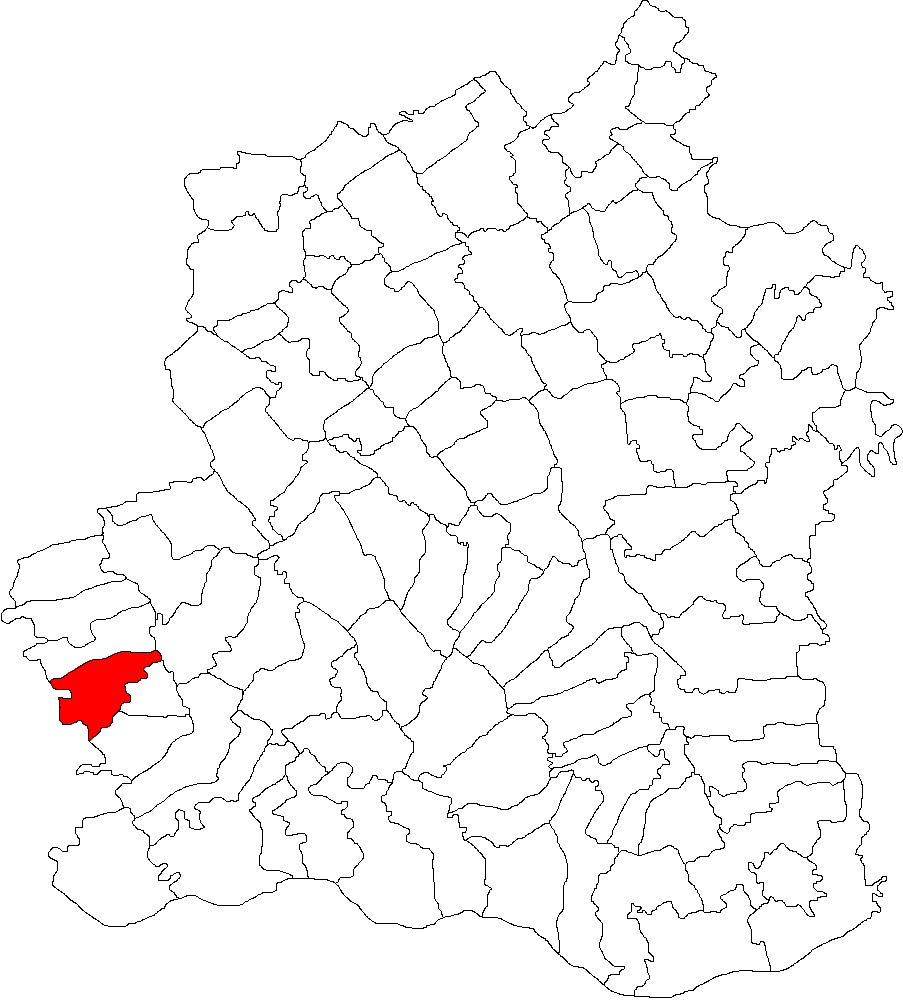
- Location in Teleorman County

- Location in Romania
- Coordinates: 43°53′15″N 24°42′50″E
- Country: Romania
- County: Teleorman
- Subdivisions: Uda-Clocociov, Uda-Paciurea

Government
  - Mayor (2020–2024): Florica Aurelia Bărbulescu (PSD)
- Area: 39.47 km^{2} (15.24 sq mi)
- Elevation: 56 m (184 ft)
- Population (2021-12-01): 1,108
  - Density: 28/km^{2} (73/sq mi)
- Time zone: EET/EEST (UTC+2/+3)
- Postal code: 147356
- Area code: +(40) 247
- Vehicle reg.: TR
- Website: primariaudaclocociov.ro

Uda-Clocociov is a commune in Teleorman County, Muntenia, Romania. It is composed of two villages, Uda-Clocociov and Uda-Paciurea. These were part of Slobozia Mândra Commune until 2004, when they were split off.
