= Lunca, Teleorman =

Lunca
- Commune
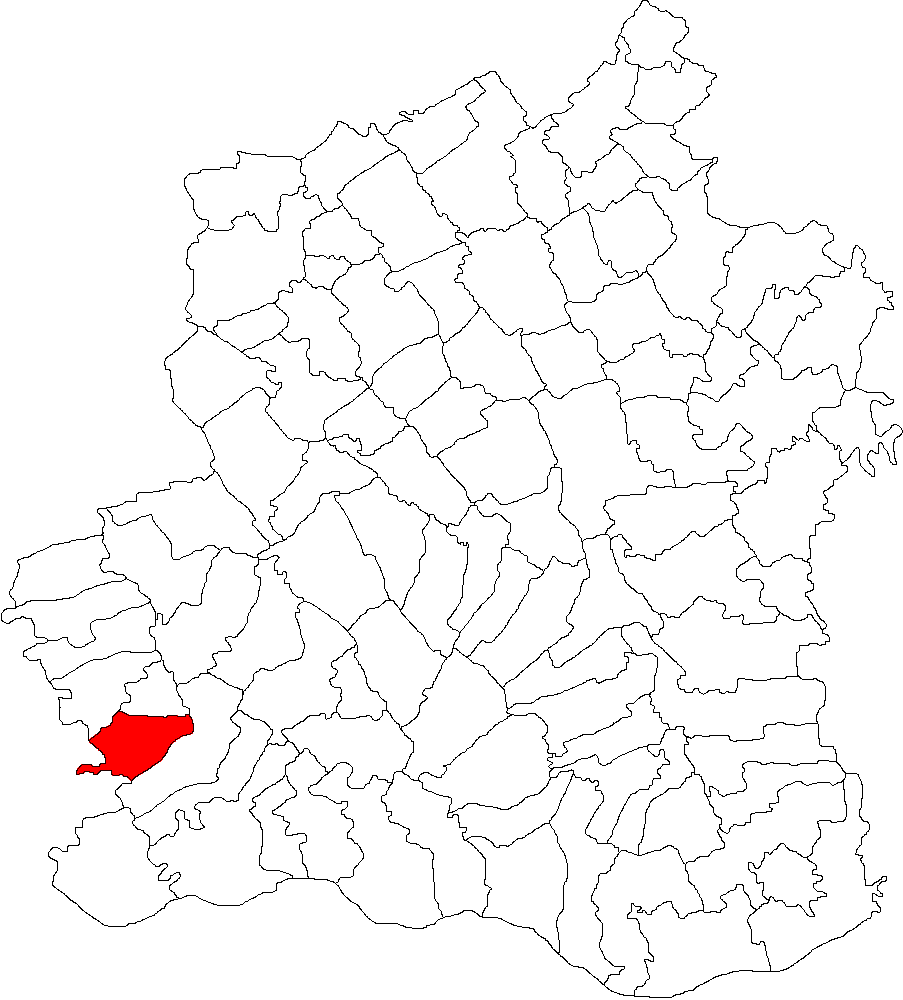
- Location in Teleorman County

- Location in Romania
- Coordinates: 43°51′N 24°46′E
- Country: Romania
- County: Teleorman
- Subdivisions: Lunca, Prundu

Government
  - Mayor (2020–2024): Valeriu-Florin Purcea (PNL)
- Population (2021-12-01): 3,145
- Time zone: EET/EEST (UTC+2/+3)
- Vehicle reg.: TR

Lunca (Romanian pronunciation: [ˈlunka]) is a commune in Teleorman County, Muntenia, Romania. It is composed of two villages, Lunca and Prundu. It included two other villages until 2004, when they were split off to form Saelele Commune.
