= Mukōjima-Hyakkaen Garden =

Flower garden in Sumida, Tokyo, Japan

- 向島百花園
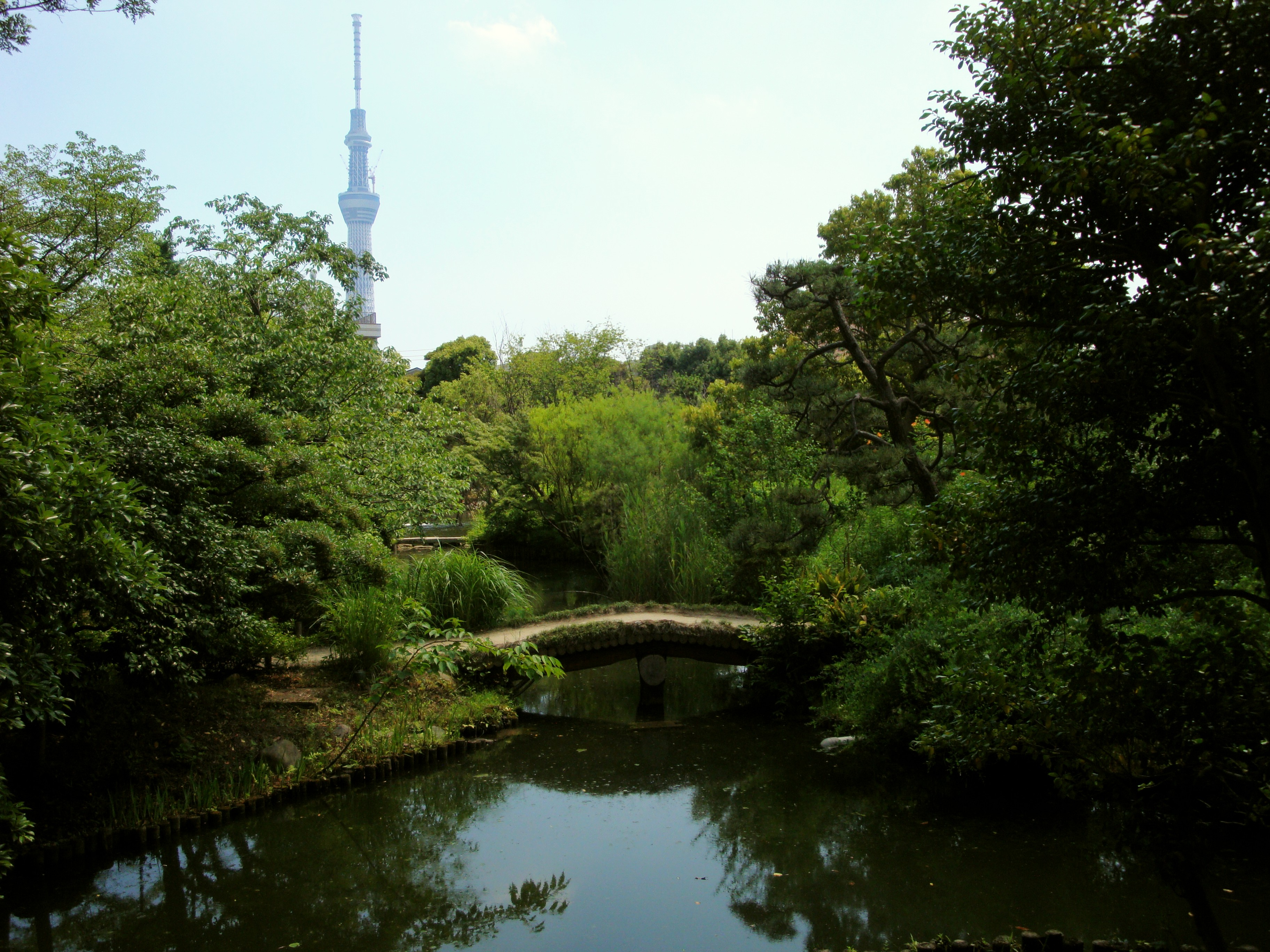
- Mukōjima-Hyakkaen Garden with Tokyo Skytree in the background

- Location within Tokyo Location within Japan
- Type: Japanese garden
- Location: Sumida, Tokyo, Japan
- Coordinates: 35°43′27″N 139°48′56″E
- Area: 8,718.52 square metres (2.15439 acres)
- Created: 1804
- National Palace of Scenic Beauty National Historic Site

Mukōjima-Hyakkaen Garden (向島百花園, Mukōjima Hyakkaen) is an urban garden located in Sumida, Tokyo. The garden was created by a merchant, and is different from daimyō gardens, and therefore it is not a "traditional Japanese garden" in the proper sense of the term. It is the only surviving flower garden from the Edo period. Mukōjima comes from the region's old name, Hyakkaen was chosen to mean "a garden with a hundred flowers that bloom throughout the four seasons". The garden covers an area of about 10,886 m^{2}.

== History ==
In 1804, Sahara Kikū, a native of Sendai Domain and a wealthy dealer in antiques purchased land near the Sumida River called the "Taga Yashiki" and planted 360 ume trees given by his friends such as Ōta Nanpo and Shibutsu Ōkubo in emulation of the famous "umeyashi" plum gardens at Kameido.The garden was initially called the "Shin-Umeyashiki" or the "Hanayashiki", and was named the "Hyakkaen" in 1806. Sahara established a literary salon, inviting poets and painters to his garden, which evolved between 1804 through 1830 to include collections of flora found in the ancient Japanese poetry such as the Man'yōshū and in the Chinese Shi Jing to provide inspiration. The gardens also included ponds, pathways and various rustic buildings. This was a reflection of the emergence of the bourgeoisie in Edo as a strong social class, and its attempt to improve its social standing by the patronage and cultivation of various bunjin — writers and artists with literary tastes. Over thirty stone monuments were erected in various locations around the gardens, inscribed with poems produced by members of this literary cortiere.

However, with the rapid industrialization of the area following the Meiji restoration and the growing pollution of the water supply to the garden, it gradually fell into disrepair. The garden suffered extensive damage when it was inundated during the Great Sumida River Flood of 1910. In 1938, in order to preserve the garden for posterity, the owner donated it to Tokyo City and it was officially opened to the general public as an admission-charged garden in 1939. The garden burned down in the Great Tokyo Air Raid in 1945 and was considered a total loss. Plans were considered to convert the site into a baseball stadium. However, the garden was restored in 1949. In 1978, it was designated as a National Place of Scenic Beauty and also a National Historic Site under the terms of the Cultural Assets Preservation Law.

The garden is an 8-minute walk from Higashi-Mukōjima Station on Tobu Isesaki Line, or a 13-minutes walk from Keisei Hikifune Station on Keisei Line.

== Gallery ==
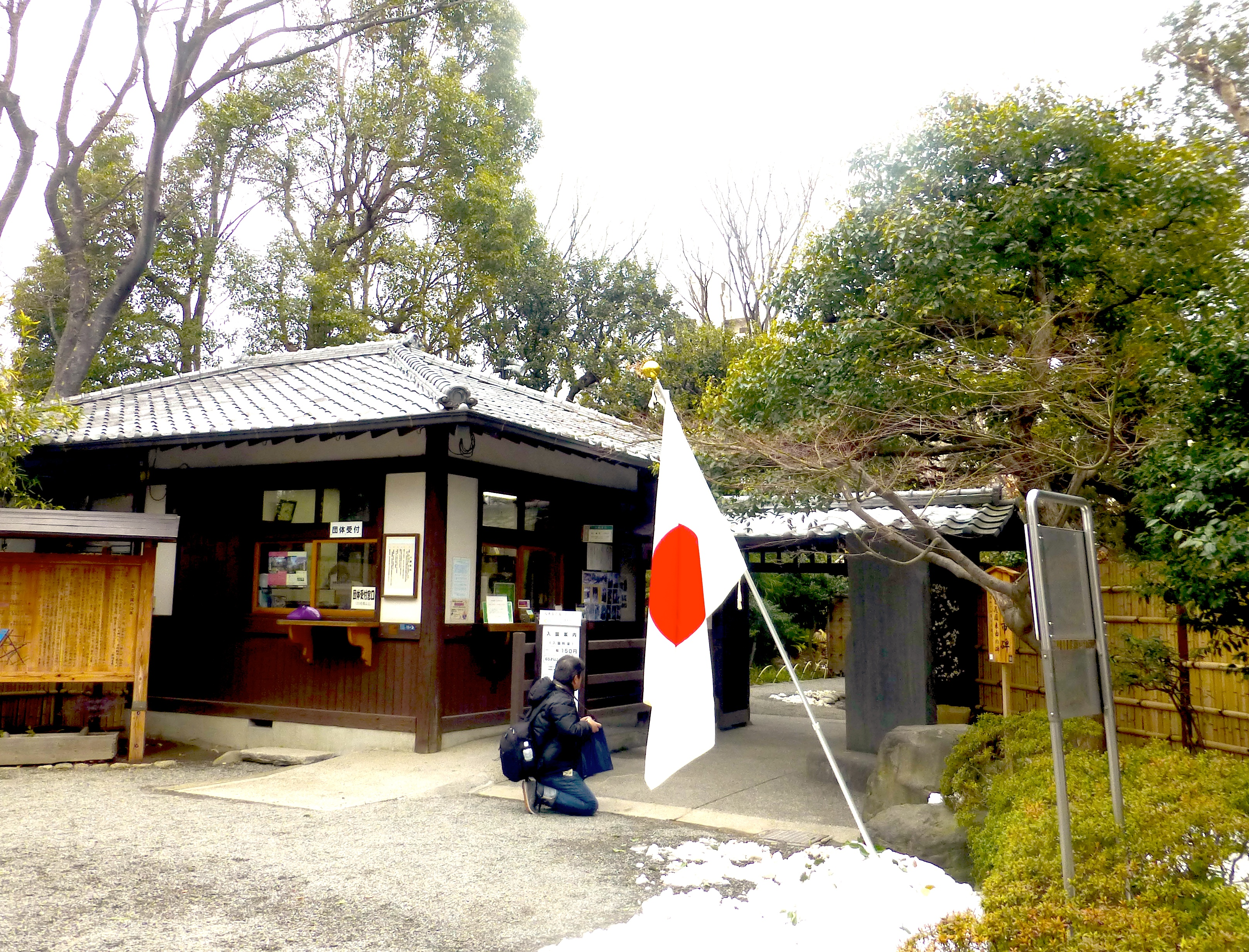
Entrance

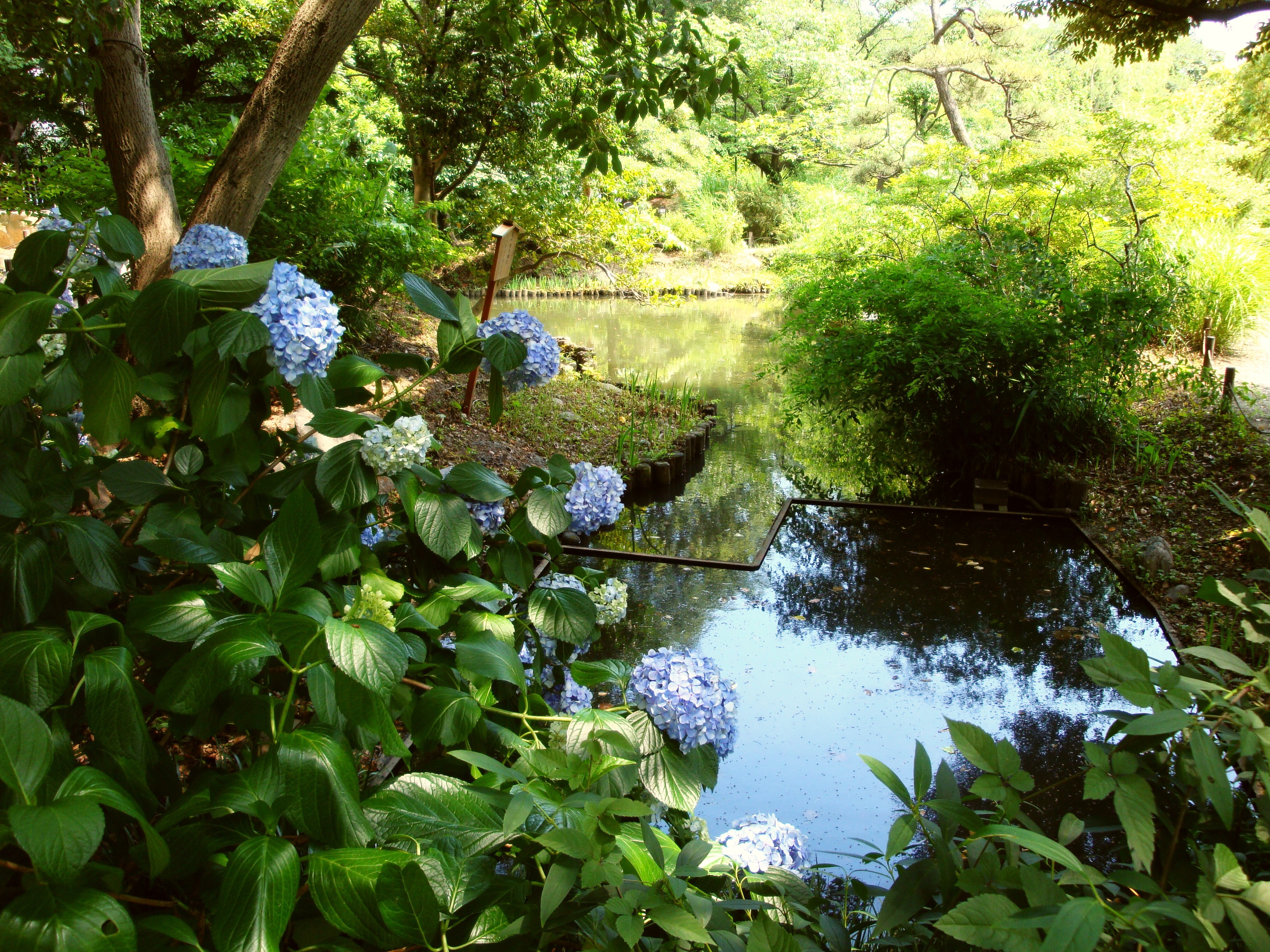
Pond

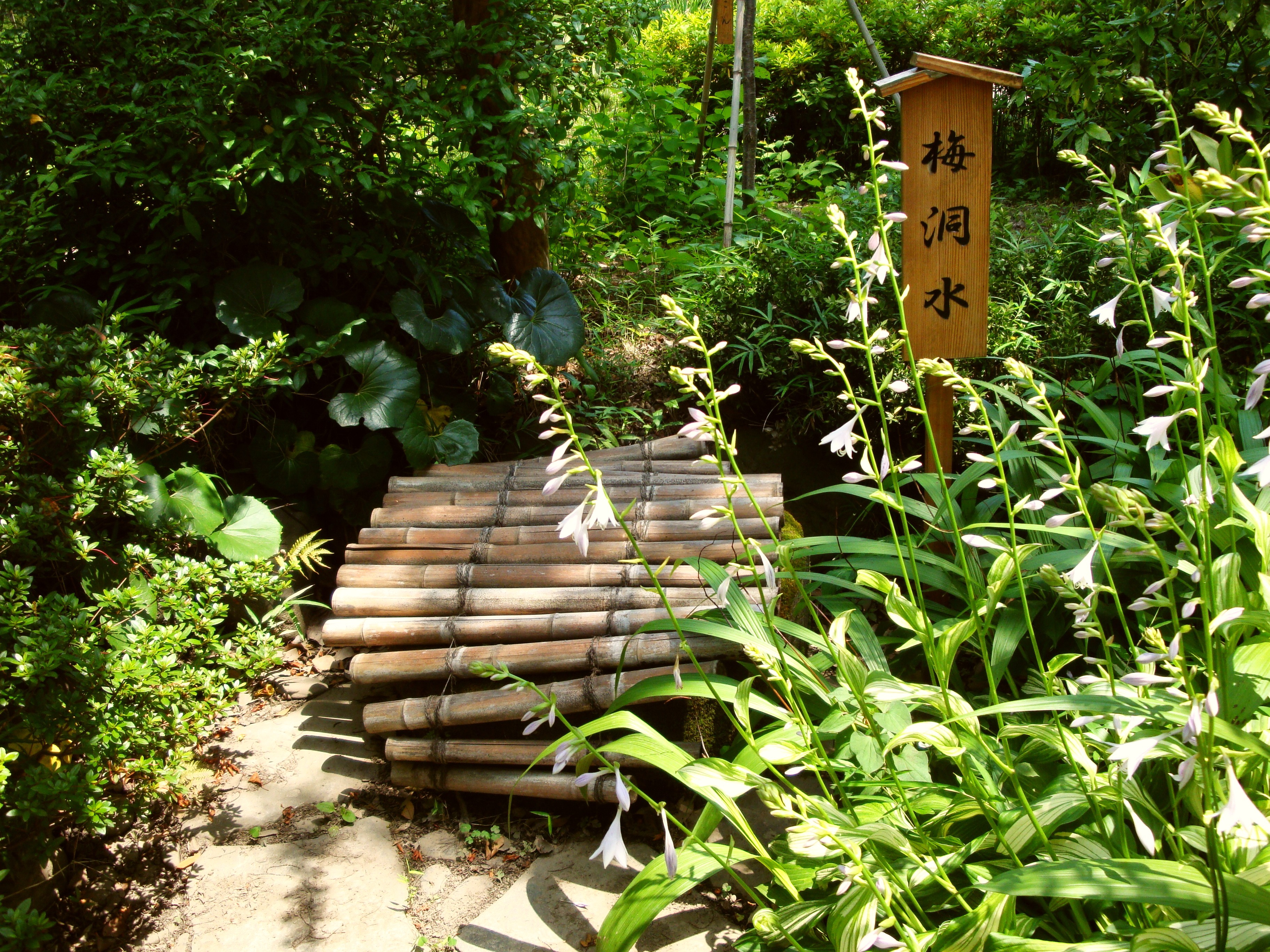
Well

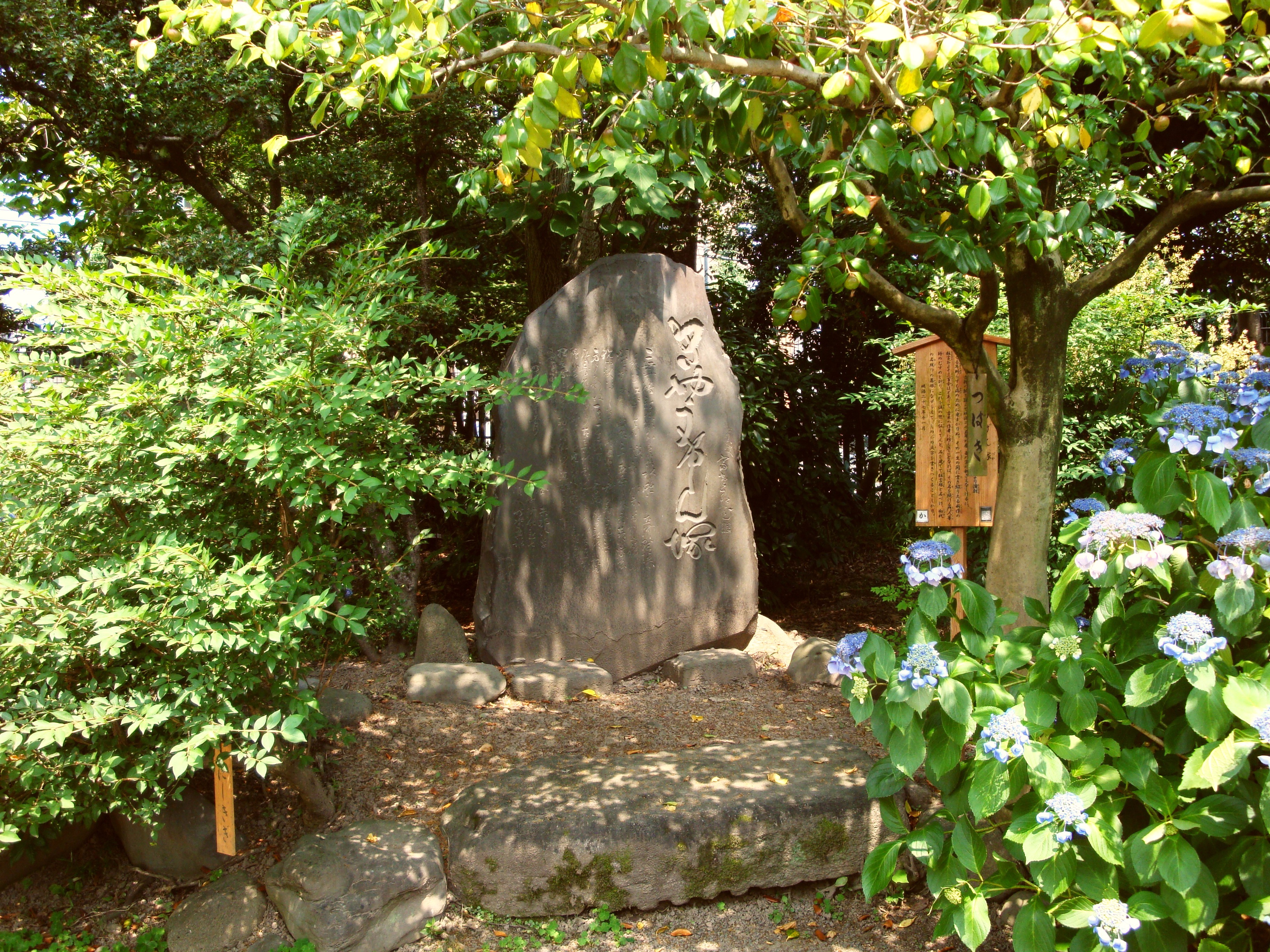
Japanese calligraphy

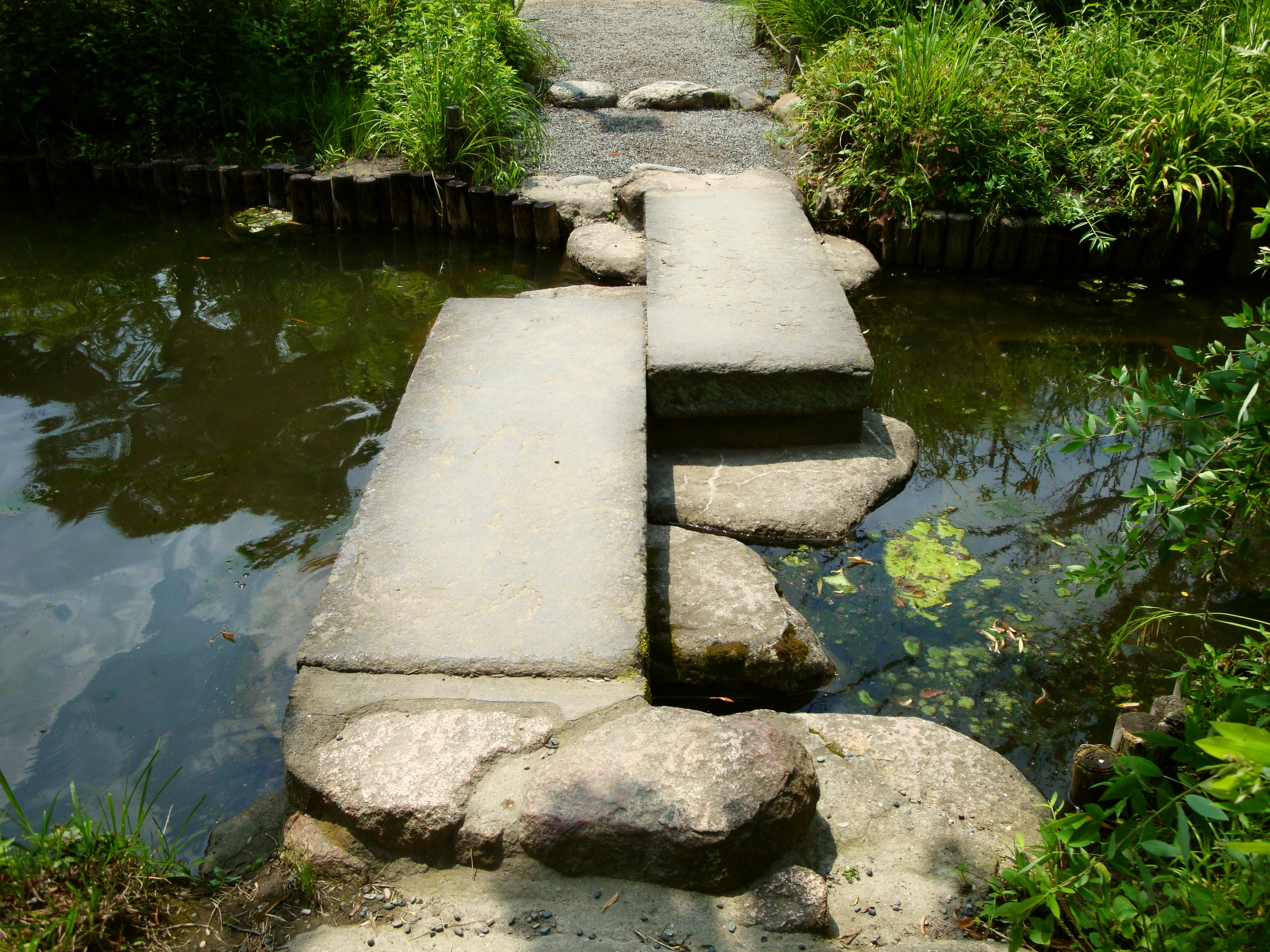
Zig-zag bridge

== See also ==
- List of Places of Scenic Beauty of Japan (Tōkyō)
- List of Historic Sites of Japan (Tōkyō)
